= Rebecca Jane =

British politician

Deputy Leader of the UK Independence Party
- In office 17 October 2022 – 20 January 2024
- Leader: Neil Hamilton
- Preceded by: Pat Mountain
- Succeeded by: Nick Tenconi

Personal details
- Born: Rebecca Jane Sutton; 1984 or 1985 (age 40–41) Barrowford, Lancashire, England
- Party: UK Independence Party (UKIP)
- Spouses: James (m. 2005, divorced); Ben Dowlers (div. 2015)
- Children: 2

Rebecca Jane Sutton (née Sutton-Gregory; born 1984 or 1985) is a British media personality, businesswoman and former politician who was deputy leader of the UK Independence Party (UKIP) from October 2022 to January 2024.

== Life and career ==
=== Early life and The Real Lady Detective Agency ===
Rebecca Jane Sutton was born in Barrowford, Lancashire, England. She once worked as a Marilyn Monroe lookalike, and managed a property company, which went bankrupt in 2009 during the Great Recession. She later established The Lady Detective Agency, a private investigation company. She stopped working with front-line investigation to work in marketing because her husband's bosses found it compromising to his career. In 2018 she sold her detective agency.

In January 2013, HarperCollins published her book, The Real Lady Detective Agency, about her experiences.

=== Later media appearances and political career ===
On 30 September 2012, Jane appeared on the BBC's Dragon's Den. In 2017, she was a housemate on the eighteenth series of Big Brother; entering the house alongside her agency employee Kieran Lee, however competing separately. She lasted eighteen days in the house before becoming the third housemate to be evicted. At the time of her Big Brother appearances, she was studying for a master's degree in law at the University of Central Lancashire. Jane launched the 'Killing Catfish' campaign on ITV1's Loose Women in April 2017, as a result of her investigative work for Matt Peacock, a victim of catfishing.

Between February 2021 and October 2022, Jane wrote for the Burnley Express; she left after being appointed deputy leader of the UK Independence Party (UKIP), and used her final column to note that she had joined "around 2.5 years ago" after her "former boss wanted to stand as an MP", and after she researched parties for him and found that UKIP's views reflected her own. In June 2023, it was announced that she would be standing as a candidate in the 2023 Uxbridge and South Ruislip by-election, following the resignation of Boris Johnson. An article about UKIP published that month in The New European described Jane as a "far more proactive presence in the leadership" than its leader Neil Hamilton, that she "juggle[d] mental health work with GB News appearances", and that her "focus ha[d] been on attempts to unite the parties to the right of the Conservatives, which she refers to as "centre-right" or "splinter parties". She came 14th of 17th, receiving 61 votes (0.2%).

On 20 January 2024, Jane resigned from the position of Deputy Leader of UKIP; she was not replaced until the retirement of party leader Neil Hamilton, with both replaced by Lois Perry and Nick Tenconi.

== Personal life ==
Jane married James in 2005, with whom she had a daughter, Paris, in 2006.

Jane's second husband was the police officer Ben Dowlers. They have a daughter named Peach. They divorced in 2015.

Jane wrote in The Real Lady Detective Agency that she had "no sense of smell". When she was a baby, she pushed part of a pen up her nose and damaged her nerve endings.

In June 2021, former footballer Michael Owen was exposed for sexting and soliciting nude photographs from Jane, as well as arranging to meet with her at a horse-racing event despite his marital status.

She wrote in a July 2022 Burnley Express article that she had suffered from five years of post-natal depression following Paris's birth, and that she almost died during the birth of Peach and suffered from PTSD as a result; she mentioned in another article the following month that she suffered from a further bout of suicidal ideation in June 2021, following the ending of a relationship and her consequent forced departure from her job, the coverage in Sunday newspapers of her private life, and the abuse she suffered from as a result.
