= UK Independence Party =

- Abbreviation: UKIP
- General Secretary: Donald Mackay
- Leader: Nick Tenconi
- Honorary President: Neil Hamilton
- Chairman: Ben Walker
- Treasurer: Ian Garbutt
- Founder: Alan Sked
- Founded: 3 September 1993; 33 years ago
- Preceded by: Anti-Federalist League
- Headquarters: Henleaze Business Centre, 13 Harbury Road, Henleaze, Bristol, BS9 4PN
- Youth wing: Young Independence
- Membership (2020): 3,888
- Ideology: British nationalism; Christian nationalism; Islamophobia; Anti-immigration; Economic liberalism; Hard Euroscepticism; National conservatism; Right-wing populism
- Political position: Far-right Historical: Right-wing to far-right
- Religion: Christianity
- National affiliation: Patriots Alliance – English Democrats and UKIP
- European affiliation: ADDE (2014–2017)
- European Parliament group: EDD (1999–2004); IND/DEM (2004–2009); EFD (2009–2014); EFDD (2014–2018); ENF (2019)
- Colours: Purple; Gold
- Slogan: People not politics, "The New Right"
- Councillors: 0 / 18,645

Website
- ukip.org

The UK Independence Party (UKIP /ˈjuːkɪp/ YOO-kip) is a far-right Christian nationalist political party in the United Kingdom. Originally gaining prominence as a Eurosceptic right-wing populist party, it reached its peak in the mid-2010s under the leadership of Nigel Farage, when it gained two members of Parliament (both through defections) and was the largest party representing the UK in the European Parliament. Farage resigned as leader following the UK's vote for Brexit in 2016. It has since become a fringe far-right party. In February 2025 Nick Tenconi, the COO of Turning Point UK, became leader, who has pivoted the party toward Christian nationalism.

UKIP was one of the first parties formed with the specific aim of advancing the cause of the UK's withdrawal from the European Union (EU). It originated as the Anti-Federalist League, a single-issue Eurosceptic party established in London by Alan Sked in 1991. It was renamed as the UK Independence Party in 1993. Its growth was slow and it was largely eclipsed by the Eurosceptic Referendum Party, founded by James Goldsmith in 1994, until that party's 1997 dissolution. In the same year, Sked was ousted by a faction led by Farage, who became the party's preeminent figure. In 2006, Farage became leader and, under his direction the party adopted a wider policy platform and capitalised on concerns about rising immigration, in particular among the white British working class. This resulted in significant breakthroughs at the 2013 local elections, 2014 European parliamentary elections, and 2015 general election. After the UK voted to leave the EU in the 2016 EU referendum, Farage stepped down as UKIP leader, later joining the Brexit Party (now known as Reform UK), which is widely considered to be UKIP's successor. UKIP subsequently saw its vote share and membership heavily decline, losing all its elected representatives amid much internal instability and a drift toward a far-right, anti-Islam stance.

UKIP was previously characterised by political scientists as a right-wing populist party. It promotes a British unionist and British nationalist agenda, encouraging a unitary British identity in opposition to growing Welsh, Irish and Scottish nationalisms. UKIP has also placed emphasis on lowering immigration, rejecting multiculturalism, and opposing what it calls the "Islamification" of Britain. Influenced by Thatcherism and classical liberalism, it describes itself as economically libertarian and promotes liberal economic policies. It is socially conservative on LGBT rights, education policy, and criminal justice. Having an ideological heritage stemming from the right wing of the Conservative Party, Farage distinguished it from the political establishment through heavy use of populist rhetoric, describing its supporters as the "People's Army".

Governed by its leader and national executive committee, UKIP is divided into 12 regional groups. While gaining electoral support from various sectors of British society, psephologists established that at its height, UKIP's primary voting base consisted of older, working-class white men living in England. UKIP has faced a critical reception from mainstream political parties, much of the media, and anti-fascist groups. Its discourse on immigration and cultural identity generated accusations of racism and xenophobia, both of which it denies.

== History ==
=== Foundation and early years: 1991–2004 ===
The initial UKIP logo

UKIP began as the Anti-Federalist League, a Eurosceptic political party established in 1991 by the historian Alan Sked. The League opposed the Maastricht Treaty, which was signed by UK Prime Minister John Major in 1992 and created the European Union (EU), and sought to sway the governing Conservative Party towards removing the United Kingdom from the EU. A former Liberal Party candidate, member of the Bruges Group, and professor at the London School of Economics (LSE), Sked had converted to Euroscepticism while teaching the LSE's European Studies programme. Under the Anti-Federalist League's banner, Sked was a candidate for Member of Parliament (MP) for Bath at the 1992 general election, gaining 0.2% of the vote. At a party meeting held in the LSE on 3 September 1993, the group was renamed the UK Independence Party, deliberately avoiding the term "British" so as to avoid confusion with the far-right British National Party (BNP).

UKIP contested the 1994 European Parliament election with little financing and much infighting, securing itself as the fifth-largest party in that election with 1% of the vote. During this period, UKIP was viewed as a typical single-issue party by commentators, some of whom drew comparisons with the French Poujadist movement. Following the election, UKIP lost much support to the Referendum Party; founded by the multi-millionaire James Goldsmith in 1994, it shared UKIP's Eurosceptic approach but was far better funded. In the 1997 general election, UKIP fielded 194 candidates and secured 0.3% of the national vote; only one of its candidates, Nigel Farage in Salisbury, secured over 5% of the vote and had his deposit returned. UKIP was beaten by the Referendum Party in 163 of the 165 seats in which they stood against each other. The Referendum Party disbanded following Goldsmith's death later that year, and many of its candidates joined UKIP.

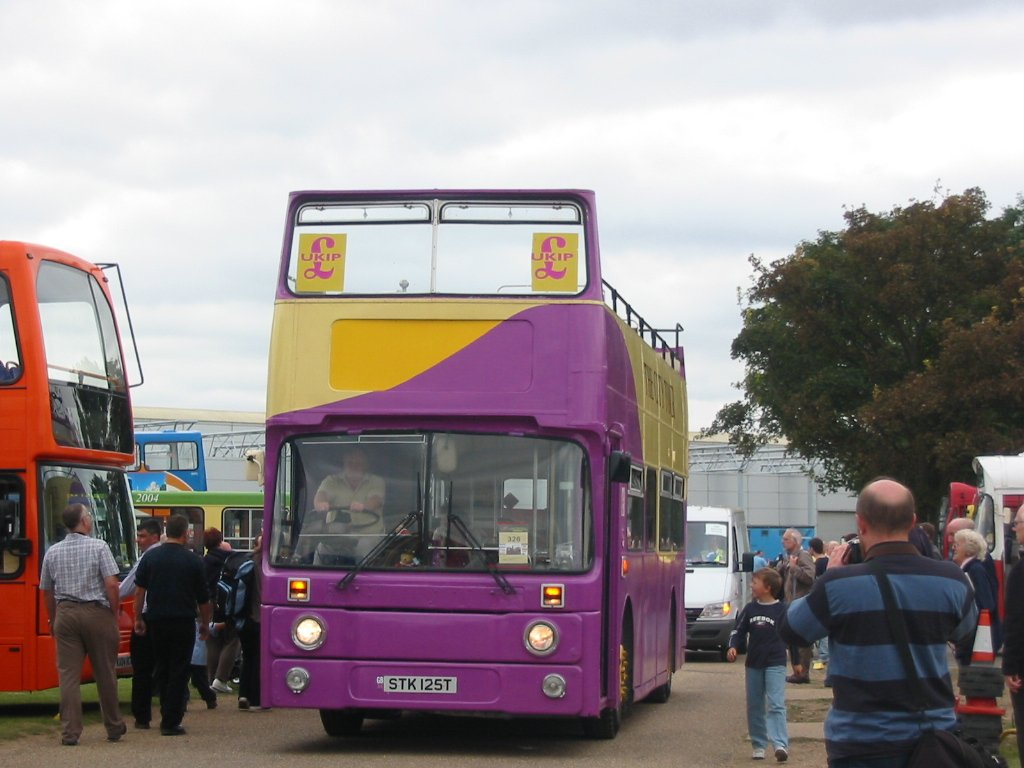
A UKIP campaign bus, 2004

After the election, Sked was pressured into resigning by a party faction led by Farage, David Lott and Michael Holmes, who deemed him too intellectual and dictatorial. Sked left the party, alleging that it had been infiltrated by racist and far-right elements, including BNP spies. This connection was emphasised in the press, particularly when Farage was photographed meeting with BNP activists. Holmes took over as party leader, and in the 1999 European Parliament elections—the first British election for the European Parliament to use proportional representation—UKIP received 6.5% of the vote and three seats, in South East England (Farage), South West England (Holmes), and the East of England (Jeffrey Titford).

An internal power struggle ensued between Holmes and the party's national executive committee (NEC), which was critical of Holmes after he called for the European Parliament to have greater powers over the European Commission. Led by Farage, the NEC removed Holmes from power, and Titford was elected leader. In the 2001 general election, UKIP secured 1.5% of the vote, and six of its 428 candidates retained their deposits. It had lost much of its support to the Conservatives, whose leader William Hague had adopted increasingly Eurosceptic rhetoric during his campaign. In 2002, the former Conservative MP Roger Knapman was elected UKIP leader, bringing with him the experience of mainstream politics that the party had lacked. Knapman hired the political campaign consultant Dick Morris to advise UKIP. The party adopted the slogan "say no" and launched a national billboard campaign. In 2004, UKIP reorganised itself nationally as a private company limited by guarantee.

=== Growing visibility: 2004–2014 ===
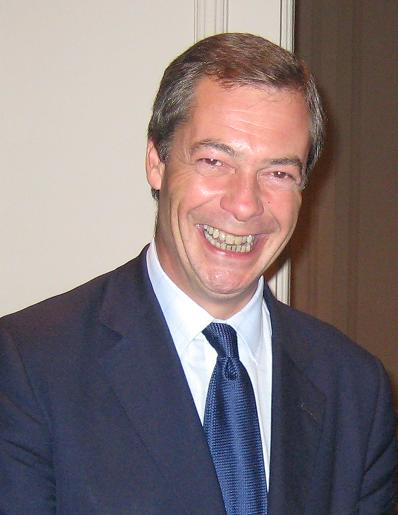
Nigel Farage, leader of the party from 2006 to 2009 and again from 2010 to 2016, and an MEP from 1999 to 2020

UKIP's support increased during the 2004 European Parliament elections, when it placed third, securing 2.6 million votes (16.1%) and winning 12 seats. This had been made possible through increased funding from major donors and the celebrity endorsement of former chat show host Robert Kilroy-Silk, who stood as a candidate in the East Midlands. Kilroy-Silk then criticised Knapman's leadership, arguing that UKIP should stand against Conservative candidates, regardless of whether they were Eurosceptic or not. This position was rejected by many party members, who were uneasy regarding Kilroy-Silk. After Farage and Lott backed Knapman, Kilroy-Silk left the party in January 2005. Two weeks later, he founded his own rival, Veritas, taking a number of UKIP members—including both of its London Assembly members—with him.

After Kilroy-Silk's defection, UKIP's membership declined by a third and donations dropped by over a half. UKIP continued to be widely seen as a single-issue party and in the 2005 general election—when it fielded 496 candidates—it secured only 2.2% of the vote, and 40 candidates had their deposits returned. Electoral support for the BNP grew during this period, with academics and political commentators suggesting that the parties were largely competing for the same voter base, a section of about 20% of the UK population. Given that the BNP had outperformed UKIP in most of the seats that they both contested, many UKIP members, including several figures on the NEC, favoured an electoral pact with them, a proposal that Farage strongly condemned.

In 2006, Farage was elected leader. To attract support, he cultivated an image of himself as a "man of the people", openly smoking and drinking, showing disdain for the established parties, and speaking in an open manner that appeared unscripted. He sought to broaden UKIP's image from that of a single-issue party by introducing an array of conservative policies, including reducing immigration, tax cuts, restoring grammar schools, and climate change denial. In doing so he was attempting to attract disenfranchised former Conservatives who had left the party after its leader, David Cameron, had moved in a socially liberal direction. According to Farage, Cameron was "a socialist" whose priorities were "gay marriage, foreign aid, and wind farms". Cameron was highly critical of UKIP, referring to them as "fruitcakes, loonies, and closet racists". The Conservatives' largest donor, Stuart Wheeler, donated £100,000 to UKIP after criticising Cameron's stance towards the Treaty of Lisbon and the EU. After trust in the mainstream parties was damaged by the parliamentary expenses scandal, UKIP received an immediate surge in support. This helped it in the 2009 European Parliament election, in which it secured 2.5 million votes (16.5%), resulting in 13 MEPs, becoming the second largest party in the European Parliament after the Conservatives. During the election UKIP outperformed the BNP, whose electoral support base collapsed shortly afterward.

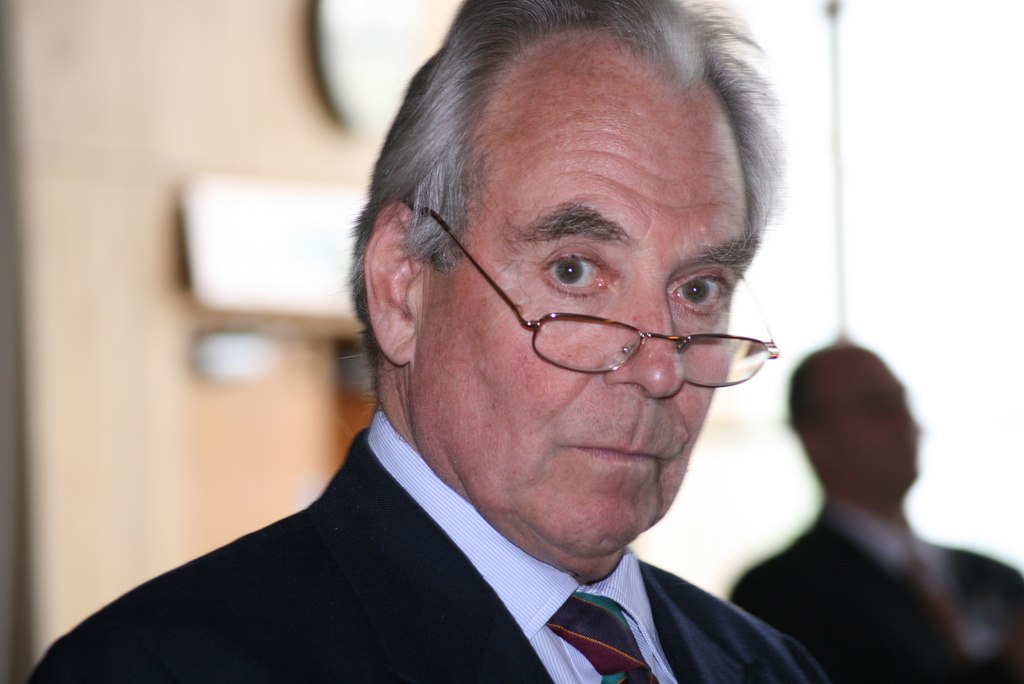
Lord Pearson led the party in 2009.

In September 2009, Farage resigned as leader. The subsequent leadership election was won by Lord (Malcolm) Pearson, who emphasised UKIP's opposition to high immigration rates and Islamism in Britain, calling for a ban on the burqa being worn in public. Pearson was unpopular with the UKIP grassroots, who viewed him as an establishment figure too favourable to the Conservatives. In the 2010 general election, UKIP fielded 558 candidates and secured 3.1% of the vote (919,471 votes), but won no seats. Pearson stood down as leader in August, and Farage was re-elected in the leadership election with more than 60% of the vote.

Farage placed new emphasis on developing areas of local support through growth in local councils. Observing that the party had done well in areas dominated by white blue-collar workers with no educational attainment, and that conversely it had done poorly in areas with high numbers of graduates and ethnic minorities, UKIP's campaign refocused directly at the former target vote. UKIP support would be bolstered by dissatisfaction with the Conservative-Liberal Democrat coalition government and the perception that its austerity policies benefited the socio-economic elite while imposing hardship on most Britons. During this year, UKIP had witnessed far greater press coverage and growing support, with opinion polls placing it at around 10% support in late 2012. UKIP put up a record number of candidates for the 2013 local elections, achieving its strongest local government result, polling an average of 23% in the wards where it stood, and increasing its number of elected councillors from four to 147. Four years earlier it had averaged 16% of the vote. This was the best result for a party outside the big three in British politics since the Second World War, with UKIP being described as "the most popular political insurgency" in Britain since the Social Democratic Party during the 1980s.

=== Entering mainstream politics: 2014–2016 ===
Results of the European Parliament election, 2014 in Great Britain. Districts where UKIP received the largest number of votes are shown in purple.

In March 2014, Ofcom awarded UKIP "major party status". In the 2014 local elections, UKIP won 163 seats, an increase of 128, but did not take control of any council. In the 2014 European Parliament elections, UKIP received the greatest number of votes (27.5%) of any British party, which elected 24 MEPs. The party won seats in every region of Britain, including its first in Scotland. It made strong gains in traditionally Labour voting areas within Wales and the North of England; it for instance came either first or second in all 72 council areas of the latter. The victory established Farage and UKIP as "truly household names". It was the first time since 1906 that a party other than Labour or the Conservatives had won the most votes in a UK-wide election.

UKIP gained its first MP when Conservative defector Douglas Carswell won the seat of Clacton during an October 2014 by-election. In November fellow Conservative defector Mark Reckless became UKIP's second MP in a Rochester and Strood by-election. In the 2015 general election, UKIP secured over 3.8 million votes (12.6% of the total), replacing the Liberal Democrats as the third most popular party, but only secured one seat, with Carswell retaining his seat and Reckless losing his. In the run-up to the election, Farage stated that he would resign as party leader if he did not win South Thanet. On failing to do so, he resigned, although was reinstated three days later when the NEC rejected his resignation. A period of 'civil war' broke out among senior membership between those who favoured Farage's leadership and those seeking a change. In the 2015 Oldham West and Royton by-election the party attacked Jeremy Corbyn as a security risk, but only gained a small increase in support at the expense of the Conservative Party. In the 2016 National Assembly for Wales election, UKIP nearly tripled their share of votes (from 4.7 per cent to 12.5 per cent) and won seven seats. UKIP had also won control of its first UK council, in Thanet, in May 2015; it took overall control from Labour and increased its seats on the council from two to 33.

=== 2016 Brexit referendum ===
To counter the loss of further votes to UKIP, the governing Conservatives, led by David Cameron, promised a referendum on the UK's continued membership of the EU. Rather than taking part in the official Vote Leave campaign, to which various Eurosceptic Conservative and Labour politicians were linked, UKIP affiliated itself with the Leave.EU campaign group. Farage gained regular press coverage during the campaign, in which Leave.EU emphasised what it characterised as the negative impact of immigration on local communities and public services. The June 2016 referendum produced a 51.89% majority in favour of leaving the EU: the accomplishment of UKIP's raison d'être raised questions about the party's future. The loss of its MEPs would result in the loss of its primary institutional representation and a key source of its funding.

=== Decline: 2016–present ===
==== Downward turn (2016–2018) ====
After the referendum, Farage resigned as UKIP leader. Diane James was elected as his successor, but resigned after 18 days. Farage's former deputy, Paul Nuttall, was elected leader that month. In March 2017, the party's only MP, Carswell, left the party to sit as an independent. The following month, Reckless also left UKIP. In the 2017 local elections, UKIP lost all 145 seats it was defending, but gained one on Lancashire County Council. These results led several prominent former UKIP members to call for the party to be disbanded. In the following 2017 general election, UKIP received fewer than 600,000 votes and won no seats. The following day, Nuttall resigned and Steve Crowther took over as interim party leader. In July 2017, it lost its majority on Thanet council when Councillor Beverly Martin defected to the Conservatives; in September all three UKIP councillors on Plymouth City Council defected to the Conservatives, as did Alexandra Phillips, who had been UKIP's head of media for three years.

The UKIP logo, used briefly by the party from 2017 to 2018

In 2017, Henry Bolton, a former soldier, was elected leader. In January 2018, UKIP MEP Jonathan Arnott resigned from the party. In December 2017, former UKIP Suffolk County Council member and parliamentary candidate from the general election in Central Suffolk and North Ipswich, Stephen Searle, murdered his wife Anne Searle at their home in Stowmarket. In January 2018, UKIP's NEC delivered a vote of no confidence in Bolton; only Bolton voted against the motion. He nevertheless refused to resign. In protest, Margot Parker resigned as deputy leader, as did the party's spokesmen for government, education, immigration, and trade and industry. A few days later, all 17 UKIP members of Thurrock Council left the party and formed Thurrock Independents. In February, UKIP members passed a vote of no confidence in Bolton, removing him as leader. He was replaced by Gerard Batten as interim leader until a new leadership election could be held. When the election occurred in April, Batten stood unopposed and was elected.

==== Move towards the far right (2018–2019) ====
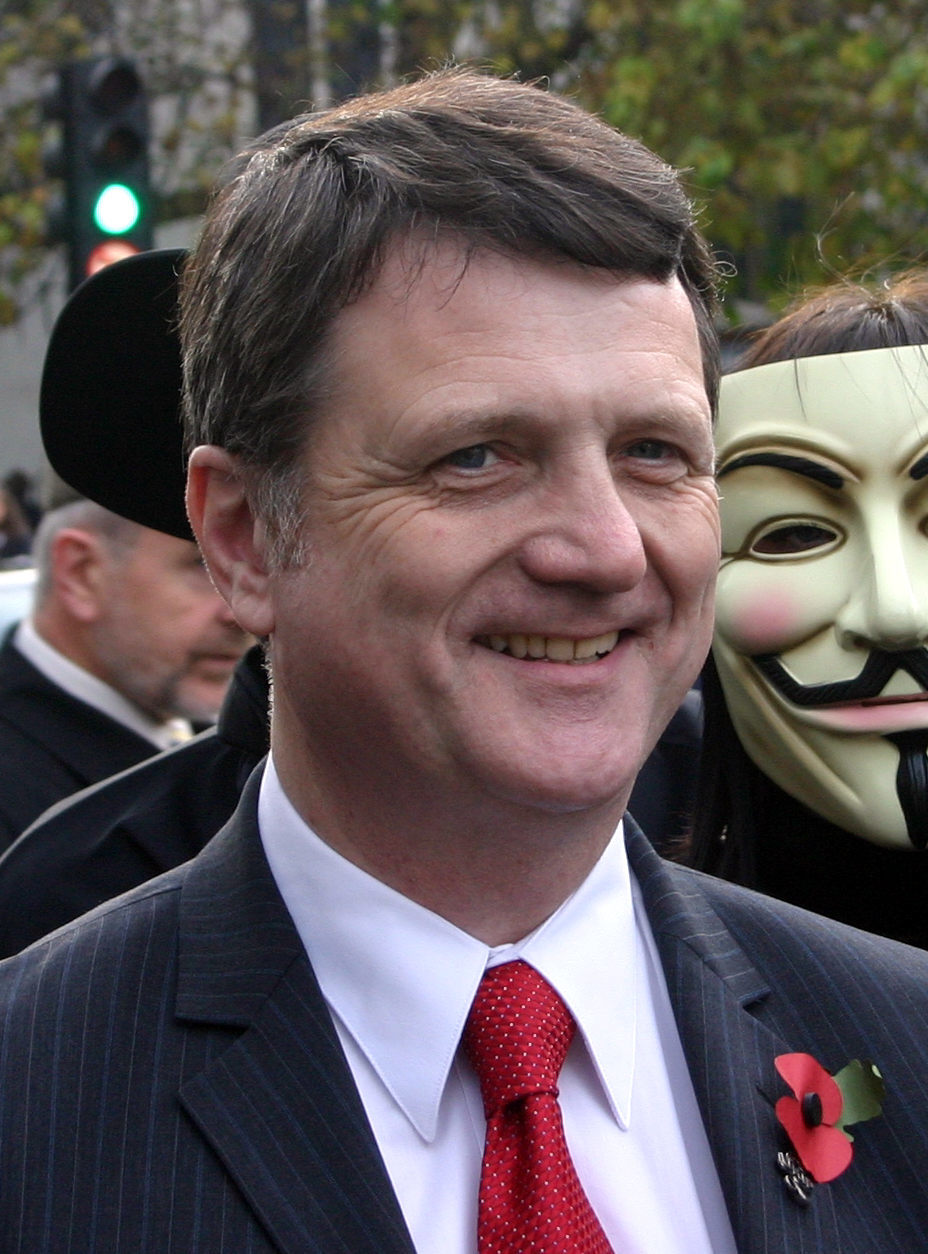
Under Gerard Batten's leadership, UKIP moved towards a far-right stance

In the 2018 local elections, UKIP lost 124 of the 126 seats it was defending, and gained a single seat in Derby, for a net loss of 123. MEP James Carver left UKIP to sit as an independent on 28 May 2018, becoming the sixth UKIP MEP to leave since 2014.

Under the leadership of Henry Bolton, party membership was understood to have fallen to around 18,000 by January 2018. During Batten's interim leadership term, the party avoided insolvency after a financial appeal to members. As the new permanent leader, Batten focused the party more on opposing Islam, which he described as a "death cult", sought closer relations with the right-wing activist Tommy Robinson and his followers, and made Muslim-only prisons party policy (which was criticised as "the first step to Muslim concentration camps"). UKIP was criticised as an "explicitly far-right party" after they invited Paul Joseph Watson as a spokesman. The party saw its membership rise by 15% in July 2018, following the publication of the Chequers Agreement and allowing three prominent far-right activists to join the party. Previous leader Nigel Farage stated he was "really upset" that Robinson could be allowed into the party and that he believed Gerard Batten was marginalising the party.

Batten's appointment of Robinson as an adviser was followed by a wave of high-profile resignations from the party. Farage announced his decision to resign in December 2018, calling Batten "obsessed" with Islam and saying that "UKIP wasn't founded to be a party based on fighting a religious crusade". Former deputy chair Suzanne Evans had left earlier that week after Batten survived a vote of confidence from the party NEC. The former leader of the party in the Welsh Assembly, Caroline Jones, and the MEP William Dartmouth had also cited the party's trajectory to the right as reasons for leaving the party. Another former leader, Paul Nuttall, also left for the same reason. By December 2018, a majority of the party's MEPs had left. Others leaving included Peter Whittle, the party's top vote-winner on the London Assembly.

On 9 December 2018, before an important vote on Brexit legislation, UKIP led a "Brexit Betrayal" rally in central London fronted by Robinson, alongside prominent far-right groups. By April 2019, of 24 UKIP MEPs elected in the 2014 European Election, only four remained members of UKIP. Ten of these MEPs would later move to Nigel's Farage's new Brexit Party (with the party eventually succeeding UKIP politically), whilst O'Flynn defected to the SDP. Most others continued to sit as Independent MEPs.

By April 2019, the British government had agreed an extension to EU membership with the EU until 31 October 2019, which would mean the UK would take part in the 2019 European Parliament elections. Candidates selected by UKIP to run in the election included right-wing YouTube personalities Carl Benjamin and Mark Meechan. Benjamin had caused controversy by making "inappropriate" comments in 2016 about the rape threats to a female Labour MP Jess Phillips, with the UKIP Swindon branch chair calling for him to be deselected. Videos made by Benjamin in which he used racist terms also caused controversy. In May, the 2019 United Kingdom local elections saw UKIP lose around 80% of the seats it was defending. The party was criticised for failing "to capitalise on the collapse of the Conservatives" by commentators. In the European elections later that month, UKIP received 3.3% of the vote and lost all its remaining seats.

On 2 June 2019, Batten resigned his post as party leader as he had promised if he lost his MEP position. In the 2019 UKIP leadership election, Richard Braine was elected UKIP leader and attempted to appoint Batten as deputy leader. Braine's attempt to appoint Batten as the party's deputy leader was blocked by its NEC. Braine was criticised in the press for comments he has made which were considered racist and offensive, including one incident in which he claimed he "often confused" London mayor Sadiq Khan with Mohammad Sidique Khan, one of the 7/7 terror attackers. Braine later further came under fire when he announced he planned to boycott the September 2019 UKIP Party conference in Newport, after fewer than 450 tickets were sold for the conference. The chairman of UKIP, Kirstan Herriot, told members that Braine had attempted to cancel the conference due to the low turnout and was highly critical of this attempted action.

==== Internal instability and wipeout (2019–2024) ====
The UKIP logo used until 2022

In October 2019, UKIP underwent a leadership crisis in the run-up to its NEC elections after it suspended Braine's membership, and by extension, his eligibility to be party leader, over allegations of data theft from party databases. Three other members associated with Braine – Jeff Armstrong, the party's general secretary appointed by Braine; NEC candidate Mark Dent; and Tony Sharp – were also suspended. In response, Braine accused the NEC of carrying out a purge of members. All four members were reported to the National Fraud Intelligence Bureau. On 30 October 2019, Braine resigned as leader of the party. He cited "internal conflict" and an inability to "prevent a purge of good members from the party", referring to the NEC's decision to add "Integrity", an anti-Islam faction within UKIP supporting Tommy Robinson, Batten and Braine, to the party's proscribed list of organisations.

On 7 November 2019, Welsh Assembly Member and UKIP group leader Gareth Bennett resigned from UKIP and chose to sit as an independent in the Welsh Assembly. He stated that he wanted to support Boris Johnson's Brexit deal. As a result, the sole remaining UKIP member of the Welsh Assembly was Neil Hamilton.

In November 2019, Meechan posted a video to his YouTube channel, announcing that he had left UKIP, citing internal disputes and backstabbing within the party over their leadership as his reason for leaving.

On 16 November 2019, NEC member Patricia Mountain was appointed interim leader in preparation for the December general election and the upcoming UKIP leadership election. Only 44 UKIP candidates stood in the December 2019 general election, targeting constituencies that voted to leave the European Union in which the Brexit Party withdrew their candidates for the Conservatives or where the Conservative candidate was in favour of remaining in the EU. On 2 December 2019, Mountain appeared on Sky News for an interview with journalist Adam Boulton as a part of the launch of the election manifesto for UKIP; it lasted for eight minutes and the interview was described by the Evening Standard as a "car crash", and there were reports that she was mistaken for the titular character of Catherine Tate's Nan. Mountain was unable to name a single seat her party was contending and "accidentally called her party racist". UKIP failed to win any seats it contested in the election, and nationwide the party received only 22,817 votes (0.1% of the vote share). This result was the lowest the party had achieved in a general election in its history. The party also failed to retain any deposits, only received more than 1,000 votes in two seats, and, in another two seats, finished behind the satirical Official Monster Raving Loony Party.

In January 2020, David Kurten, UKIP's last remaining London Assembly Member, left UKIP to stand as an independent candidate in the 2020 London Assembly election and the 2020 London mayoral election. Kurten described the politics of both UKIP and the Brexit Party as needing "rebranding" once Britain left the EU on 31 January. Kurten's departure ended UKIP's presence on the London Assembly.

In March 2020, according to a tweet by former leader Gerard Batten, the party was reported to be "close to insolvency".

On 25 June 2020, Freddy Vachha was elected unopposed as leader. He stated that the party "went astray quite a few years ago" and that under his leadership it would "return to our libertarian freedom-loving principles". On 12 September 2020, it was reported that Vachha had been suspended from the party following a formal complaint of bullying and harassment. Later that day, UKIP Wales leader Neil Hamilton was made interim leader. Vachha argued a short time later that he was still leader, and that his suspension was unconstitutional, as he claimed to have appointed Marietta King as chairman in place of Ben Walker a few days earlier. Vachha decided to take legal action, however in December a judge refused his request to fast-track the case. Vachha then dropped his legal case and was ordered to pay the party's legal costs.

In the 2021 Senedd election, UKIP performed poorly and suffered a "complete collapse" of voter support, with the Conservative Party gaining a number of voters who had in previous elections voted UKIP. The party finished seventh with 1.56% of regional list votes. Neil Hamilton, Interim UKIP leader and UKIP's sole MS in the Welsh Senedd lost his seat, ending any representation UKIP had outside of local government in England. In the Scottish Parliament election, the party received just 3,848 (0.14%) list votes across the whole country despite standing in every region in Scotland. In the 2021 local elections, UKIP lost all the seats it was defending from the previous elections in those council areas. Furthermore, in the London mayoral election, the UKIP candidate, Peter Gammons, achieved 0.6% of the total vote, finishing 13th. The party finished ninth in the London Assembly election, down from fourth in 2016.

After a period as acting leader, Hamilton was elected as leader in October 2021, receiving 498 votes of 631 cast (78.9%) against challenger John Poynton. In April 2023, the party removed a longstanding ban of current or former members of far-right groups and parties – including the British National Party (BNP) – from joining the party, and replaced it with a ban of members of several anti-fascist, left-wing, and environmentalist groups. In the May 2023 local elections, it lost all of its remaining council seats leaving the party without representation at any level.

At the start of 2024, Hamilton announced that he would retire as party leader that May, leading to a new leadership contest. Bill Etheridge, Lois Perry, and Anne Marie Waters, who had rejoined the party the previous year after having left to form the For Britain Movement, were announced as candidates for the contest, though Waters subsequently withdrew her candidacy for unspecified personal reasons. Lois Perry was elected on 13 May 2024, and announced upon the calling of the 2024 United Kingdom general election later that month that the party would be entering into an electoral alliance with the English Democrats. On 15 June, after just 34 days as leader, Perry resigned due to health issues.

Deputy leader Nick Tenconi took over as leader for the duration of the campaign, which saw the party's vote further decline from its 2019 levels, earning just 6,350 votes nationwide. Of the 26 candidates nominated, all but three of them finished with fewer than 300 votes, with 17 of them finishing in last place in their constituency. Unlike the 2019 election, however, the party did succeed in retaining one deposit by winning 6.3% of the vote in Stone, Great Wyrley and Penkridge, largely due to Reform UK (as the Brexit Party had renamed itself after the previous election) not nominating a candidate there; the 2,638 votes won by the UKIP candidate Janice Mackay single-handedly accounted for 41.5% of the party's national vote share.

==== Tenconi's leadership (2024–present) ====
After Nick Tenconi took leadership of UKIP, he attempted to move closer to the far-right activist Tommy Robinson, and appointed anti-Islam activist and preacher Calvin Robinson as its lead spokesperson, and also entered into talks with anti-Muslim influencer Katie Hopkins. Since becoming leader, Tenconi has made Christian identity politics an important part of UKIP's campaign. Based on this, some people have described Tenconi and UKIP as Christian nationalist.

A demonstration in Portsmouth in August 2025 was notable for an incident where Tenconi made an arm gesture which was likened by numerous observers to a Nazi salute. Tenconi denied the resemblance, stating that there was "nothing Nazi-esque about the power fist symbol"

The party regained a presence in local government when a Reform UK councillor defected to UKIP, in Kent, in September 2025.

UKIP and Tenconi were involved in the 2025 British anti-immigration protests, organising some of the protests under their "Mass Deportations Tour", which has seen them march or rally in cities such as Glasgow, Nottingham, Liverpool, Newcastle, and London and be met with counter-protesters such as Stand Up To Racism.

On 21 October, a rally planned by UKIP for 25 October in Whitechapel was banned from occurring within the London Borough of Tower Hamlets, an area with a large Muslim population, by the Metropolitan Police. The police said that this action was taken due to a "realistic prospect of serious disorder". UKIP's X account had asked attendees to "reclaim Whitechapel from the Islamists". UKIP accused the police of two-tier policing and of caving in to "sectarian violence" as they believed "far-left and Islamist protest groups" were planning disorder, and changed their plans to instead gather at the Brompton Oratory and march to Speakers' Corner. UKIP's marchers were also prohibited from protesting before 1pm or after 4.30pm. A counter-protest organised by Stand Up To Racism and other local groups remained planned for Whitechapel, and the police further banned Stand Up To Racism from gathering in an area of central London, including near the UKIP protest. Four anti-racist counter-protesters were arrested for breaching this. UKIP's march consisted of about 75 people carrying wooden crosses and England fans.

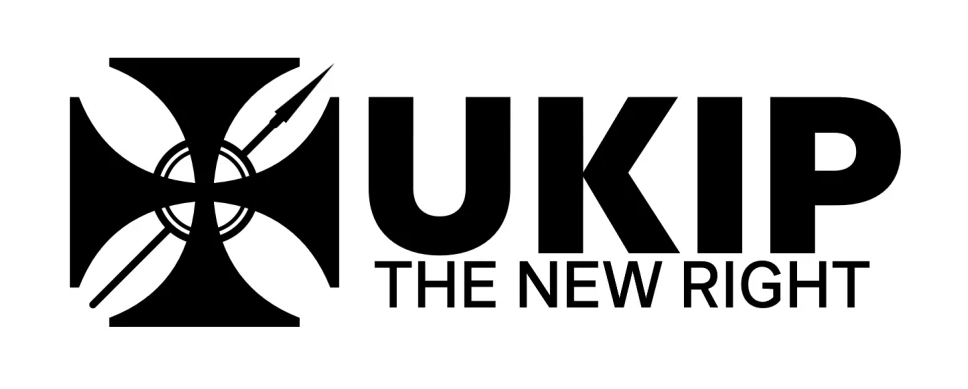
2026 UKIP logo submission to the Electoral Commission

In January 2026, the Electoral Commission published an application by UKIP for a new logo, containing a Templar cross crossed with a spear, and the motto "UKIP: The New Right". The logo has been criticised for appearing to resemble Nazi symbolism, something the party denies, stating that the symbolism is Christian in origin, with the circle in the centre representing the Eucharist and the spear the Holy Lance. The Electoral Commission rejected the logo, with the rationale that it was "Offensive / Likely to mislead voters as the words spelt out in the emblem are unable to be read".

== Ideology and policies ==
=== Right-wing populism and far-right stance ===
In March 2019, The Guardian reported that "a surge in UKIP membership is shifting the party decisively towards the far right, as long-standing moderates are replaced by entrants attracted by an anti-Islam agenda". Academic political scientists and commentators had previously described UKIP as a right-wing populist party, and as part of Europe's wider radical right. The term populism refers to political groups which ideologically contrast "the people" against an elite or group of "dangerous others" whom the populists claim threaten the sovereignty of "the people", and during its establishment in 1993, UKIP's founders explicitly described it as a populist party. At the time, its "ideological heritage" lay within the right wing of the Conservative Party, and UKIP was influenced by the "Tory populism" of Conservative politicians Margaret Thatcher and Enoch Powell.

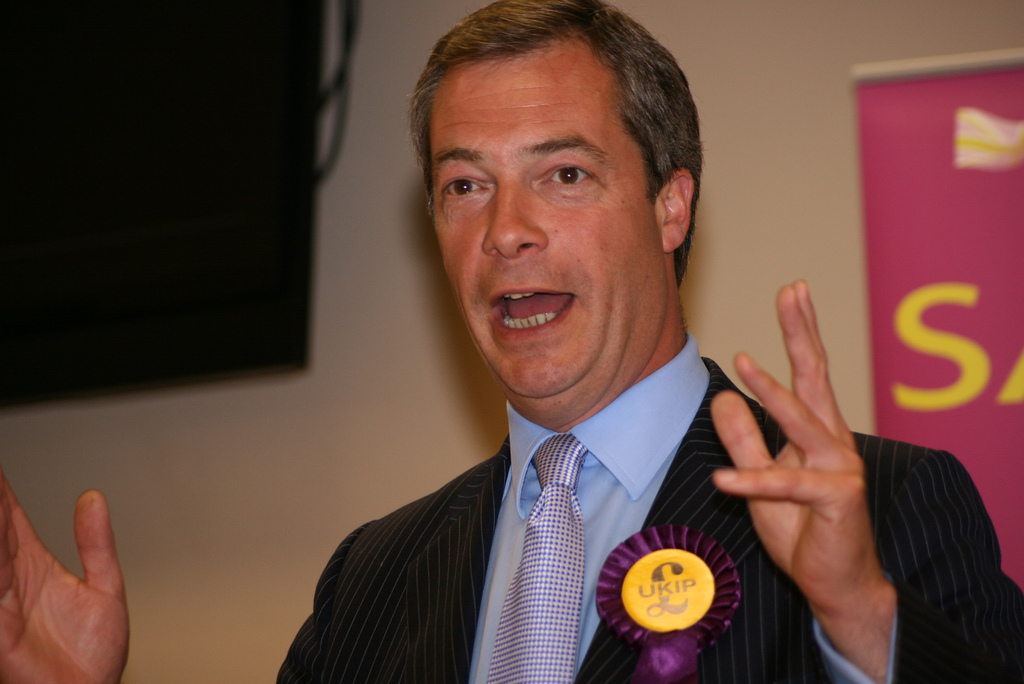
Farage at the 2009 UKIP Conference

The political scientists Amir Abedi and Thomas Carl Lundberg characterised UKIP as an "Anti-Political Establishment" party. The party's rhetoric presents the idea that there is a fundamental divide between the British population and the elite who govern the country. UKIP claims to stand up for ordinary people against this political elite. UKIP politician Bill Etheridge for instance claimed that his party represented "a democratic revolution... the people of Britain rising up and fighting to wrestle power from the elite". Contributing to this anti-establishment message, Farage described the party's supporters as "the People's Army", and he regularly held photo-opportunities and journalistic interviews in a pub, thus cultivating an "erudite everyman" image that contrasted with his past as a commodities trader.

UKIP uses recurring populist rhetoric—for instance by describing its policies as "common sense" and "straight talking"—in order to present itself as a straightforward alternative to the mainstream parties and their supposedly elusive and complex discourse. UKIP presents the UK's three primary parties—the Conservatives, Labour, and Liberal Democrats—as being essentially interchangeable, referring to them with the portmanteau of "LibLabCon". Farage accused all three parties of being social-democratic in ideology and "virtually indistinguishable from one another on nearly all the key issues". Farage has also accused the Scottish National Party of being "the voice of anti-Englishness", suggesting that elements of the Scottish nationalist movement are "deeply racist, with a total hatred of the English".

=== Nationalism and British unionism ===
UKIP espouses a form of British nationalism; it states that it is a "civic" rather than an "ethnic" nationalism, although this categorisation has been disputed by political scientists

UKIP has always had the politics of national identity at its core. The party is nationalist, and its "basic claim—that the highest priority for the British polity is to assure that it is fully governed by the national state—is a nationalist one." The party in the 2010s described its position as being that of civic nationalism, and in its 2014 manifesto explicitly rejected ethnic nationalism by encouraging support from Britons of all ethnicities and religions. Rejecting claims that it is racist, both Sked and later Farage described UKIP as a "non-racist, non-sectarian party".

In UKIP's literature, the party has placed an emphasis on "restoring Britishness" and counteracting what it sees as a "serious existential crisis" exhibited by the "Islamification" of Britain, the "pseudo-nationalisms" of Wales, Scotland, and Ireland, and the multicultural and supranational policies promoted by "the cultural left", describing its own stance as being "unashamedly unicultural". It has been suggested that this attitude compromises the party's claim that its form of British nationalism is civic and inclusive.

UKIP considers itself to be a British unionist party, although its support base is centred largely in England. Farage characterised his party's growth as "a very English rebellion", and has described UKIP as "unashamedly patriotic, proud to be who we are as a nation". The political scientist Richard Hayton argued that UKIP's British unionism reflects "Anglo-Britishness", a perspective that blurs the distinction between Britain and England. With Mycock, Hayton argued that in conflating Englishness with Britishness, UKIP exhibited an "inherent Anglocentrism" that negates the distinct culture of the Scottish, Welsh, and Northern Irish peoples of the United Kingdom. Hayton suggests that UKIP tap into "a vein of nostalgic cultural nationalism" within England, and it has been noted that UKIP's discourse frames the image of Englishness in a nostalgic manner, harking back to the years before the collapse of the British Empire.

UKIP has emphasised the need to correct what it perceives as the United Kingdom's imbalance against England resulting from the "West Lothian question" and the Barnett formula. The party has mobilised English nationalist sentiment brought on by English concerns following the devolution within the UK and the rise of Welsh and Scottish nationalisms. The party initially opposed federalism in the UK, criticising the establishment of the Welsh Assembly and Scottish Parliament. However, in September 2011 Farage and the NEC announced their support for the establishment of an English Parliament to accompany the other devolved governments. In its 2015 manifesto, it promised to make St. George's Day and St. David's Day bank holidays in England and Wales, respectively. Similarly, UKIP's 2017 manifesto pledged to declare 23 June British Independence Day and observe it annually as a national holiday.

=== Euroscepticism, immigration, and foreign policy ===
UKIP embraces the ideology of hard Euroscepticism, also known as "Eurorejectionism". Opposition to the United Kingdom's continued membership of the European Union has been its "core issue" and is "central to the party's identity". UKIP characterises the EU as a fundamentally undemocratic institution and stresses the need to regain what it describes as the UK's national sovereignty from the EU. It presents the EU as being an exemplar of non-accountability, corruption, and inefficiency, and views it as being responsible for the "flooding" of the UK with migrants, in particular from Eastern Europe. UKIP emphasises Euroscepticism to a far greater extent than any of Western Europe's other main radical right parties, and it was only post-2010 that it began seriously articulating other issues. Hayton nevertheless suggested that Euroscepticism still remains "the lens through which most of its other policy positions are framed and understood".

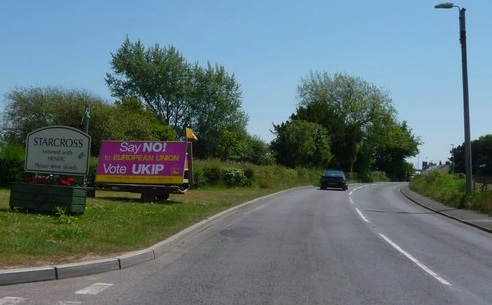
UKIP placard on the side of the road in Starcross, Devon, declaring: "Say NO to European Union"

The party opposed the 2004 enlargement of the European Union into Eastern Europe. UKIP advocated leaving the European Union, stopping payments to the EU, and withdrawing from EU treaties, while maintaining trading ties with other European countries. Initially, UKIP's policy was that, in the event of winning a general election, it would remove the UK from the EU without a referendum on the issue. The party leadership later suggested a referendum, expressing the view that in the case of an exit vote, it could negotiate favourable terms for the country's withdrawal, for instance through ensuring a free trade agreement between the UK and EU. UKIP eventually committed to a referendum in its 2015 manifesto. In contrast to involvement in the EU, UKIP has emphasised the UK's global connections, in particularly to member states of the Commonwealth of Nations. UKIP rejected the description that they were "Europhobes", maintaining that its stance was anti-EU, not anti-European.

UKIP has placed great emphasis on the issue of immigration to the UK, and in 2013 Farage described it as "the biggest single issue facing this party". UKIP attributed British membership of the EU as the core cause of immigration to the UK, citing the Union's open-border policies as the reason why large numbers of East European migrants have moved to Britain. On their campaign billboards, UKIP presented EU migrants as a source of crime, as well as a pressure on housing, the welfare state, and the health service. Farage has emphasised not only the economic impact of migration but also the public anxieties regarding the cultural changes brought by immigration. In its 2009 electoral manifesto, UKIP proposed a five-year ban on any migrants coming to the UK. By 2015, it had modified this to the view that the five-year ban should apply only to unskilled migrants. To regulate the arrival of skilled migrants, it called for the UK to adopt a points-based system akin to that employed by Australia. It advocated the establishment of a watchdog to help curb immigration, and bring the levels of net annual immigration down from the hundreds of thousands to between 20,000 and 50,000, which was the average level in the UK between 1950 and 2000. UKIP calls for all immigrants to require compulsory health insurance, and proposes that migrants be barred from claiming any state benefits until they had been resident in the UK for at least five years.

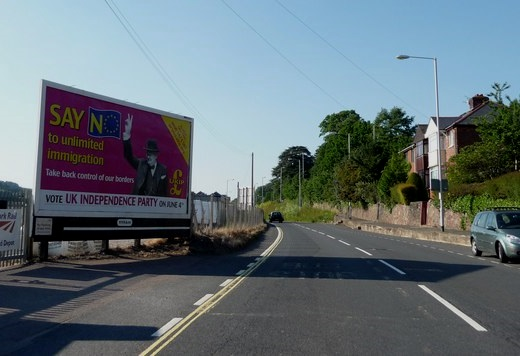
UKIP poster in Exeter in 2009: "Say NO to Unlimited Immigration"

UKIP gained traction from the fact that post-2008, immigration had come to the forefront of many Britons' minds as a result of increased EU migration and its concomitant social changes. By the 2015 general election, the political scientists James Dennison and Matthew Goodwin argued, UKIP had secured "ownership" of the immigration issue among British voters, having secured it from the Conservatives. However, the party's campaign against immigration has been accused of using racism and xenophobia to win votes. Political scientist David Art suggested that in its campaign to restrict immigration, UKIP had "flirted with xenophobia", while Daniel T. Dye stated that part of the party's appeal was its "sometimes-xenophobic populism", and the journalist Daniel Trilling stated that UKIP tapped into the "anti-immigrant and anti-Muslim populism" that was popular in the late 2000s. The political scientist Simon Usherwood stated that UKIP's hardening of immigration policy "risked reinforcing the party's profile as a quasi-far-right grouping", elsewhere stating that the party was only held together by its opposition to the EU and immigration, suggesting that it had "no ideological coherence" beyond that.

In its 2015 campaign, UKIP called for the foreign aid budget to be cut. It has also advocated a 40% increase in the UK's national defence budget. It opposes British military involvement in conflicts that are not perceived to be in the national interest, specifically rejecting the concept of regime change wars through humanitarian interventionism. For instance, in 2014 it opposed the Cameron government's plans to intervene militarily against the government of Bashar al-Assad in the Syrian civil war. In 2018, UKIP pledged to work with anti-EU populist group The Movement. The party was known for its pro-Russia stance on foreign policy.

Under Tenconi's leadership, the party has held repeated street demonstrations calling for "mass deportations" and its 2025 manifesto proposes some level of remigration, targeting immigrants who have resided in the UK for up to 25 years.

=== Economic policy ===
"So what kind of party is UKIP? Ideologically, the party combines a mix of old-style liberal commitments to free markets, limited government and individual freedom with conservative appeals to national sovereignty and traditional social values."

— Political scientist Stephen Driver, 2011

On economic policy, UKIP shares the main three parties' acceptance of the core principles of a capitalist market economy, and the party is generally at ease with the global free market. The academics Simon Winlow, Steve Hall, and James Treadwell commented that on economic issues, "UKIP wants to have its cake and eat it. It wants to retain the best bits of the market economy while discarding what it considers the negative outcomes of 21st-century neoliberalism." They noted for instance that it wanted "free movement of capital" yet wanted to curtail "the free movement of workers across borders".

On economic issues, UKIP's original activist base was largely libertarian, supporting an economically liberal approach. Its economic libertarian views have been influenced by classical liberalism and Thatcherism, with Thatcher representing a key influence on UKIP's thought. Farage has characterised UKIP as "the true inheritors" of Thatcher, claiming that the party never would have formed had Thatcher remained Prime Minister of the UK throughout the 1990s. Winlow, Hall, and Treadwell suggested that a UKIP government would pursue "hard-core Thatcherism" on economic policy. UKIP presents itself as a libertarian party, and the political scientists David Deacon and Dominic Wring described it as articulating "a potent brand of libertarian populism". However, commentators writing in The Spectator, The Independent, and the New Statesman have all challenged the description of UKIP as libertarian, highlighting its socially conservative and economically protectionist policies as being contrary to a libertarian ethos.

UKIP would allow businesses to favour British workers over migrants, and would repeal "much of" Britain's racial discrimination law, which was described as "shocking" by the Conservative–Liberal Democrat coalition government and viewed as discriminatory by others. However, Farage insisted that his comments regarding his party's policies on these matters had been "wilfully misinterpreted". Although the party did not have an official stance on the Transatlantic Trade and Investment Partnership, the party's former international trade spokesperson (Lord Dartmouth) and former health and social care spokesperson (Louise Bours) stated that they did wish the National Health Service to be included in the trade deal, according to the International Business Times.

=== Social policy ===
In The Guardian, commentator Ed Rooksby described UKIP's approach to many social issues as being "traditionalist and socially conservative", while political scientist Stephen Driver has referred to the party's appeals to "traditional social values". UKIP opposed the introduction of same-sex marriage in the United Kingdom. UKIP wants to repeal the Human Rights Act, and remove Britain from both the European Convention on Refugees and the European Convention on Human Rights (ECHR). On the repeal of Britain's signatory to the ECHR, UKIP would like to see a referendum on the reintroduction of the death penalty in the UK.

In 2015, Farage attracted widespread press attention for suggesting that HIV positive patients who were not British citizens should not receive treatment on the NHS. In that same speech he stated that the UK should put the NHS "there for British people and families, who in many cases have paid into the system for years". Farage has spoken in favour of an insurance-based system in the past, which he said would resemble the French and Dutch style system rather than an American style private system, but this was rejected by the party. He has commented, "we may have to think about ways in the future about dealing with health care differently". Critics of UKIP have claimed that the party's real desire is to dismantle and privatise the NHS, a claim bolstered by the publication of leaked documents showing that in 2013 the UKIP NEC privately spoke positively of NHS privatisation.

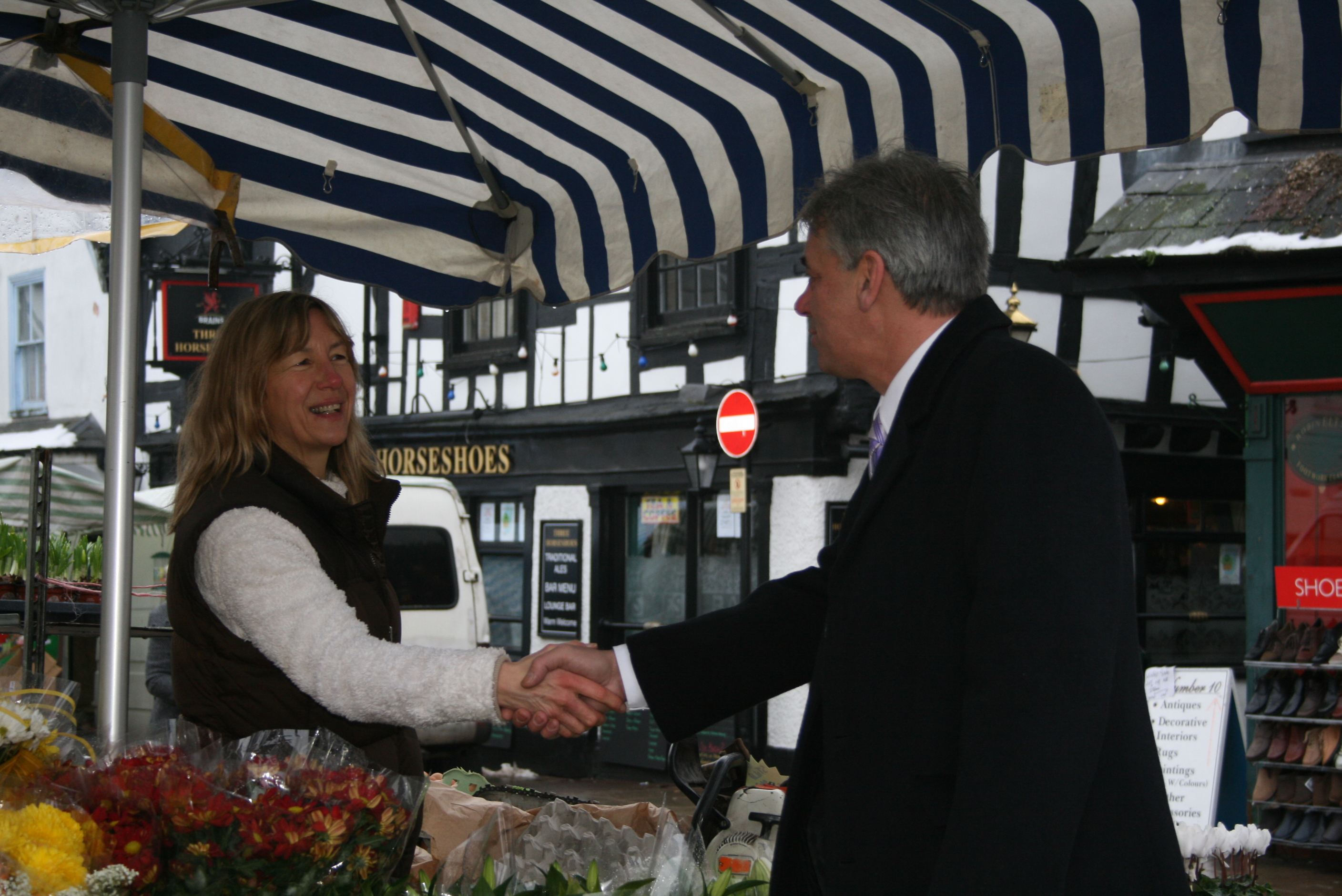
A UKIP candidate campaigning in the run-up to the 2010 general election

Although Farage had long been reticent about focusing on public anxieties surrounding Muslims in Britain, he spoke out following the Charlie Hebdo shooting, claiming that there was a "fifth column" of Islamists in the UK who—while "mercifully small" in number—were "out to destroy our whole civilisation". At the same time he called for Western states to do more to promote their Judeo-Christian heritage, and criticised state multiculturalism for promoting social segregation, discouraging integration, and generating a "tick-box approach" to identity politics. In its 2017 manifesto, UKIP pledged to abolish the existence of sharia courts in the UK and ban the wearing of the niqab and burka in public; it claimed that these were needed to promote the integration of Muslims with wider British society.

UKIP was the only major political party in the United Kingdom at the time that did not endorse renewable energy and lower carbon emissions, and its media output regularly promoted climate change denial. Farage and other senior UKIP figures have repeatedly spoken out against the construction of wind farms, deeming them a blot on the rural landscape. UKIP's media present renewable energy as inefficient and unaffordable, and they promote the use of fossil fuels, nuclear energy and fracking. UKIP has announced that it would repeal the Climate Change Act 2008 and has placed an emphasis on protecting the Green Belt.

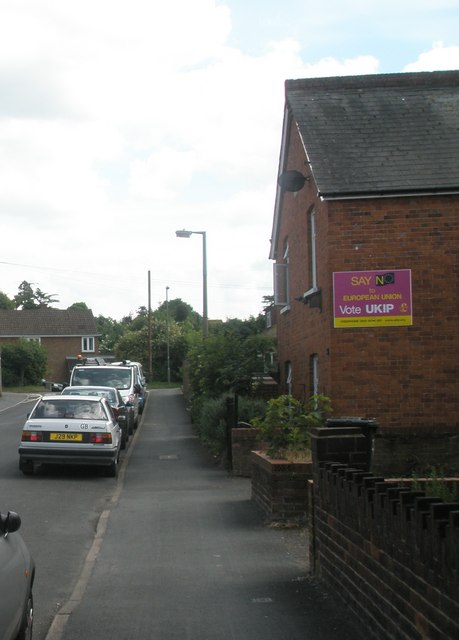
UKIP poster in Egham, Surrey, for the 2009 European elections

In its 2015 election manifesto, UKIP promised to teach a chronological understanding of "British history and achievements" in schools, and it calls for the scrapping of sex education for children under 11. UKIP would introduce an option for students to take an apprenticeship qualification instead of four non-core GCSEs which can be continued at A Level. Schools would be investigated by OFSTED on the presentation of a petition to the Department for Education signed by 25% of parents or governors. UKIP have promoted the scrapping of the government target that 50% of school leavers attend university, and present the policy that tuition fees would be scrapped for students taking approved degrees in science, medicine, technology, engineering or mathematics.

Farage argued that British Overseas Territories like Gibraltar should have representatives in the House of Commons of the United Kingdom, akin to the privileges given to French overseas territories in France. Farage believes that all citizens for whom the British Parliament passes legislation, whether in the United Kingdom or its territories, deserve democratic representation in that Parliament.

== Support ==
=== Financial backing ===
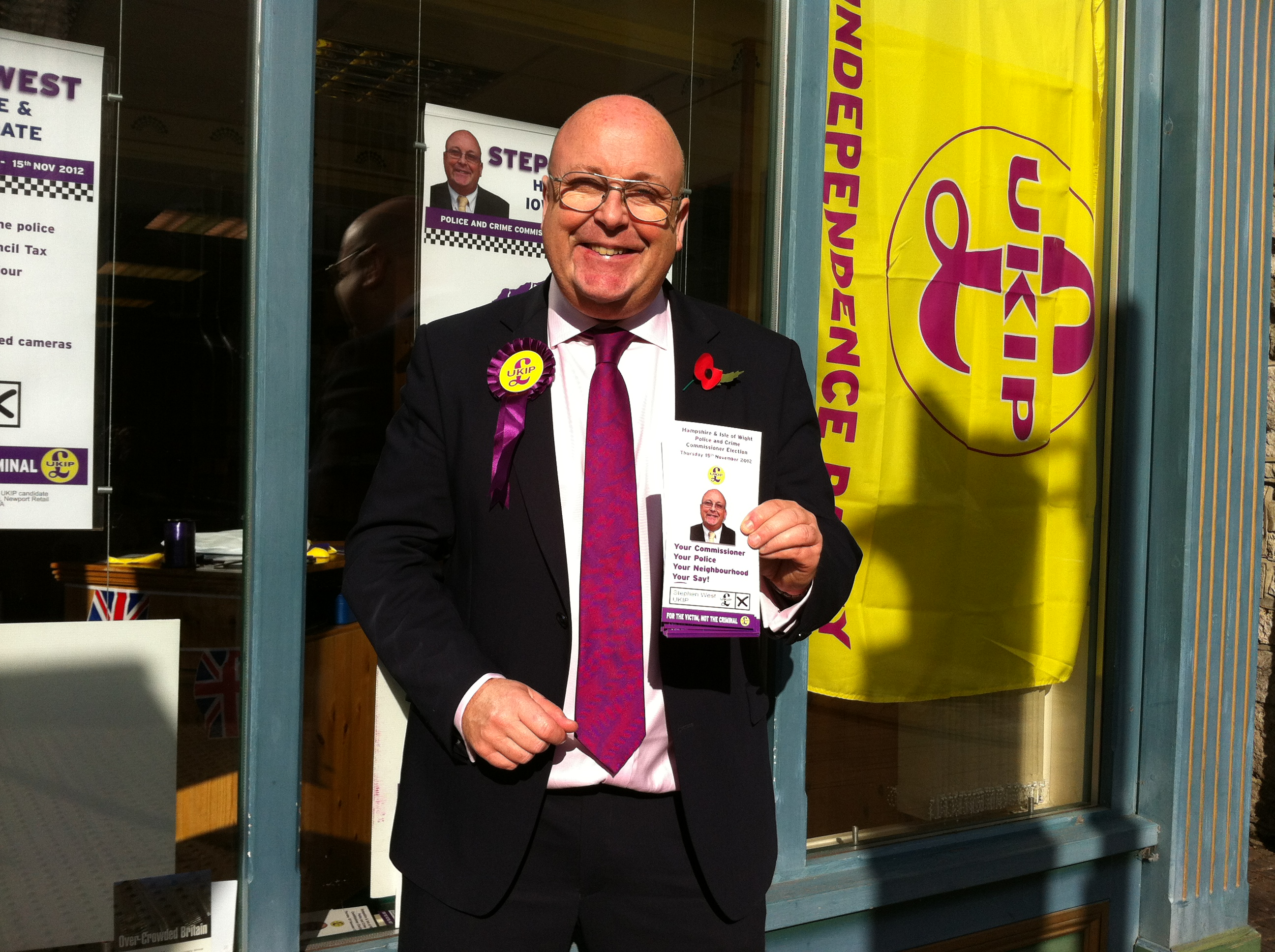
Tadley Town councillor and UKIP candidate for the Hampshire Police and Crime Commissioner, Stephen West, campaigning in Newport high street on the Isle of Wight in 2012

In 2008, Usherwood noted that UKIP relied heavily on a small number of major financial backers. According to The Guardian, a leaked internal report to UKIP's executive committee dated to September 2012 shows that the party's leader argued that "the key to money for us will be the hedge fund industry".

According to UKIP's annual returns to the Electoral Commission, in 2013 the party had a total income of £2,479,314. Of this, £714,492 was from membership and subscriptions, £32,115 from fundraising activities and £1,361,640 from donations. By law, individual donations over £7,500 must be reported.

UKIP has several high-profile backers. In March 2009, the Conservative Party's biggest-ever donor, Stuart Wheeler, donated £100,000 to UKIP after criticising Cameron's stance towards the Treaty of Lisbon. He was then expelled from the Conservatives and in 2011 appointed treasurer of UKIP. In October 2014, Arron Banks, who previously gave £25,000 to the Conservatives, increased his UKIP donation from £100,000 to £1 million after Hague said he had never heard of him. The multi-millionaire Paul Sykes has helped finance the party, donating over £1 million to its 2014 campaign at the European Parliament.

In December 2014, Richard Desmond, proprietor of Express Newspapers, donated £300,000 to UKIP. Desmond had previously made the UKIP peer David Stevens his deputy chairman. The donation indicated that Desmond's papers, the Daily Express, Sunday Express, Daily Star and Daily Star Sunday, would back UKIP in the 2015 general election. Three weeks before the election, Desmond gave the party a further £1 million.

In September 2016, the major UKIP donor, Arron Banks, said that UKIP would be "dead in the water" if Diane James did not become leader. Following her departure after 18 days, Banks said that he would leave UKIP if Steven Woolfe was prevented from running for leader, and if two other members remained in the party: "If Neil Hamilton and Douglas Carswell [UKIP's only MP] remain in the party, and the NEC decide that Steven Woolfe cannot run for leader, I will be leaving UKIP".

=== Membership ===
UKIP's membership numbers increased from 2002 to the time of the 2004 European Parliament election, before hovering around the 16,000 mark during the late 2000s. In 2004, the party claimed 20,000 members, with this remaining broadly stable, and in June 2007 it had a recorded 16,700 members. By July 2013, the figure had grown to 30,000 before ending the year at 32,447. In 2014, the number was 36,000 on 22 April, by 7 May reached 37,000 and on 19 May, less than a fortnight later and only three days before the 2014 European Parliament election, rose to 38,000. In January 2015, UKIP membership was the fifth-highest of British parties.

Membership was 45,000 in May 2015, but since then has fallen to 32,757 in November 2016, and as low as 18,000 under Henry Bolton by January 2018.

In June 2018, four political activists known through social media – Paul Joseph Watson, Mark Meechan, Carl Benjamin, and Milo Yiannopoulos – joined the party. This was followed by the party gaining around 500 members.

In July 2018, it was reported the party had attracted 3,200 new members, a 15% increase.

The party's report to The Electoral Commission of its accounts as of 31 December 2020 stated the party had a membership of 3,888.

=== Voter base ===
UKIP's voters are not single-issue Europhobes or political protesters, they share a clear and distinct agenda, mixing deep Euroscepticism with clear ideas about immigration, national identity and the way British society is changing. The conflict between UKIP's voters and the political mainstream reflects a deep-seated difference in outlook among voters from different walks in life. Those who lead and staff the three main parties are all from the highly educated, socially liberal middle classes, who are comfortable in an ethnically and culturally diverse, outward looking society... Those who lead and staff UKIP, and those who vote for them, are older, less educated, disadvantaged and economically insecure Britons, who are profoundly uncomfortable in the 'new' society, which they regard as alien and threatening.

— Political scientists Robert Ford and Matthew Goodwin, 2014.

In its early years, UKIP targeted itself towards southern English, middle-class Eurosceptic voters, those who had been supporters of the Conservative Party until John Major's Conservative government signed the Maastricht Treaty. This led to the widespread perception that UKIP's supporters were primarily middle-class ex-Conservative voters, with commentator Peter Oborne characterising UKIP as "the Conservative Party in exile".

After 2009, UKIP refocused its attention to appeal primarily to white British, working-class, blue-collar workers; those who had traditionally voted Labour or in some cases for Thatcher's Conservatives but who had ceased voting or begun to vote BNP since the emergence of the New Labour project in the 1990s. In this way, UKIP's support base does not line up with the historical left-right divide in British politics, instead being primarily rooted in class divisions. This mirrored the voting base of other radical right parties across Western Europe which had grown since the early 1990s. This scenario had come about following the rapid growth of the middle-classes and the concomitant decline of the working-class population in Western Europe; the centre-left, social-democratic parties who had traditionally courted the support of the working classes largely switched their attention to the newly emergent middle-classes, leaving their initial support base increasingly alienated and creating the vacuum which the radical right exploited.

On the basis of their extensive study of data on the subject, in 2014 the political scientists Matthew Goodwin and Robert Ford concluded that "UKIP's support has a very clear social profile, more so than any of the mainstream parties. Their electoral base is old, male, working class, white and less educated". They found that 57% of professed UKIP supporters were over the age of 54, while only one in 10 was under 35, which they attributed to the fact that UKIP's socially conservative and Eurosceptic platform appealed far more to Britain's older generations that their younger counterparts, who were more socially liberal and less antagonistic towards the EU.

Males accounted for 57% of UKIP supporters, which Ford and Goodwin suggested was due to women voters being put off by a number of high-profile sexist remarks made by UKIP candidates. A vast majority of UKIP supporters, 99.6%, identified as white, reflecting the fact that ethnic minorities tended to avoid the party. Over half, or 55%, of UKIP supporters had left school aged 16 or under, with only 24% having attended university, suggesting that the party primarily appealed to the least educated voters in society. Ford and Goodwin also found that UKIP's support base was more working-class than that of any other party, with 42% of supporters in blue-collar jobs. Ford and Goodwin described UKIP's voters as primarily comprising the "left behind" sector of society, "older, less skilled and less well educated working-class voters" who felt disenfranchised from the mainstream political parties which had increasingly focused on attracting the support of middle-class swing voters.

Ford and Goodwin nevertheless noted that UKIP was "not a purely blue-collar party but an alliance of manual workers, employers and the self-employed." Geoffrey Evans and Jon Mellon highlighted that UKIP receive "a greater proportion of their support from lower professionals and managers" than from any other class group. They highlighted that polls repeatedly demonstrated that UKIP drew more votes from Conservative voters than Labour ones. They suggested that the assumption that working-class voters who supported UKIP had previously been Labour voters was misplaced, suggesting that these people had ceased voting for Labour "a long time before UKIP were an effective political presence", having been alienated by Labour's "pro-middle class, pro-EU and, as it eventually turned out, pro-immigration agenda". In 2011, Goodwin, Ford, and David Cutts published a study that identified Euroscepticism as the main causal factor for voters supporting UKIP, with concern over immigration levels and distrust of the political establishment also featuring as important motives. They noted, however, that during elections for the European Parliament, UKIP was able to broaden its support to gain the vote of largely middle-class Eurosceptics who vote Conservative in other elections.

Ukip has become more than the single issue on which it was founded: under Farage's leadership it has become a welcoming home for the many in British society who feel that 'the system' isn't working for them, or has left them behind, economically, socially or politically. In so doing, it has gained supporters from across the political spectrum, including many old Labour voters in economically distressed regions of the country.

— Political scientist Simon Usherwood, 2016.

From their analysis of the data, Ford and Goodwin stated that UKIP's support base has "strong parallels" both with that of western Europe's other radical right parties and with the BNP during their electoral heyday. Conversely, an earlier study by Richard Whitaker and Philip Lynch, based on polling data from YouGov, concluded that UKIP voters were distinct from those of far-right parties. The authors found that voter support for UKIP correlated with concerns about the value of immigration and a lack of trust in the political system, but the biggest explanatory factor for their support of UKIP was Euroscepticism. A further study by the same authors suggests that UKIP voters' core beliefs align very closely to those of the UKIP candidates; particularly so on issues surrounding European integration, which has resulted in Conservative voters switching to UKIP due to Conservative divisions on this issue. One study found that 63% of UKIP voters considered themselves to be right-wing, while 22% thought centrist and 16% thought leftist. 81% believed that immigration undermined British culture, a view shared by only half the wider British population. On economic issues, there was a divide between UKIP voters and the party itself. In contrast to the party's economic liberalism, UKIP supporters often held more leftist attitudes to the economy, with almost 80% opining that big business took advantage of working people and almost 70% thinking that privatisation had gone too far.

UKIP has been most successful along England's eastern and southern coasts, in parts of south-west England, and in the Labour heartlands of Northern England and Wales. It has not done well in London and in university towns and urban areas with younger populations like Oxford, Cambridge, Manchester, and Brighton. It has done well in areas with large numbers of old, white, and poorer people, and weaker in areas with larger numbers of younger, more ethnically and culturally diverse, and financially secure people. Ford and Goodwin noted that UKIP "barely registers" with young Britons, graduates, ethnic minorities, and pro-EU voters. According to an Opinium poll in December 2014 on the views of 17- to 22-year-olds, Farage was the least popular political leader. Only 3% of young people questioned said that they intended to vote for UKIP, compared with 19% among voters of all ages. The 17% who said they would vote outside the three main parties were four times more likely to vote for the Green Party than for UKIP. Conversely, a March 2015 Ipsos Mori poll found among 18- to 34-year-olds UKIP was polling nearly as well as the Green Party, somewhat contradicting the idea that Farage lacked appeal for younger voters. On the basis of their fieldwork among supporters of the English Defence League (EDL), an anti-Islam social movement, Winlow, Hall, and Treadwell noted that most EDL supporters whom they encountered intended to vote for UKIP in the build-up to the 2015 general election.

UKIP supporters are sometimes nicknamed "Kippers". In May 2017, in response to large defections from the party, Goodwin said "Former Kippers did not walk but literally sprinted over to the Conservatives."

== Organisation ==
=== Leadership ===
Leader of the UK Independence Party
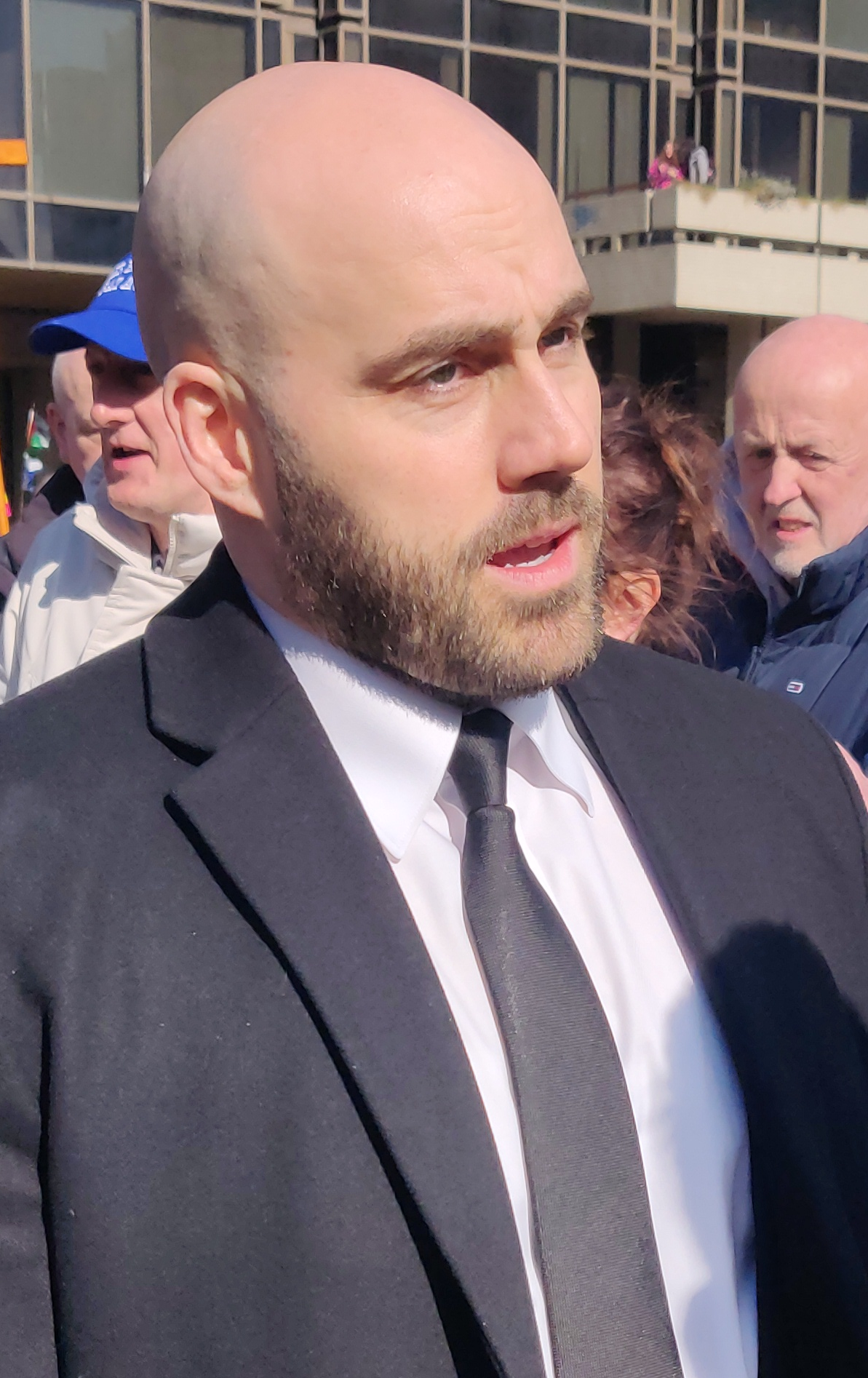
- Incumbent; Nick Tenconi since 16 June 2024
- Term length: Four years
- Inaugural holder: Alan Sked
- Formation: 3 September 1993

According to Part VII of the UKIP constitution, the party leader is voted for by postal ballot by all paid-up party members "in good standing". The winner is the candidate with the simple majority of votes cast. If there is only one valid candidate, they are elected without a ballot. While the default term is four years, the leader can extend up to a year if there is an imminent General or European Parliament election; this must be approved by at least two-thirds of the 12-person NEC. If at least nine NEC members endorse a vote of no confidence in the leader, an emergency general meeting (EGM) will be called. When the leadership becomes vacant unexpectedly, the NEC has 14 days to name an interim leader who exercises all leadership functions until the next leadership election. The leader has the power to name a Deputy Leader of their own choice and assign them any duty they choose.

Leader		Took office	Left office	Notes
1	Alan Sked	3 September 1993	July 1997	Party founder; left party in 1997
	Craig Mackinlay was acting leader during this interim			
2	Michael Holmes	September 1997	22 January 2000	MEP 1999–2002; left party in 2000
3	Jeffrey Titford	22 January 2000	5 October 2002	MEP 1999–2009; left party in 2023
4	Roger Knapman	5 October 2002	12 September 2006	MEP 2004–2009
5	Nigel Farage	12 September 2006	27 November 2009	Former chairman; MEP 1999–2020; left party in 2018
6	The Lord Pearson of Rannoch	27 November 2009	2 September 2010	Member of House of Lords; left party in 2019
	Jeffrey Titford was acting leader during this interim			
(5)	Nigel Farage	5 November 2010	16 September 2016	
7	Diane James	16 September 2016	4 October 2016 (Note: Diane James won the September 2016 leadership election but resigned 18 days later, prior to taking office. As the relevant paperwork required by the Electoral Commission was not processed before her resignation due to her writing vi coactus after her signature on the paperwork, legally Farage remained the leader of UKIP during James's tenure. Farage continued to act as interim leader of UKIP until the November 2016 election.)	Leader-elect, MEP 2014–2019; left party in 2016
	Nigel Farage was acting leader during this interim			
8	Paul Nuttall	28 November 2016	9 June 2017	Deputy leader 2010–2016; MEP 2009–2019; left party in 2018
	Steve Crowther was acting leader during this interim			
9	Henry Bolton	29 September 2017	17 February 2018	Left party in 2018
	Gerard Batten was acting leader during this interim			
10	Gerard Batten	14 April 2018	2 June 2019	MEP 2004–2019
Piers Wauchope was acting leader during this interim
11	Richard Braine	10 August 2019	30 October 2019	Suspended from party in October 2019; subsequently resigned as leader
Patricia Mountain was acting leader during this interim until 25 April 2020
Leadership was vacant until 22 June 2020
12	Freddy Vachha	22 June 2020	12 September 2020	Chairman of UKIP London, Leadership candidate in 2019. Suspended from party on 12 September 2020
13	Neil Hamilton	12 September 2020	13 May 2024	Initially served as interim leader; substantiated on 19 October 2021
14	Lois Perry	13 May 2024	15 June 2024	
Nick Tenconi was interim leader during this period
15	Nick Tenconi	5 February 2025	incumbent	

=== Deputy leadership ===
Deputy Leader		Tenure	Notes
1	Craig Mackinlay	1997–2000	Left party in 2005
2	Graham Booth	2000–02	MEP 2002–2008; died 2011
3	Mike Nattrass	2002–06	MEP 2004–2014; left party in 2013
4	David Campbell Bannerman	2006–10	MEP since 2009; left party in 2011
5	The Viscount Monckton of Brenchley	Jun–Nov 2010	Leader of UKIP in Scotland, 2013
6	Paul Nuttall	2010–16	MEP since 2009; left party in 2018
7	Peter Whittle	2016–17	London AM since 2016; left party in 2018
8	Margot Parker	2017–18	MEP 2014–2019; left party in 2019
9	Mike Hookem	2018–19	MEP 2014–2019
10	Pat Mountain	2020	Interim Leader 2019, NEC Member
11	Rebecca Jane	2022–2024	
12	Nick Tenconi	May – June 2024	

=== Party chairman ===
Chairman		Tenure	Notes
1	Nigel Farage	1998–2000	Later became Party Leader
2	Mike Nattrass	2000–02	
3	David Lott	2002–04	
4	Petrina Holdsworth	2004–05	
5	David Campbell Bannerman	2005–06	
6	John Whittaker	2006–08	
7	Paul Nuttall	2008–2010	Later became Party Leader
8	Steve Crowther	2010–2016	
9	Paul Oakden	2016–18	
10	Tony McIntyre	2018	
11	Kirstan Herriot	2018–2019	
12	Ben Walker	2020–	

=== Regions ===
UKIP's organisation is divided into 12 regions: London, South East, South West, Eastern, East Midlands, West Midlands, Yorkshire, North East, North West, Wales, Northern Ireland, and Scotland. An additional 13th branch operates in the British Overseas Territory of Gibraltar; it held its first public meeting at the Lord Nelson pub in April 2013.

At the end of 2013, UKIP Scotland was dissolved after infighting tore the regional party apart; the party's administrative body was dissolved, Mike Scott-Hayward (the chairman and chief fundraiser) quit, and Farage fired Lord (Christopher) Monckton via email. The national party and UKIP Scotland focused on supporting the candidates for the 2014 European Parliament election in the United Kingdom. After David Coburn won an MEP seat in Scotland in those elections, he was elected as leader of UKIP Scotland.

Veteran and former long-serving Antrim and Newtownabbey-based councillor, Robert Hill was appointed by Gerard Batten as UKIP's Spokesman for Northern Ireland in May 2018. In August 2018, Welsh Assembly Member Gareth Bennett was elected as leader of UKIP in Wales after a membership ballot.

== Representatives ==
=== House of Commons ===
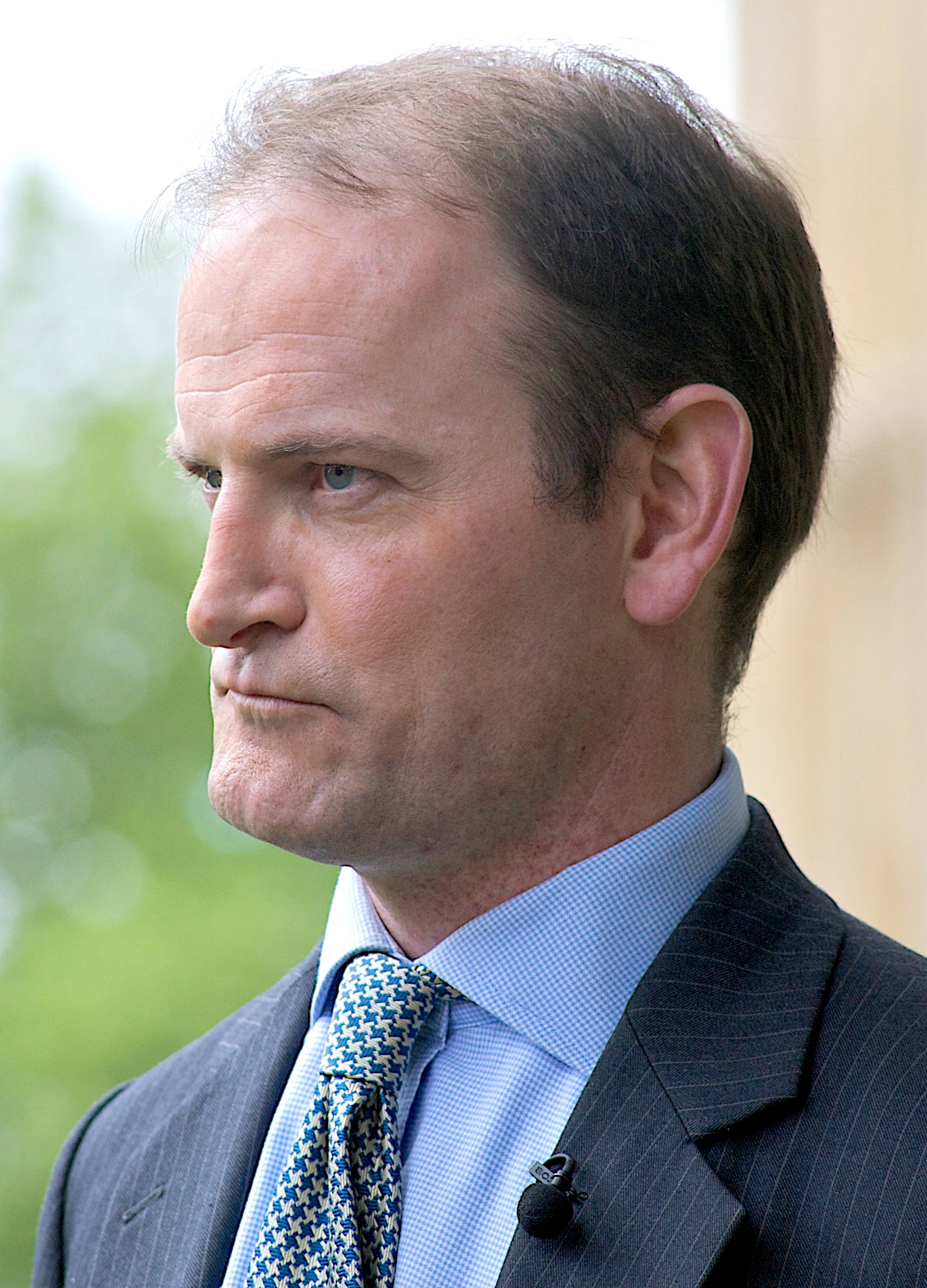
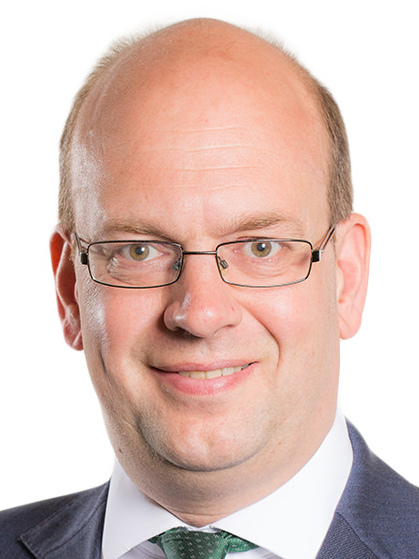
Douglas Carswell and Mark Reckless, UKIP's only elected MPs. The former represented UKIP from 2014 to 2017; the latter from 2014 to 2015.

In the UK, the first-past-the-post voting system for electing MPs to the House of Commons was a significant barrier to UKIP, whose support was widely distributed across different areas rather than being strongly focused in particular constituencies. Further, the system encouraged tactical voting, with many UKIP supporters believing that a vote for the party would be a wasted vote. Recognising this, Farage believed that the best way to win a seat in the House of Commons was to win a by-election, with UKIP contesting a number of these from 2010 onward. Over the next few years, it contested a number of by-elections around the country, coming second in both Barnsley Central and Rotherham. In 2008, Bob Spink, the MP for Castle Point, resigned the Tory whip (becoming an independent), but in April that year joined UKIP. However, in November he appeared again as an independent in Commons proceedings, ultimately losing the seat to a Conservative in 2010.

In 2014, two Conservative MPs changed allegiance to UKIP and resigned their seats to fight by-elections for UKIP. Douglas Carswell won the Clacton by-election on 9 October, making him the first MP to be elected representing UKIP. Mark Reckless was also victorious in the Rochester and Strood by-election on 20 November. At the 2015 general election, Carswell kept his seat in Clacton but Reckless lost Rochester to the Conservative Kelly Tolhurst. UKIP had 3,881,129 votes (12.6%) and was the third largest party on vote share, yet it won only one seat. Because of this, there were calls from some in UKIP for a voting reform in favour of proportional representation. Carswell quit the party in March 2017 to become an independent, leaving UKIP without any MPs in the Commons. In the 2017 election, a snap election initiated by PM Theresa May and scheduled for 8 June 2017, UKIP got 1.9% of the votes (after 12.6% in the 2015 election) and no seats in the House of Commons.

=== House of Lords ===
On 24 June 1995, UKIP gained its first member of the House of Lords, Lord Grantley, who had joined the party in 1993 from the Conservatives and had recently succeeded to his father's titles. However, with the coming House of Lords Act 1999, he decided not to stand for election as a continuing member, and so left the House in November 1999. Earlier in 1999, UKIP had gained a second peer in the House of Lords, The Earl of Bradford, but he, too, left the House in November 1999 because of the House of Lords Act. Lord Pearson of Rannoch and Lord Willoughby de Broke both defected to UKIP in 2007, giving the party its first representation in the House of Lords since the departure of Lord Grantley and Lord Bradford. Lord Pearson went on to serve as party leader from November 2009 to September 2010. On 18 September 2012, Lord Stevens of Ludgate joined UKIP, having sat as an independent Conservative since his expulsion from the Conservatives in 2004. In Autumn 2018, Lord Willoughby de Broke left UKIP, reducing the party's representation in the upper house back down to two. Lord Stevens also left the party, in December 2018, leaving former leader Lord Pearson as UKIP's sole peer. In October 2019, Lord Pearson resigned his membership of the party.

=== Devolved parliaments and assemblies ===
UKIP competes electorally in all four parts of the United Kingdom.

==== Northern Ireland ====
In October 2012, UKIP gained its first representation in a devolved Assembly the Northern Ireland Assembly in David McNarry, MLA for Strangford, who had left the Ulster Unionist Party. The party however failed to continue its representation at the 2016 election, coming within a hundred votes of taking a seat in East Antrim. This seat was unsuccessfully contested in the 2017 election.

==== Scotland ====
UKIP's support has been particularly weak in Scotland, where it has no representatives in the devolved parliament. UKIP fielded candidates at the Scottish Parliament election on 5 May 2011, when its platform included a commitment to keep the Scottish Parliament in Edinburgh, while replacing the separately-elected Members of the Scottish Parliament with the Members of the House of Commons elected in Scotland. The party fielded candidates on the regional lists in the 2016 election without any success. In the 2021 Scottish Parliament election candidates were again fielded on regional lists.

==== Wales ====
The party also fielded candidates for the Senedd. In the 2016 election, it entered the Assembly for the first time, winning seven of 60 seats. However, following the resignations of Caroline Jones, Mark Reckless, Nathan Gill and Michelle Brown, by March 2019 the party's representation had fallen to three AMs. UKIP ceased to have a formal Welsh Assembly group after David Rowlands resigned in May 2019 to form a new Brexit Party group with Reckless, Jones and Mandy Jones (who had replaced Nathan Gill on his resignation as an AM). UKIP were left without any Senedd members after the 2021 Senedd election

=== Local government ===
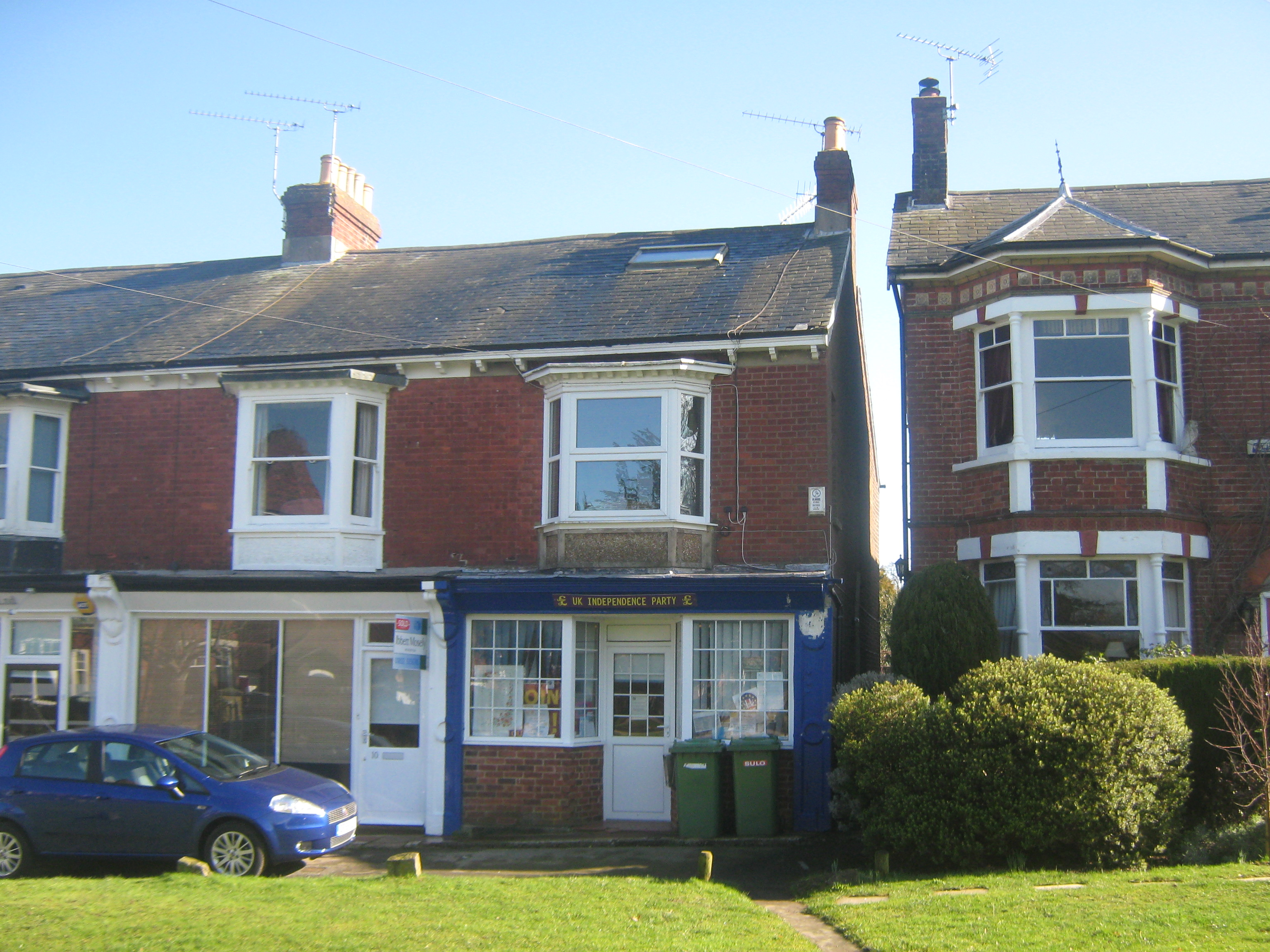
UKIP office in Tunbridge Wells

UKIP initially paid little attention to local government elections. However, this changed after Farage observed that building localised strongholds of support in various parts of the country had been the process by which the Liberal Democrats had entered the House of Commons, and that this was a strategy that could benefit UKIP. UKIP subsequently focused on the 2011 local elections, in which it fielded over 1,100 candidates, winning seven seats and becoming the main opposition in over 100.

The first UKIP local council election win occurred when one of its members was elected to South Cambridgeshire District Council in 2000. A number of Conservative, Liberal Democrat, Labour and Independent local councillors in all four constituent nations of the UK defected to UKIP over subsequent years, with the most recent defections to date (May to July 2013) coming from former Conservative councillors in the London Boroughs of Merton, Richmond upon Thames and Havering, and from Labour in Northampton and North-East Lincolnshire. In May 2013, 33 English and one Welsh council held local elections, with UKIP gaining 139 seats for a total of 147, with significant gains in Lincolnshire, Norfolk and Kent.

In the 2013 local elections, UKIP won 147 seats and established itself as the largest opposition party in six English county councils. At the 2013 and 2014 local elections, UKIP made significant gains to become the fourth largest party in terms of councillors in England, and fifth largest in the UK, with over 300 seats (out of about 21,000). In the 2015 local elections, UKIP took control of Thanet District Council, its first majority control of a council. However, the party lost control later in the year after several of its councillors defected and it lost its majority. UKIP later took back control as a majority after winning the 2016 Northwood ward by-election, taking its number of councillors up to 29. In the 2016 local elections, UKIP won 58 council seats, an increase of 25. In the 2017 United Kingdom local elections, UKIP lost all of the seats it was defending but gained one from Labour on Lancashire County Council. in the 2018 United Kingdom local elections, UKIP lost all but three of the 126 seats it was defending. In the 2019 United Kingdom local elections, UKIP suffered severe losses, with its number of councillors collapsing by 145 to 31, in the districts where votes were held that year. Its worst result was in Thanet where it lost 33 councillors.

In the 2021 United Kingdom local elections the party's support fell away and all the 48 council seats in England the party were defending were lost. No seats were won in the London Assembly, Police and Crime Commissioners or elections for mayors. The 2022 local elections saw the party lose all three seats it was defending from 2018.

In the 2023 local elections, the party lost all remaining representation at council level; only one incumbent councillor defended their seat, out of the six seats UKIP contested, and losing 25 councillors from 2019, the last time the seats were up for election. The party now only has elected representatives on parish and town councils, the lowest level of local government; party chairman Ben Walker said the party had "about 30 parish councillors". During the elections, Labour made significant inroads into Leave-voting areas that UKIP in which were formerly strongly competitive, and notably won overall control of Thanet District Council, that UKIP either controlled or were the largest party on between 2015 and 2019.

After a period without elected representation, UKIP saw a surprise defection in September 2025, in the form of Amelia Randall, a Kent County Councillor for the Birchington and Rural ward, who joined the party. She had been elected as a Reform UK candidate in the May election, and had stood for the party in Herne Bay and Sandwich at the 2024 general election.

=== European Parliament ===
As a result of its hard Eurosceptic approach, UKIP does not recognise the legitimacy of the European Parliament, and under Sked's leadership refused to take any of the EP seats that it won. This changed after 1997, when the party decided that its elected representatives would take such seats to publicise its anti-EU agenda. As a result of the 1999 European parliament election, three UKIP MEPs were elected to the European Parliament. Together with Eurosceptic parties from other nations, they formed a new European parliamentary group called Europe of Democracies and Diversities (EDD).

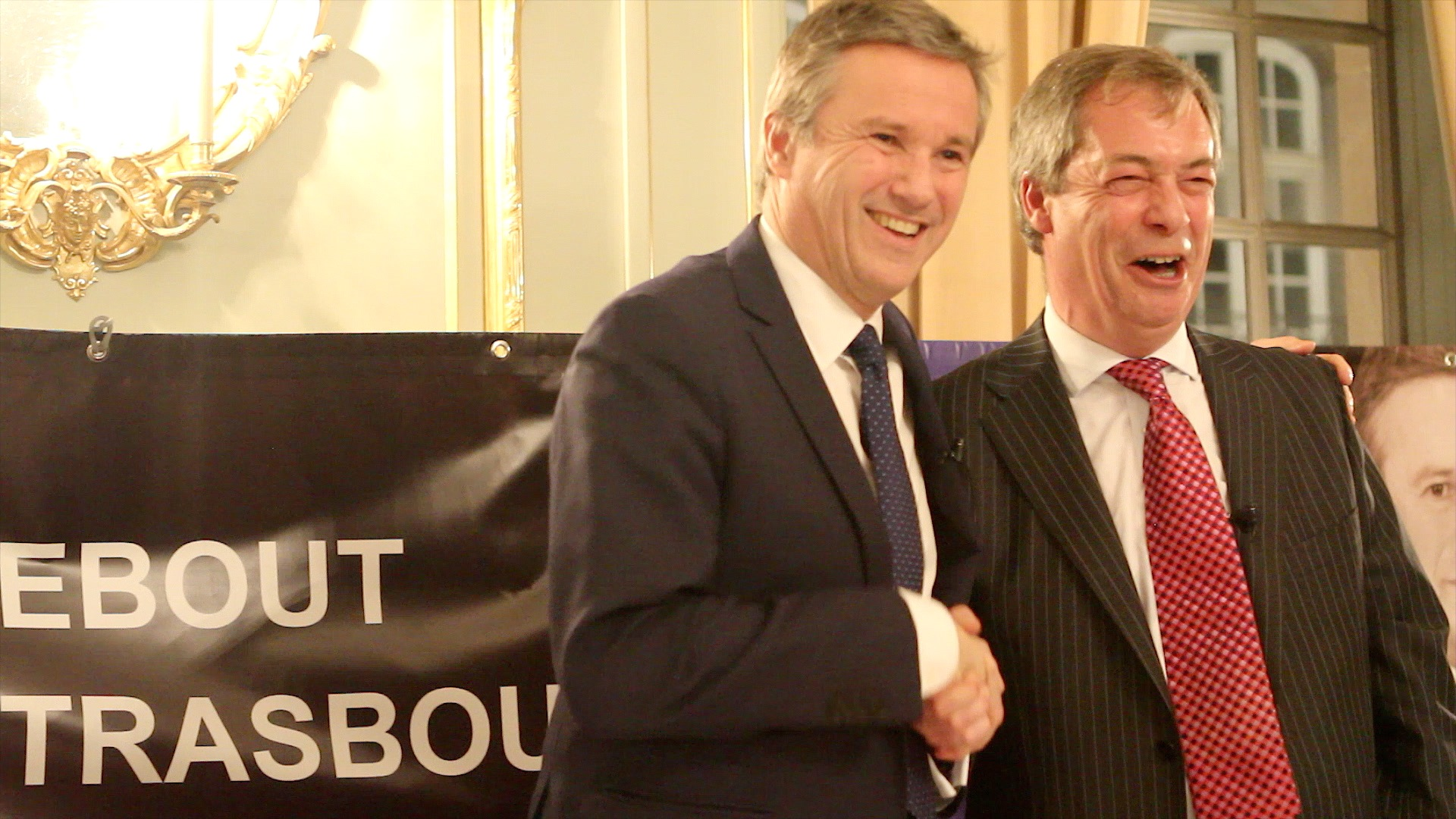
Farage with France Arise leader Nicolas Dupont-Aignan in Strasbourg, February 2013

Following the 2004 European parliament election, 37 MEPs from the UK, Poland, Denmark and Sweden founded a new European Parliamentary group called Independence and Democracy as a direct successor to the EDD group. After the 2009 European parliament election, UKIP was a founder member of a new right-wing grouping called Europe of Freedom and Democracy (EFD) comprising Eurosceptic, radical right, nationalist, national-conservative and other political factions. This group was more right-wing than the previous term's Independence and Democracy group.

Following the 2014 European parliament election, the EFD group was reconstituted as the Europe of Freedom and Direct Democracy (EFDD or EFD^{2}) group on 24 June 2014, with a significant changes to group composition, including the Five Star Movement of Italy, a total of 48 members. The EFDD group lost official status in October 2014 when the defection of the Latvian MEP Iveta Grigule meant its membership no longer met the required number of states for Parliamentary groups (at least seven different member states). On 20 October, the EFDD announced it had restored the requisite seven state diversity by recruiting Robert Iwaszkiewicz, one of four representatives of the far-right Polish party Congress of the New Right. In December 2014 UKIP co-founded the Alliance for Direct Democracy in Europe, a European political party whose membership is composed of several member parties of the EFDD parliamentary group.

In the 2009–14 parliament, UKIP ranked 76th out of 76 for attendance, took part in 61% of votes, and had three of the six lowest attending MEPs, which led to criticism from other parties and ex-UKIP MEPs that low participation may damage British interests. Between July 2014 and May 2015, its 23 MEPs maintained their record as the least active, participating on average in only 62.29% of votes. In response to criticism of low participation by UKIP MEPs in the EU Parliament, Farage has said that "Our objective as MEPs is not to keep voting endlessly for more EU legislation and to take power away from Westminster."

==== Members of the European Parliament ====
UKIP had no members in the European Parliament following the 2019 EU election. Twenty-four UKIP representatives were elected in the 2014 election, but twenty subsequently defected, one was expelled and three lost their seats in the 2019 election. For a full list of defections see here.

James Carver left UKIP to sit as an independent on 28 May 2018. William Dartmouth left the party on 26 September 2018 to sit as an independent, accusing Batten of "hijacking the party to campaign against Islam as a religion" and associating himself with "outlandish people and extreme right-wing groups". Bill Etheridge followed shortly afterwards, on 2 October 2018, saying that the party under Batten's leadership "is seen by voters as a vehicle of hate towards Muslims and the gay community".

In November 2018, Patrick O'Flynn resigned to join the Social Democratic Party in protest over UKIP's move to the "hard right", and Louise Bours became an independent MEP. Former leader Nigel Farage quit on 6 December 2018, as did Scottish MEP David Coburn. Another former leader, Paul Nuttall, quit the party the following day, as did London Assembly Member Peter Whittle. It was reported that Tim Aker had also quietly quit the party earlier in 2018. Julia Reid announced her resignation from UKIP on 8 December 2018, with Jonathan Bullock following the next day. Jill Seymour, Jane Collins and Margot Parker left for the Brexit Party on 15 April 2019, with the first of those three citing the party's current direction and occupation of 'the extreme right of politics' and the second citing Batten's 'sick' defence of Carl Benjamin's rape comments. On 17 April, Jonathan Arnott and Ray Finch both defected to The Brexit Party and, along with Seymour, Collins and Parker, sat in the EFDD group.

As of April 2019, Batten and Agnew were members of the Europe of Nations and Freedom group in the European Parliament while Hookem was Non-Inscrit (unattached). All lost their seats in the European Parliament in June 2019.

== Election results ==
=== European Parliament elections ===
Election year	Leader	# of total votes	% of overall vote	# of seats won	Outcome
1994	Alan Sked	150,251 #8th ▲	1.0% ▲	0 / 87	No seats
1999	Jeffrey Titford	696,057 #4th ▲	6.5% ▲	3 / 87	Opposition
2004	Roger Knapman	2,650,768 #3rd ▲	15.6% ▲	12 / 87	Opposition
2009	Nigel Farage	2,498,226 #2nd ▲	16% ▲	13 / 87	Opposition
2014	Nigel Farage	4,352,251 #1st ▲	27.5% ▲	24 / 87 ▲	Opposition
2019	Gerard Batten	554,463 #8th ▼	3.2% ▼	0 / 87 ▼	No seats

=== General elections ===
During the 2010–15 Parliament, two Conservative MPs defected to UKIP and were re-elected in subsequent by-elections. At the 2015 general election, UKIP retained one of these seats (Clacton) and received over 30% of the vote in Boston and Skegness, South Thanet, Heywood and Middleton, Thurrock and Rochester and Strood. It lost its only seat in the 2017 election, when Clacton was regained by the Conservatives.

Election year	Leader	# of total votes	% of overall vote	# of seats won	Outcome
1997	Alan Sked	105,722 ▲	0.3% ▲	0 / 659	No seats
2001	Jeffrey Titford	390,563 ▲	1.5% ▲	0 / 659	No seats
2005	Roger Knapman	603,298 ▲	2.2% ▲	0 / 646	No seats
2010	Lord Pearson	919,546 ▲	3.1% ▲	0 / 650	No seats
2015	Nigel Farage	3,881,099 ▲	12.6% ▲	1 / 650 ▲	Opposition
2017	Paul Nuttall	593,852 ▼	1.8% ▼	0 / 650 ▼	No seats
2019	Patricia Mountain (interim leader)	22,817 ▼	0.1% ▼	0 / 650	No seats
2024	Nick Tenconi (interim leader)	6,530 ▼	0.01% ▼	0 / 650	No seats

== Reception ==
=== Other political groups ===
In campaigning on emotive issues, UKIP has proved divisive. Popular stereotypes have framed it as a far-right party, and portrayed its activists as old white men holding offensive views. The party has faced vocal opposition from anti-fascist groups such as Hope not Hate, who have accused it of tapping into nationalist and xenophobic sentiment in its campaigns. Writing for The New York Times Magazine, Geoffrey Wheatcroft noted that there had been "a concerted campaign to brand UKIP as racist, an accusation that some of its own activists have done nothing to discourage." Goodwin and Caitlin Milazzo highlighted that Farage had been "routinely ridiculed and dismissed", at best being portrayed as "a beer-swilling populist who wanted to drag Britain back to the 1950s" while at worst depicted as "a racist... would-be demagogue" who secretly wanted to overthrow the UK's liberal parliamentary democracy.

For many years, mainstream political figures derided or demeaned the importance of UKIP, although this did little to obstruct its electoral advances. By 2014, at which point UKIP was securing significant electoral support in the European Parliamentary elections, the main parties began to take it more seriously and devoted more time to countering the electoral threat it posed to them, in turn drawing more journalistic attention to the party. This increased attention gave the party the "oxygen of publicity" which helped bring the party to the attention of previously inattentive voters. Many on Britain's centre-left have been reluctant to accept that UKIP was hindering public support for Labour, instead believing that they were primarily a problem for the Conservatives and would thus help produce a Labour victory. Labour found that their campaign strategy of accusing UKIP of racism backfired, as rather than distancing UKIP supporters from the party it contributed to the perception that Labour failed to understand widespread concerns regarding immigration. A December 2014 poll by ComRes found that voters saw UKIP as closer to the centre-ground of politics than the Conservatives.

The British National Party blamed UKIP for its decline, accusing the latter of stealing BNP policies and slogans.

=== Media and academia ===
The British press have publicised statements made by UKIP activists and candidates which have been regarded as racist, sexist or otherwise bigoted. Among the examples of UKIP representatives and supporters embarrassing the party have been an MEP who called for a ban on the construction of mosques and for all British Muslims to sign a code of conduct, a councillor who suggested that shops should be allowed to refuse service to women and homosexuals, and a council candidate who compared Islam to Nazism and told black comedian Lenny Henry to leave Britain after the latter called for greater ethnic diversity within the UK's creative industries. In 2015, a documentary called Meet the Ukippers filmed activists making racist statements; one said "the only people I do have a problem with are negroes". For many years such individuals were internally tolerated within the party, although as part of Farage's push to professionalise the party a number of its members, such as MEP Godfrey Bloom, were expelled for making comments that brought UKIP into disrepute. In 2018, Jo Marney—who was then the girlfriend of the party leader Henry Bolton—was suspended from UKIP after it was revealed that she had sent texts stating that black Africans were "ugly". In these messages, she had criticised Meghan Markle for marrying into the British royal family, stating that Markle was "a dumb little commoner" and "a black American. Pushing their way to the top slowly. Next will be a Muslim PM and a black king."

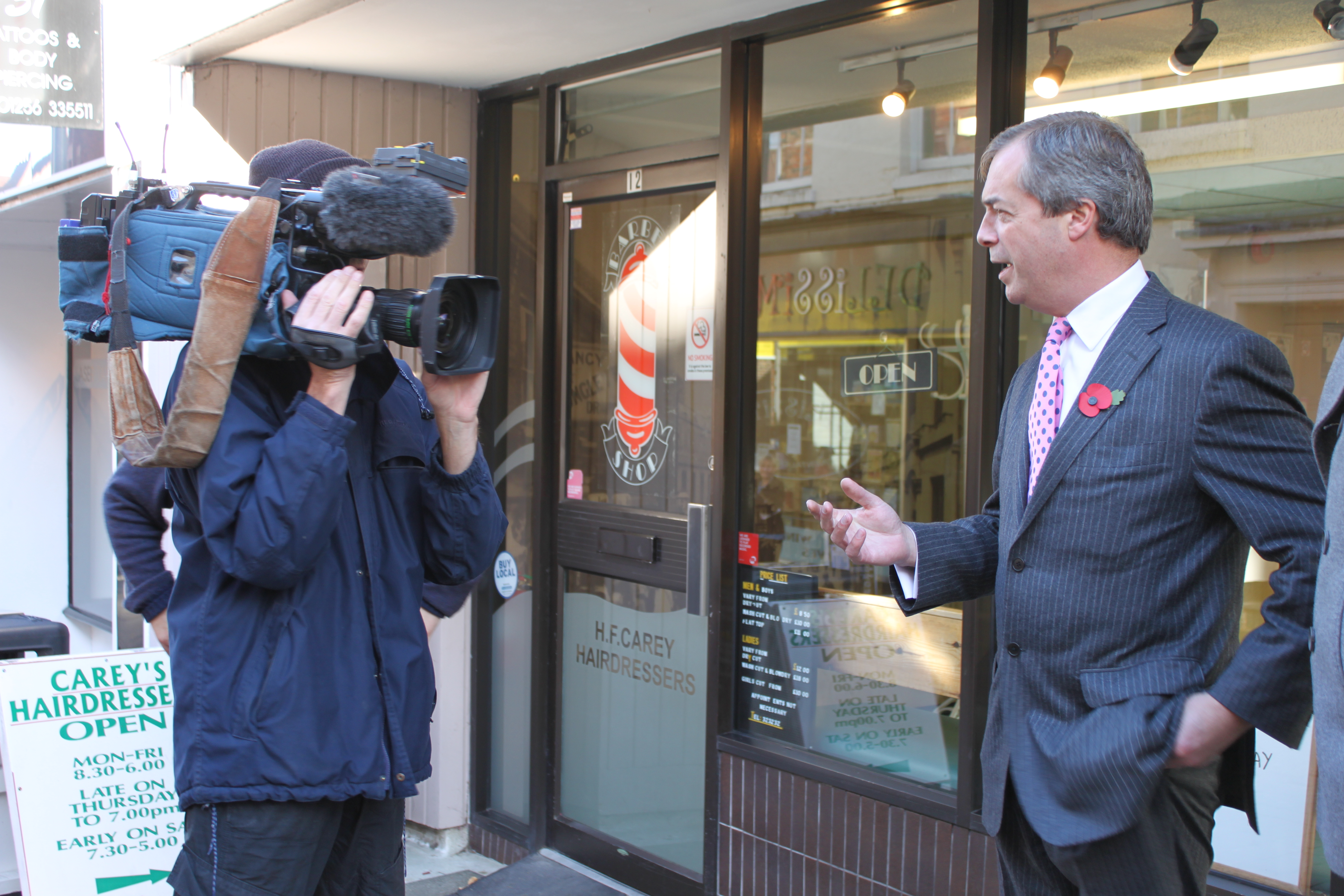
Farage talking to the media in 2012

In a May 2014 YouGov survey, 47% considered the media to be biased against UKIP, which was double the percentage who deemed the media biased against any other party. The BBC received almost 1,200 complaints about its coverage of the 2014 European and local elections; 149 claimed that the BBC were biased against UKIP, while the rest claimed that it gave disproportionate attention to the party. The BBC defended its coverage. Farage accused the BBC of a "liberal bias", particularly on issues of immigration, the EU, and climate change.

David Deacon and Dominic Wring's examination of press coverage of UKIP during their 2014 campaign demonstrated that of the elite newspapers, the pro-EU titles The Guardian and The Observer gave the most coverage to perceived racist and intolerant aspects of the party, while the Eurosceptic titles The Times and The Sunday Times instead focused on questioning the propriety and integrity of UKIP representatives. Among the populist tabloids, The Sun/Sun on Sunday and the Daily Mirror/Sunday Mirror were found to contain the most negative coverage of UKIP, while the Daily Express and Sunday Express—owned by UKIP donor Richard Desmond—gave significantly lower coverage to the gaffes and prejudices of UKIP representatives. Deacon and Wring noted that the majority of those right-wing newspapers that share UKIP's views on immigration also share the perspective of more liberal newspapers that many of UKIP's interventions are racist. This right-wing press opposition to UKIP may result from the allegiance that these newspapers have to the Conservatives, and resulting perception of UKIP as an electoral threat.

Academic research has been carried out into UKIP. In 2016, it was noted that most of this had focused on examining the party's electoral support base, its consequences for other parties, and the possibilities and prospects of a referendum on continued EU membership, with little having focused on an examination of the party's policies. Two currents have emerged among those seeking to interpret UKIP: the first, and generally older, current views them as a manifestation of Britain's strong Eurosceptic movement, while the second seeks to explain their position in the British parliamentary system while drawing upon the comparative literature on right-wing populist parties elsewhere in Europe.

== See also ==
- Euroscepticism in the United Kingdom
- Russian interference in the 2016 Brexit referendum
- 2010s in United Kingdom political history
- Personalist party
