= Nick Tenconi =

British politician and activist

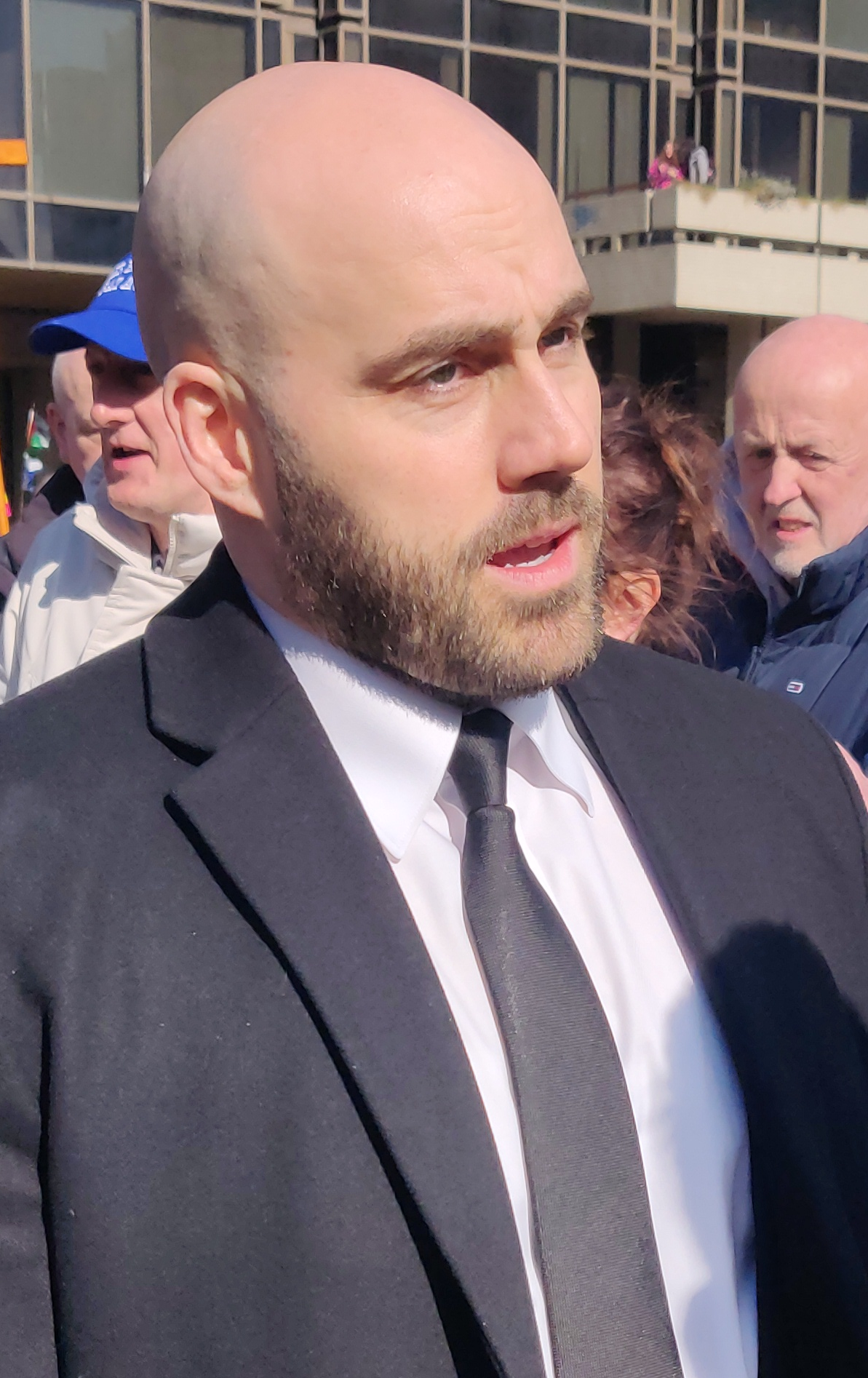
- Tenconi in 2025

Leader of the UK Independence Party
- Incumbent
- Assumed office 5 February 2025; Interim: 16 June 2024 – 5 February 2025
- Honorary president: Neil Hamilton
- Preceded by: Lois Perry

Deputy Leader of the UK Independence Party
- In office May 2024 – 16 June 2024
- Leader: Lois Perry
- Preceded by: Rebecca Jane
- Succeeded by: Vacant

Personal details
- Party: UK Independence Party (Since 2024)
- Other political affiliations: Turning Point UK (Since 2021)

Nick Tenconi is a British politician, personal trainer and political activist who has been the leader of the UK Independence Party (UKIP) since February 2025, having served as acting leader from June 2024. He is also the chief operating officer of the right-wing pressure group Turning Point UK (TPUK).

== Biography ==
Tenconi was born into a wealthy family from Eastbourne, East Sussex. He went to a private junior school, followed by a state secondary school. He went on to work in sales, then launched his own personal training business, Tenco Training, in 2013 in Reading. In 2023, Tenconi received publicity after driving to Ukraine to deliver aid.

His political career began when he joined the right-wing group Turning Point UK, eventually becoming Chief operating officer (COO). As the COO of Turning Point UK, in 2023 he was involved in organising street demonstrations in Honor Oak, Lewisham at a pub which had held drag queen storytime events. The repeated protests by TPUK saw hundreds of counter protesters outnumbering and drowning out TPUK's activists. According to Trans Safety Network, Tenconi "was enthusiastically involved in the street violence, personally offering to fight individuals, and physically moving towards and grabbing at counter-protesters". The LGBT news website Pink News wrote that Tenconi "uses his Twitter platform to espouse hateful anti-trans views".

A feature on the radical right published by Hope not Hate said of Turning Point UK that "following the addition of COO Nick Tenconi to the group, it appears to be in the process of reinventing itself as a street-protest organiser, taking a key role in the demonstrations against drag queen storytelling sessions throughout the year".

=== UKIP ===
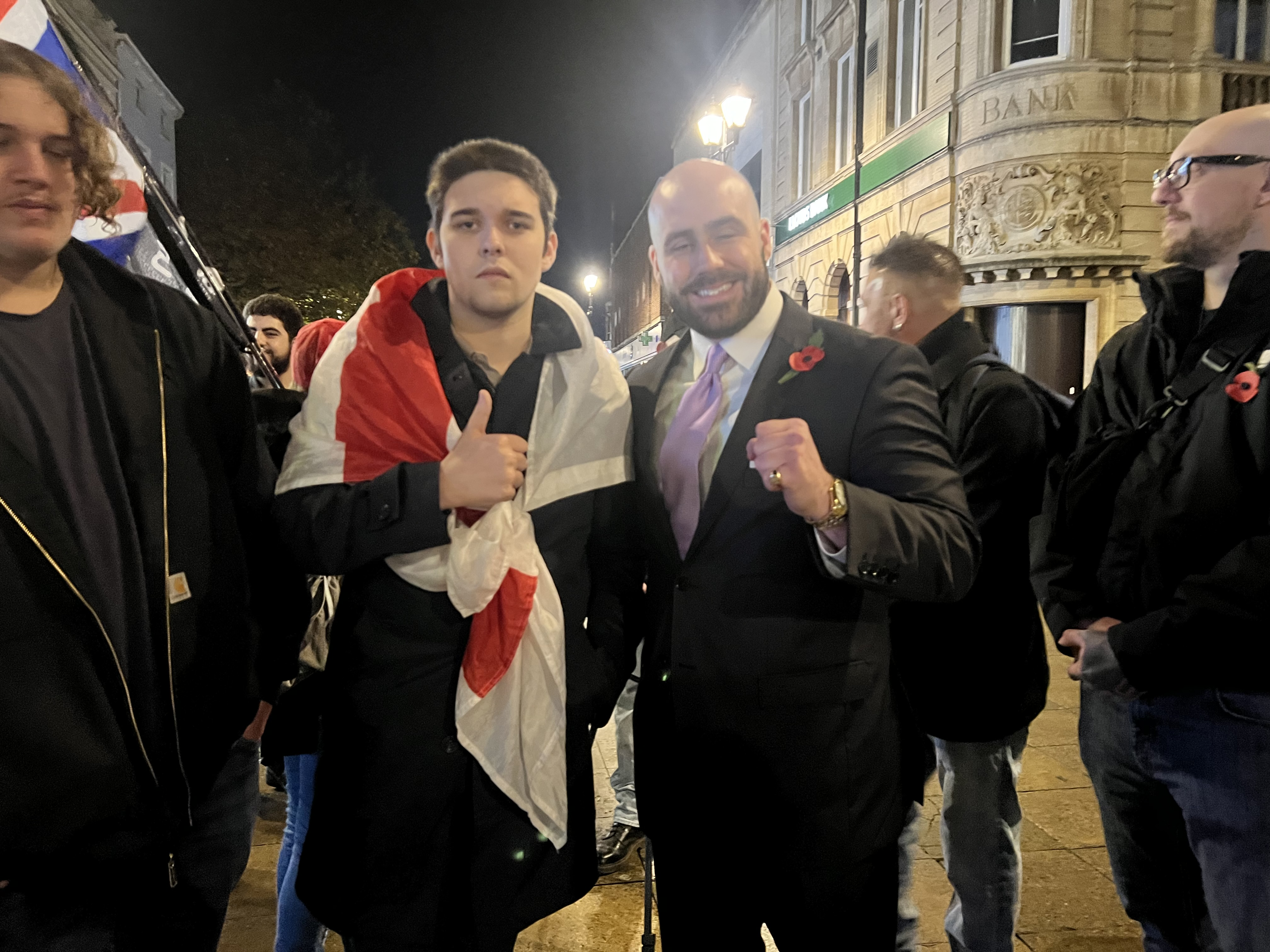
Nick Tenconi in Lincoln, UK

Tenconi was elected as deputy leader of UKIP in May 2024, after having only recently joined, and later took on the role as acting leader after Lois Perry quit and endorsed Reform UK during the July 2024 general election. According to Searchlight, Perry later said that she quit because "there was something 'sinister' going on, which she had not foreseen, certain elements in the leadership, whom she did not name, 'wanted to go after quite an extreme viewpoint'". However, she said that Tenconi was not part of this extremist tendency.

According to Searchlight, after Tenconi took leadership of UKIP, he attempted to move closer to controversial activist Tommy Robinson, appointed anti-Islam activist and preacher Calvin Robinson as its lead spokesperson, and entered into talks with anti-Muslim influencer Katie Hopkins.

Tenconi was at a protest in London on 1 August 2024 which turned violent. He was seen with a loudspeaker at anti-migrant protests in Plymouth in August 2024, and at other anti-migrant protests in Aldershot and Reading leading chants of 'invaders out'. According to Searchlight, Tenconi alleged that a man who killed three young girls in Southport, which sparked the anti-migrant riots, was "under orders".

On 5 February 2025, UKIP announced that Tenconi had been ratified as party leader. Since becoming leader, Tenconi has made Christian identity politics an important part of UKIP's campaign.

On 8 August 2025, Tenconi published a video depicting himself in attendance of an anti-migrant demonstration in Portsmouth. In this video, he is seen performing a gesture that some, including Hope not Hate, have compared to a Nazi salute. The gesture was made while dancing to the 1999 Italian song L'amour toujours, which in 2024 was banned from being played at Munich's Oktoberfest by the organisers after it became an anthem of the German far-right. Both Tenconi and Turning Point UK denied the accusations, stating they were a "ridiculous smear," with Tenconi reiterating that "[the] ideology at UKIP is conservatism," with the party standing "wholeheartedly against the far-right and Nazism".

== Views ==
Tenconi has described himself as a "defender of masculinity, Christianity, and conservative values" and has expressed his opposition to what he describes as "satanic woke culture". Based on this, some people have described him and UKIP as Christian nationalist. He describes himself as a "huge fan" of Kyle Rittenhouse, a young American who was acquitted of murder after he shot and killed two people at a Black Lives Matter protest. Tenconi has said that liberalism "breeds degeneracy", and that British people should "return" to traditional values. He has also been outspoken about what he perceives as an immigration "problem" in Britain, and said that British people need to "outbreed the invaders".

Parliament of the United Kingdom
Preceded by Lois Perry	Leader of the UK Independence Party; Acting; 2024–present	Incumbent
