= Lois Perry =

British politician

Leader of the UK Independence Party
- In office 13 May 2024 – 15 June 2024
- Deputy: Nick Tenconi
- Honorary president: Neil Hamilton
- Preceded by: Neil Hamilton
- Succeeded by: Nick Tenconi

Personal details
- Born: June 1981 (age 45) Leigh-on-Sea, Essex, England
- Party: Reform UK; UK Independence Party (2024)
- Other political affiliations: Reclaim Party (before 2024)

Lois Jasmine Perry (born June 1981) is a British politician, broadcaster and activist who was leader of the UK Independence Party (UKIP) from May to June 2024.

== Background ==
Perry was married to Richard Hillgrove until 2016. He is a public relations executive with whom she founded the PR agency 6 Hillgrove. She was an associate at the company until 2021.

Perry founded Car26 in 2021, an anti-net zero group, in response to the Cop26 summit.

=== Political career ===
Perry was previously a member of Laurence Fox's Reclaim Party, serving as their South East spokesperson. In this role, she called for stop and searches of youths deemed to be suspicious in the Southend area, following a series of antisocial incidents.

==== Leadership of UKIP and 2024 general election ====
In early 2024, Perry declared her candidacy for leader of the UK Independence Party (UKIP), after Neil Hamilton announced his retirement. She won the subsequent leadership contest, beating rival Bill Etheridge, with 77.4% of all votes cast.

Ahead of the 2024 general election, Perry revealed that she would be standing in Harlow. Controversially, she was pictured with Reform UK leader and candidate for Clacton Nigel Farage at a lunch event, who she encouraged voters to back, despite UKIP also standing a candidate there. Additionally, she endorsed Reform's Lee Anderson as MP for Ashfield. On 15 June 2024 Perry resigned as leader, in order to spend time recovering from a recent battle with pneumonia, which left her hospitalised. Despite her resignation, she remained a candidate for the general election, due to the nomination deadline having been passed. Perry came last out of all candidates in Harlow, polling only 157 votes (0.4%).

In a subsequent interview on Andre Walker's TalkTV programme, Perry claimed that there was something "sinister" going on in UKIP that led to her resignation, and that members of the party leadership “wanted to go after quite an extreme viewpoint.” She clarified that deputy leader Nick Tenconi “doesn’t represent” the extreme faction in the party, nor did chairman Ben Walker.

==== The Heartland Institute ====
In December 2024, Perry was announced as the executive director of the newly-formed Heartland Institute UK/EU. The Heartland Institute is a US-based organisation which describes itself as "the world's most prominent think tank supporting skepticism about man-made climate change". Nigel Farage, the leader of Reform UK, was a guest speaker at the launch event for Heartland Institute UK/EU.
