= UK Independence Party leadership election =

UK Independence Party leadership election may refer to:

- 2002 UK Independence Party leadership election
- 2006 UK Independence Party leadership election
- 2009 UK Independence Party leadership election
- 2010 UK Independence Party leadership election
- September 2016 UK Independence Party leadership election
- November 2016 UK Independence Party leadership election
- 2017 UK Independence Party leadership election
- 2018 UK Independence Party leadership election
- 2018 UKIP Wales leadership election
- 2019 UK Independence Party leadership election
- 2020 UK Independence Party leadership election
- 2021 UK Independence Party leadership election
