= 2019 in United Kingdom politics and government =

== Events ==
=== January ===
- 7 January – A 10-year plan for NHS England is unveiled. As a result of Barnett consequentials, a proportionate share of extra funding will be transferred to the Scottish Parliament, Welsh Assembly and Northern Ireland Executive.
- 8 January – MPs back an amendment to the Finance Bill, by 303 to 296 votes, to limit the Treasury's powers in a no-deal Brexit scenario.
- 9 January – MPs back Dominic Grieve's amendment to the EU withdrawal agreement, by 308 to 297 votes, compelling the government to return to Parliament within three days if the deal is voted down the following week.
- 14 January – Conservative Party whip Gareth Johnson resigns, saying he cannot support the government in the forthcoming vote on Theresa May's Brexit withdrawal agreement.
- 15 January – The House of Commons rejects Theresa May's deal on the UK's withdrawal from the European Union by 432 votes to 202. The 230 vote margin is the largest defeat for a government motion in 100 years.
- 16 January – Theresa May's government survives a no confidence vote by 325 to 306.
- 17 January – Prince Philip the then Duke of Edinburgh crashes his car near Sandringham. It goes upside down. The Prince and another person are injured.

=== February ===
- 13 February – At the Warsaw Summit, Jeremy Hunt seeks international support for a cease-fire in Yemen.

=== March ===
- 1 March – The UK Government announces it has paid out £33,000,000 to settle a dispute with Eurotunnel over the awarding of ferry contracts, which was led by Transport Secretary Chris Grayling, to cope with a no-deal Brexit.
- 12 March – The House of Commons rejects Theresa May's deal on the UK's withdrawal from the European Union for a second time, by 391 votes to 242.
- 13 March – MPs vote by 321 votes to 278 to accept an amended government motion to reject the UK leaving the European Union without a deal.
- 14 March – MPs vote by 412 to 202 in favour of requesting that the UK's withdrawal from the European Union be delayed beyond 29 March.
- 18 March – The Speaker, John Bercow, quoting a parliamentary rule dating back to 1604, declares that a third "meaningful vote" on the Brexit deal cannot proceed unless it contains substantial changes. Ministers warn of a "constitutional crisis", with just eleven days until the UK is due to leave the EU.
- 20 March – Prime Minister Theresa May writes a letter to EU Council President Donald Tusk, requesting a three-month extension to Article 50.
- 21 March – The EU agrees to delay Brexit until 22 May 2019, if MPs approve a withdrawal deal; or to 12 April if they do not.
- 25 March – MPs defeat the government by 329 to 302 as they vote in favour of an amendment by Oliver Letwin, giving Parliament the option to hold a series of "indicative votes" on Brexit.
- 26 March – The European Parliament votes by 348 to 278 in favour of the controversial Article 13 of the European Union Directive on Copyright in the Digital Single Market, which expands legal liability for websites.
- 27 March –
  - MPs back the statutory instrument changing the Brexit date in the EU Withdrawal Act by 441 votes to 105, a majority of 336.
  - None of MPs' eight proposed options (indicative votes) for Brexit gains a majority following a House of Commons vote.
- 29 March
  - The recently formed Independent Group applies to become a political party with the name "Change UK – The Independent Group" and names Heidi Allen as interim leader.
  - MPs reject Theresa May's EU withdrawal agreement for a third time, by 344 votes to 286.
  - A motion of no confidence against pro-EU Conservative MP Dominic Grieve is carried by his local party, 182 votes to 131.

=== April ===
- 1 April
  - London Liverpool Street, London King's Cross and Edinburgh Waverley become the last of Network Rail's stations to abolish charges to their public toilets.
  - For the second time, none of four proposed options (indicative votes) for Brexit gain a majority following a House of Commons vote. A customs union with the EU, a "Common Market 2.0", a second referendum and a vote on whether to revoke Article 50 all fail to win clear backing from MPs.
  - Immediately following the indicative votes on Brexit, MP Nick Boles quits the Conservative party, with a speech criticising his former colleagues for refusing to compromise on the options.
- 2 April – In a statement following a Cabinet meeting, Prime Minister Theresa May announces her intention to extend Article 50 again and work with Opposition Leader Jeremy Corbyn on a plan, but keep the withdrawal agreement as part of her deal.
- 3 April – A bill by Labour MP Yvette Cooper to force the Prime Minister to ask the EU for an extension to Article 50, in order to avoid a no-deal Brexit, passes the House of Commons by 313 votes to 312.
- 5 April – Theresa May writes to the EU requesting a Brexit extension until 30 June 2019. EU ministers respond by saying the letter is too vague to justify an extension being offered.
- 10 April – The UK and the EU agree an Article 50 extension to 31 October 2019. No reopening of the withdrawal agreement negotiations is allowed and the UK "must hold the elections to the European Parliament" on 23 May, or it will be forced to leave on 1 June 2019.
- 12 April – Former UKIP leader Nigel Farage launches the Brexit Party.
- 22 April – Leaders from 70 local Conservative Associations sign a petition calling for a vote of no confidence in Theresa May. The non-binding vote, to be determined by 800 of the party's senior officials, would be the first time such an instance has occurred.
- 24 April – The Conservative Party's 1922 Committee votes against changing the party's rules regarding leadership challenges, but asks for clarity on when Prime Minister Theresa May will step down from office.
- 26 April – Prime Minister Theresa May and Irish Taoiseach Leo Varadkar issue a joint statement setting out a new process of talks designed to restore devolution to Northern Ireland, to begin on 7 May.

=== May ===
- 1 May –
  - Peterborough Member of Parliament Fiona Onasanya becomes the first MP to be removed by a recall petition after 19,261 of her constituents voted for her to be removed from office. Onasanya's recall petition had been automatically triggered as a result of her conviction for perverting the course of justice, an offence for which she was imprisoned in January.
  - Defence Secretary Gavin Williamson is sacked, after a leak from a National Security Council meeting, in which plans by Chinese firm Huawei to contribute to the UK's 5G network were discussed. He is replaced by Penny Mordaunt.
- 2 May – 2019 United Kingdom local elections: The Lib Dems, Greens and independents make gains in the local elections at the expense of the Conservatives, while Labour and UKIP also suffer losses.
- 16 May
  - Boris Johnson confirms that he will run for the Conservative Party leadership after Theresa May stands down.
  - Brexit talks between Labour and the Conservatives end without agreement, following six weeks of cross-party debate, with Jeremy Corbyn saying negotiations have "gone as far as they can."
  - The Ministry of Justice announces plans to introduce "Helen's Law", which would require a person convicted of murder without the presence of a body to reveal the location of their victim's remains before being considered for parole.
- 22 May – Andrea Leadsom resigns as Leader of the House of Commons, saying she no longer believes the government's approach will deliver Brexit. She is replaced the following day by Mel Stride.
- 23 May – Elections to the European Parliament are held.
- 24 May – Prime Minister Theresa May announces her resignation as Conservative Party leader, effective 7 June.
- 28 May
  - Alastair Campbell, the former communications chief to Tony Blair, is expelled from the Labour Party, after publicly stating that he voted for the Liberal Democrats during the European Parliamentary elections.
  - The Speaker, John Bercow announces that he plans to possibly stay on as Speaker of the House until 2022, saying it is not "sensible to vacate the chair" while there are major issues before parliament.

=== June ===
- 3 June – U.S. President Donald Trump begins a three-day state visit to the UK.
- 4 June – Six Change UK MPs – Luciana Berger, Gavin Shuker, Angela Smith, Chuka Umunna, Sarah Wollaston and interim party leader Heidi Allen – announce their resignation from the party. The remaining five MPs, remain in the party, with Brexit and Justice spokeswoman Anna Soubry becoming leader.
- 6 June – Peterborough by election: Labour retains the seat, with the Brexit Party finishing in second place and the Conservatives in third. The by-election was held because of the previous Labour MP having been removed as the result of a recall petition.
- 7 June – Prime Minister Theresa May resigns as Leader of the Conservative Party, paving the way for a leadership contest.
- 12 June
  - Theresa May announces a new legally binding target to reach net zero greenhouse gas emissions by 2050, making the United Kingdom the first major industrialised nation to propose this goal.
  - In a vote of 309–298, MPs reject a plan by Labour to take control of Parliament's timetable, which would have enabled the tabling of legislation to prevent a no-deal Brexit on 31 October.
- 13 June – Former Labour MP, then-Change UK MP, then Independent MP, Chuka Umunna, defects to the Liberal Democrats.
- 21 June
  - Conservative Party MP Chris Davies loses his seat after a recall petition in response to his conviction for submitting false expenses claims. This forces a by-election in Brecon and Radnorshire.
  - Conservative Party MP Mark Field is suspended as a Minister, after video footage shows him grabbing and pushing a female activist who interrupted Chancellor of the Exchequer Philip Hammond's Mansion House Speech.

=== July ===
- 5 July – Secretary of State for Justice David Gauke confirms that "Helen's Law" will be adopted in England and Wales.
- 7 July – The Trump administration is labelled "inept", "insecure" and "incompetent" in leaked emails from the British Ambassador to the United States, Sir Kim Darroch.
- 9 July – MPs vote by 294 to 293 in favour of a bid to require ministers to give fortnightly updates on the situation in Northern Ireland. The plan, drawn up by Dominic Grieve, is designed to make it harder for the next prime minister to suspend Parliament and cause a no-deal Brexit.
- 10 July – Sir Kim Darroch resigns as UK ambassador to the US, amid the ongoing row over leaked emails critical of the Trump administration.
- 18 July – MPs vote again in favour of amendments to stop the next prime minister proroguing Parliament in the autumn to facilitate a no-deal Brexit.
- 22 July
  - Conservative MP for Dover, Charlie Elphicke, is charged with three counts of sexual assault against two women.
  - Jo Swinson is elected by party members as the new leader of the Liberal Democrats, succeeding Sir Vince Cable. She becomes both the first woman to lead the party and its youngest ever leader at age 39.
- 23 July – Boris Johnson is chosen as the new Conservative Party leader in a ballot of party members, beating Jeremy Hunt by 92,153 votes to 46,656.
- 24 July – Theresa May formally tenders her resignation as Prime Minister to the Queen and is succeeded by Boris Johnson.
- 28 July – Boris Johnson subsequently begins to form his cabinet, with Sajid Javid appointed as Chancellor of the Exchequer, Priti Patel as Home Secretary, and Dominic Raab as Foreign Secretary and First Secretary of State.

=== August ===
- 1 August
  - The government announces an extra £2.1bn of funding to prepare for a no-deal Brexit, doubling the amount of money it has set aside for 2019, taking the total since June 2016 to £6.3bn.
  - Liberal Democrat MP Jane Dodds wins the 2019 Brecon and Radnorshire by-election, beating the incumbent Conservative Chris Davies and leaving the Tories with a Commons working majority of just one.
- 10 August – Richard Braine is elected as leader of the UK Independence Party, succeeding Gerard Batten.
- 15 August – Former Conservative and Change UK MP Sarah Wollaston joins the Liberal Democrats, saying it is the best way for her to fight to keep Britain in the European Union.
- 18 July – More than 100 MPs write to Prime Minister Boris Johnson calling for a recall of Parliament to debate concerns that the UK faces "a national emergency" over Brexit.
- 22 August – Boris Johnson meets French president Emmanuel Macron in Paris, insisting that the Brexit impasse can be broken "with energy and creativity". Macron reiterates that the Republic of Ireland–Northern Ireland backstop plan is "indispensable" to preserving political stability and the single market.
- 23 August – Boris Johnson and Jeremy Corbyn express concern over major fires in the Amazon rainforest, ahead of the latest G7 summit. A spokesperson for the Department for International Trade states: "The UK remains committed to protecting the world’s rainforests and will continue to do so in Brazil through our international climate finance programmes."
- 27 August – Opposition MPs gather in Church House, Westminster, where they agree to form "an alternative parliament" if Boris Johnson attempts to force a no-deal Brexit by prorogation. They sign a declaration, calling this threat "an undemocratic outrage at such a crucial moment for our country, and a historic constitutional crisis". Downing Street accuses the MPs of trying to sabotage negotiations with the EU.
- 28 August – Boris Johnson asks the Queen to suspend Parliament from early September until 14 October. Following precedent, she approves the request. While many Brexit supporters welcome the move, the action receives widespread condemnation from those in favour of the UK remaining in the EU, triggering protests both in London and around the country.
- 29 August – Ruth Davidson resigns as leader of the Scottish Conservatives.
- 31 August – Demonstrations are held across the UK in protest at Boris Johnson's decision to suspend parliament.

=== September ===
- 2 September – In a speech outside 10 Downing Street, Boris Johnson states his opposition to calling a general election and urges MPs not to vote for "another pointless delay" to Brexit.
- 3 September
  - The government loses its majority in the House of Commons after Conservative MP Phillip Lee crosses the floor to join the Liberal Democrats.
  - MPs opposed to a No-deal Brexit take control of House of Commons business by 328 votes to 301. Johnson responds by telling MPs he will now push for an October general election.
  - Boris Johnson withdraws the whip from 21 Conservative MPs who voted against the government, including several former Cabinet Ministers. Notable among them are Father of The House, Ken Clarke, who had served as an MP since the 1970 general election, and Sir Nicholas Soames, grandson of former UK Prime Minister Winston Churchill.
- 4 September
  - A bill intended to block the possibility of the UK leaving the EU without a deal passes its first Commons vote by 329 to 300.
  - A Scottish judge rejects a call by 75 parliamentarians to have the government's postponement of parliament declared illegal. The judge rules that it is for politicians and voters to judge, and not the courts.
  - MPs reject Boris Johnson's motion to call a snap general election for October, failing to achieve the two-thirds Commons majority needed under the Fixed-term Parliaments Act, in a vote of 298 to 56. Labour MPs abstain from the vote.
- 5 September
  - Former Labour and Change UK MP Luciana Berger joins the Liberal Democrats.
  - Jo Johnson, brother of Boris Johnson, resigns as an MP and minister, stating he is "torn between family and national interest".
- 6 September
  - The bill designed to prevent a no deal Brexit is passed by the House of Lords.
  - Opposition parties agree not to back any further government calls for a general election in mid-October.
  - The High Court rejects a case brought by anti-Brexit campaigner Gina Miller over the suspension of parliament, ruling that it is lawful.
- 7 September
  - Work and Pensions Secretary Amber Rudd resigns from the Cabinet and surrenders the Conservative Party whip, saying she cannot "stand by" while "loyal moderate Conservatives are expelled".
  - Former Labour and Change UK MP Angela Smith joins the Liberal Democrats.
- 9 September
  - John Bercow announces that he will stand down as Speaker of the House of Commons on 31 October, or at the next general election, depending on which comes first.
  - The Benn bill, intended to stop Britain leaving the EU without a deal, is granted royal assent.
  - By a vote of 311 to 302, MPs back a motion calling for the publication of all government communications relating to no-deal Brexit planning and the suspension of Parliament.
  - A second government motion calling for an early general election fails to achieve the required super-majority, with 293 MPs voting in favour of it.
- 10 September – Parliament is prorogued amid unprecedented protests in the House of Commons from opposition MPs, with some holding up signs saying "silenced".
- 11 September
  - Three judges at Scotland's highest civil court rule that the government's prorogation of the UK Parliament is unlawful "and is thus null and of no effect." The UK's Supreme Court in London is to hear the government's appeal against the ruling next week.
  - Around 40 MPs return to work in Parliament, in protest at its suspension and to show their support for the Scottish ruling that the government's decision to prorogue is illegal.
  - In response to a motion passed by MPs on 9 September to force its release, the government publish a five-page document covering the no-deal contingency plan, Operation Yellowhammer. Ministers block the publication of personal communications about Parliament's prorogation, which were also covered by the motion.
  - Downing Street rules out the possibility of an electoral pact between the Conservatives and the Brexit Party.
- 12 September – The High Court in Belfast rejects a legal challenge against a no-deal Brexit that was brought on the argument it breaches the Good Friday Agreement.
- 14 September
  - Ex-Conservative MP Sam Gyimah, one of the 21 rebels who had the whip removed on 3 September, joins the Liberal Democrats.
  - Facebook removes a Conservative Party advertisement saying it "misused" their advertising platform in the way it presented figures from a BBC News story about the amount of money being invested in schools.
- 15 September – At their annual party conference in Bournemouth, members of the Liberal Democrats vote to scrap Brexit without a second referendum if they win the next general election.
- 17 September – The hearing of the prorogation of Parliament appeal begins at the Supreme Court in London, to decide whether the act of suspending Parliament is justiciable and lawful.
- 19 September – The Supreme Court hearing of the prorogation appeal concludes after three days and a decision is expected to be given early in the next week.
- 22 September – An article in the Sunday Times accuses Prime Minister Boris Johnson of misconduct in office while Mayor of London, alleging that US businesswoman Jennifer Arcuri received favourable treatment with the awarding of grants to her company because of her friendship with Johnson.
- 24 September – The 11 justices of the Supreme Court rule unanimously that the prorogation brought forward by Boris Johnson is both justiciable and unlawful, and therefore null and of no effect.
- 25 September – MPs return to Parliament after the ending of prorogation. Amid furious scenes in the Commons, opposition politicians accuse the Prime Minister Boris Johnson of using inflammatory language. Johnson, who described the law seeking to block a no-deal Brexit as "the surrender bill", defends his actions, later saying that "tempers need to come down" in Parliament.
- 26 September – A government motion for a mini-recess the following week for the Conservative Party Conference is lost by 306 votes to 289.
- 27 September – Prime Minister Boris Johnson is referred to the Independent Office for Police Conduct (IOPC) accused of misconduct in office while Mayor of London, an office with responsibility for overseeing policing in London.
- 28 September – Downing Street dismisses Johnson's IOPC referral as 'politically motivated'.
- 29 September
  - The Sunday Times carries fresh allegations about the relationship between Boris Johnson and Jennifer Arcuri, alleging the two were engaged in an affair; Johnson denies any conflict of interest.
  - Downing Street denies an allegation from a female journalist that Johnson squeezed her thigh, and that of another woman, at a lunch in 1999.
- 30 September – Following a meeting of opposition party leaders chaired by Jeremy Corbyn, the Labour leader says he will back a motion of no confidence in Boris Johnson "at a point we can win it and take no-deal off the table".

=== October ===
- 2 October
  - Johnson publishes his Brexit plan, which includes proposals to replace the Irish backstop. It would create an "all-island regulatory zone", meaning that Northern Ireland essentially stays in the European Single Market for agricultural and industrial goods.
  - The government announces fresh plans to prorogue parliament, from 8–14 October to allow them to bring the current parliamentary session to an end and introduce a new Queen's Speech.
- 4 October – The government assures the highest civil court in Scotland that Boris Johnson will send a letter to the EU seeking an extension to Article 50 as required by the Benn Act.
- 5 October – Foreign Secretary Dominic Raab says he has called the US ambassador to the United Kingdom to express his "disappointment" that a US diplomat's wife who is the subject of a police investigation following a fatal road crash has left the UK.
- 8 October
  - A Downing Street source says that a Brexit deal is now "essentially impossible" after a phone call between the Prime Minister and German chancellor Angela Merkel. The Brexit spokesman for Angela Merkel's CDU parliamentary group says the unattributable remark "does not ring true".
  - Parliament is prorogued until 14 October.
- 9 October
  - The Government announces plans for a special Saturday sitting of Parliament for 19 October to discuss Brexit options.
  - Welsh Assembly AMs vote 43–13 to rename the legislature with a bilingual name, calling it both Senedd Cymru and the Welsh Parliament.
- 10 October – Boris Johnson and his Irish counterpart, Taoiseach Leo Varadkar hold talks at Thornton Manor in north west England aimed at reaching an agreement over Northern Ireland's status after Brexit.
- 14 October – The Queen's Speech during Parliament's State Opening sets out 26 bills, including the plans for Brexit.
- 17 October – The UK and EU agree a new Brexit withdrawal agreement, but the DUP confirm they will not support its passage through Parliament.
- 19 October
  - A special Saturday sitting of Parliament is held to debate the revised European Union withdrawal agreement. MPs pass an amendment 322 to 306 that withholds Parliament's approval until legislation implementing the deal has been passed, and forces the Government to request a delay to Brexit until 31 January 2020.
  - 10 Downing Street confirms that Boris Johnson will send a letter to the EU requesting an extension to Article 50, but will not sign it. EU Council President Donald Tusk subsequently confirms receipt of the letter; in addition, Johnson sends a second letter describing any further delay to Brexit as a mistake.
- 21 October – Speaker of the House John Bercow refuses to allow a 'meaningful vote' on the latest Brexit deal, stating that "the motion will not be debated today as it would be repetitive and disorderly to do so."
- 22 October
  - Abortion is decriminalised in Northern Ireland.
  - MPs allow the government's new withdrawal agreement bill to pass to the next stage of the parliamentary process, by 329 votes to 299; a majority of 30. However, the proposed timetable of three days is rejected by 322 votes to 308; a majority of 14.
- 28 October
  - EU leaders agree in principle to move the deadline for a Brexit with an agreement from 31 October 2019 to 31 January 2020.
  - MPs reject a motion for a 12 December general election, with only 299 votes in favour, which is 135 votes short of the two-thirds majority needed. 70 MPs vote against the motion. Johnson says he will table a new bill after losing this motion.
- 29 October
  - Labour leader Jeremy Corbyn announces that he and his party will now support a general election.
  - MPs vote by 438 to 20 in favour of a general election, scheduled for Thursday 12 December 2019, by passing the Early Parliamentary General Election Bill.
- 30 October – The last Prime Minister's Question Time before the general election is held.

=== November ===
- 1 November – Following a report from the Oil and Gas Authority, the government calls a halt to all fracking in the UK "with immediate effect" and warns shale gas companies that it will not support future projects.
- 3 November – Conservative MP Ross Thomson announces he will not stand at the next election following an accusation that he sexually assaulted Labour MP Paul Sweeney.
- 4 November
  - The UK terrorism threat level is reduced from "severe" to "substantial" for the first time since 2014.
  - Sir Lindsay Hoyle, Member of Parliament for Chorley, is elected Speaker of the House, replacing John Bercow who stepped down after 10 years in the role.
  - 18 female members of Parliament of the United Kingdom say they will not seek reelection due to threats and abuse.
- 5 November – Mothercare collapses into administration, putting 2,500 UK jobs at risk.
- 6 November
  - At 00:01, the 57th parliament is dissolved in preparation for the general election on 12 December 2019.
  - Extinction Rebellion wins a High Court challenge against the Metropolitan Police over a London-wide ban on protests that came into force on 14 October.
  - Alun Cairns resigns as Secretary of State for Wales over allegations that he was aware of the role of a former aide in the "sabotage" of a rape trial.
  - Labour's Tom Watson announces he will step down as an MP at the 2019 election, and vacate his post as deputy leader of Labour for personal reasons.
- 7 November – The Times reports that Downing Street is suspected by unnamed sources of suppressing a parliamentary report into Russian interference because it contains "embarrassing" disclosures about the Kremlin links of wealthy Russian donors to the Conservative Party.
- 19 November – Boris Johnson and Jeremy Corbyn appear on ITV in a head-to-head election debate. The Conservatives attract controversy as CCHQ's press office alters the brand and imagery of their Twitter profile (@CCHQPress) during the live broadcast so it appears as "factcheckUK", and posts pro-Conservative responses attacking Corbyn. Conservative Party chairman James Cleverly defends it as "calling out when the Labour Party put what they know to be complete fabrications in the public domain". The Electional Commission calls on all campaigners to act "responsibly", fact-checking body Full Fact criticises this behaviour as "inappropriate and misleading", and a spokesperson from Twitter says that they would take "decisive corrective action" if there were "further attempts to mislead people".

=== December ===
- 12 December – In the general election, the Conservative Party, led by Boris Johnson, achieves a majority of 80 seats in the House of Commons, while the Labour Party, led by Jeremy Corbyn, suffers major losses resulting in their lowest proportion of seats since 1935. The Scottish National Party wins a landslide in Scotland, winning 48 of the 59 seats.
- 13 December – Jo Swinson resigns as Leader of the Liberal Democrats after losing her constituency seat to the Scottish National Party. Jeremy Corbyn says he will not lead Labour into a future general election.

== History by issue ==
Note: This section is provided for issue-based overviews in narrative format, if desired.

=== Climate change ===
In April 2019, Extinction Rebellion's "International Rebellion" closed multiple London streets in protests over climate change with 1130 arrests, and in October further protests saw 1832 arrests.

In December 2019, the World Meteorological Organization released its annual climate report revealing that climate impacts are worsening. They found the global sea temperatures are rising as well as land temperatures worldwide. 2019 is the last year in a decade that is the warmest on record.

Global carbon emissions hit a record high in 2019, even though the rate of increase slowed somewhat, according to a report from Global Carbon Project.

=== Banking and finance ===
In the first half of 2019, global debt levels reached a record high of $250 trillion, led by the US and China. The IMF warned about corporate debt. The European Central Bank raised concerns as well.

==== EU banking ====
Concerns increased due to the euro area crisis as both Greece and Italy had high levels of public debt. This caused concerned about stability of the Euro. In December 2019, the EU announced that banking ministers from EU member nations had failed to reach agreement over proposed banking reforms and systemic change. The EU was concerned about high rates of debt in France, Italy and Spain. Italy objected to proposed new debt bailout rules that were proposed to be added to the European Stability Mechanism.

=== Foreign policy ===
==== Brexit negotiations ====
In March 2019, Prime Minister of the United Kingdom Theresa May and European leaders negotiated an extension for the Parliament of the United Kingdom to ratify the Brexit withdrawal agreement. The EU position was that the negotiation of terms for withdrawal had already ended in November 2018, and that the extension was only to give the UK Parliament more time to consider the Agreement. Negotiations during 2019 have been primarily within the UK Parliament on whether to accept the Theresa May Government's negotiated settlement, to leave the EU without any agreement, or to abandon Brexit.

In July, the newly assembled Boris Johnson ministry declared intention to re-open negotiations on the withdrawal agreement, with the Irish backstop removed as a pre-condition. UK and EU negotiators met for the first time on 28 August and meetings "will continue twice a week". Fresh proposals were released by the Johnson ministry in October, which the EU dismissed as unworkable.

The Benn Act, passed by the UK parliament in September, required the prime minister to seek a further extension in the event that by 19 October, a deal has not been reached and parliament has not given its consent to a No-deal Brexit. On 28 October 2019, the date was moved back to 2020.

=== World trade ===
==== US-China Trade Dispute ====
A trade dispute between the US and China caused economic concerns worldwide. In December 2019, various US officials said a trade deal was likely before a proposed round of new tariffs took effect on 15 December 2019. US tariffs had a negative effect on China's economy, which slowed to growth of 6%. In December 2019, new deal was announced regarding US-China trade dispute.

== Deaths ==
- 5 January – Derek Foster, Baron Foster of Bishop Auckland, 81, politician, MP for Bishop Auckland (1979–2005) and member of the House of Lords (since 2005), cancer.
- 9 January – Ian Adamson, 74, Northern Irish politician, Lord Mayor of Belfast (1996–1997), MLA (1998–2003).
- 11 January – Steffan Lewis, 34, Welsh politician, AM (since 2016).
- 27 January – Sir Reginald Eyre, 94, British politician, MP for Birmingham Hall Green (1965–1987).
- 6 February – Marcia Falkender, Baroness Falkender, 86, British politician.
- 10 February – Roderick MacFarquhar, 88, British politician, journalist and historian.
- 17 February – Paul Flynn, 84, British politician, MP for Newport West (since 1987).
- 10 March – Gordon McIntosh, 93, Scottish-born Australian politician, Senator (1974–1987).
- 15 April – Sir Roger Moate, 80, politician, MP (1970–1997), cancer.
- 2 May – Lord Toby Jug, 53, politician.
- 7 May – Seamus Close, 71, Northern Irish politician, liver cancer.
- 9 May – Brian Walden, 86, journalist and broadcaster (Weekend World) and politician, MP (1964–1977), emphysema.
- 18 May – Sir Timothy Kitson, 88, politician, MP for Richmond, North Yorkshire (1959–1983).
- 20 May – John Moore, Baron Moore of Lower Marsh, 81, politician, MP (1974–1992).
- 29 May – Michael Spicer, Baron Spicer, 76, politician, MP (1974–2010), chairman of the 1922 Committee (2001–2010) and Member of the House of Lords (since 2010), Parkinson's disease and leukaemia.
- 5 July – Sir Wynn Hugh-Jones, 95, diplomat and politician.
- 13 July – Rod Richards, 72, Welsh politician, MP for Clwyd North West (1992–1997), Leader of the Welsh Conservative Party (1999), cancer.
- 16 July – Michael English, 88, politician, MP for Nottingham West (1964–1983).
- 23 July – Ruth Gotlieb, 96, British-born New Zealand politician, Wellington City Councillor (1983–2001).
- 26 July – Bryan Magee, 89, philosopher and politician, MP (1974–1983).
- 12 August – Robyn Léwis, 89, Welsh author, politician and archdruid, Vice President of Plaid Cymru (1970–1976).
- 30 September – Sir David Akers-Jones, 92, politician, Chief Secretary for Administration (1985–1987) and acting Governor of Hong Kong (1986–1987), colon cancer.
- 26 October – Jack Dunnett, 97, politician and football administrator, MP for Nottingham Central (1964–1974) and Nottingham East (1974–1983).
- 9 November – Brian Mawhinney, 79, Northern Irish politician, MP (1979–2005), Secretary of State for Health (1992–1994).
- 11 November – Frank Dobson, 79, British politician, MP (1979–2015), Secretary of State for Health (1997–1999).
- 15 December – David Lambie, 94, politician and MP (1970–1992).
- 20 December – Bashir Maan, 93, Pakistani-British politician.
- 24 December – Andrew Miller, 70, politician, MP (1992–2015).

== See also ==
- 2019
- 2019 in the United Kingdom
- 2019 in politics and government
- 2010s in United Kingdom political history
- 2020s in United Kingdom political history
