= Ribble Valley Borough Council elections =

Local government elections in Lancashire, England

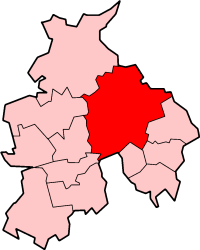
Ribble Valley shown within the non-metropolitan county of Lancashire (Unitary authorities excluded)

Ribble Valley Borough Council elections are held every four years. Ribble Valley Borough Council is the local authority for the non-metropolitan district of Ribble Valley in Lancashire, England. Since the last boundary changes in 2019, 40 councillors have been elected from 26 wards.

== Council elections ==
- 1973 Ribble Valley Borough Council election
- 1976 Ribble Valley Borough Council election (New ward boundaries)
- 1979 Ribble Valley Borough Council election
- 1983 Ribble Valley Borough Council election
- 1987 Ribble Valley Borough Council election (Borough boundary changes took place but the number of seats remained the same)
- 1991 Ribble Valley Borough Council election
- 1995 Ribble Valley Borough Council election
- 1999 Ribble Valley Borough Council election
- 2003 Ribble Valley Borough Council election (New ward boundaries increased the number of seats by 1)
- 2007 Ribble Valley Borough Council election
- 2011 Ribble Valley Borough Council election
- 2015 Ribble Valley Borough Council election
- 2019 Ribble Valley Borough Council election (new ward boundaries)
- 2023 Ribble Valley Borough Council election

== Election results ==
	Overall control	Conservative	Lib Dems	Labour	Green	Independent
2023	NOC	18	8	7	2	5
2019	Conservative	28	10	-	-	2
2015	Conservative	35	4	1	-	-
2011	Conservative	33	6	-	-	1
2007	Conservative	29	10	-	-	1
2003	Conservative	22	15	1	-	2

== Results maps ==
2003 results map

2007 results map

2011 results map

2015 results map

2019 results map

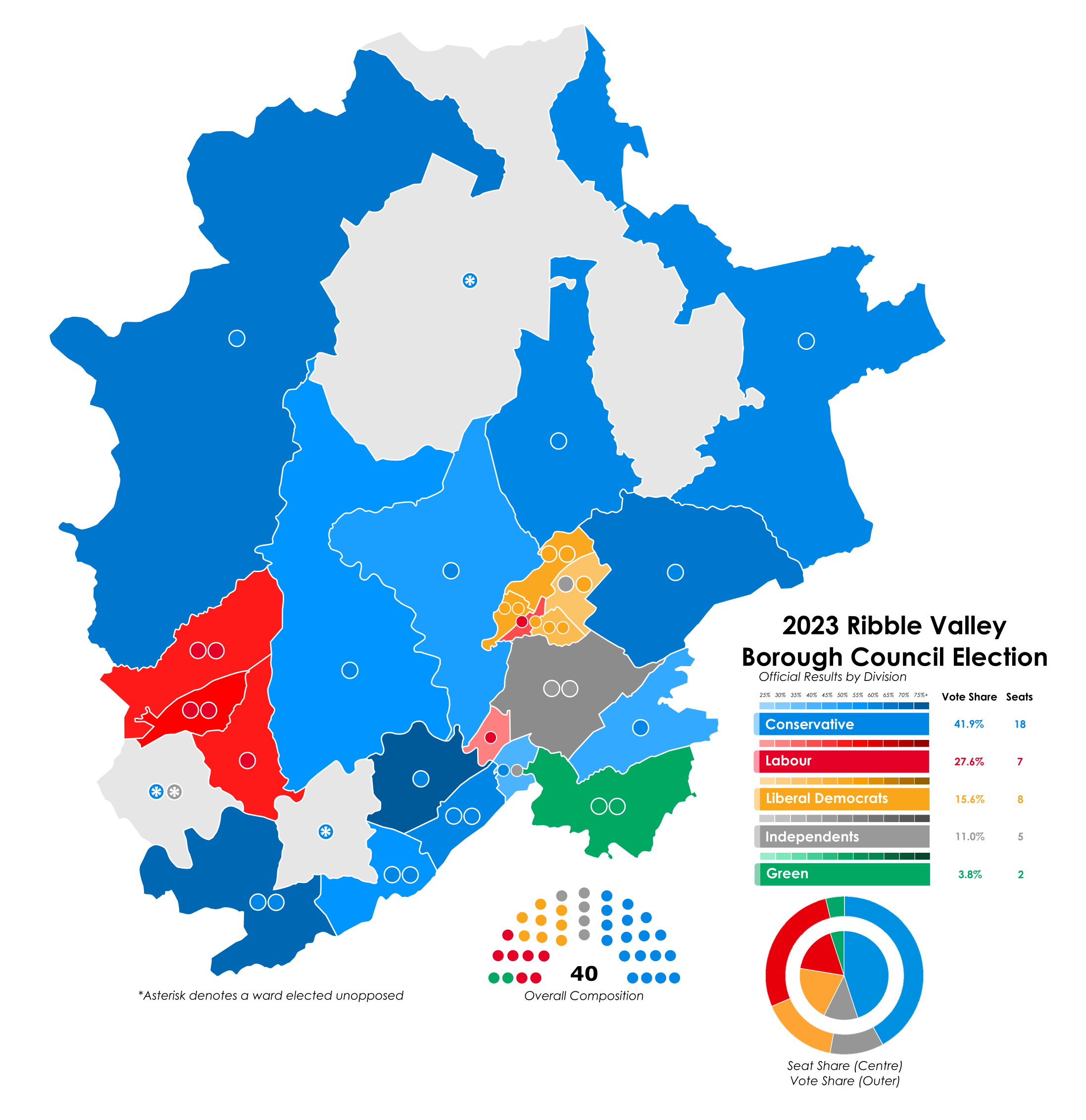
2023 results map

== By-election results ==
=== 1995–1999 ===
Chipping By-Election 4 July 1996
Party	Candidate	Votes	%	±%
Conservative		242	38.6	
Liberal Democrats		175	27.9	
Independent		137	21.9	
Independent		73	11.6	
Majority		67	10.7	
Turnout		627	55.5	
Conservative hold		Swing		

Wilpshire By-Election 17 October 1996
Party	Candidate	Votes	%	±%
Conservative		479	60.0	
Liberal Democrats		319	40.0	
Majority		160	20.0	
Turnout		798	39.3	
Conservative hold		Swing		

St James By-Election 26 June 1997
Party	Candidate	Votes	%	±%
Liberal Democrats		403	64.3	+2.6
Conservative		131	20.9	+6.2
Labour		92	14.7	−8.9
Majority		272	43.4	
Turnout		626	35.3	
Liberal Democrats hold		Swing		

Chipping By-Election 22 October 1998
Party	Candidate	Votes	%	±%
Independent		303	56.1	+56.1
Conservative		237	43.9	−17.9
Majority		66	12.2	
Turnout		540	47.0	
Independent gain from Conservative		Swing		

Gisburn Rimington By-Election 12 November 1998
Party	Candidate	Votes	%	±%
Conservative		224	75.2	+31.6
Liberal Democrats		74	24.8	−3.5
Majority		150	50.4	
Turnout		298	33.6	
Conservative hold		Swing		

=== 1999–2003 ===
Waddington By-Election 17 October 2002
Party	Candidate	Votes	%	±%
Conservative		220	53.1	−26.6
Liberal Democrats		194	46.9	+26.6
Majority		26	6.2	
Turnout		414	39.7	
Conservative hold		Swing		

=== 2007–2011 ===
Billington and Old Langho By-Election 23 October 2008
Party	Candidate	Votes	%	±%
Conservative	Carl Ross	350	61.1	+10.3
Liberal Democrats		181	31.6	−17.6
Labour		42	7.3	+7.3
Majority		169	29.5	
Turnout		573	24.6	
Conservative gain from Liberal Democrats		Swing		

Chatburn By-Election 4 June 2009
Party	Candidate	Votes	%	±%
Conservative	Gary Scott	439	75.3	−0.4
Liberal Democrats	Howard Douglas	144	24.7	+0.4
Majority		295	50.6	
Turnout		583		
Conservative hold		Swing		

Langho By-Election 4 June 2009
Party	Candidate	Votes	%	±%
Conservative	Mike Thomas	530	66.8	+1.4
Liberal Democrats	Susan Knox	263	33.2	−1.4
Majority		267	33.6	
Turnout		793		
Conservative hold		Swing		

=== 2011–2015 ===
Salthill By-Election 17 September 2011
Party	Candidate	Votes	%	±%
Conservative	Ian Brown	208	34.0	+4.6
Liberal Democrats	Simon O'Rourke	204	33.4	+9.2
UKIP	Steve Rush	159	26.0	+5.7
Labour	Mike Rose	40	6.5	−3.4
Majority		4	0.7	
Turnout		611		
Conservative gain from Liberal Democrats		Swing		

Littlemoor By-Election 1 August 2013
Party	Candidate	Votes	%	±%
Liberal Democrats	James Shervey	361	44.9	+6.1
Independent	Steve Rush	249	31.0	+31.0
Conservative	Jean Forshaw	109	13.6	−23.3
Labour	Liz Webbe	85	10.6	−13.7
Majority		112	13.9	
Turnout		804		
Liberal Democrats gain from Conservative		Swing		

=== 2019–2023 ===
Billington and Langho By-Election 6 May 2021
Party	Candidate	Votes	%	±%
Conservative	Steve Farmer	638	65.6	−3.4
Labour	Anthony McNamara	254	26.1	−4.9
Green	Anne Peplow	81	8.3	+8.3
Majority		384	39.5	
Turnout		973		
Conservative hold		Swing		

Mellor By-Election 6 May 2021
Party	Candidate	Votes	%	±%
Conservative	Robin Walsh	712	66.5	+12.1
Liberal Democrats	John Hymas	200	18.7	−7.0
Labour	Lee Jameson	109	10.2	−2.5
Green	Malcolm Peplow	50	4.7	+4.7
Majority		512	47.8	
Turnout		1,071		
Conservative hold		Swing		

West Bradford and Grindleton By-Election 6 May 2021
Party	Candidate	Votes	%	±%
Conservative	Kevin Horkin	416	71.4	+3.1
Labour	Paul Atkinson	90	15.4	+15.4
Liberal Democrats	Murray O'Rourke	77	13.2	−18.5
Majority		326	55.9	
Turnout		583		
Conservative hold		Swing		

Littlemoor By-Election 19 August 2021
Party	Candidate	Votes	%	±%
Liberal Democrats	Gaynor Hibbert	281	49.0	−8.9
Conservative	Jimmy Newhouse	216	37.7	+14.1
Labour	Mandy Pollard	59	10.3	−8.2
Green	Anne Peplow	17	3.0	+3.0
Majority		65	11.3	
Turnout		573		
Liberal Democrats hold		Swing		

Primrose By-Election 19 August 2021
Party	Candidate	Votes	%	±%
Liberal Democrats	Kerry Fletcher	200	43.9	−16.4
Conservative	Katei Blezard	119	26.1	+10.4
Labour	Michael Graveston	109	23.9	−0.1
Green	Malcolm Peplow	28	6.1	+6.1
Majority		81	17.8	
Turnout		456		
Liberal Democrats hold		Swing		

=== 2023–2027 ===
St Mary's By-Election 4 July 2024
Party	Candidate	Votes	%	±%
Labour	Bill Holden	597	32.8	
Conservative	Kristian Torgersen	583	32.1	
Liberal Democrats	Mark Sutcliffe	464	25.5	
Independent	Andrea Derbyshire	175	9.6	
Majority		14	0.8	
Turnout		1,819		
Labour gain from Liberal Democrats		Swing		

St Mary's By-Election 1 May 2025
Party	Candidate	Votes	%	±%
Liberal Democrats	Stephen Sutcliffe	302	25.6	+0.1
Reform	Warren Goldsworthy	298	25.3	+25.3
Conservative	Kristian Torgersen	244	20.7	−11.4
Labour	Mike Willcox	230	19.5	−13.3
Green	Grace McMeekin	105	8.9	+8.9
Majority		4	0.3	
Turnout		1,179		
Liberal Democrats gain from Labour		Swing		
