= 2019 Ribble Valley Borough Council election =

2019 UK local government election

Ribble Valley Borough Council Elections, 2019
← 2015	2 May 2019	2023 →

40 of 40 seats to Ribble Valley Borough Council 21 seats needed for a majority
	First party	Second party	Third party
	Con	LD	Ind
Party	Conservative	Liberal Democrats	Independent
Seats won	28	10	2
Seat change	▼7	▲6	▲2
Popular vote	12,595	4,507	636
Percentage	53.1%	20.3%	2.7%
Swing	▼11.1%	▲9.7%	▲2.7%
- Results of the 2019 Ribble Valley Borough Council election
Council control before election
Conservative
Council control after election
Conservative

The 2019 Ribble Valley Borough Council election was held on 2 May 2019 to elect members of Ribble Valley Borough Council in England. This was on the same day as other local elections.

== Summary ==
Ribble Valley Council 2019 Conservative Party (UK): 28 seats Liberal Democrats (UK): 10 seats Independent (politician): 2 seats

The 2019 Ribble Valley Borough elections saw the Labour Party lose its only elected Councillor. It also saw the Conservative Party make loses to the benefit of the Liberal Democrats who gained 6 Councillors on the Council. The Borough elections was the first time all wards in the Ribble Valley went up for election since 2015.

Summary of the 2019 Ribble Valley Borough Election results
Political party	Leader	Councillors						Votes		
Political party	Leader	Candidates	Total	Gained	Lost	Net	Of total (%)	Total	Of total (%)	Change} (%)
Conservative	Theresa May	40	28	0	7	▼7	70.0	12,595	53.1	▼11.1
Liberal Democrats	Vince Cable	16	10	6	0	▲6	25.0	4,809	20.3	▲9.7
Independent	N/A	2	2	2	0	▲2	5.0	636	2.7	▲2.7
Labour	Jeremy Corbyn	35	0	0	1	▼1	0.0	5,505	23.2	▼2.0
Green	Siân Berry and Jonathan Bartley	2	0	0	0	Steady	0.0	104	0.4	▲0.4
UKIP	Gerard Batten	1	0	0	0	Steady	0.0	76	0.3	▲0.3

== Ward results ==
=== Alston and Hothershall ===
Alston and Hothershall (2 seats)
Party	Candidate	Votes	%	±%
Conservative	Jim Rogerson	351	64.2	N/A
Conservative	Judith Clark	317	58.0	N/A
Labour	Stephanie Lomas	155	28.3	N/A
Labour	Maria Gee	124	22.7	N/A
Majority		386	29.7	N/A
Turnout		547	27.20	N/A
Conservative win (new seat)				
Conservative win (new seat)				

=== Billington and Langho ===
Billington and Langho (2 seats)
Party	Candidate	Votes	%	±%
Conservative	Ruth Baxter	525	63.1	N/A
Conservative	Anthony Austin	512	61.5	N/A
Labour	Anne Taylor	236	28.4	N/A
Labour	Maya Dibley	197	23.7	N/A
Majority		276	33.1	N/A
Turnout		832	32.56	N/A
Conservative win (new seat)				
Conservative win (new seat)				

=== Brockhall and Dinckley ===
Brockhall and Dinckley (1 seat)
Party	Candidate	Votes	%	±%
Conservative	Stephen Atkinson	305	83.3	N/A
Labour	Gerald Davies	61	16.7	N/A
Majority		244	66.6	N/A
Turnout		366	30.46	N/A
Conservative win (new seat)				

=== Chatburn ===
Chatburn (1 seat)
Party	Candidate	Votes	%	±%
Conservative	Gary Scott	368	88.5	N/A
Green	Gaye McCrum	48	11.5	N/A
Majority		320	77.0	N/A
Turnout		416	38.30	N/A
Conservative win (new seat)				

=== Clayton-le-Dale and Salesbury ===
Clayton-le-Dale and Salesbury (1 seat)
Party	Candidate	Votes	%	±%
Conservative	Louise Edge	391	85.2	N/A
Labour	Philip Gedling	68	14.8	N/A
Majority		323	70.4	N/A
Turnout		459	36.51	N/A
Conservative win (new seat)				

=== Derby and Thornley ===
Derby and Thornley (2 seats)
Party	Candidate	Votes	%	±%
Conservative	Stuart Carefoot	447	64.5	N/A
Conservative	Sarah Rainford	437	63.1	N/A
Labour	Jonathan Irwin	219	31.6	N/A
Labour	Bryan Dalgleish-Warburton	215	31.0	N/A
Majority		218	31.5	N/A
Turnout		693	30.96	N/A
Conservative win (new seat)				
Conservative win (new seat)				

=== Dilworth ===
Dilworth (2 seats)
Party	Candidate	Votes	%	±%
Conservative	Brian Holden	402	64.9	N/A
Conservative	Angeline Humphreys	356	57.5	N/A
Labour	Harold Gee	203	32.8	N/A
Labour	Nicholas Stubbs	202	32.6	N/A
Majority		153	24.7	N/A
Turnout		619	31.31	N/A
Conservative win (new seat)				
Conservative win (new seat)				

=== Edisford and Low Moor ===
Edisford and Low Moor (2 seats)
Party	Candidate	Votes	%	±%
Liberal Democrats	Simon O'Rourke	410	47.4	N/A
Liberal Democrats	Jennifer Schumann	339	39.2	N/A
Labour	Terry Richardson	222	25.7	N/A
Labour	Maureen Fenton	220	25.4	N/A
Conservative	Maria Berryman	211	24.4	N/A
Conservative	Peter Bryan	188	21.7	N/A
Majority		117	13.5	N/A
Turnout		865	33.69	N/A
Liberal Democrats win (new seat)				
Liberal Democrats win (new seat)				

=== Gisburn and Rimington ===
Gisburn and Rimington (1 seat)
Party	Candidate	Votes	%	±%
Conservative	Richard Sherras	268	67.5	N/A
Labour	David Waters	129	32.5	N/A
Majority		139	35.0	N/A
Turnout		397	35.85	N/A
Conservative win (new seat)				

=== Hurst Green and Whitewell ===
Hurst Green and Whitewell (1 seat)
Party	Candidate	Votes	%	±%
Conservative	Janet Alcock	232	57.1	N/A
Labour	Andrew MacFarlane	129	31.8	N/A
Liberal Democrats	Tony Haliwell	45	11.1	N/A
Majority		103	25.3	N/A
Turnout		406	39.31	N/A
Conservative win (new seat)				

=== Littlemoor ===
Littlemoor (2 seats)
Party	Candidate	Votes	%	±%
Liberal Democrats	Susan Knox	474	58.5	N/A
Liberal Democrats	Mark French	411	50.7	N/A
Conservative	Katei Blezard	193	23.8	N/A
Labour	Sue Riley	151	18.6	N/A
Labour	Giles Bridge	150	18.5	N/A
Conservative	Lisa Quinn-Jones	132	16.3	N/A
Majority		218	26.9	N/A
Turnout		810	34.97	N/A
Liberal Democrats win (new seat)				
Liberal Democrats win (new seat)				

=== Mellor ===
Mellor (2 seats)
Party	Candidate	Votes	%	±%
Conservative	Stella Brunskill	574	57.1	N/A
Conservative	Noel Walsh	549	54.6	N/A
Liberal Democrats	John Hymas	271	27.0	N/A
Liberal Democrats	Stephen Adnitt	163	16.2	N/A
Labour	Danielle Murtagh	134	13.3	N/A
Labour	Sheelagh Donnelly	112	11.1	N/A
UKIP	Stephen Sanderson	76	7.6	N/A
Majority		278	27.6	N/A
Turnout		1,005	43.36	N/A
Conservative win (new seat)				
Conservative win (new seat)				

=== Primrose ===
Primrose (2 seats)
Party	Candidate	Votes	%	±%
Liberal Democrats	Mary Robinson	418	57.9	N/A
Liberal Democrats	Alan Knox	403	55.8	N/A
Labour	Ronald Corbin	166	23.0	N/A
Labour	Karl Barnsley	151	20.9	N/A
Conservative	Kevin Horkin	109	15.1	N/A
Conservative	Charles McFall	98	13.6	N/A
Majority		237	32.8	N/A
Turnout		722	31.69	N/A
Liberal Democrats win (new seat)				
Liberal Democrats win (new seat)				

=== Ribchester ===
Ribchester (1 seat)
Party	Candidate	Votes	%	±%
Conservative	Alison Brown	268	61.3	N/A
Labour	Jennifer Berry	169	38.7	N/A
Majority		99	22.6	N/A
Turnout		437	35.45	N/A
Conservative win (new seat)				

=== Sabden ===
Sabden (1 seat)
Party	Candidate	Votes	%	±%
Conservative	John Newmark	288	65.6	N/A
Labour	Liz Birtwistle	151	34.4	N/A
Majority		137	31.2	N/A
Turnout		439	37.44	N/A
Conservative win (new seat)				

=== Salthill ===
Salthill (2 seats)
Party	Candidate	Votes	%	±%
Conservative	Ian Brown	372	48.1	N/A
Liberal Democrats	Donna O'Rourke	288	37.3	N/A
Conservative	Pam Dowson	264	34.2	N/A
Liberal Democrats	Chantelle Seddon	228	29.5	N/A
Labour	Liv Pamphlett	136	17.6	N/A
Labour	Carol Makin	119	15.4	N/A
Majority		24	3.1	N/A
Turnout		773	30.74	N/A
Conservative win (new seat)				
Liberal Democrats win (new seat)				

=== St Mary's ===
St Mary's (2 seats)
Party	Candidate	Votes	%	±%
Liberal Democrats	Stewart Fletcher	477	53.5	N/A
Liberal Democrats	Jonathan Hill	440	49.4	N/A
Conservative	Sue Hind	257	28.8	N/A
Conservative	Warren Bennett	175	19.6	N/A
Labour	Garry Dugdale	168	18.9	N/A
Labour	Jordan Campion	157	17.6	N/A
Majority		183	20.6	N/A
Turnout		891	38.68	N/A
Liberal Democrats win (new seat)				
Liberal Democrats win (new seat)				

=== Waddington, Bashall Eaves and Mitton ===
Waddington, Bashall Eaves and Mitton (1 seat)
Party	Candidate	Votes	%	±%
Liberal Democrats	Robert Buller	226	53.4	N/A
Conservative	Kenneth Hind	197	46.6	N/A
Majority		29	6.8	N/A
Turnout		423	35.37	N/A
Liberal Democrats win (new seat)				

=== West Bradford and Grindleton ===
West Bradford and Grindleton (1 seat)
Party	Candidate	Votes	%	±%
Conservative	Mary Hilton	301	68.3	N/A
Liberal Democrats	Edward Clayton	140	31.7	N/A
Majority		161	36.6	N/A
Turnout		441	33.99	N/A
Conservative win (new seat)				

=== Whalley and Painter Wood ===
Whalley and Painter Wood (2 seats)
Party	Candidate	Votes	%	±%
Conservative	Mark Hindle	456	65.4	N/A
Conservative	Ged Mirfin	421	60.4	N/A
Labour	Margaret Young	219	31.4	N/A
Labour	Joseph Kellaway	184	26.4	N/A
Majority		202	29.0	N/A
Turnout		697	31.96	N/A
Conservative win (new seat)				
Conservative win (new seat)				

=== East Whalley, Read and Simonstone ===
East Whalley, Read and Simonstone (2 seats)
Party	Candidate	Votes	%	±%
Conservative	Richard Bennett	572	81.5	N/A
Conservative	David Peat	500	71.2	N/A
Labour	Christopher O'Connor	122	17.2	N/A
Labour	Michael Graveston	102	14.4	N/A
Majority		378	54.0	N/A
Turnout		708	34.07	N/A
Conservative win (new seat)				
Conservative win (new seat)				

=== Whalley Nethertown ===
Whalley Nethertown (1 seat)
Party	Candidate	Votes	%	±%
Conservative	David Berryman	194	55.9	N/A
Labour	Ian Metcalfe	77	22.2	N/A
Liberal Democrats	Mark Powell	76	21.9	N/A
Majority		117	33.7	N/A
Turnout		347	31.31	N/A
Conservative win (new seat)				

=== Wilpshire and Ramsgreave ===
Wilpshire and Ramsgreave (2 seats)
Party	Candidate	Votes	%	±%
Conservative	Stuart Hirst	544	61.7	N/A
Conservative	Susan Bibby	531	60.3	N/A
Labour	Katherine Burn	288	32.7	N/A
Labour	Charles Cathcart	269	30.5	N/A
Majority		243	27.6	N/A
Turnout		881	33.55	N/A
Conservative win (new seat)				
Conservative win (new seat)				

=== Wiswell and Barrow ===
Wiswell and Barrow (2 seats)
Party	Candidate	Votes	%	±%
Independent	David Birtwhistle	336	55.2	N/A
Independent	Robert Thompson	300	49.3	N/A
Conservative	Steve Farmer	148	24.3	N/A
Conservative	Simon Kerins	142	23.3	N/A
Green	Oi Wrightson	56	9.2	N/A
Labour	David Turner	51	8.4	N/A
Labour	Julian Dunn	49	8.0	N/A
Majority		152	25.0	N/A
Turnout		609	41.34	N/A
Independent win (new seat)				
Independent win (new seat)				

== By-elections ==
=== Littlemore ===
Littlemore: 19 August 2021
Party	Candidate	Votes	%	±%
Liberal Democrats	Gaynor Hibbert	281	49.0	−8.9
Conservative	Jimmy Newhouse	216	37.7	+14.1
Labour	Mandy Pollard	59	10.3	−8.2
Green	Anne Peplow	17	3.0	New
Majority		65	11.3	−23.9
Turnout		573	21.8	−13.2
Liberal Democrats hold		Swing	▼11.5	

=== Primrose ===
Primrose: 19 August 2021
Party	Candidate	Votes	%	±%
Liberal Democrats	Kerry Fletcher	200	43.9	−16.5
Conservative	Katei Blezard	119	26.1	+10.4
Labour	Michael Graveston	109	23.9	−0.1
Green	Malcom Peplow	28	6.1	New
Majority		81	17.8	−15.0
Turnout		456	17.6	−14.1
Liberal Democrats hold		Swing	▼13.5	
