= 2021 UK Independence Party leadership election =

United Kingdom independence party (UKIP) leadership election

- 9–16 October 2021
- Turnout: 20.7%
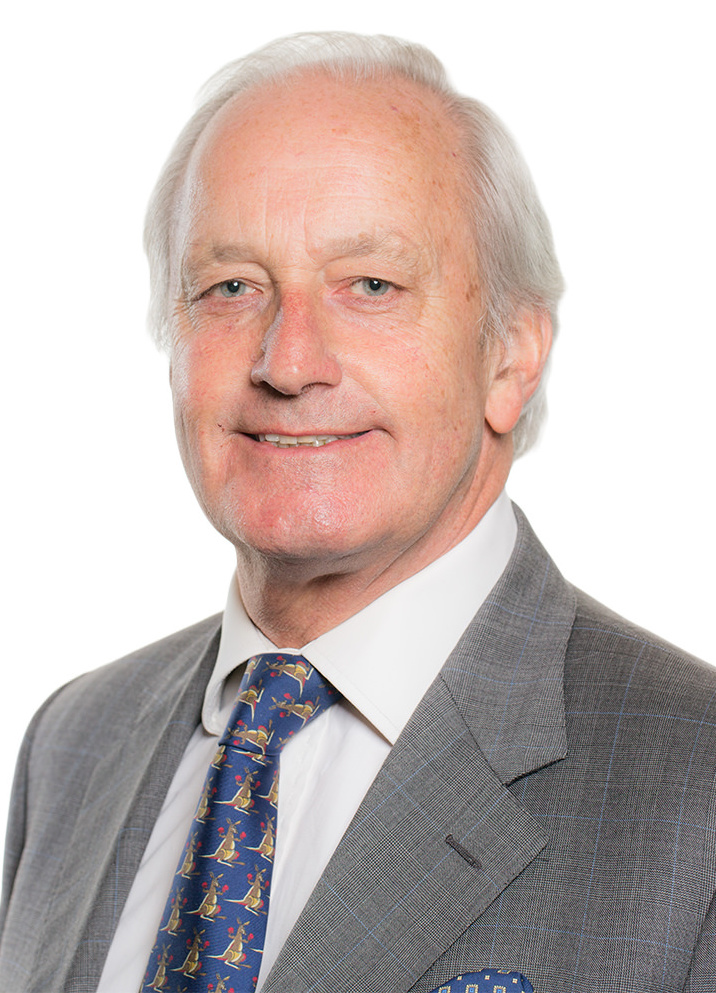
Candidate	Neil Hamilton	John Poynton
Percentage	78.9%	21.1%
Popular vote	498	133
Leader before election
Neil Hamilton (interim);
previously Freddy Vachha
Leader after election
Neil Hamilton

The 2021 UK Independence Party leadership election took place following the suspension on 12 September 2020 of leader Freddy Vachha from the UK Independence Party, with Neil Hamilton being elected to lead the party.

== Background ==
On 12 September 2020, Freddy Vaccha was suspended from the party and therefore the leadership after complaints of bullying and harassment, with Senedd (Welsh Parliament) member and former MP Neil Hamilton appointed as interim leader.

== Candidates ==
Candidate	Past and present political roles
Neil Hamilton	Member of Parliament for Tatton (1983–1997); Parliamentary Under-Secretary of State for Corporate Affairs (1992–1994); Deputy Chair of the UK Independence Party (2014–2016); Member of the Senedd for Mid & West Wales (2016–2021); Leader of UKIP Wales (2016–)
John Poynton	

== Result ==
Candidate	Votes	%	
✓ Neil Hamilton	498		78.9
John Poynton	133		21.1
Total	631	Turnout	20.7%
