= 2015 Ribble Valley Borough Council election =

2015 UK local government election

Ribble Valley Borough Council Elections, 2015
← 2011	7 May 2015	2019 →

40 of 40 seats to Ribble Valley Borough Council 21 seats needed for a majority
	First party	Second party	Third party
	Con	LD	LAB
Party	Conservative	Liberal Democrats	Labour
Seats won	35	4	1
Seat change	▲2	▼2	▲1
Popular vote	27,161	4,507	10,655
Percentage	64.2%	10.6%	25.2%
Swing	▲5.2%	▼5.6%	▲10.9%
- Results of the 2015 Ribble Valley Borough Council election
Council control before election
Conservative
Council control after election
Conservative

The 2015 Ribble Valley Borough Council election was held on 7 May 2015 to elect members of Ribble Valley Borough Council in England. This was on the same day as other local elections.

== Summary of result ==
The 2015 Ribble Valley Borough elections saw the Labour Party gain its first elected Councillor for 12 years. It also saw the Conservative Party make gains on the Council at the expense of the Liberal Democrats who lost two net Councillors. The Borough elections was first time all wards in the Ribble Valley went up for election since 2011.

Summary of the 2015 Ribble Valley Borough Election results
Political party	Leader	Councillors						Votes		
Political party	Leader	Candidates	Total	Gained	Lost	Net	Of total (%)	Total	Of total (%)	Change} (%)
Conservative	David Cameron	37	35	3	1	▲2	87.5	27,161	64.2	▲5.2
Liberal Democrats	Nick Clegg	10	4	1	3	▼2	10.0	4,507	10.6	▼5.6
Labour	Ed Miliband	31	1	1	0	▲1	2.5	10,655	25.2	▲10.9

== Ward results ==
=== Aighton, Bailey and Chaigley ===
Aighton, Bailey and Chaigley
Party	Candidate	Votes	%	±%
Conservative	Jan Alcock	593	70.6	▼1.0
Labour	Niall MacFarlane	247	29.4	▲12.3
Majority		347	41.2	▼13.3
Turnout		840	N/A	N/A
Conservative hold		Swing	▼6.7	

=== Alston and Hothershall ===
Alston and Hothershall (2 seats)
Party	Candidate	Votes	%	±%
Conservative	Jim Rogerson	806	42.0	▼0.7
Conservative	David Smith	750	39.1	▼8.9
Labour	Nicholas Anthony Madden	364	19.0	N/A
Majority		386	20.1	▼13.3
Turnout		1,920	N/A	N/A
Conservative gain from Independent		Swing		
Conservative hold		Swing		

=== Billington and Old Langho ===
Billington and Old Langho (2 seats)
Party	Candidate	Votes	%	±%
Conservative	Stephen Alexis Atkinson	1026	45.9	▲9.7
Conservative	Gerald Xavier Mirfin	786	33.2	▼1.2
Labour	Phil Gedling	424	19.0	N/A
Majority		362	14.2	▲7.3
Turnout		2,236	N/A	N/A
Conservative hold		Swing		
Conservative hold		Swing		

=== Bowland, Newton and Slaidburn ===
Bowland, Newton and Slaidburn
Party	Candidate	Votes	%	±%
Conservative	Rosie Elms	708	85.7	▼1.9
Labour	Gill Rose	118	14.3	▲1.9
Majority		590	71.4	▼3.8
Turnout		826	N/A	N/A
Conservative hold		Swing	▼1.9	

=== Chatburn ===
Chatburn
Party	Candidate	Votes	%	±%
Conservative	Gary Kenneth Scott	588	76.5	▲1.0
Labour	Michael John Rose	181	23.5	▲6.4
Majority		407	53.0	▼5.4
Turnout		769	N/A	N/A
Conservative hold		Swing	▼2.7	

=== Chipping ===
Chipping
Party	Candidate	Votes	%	±%
Conservative	Simon Hore	654	79.3	▼3.4
Labour	Alan William Matthews	171	20.7	N/A
Majority		483	58.6	▼3.8
Turnout		825	N/A	N/A
Conservative hold		Swing	▼4.4	

=== Clayton-Le-Dale with Ramsgreave ===
Clayton-Le-Dale With Ramsgreave (2 seats)
Party	Candidate	Votes	%	±%
Conservative	Peter Ainsworth	1047	47.9	▼0.9
Conservative	Doreen Taylor	748	34.2	▼3.6
Labour	Charles Cathcart	392	17.9	▲4.5
Majority		356	16.3	▼8.2
Turnout		2,187	N/A	N/A
Conservative hold		Swing		
Conservative hold		Swing		

=== Derby and Thornley ===
Derby and Thornley (2 seats)
Party	Candidate	Votes	%	±%
Conservative	Stuart Walter Carefoot	786	34.7	▲3.4
Conservative	Jim White	687	30.4	▲2.7
Labour	Greg Priest	423	18.7	▲4.3
Labour	Nick Stubbs	366	16.1	N/A
Majority		264	11.7	▼1.7
Turnout		2,262	N/A	N/A
Conservative hold		Swing		
Conservative hold		Swing		

=== Dilworth ===
Dilworth (2 seats)
Party	Candidate	Votes	%	±%
Conservative	Kenneth Harvard Hinds	823	34.1	▲3.9
Conservative	Rupert Keysell Swarbrick	786	32.5	▲3.7
Labour	Mike Everett	428	17.7	▲6.6
Labour	Kerry Frances Swinburne	380	15.7	▲7.2
Majority		358	14.8	▼2.9
Turnout		2,417	N/A	N/A
Conservative hold		Swing		
Conservative hold		Swing		

=== Edisford and Low Moor ===
Edisford and Low Moor (2 seats)
Party	Candidate	Votes	%	±%
Conservative	Sue Hind	583	27.8	▲14.9
Labour	Maureen Anne Fenton	439	20.9	▲7.7
Labour	Tom Wilkinson	396	18.9	▲8.5
Liberal Democrats	Stewart Fletcher	360	17.2	▼3.9
Liberal Democrats	Lynne Garvey	318	15.2	▼1.8
Majority		43	2.0	▼3.8
Turnout		2,096	N/A	N/A
Conservative gain from Liberal Democrats		Swing		
Labour gain from Liberal Democrats		Swing		

=== Gisburn and Rimington ===
Gisburn and Rimington
Party	Candidate	Votes	%	±%
Conservative	Richard Sherras	568	70.6	N/A
Labour	David Anthony Waters	237	29.4	N/A
Majority		331	41.2	N/A
Turnout		805	N/A	N/A
Conservative hold		Swing	N/A	

=== Langho ===
Langho (2 seats)
Party	Candidate	Votes	%	±%
Conservative	Paula Margaret Dobson	815	35.6	▼8.3
Conservative	Alison Mary Brown	749	32.7	▼4.2
Labour	Frank Joseph Harvard	374	16.3	▼2.9
Labour	Anne Taylor	352	15.4	N/A
Majority		375	16.4	▼1.3
Turnout		2,290	N/A	N/A
Conservative hold		Swing		
Conservative hold		Swing		

=== Littlemoor ===
Littlemoor (2 seats)
Party	Candidate	Votes	%	±%
Liberal Democrats	Sue Knox	639	26.5	▲5.9
Liberal Democrats	Mark French	475	19.7	▲2.3
Conservative	Jean Hayes	465	19.3	▼0.3
Labour	Sue Riley	452	18.7	▲5.8
Labour	Elizabeth Walters	381	15.8	▲4.8
Majority		10	0.4	▼0.8
Turnout		2,412	N/A	N/A
Liberal Democrats hold		Swing		
Liberal Democrats gain from Conservative		Swing		

=== Mellor ===
Mellor (2 seats)
Party	Candidate	Votes	%	±%
Conservative	Stella Maria Brunskill	1095	42.6	N/A
Conservative	Noel Clifford Walsh	1092	42.5	N/A
Labour	Elizabeth Webbe	385	15.0	N/A
Majority		707	27.5	N/a
Turnout		2,572	N/A	N/A
Conservative hold		Swing		
Conservative hold		Swing		

=== Primrose ===
Primrose (2 seats)
Party	Candidate	Votes	%	±%
Liberal Democrats	Mary Robinson	654	27.9	▲5.9
Liberal Democrats	Allan Knox	629	26.8	▲2.3
Conservative	Naomi Fern Chapelhow	393	16.8	▼0.3
Labour	Andrew Jonathan Bedford	363	15.5	▲5.8
Labour	Ron Corbin	304	13.0	▲4.8
Majority		236	10	▼0.8
Turnout		2,343	N/A	N/A
Liberal Democrats hold		Swing		
Liberal Democrats hold		Swing		

=== Read and Simonstone ===
Read and Simonstone (2 seats)
Party	Candidate	Votes	%	±%
Conservative	Richard Bennett	1099	50.2	▲8.8
Conservative	Lesley Jayne Graves	679	31.0	▼10.0
Labour	David Greenhough	411	18.8	N/A
Majority		268	12.2	▼17.3
Turnout		2,189	N/A	N/A
Conservative hold		Swing		
Conservative hold		Swing		

=== Ribchester ===
Ribchester
Party	Candidate	Votes	%	±%
Conservative	Ian Sayers	677	76.1	N/A
Labour	Sarah-Jane Bryant	213	23.9	N/A
Majority		464	52.2	N/A
Turnout		890	N/A	N/A
Conservative hold		Swing	N/A	

=== Sabden ===
Sabden
Party	Candidate	Votes	%	±%
Conservative	Ricky Newmark	432	53.1	▼26.7
Labour	Jo Barlow	382	46.9	N/A
Majority		50	6.2	▼53.4
Turnout		814	N/A	N/A
Conservative hold		Swing	▼36.8%	

=== Salthill ===
Salthill (2 seats)
Party	Candidate	Votes	%	±%
Conservative	Ian Frank Brown	745	30.8	▲10.2
Conservative	Pam Dowson	491	20.3	▲6.8
Liberal Democrats	Simon O'Rourke	400	16.5	▼0.5
Liberal Democrats	Donna O'Rourke	332	13.7	▲3.7
Labour	Michaela Campion	257	10.6	▲3.6
Labour	Freddie Redfern	192	7.9	▲1.5
Majority		91	3.8	▲0.6
Turnout		2,417	N/A	N/A
Conservative hold		Swing		
Conservative gain from Liberal Democrats		Swing		

=== St Mary's ===
St Mary's (2 seats)
Party	Candidate	Votes	%	±%
Conservative	Graham Richard Geldard	644	23.8	▼3.4
Conservative	Ruth Hargreaves	642	23.7	▼0.9
Liberal Democrats	Kerry Fletcher	396	14.6	▼1.0
Labour	Jordan Alexander Campion	376	13.9	▲5.2
Labour	Lily Perrin	345	12.7	▲4.3
Liberal Democrats	Paul Robinson	304	11.2	▼4.2
Majority		246	9.1	▲0.1
Turnout		2,707	N/A	N/A
Conservative hold		Swing		
Conservative hold		Swing		

=== Waddington and West Bradford ===
Waddington and West Bradford (2 seats)
Party	Candidate	Votes	%	±%
Conservative	Paul Francis Elms	N/A	Uncontested	N/A
Conservative	Bridget Hilton	N/A	Uncontested	N/A
Majority		N/A	N/A	N/A
Turnout		N/A	N/A	N/A
Conservative hold		Swing		
Conservative hold		Swing		

=== Whalley ===
Whalley (2 seats)
Party	Candidate	Votes	%	±%
Conservative	Joyce Holgate	1396	42.3	▲1.9
Conservative	Terry Hill	1308	39.6	▲3.8
Labour	Nick Furber	600	18.2	▲5.1
Majority		708	20.4	▼2.3
Turnout		3,304	N/A	N/A
Conservative hold		Swing		
Conservative hold		Swing		

=== Wilpshire ===
Wilpshire (2 seats)
Party	Candidate	Votes	%	±%
Conservative	Stuart Alan Hirst	982	43.8	▼1.1
Conservative	Sue Bibby	859	38.3	▼3.2
Labour	Elizabeth Clare Kellaway	400	17.8	▲4.1
Majority		459	21.5	▼6.3
Turnout		2,241	N/A	N/A
Conservative hold		Swing		
Conservative hold		Swing		

=== Wiswell and Pendleton ===
Wiswell and Pendleton
Party	Candidate	Votes	%	±%
Conservative	Robert James Thompson	659	68.6	▼16.4
Labour	Paul Anthony Atkinson	302	31.4	▲16.4
Majority		357	37.2	▼32.8
Turnout		961	N/A	N/A
Conservative hold		Swing	▼16.4	
