= Richard Braine (politician) =

Former Leader of the UK Independence Party

Leader of the UK Independence Party
- In office 10 August 2019 – 30 October 2019 (Note: Suspended from 12 October 2019 to 30 October 2019.)
- Chairman: Kirstan Herriot
- Preceded by: Gerard Batten
- Succeeded by: Freddy Vachha

Personal details
- Born: Richard William Maguire Braine; April 1968 (age 57–58) Chelsea, London, England
- Party: Heritage Party
- Other political affiliations: Referendum Party (before 1997); UK Independence Party (2015–2019)
- Education: Eton College
- Alma mater: King's College London (BSc)
- Website: www.braine.com

Richard William Maguire Braine (born April 1968) is a British software developer, photographer, and political figure who was leader of the UK Independence Party (UKIP) between 10 August 2019 and 30 October 2019.

== Early life ==
Born in London in April 1968, Braine was educated at Eton College, and graduated with a BSc in Physics and Philosophy from King's College London.

Since 1994, Braine has worked as a software developer and a designer, and has run a photography business based in London. He founded Cyberphotographer, a web-based event photography service, in 1999. Customers have included Cable & Wireless, Carlton Television, Channel 5, Ernst & Young, Eurosport, Hugo Boss, Jardine Lloyd Thompson, JPMorgan Chase, Lastminute.com, Microsoft Corporation, MTV, PlayStation, Puma, The Times and Time magazine.

== Early political career ==
Braine was a campaigner for the Referendum Party in the 1990s, and since the party's demise in 1997 has supported UKIP. During the 2016 EU referendum, Braine served as a borough manager for pro-Brexit organisations Vote Leave and Grassroots Out (GO) in Kensington and Chelsea, leading a group of ninety volunteers.

Braine has stood as a UKIP candidate in local, general and European Parliament elections. He received 85 votes in the 2016 Abingdon by-election to the Kensington and Chelsea London Borough Council. In the 2017 general election, he was the UKIP candidate for the constituency of Ruislip, Northwood and Pinner, where he came last of five, with 2.2 per cent of the vote. He was the second UKIP candidate on the London constituency list in the 2019 European Parliament election, behind party leader Gerard Batten, but they both failed to be elected.

== Leader of the UK Independence Party ==
=== Election as leader ===
On 10 August 2019, Braine was elected as the leader of UKIP, receiving 53% of the vote. He was endorsed by former UKIP leader Gerard Batten after the National Executive Committee prohibited Batten from standing. He became the first Old Etonian to lead UKIP since Lord Pearson of Rannoch.

=== 2019 party conference ===
Braine refused to attend UKIP's annual party conference in September 2019, in protest at the UKIP National Executive Committee's decision to no longer regard Gerard Batten as a member of the party "in good standing". He wrote: “I have made clear to the chairman and NEC that I would not attend unless something drastic was done to increase ticket sales, namely returning Gerard Batten to good standing to heal the rift with the many members who are boycotting conference for that reason”.

UKIP's party chairman, Kirstan Herriot, commented: "Both I and the NEC believe it is a complete insult to the membership to attempt to cancel conference because of a potentially low turn-out...it is also a particular affront to hard-working regional, county and branch officers who have worked hard in encouraging members to attend conference to hear Richard lay out his vision for the future of UKIP."

Neil Hamilton commented on Braine's refusal to attend the conference held in Newport, Wales, saying: "This would have been a great opportunity for him to make himself known in Wales and he has turned it down for a totally spurious reason", and that Braine "is a novice and he has only been involved in politics a couple of years, he is almost completely unknown".

=== Suspension from UKIP and resignation ===
In October 2019, Braine was suspended from UKIP after being accused of stealing data from the party, along with three other members: Jeff Armstrong, Mark Dent and Tony Sharp. All four members were reported to the National Fraud Intelligence Bureau. UKIP's application in the High Court for an injunction against Braine et alia was denied by Mr Justice Warby of the High Court Queen's Bench Division, who said that

"the prospects of UKIP establishing at a trial that any of the defendants to this claim obtained, and then threatened to disclose, confidential information... ...are slender in the extreme, or worse".

Braine resigned as leader at the end of October 2019, citing "internal conflict" and an inability to "prevent a purge of good members from the party". Despite this, UKIP proceeded with its claim, which was subsequently struck out after being adjudged "fanciful and without any proper and sound evidential foundation" in the High Court Judgement of 7 July 2020. Mr Justice Saini said...

"I see no basis for any conclusion other than that Mr. Braine acted to further the interests of the Party in the political direction which he, as Leader, was entitled to take… Equally, I fail to see how it is arguable that the decisions he made qua leader put Mr Braine in breach of his duties to the Claimant to act independently and in its best interests."

UKIP was ordered to pay Braine's costs.

== Personal life ==
Braine is married with four children, and lives in Chelsea, London, where he has contested local elections as a UK Independence Party candidate.
