= 2023 Ribble Valley Borough Council election =

2023 English local election

← 2019	4 May 2023	2027 →

All 40 seats to Ribble Valley Borough Council 21 seats needed for a majority

	First party	Second party	Third party
Leader	Stephen Atkinson	Stewart Fletcher
Party	Conservative	Liberal Democrats	Labour
Last election	28	10	0
Seats before	26	10	0
Seats after	18	8	7
Seat change	▼10	▼2	▲7
	Fourth party	Fifth party
Party	Independent	Green
Last election	2	0
Seats before	4	0
Seats after	5	2
Seat change	▲3	▲2
Leader before election
Stephen Atkinson
Conservative
Leader after election
Stephen Atkinson
Conservative
No overall control

The 2023 Ribble Valley Borough Council election took place on 4 May 2023 to elect all 40 members of Ribble Valley Borough Council in Lancashire, England. This was on the same day as other local elections across England.

== Results ==
The council was under Conservative majority control prior to the election. Following the results, the Conservatives remained the largest party but lost their majority, leaving the council under no overall control. Efforts by the other parties to put together a coalition administration were unsuccessful, and the Conservative group leader Stephen Atkinson was re-appointed leader of the council at the subsequent annual council meeting on 23 May 2023, leading a minority administration.

Party	Councillors			Votes	
Party		Of Total			Of Total
Conservative Party	18	45.0%	18 / 40	9,647	41.9%
Labour Party	7	17.5%	7 / 40	6,354	27.6%
Liberal Democrats	8	20.0%	8 / 40	3,597	15.6%
Independent	5	12.5%	5 / 40	2,526	11.0%
Green Party	2	5.0%	2 / 40	875	3.8%

== Ward results ==
Incumbent candidates are denoted with an asterisk*.

=== Alston and Hothershall ===
Alston and Hothershall (2 seats)
Party	Candidate	Votes	%	±%
Conservative	Derek Lee Brocklehurst	Unopposed		
Independent	James Rogerson* (Jim Rogerson)	Unopposed		
Conservative hold				
Independent gain from Conservative				

Jim Rogerson had been elected in 2019 as a Conservative but had left the party to sit as an independent in April 2021. Shown here as independent gain from Conservative to allow comparison with previous election.

=== Billington and Langho ===
Billington and Langho (2 seats)
Party	Candidate	Votes	%	±%
Conservative	Anthony Michael Austin* (Tony Austin)	463	57.2	−4.3
Conservative	Steven Farmer* (Steve Farmer)	410	50.7	−12.4
Labour	Frank Joseph Havard	273	33.7	+5.3
Independent	Brian John Robert	242	29.9	N/A
Turnout		811	31.04	−1.50
Conservative hold				
Conservative hold				

=== Bowland ===
Bowland
Party	Candidate	Votes	%	±%
Conservative	Rosemary Joan Elms*	Unopposed		
Conservative hold				

=== Brockhall and Dinckley ===
Brockhall and Dinckley
Party	Candidate	Votes	%	±%
Conservative	Stephen Alexis Atkinson*	315	77.4	−5.9
Labour	Ian James Metcalfe	92	22.6	+5.9
Turnout		407	31.71	+1.25
Conservative hold				

=== Chatburn ===
Chatburn
Party	Candidate	Votes	%	±%
Conservative	Gary Kenneth Scott*	268	65.8	−22.7
Labour	Craig Anthony Bryant	88	21.6	N/A
Liberal Democrats	Stephen Mark Sutcliffe	51	12.5	N/A
Turnout		407	36.44	−1.86
Conservative hold				

=== Chipping ===
Chipping
Party	Candidate	Votes	%	±%
Conservative	Simon Hore*	293	67.8	N/A
Labour	Alan Williams Matthews	139	32.2	N/A
Turnout		432	37.28	N/A
Conservative hold				

=== Clayton-le-Dale and Salesbury ===
Clayton-le-Dale and Salesbury
Party	Candidate	Votes	%	±%
Conservative	Louise Edge*	Unopposed		
Conservative hold				

=== Derby and Thornley ===
Derby and Thornley (2 seats)
Party	Candidate	Votes	%	±%
Labour	Rachael Elizabeth Ray	377	52.5	+20.9
Labour	Kieren Spencer	359	50.0	+19.0
Conservative	Stuart Walter Alan Carefoot*	318	44.3	−20.2
Conservative	Sarah Rainford*	306	42.6	−20.5
Turnout		718	28.72	
Labour gain from Conservative				
Labour gain from Conservative				

=== Dilworth ===
Dilworth (2 seats)
Party	Candidate	Votes	%	±%
Labour	Nicholas Kenneth Stubbs	417	55.9	+23.3
Labour	Lee Cedric Jameson	406	54.4	+21.6
Conservative	Craig Stephen Jackson	292	39.1	−25.8
Conservative	Lisa Ann Quinn-Jones	288	38.6	−18.9
Turnout		752	33.24	
Labour gain from Conservative				
Labour gain from Conservative				

=== East Whalley, Read and Simonstone ===
East Whalley, Read and Simonstone (2 seats)
Party	Candidate	Votes	%	±%
Green	Malcolm Charles Peplow	459	53.6	N/A
Green	Gaye Tomasine McCrum	364	42.5	N/A
Conservative	Richard John Bennett*	339	39.6	−41.9
Conservative	David Alan Peat*	277	32.3	−38.9
Labour	Chloe Catherine Hinder	81	9.5	−7.7
Labour	Joseph Anthony Kellaway	66	7.7	−6.7
Turnout		866	39.44	
Green gain from Conservative				
Green gain from Conservative				

=== Edisford and Low Moor ===
Edisford and Low Moor (2 seats)
Party	Candidate	Votes	%	±%
Liberal Democrats	Simon Michael O'Rourke*	417	50.9	+3.5
Liberal Democrats	Ryan John Corney	336	41.0	+1.8
Labour	Joseph James Batty	212	25.9	+0.2
Labour	Chantelle Louise Seddon	176	21.5	−3.9
Conservative	Timothy David Jones	131	16.0	−8.4
Conservative	Elspeth Russell-Shuker	105	12.8	−8.9
Independent	Francis Raw	43	5.3	N/A
Turnout		820	29.96	
Liberal Democrats hold				
Liberal Democrats hold				

=== Gisburn and Rimington ===
Gisburn and Rimington
Party	Candidate	Votes	%	±%
Conservative	Charles William Hamish McFall	203	64.0	−3.5
Labour	Sarah Jane Bryan	69	21.8	−10.7
Independent	Jennifer Maynard	45	14.2	N/A
Turnout		317	27.45	
Conservative hold				

=== Hurst Green and Whitewell ===
Hurst Green and Whitewell
Party	Candidate	Votes	%	±%
Conservative	Janet Elizabeth Alcock*	208	59.8	+2.7
Labour	Andrew Niall MacFarlane	140	40.2	+8.4
Turnout		348	33.43	
Conservative hold				

=== Littlemoor ===
Littlemoor (2 seats)
Party	Candidate	Votes	%	±%
Liberal Democrats	Gaynor Patricia Hibbert*	310	42.8	−15.7
Liberal Democrats	Mark Richard French*	289	39.9	−10.8
Conservative	Peter Neilson Sharples	199	27.4	+3.6
Conservative	Connor Frazer William Graham	188	25.9	+9.6
Labour	Carol Ann Makin	163	22.5	+3.0
Labour	Susan Elizabeth Riley	138	19.0	+0.4
Independent	Kim Haley	52	7.2	N/A
Turnout		726	27.45	
Liberal Democrats hold				
Liberal Democrats hold				

=== Mellor ===
Mellor (2 seats)
Party	Candidate	Votes	%	±%
Conservative	Stella Maria Brunskill*	504	59.0	+1.9
Conservative	Robin Eric Walsh*	465	54.4	−0.2
Independent	John Russell Fletcher	337	39.5	N/A
Turnout		875	38.56	
Conservative hold				
Conservative hold				

=== Primrose ===
Primrose (2 seats)
Party	Candidate	Votes	%	±%
Labour	Michael St John Graveston	344	43.6	+20.6
Liberal Democrats	Mary Robinson*	307	38.9	−19.0
Labour	Michael Kenneth Willcox	296	37.5	+16.6
Liberal Democrats	Kerry Elizabeth Fletcher*	262	33.2	−22.6
Conservative	Benjamin Tyrer Muldoon	121	15.3	+0.2
Conservative	Bilal Haider Karim	88	11.2	−2.4
Independent	Simon Rice	36	4.6	N/A
Turnout		797	30.71	
Labour gain from Liberal Democrats				
Liberal Democrats hold				

=== Ribchester ===
Ribchester
Party	Candidate	Votes	%	±%
Labour	Karl Peter Barnsley	276	53.3	+14.6
Conservative	Alison Mary Brown*	190	36.7	−24.6
Green	Paul Ryan Yates	52	10.0	N/A
Turnout		518	43.25	
Labour gain from Conservative				

=== Sabden ===
Sabden
Party	Candidate	Votes	%	±%
Conservative	John Richard Newmark* (Richard Newmark)	201	48.9	−16.7
Labour	Mark Benjamin Dawson	179	43.6	+9.2
Liberal Democrats	Steven John Mitchell	31	7.5	N/A
Turnout		411	33.91	
Conservative hold				

=== Salthill ===
Salthill (2 seats)
Party	Candidate	Votes	%	±%
Independent	Ian Frank Brown*	388	47.2	−0.9
Liberal Democrats	Donna Louise O'Rourke*	301	36.6	−0.7
Conservative	Kristian Torgersen	249	30.3	−3.9
Liberal Democrats	Philip Neilson Young	167	20.3	−9.2
Labour	Ian David Turner	120	14.6	−3.0
Labour	Carl Peter Nuttall	108	13.1	−2.3
Turnout		826	31.61	
Independent gain from Conservative				
Liberal Democrats hold				

Ian Brown had been elected in 2019 as a Conservative but had left the party to sit as an independent in April 2021. Shown here as independent gain from Conservative to allow comparison with previous election.

=== St Mary's ===
St Mary's (2 seats)
Party	Candidate	Votes	%	±%
Liberal Democrats	Stewart Mark Fletcher*	498	54.4	+0.9
Liberal Democrats	Jonathan Hill*	419	45.7	−3.7
Conservative	Claire Elizabeth Hibbitt	287	31.3	+2.5
Conservative	Sue Elizabeth Monk	231	25.2	+5.6
Labour	Jonathan James Hinder	157	17.1	−1.8
Labour	Frederick Jeevan Redfern	133	14.5	−3.1
Turnout		921	36.94	
Liberal Democrats hold				
Liberal Democrats hold				

=== Waddington, Bashall Eaves and Mitton ===
Waddington, Bashall Eaves and Mitton
Party	Candidate	Votes	%	±%
Conservative	Sophie Cowman	212	53.5	+6.9
Liberal Democrats	Robert Buller* (Bob Buller)	125	31.6	−21.8
Labour	Catherine Ruth Lee	59	14.9	N/A
Turnout		396	32.98	
Conservative gain from Liberal Democrats				

=== West Bradford and Grindleton ===
West Bradford and Grindleton
Party	Candidate	Votes	%	±%
Conservative	Kevin Thomas Horkin*	293	60.8	−7.5
Labour	Rebecca Anna Haydock	105	21.8	N/A
Liberal Democrats	Lindsey John Blackledge	84	17.4	−14.3
Turnout		482	36.10	
Conservative hold				

=== Whalley and Painter Wood ===
Whalley and Painter Wood (2 seats)
Party	Candidate	Votes	%	±%
Conservative	Mark Andrew Hindle*	336	40.1	−25.3
Independent	John Stephen Atherton	327	39.1	N/A
Conservative	Gerald Xavier Mirfin* (Ged Mirfin)	321	38.4	−22.0
Labour	Anthony McNamara	280	33.5	+2.1
Independent	Blaire Harthern	199	23.8	−2.6
Turnout		840	37.35	
Conservative hold				
Independent gain from Conservative				

=== Whalley Nethertown ===
Whalley Nethertown
Party	Candidate	Votes	%	±%
Labour	Aaron Oghenevwede Wilkins-Odudu	137	33.8	+11.6
Conservative	David Andrew Berryman*	127	31.4	−24.5
Independent	Katherine Lord-Green	125	30.9	N/A
Independent	Robert Charles Edmond	16	4.0	N/A
Turnout		405	35.26	
Labour gain from Conservative				

=== Wilpshire and Ramsgreave ===
Wilpshire and Ramsgreave (2 seats)
Party	Candidate	Votes	%	±%
Conservative	Susan Mary Bibby*	472	52.6	−7.7
Conservative	Stuart Alan Hirst*	469	52.2	−9.5
Labour	Katherine Elizabeth Burn	381	42.4	+9.7
Labour	Charles Berkeley Cathcart	347	38.6	+8.1
Turnout		906	34.42	
Conservative hold				
Conservative hold				

=== Wiswell and Barrow ===
Wiswell and Barrow (2 seats)
Party	Candidate	Votes	%	±%
Independent	David Birtwhistle*	432	52.9	−2.3
Independent	Lee Anthony Street	320	39.2	−10.1
Conservative	Andrew John McHugh	271	33.2	+8.9
Conservative	Jacqueline Mary Hampson	207	25.3	+2.0
Labour	George Iain Poole	125	15.3	+6.9
Labour	Paul Anthony Atkinson	111	13.6	+5.6
Turnout		818	37.96	
Independent hold				
Independent hold				

== Changes 2023–2027 ==
- Derek Brocklehust, who was elected as a Conservative, joined Labour in October 2023.
- Stewart Fletcher, Mark French and Ryan Corney, all elected as Liberal Democrats, left the party in November 2023, becoming independents but sitting together as the 'Progressive Liberal' group.

St Mary's by-election, 4 July 2024
Party	Candidate	Votes	%	±%
Labour	William Hillis Holden	597	32.8	+15.7
Conservative	Kristian Torgersen	583	32.1	+0.8
Liberal Democrats	Stephen Mark Sutcliffe	464	25.5	−28.9
Independent	Andrea Marie Derbyshire	175	9.6	N/A
Turnout		1,819	68.9	
Labour gain from Liberal Democrats				

By-election triggered by resignation of Stewart Fletcher, who had been elected as a Liberal Democrat but left the party in November 2023.

St Mary's by-election, 1 May 2025
Party	Candidate	Votes	%	±%
Liberal Democrats	Stephen Mark Sutcliffe	302	25.6	+0.1
Reform UK	Warren Goldsworthy	298	25.3	N/A
Conservative	Kristian Torgersen	244	20.7	−11.4
Labour	Michael Kenneth Wilcox	230	19.5	−13.3
Green	Grace Eleanor McMeekin	105	8.9	N/A
Turnout		1,179	43.77	
Liberal Democrats gain from Labour				

By-election triggered by death of William Holden, who had been elected for the Labour Party in a by-election in July 2024. Changes are shown from that by-election.
