= 2019 UK Independence Party leadership election =

United Kingdom independence party (UKIP) leadership election

- 10 August 2019
- Turnout: 19.1% (▼15.3%)

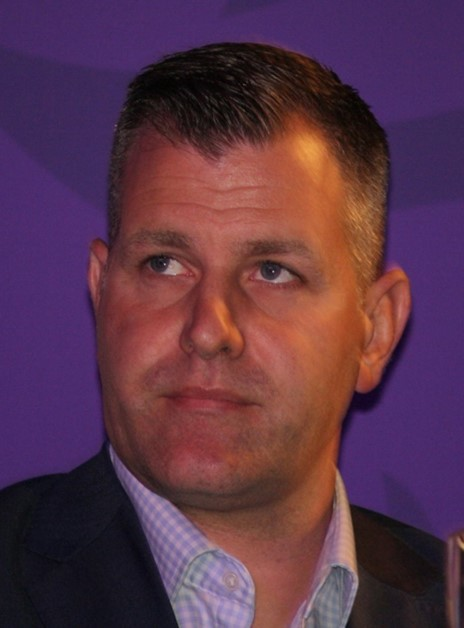

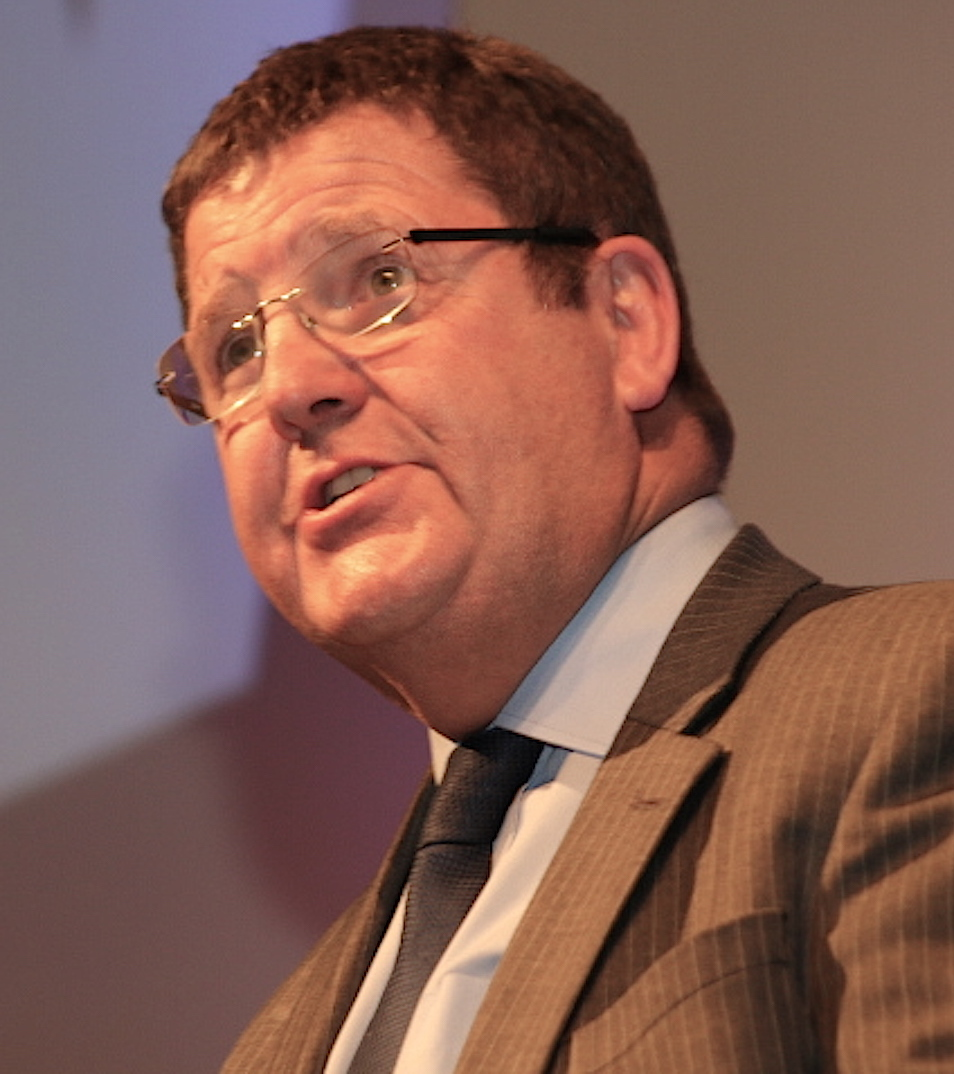
Candidate	Richard Braine	Freddy Vachha
Percentage	53%	20%
Popular vote	2,935	1,134
Candidate	Ben Walker	Mike Hookem
Percentage	14%	13%
Popular vote	753	717
Leader before election
Gerard Batten
Leader after election
Richard Braine

The 2019 UK Independence Party leadership election took place following the departure on 2 June of Gerard Batten from the leadership of the UK Independence Party. The result was announced on 10 August 2019, with Richard Braine being elected to lead the party. This was the party's fifth leadership election in three years. Braine resigned just two months later, triggering a sixth leadership election.

== Background ==
On 6 May 2019, and following media reports that Batten was to step down as leader on 2 June, he said that his election in April 2018 was for a twelve-month period, and that the party's National Executive Committee had asked him to remain in office until after the European elections in May 2019.

Former leader Nigel Farage was one of a number of senior party figures to leave during Batten's leadership over Batten's association with far-right activist Tommy Robinson. In April 2019, Farage launched the rival Brexit Party. UKIP won 24 MEPs in the 2014 European Parliament election, but 21 had left the party by the May 2019 European elections, with most defecting to The Brexit Party. It lost all three remaining MEPs, falling to 3.3% of the vote.

== Candidates ==
Freddy Vachha, UKIP London Regional chairman and present General Secretary, announced his intention to run on 6 May.

Mike Hookem, the party's former Member of the European Parliament for Yorkshire and the Humber, resigned as deputy leader and announced that he would run for the leadership on 24 May, criticising Batten for associating the party with the far-right.

Gareth Bennett, a member for the National Assembly for Wales for UKIP, announced his candidacy on 3 June. His policy platform included national identity cards and a possible referendum on bringing back the death penalty. On 11 July, he announced his withdrawal from the race and his support for Ben Walker's bid for the leadership.

Walker, a former Parliamentary candidate, member of the UKIP NEC and branch chairman, announced his candidacy on 6 June.

Richard Braine, chairman of UKIP West London, and formerly a UKIP Parliamentary candidate for Ruislip, Northwood and Pinner (2017), and EU Parliamentary candidate for the London Region (2019), also stood.

Helena Windsor, the chairman of the UKIP Surrey Branch and county councillor for Godstone from 2013 to 2017, was a candidate, but withdrew on 17 July, and publicly backed Mike Hookem.

Applications for the party leadership closed on 27 June. Despite having previously said his position as leader "would be untenable" if he lost his seat in the European Parliament, Gerard Batten announced that he would stand in the leadership election, claiming he had "overwhelming support from UKIP members". The party's National Executive Committee blocked him from standing, leaving five candidates up for election. Batten supported Braine instead.

Candidate	Past and present political roles	Endorsements
Mike Hookem	Member of the European Parliament for Yorkshire and the Humber (2014–2019); Deputy Leader of the UK Independence Party (2018–2019)	Helena Windsor
Freddy Vachha	UKIP London Regional Chairman (2016–present)	Stuart Agnew
Ben Walker	Mayor of Bradley Stoke, Gloucestershire (until 2012); Former Vice Chair of South Gloucestershire District Council; UKIP Filton and Bradley Stoke branch chairman; Member of the UKIP National Executive Committee (2017–present)	Gareth Bennett Neil Hamilton
Richard Braine	UKIP West London chairman (2016–present)	Gerard Batten

== Result ==
Candidate	Votes	%	
✓ Richard Braine	2,935		52.9
Freddy Vachha	1,134		20.5
Ben Walker	753		13.6
Mike Hookem	717		13.0
Spoilt ballots	194		3.5
Total	5,539	Turnout	19.1%
