= Gerard Batten =

Former leader of the UK Independence Party

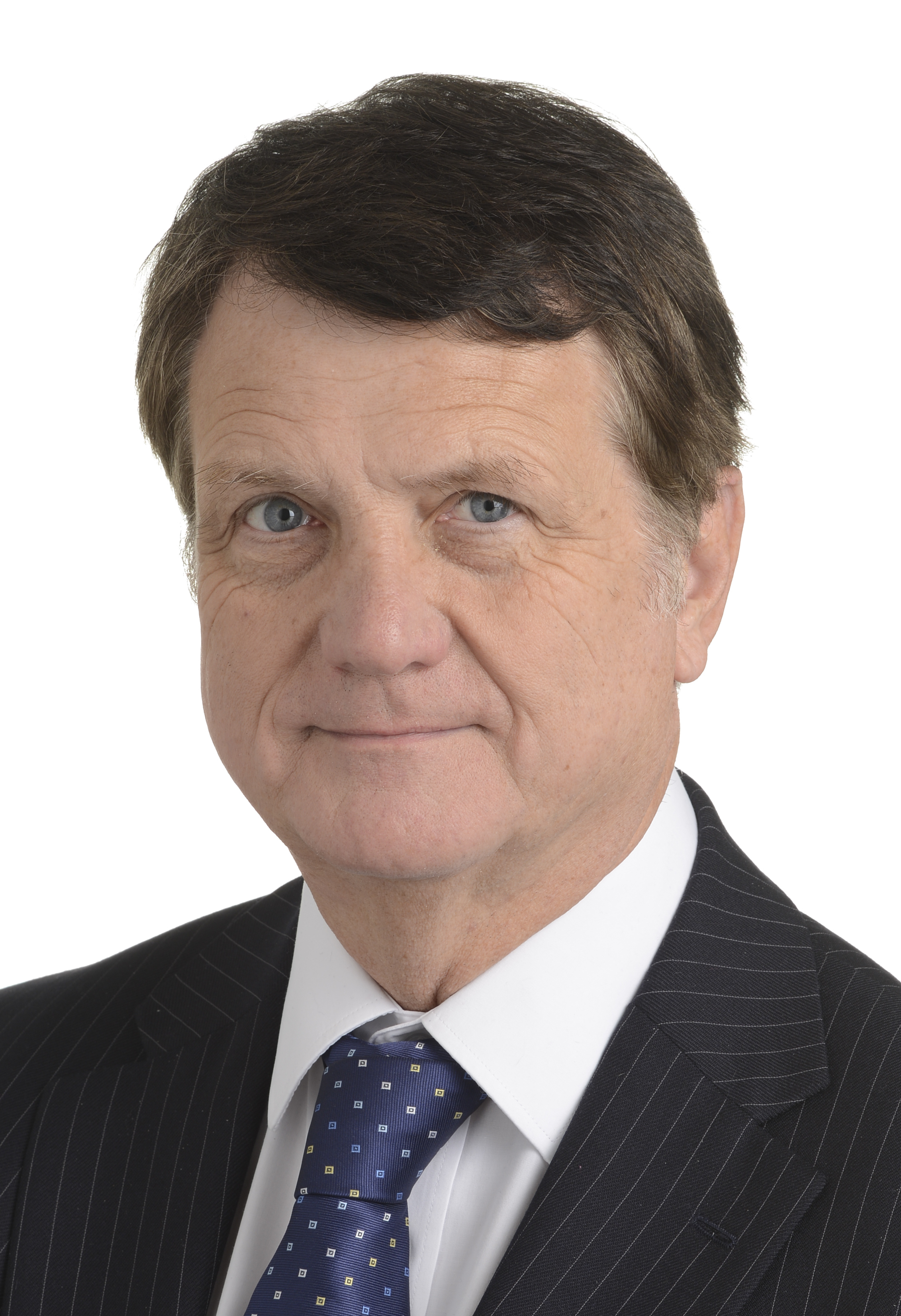
- Official portrait, 2018

Leader of the UK Independence Party
- In office 14 April 2018 – 2 June 2019 (Note: Acting from 17 February to 14 April 2018)
- Deputy: Mike Hookem
- Preceded by: Henry Bolton
- Succeeded by: Richard Braine

Leader of UKIP in the European Parliament
- In office 14 April 2018 – 1 July 2019
- Deputy: Ray Finch; Stuart Agnew
- Preceded by: Ray Finch
- Succeeded by: Office abolished

Member of the European Parliament for London
- In office 10 June 2004 – 1 July 2019
- Preceded by: Nicholas Bethell
- Succeeded by: Ben Habib

General Secretary of the UK Independence Party
- In office 1994–1997
- Leader: Alan Sked; Craig Mackinlay (acting)
- Preceded by: Office established
- Succeeded by: Douglas Denny

UKIP portfolios
- 2013–2015: Immigration
- 2016–2019 (Note: Batten briefly resigned as Brexit spokesman in January 2018, citing opposition to the leadership of Henry Bolton. Following Bolton's removal by the party in February 2018, Batten was appointed as acting Party Leader. He continued in his previous role as UKIP's Spokesman on Exiting the EU.): Exiting the European Union

Personal details
- Born: Gerard Joseph Batten; 27 March 1954 (age 72) Romford, Essex, England
- Party: UK Independence Party (1993–2019); Anti-Federalist League (1991–1993)
- Spouse: Frances Cayaban (m. 1988)

Gerard Joseph Batten (born 27 March 1954) is a British politician who served as the Leader of the UK Independence Party (UKIP) from 2018 to 2019. He was a founding member of the party in 1993, and served as a Member of the European Parliament (MEP) for London from 2004 to 2019.

== Early life ==
Batten was born in Romford, Essex, on 27 March 1954. He grew up on the Isle of Dogs in the East End of London. Before entering politics he was employed as a salesman for British Telecom.

== Political career ==
Batten was a member of the Anti-Federalist League, an early Eurosceptic cross-party political alliance from 1992 to 1993. He was one of the founding members of the UK Independence Party (UKIP) in 1993, and was its first General Secretary from 1994 to 1997. He has been a member of UKIP's National Executive Committee several times.

Batten was first elected as a Member of the European Parliament in the 2004 European Parliamentary Election for the London constituency on the basis of seeking the withdrawal of the United Kingdom from the European Union.

During his first term of office Batten served as a member of the European Parliament's Subcommittee on Security and Defence (from July 2004), and was appointed as UKIP's official spokesman on Security and Defence. In this role, he attacked the-then Labour government's plans to introduce identity cards.

At the 2007 UKIP annual conference, he was selected as the party's candidate to contest the 2008 London Mayoral Election, in which he received a 1.2% share of the vote.

Batten stood in the 2009 UKIP leadership election, coming second in a field of five behind the winner Lord Pearson. From 2009 to 2014, he held the office of UKIP's Chief Whip in the European Parliament. From 2016 to 2018, Batten served as the UKIP Spokesman for Exiting the European Union.

In 2011, Batten spoke with Julian Assange's lawyers and began advocating for him in the media and in European Parliament.

=== Alexander Litvinenko and Romano Prodi ===
In early April 2006, Batten stated that a London constituent and former Federal Security Service (FSB) agent, Lieutenant-Colonel Alexander Litvinenko, had been told by Mario Scaramella, that Romano Prodi, the former Prime Minister of Italy and president of the European Commission, had been the KGB's "man in Italy". Batten demanded an inquiry into the allegations. He told the European Parliament that Litvinenko had been warned by FSB deputy chief General Anatoly Trofimov that there were numerous former KGB agents among Italian politicians, and that "Romano Prodi is our man in Italy". The allegations were rejected by Prodi.

On 26 April 2006, Batten repeated his call for a parliamentary inquiry. He said: "Former, senior members of the KGB are willing to testify in such an investigation, under the right conditions... It is not acceptable that this situation is unresolved, given the importance of Russia's relations with the European Union." Litvinenko was admitted to hospital with suspected poisoning on 11 November 2006 after eating at a London restaurant, and died on 23 November 2006. The police later concluded he had been poisoned with polonium; a small dose of which is lethal. Anatoly Trofimov was assassinated by unknown gunmen in April 2005. On 22 January 2007, BBC News and ITV News released documents and video footage from February 2006 in which Litvinenko made the same allegations against Prodi.

The Mitrokhin Commission, which was established in 2002 and closed in 2006 with a majority and a minority report, without reaching shared conclusions, and without any concrete evidence given to support the original allegations of KGB ties to Italian politicians contained in the Mitrokhin Archive. Led by the centre-right coalition majority, it was criticized as politically motivated, as it was focused mainly on allegations against opposition figures. In November 2006, the new Italian Parliament with a centre-left coalition majority instituted a commission to investigate the Mitrokhin Commission for allegations that it was manipulated for political purposes. In December 2006, colonel ex-KGB agent Oleg Gordievsky, whom Scaramella claimed as his source, confirmed the accusations made against Scaramella regarding the production of false material relating to Prodi and other Italian politicians, and underlined their lack of reliability.

=== European Union, Ireland and Brexit ===
In a 2013 interview with openDemocracy, Batten argued that the European Union was inspired by the proposals the Nazis developed in 1942 for Europe after they had won the Second World War, stating they were very similar to the 1957 Treaty of Rome.

In 2017, in response to the Irish Government's intervention in the Brexit negotiations, Batten expressed the view on Twitter that Ireland, "a tiny country that relies on UK for its existence", is "the weakest kid in the playground sucking up to the EU bullies". He advocated the revocation of the Common Travel Area between Ireland and the UK. Ireland's Foreign Minister, Simon Coveney, rejected Batten's claims: "Ireland is not threatening anybody, least of all a friend, but we remain resolute in our insistence on a sensible way through Brexit that protects Ireland." A UKIP spokesman said Batten's comments do not reflect party policy.

=== Views of multiculturalism and Islam ===
In 2006, Batten commissioned a document from Sam Solomon, "A Proposed Charter of Muslim Understanding", which amounts to a proposed code of conduct, including the rejection of passages in the Qur'an that propose "violent physical Jihad", and that should be considered "inapplicable, invalid and non-Islamic". When asked why Muslims should sign up to such a document, he told The Guardian's Rowena Mason in February 2014: "Christians aren't blowing people up at the moment, are they?"

Batten participated in the international counter-jihad conference in Brussels in 2007, and has been said to have long-standing links with the counter-jihad movement. In 2008, Batten invited the Dutch Party for Freedom (PVV) leader and MEP Geert Wilders to the European Parliament, in an unsuccessful attempt to screen Wilders' film Fitna for MEPs. According to Batten in Freedom Today, Wilders "is a brave man trying to defend western civilisation in the face of its own loss of the most basic instinct of self-preservation". When Wilders was refused entry to the UK at Heathrow Airport in 2009, following an invitation from the UKIP peer Lord Pearson for Wilders to screen his film to members of the House of Lords, Batten said: "We can't do anything about murderers, rapists and paedophiles coming from the EU but they will stop a democratically elected politician from the EU talking about the sources of terrorism." In a 2010 video, Batten said that no further mosques should be built in British cities, and thought the existence of "two incompatible systems living in the same place at the same time" was a threat.

In 2011, Batten circulated a draft four-page document entitled "Confidential draft – Dismantling Multiculturalism" to Christian Concern, a lobby group. He wrote: "Islamic fundamentalism is the cuckoo in the western multicultural nest. We can either address it now or be destroyed by it in the course of time." The document advocates repealing "the act of parliament that gives exception for ritual slaughter for religious reasons" and any law which "gives official recognition to Islamic banking". The Treasury told The Guardian that no UK legislation mentions any such financial service. When asked about the document in 2014, Batten called it "a rough draft which I would like to publish in due course but it's not one of my priorities at the moment. You can't hold me to anything in it."

In 2018, at a rally of protesters demanding the release of Tommy Robinson, Batten described Muhammad as "a paedophile who kept sex slaves" and, in an interview with Sky News, said that Muslim ideology legitimised sex slaves.

=== Complaint of censorship ===
In 2018, Batten was featured in the Channel 4 documentary Carry on Brussels: Inside the EU. A reviewer from The Guardian said the high point of the programme was the scene in which he left the European Parliament chamber, complaining of being censored because his microphone had been cut off. Others point out that he had overrun the allocated time for speeches.

== UKIP leadership (2018–2019) ==
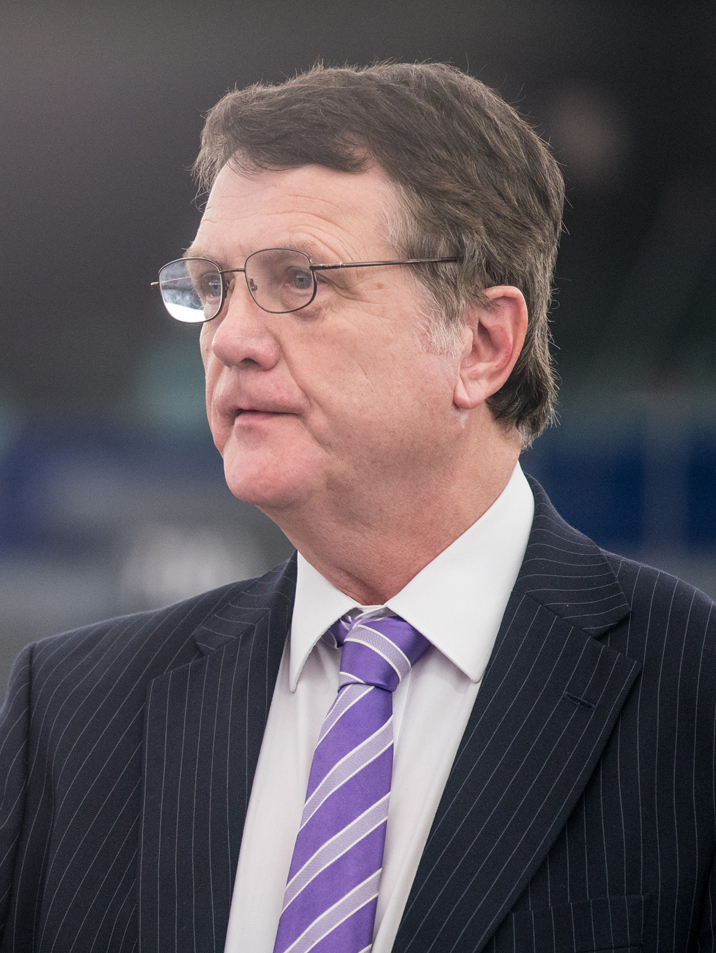
Batten in 2019

=== Election to leadership following the removal of Henry Bolton ===
On 22 January 2018, Batten resigned as UKIP's Brexit spokesman in protest at the party leadership of Henry Bolton; in the process he publicly called for Bolton to stand down from the office, amidst general dissatisfaction amongst a substantial portion of the party's membership with the leader, collapsing membership levels, and ongoing media coverage of Bolton's personal life. Bolton was officially dismissed as party leader on 17 February 2018, after an Extraordinary General Meeting vote by the party membership, and Batten was announced as the Party Leader (on an interim basis) until the conclusion of the next leadership election. During Batten's initial interim leadership term, the party was saved from insolvency and put back on a sound financial footing after an appeal to members raised almost £300,000. The party was also able to pay an outstanding legal bill. In addition, UKIP also saw its first significant membership rise in two years, with over 900 members joining during this time period.

On 14 April 2018, Batten was elected unopposed as the Leader of UKIP. In a statement issued upon his appointment as Leader he said: "I received the backing of all three UKIP Lords, our major donors, our MEPs, our London and Welsh Assembly Members, and party activists and members from all over the UK." Under Batten, UKIP witnessed a resurgence in support during his first six months as Leader. Opinion polls showed UKIP back between six and eight percent of the vote – with one (YouGov) revealing that almost a quarter of 2017 Conservative voters (23%) now considered UKIP to be the best party to handle Brexit, this was almost double the figure it had been in previous polling. Likewise, the proportion of 2017 Conservative voters who think that UKIP would be the best party to handle asylum and immigration had risen from 16% to 28% over the same time period. In addition to good polling, UKIP also saw its membership numbers rise further and reportedly by 15% during the month of July alone, with thousands of new activists joining the ranks of the party. Many of the new members cited Batten's leadership and the perceived mismanagement of Britain's EU Exit by the Conservative Government as major factors in their joining.

=== Online activists join UKIP and appointment of Tommy Robinson ===
In June 2018, Batten attempted to broaden the party's appeal by allowing three controversial online political figures to join the party: Carl Benjamin, Mark Meechan and Paul Joseph Watson. Watson worked for the conspiracist InfoWars website, Benjamin had tweeted that he "would not even rape" Labour politician Jess Phillips and Meechan, known online as "Count Dankula", released a video showing him teaching his girlfriend's dog how to raise its paw in the manner of a Nazi salute, and to react to the phrase "Do you wanna gas the Jews?". The presence of the three led to criticism from antiracist groups.

In November 2018, Batten appointed anti-Islam activist Tommy Robinson as his adviser on matters including 'rape gangs' and prisons. The appointment was strongly criticised by Nigel Farage, who indicated an intention to seek a vote of no confidence in Batten. In response to the appointment, Farage along with many other UKIP MEPs resigned from the party in the following weeks, forcing Batten to withdraw UKIP support for the Europe of Freedom and Direct Democracy alliance with their MEP representation being reduced to 9 from a peak of 24 MEPs in 2014. Farage left saying: "Many UKIP members – including UKIP's NEC – urged that Robinson should not become an advisor to Batten. Sadly, these pleas fell on deaf ears." Farage likened UKIP under Batten to the British National Party. Another MEP, former leader Paul Nuttall left calling the appointment of Robinson "catastrophic".

In January 2019, Farage founded the Brexit Party, and in February, established it in the European Parliament, with nine MEPs who had left UKIP joining the party: himself, Tim Aker, Jonathan Bullock, David Coburn, Bill Etheridge, Nathan Gill, Diane James, Paul Nuttall and Julia Reid.

=== Carl Benjamin comments, electoral wipeout and end of leadership term ===
In April 2019, Batten defended UKIP candidate Carl Benjamin's social media reply in 2016, "I wouldn't even rape you", to the MP Jess Phillips. Philips had written "People talking about raping me isn't fun, but has become somewhat par for the course." Batten stated on BBC One's The Andrew Marr Show that Benjamin's reply was "satire against the people he was saying it about." Three more MEPs left UKIP the following day, defecting to the Brexit Party. One of these, Jane Collins, said "to hear Gerard Batten on national TV yesterday defending this man's use of rape as 'satire' made me sick to my stomach." A second, Jill Seymour, said: "No one person should ever be bigger than a political party but sadly I believe that Mr Batten will be instrumental in its demise."

During an interview on Sky News with Sophy Ridge in May 2019, Batten stated his position as party leader would become "untenable" if he were to lose his seat in the European Parliament. The 2019 European Parliament election later that month resulted in UKIP losing all of its seats, with most of its voting base switching directly to Nigel Farage's recently formed Brexit Party, which won the election.

On 24 May 2019, Mike Hookem resigned as UKIP deputy leader and announced his candidacy in the upcoming UKIP leadership election, criticising Batten's leadership, saying: "Mr Batten's policy direction and associations have given the mainstream media the ammunition to label our party 'extreme' and 'far-right', accusations I do not believe to be true".

Batten's extended term as UKIP leader ended on 2 June 2019, triggering a leadership election. On 27 June 2019, the closing date for nominations, Batten announced that he was standing for re-election to the party's leadership, but on 7 July 2019, UKIP's National Executive Committee passed a motion prohibiting him from doing so on the grounds that 'he had brought the party into disrepute' during his previous tenure in the position.

== Electoral history ==
Batten was the official UKIP candidate standing against Conservative Prime Minister Theresa May in the Maidenhead constituency at the 2017 general election. Out of thirteen candidates, he finished in fifth place with 871 votes, and a 1.5% share of the vote.

General Election 2017: Maidenhead
Party	Candidate	Votes	%	±%
Conservative	Theresa May	37,718	64.8	−1.0
Labour	Pat McDonald	11,261	19.3	+7.4
Liberal Democrats	Tony Hill	6,540	11.2	+1.3
Green	Derek Wall	907	1.6	−2.0
UKIP	Gerard Batten	871	1.5	−6.9
Animal Welfare	Andrew Knight	282	0.5	N/A
Gremloids	Lord Buckethead	249	0.4	N/A
Independent	Grant Smith	152	0.3	N/A
Monster Raving Loony	Howling Laud Hope	119	0.2	N/A
CPA	Edmonds Victor	69	0.1	N/A
The Just Political Party	Julian Reid	52	0.1	N/A
Independent	Yemi Hailemariam	16	0.0	N/A
Give Me Back My Elmo	Bobby Smith	3	0.0	N/A
Majority		26,457	45.5	−8.5
Turnout		58,239	76.4	+3.8
Conservative hold		Swing	−4.2	

In the 2015 general election he stood in Romford, coming second with 22.8% of the vote.

General Election 2015: Romford
Party	Candidate	Votes	%	±%
Conservative	Andrew Rosindell	25,067	51.0	−5.0
UKIP	Gerard Batten	11,208	22.8	+18.4
Labour	Sam Gould	10,268	20.9	+1.4
Liberal Democrats	Ian Sanderson	1,413	2.9	−9.1
Green	Lorna Tooley	1,222	2.5	+1.5
Majority		13,859	28.2	−8.3
Turnout		49,178	67.7	+2.4
Registered electors		72,594		
Conservative hold		Swing	−11.7	

General Election 2010: Romford
Party	Candidate	Votes	%	±%
Conservative	Andrew Rosindell	26,031	56.0	−1.7
Labour	Rachel Voller	9,077	19.5	−9.5
Liberal Democrats	Helen Duffett	5,572	12.0	+3.6
BNP	Robert Bailey	2,438	5.2	+2.2
UKIP	Gerard Batten	2,050	4.4	+2.2
English Democrat	Peter Thorogood	603	1.3	N/A
Green	Gerry Haines	447	1.0	N/A
Independent	Philip Hyde	151	0.3	N/A
Independent	David Sturman	112	0.2	N/A
Majority		16,954	36.5	+4.7
Turnout		46,481	65.3	+3.3
Registered electors		71,306		
Conservative hold		Swing	+3.94	

== Publications ==
- The Inglorious Revolution: The Subversion of the English Constitution and the Path to Freedom (2013)
- The Road to Freedom: How Britain Can Escape the E.U. (2014)
- Henry VIII, Tudor Serial Killer: His Victims and Their Stories (2014)

== Notes ==
Party political offices
Preceded by Henry Bolton	Leader of the UK Independence Party; 2018–2019	Succeeded by Richard Braine
