= Freddy Vachha =

Former Leader of the UK Independence Party

Leader of the UK Independence Party
- In office 22 June 2020 – 12 September 2020
- Deputy: Pat Mountain
- Preceded by: Richard Braine
- Succeeded by: Neil Hamilton

Personal details
- Born: Freddy Vachha; December 1957 (age 68) Bombay, Maharashtra, India
- Party: UK Independence Party (2008–2021)
- Education: City of London Polytechnic; St. Xavier's College, University of Bombay

Freddy Vachha is a British businessman and a retired academic and politician who served as Leader of the UK Independence Party from June to September 2020.

== Early life ==
Freddy Vachha was born in Bombay, India, in December 1957. After graduating, with First Class Honours, in Physics and Mathematics, he worked as a school-teacher at Cathedral and John Connon School, lecturer at Agrawal Classes for IIT JEE, and tutor in mathematics and physics. Between 1980 and 1981, he studied accounting and obtained a Diploma in Accountancy, First Class with Distinction, from the predecessor institution to London Guildhall University. From 1981 to 1984, he worked at the accounting firm Ernst & Whinney, the predecessor to Ernst & Young, and continued as a consultant there for several years. He then ran his own computer software company Digital Precision Ltd, developing and publishing software for the Sinclair QL and other computers until 1995, and worked as a business consultant. A former member of Mensa, he was its UK Chess Champion several times.

Vachha has Indian Anglo-Parsi heritage.

== Political career ==
Vachha was the UKIP candidate for Chingford and Woodford Green in the 2015 general election, standing against Iain Duncan Smith who was serving as Secretary of State for Work and Pensions at the time and coming third, behind the Labour Party UK candidate. During a hustings event, citing Hansard he said that inter-community relations in Palestine suffered because of mass immigration during the first half of the 20th century.

Vachha was a candidate for the 2016 London Assembly election in the North East constituency He stood as a candidate in Old Bexley and Sidcup in the 2017 general election, coming third, again behind the Conservatives' James Brokenshire and Labour. He competed for one of London's seats in the 2019 European Parliament election but was not elected. In the same year, he ran for UKIP leader in that year's leadership election and came second to Richard Braine. He took over the party's national campaign for the 2019 general election.

He was elected unopposed as leader of UKIP in June 2020, saying that the party "went astray quite a few years ago" and that under his leadership he hoped it would "return to our libertarian freedom-loving principles". On 12 September 2020, it was reported that Vachha had been suspended from the party by the party chairman Ben Walker and that Neil Hamilton had been installed as interim leader. Vachha maintained that he was still the Leader and Walker was no longer the Chairman. Vachha instituted legal action at the High Court that month. In December 2020, a judge refused the request to fast-track the case. Vachha, potentially facing a year's delay on the High Court Chancery List backlogged due to the COVID-19 pandemic, then discontinued the action, stating in a press release of December 1, 2020 that long before the case would get heard, the party would be effectively defunct. In April 2021, the party published Vachha's statement of disassociation from UKIP, signed also by "Marietta King, Former Party Chairman" which said that due to many changes to the party's "ethos" and in its "senior office-holders", Vachha and King "feel unable to continue our association with UKIP". It confirmed that on "April 14, 2021, Freddy has stood down from his position as Party Leader and Marietta from her position as Party Chairman."
