= Leadership approval opinion polling for the 2019 United Kingdom general election =

At various dates in the run-up to the 2019 United Kingdom general election, various organisations carried out opinion polling to gauge the opinions that voters held about various politicians. Results of such polls are displayed in this article. Most of the polling companies listed are members of the British Polling Council (BPC) and abide by its disclosure rules.

The date range for these opinion polls extended from the previous general election, held on 8 June 2017, to the present day. Under the Fixed-term Parliaments Act 2011, the next general election was scheduled to be held no later than 5 May 2022, and it was accelerated from that timetable by the Early Parliamentary General Election Act 2019, with the result that polling day fell on 12 December 2019.

== Leadership approval ratings ==
=== Boris Johnson ===
The following polls asked about voters' opinions on Boris Johnson, Leader of the Conservatives and Prime Minister of the United Kingdom.

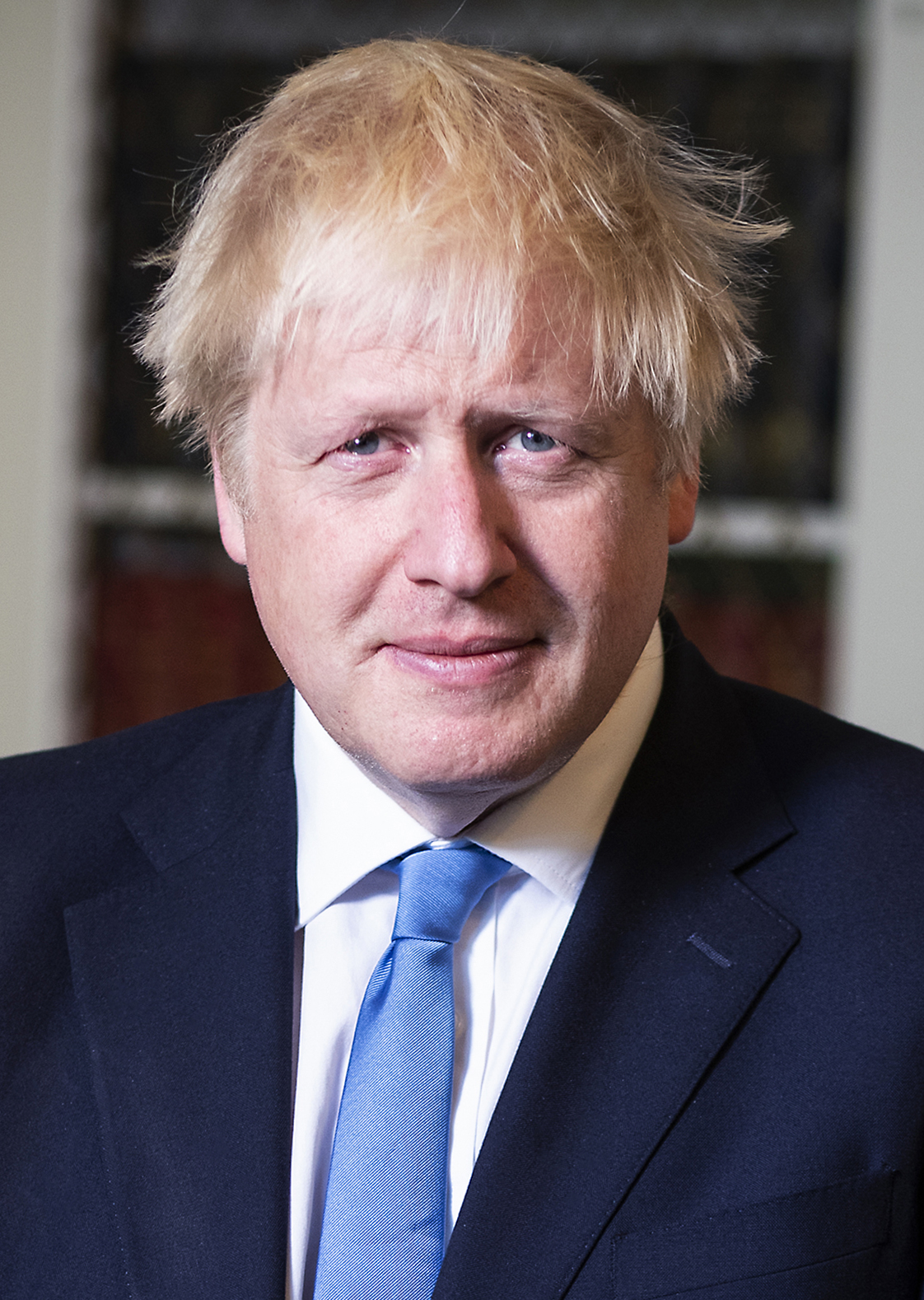
Boris Johnson, Prime Minister and Leader of the Conservative Party

2019
Date(s) conducted	Polling organisation/client	Sample size	Question wording	Approve	Disapprove	Neither	Don't know	Net approval
10-11 Dec	YouGov	1,628	Approve/Disapprove^{[a]}	40%	52%	—N/a	8%	–12%
10-11 Dec	Opinium	3,005	Well/Badly (Note: Question asked in polls: "For each of the following party leaders, do you think they are doing very well in their job, quite well, quite badly or very badly?")	33%	47%	—N/a	20%	–14%
5-7 Dec	Deltapoll	1,533	Well/Badly	45%	48%	—N/a	7%	–3%
5-6 Dec	YouGov	1,680	Approve/Disapprove^{[a]}	38%	51%	—N/a	11%	–13%
2–4 Dec	Ipsos MORI	1,545	Approve/Disapprove^{[a]}	36%	56%	—N/a	9%	–20%
28–30 Nov	Deltapoll	1,528	Well/Badly	49%	47%	—N/a	4%	+2%
27–29 Nov	Opinium	2,018	Approve/Disapprove^{[a]}	38%	39%	—N/a	23%	–1%
27–28 Nov	Panelbase	2,010	Approve/Disapprove^{[a]}	36%	43%	17%	4%	–3%
21–23 Nov	Deltapoll	1,519	Well/Badly	42%	52%	—N/a	6%	–10%
21-22 Nov	YouGov	1,677	Approve/Disapprove^{[a]}	43%	47%	—N/a	10%	–4%
14–16 Nov	Deltapoll	1,526	Well/Badly	49%	45%	—N/a	6%	+4%
13–14 Nov	Panelbase	1,021	Approve/Disapprove^{[a]}	39%	42%	16%	3%	–3%
11–12 Nov	YouGov	1,619	Approve/Disapprove^{[a]}	43%	49%	—N/a	8%	–6%
6–8 Nov	Panelbase	1,046	Well/Badly	38%	41%	17%	4%	–3%
6–8 Nov	Deltapoll	1,518	Well/Badly	45%	50%	—N/a	5%	–5%
31 Oct – 2 Nov	Deltapoll	1,500	Well/Badly	48%	46%	—N/a	6%	+2%
30 Oct – 1 Nov	Opinium	2,004	Approve/Disapprove^{[a]}	39%	42%	—N/a	19%	–3%
30–31 Oct	Panelbase	1,001	Approve/Disapprove^{[a]}	38%	42%	17%	3%	–4%
25–28 Oct	Ipsos MORI	1,007	Approve/Disapprove^{[a]}	46%	44%	—N/a	10%	+2%
23–25 Oct	Opinium	2,001	Approve/Disapprove^{[a]}	40%	38%	—N/a	22%	+2%
15–17 Oct	Opinium	2,001	Approve/Disapprove^{[a]}	40%	41%	—N/a	19%	–1%
9–11 Oct	Panelbase	2,013	Approve/Disapprove^{[a]}	33%	43%	16%	6%	–10%
3–4 Oct	Opinium	2,006	Approve/Disapprove^{[a]}	37%	43%	—N/a	20%	–6%
26–27 Sep	YouGov	1,623	Approve/Disapprove^{[a]}	33%	56%	—N/a	12%	–23%
25–27 Sep	Opinium	2,007	Approve/Disapprove^{[a]}	34%	47%	—N/a	19%	–13%
16–17 Sep	YouGov	1,533	Well/Badly	38%	54%	—N/a	8%	–16%
13–16 Sep	Ipsos MORI	1,006	Approve/Disapprove^{[a]}	36%	55%	—N/a	9%	–18%
29–31 Aug	Deltapoll	2,028	Well/Badly	48%	42%	—N/a	10%	+6%
29–30 Aug	Survation	1,020	Approve/Disapprove^{[a]}	41%	35%	—N/a	24%	+6%
28–29 Aug	YouGov	1,867	Approve/Disapprove^{[a]}	38%	44%	—N/a	18%	–6%
21–23 Aug	Opinium	2,005	Approve/Disapprove^{[a]}	41%	36%	—N/a	23%	+5%
8–9 Aug	Opinium	2,001	Approve/Disapprove^{[a]}	40%	34%	—N/a	26%	+6%
26–30 Jul	Ipsos MORI	1,007	Approve/Disapprove^{[a]}	31%	38%	—N/a	31%	–7%
25–27 Jul	Deltapoll	2,001	Well/Badly	38%	32%	—N/a	30%	+6%
25–26 Jul	YouGov	1,697	Approve/Disapprove^{[a]}	34%	55%	—N/a	12%	–21%
24–26 Jul	Opinium	2,006	Approve/Disapprove^{[a]}	28%	31%	—N/a	41%	–3%
21–22 Jul	YouGov	1,655	Approve/Disapprove^{[a]}	31%	58%	—N/a	11%	–27%

=== Jeremy Corbyn ===
The following polls asked about voters' opinions on Jeremy Corbyn, Leader of the Labour Party and Leader of the Opposition.

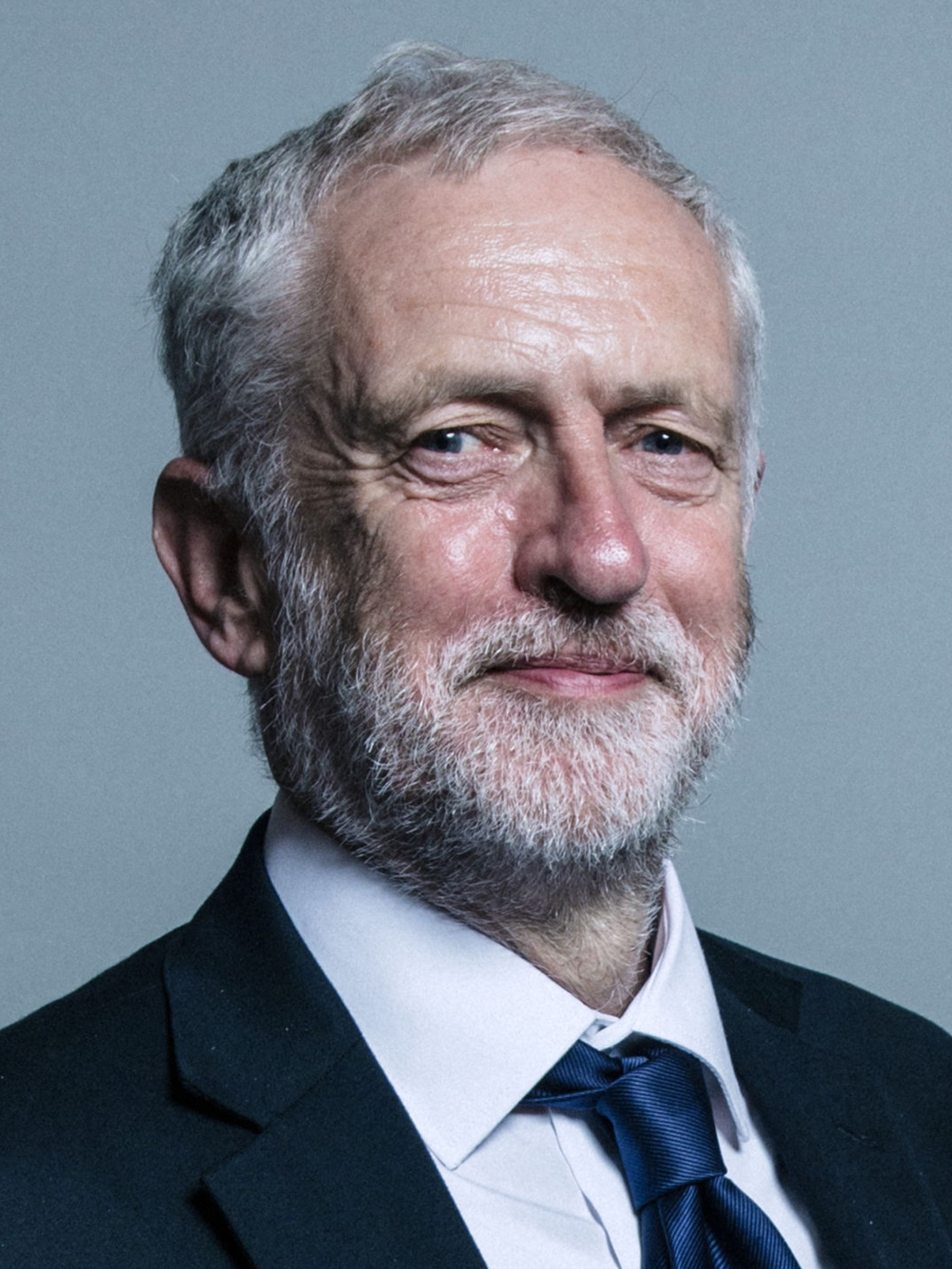
Jeremy Corbyn, Leader of the Opposition and Leader of the Labour Party

==== 2019 ====
Date(s) conducted	Polling organisation/client	Sample size	Question wording	Approve	Disapprove	Neither	Don't know	Net approval
10-11 Dec	YouGov	1,628	Approve/Disapprove^{[a]}	32%	59%	—N/a	8%	–27%
10-11 Dec	Opinium	3,005	Well/Badly	24%	54%	—N/a	22%	–30%
5-7 Dec	Deltapoll	1,533	Well/Badly	28%	65%	—N/a	7%	–37%
5-6 Dec	YouGov	1,680	Approve/Disapprove^{[a]}	22%	69%	—N/a	9%	–47%
2–4 Dec	Ipsos MORI	1,545	Approve/Disapprove^{[a]}	24%	68%	—N/a	6%	–44%
28-30 Nov	Deltapoll	1,528	Well/Badly	27%	66%	—N/a	7%	–39%
27–29 Nov	Opinium	2,018	Approve/Disapprove^{[a]}	24%	55%	—N/a	21%	–31%
27-28 Nov	Panelbase	2,010	Approve/Disapprove^{[a]}	22%	58%	15%	5%	–36%
21-23 Nov	Deltapoll	1,519	Well/Badly	30%	64%	—N/a	6%	–34%
21-22 Nov	YouGov	1,677	Approve/Disapprove^{[a]}	23%	65%	—N/a	12%	–42%
14-16 Nov	Deltapoll	1,526	Well/Badly	25%	68%	—N/a	7%	–43%
13-14 Nov	Panelbase	1,021	Approve/Disapprove^{[a]}	19%	61%	15%	5%	–42%
11-12 Nov	YouGov	1,619	Approve/Disapprove^{[a]}	24%	66%	—N/a	10%	–42%
6–8 Nov	Panelbase	1,046	Well/Badly	20%	59%	16%	5%	–39%
6–8 Nov	Deltapoll	1,518	Well/Badly	22%	70%	—N/a	8%	–48%
31 Oct–2 Nov	Deltapoll	1,500	Well/Badly	25%	68%	—N/a	7%	–43%
30 Oct–1 Nov	Opinium	2,004	Approve/Disapprove^{[a]}	19%	59%	—N/a	22%	–40%
30–31 Oct	Panelbase	1,001	Approve/Disapprove^{[a]}	20%	61%	15%	4%	–41%
25-28 Oct	Ipsos MORI	1,007	Approve/Disapprove^{[a]}	15%	75%	—N/a	10%	–60%
23-25 Oct	Opinium	2,001	Approve/Disapprove^{[a]}	20%	60%	—N/a	20%	–40%
15-17 Oct	Opinium	2,001	Approve/Disapprove^{[a]}	20%	56%	—N/a	24%	–36%
9–11 Oct	Panelbase	2,013	Approve/Disapprove^{[a]}	20%	58%	15%	7%	–38%
3–4 Oct	Opinium	2,006	Approve/Disapprove^{[a]}	20%	58%	—N/a	22%	–38%
26–27 Sep	YouGov	1,623	Approve/Disapprove^{[a]}	16%	71%	—N/a	13%	–55%
25–27 Sep	Opinium	2,007	Approve/Disapprove^{[a]}	21%	58%	—N/a	21%	–37%
16–17 Sep	YouGov	1,533	Well/Badly	21%	70%	—N/a	9%	–49%
13–16 Sep	Ipsos MORI	1,006	Satisfied/Dissatisfied (Note: Questions asked in polls: "Are you satisfied or dissatisfied with the way Jeremy Corbyn is doing his job as leader of the Labour Party? / Are you satisfied or dissatisfied with the way Theresa May is doing her job as Prime Minister?")	16%	76%	—N/a	8%	–60%
29–31 Aug	Deltapoll	2,028	Well/Badly	23%	68%	—N/a	9%	–45%
28–29 Aug	YouGov	1,867	Approve/Disapprove^{[a]}	13%	72%	—N/a	15%	–59%
21–23 Aug	Opinium	2,005	Approve/Disapprove^{[a]}	18%	60%	—N/a	21%	–42%
8–9 Aug	Opinium	2,001	Approve/Disapprove^{[a]}	20%	60%	—N/a	20%	–40%
26–30 Jul	Ipsos MORI	1,007	Approve/Disapprove^{[a]}	19%	69%	—N/a	12%	–50%
25-27 Jul	Deltapoll	2,001	Well/Badly	23%	67%	—N/a	10%	–44%
24–26 Jul	Opinium	2,006	Approve/Disapprove^{[a]}	19%	59%	—N/a	22%	–40%
3–5 July	Opinium	2,002	Approve/Disapprove^{[a]}	18%	64%	19%	—N/a	–46%
19–20 June	Opinium	1,953	Approve/Disapprove^{[a]}	18%	63%	19%	—N/a	–45%
28–30 May	Opinium	1,949	Approve/Disapprove^{[a]}	18%	59%	23%	—N/a	–41%
17–20 May	Opinium	2,005	Approve/Disapprove^{[a]}	16%	64%	20%	—N/a	–48%
14–15 May	YouGov	1,765	Well/Badly (Note: Questions asked in polls: "Do you have a favourable or unfavourable opinion of Theresa May?" and "Do you have a favourable or unfavourable opinion of Jeremy Corbyn?")	19%	69%	—N/a	12%	–50%
8–10 May	Opinium	2,004	Approve/Disapprove^{[a]}	19%	61%	20%	—N/a	–42%
9–12 Apr	Opinium	1,951	Satisfied/Dissatisfied (Note: Questions asked in polls: "To what extent do you approve or disapprove of…" (1) "The way Theresa May is handling her job as Prime Minister"; (2) "The way Jeremy Corbyn is handling his job as Leader of the Labour Party"; (3) "The way Vince Cable is handling his job as Leader of the Liberal Democrats"; (4) "The way Henry Bolton is handling his job as Leader of the UK Independence Party")	22%	55%	—N/a	23%	–33%
28–29 Mar	Opinium	2,008	Satisfied/Dissatisfied	18%	61%	—N/a	21%	–43%
24 Mar	YouGov	1,700	Favourable/Unfavourable	18%	71%	—N/a	15%	–49%
20–22 Mar	Opinium/The Observer	2,002	Satisfied/Dissatisfied	21%	60%	—N/a	19%	–39%
1–5 Mar	Ipsos MORI	1,005	Satisfied/Dissatisfied	20%	70%	—N/a	10%	–50%
12–15 Mar	Opinium	2,008	Approve/Disapprove	20%	58%	22%	—N/a	–38%
26 Feb – 1 Mar	Opinium	1,948	Approve/Disapprove	23%	60%	17%	—N/a	–37%
21–23 Feb	Deltapoll	1,027	Well/Badly	26%	64%	—N/a	10%	–38%
20–22 Feb	Opinium	2,008	Approve/Disapprove	22%	58%	20%	—N/a	–36%
13–15 Feb	Opinium	2,005	Approve/Disapprove	25%	52%	23%	—N/a	–27%
8–11 Feb	Deltapoll	2,004	Well/Badly	30%	58%	—N/a	12%	–28%
4–8 Feb	BMG Research	2,005	Satisfied/Dissatisfied (Note: Questions asked in polls: "Are you satisfied or dissatisfied with the way Jeremy Corbyn is doing his job as leader of the Opposition? / Are you satisfied or dissatisfied with the way Theresa May is doing her job as Prime Minister?")	23%	59%	—N/a	12%	–36%
1–5 Feb	Ipsos MORI	TBA	Satisfied/Dissatisfied	17%	72%	11%	—N/a	–55%
30 Jan – 1 Feb	Opinium	2,008	Approve/Disapprove	22%	54%	24%	—N/a	–32%
30 Jan	YouGov	TBC	Favourable/Unfavourable	22%	67%	11%	—N/a	–45%
16–18 Jan	Opinium	2,007	Approve/Disapprove	24%	54%	21%	—N/a	–30%

==== 2018 ====
Date(s) conducted	Polling organisation/client	Sample size	Question wording	Approve	Disapprove	Neither	Don't know	Net approval
18–19 Dec	YouGov	1,675	Well/Badly	19%	62%	—N/a	18%	–43%
13–14 Dec	Deltapoll	2,022	Well/Badly	38%	54%	—N/a	8%	–16%
13–14 Dec	Opinium	2,016	Approve/Disapprove	26%	50%	25%	—N/a	–24%
30 Nov – 5 Dec	Ipsos MORI	1,049	Satisfied/Dissatisfied	29%	59%	—N/a	14%	–32%
14 Nov	Opinium	1,948	Approve/Disapprove	26%	50%	24%	—N/a	–24%
19–22 Oct	Ipsos MORI	1,044	Satisfied/Dissatisfied	28%	59%	—N/a	14%	–31%
11 Oct	Opinium	2,010	Approve/Disapprove	28%	48%	24%	—N/a	–20%
3–5 Oct	Opinium	2,007	Approve/Disapprove	29%	49%	23%	—N/a	–20%
30 Sep – 1 Oct	YouGov	1,607	Well/Badly	30%	58%	—N/a	13%	–28%
18–20 Sep	Opinium	2,003	Approve/Disapprove	27%	48%	25%	—N/a	–21%
11 Sep	Opinium	2,011	Approve/Disapprove	27%	49%	24%	—N/a	–22%
31 Aug – 1 Sep	Survation	1,017	Favourable/Unfavourable	32%	46%	18%	3%	–14%
14–16 Aug	Deltapoll	1,904	Well/Badly	27%	62%	—N/a	12%	–35%
14 Aug	Opinium	2,003	Approve/Disapprove	25%	49%	36%	—N/a	–24%
19–20 Jul	YouGov	1,668	Well/Badly	27%	59%	—N/a	14%	–32%
12–14 Jul	Deltapoll	1,484	Well/Badly	35%	52%	—N/a	12%	–17%
10–13 Jul	Opinium	2,005	Approve/Disapprove	31%	43%	26%	—N/a	–12%
10–11 Jul	YouGov	1,732	Favourable/Unfavourable	28%	58%	—N/a	14%	–30%
22–27 Jun	Ipsos Mori	1,026	Satisfied/Dissatisfied	31%	57%	—N/a	12%	–26%
5–7 Jun	Opinium	2,005	Approve/Disapprove	31%	44%	25%	—N/a	–13%
18–22 May	Ipsos MORI	1,015	Satisfied/Dissatisfied	32%	59%	—N/a	12%	–24%
15–16 May	Opinium	2,009	Approve/Disapprove	29%	47%	24%	—N/a	–18%
1–2 May	YouGov	1,675	Favourable/Unfavourable	31%	57%	—N/a	13%	–26%
20–24 Apr	Ipsos MORI	1,004	Satisfied/Dissatisfied	32%	59%	—N/a	10%	–27%
16–17 Apr	YouGov	1,631	Favourable/Unfavourable	32%	56%	—N/a	13%	–24%
10–12 Apr	Opinium	2,008	Approve/Disapprove	29%	48%	23%	—N/a	–19%
4–6 Apr	YouGov	3,298	Favourable/Unfavourable	31%	54%	—N/a	14%	–23%
4–5 Apr	YouGov	1,662	Well/Badly	31%	56%	—N/a	14%	–25%
18–19 Mar	YouGov	1,845	Favourable/Unfavourable	34%	53%	—N/a	13%	–19%
13–15 Mar	Opinium	2,001	Approve/Disapprove	32%	42%	27%	—N/a	–10%
2–7 Mar	Ipsos MORI	1,012	Satisfied/Dissatisfied	37%	52%	—N/a	10%	–15%
6–9 Feb	BMG Research	1,507	Satisfied/Dissatisfied	34%	43%	—N/a	24%	–11%
6–8 Feb	Opinium	2,002	Approve/Disapprove	33%	40%	21%	—N/a	–7%
19–23 Jan	Ipsos MORI	1,031	Satisfied/Dissatisfied	38%	49%	—N/a	14%	–11%
11–12 Jan	Opinium	2,008	Approve/Disapprove	31%	41%	28%	—N/a	–10%
9–12 Jan	BMG Research	1,513	Satisfied/Dissatisfied	35%	41%	—N/a	24%	–6%

==== 2017 ====
Date(s) conducted	Polling organisation/client	Sample size	Question wording	Approve	Disapprove	Neither	Don't know	Net approval
19–20 Dec	YouGov	1,610	Well/Badly (Note: Question asked in polls: "Do you think that Theresa May is doing well or badly as Prime Minister? / Do you think that Jeremy Corbyn is doing well or badly as Leader of the Labour Party? / Do you think Nicola Sturgeon is doing well or badly as First Minister? / Do you think that Ruth Davidson is doing well or badly as leader of the Scottish Conservative party?")	45%	37%	—N/a	18%	+8%
12–14 Dec	ICM Research	2,004	Good job/Bad job (Note: Questions asked in polls: "From what you have seen or heard, do you think... has done a good job or a bad job?" (1) "The Prime Minister Theresa May"; (2) "The leader of the opposition Jeremy Corbyn")	40%	42%	—N/a	18%	–2%
12–14 Dec	Opinium	2,005	Approve/Disapprove	35%	39%	26%	—N/a	–4%
5–8 Dec	BMG Research	1,509	Satisfied/Dissatisfied	35%	44%	—N/a	22%	–9%
29 Nov – 1 Dec	ICM Research	2,050	Good job/Bad job	41%	38%	—N/a	20%	+3%
24–28 Nov	Ipsos MORI	1,003	Satisfied/Dissatisfied	42%	49%	—N/a	9%	–7%
14–17 Nov	BMG Research	1,507	Satisfied/Dissatisfied	36%	42%	—N/a	22%	–6%
14–16 Nov	Opinium	2,003	Approve/Disapprove	36%	39%	25%	—N/a	–3%
9–10 Nov	YouGov	1,644	Favourable/Unfavourable	38%	48%	—N/a	—N/a	–10%
7–8 Nov	YouGov / The Times	2,012	Well/Badly	44%	39%	—N/a	21%	+5%
27 Oct – 1 Nov	Ipsos MORI	1,052	Satisfied/Dissatisfied	42%	45%	—N/a	14%	–3%
20–23 Oct	ICM/The Guardian	2,022	Good job/Bad job	37%	43%	—N/a	20%	–6%
17–20 Oct	BMG Research	1,506	Satisfied/Dissatisfied	35%	44%	—N/a	21%	–9%
4–6 Oct	Opinium/Observer	2,009	Approve/Disapprove	35%	40%	25%	—N/a	–5%
26–29 Sep	BMG/The Independent	1,910	Satisfied/Dissatisfied	40%	39%	—N/a	21%	+1%
19–22 Sep	Opinium/Observer	2,004	Approve/Disapprove	32%	42%	26%	—N/a	–10%
15–18 Sep	Ipsos MORI	1,023	Satisfied/Dissatisfied	43%	46%	—N/a	10%	–3%
12–15 Sep	BMG Research	1,447	Satisfied/Dissatisfied	34%	42%	—N/a	23%	–6%
12–15 Sep	Opinium/Observer	2,009	Approve/Disapprove	33%	40%	27%	—N/a	–7%
4–5 Sep	YouGov	1,644	Favourable/Unfavourable	36%	50%	—N/a	13%	–14%
15–18 Aug	Opinium/Observer	2,006	Approve/Disapprove	35%	40%	25%	—N/a	–5%
15–16 Aug	YouGov	1,697	Favourable/Unfavourable	38%	51%	—N/a	11%	–13%
8–11 Aug	BMG/The Independent	1,512	Satisfied/Dissatisfied	40%	38%	—N/a	22%	+2%
14–18 Jul	Ipsos MORI	1,071	Satisfied/Dissatisfied	44%	45%	—N/a	11%	–1%
11–14 Jul	BMG/The Independent	1,518	Satisfied/Dissatisfied	41%	39%	20%	—N/a	+2%
11–14 Jul	Opinium/Observer	2,013	Approve/Disapprove	41%	37%	22%	—N/a	+4%
30 Jun – 3 Jul	ICM/The Guardian	2,044	Good job/Bad job	44%	35%	—N/a	21%	+9%
27–29 Jun	Opinium/Observer	2,010	Approve/Disapprove	42%	38%	20%	—N/a	+4%
16–21 Jun	Panelbase/Sunday Times	5,481	Good job/Bad job (Note: Questions asked in polls: "How good or bad a job do you think Theresa May, Conservative Party leader is doing?" and "How good or bad a job do you think Jeremy Corbyn, Labour Party leader is doing?")	45%	28%	27%	—N/a	+17%
11–12 Jun	YouGov	1,729	Favourable/Unfavourable	46%	46%	—N/a	8%	0%

=== Jo Swinson ===
The following polls asked about voters' opinions on Jo Swinson, Leader of the Liberal Democrats.

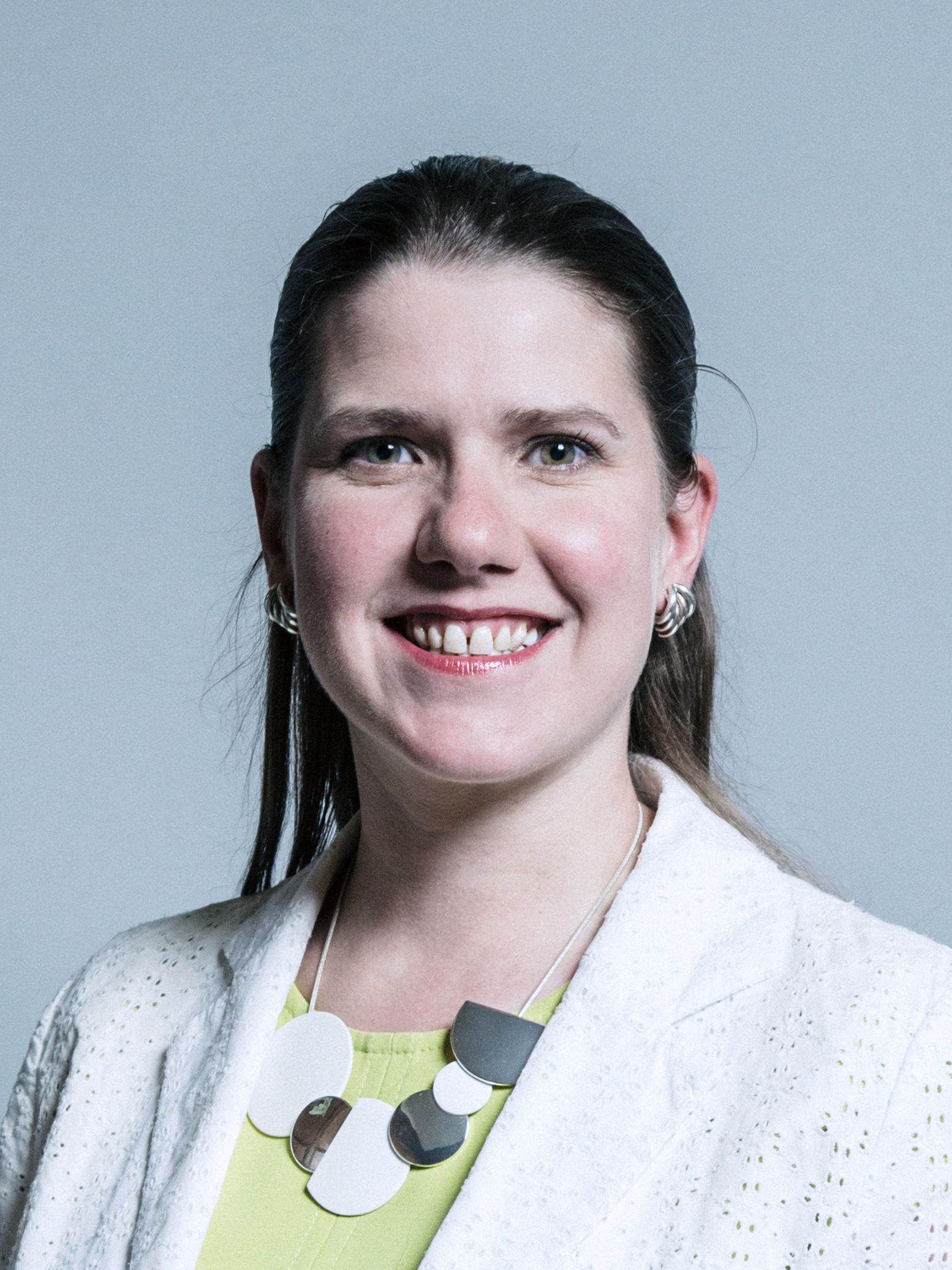
Jo Swinson, Leader of the Liberal Democrats

2019 polling
Date(s) conducted	Polling organisation/client	Sample size	Question wording	Approve	Disapprove	Neither	Don't know	Net approval
10-11 Dec	YouGov	1,628	Approve/Disapprove^{[a]}	24%	55%	—N/a	21%	–31%
5-7 Dec	Deltapoll	1,533	Well/Badly	24%	58%	—N/a	18%	–34%
5-6 Dec	YouGov	1,680	Approve/Disapprove^{[a]}	21%	57%	—N/a	22%	–36%
2–4 Dec	Ipsos MORI	1,545	Approve/Disapprove^{[a]}	29%	51%	—N/a	20%	–22%
28-30 Nov	Deltapoll	1,528	Well/Badly	30%	54%	—N/a	16%	–24%
27–29 Nov	Opinium	2,018	Approve/Disapprove^{[a]}	21%	44%	—N/a	35%	–23%
27-28 Nov	Panelbase	2,010	Approve/Disapprove^{[a]}	18%	44%	27%	11%	–26%
21-23 Nov	Deltapoll	1,519	Well/Badly	30%	52%	—N/a	18%	–22%
21-22 Nov	YouGov	1,677	Approve/Disapprove^{[a]}	27%	45%	—N/a	27%	–18%
14-16 Nov	Deltapoll	1,526	Well/Badly	28%	51%	—N/a	21%	–23%
13-14 Nov	Panelbase	1,021	Approve/Disapprove^{[a]}	22%	39%	26%	13%	–17%
11-12 Nov	YouGov	1,619	Approve/Disapprove^{[a]}	24%	48%	—N/a	28%	–24%
6–8 Nov	Panelbase	1,046	Well/Badly	22%	39%	27%	12%	–17%
6–8 Nov	Deltapoll	1,518	Well/Badly	34%	43%	—N/a	23%	–9%
31 Oct-2 Nov	Deltapoll	1,500	Well/Badly	31%	43%	—N/a	26%	–12%
30 Oct–1 Nov	Opinium	2,004	Approve/Disapprove^{[a]}	23%	39%	—N/a	38%	–16%
30–31 Oct	Panelbase	1,001	Approve/Disapprove^{[a]}	23%	39%	25%	13%	–16%
25-28 Oct	Ipsos MORI	1,007	Approve/Disapprove^{[a]}	29%	41%	—N/a	30%	–12%
23-25 Oct	Opinium	2,001	Approve/Disapprove^{[a]}	22%	40%	—N/a	38%	–18%
15-17 Oct	Opinium	2,001	Approve/Disapprove^{[a]}	24%	35%	—N/a	41%	–11%
9–11 Oct	Panelbase	2,013	Approve/Disapprove^{[a]}	24%	34%	27%	15%	–10%
3–4 Oct	Opinium	2,006	Approve/Disapprove^{[a]}	21%	37%	—N/a	42%	–16%
25-27 Sep	Opinium	2,007	Approve/Disapprove^{[a]}	25%	37%	—N/a	38%	–12%
16–17 Sep	YouGov	1,533	Well/Badly	26%	38%	—N/a	36%	–12%
13–16 Sep	Ipsos MORI	1,006	Satisfied/Dissatisfied^{[a]}	35%	40%	—N/a	25%	–5%
29–31 Aug	Deltapoll	2,028	Well/Badly	30%	35%	—N/a	35%	–5%
26-27 Aug	YouGov		Well/Badly	17%	35%	—N/a	47%	–18%
21–23 Aug	Opinium	2,005	Approve/Disapprove^{[a]}	20%	31%	—N/a	49%	–11%
8–9 Aug	Opinium	2,001	Approve/Disapprove^{[a]}	21%	30%	—N/a	49%	–9%
26–30 Jul	Ipsos MORI	1,007	Satisfied/Dissatisfied^{[a]}	28%	28%	—N/a	44%	Tie
25-27 Jul	Deltapoll	2,001	Well/Badly	27%	26%	—N/a	47%	+1%
24–26 Jul	Opinium	2,006	Approve/Disapprove^{[a]}	21%	24%	—N/a	55%	–3%

=== Nigel Farage ===
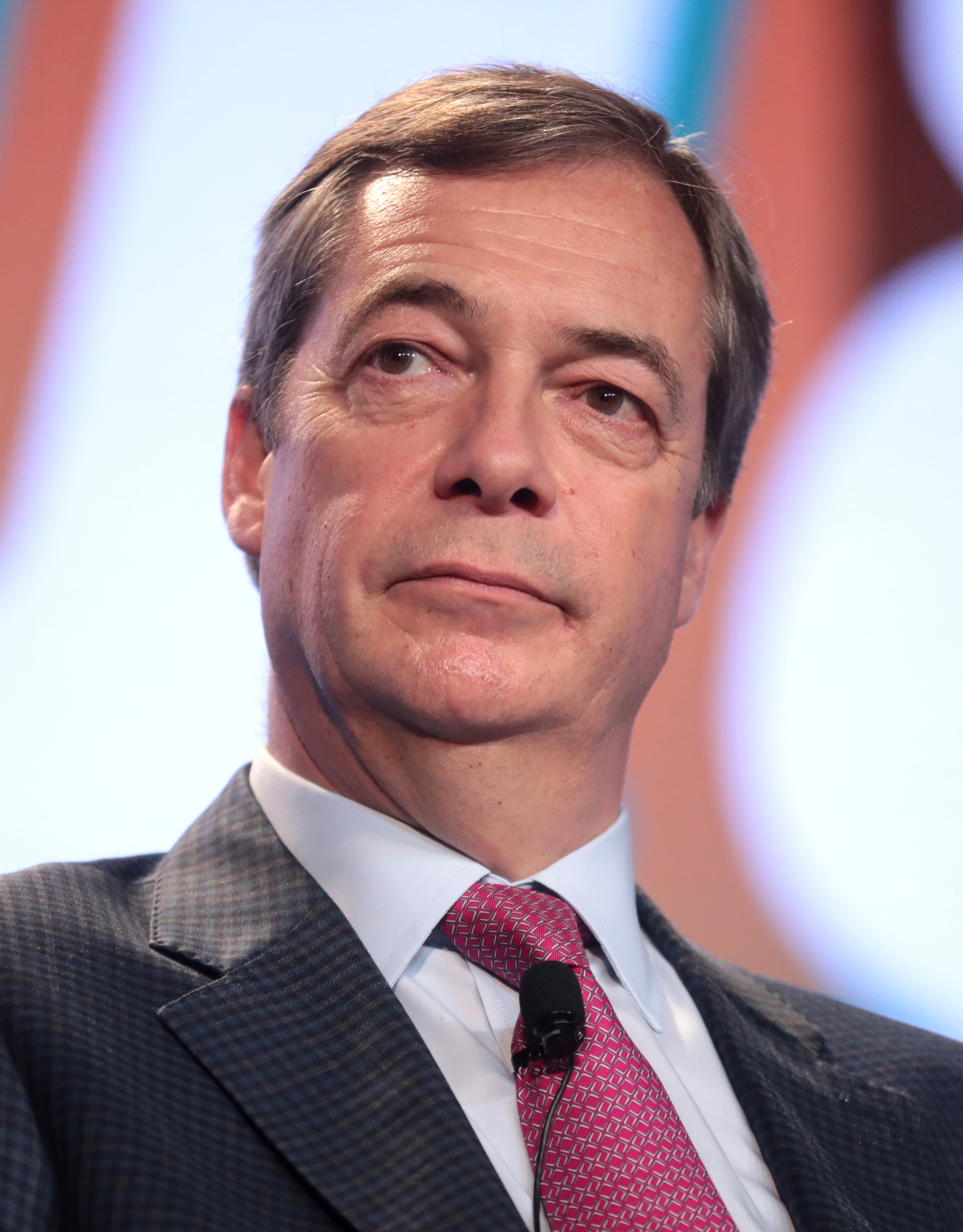
Nigel Farage, Leader of the Brexit Party

The following polls asked about voters' opinions on Nigel Farage, Leader of the Brexit Party since 22 March 2019.

==== 2019 ====
Date(s) conducted	Polling organisation/client	Sample size	Question wording	Approve	Disapprove	Neither	Don't know	Net approval
10-11 Dec	YouGov	1,628	Approve/Disapprove^{[a]}	27%	63%	—N/a	10%	–36%
5-7 Dec	Deltapoll	1,533	Well/Badly	32%	54%	—N/a	14%	–22%
2–4 Dec	Ipsos MORI	1,545	Approve/Disapprove^{[a]}	30%	56%	—N/a	14%	–26%
28-30 Nov	Deltapoll	1,528	Well/Badly	35%	58%	—N/a	7%	–23%
27–29 Nov	Opinium	2,018	Approve/Disapprove^{[a]}	22%	44%	—N/a	34%	–22%
27-28 Nov	Panelbase	2,010	Approve/Disapprove^{[a]}	22%	46%	28%	8%	–24%
21-23 Nov	Deltapoll	1,519	Well/Badly	31%	60%	—N/a	9%	–29%
14-16 Nov	Deltapoll	1,526	Well/Badly	35%	53%	—N/a	12%	–18%
13-14 Nov	Panelbase	1,021	Approve/Disapprove^{[a]}	25%	46%	22%	7%	–21%
11-12 Nov	YouGov	1,619	Approve/Disapprove^{[a]}	27%	62%	—N/a	11%	–35%
6–8 Nov	Panelbase	1,046	Well/Badly	20%	48%	25%	7%	–28%
6–8 Nov	Deltapoll	1,518	Well/Badly	30%	57%	—N/a	13%	–27%
30 Oct–1 Nov	Opinium	2,004	Approve/Disapprove^{[a]}	24%	42%	—N/a	34%	–18%
30–31 Oct	Panelbase	1,001	Approve/Disapprove^{[a]}	25%	45%	23%	7%	–20%
25-28 Oct	Ipsos MORI	1,007	Approve/Disapprove^{[a]}	29%	51%	—N/a	20%	–22%
23-25 Oct	Opinium	2,001	Approve/Disapprove^{[a]}	27%	40%	—N/a	33%	–13%
15-17 Oct	Opinium	2,001	Approve/Disapprove^{[a]}	29%	41%	—N/a	30%	–12%
9–11 Oct	Panelbase	2,013	Approve/Disapprove^{[a]}	26%	42%	25%	9%	–16%
3–4 Oct	Opinium	2,006	Approve/Disapprove^{[a]}	28%	40%	—N/a	42%	–12%
25-27 Sep	Opinium	2,007	Approve/Disapprove^{[a]}	27%	39%	—N/a	34%	–12%
21–23 Aug	Opinium	2,005	Approve/Disapprove^{[a]}	30%	41%	—N/a	29%	–11%
8–9 Aug	Opinium	2,001	Approve/Disapprove^{[a]}	32%	39%	—N/a	29%	–7%
26–30 Jul	Ipsos MORI	1,007	Approve/Disapprove^{[a]}	32%	53%	—N/a	15%	–21%
24–26 Jul	Opinium	2,006	Approve/Disapprove^{[a]}	31%	39%	—N/a	30%	–8%
3–5 July	Opinium	2,002	Approve/Disapprove^{[a]}	33%	43%	24%	—N/a	–10%
19–20 June	Opinium	1,953	Approve/Disapprove^{[a]}	35%	39%	26%	—N/a	–4%
28–30 May	Opinium	1,949	Approve/Disapprove^{[a]}	39%	37%	24%	—N/a	+2%
17–20 May	Opinium	2,005	Approve/Disapprove^{[a]}	33%	41%	26%	—N/a	–8%
8–10 May	Opinium	1,948	Approve/Disapprove^{[a]}	31%	40%	29%	—N/a	–9%

=== Nicola Sturgeon ===
The following polls asked about British voters' opinions on Nicola Sturgeon, Leader of the Scottish National Party and First Minister of Scotland. Note that these polls asked the opinions of British voters as a whole, not specifically for Scottish Voters (see below).

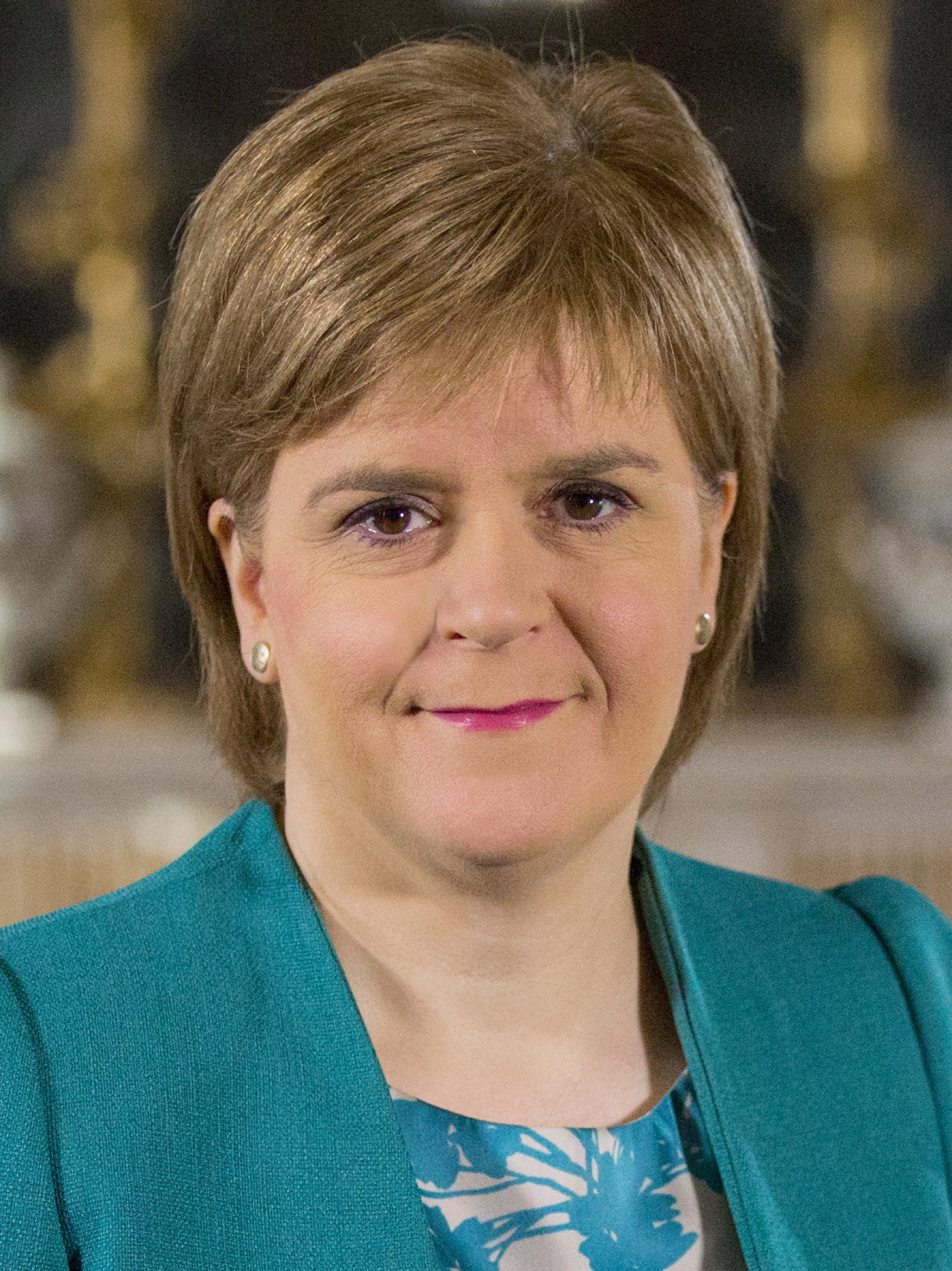
Nicola Sturgeon, First Minister of Scotland and Leader of the SNP

==== 2019 ====
Date(s) conducted	Polling organisation/client	Sample size	Question wording	Approve	Disapprove	Neither	Don't know	Net approval
13-14 Dec	YouGov	1,628	Approve/Disapprove^{[a]}	29%	54%	—N/a	17%	–25%
27–29 Nov	Opinium	2,018	Approve/Disapprove^{[a]}	24%	40%	—N/a	36%	–16%
27-28 Nov	Panelbase	2,010	Approve/Disapprove^{[a]}	24%	40%	25%	11%	–16%
13-14 Nov	Panelbase	1,021	Approve/Disapprove^{[a]}	24%	41%	24%	11%	–17%
11-12 Nov	YouGov	1,619	Approve/Disapprove^{[a]}	25%	57%	—N/a	18%	–32%
6–8 Nov	Panelbase	1,046	Well/Badly	24%	39%	25%	12%	–15%
30 Oct–1 Nov	Opinium	2,004	Approve/Disapprove^{[a]}	23%	41%	—N/a	36%	–18%
30–31 Oct	Panelbase	1,001	Approve/Disapprove^{[a]}	24%	42%	24%	10%	–18%
23-25 Oct	Opinium	2,001	Approve/Disapprove^{[a]}	23%	42%	—N/a	35%	–19%
15-17 Oct	Opinium	2,001	Approve/Disapprove^{[a]}	24%	40%	—N/a	36%	–16%
9–11 Oct	Panelbase	2,013	Approve/Disapprove^{[a]}	26%	39%	23%	12%	–13%
3–4 Oct	Opinium	2,006	Approve/Disapprove^{[a]}	26%	35%	—N/a	39%	–9%
25-27 Sep	Opinium	2,007	Approve/Disapprove^{[a]}	25%	38%	—N/a	37%	–13%
21–23 Aug	Opinium	2,005	Approve/Disapprove^{[a]}	25%	39%	—N/a	35%	–14%
8–9 Aug	Opinium	2,001	Approve/Disapprove^{[a]}	26%	40%	—N/a	34%	–14%
24–26 Jul	Opinium	2,006	Approve/Disapprove^{[a]}	24%	38%	—N/a	38%	–14%
3–5 July	Opinium	2,002	Approve/Disapprove^{[a]}	24%	42%	34%	—N/a	–18%
19–20 June	Opinium	1,953	Approve/Disapprove^{[a]}	24%	38%	38%	—N/a	–14%
28–30 May	Opinium	1,949	Approve/Disapprove^{[a]}	26%	40%	44%	—N/a	–14%
17–20 May	Opinium	2,005	Approve/Disapprove^{[a]}	24%	41%	35%	—N/a	–17%
8–10 May	Opinium	2,004	Approve/Disapprove^{[a]}	26%	42%	32%	—N/a	–16%
9–12 Apr	Opinium	1,951	Satisfied/Dissatisfied	26%	35%	—N/a	39%	–9%
28–29 Mar	Opinium	2,008	Satisfied/Dissatisfied	24%	41%	—N/a	35%	–17%
20–22 Mar	Opinium/The Observer	2,002	Satisfied/Dissatisfied	24%	39%	—N/a	37%	–15%
12–15 Mar	Opinium	2,008	Approve/Disapprove	23%	39%	38%	—N/a	–16%
26 Feb – 1 Mar	Opinium	1,948	Approve/Disapprove	27%	39%	37%	—N/a	–12%
20–22 Feb	Opinium	2,008	Approve/Disapprove	23%	40%	37%	—N/a	–17%
30 Jan – 1 Feb	Opinium	2,008	Approve/Disapprove	22%	39%	38%	—N/a	–17%
16–18 Jan	Opinium	2,007	Approve/Disapprove	24%	37%	39%	—N/a	–13%

==== 2018 ====
Date(s) conducted	Polling organisation/client	Sample size	Question wording	Approve	Disapprove	Neither	Don't know	Net approval
13–14 Dec	Opinium	2,016	Approve/Disapprove	24%	39%	37%	—N/a	–15%
14 Nov	Opinium	1,948	Approve/Disapprove	23%	37%	40%	—N/a	–14%
11 Oct	Opinium	2,010	Approve/Disapprove	24%	40%	36%	—N/a	–16%
3–5 Oct	Opinium	2,007	Approve/Disapprove	23%	37%	30%	—N/a	–14%
18–20 Sep	Opinium	2,003	Approve/Disapprove	23%	38%	39	—N/a	–15%
11 Sep	Opinium	2,011	Approve/Disapprove	24%	36%	40%	—N/a	–12%
13–14 Aug	Opinium	2,003	Approve/Disapprove	22%	39%	40%	—N/a	–16%
10–13 Jul	Opinium	2,005	Approve/Disapprove	24%	39%	36%	—N/a	–15%
5–7 Jun	Opinium	2,005	Approve/Disapprove	24%	38%	37%	—N/a	–14%
15–16 May	Opinium	2,009	Approve/Disapprove	24%	37%	39%	—N/a	–13%
10–12 Apr	Opinium	2,008	Approve/Disapprove	22%	42%	36%	—N/a	–20%
13–15 Mar	Opinium	2,001	Approve/Disapprove	22%	40%	38%	—N/a	–18%
6–8 Feb	Opinium	2,002	Approve/Disapprove	21%	42%	38%	—N/a	–21%
11–12 Jan	Opinium	2,008	Approve/Disapprove	21%	42%	25%	—N/a	–21%

==== 2017 ====
Date(s) conducted	Polling organisation/client	Sample size	Question wording	Approve	Disapprove	Neither	Don't know	Net approval
12–14 Dec	Opinium	2,005	Approve/Disapprove	20%	43%	37%	—N/a	–23%
14–16 Nov	Opinium	2,003	Approve/Disapprove	21%	45%	34%	—N/a	–24%
4–6 Oct	Opinium	2,009	Approve/Disapprove	20%	45%	35%	—N/a	–25%
19–22 Sep	Opinium	2,004	Approve/Disapprove	20%	45%	35%	—N/a	–25%
12–15 Sep	Opinium	2,009	Approve/Disapprove	19%	46%	35%	—N/a	–27%
15–18 Aug	Opinium	2,006	Approve/Disapprove	20%	47%	33%	—N/a	–27%
11–14 Jul	Opinium	2,013	Approve/Disapprove	18%	48%	34%	—N/a	–30%
27–29 Jun	Opinium	2,010	Approve/Disapprove	18%	48%	34%	—N/a	–30%

== Approval ratings for former party leaders ==
=== Theresa May ===
The following polls asked about voters' opinions on Theresa May, former Leader of the Conservatives and former Prime Minister of the United Kingdom.

==== 2019 ====
Date(s) conducted	Polling organisation/client	Sample size	Question wording	Approve	Disapprove	Neither	Don't know	Net approval
3–5 Jul	Opinium	2,002	Approve/Disapprove^{[a]}	22%	57%	21%	—N/a	–35%
19–20 Jun	Opinium	1,953	Approve/Disapprove^{[a]}	20%	56%	24%	—N/a	–36%
28–30 May	Opinium	1,949	Approve/Disapprove^{[a]}	18%	59%	23%	—N/a	–41%
17–20 May	Opinium	2,005	Approve/Disapprove^{[a]}	20%	62%	18%	—N/a	–42%
14–15 May	YouGov	1,765	Well/Badly	21%	70%	—N/a	9%	–49%
8–10 May	Opinium	2,004	Approve/Disapprove^{[a]}	20%	60%	21%	—N/a	–40%
9–12 Apr	Opinium	1,951	Satisfied/Dissatisfied	22%	56%	—N/a	22%	–34%
28–29 Mar	Opinium	2,008	Satisfied/Dissatisfied	24%	55%	—N/a	21%	–31%
24 Mar	YouGov	1,700	Well/Badly	26%	65%	—N/a	9%	–39%
20–22 Mar	Opinium/The Observer	2,002	Satisfied/Dissatisfied	26%	56%	—N/a	18%	–30%
15–19 Mar	Ipsos MORI	1,050	Satisfied/Dissatisfied	29%	65%	—N/a	6%	–36%
14–15 Mar	YouGov	1,756	Well/Badly	26%	66%	—N/a	8%	–40%
12–15 Mar	Opinium	2,008	Approve/Disapprove	27%	51%	22%	—N/a	–24%
26 Feb – 1 Mar	Opinium	1,948	Approve/Disapprove	30%	51%	19%	—N/a	–21%
21–23 Feb	Deltapoll	1,027	Well/Badly	35%	57%	—N/a	8%	–22%
20–22 Feb	Opinium	2,008	Approve/Disapprove	31%	49%	20%	—N/a	–18%
13–15 Feb	Opinium	2,005	Approve/Disapprove	28%	49%	23%	—N/a	–21%
8–11 Feb	Deltapoll	2,004	Well/Badly	35%	56%	—N/a	9%	–21%
4–8 Feb	BMG Research	2,005	Satisfied/Dissatisfied	32%	56%	—N/a	12%	–24%
1–5 Feb	Ipsos MORI	1,005	Satisfied/Dissatisfied	33%	58%	—N/a	9%	–25%
30 Jan – 1 Feb	Opinium	2,008	Approve/Disapprove	31%	48%	21%	—N/a	–17%
30 Jan	YouGov	TBA	Favourable/Unfavourable	TBA	TBA	—N/a	TBA	–28%
16–18 Jan	Opinium	2,007	Approve/Disapprove	29%	49%	22%	—N/a	–20%

==== 2018 ====
Date(s) conducted	Polling organisation/client	Sample size	Question wording	Approve	Disapprove	Neither	Don't know	Net approval
18–19 Dec	YouGov	1,675	Well/Badly	33%	56%	—N/a	11%	–23%
13–14 Dec	Deltapoll	2,022	Well/Badly	40%	55%	—N/a	6%	–15%
13–14 Dec	Opinium	2,016	Approve/Disapprove	30%	50%	21%	—N/a	–20%
30 Nov – 5 Dec	Ipsos MORI	1,049	Satisfied/Dissatisfied	35%	57%	—N/a	8%	–22%
14 Nov	Opinium	1,948	Approve/Disapprove	29%	49%	22%	—N/a	–20%
19–22 Oct	Ipsos MORI	1,044	Satisfied/Dissatisfied	29%	61%	—N/a	10%	–32%
11 Oct	Opinium	2,010	Approve/Disapprove	30%	47%	23%	—N/a	–17%
3–5 Oct	Opinium	2,007	Approve/Disapprove	33%	45%	22%	—N/a	–12%
30 Sep – 1 Oct	YouGov	1,607	Well/Badly	33%	56%	—N/a	11%	–23%
18–20 Sep	Opinium	2,003	Approve/Disapprove	30%	48%	22%	—N/a	–18%
11 Sep	Opinium	2,011	Approve/Disapprove	28%	48%	24%	—N/a	–20%
31 Aug – 1 Sep	Survation	1,017	Favourable/Unfavourable	32%	41%	24%	3%	–9%
14–16 Aug	Deltapoll	1,904	Well/Badly	33%	59%	—N/a	8%	–26%
14 Aug	Opinium	2,003	Approve/Disapprove	28%	49%	33%	—N/a	–21%
19–20 Jul	YouGov	1,668	Well/Badly	24%	66%	—N/a	10%	–42%
12–14 Jul	Deltapoll	1,484	Well/Badly	30%	62%	—N/a	8%	–32%
10–13 Jul	Opinium	2,005	Approve/Disapprove	26%	50%	24%	—N/a	–24%
10–11 Jul	YouGov	1,732	Favourable/Unfavourable	25%	62%	—N/a	13%	–37%
22–27 Jun	Ipsos Mori	1,026	Satisfied/Dissatisfied	35%	58%	—N/a	7%	–23%
5–7 Jun	Opinium	2,005	Approve/Disapprove	34%	42%	24%	—N/a	–8%
18–22 May	Ipsos MORI	1,015	Satisfied/Dissatisfied	37%	56%	—N/a	7%	–19%
15–16 May	Opinium	2,009	Approve/Disapprove	35%	43%	22%	—N/a	–8%
1–2 May	YouGov	1,675	Favourable/Unfavourable	34%	55%	—N/a	11%	–21%
20–24 Apr	Ipsos MORI	1,004	Satisfied/Dissatisfied	38%	55%	—N/a	7%	–17%
16–17 Apr	YouGov	1,631	Favourable/Unfavourable	38%	52%	—N/a	11%	–14%
10–12 Apr	Opinium	2,008	Approve/Disapprove	35%	43%	22%	—N/a	–8%
4–6 Apr	YouGov	3,298	Favourable/Unfavourable	37%	50%	—N/a	13%	–13%
4–5 Apr	YouGov	1,662	Well/Badly	41%	47%	—N/a	12%	–6%
18–19 Mar	YouGov	1,845	Favourable/Unfavourable	36%	51%	—N/a	12%	–15%
13–15 Mar	Opinium	2,001	Approve/Disapprove	34%	43%	23%	—N/a	–9%
2–7 Mar	Ipsos MORI	1,012	Satisfied/Dissatisfied	41%	52%	—N/a	7%	–11%
6–9 Feb	BMG Research	1,507	Satisfied/Dissatisfied	33%	51%	—N/a	15%	–18%
6–8 Feb	Opinium	2,002	Approve/Disapprove	34%	45%	21%	—N/a	–11%
19–23 Jan	Ipsos MORI	1,031	Satisfied/Dissatisfied	38%	55%	—N/a	8%	–17%
11–12 Jan	Opinium	2,008	Approve/Disapprove	29%	46%	25%	—N/a	–17%
9–12 Jan	BMG Research	1,513	Satisfied/Dissatisfied	32%	53%	—N/a	15%	–21%

==== 2017 ====
Date(s) conducted	Polling organisation/client	Sample size	Question wording	Approve	Disapprove	Neither	Don't know	Net approval
19–20 Dec	YouGov	1,610	Well/Badly	37%	51%	—N/a	11%	–14%
12–14 Dec	ICM Research	2,004	Good job/Bad job	35%	50%	—N/a	16%	–15%
12–14 Dec	Opinium	2,005	Approve/Disapprove	33%	45%	22%	—N/a	–12%
5–8 Dec	BMG Research	1,509	Satisfied/Dissatisfied	30%	56%	—N/a	14%	–26%
29 Nov – 1 Dec	ICM Research	2,050	Good job/Bad job	32%	50%	—N/a	18%	–18%
24–28 Nov	Ipsos MORI	1,003	Satisfied/Dissatisfied	32%	59%	—N/a	9%	–27%
14–17 Nov	BMG Research	1,507	Satisfied/Dissatisfied	35%	52%	—N/a	13%	–17%
14–16 Nov	Opinium	2,003	Approve/Disapprove	33%	46%	21%	—N/a	–13%
9–10 Nov	YouGov	1,644	Favourable/Unfavourable	32%	55%	—N/a	—N/a	–23%
7–8 Nov	YouGov / The Times	2,012	Well/Badly	31%	55%	—N/a	14%	–24%
27 Oct – 1 Nov	Ipsos MORI	1,052	Satisfied/Dissatisfied	37%	53%	—N/a	11%	–16%
20–23 Oct	ICM/The Guardian	2,022	Good job/Bad job	34%	50%	—N/a	16%	–16%
17–20 Oct	BMG Research	1,506	Satisfied/Dissatisfied	32%	54%	—N/a	14%	–22%
4–6 Oct	Opinium/Observer	2,009	Approve/Disapprove	30%	47%	23%	—N/a	–17%
4–5 Oct	YouGov / The Times	1,615	Well/Badly	31%	59%	—N/a	10%	–28%
26–29 Sep	BMG/The Independent	1,910	Satisfied/Dissatisfied	33%	52%	—N/a	15%	–19%
19–22 Sep	Opinium/Observer	2,004	Approve/Disapprove	33%	44%	24%	—N/a	–11%
15–18 Sep	Ipsos MORI	1,023	Satisfied/Dissatisfied	37%	54%	—N/a	10%	–17%
12–15 Sep	BMG Research	1,447	Satisfied/Dissatisfied	34%	50%	—N/a	15%	–16%
12–15 Sep	Opinium/Observer	2,009	Approve/Disapprove	33%	44%	23%	—N/a	–11%
4–5 Sep	YouGov	1,644	Favourable/Unfavourable	34%	54%	—N/a	12%	–20%
15–18 Aug	Opinium/Observer	2,006	Approve/Disapprove	31%	48%	21%	—N/a	–17%
15–16 Aug	YouGov	1,697	Favourable/Unfavourable	31%	58%	—N/a	11%	–27%
8–11 Aug	BMG/The Independent	1,512	Satisfied/Dissatisfied	36%	50%	—N/a	14%	–14%
14–18 Jul	Ipsos MORI	1,071	Satisfied/Dissatisfied	34%	59%	—N/a	7%	–25%
11–14 Jul	BMG/The Independent	1,518	Satisfied/Dissatisfied	32%	55%	—N/a	14%	–23%
11–14 Jul	Opinium/Observer	2,013	Approve/Disapprove	30%	51%	19%	—N/a	–21%
30 Jun – 3 Jul	ICM/The Guardian	2,044	Good job/Bad job	28%	54%	—N/a	18%	–26%
27–29 Jun	Opinium/Observer	2,010	Approve/Disapprove	31%	51%	18%	—N/a	–20%
16–21 Jun	Panelbase/Sunday Times	5,481	Good job/Bad job	28%	45%	27%	—N/a	–17%
11–12 Jun	YouGov	1,729	Favourable/Unfavourable	29%	63%	—N/a	8%	–34%

=== Vince Cable ===
The following polls asked about voters' opinions on Sir Vince Cable, former Leader of the Liberal Democrats from 20 July 2017 to 22 July 2019.

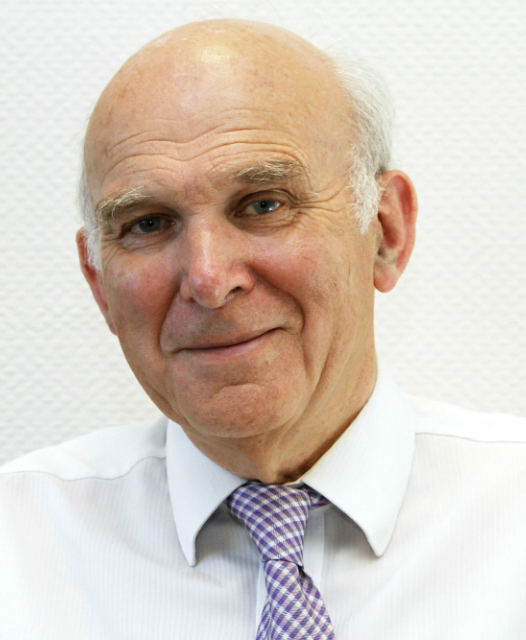
Sir Vince Cable, Former Leader of the Liberal Democrats

==== 2019 ====
Date(s) conducted	Polling organisation/client	Sample size	Question wording	Approve	Disapprove	Neither	Don't know	Net approval
3–5 July	Opinium	2,002	Approve/Disapprove^{[a]}	22%	34%	44%	—N/a	–12%
19–20 June	Opinium	1,953	Approve/Disapprove^{[a]}	24%	31%	45%	—N/a	–7%
28–30 May	Opinium	1,949	Approve/Disapprove^{[a]}	30%	30%	40%	—N/a	Tie
17–20 May	Opinium	2,005	Approve/Disapprove^{[a]}	25%	32%	43%	—N/a	–7%
8–10 May	Opinium	2,004	Approve/Disapprove^{[a]}	22%	31%	47%	—N/a	–9%
9–12 Apr	Opinium	1,951	Satisfied/Dissatisfied	19%	31%	—N/a	50%	–12%
28–29 Mar	Opinium	2,008	Satisfied/Dissatisfied	18%	33%	—N/a	49%	–15%
20–22 Mar	Opinium/The Observer	2,002	Satisfied/Dissatisfied	18%	32%	—N/a	50%	–14%
1–5 Feb	Ipsos MORI	1,005	Satisfied/Dissatisfied	24%	42%	—N/a	34%	–18%
12–15 Mar	Opinium	2,008	Approve/Disapprove	19%	33%	48%	—N/a	–14%
26 Feb – 1 Mar	Opinium	1,948	Approve/Disapprove	20%	30%	50%	—N/a	–10%
21–23 Feb	Deltapoll	1,027	Well/Badly	24%	42%	—N/a	34%	–18%
20–22 Feb	Opinium	2,008	Approve/Disapprove	18%	34%	48%	—N/a	–16%
8 Feb	Ipsos MORI	TBA	Satisfied/Dissatisfied	24%	41%	35%	—N/a	–17%
30 Jan – 1 Feb	Opinium	2,008	Approve/Disapprove	17%	31%	52%	—N/a	–14%
16–18 Jan	Opinium	2,007	Approve/Disapprove	18%	30%	52%	—N/a	–12%

==== 2018 ====
Date(s) conducted	Polling organisation/client	Sample size	Question wording	Approve	Disapprove	Neither	Don't know	Net approval
13–14 Dec	Deltapoll	2,022	Well/Badly	29%	48%	—N/a	24%	–19%
13–14 Dec	Opinium	2,016	Approve/Disapprove	24%	39%	37%	—N/a	–15%
30 Nov – 5 Dec	Ipsos MORI	1,049	Satisfied/Dissatisfied	24%	38%	—N/a	38%	–14%
14 Nov	Opinium	1,948	Approve/Disapprove	19%	30%	51%	—N/a	–11%
19–22 Oct	Ipsos MORI	1,044	Satisfied/Dissatisfied	19%	38%	—N/a	42%	–19%
11 Oct	Opinium	2,010	Approve/Disapprove	17%	32%	49%	—N/a	–15%
3–5 Oct	Opinium	2,007	Approve/Disapprove	18%	31%	49%	—N/a	–13%
30 Sep – 1 Oct	YouGov	1,607	Well/Badly	20%	47%	—N/a	33%	–27%
18–20 Sep	Opinium	2,003	Approve/Disapprove	18%	34%	48%	—N/a	–16%
11 Sep	Opinium	2,011	Approve/Disapprove	17%	28%	55%	—N/a	–11%
31 Aug – 1 Sep	Survation	1,017	Favourable/Unfavourable	18%	32%	37%	13%	–14%
14 Aug	Opinium	2,003	Approve/Disapprove	16%	31%	53%	—N/a	–15%
14–16 Jul	Deltapoll	1,904	Well/Badly	19%	47%	—N/a	34%	–28%
19–20 Jul	YouGov	1,668	Well/Badly	15%	38%	—N/a	47%	–23%
12–14 Jul	Deltapoll	1,484	Well/Badly	21%	47%	—N/a	32%	–26%
10–13 Jul	Opinium	2,005	Approve/Disapprove	18%	30%	52%	—N/a	–12%
10–11 Jul	YouGov	1,732	Favourable/Unfavourable	23%	43%	—N/a	34%	–20%
22–27 Jun	Ipsos Mori	1,026	Satisfied/Dissatisfied	27%	34%	—N/a	38%	–7%
5–7 Jun	Opinium	2,005	Approve/Disapprove	18%	29%	53%	—N/a	–11%
18–22 May	Ipsos MORI	1,015	Satisfied/Dissatisfied	28%	33%	—N/a	39%	–5%
15–16 May	Opinium	2,009	Approve/Disapprove	19%	27%	54%	—N/a	–8%
20–24 Apr	Ipsos MORI	1,004	Satisfied/Dissatisfied	28%	35%	—N/a	37%	–7%
10–12 Apr	Opinium	2,008	Approve/Disapprove	16%	34%	50%	—N/a	–18%
4–6 Apr	YouGov	3,298	Favourable/Unfavourable	20%	43%	—N/a	37%	–23%
18–19 Mar	YouGov	1,845	Favourable/Unfavourable	19%	42%	—N/a	38%	–23%
13–15 Mar	Opinium	2,001	Approve/Disapprove	16%	35%	48%	—N/a	–19%
2–7 Mar	Ipsos MORI	1,012	Satisfied/Dissatisfied	25%	37%	—N/a	38%	–12%
6–8 Feb	Opinium	2,002	Approve/Disapprove	15%	33%	51%	—N/a	–18%
19–23 Jan	Ipsos MORI	1,031	Satisfied/Dissatisfied	25%	37%	—N/a	39%	–12%
11–12 Jan	Opinium	2,008	Approve/Disapprove	14%	33%	53%	—N/a	–19%

==== 2017 ====
Date(s) conducted	Polling organisation/client	Sample size	Question wording	Approve	Disapprove	Neither	Don't know	Net approval
19–20 Dec	YouGov	1,610	Well/Badly	19%	29%	—N/a	53%	–10%
12–14 Dec	ICM Research	2,004	Good job/Bad job	16%	34%	—N/a	49%	–18%
12–14 Dec	Opinium	2,005	Approve/Disapprove	15%	32%	53%	—N/a	–17%
29 Nov – 1 Dec	ICM Research	2,050	Good job/Bad job	19%	31%	—N/a	50%	–12%
24–28 Nov	Ipsos MORI	1,003	Approve/Disapprove	27%	39%	—N/a	35%	–12%
14–16 Nov	Opinium	2,003	Approve/Disapprove	15%	33%	52%	—N/a	–18%
27 Oct – 1 Nov	Ipsos MORI	1,052	Satisfied/Dissatisfied	26%	33%	—N/a	42%	–7%
4–6 Oct	Opinium/Observer	2,009	Approve/Disapprove	14%	33%	52%	—N/a	–19%
19–22 Sep	Opinium/Observer	2,004	Approve/Disapprove	18%	34%	48%	—N/a	–17%
15–18 Sep	Ipsos MORI	1,023	Satisfied/Dissatisfied	30%	31%	—N/a	39%	–1%
12–15 Sep	Opinium/Observer	2,009	Approve/Disapprove	13%	35%	52%	—N/a	–22%
4–5 Sep	YouGov	1,644	Favourable/Unfavourable	23%	38%	—N/a	39%	–15%
15–18 Aug	Opinium/Observer	2,006	Approve/Disapprove	14%	35%	51%	—N/a	–21%
15–16 Aug	YouGov	1,697	Favourable/Unfavourable	18%	45%	—N/a	36%	–27%

=== Heidi Allen ===
The following polls asked about voters' opinions on Heidi Allen, Acting Leader of Change UK from 29 March 2019 to 4 June 2019.

==== 2019 ====
Date(s) conducted	Polling organisation/client	Sample size	Question wording	Approve	Disapprove	Neither	Don't know	Net approval
28–30 May	Opinium	1,949	Approve/Disapprove^{[a]}	11%	34%	55%	—N/a	–23%
17–20 May	Opinium	2,005	Approve/Disapprove^{[a]}	11%	30%	59%	—N/a	–19%
8–10 May	Opinium	1,948	Approve/Disapprove^{[a]}	14%	24%	62%	—N/a	–10%

=== Gerard Batten ===
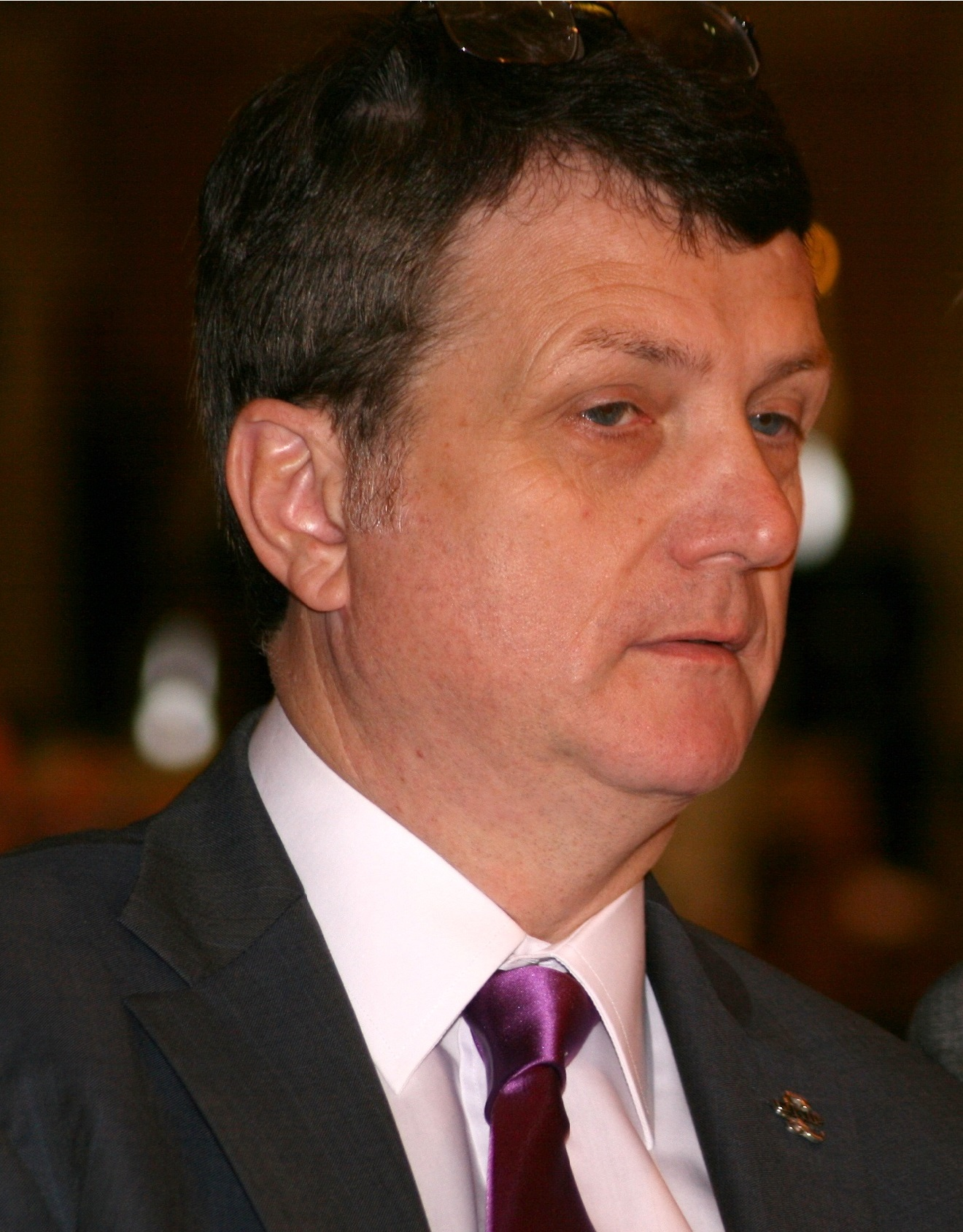
Gerard Batten, former leader of UKIP

The following polls asked about voters' opinions on Gerard Batten, who served as Leader of the UK Independence Party from 14 April 2018 to 2 June 2019, and Acting Leader between 17 February 2018 and 14 April 2018.

==== 2019 ====
Date(s) conducted	Polling organisation/client	Sample size	Question wording	Approve	Disapprove	Neither	Don't know	Net approval
19–20 June	Opinium	1,953	Approve/Disapprove^{[a]}	7%	46%	47%	—N/a	–39%
28–30 May	Opinium	1,949	Approve/Disapprove^{[a]}	11%	45%	44%	—N/a	–34%
17–20 May	Opinium	2,005	Approve/Disapprove^{[a]}	9%	46%	45%	—N/a	–37%
8–10 May	Opinium	2,004	Approve/Disapprove^{[a]}	11%	43%	46%	—N/a	–32%
9–12 Apr	Opinium	1,951	Satisfied/Dissatisfied	12%	37%	—N/a	51%	–25%
28–29 Mar	Opinium	2,008	Satisfied/Dissatisfied	10%	41%	—N/a	49%	–31%
20–22 Mar	Opinium/The Observer	2,002	Satisfied/Dissatisfied	11%	41%	—N/a	48%	–30%
12–15 Mar	Opinium	2,008	Approve/Disapprove	9%	40%	51%	—N/a	–31%
26 Feb – 1 Mar	Opinium	1,948	Approve/Disapprove	11%	40%	49%	—N/a	–29%
20–22 Feb	Opinium	2,008	Approve/Disapprove	9%	38%	53%	—N/a	–29%
30 Jan – 1 Feb	Opinium	2,008	Approve/Disapprove	9%	39%	52%	—N/a	–30%
16–18 Jan	Opinium	2,007	Approve/Disapprove	10%	38%	52%	—N/a	–28%

==== 2018 ====
Date(s) conducted	Polling organisation/client	Sample size	Question wording	Approve	Disapprove	Neither	Don't know	Net approval
13–14 Dec	Opinium	2,016	Approve/Disapprove	10%	42%	48%	—N/a	–32%
14 Nov	Opinium	1,948	Approve/Disapprove	9%	35%	66%	—N/a	–26%
11 Oct	Opinium	2,010	Approve/Disapprove	8%	37%	55%	—N/a	–29%
3–5 Oct	Opinium	2,007	Approve/Disapprove	11%	34%	55%	—N/a	–23%
18–20 Sep	Opinium	2,003	Approve/Disapprove	10%	35%	55%	—N/a	–25%
11 Sep	Opinium	2,011	Approve/Disapprove	9%	33%	60%	—N/a	–24%
31 Aug – 1 Sep	Survation	1,017	Favourable/Unfavourable	10%	18%	32%	41%	–8%
13–14 Aug	Opinium	2,003	Approve/Disapprove	8%	36%	56%	—N/a	–28%
10–13 Jul	Opinium	2,005	Approve/Disapprove	11%	34%	55%	—N/a	–23%
5–7 Jun	Opinium	2,005	Approve/Disapprove	9%	35%	56%	—N/a	–26%
15–16 May	Opinium	2,009	Approve/Disapprove	8%	35%	57%	—N/a	–27%
10–12 Apr	Opinium	2,008	Approve/Disapprove	8%	39%	53%	—N/a	–31%
13–15 Mar	Opinium	2,001	Approve/Disapprove	7%	41%	52%	—N/a	–34%

=== Anna Soubry ===
The following polls asked about voters' opinions on Anna Soubry, Leader of Change UK since 4 June 2019.

==== 2019 ====
Date(s) conducted	Polling organisation/client	Sample size	Question wording	Approve	Disapprove	Neither	Don't know	Net approval
19–20 June	Opinium	1,953	Approve/Disapprove^{[a]}	10%	35%	55%	—N/a	–25%

=== Henry Bolton ===
The following polls asked about voters' opinions on Henry Bolton, who served as Leader of the UK Independence Party from 29 September 2017 until 17 February 2018.

==== 2018 ====
Date(s) conducted	Polling organisation/client	Sample size	Question wording	Approve	Disapprove	Neither	Don't know	Net approval
6–8 Feb	Opinium	2,002	Approve/Disapprove	8%	50%	42%	—N/a	–42%
11–12 Jan	Opinium	2,008	Approve/Disapprove	5%	40%	55%	—N/a	–35%

==== 2017 ====
Date(s) conducted	Polling organisation/client	Sample size	Question wording	Approve	Disapprove	Neither	Don't know	Net approval
12–14 Dec	Opinium	2,005	Approve/Disapprove	7%	39%	54%	—N/a	–32%
14–16 Nov	Opinium	2,003	Approve/Disapprove	8%	38%	54%	—N/a	–30%
4–6 Oct	Opinium	2,009	Approve/Disapprove	8%	34%	58%	—N/a	–26%

=== Tim Farron ===
The following polls asked about voters' opinions on Tim Farron, who was Leader of the Liberal Democrats from 16 July 2015 until 20 July 2017.

Date(s) conducted	Polling organisation/client	Sample size	Question wording	Approve	Disapprove	Neither	Don't know	Net approval
11–14 Jul 2017	Opinium/Observer	2,013	Approve/Disapprove (Note: Question asked in polls: "To what extent do you approve or disapprove of the way Tim Farron is handling his job as Leader of the Liberal Democrats?")	12%	45%	43%	—N/a	–33%
27–29 Jun 2017	Opinium/Observer	2,010	Approve/Disapprove	12%	44%	44%	—N/a	–32%

=== Paul Nuttall ===
The following polls asked about voters' opinions on Paul Nuttall, who was Leader of the UK Independence Party from 28 November 2016 until 9 June 2017. These polls were conducted after his resignation and asked how voters how they felt he had handled his job.

Date(s) conducted	Polling organisation/client	Sample size	Question wording	Approve	Disapprove	Neither	Don't know	Net approval
11–14 Jul 2017	Opinium/Observer	2,013	Approve/Disapprove (Note: Question asked in polls: "To what extent do you approve or disapprove of the way Paul Nuttall handled his job as Leader of the UK Independence Party?")	7%	54%	39%	—N/a	–47%
27–29 Jun 2017	Opinium/Observer	2,010	Approve/Disapprove	7%	54%	39%	—N/a	–47%

== Approval polling in Scotland ==
The polls below were conducted amongst voters in Scotland only, and asked about their opinions on both Scottish and UK-wide political leaders.

=== Boris Johnson ===
The following polls asked about Scottish voters' opinions on Boris Johnson, Prime Minister of the United Kingdom and Leader of the Conservative Party.

Date(s) conducted	Polling organisation/ client	Sample size	Question wording	Approve	Disapprove	Don't know	Net approval
30 Aug– Sep 2019	YouGov/The Times	1,059	Well/Badly	24%	58%	17%	–34%

=== Jeremy Corbyn ===
The following polls asked about Scottish voters' opinions on Jeremy Corbyn, Leader of the Labour Party and Leader of the Opposition.

Date(s) conducted	Polling organisation/ client	Sample size	Question wording	Approve	Disapprove	Don't know	Net approval
30 Aug– Sep 2019	YouGov/The Times	1,059	Well/Badly	13%	71%	16%	–58%
18–20 Jun 2019	Panelbase/The Sunday Times	1,024	Well/Badly	16%	60%	24%	–44%
1–5 Jun 2018	YouGov/The Times	1,075	Well/Badly	28%	58%	14%	–30%
24–26 Apr 2019	YouGov/The Times	1,029	Well/Badly	12%	77%	12%	–65%
12–16 Jan 2018	YouGov/The Times	1,002	Well/Badly	40%	43%	17%	–3%
2–5 Oct 2017	YouGov/The Times	1,135	Well/Badly	53%	33%	14%	+20%

=== Nicola Sturgeon ===
The following polls asked about Scottish voters' opinions on Nicola Sturgeon, Leader of the Scottish National Party and First Minister of Scotland.

Date(s) conducted	Polling organisation/ client	Sample size	Question wording	Approve	Disapprove	Don't know	Net approval
30 Aug– Sep 2019	YouGov/The Times	1,059	Well/Badly	47%	42%	11%	+5%
18–20 Jun 2019	Panelbase/The Sunday Times	1,024	Well/Badly	39%	39%	22%	0%
24–26 Apr 2019	YouGov/The Times	1,029	Well/Badly	47%	46%	8%	+1%
1–4 Mar 2019	Survation/Scottish Daily Mail	1,011	Well/Badly	40%	38%	23%	+2%
1–5 Jun 2018	YouGov/The Times	1,075	Well/Badly	45%	47%	8%	–2%
12–16 Jan 2018	YouGov/The Times	1,002	Well/Badly	43%	43%	13%	0%
2–5 Oct 2017	YouGov/The Times	1,135	Well/Badly	46%	46%	9%	0%

=== Nigel Farage ===
The following polls asked about Scottish voters' opinions on Nigel Farage, Leader of the Brexit Party.

Date(s) conducted	Polling organisation/ client	Sample size	Question wording	Approve	Disapprove	Don't know	Net approval
18–20 Jun 2019	Panelbase/The Sunday Times	1,024	Well/Badly	24%	48%	28%	–24%

=== Richard Leonard ===
The following polls asked about Scottish voters' opinions on Richard Leonard, Leader of the Scottish Labour Party.

Date(s) conducted	Polling organisation/ client	Sample size	Question wording	Approve	Disapprove	Don't know	Net approval
30 Aug– Sep 2019	YouGov/The Times	1,059	Well/Badly	7%	40%	53%	–33%
18–20 Jun 2019	Panelbase/The Sunday Times	1,024	Well/Badly	10%	41%	49%	–31%
24–26 Apr 2019	YouGov/The Times	1,029	Well/Badly	10%	39%	51%	–29%
1–5 Jun 2018	YouGov/The Times	1,075	Well/Badly	13%	33%	54%	–20%
12–16 Jan 2018	YouGov/The Times	1,002	Well/Badly	12%	27%	60%	–15%

=== Patrick Harvie ===
The following polls asked about Scottish voters' opinions on Patrick Harvie, Co-Convenor of the Scottish Green Party.

Date(s) conducted	Polling organisation/ client	Sample size	Question wording	Approve	Disapprove	Don't know	Net approval
21 Oct 2018	[Survation]	1,017	Well/Badly	13%	26%	62%	–13%
1–5 Jun 2018	YouGov/The Times	1,075	Well/Badly	15%	26%	59%	–9%
19 Sep 2016	[Survation]	1,073	Well/Badly	17%	19%	63%	–2%

=== Former Party Leaders ===
==== Theresa May ====
The following polls asked about Scottish voters' opinions on Theresa May, former Leader of the Conservatives and Prime Minister of the United Kingdom.

Date(s) conducted	Polling organisation/ client	Sample size	Question wording	Approve	Disapprove	Don't know	Net approval
18–20 Jun 2019	Panelbase/The Sunday Times	1,024	Well/Badly	15%	61%	24%	–46%
24–26 Apr 2019	YouGov/The Times	1,029	Well/Badly	18%	76%	6%	–58%
1–5 Jun 2018	YouGov/The Times	1,075	Well/Badly	24%	68%	8%	–44%
12–16 Jan 2018	YouGov/The Times	1,002	Well/Badly	21%	68%	10%	–47%
2–5 Oct 2017	YouGov/The Times	1,135	Well/Badly	21%	70%	10%	–49%

==== Vince Cable ====
The following polls asked about Scottish voters' opinions on Vince Cable, former Leader of the Liberal Democrats.

Date(s) conducted	Polling organisation/ client	Sample size	Question wording	Approve	Disapprove	Don't know	Net approval
18–20 Jun 2019	Panelbase/The Sunday Times	1,024	Well/Badly	22%	28%	50%	–6%

==== Ruth Davidson ====
The following polls asked about Scottish voters' opinions on Ruth Davidson, former Leader of the Scottish Conservative Party.

Date(s) conducted	Polling organisation/ client	Sample size	Question wording	Approve	Disapprove	Don't know	Net approval
18–20 Jun 2019	Panelbase/The Sunday Times	1,024	Well/Badly	33%	34%	33%	–1%
24–26 Apr 2019	YouGov/The Times	1,029	Well/Badly	42%	32%	26%	+10%
1–5 Jun 2018	YouGov/The Times	1,075	Well/Badly	45%	34%	21%	+11%
12–16 Jan 2018	YouGov/The Times	1,002	Well/Badly	45%	30%	26%	+15%
2–5 Oct 2017	YouGov/The Times	1,135	Well/Badly	47%	30%	23%	+17%

== Preferred prime minister polling ==
Some opinion pollsters ask voters which party leader they would prefer as prime minister — Boris Johnson (Conservative Party) or Jeremy Corbyn (Labour Party). The questions differ slightly from pollster to pollster:

- Opinium: "Which, if any, of the following people do you think would be the best prime minister?"
- BMG Research: "If you had to choose between the two, who would you prefer to see as the next Prime Minister?"
- YouGov / Survation: "Which of the following do you think would make the best Prime Minister?"
- Ipsos MORI: "Who do you think would make the most capable Prime Minister, the Conservatives’ Boris Johnson, or Labour’s Jeremy Corbyn?"
- ICM: "Putting aside which party you support, and only thinking about your impressions of them as leaders, which one of the following do you think would make the best Prime Minister for Britain?"

=== Johnson vs Corbyn ===
==== 2019 ====
Date(s) conducted	Polling organisation/client	Area	Sample size	Boris Johnson	Jeremy Corbyn	None of these	Unsure	Refused	Lead
27–29 Nov	Opinium	GB	2,018	36%	19%	31%	14%	—N/a	17%
11-12 Nov	YouGov	GB	1,619	44%	22%	34%	—N/a	—N/a	22%
7-11 Nov	Kantar	GB	1,165	33%	19%	37%	11%	—N/a	14%
31 Oct–4 Nov	YouGov	Wales	1,136	41%	26%	32%			15%
30 Oct–1 Nov	Opinium	GB	2,004	37%	18%	35%	10%	—N/a	19%
23-25 Oct	Opinium	GB	2,001	39%	16%	35%	10%	—N/a	23%
19–21 Oct	YouGov	GB	1,689	43%	20%	34%	—N/a	3%	23%
15-17 Oct	Opinium	GB	2,001	36%	15%	37%	11%	—N/a	21%
14–15 Oct	YouGov	GB	1,625	43%	21%	32%	—N/a	4%	22%
8–9 Oct	YouGov	GB	1,616	41%	21%	34%	—N/a	4%	20%
3–4 Oct	Opinium	GB	2,006	36%	16%	36%	12%	—N/a	20%
30 Sep–1 Oct	YouGov	GB	1,623	40%	22%	35%	—N/a	3%	18%
25–27 Sep	Opinium	GB	2,007	37%	16%	40%	7%	—N/a	21%
19–20 Sep	Opinium	GB	—	36%	15%	—	—	—N/a	21%
17–18 Sep	YouGov	GB	1,608	38%	22%	36%	—N/a	3%	16%
11–13 Sep	Opinium	GB	2,002	35%	16%	37%	12%	—N/a	19%
3–4 Sep	Hanbury Strategy	GB	995	45%	26%	29%	—N/a	—N/a	19%
27–28 Aug	YouGov	GB	2,006	40%	20%	36%	—N/a	4%	20%
21–23 Aug	Opinium	GB	2,005	41%	17%	34%	8%	—N/a	24%
8–9 Aug	Opinium	GB	2,001	38%	19%	34%	9%	—N/a	19%
5–6 Aug	YouGov	GB	1,628	39%	19%	37%	—N/a	4%	20%
26–30 July	Ipsos MORI	GB	1,007	52%	27%	15%	6%	—N/a	25%
29–30 July	YouGov	GB	2,066	42%	21%	34%	—N/a	3%	21%
25–27 July	Deltapoll	GB	2,001	48%	25%	28%	—N/a	—N/a	23%
24–25 July	ComRes	GB	2,029	49%	28%	24%	—N/a	—N/a	21%
23–24 July	YouGov	GB	1,715	38%	20%	38%	3%	—N/a	18%
21–22 July	YouGov	GB	1,655	34%	20%	42%	4%	—N/a	14%

=== 4-way polling ===
==== 2019 ====
Date(s) conducted	Polling organisation/client	Sample size	Boris Johnson	Jeremy Corbyn	Jo Swinson	Nigel Farage	None of these	Unsure	Refused	Lead
27-29 Nov	Opinium	2,018	32%	17%	10%	6%	20%	15%	—N/a	15%
14-16 Nov	Survation	1,010	47%	16%	15%	—N/a	—N/a	22%	—N/a	31%
30 Oct-1 Nov	Opinium	2,004	29%	16%	12%	9%	21%	13%	—N/a	13%
30-31 Oct	ComRes	2,032	32%	18%	11%	7%	33%	—N/a	—N/a	14%
23-25 Oct	Opinium	2,001	32%	13%	11%	9%	23%	12%	—N/a	19%
15-17 Oct	Opinium	2,001	30%	13%	13%	8%	24%	13%	—N/a	17%
3–4 Oct	Opinium	2,006	29%	14%	12%	7%	23%	16%	—N/a	15%
25-27 Sep	Opinium	2,007	27%	16%	14%	8%	25%	11%	—N/a	11%
25 Sep	Survation	1,011	41%	18%	21%	—N/a	—N/a	20%	—N/a	20%
19–20 Sep	Opinium	TBA	29%	13%	14%	9%	TBA	TBA	—N/a	15%
11–13 Sep	Opinium	2,002	27%	14%	12%	10%	24%	13%	—N/a	13%
3–4 Sep	Hanbury Strategy	995	40%	18%	12%	—N/a	29%	—N/a	—N/a	22%
29–30 Aug	Survation	1,020	45%	17%	19%	—N/a	19%	—N/a	—N/a	26%
21–23 Aug	Opinium	2,005	31%	15%	12%	11%	21%	10%	—N/a	16%
8–9 Aug	Opinium	2,003	30%	16%	11%	10%	22%	12%	—N/a	14%

=== May vs Corbyn ===
==== 2019 ====
Date(s) conducted	Polling organisation/client	Sample size	Theresa May	Jeremy Corbyn	None of these	Unsure	Refused	Lead
3–5 July	Opinium	2,002	19%	16%	58%	7%	—N/a	3%
18–20 June	Opinium	2,009	17%	18%	57%	8%	—N/a	1%
28–30 May	Opinium	2,005	15%	15%	60%	10%	—N/a	Tie
8–10 May	Opinium	2,004	19%	18%	55%	9%	—N/a	1%
9–12 Apr	Opinium/The Observer	2,007	24%	19%	49%	8%	—N/a	5%
2–3 Apr	YouGov	1,771	29%	20%	47%	—N/a	4%	9%
28–29 Mar	Opinium/The Observer	2,008	25%	18%	47%	10%	—N/a	7%
24–25 Mar	YouGov/The Times	2,110	31%	19%	—N/a	46%	3%	12%
20–22 Mar	Opinium/The Observer	2,002	27%	18%	44%	11%	—N/a	9%
12–15 Mar	Opinium/The Observer	2,008	29%	18%	45%	8%	—N/a	11%
26 Feb – 1 Mar	Opinium/The Observer	2,003	33%	18%	42%	7%	—N/a	15%
22–23 Feb	YouGov/The Times	1,672	39%	16%	—N/a	42%	3%	23%
20–22 Feb	Opinium	2,008	34%	20%	38%	8%	—N/a	14%
18 Feb	Survation/Daily Mail	1,021	48%	29%	—N/a	22%	—N/a	19%
13–15 Feb	Opinium	2,005	30%	22%	39%	9%	—N/a	8%
4–8 Feb	BMG	1,503	29%	22%	40%	9%	—N/a	7%
3–4 Feb	YouGov/The Times	1,851	40%	19%	—N/a	39%	2%	21%
30 Jan – 1 Feb	Opinium	2,008	32%	20%	39%	9%	—N/a	12%
16–18 Jan	Opinium	2,006	29%	22%	40%	9%	—N/a	7%
13–14 Jan	YouGov/The Times	1,701	36%	20%	—N/a	41%	3%	16%
6–7 Jan	YouGov/The Times	1,656	38%	20%	—N/a	38%	4%	18%

==== 2018 ====
Date(s) conducted	Polling organisation/client	Sample size	Theresa May	Jeremy Corbyn	None of these	Don't know	Lead
13–14 Dec	Opinium	2,016	30%	22%	39%	8%	8%
3–4 Dec	YouGov/The Times	1,624	35%	24%	4%	37%	11%
26–27 Nov	YouGov/The Times	1,737	36%	23%	3%	38%	13%
18–19 Nov	YouGov/The Times	1,671	35%	22%	4%	38%	13%
14–15 Nov	Opinium	2,003	30%	23%	38%	9%	7%
4–5 Nov	YouGov/The Times	1,637	36%	22%	3%	38%	14%
22–23 Oct	YouGov/The Times	1,802	35%	24%	3%	38%	11%
14–15 Oct	YouGov/The Times	1,649	38%	24%	—N/a	38%	14%
11–12 Oct	Opinium	2,010	33%	24%	35%	9%	9%
8–9 Oct	YouGov/The Times	1,647	36%	25%	—N/a	40%	11%
3–5 Oct	BMG Research	1,503	34%	28%	—N/a	38%	6%
30 Sep – 1 Oct	YouGov/The Times	1,607	34%	23%	—N/a	43%	11%
26–28 Sep	Opinium	2,008	33%	23%	34%	10%	10%
18–20 Sep	Opinium	2,003	33%	23%	36%	9%	10%
18–19 Sep	YouGov/The Times	2,509	36%	23%	—N/a	41%	13%
12–13 Sep	YouGov/The Times	1,620	36%	23%	—N/a	41%	13%
11–13 Sep	Opinium	2,011	32%	23%	35%	10%	9%
4–7 Sep	BMG Research	1,533	26%	25%	—N/a	49%	1%
3–4 Sep	YouGov/The Times	1,883	34%	25%	—N/a	41%	9%
28–29 Aug	YouGov/The Times	1,664	35%	23%	—N/a	42%	12%
20–21 Aug	YouGov/The Times	1,697	36%	23%	—N/a	42%	13%
14 Aug	Opinium	2,003	30%	24%	—N/a	46%	6%
13–14 Aug	YouGov	1,660	35%	24%	—N/a	41%	11%
8–9 Aug	YouGov/The Times	1,674	36%	22%	—N/a	39%	14%
30–31 July	YouGov/The Times	1,718	32%	25%	—N/a	40%	7%
22–23 July	YouGov	1,650	32%	26%	—N/a	39%	6%
16–17 July	YouGov	1,657	33%	25%	—N/a	38%	8%
10–13 July	Opinium	2,005	29%	25%	36%	10%	4%
8–9 July	YouGov	1,657	33%	25%	—N/a	38%	8%
10–13 July	Opinium	2,005	29%	25%	36%	10%	4%
8–9 July	YouGov / The Times	1,669	34%	27%	—N/a	36%	7%
3–4 July	YouGov / The Times	1,641	35%	25%	—N/a	37%	10%
25–26 Jun	YouGov / The Times	1,645	38%	26%	—N/a	34%	12%
18–19 Jun	YouGov	1,606	38%	26%	—N/a	34%	12%
11–12 Jun	YouGov	1,638	39%	24%	—N/a	37%	15%
5–7 Jun	Opinium	2,005	35%	25%	29%	11%	10%
4–5 Jun	YouGov	1,619	37%	24%	—N/a	37%	13%
28–29 May	YouGov	1,670	38%	27%	—N/a	35%	11%
20–21 May	YouGov	1,660	37%	27%	—N/a	35%	10%
15–16 May	Opinium	2,009	36%	23%	30%	10%	13%
13–14 May	YouGov/The Times	1,634	40%	25%	—N/a	35%	15%
8–9 May	YouGov/The Times	1,648	39%	25%	—N/a	36%	14%
30 Apr – 1 May	YouGov/The Times	1,595	37%	27%	—N/a	36%	10%
16–17 Apr	YouGov/The Times	1,631	39%	25%	—N/a	35%	14%
14 Apr	Survation	2,060	43%	30%	—N/a	28%	13%
10–12 Apr	Opinium	2,008	36%	24%	31%	9%	12%
9–10 Apr	YouGov	1,639	37%	26%	—N/a	37%	11%
4–5 Apr	YouGov	1,662	39%	26%	—N/a	35%	13%
26–27 Mar	YouGov	1,659	38%	27%	—N/a	35%	11%
13–15 Mar	Opinium/The Observer	2,001	34%	26%	29%	11%	8%
5–6 Mar	YouGov	1,641	36%	29%	—N/a	35%	7%
26–27 Feb	YouGov	1,622	36%	30%	—N/a	33%	6%
19–20 Feb	YouGov/The Times	1,650	36%	29%	—N/a	35%	7%
12–13 Feb	YouGov/The Times	1,539	36%	29%	—N/a	35%	7%
6–9 Feb	BMG Research	1,507	32%	30%	—N/a	38%	2%
6–8 Feb	Opinium/The Observer	2,002	34%	28%	28%	10%	6%
5–6 Feb	YouGov/The Times	2,000	37%	29%	—N/a	33%	8%
28–29 Jan	YouGov/The Times	1,669	35%	29%	—N/a	36%	6%
16–17 Jan	YouGov	1,672	36%	31%	—N/a	33%	5%
11–12 Jan	Opinium	2,008	33%	28%	29%	11%	5%
7–8 Jan	YouGov	1,663	37%	31%	—N/a	31%	6%

==== 2017 ====
Date(s) conducted	Polling organisation/client	Sample size	Theresa May	Jeremy Corbyn	None of these	Don't know	Lead
19–20 Dec	YouGov	1,610	37%	31%	—N/a	32%	6%
12–14 Dec	Opinium	1,680	34%	28%	27%	11%	6%
9–10 Dec	YouGov	1,680	37%	28%	—N/a	35%	9%
5–8 Dec	BMG Research	1,509	32%	33%	—N/a	38%	1%
4–5 Dec	YouGov	1,638	34%	30%	—N/a	36%	4%
29 Nov – 1 Dec	ICM Research	2,050	40%	32%	—N/a	28%	8%
14–16 Nov	Opinium	2,003	34%	29%	27%	10%	5%
7–8 Nov	YouGov/The Times	2,012	34%	31%	—N/a	35%	3%
10–11 Oct	YouGov/The Times	1,680	33%	33%	—N/a	35%	Tie
6–8 Oct	ICM/The Guardian	2,052	41%	32%	—N/a	27%	9%
4–6 Oct	Opinium/Observer	2,009	32%	29%	28%	11%	3%
4–5 Oct	YouGov/The Times	1,615	36%	33%	—N/a	32%	3%
26–29 Sep	BMG Research	1,910	30%	32%	—N/a	38%	2%
22–24 Sep	YouGov/The Times	1,716	37%	29%	—N/a	33%	8%
19–22 Sep	Opinium/Observer	2,004	36%	26%	28%	10%	10%
15–18 Sep	Ipsos MORI	1,023	45%	38%	10%	6%	7%
12–15 Sep	Opinium/Observer	2,009	36%	28%	26%	11%	8%
30–31 Aug	YouGov/The Times	1,658	37%	32%	—N/a	31%	5%
21–22 Aug	YouGov/The Times	1,664	37%	33%	—N/a	31%	4%
15–18 Aug	Opinium/Observer	1,256	34%	30%	27%	9%	4%
7–11 Aug	BMG/The Independent	1,512	32%	33%	26%	10%	1%
31 Jul – 1 Aug	YouGov/The Times	1,665	36%	33%	—N/a	31%	3%
18–19 Jul	YouGov/The Times	1,593	37%	32%	—N/a	30%	5%
14–18 Jul	Ipsos MORI	1,071	46%	38%	10%	6%	8%
14–15 Jul	Survation/Mail on Sunday	1,024	43%	35%	—N/a	21%	8%
11–14 Jul	Opinium/Observer	2,013	36%	33%	22%	9%	3%
10–11 Jul	YouGov/The Sunday Times	1,700	38%	33%	—N/a	29%	5%
28–30 Jun	Survation	1,017	44%	38%	—N/a	19%	6%
27–29 Jun	Opinium/Observer	2,010	35%	34%	23%	8%	1%
21–22 Jun	YouGov/The Times	1,670	34%	35%	—N/a	30%	1%
9–10 Jun	YouGov/The Sunday Times	1,720	39%	39%	—N/a	22%	Tie

=== Hypothetical polling ===
2018

Date(s) conducted	Polling organisation/client	Sample size	Theresa May	John Major	Neither	Don't Know	Lead
23–24 July	YouGov	1,627	26%	25%	37%	11%	1%

Date(s) conducted	Polling organisation/client	Sample size	David Cameron	Theresa May	Neither	Don't Know	Lead
23–24 July	YouGov	1,627	28%	22%	41%	9%	6%

Date(s) conducted	Polling organisation/client	Sample size	Theresa May	Tony Blair	Neither	Don't Know	Lead
23–24 July	YouGov	1,627	31%	26%	35%	9%	5%

Date(s) conducted	Polling organisation/client	Sample size	Theresa May	Gordon Brown	Neither	Don't Know	Lead
23–24 July	YouGov	1,627	32%	25%	35%	9%	7%

2017

Date(s) conducted	Polling organisation/client	Sample size	David Davis	Amber Rudd	Don't Know	Lead
31 Aug–1 Sep	Survation/The Mail on Sunday	1,046	28%	19%	53%	9%

Date(s) conducted	Polling organisation/client	Sample size	David Davis	Jacob Rees-Mogg	Don't Know	Lead
31 Aug–1 Sep	Survation/The Mail on Sunday	1,046	26%	19%	55%	7%

Date(s) conducted	Polling organisation/client	Sample size	Boris Johnson	David Davis	Don't Know	Lead
31 Aug–1 Sep	Survation/The Mail on Sunday	1,046	30%	28%	42%	2%

Date(s) conducted	Polling organisation/client	Sample size	Boris Johnson	Amber Rudd	Don't Know	Lead
31 Aug–1 Sep	Survation/The Mail on Sunday	1,046	32%	25%	43%	7%

Date(s) conducted	Polling organisation/client	Sample size	Boris Johnson	Jacob Rees-Mogg	Don't Know	Lead
31 Aug–1 Sep	Survation/The Mail on Sunday	1,046	29%	26%	45%	3%

== Most trusted to negotiate Brexit ==
Some opinion pollsters ask voters which party leader they trust most to negotiate the best Brexit deal for Britain. The questions vary:

- Survation: "Which of the following party leaders do you trust the most to negotiate the best deal for Britain leaving the EU?"
- YouGov: "Who would you trust most to negotiate Britain's exit from the European Union?"
- ICM: "For each of the following challenges facing Britain, who would you trust most to do the best job: Theresa May or Jeremy Corbyn? (Negotiating a good Brexit deal for the UK)"

=== Johnson vs Corbyn ===
==== 2019 ====
Date(s) conducted	Polling organisation/client	Sample size	Johnson	Corbyn	Neither	Don't know	Lead
6–9 Nov	Deltapoll	1,518	50%	27%	—N/a	23%	23%
7–8 Nov	YouGov	1,598	36%	12%	10%	28% Others Jo Swinson 15%	21%
31 Oct–2 Nov	Deltapoll	2,004	51%	26%	—N/a	23%	25%
31 Oct–1 Nov	YouGov	1,598	36%	12%	11%	26% Others Jo Swinson 15%	21%
30 Oct–1 Nov	Opinium	2,004	25%	12%	15% Others Liberal Democrat 12% Brexit Party 11% Green 2% SNP 3% UKIP 1% Plaid Cymru 0% Other 1% Change 0%	17%	13%

=== May vs Corbyn ===
==== 2018 ====
Date(s) conducted	Polling organisation/client	Sample size	Theresa May	Jeremy Corbyn	Both equally	Neither	Don't know	Lead
20–22 Jul	ICM Research	2,010	26%	18%	—N/a	44%	15%	8%
19–20 June	YouGov	1,663	32%	14%	3%	38%	12%	18%
15–16 May	Opinium	2,009	33%	20%	—N/a	TBC	TBC	13%
12–14 Jan	ICM Research	2,027	35%	19%	—N/a	31%	15%	16%

==== 2017 ====
Date(s) conducted	Polling organisation/client	Sample size	Theresa May	Jeremy Corbyn	Both equally	Neither	Don't know	Lead
23–24 Oct	YouGov	1,637	32%	17%	3%	33%	15%	15%
22–24 Sep	ICM Research/The Guardian	1,968	32%	18%	—N/a	34%	15%	12%
22–24 Sep	YouGov/The Times	1,716	31%	18%	3%	35%	14%	13%
12–13 Sep	YouGov	TBC	33%	20%	3%	32%	12%	13%
14–15 Jul	Survation/Mail on Sunday	1,024	42%	33%	—N/a	—N/a	25%	9%
28–30 Jun	Survation	1,025	51%	35%	—N/a	—N/a	15%	16%
17 Jun	Survation/Good Morning Britain	1,005	52%	39%	—N/a	—N/a	10%	13%

=== May vs Corbyn vs Cable ===
==== 2017 ====
Date(s) conducted	Polling organisation/client	Sample size	Theresa May	Jeremy Corbyn	Vince Cable	Don't know	Lead
23 Sep	Survation/Mail on Sunday	1,024	39%	27%	9%	26%	12%

=== Hypothetical polling ===
Hypothetical polling

Date(s) conducted	Polling organisation/client	Sample size	Theresa May	Jeremy Corbyn	Boris Johnson	Philip Hammond	Don't know	Lead
6–8 Oct 2017	ICM Research	1,024	26%	22%	16%	7%	29%	4%

Date(s) conducted	Polling organisation/client	Sample size	Theresa May	Boris Johnson	Don't Know	Lead
23 Sep 2017	Survation/The Mail on Sunday	1,174	38%	25%	37%	13%

== Prime Minister and Chancellor of the Exchequer ==
Some opinion pollsters ask voters which party leader and Chancellor/Shadow Chancellor they trust most to manage the economy. The questions vary:

- ICM (29 July 2019): "For each of the following challenges facing Britain, who would you trust most to do the best job - Theresa May/Boris Johnson or Jeremy Corbyn? (Managing the economy properly)"
- ICM: " Irrespective of which party you support, which of the teams below do you think is better able to manage the economy properly?"
- Opinium: " Which, if any, of the following would you say you trust more to handle the economy?"
- YouGov: "Which government do you think would be better for managing the economy?"
- Deltapoll: "Putting aside any support for a political party you may have, which of the following do you think would be best for the British economy?"

=== During the Johnson ministry ===
==== 2019 ====
Date(s) conducted	Polling organisation/client	Sample size	Johnson & Javid	Corbyn & McDonnell	Neither	Don't know	Lead
6–9 Nov	Deltapoll	1,518	48%	28%	—N/a	24%	20%
7–8 Nov	YouGov	1,598	34%	16%	16%	27% Others Liberal Democrat 7%	18%
6–8 Nov	Panelbase	1,046	46%	21%	—N/a	25%	25%
31 Oct–2 Nov	Deltapoll	2,004	47%	28%	—N/a	25%	19%
31 Oct–1 Nov	YouGov	1,598	34%	17%	18%	25% Others Liberal Democrat 7%	17%
30 Oct–1 Nov	Opinium	2,004	32%	16%	12% Others Liberal Democrat 8% Brexit Party 4% Green 3% SNP 2% UKIP 1% Plaid Cymru 1% Other 1% Change 0%	12%	16%
30 Oct–1 Nov	Opinium	2,004	39%	21%	13%	27%	18%
25–27 Jul	Deltapoll	2,001	48%	25%	—N/a	28%	23%

=== During the May ministry ===
==== 2019 ====
Date(s) conducted	Polling organisation/client	Sample size	May & Hammond	Corbyn & McDonnell	Neither	Don't know	Lead
21–22 Feb	Deltapoll	1,027	46%	28%	—N/a	26%	18%
8-11 Feb	Deltapoll	2,004	45%	31%	—N/a	24%	14%

==== 2018 ====
Date(s) conducted	Polling organisation/client	Sample size	May & Hammond	Corbyn & McDonnell	Neither	Don't know	Lead
20–22 Jul	ICM Research	2,010	35%	22%	30%	13%	13%
12–14 Jul	Deltapoll	1,484	39%	36%	—N/a	26%	3%
12–14 Jan	ICM Research	2,027	36%	24%	27%	14%	12%

==== 2017 ====
Date(s) conducted	Polling organisation/client	Sample size	May & Hammond	Corbyn & McDonnell	Neither	Don't know	Lead
12–14 Dec	Opinium	2,005	37%	28%	24%	12%	9%
24–26 Nov	ICM Research	2,029	36%	28%	26%	10%	8%
22–23 Nov	YouGov / The Times	1,644	37%	21%	22%	20%	16%
14–16 Nov	Opinium	2,032	36%	28%	24%	12%	8%
23–24 Oct	ICM/The Guardian	2,022	39%	26%	23%	11%	13%

=== Best Chancellor of the Exchequer ===
Some opinion pollsters ask voters which politician would make the best Chancellor of the Exchequer. The questions vary:

- YouGov: "Which of these would make the better Chancellor of the Exchequer?"
- Ipsos MORI: "Who do you think would make the most capable Chancellor, the Conservative’s Phillip Hammond/Sajid Javid, or Labour’s John McDonnell?"

==== Hammond vs McDonnell (2018) ====
Date(s) conducted	Polling organisation/client	Sample size	Philip Hammond	John McDonnell	Neither	Don't know	Lead
24–28 Nov	Ipsos MORI	1,003	41%	32%	8%	19%	9%
22–23 Nov	YouGov / The Times	1,644	23%	13%	—N/a	64%	10%
19–20 Nov	YouGov	1,677	20%	12%	—N/a	68%	8%

== See also ==
- Opinion polling for the 2024 United Kingdom general election
- 2024 United Kingdom general election
