= 2018 UK Independence Party leadership election =

United Kingdom independence party (UKIP) leadership election

- 14 April 2018
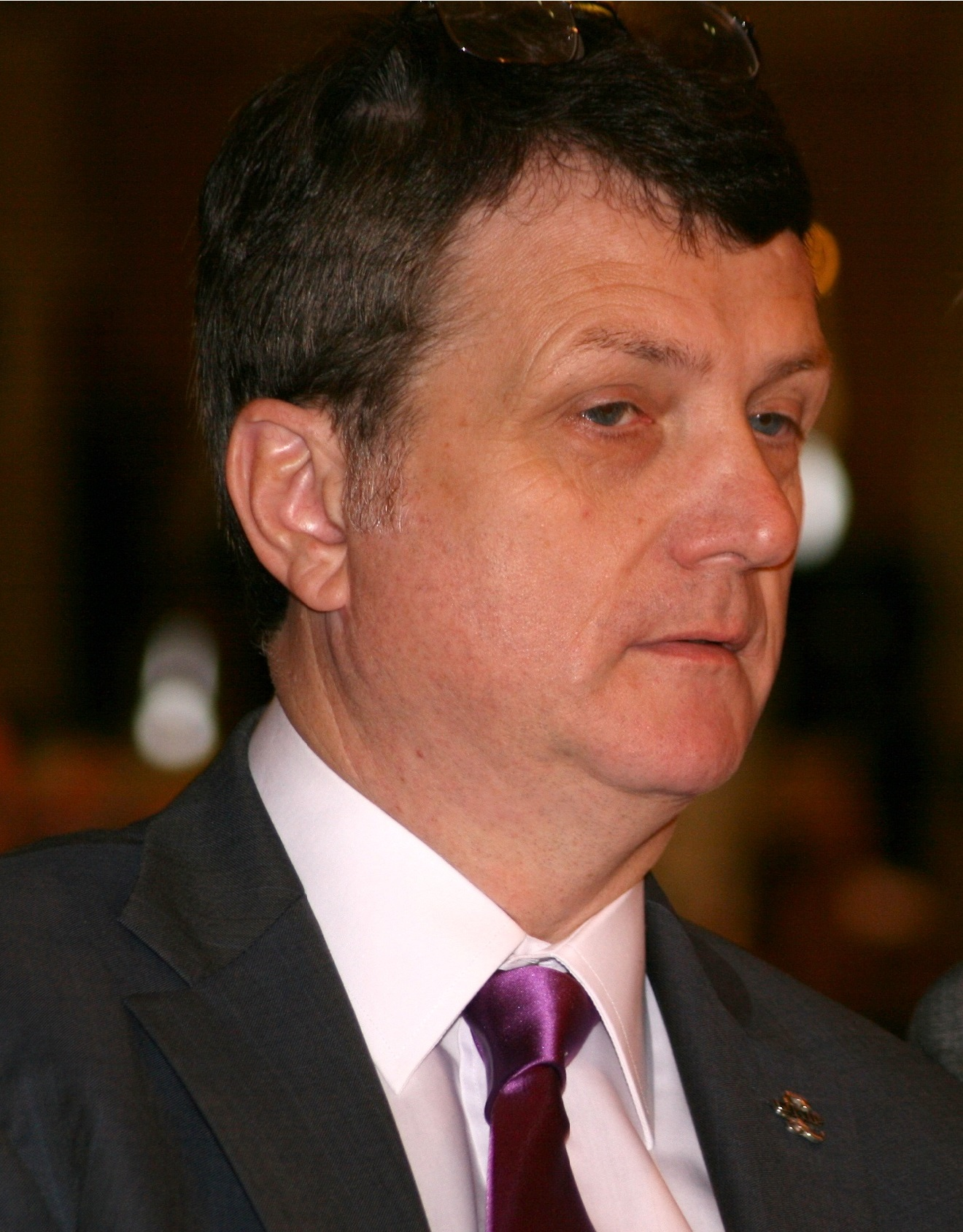
Candidate	Gerard Batten
Percentage	Unopposed
Leader before election
Gerard Batten (interim);
previously Henry Bolton
Elected Leader
Gerard Batten

The 2018 UK Independence Party leadership election was triggered after members voted to remove Henry Bolton as leader of the UK Independence Party at an extraordinary general meeting held in Birmingham on 17 February 2018. It was the fourth UKIP leadership election in eighteen months. Interim leader Gerard Batten was ultimately elected unopposed as the party's new leader.

== Background ==
After the UK's referendum on EU membership in June 2016 resulted in a vote to leave the European Union, then-leader of UKIP Nigel Farage announced his resignation. In September 2016, Diane James was elected to succeed him, but resigned after 18 days, triggering another leadership election. Held in November 2016, it was won by Paul Nuttall. Nuttall led the party into the 2017 UK general election, but resigned after UKIP's vote share fell from 12.6% to 1.8% and the party failed to win any parliamentary seats.

Henry Bolton was elected to succeed Nuttall in September 2017. In January 2018, UKIP's NEC passed a motion of no confidence in Bolton, following controversy about his personal life. Bolton refused to step down, which triggered an emergency general meeting. This meeting was held on 17 February 2018, and those attending voted by 867 votes to 500 to remove him as leader. Gerard Batten took over as interim leader and the leadership election had to be held within 90 days, before 18 May 2018.

Bill Etheridge, an MEP who had twice stood for the leadership previously, initially announced his intention to stand again, but then withdrew to support Batten.

Batten proposed, in order to avoid the expense of a leadership election, that he be elected uncontested to serve a 12-month term. The Guardian understood that the party was trying to ensure an uncontested leadership election by raising financial and membership requirements.

== Candidates ==
=== Declared ===
- Gerard Batten, acting UKIP leader; UKIP Exiting the EU Spokesperson; MEP for London; leadership candidate in 2009

=== Withdrew ===
- Bill Etheridge, MEP for the West Midlands; 2017; leadership candidate in September 2016 and November 2016

=== Declined ===
- Tim Aker, UKIP MEP for the East of England; Thurrock Independents councillor
- Henry Bolton, former UKIP leader (left party)
- Nigel Farage, former UKIP leader; MEP for South East England
- Mike Hookem, UKIP Fisheries Spokesperson; MEP for Yorkshire and the Humber
- David Kurten, UKIP Education Spokesperson; member of the London Assembly; leadership candidate in November 2016 and 2017

== Result ==
Batten was elected unopposed, and announced he would resign in 12 months' time.
