= Oliver Kamm =

British journalist and writer (born 1963)

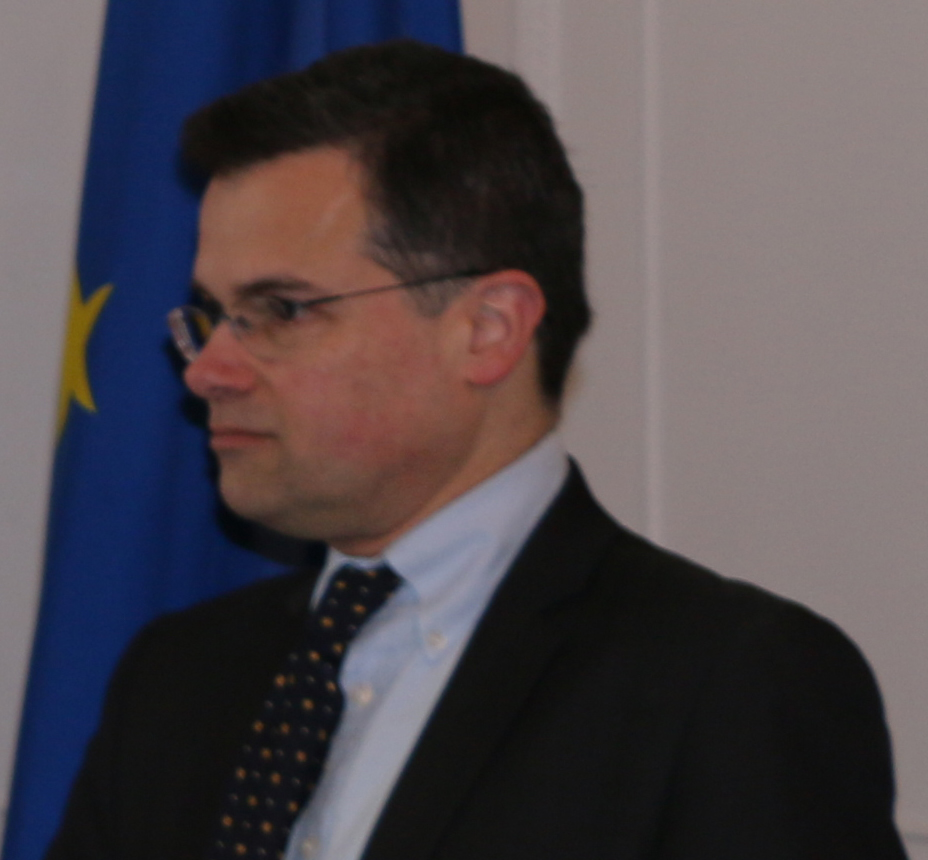
- Kamm in January 2015
- Born: 1963 (age 62–63)
- Education: New College, Oxford; Birkbeck College
- Occupation: Journalist
- Years active: 2008–present
- Employer: The Times
- Parent(s): Antony Kamm (father); Anthea Bell (mother)
- Relatives: Adrian Bell (grandfather); Martin Bell (uncle)

Oliver Kamm (born 1963) is a British journalist and writer who was a leader writer and columnist for The Times.

== Early life and career ==
Kamm is the son of translator Anthea Bell and publisher Antony Kamm. Kamm is the grandson of Adrian Bell and nephew of Martin Bell. Although his mother was not Jewish, he is Jewish on his father's side. He studied at New College, Oxford He began his career at the Bank of England and worked in the securities industry and investment banking.

== Career ==
Kamm joined the Times staff in 2008. He has also contributed to The Jewish Chronicle, Prospect magazine, and The Guardian.

== Views ==
Kamm was a consistent supporter of former British Prime Minister Tony Blair and the foreign policies of his government. According to John Lloyd in 2005, Kamm viewed Blair's policies "as the expression of true social-democratic values". At its launch in 2005, Kamm subscribed to the founding principles of the Henry Jackson Society and was an initial signatory.

In 2006 Oliver Kamm wrote a blog post titled "The Islamophobia Scam" in which he said "if any reader wishes to nominate me [for an "Islamophobia" award] and I am successful, you can be sure I'll turn up to collect the award and express my reasons for pride in it. He states that he is a friend and admirer of Israel, "whose pluralist ethos will be fulfilled when there is an eventual two-state solution with a sovereign Palestine". Kamm was an opponent of Jeremy Corbyn's leadership of the Labour Party. He told Liam Hoare, writing for The Forward magazine in September 2015, that "the left has incorporated the attitudes of the nativist far-right. Corbyn's alliances with reactionary, misogynistic, theocratic, and anti-Semitic movements bear out what we’ve said".

Commentator Peter Wilby stated that, although Kamm and Stephen Pollard of the Jewish Chronicle claim "to be left-wing", they hold "no discernible left-wing views". When interviewed by politics academic Norman Geras in 2003, Kamm said that he wrote to "express a militant liberalism that I feel ought to be part of public debate but which isn't often articulated, or at least not where I can find it, in the communications media that I read or listen to" and that he felt that "the crucial distinction in politics is not between Left and Right, as I had once tribally thought, but between the defenders and the enemies of an open society."

Kamm has been accused of expressing anti-Catholic views for his remarks towards Catholic Labour MP Rebecca Long-Bailey.

In 2007, he criticized Wikipedia, saying that its articles usually are dominated by the loudest and most persistent editorial voices or by an interest group with an ideological "axe to grind".

In September 2021, Kamm called for Labour leader Keir Starmer to shut down Young Labour. The reasons cited by Kamm included an accusation that Young Labour members using the historic Palestinian slogan From the river to the sea, Palestine will be free, in support of Palestinian liberation, means support of a "second Holocaust against the Jewish people".

== Personal life ==
Kamm has described his marriage as "caring but unsuitable", and after it ended he was a single parent for their two young children. He had a subsequent three-year relationship.

== Books ==
Kamm has written three books. In Anti-Totalitarianism, he argued that military intervention against totalitarian regimes to support democratic values in other countries, can be expression of left wing values; he supported the 2003 invasion of Iraq under this rubric and seemed to focus his argument against foreign policies stances based narrowly on the national interest that are typical of the traditional right. In a review, Nicholas Marsh wrote that Kamm "fails to provide a definition of the totalitarianism he opposes. ... [H]e also fails to provide any sense of how one should weigh the benefits of democratization against the inevitable costs of warfare". On his book on usage, Accidence Will Happen, he argued against linguistic prescription and in favour of linguistic description.

In August 2018, The Bookseller reported on Kamm's book In Mending the Mind: The Art and Science of Treating Clinical Depression, in which he "draws on his own experience of the illness as a jumping off point to investigate depression" and "makes a case for embracing both art and science to better understand and treat the condition."

=== Bibliography ===
- Kamm, Oliver (2005). Anti-totalitarianism: The Left-wing Case for a Neoconservative Foreign Policy. Social Affairs Unit. ISBN 978-1780227955.
- Kamm, Oliver (2015). Accidence Will Happen: The Non-Pedantic Guide to English Usage. Phoenix. ISBN 978-1780227955.
- Kamm, Oliver (2021). Mending the Mind: The Art and Science of Overcoming Clinical Depression. Weidenfeld & Nicolson. ISBN 978-1474610827.
