= Anthea Bell =

English translator (1936–2018)

Anthea Bell OBE
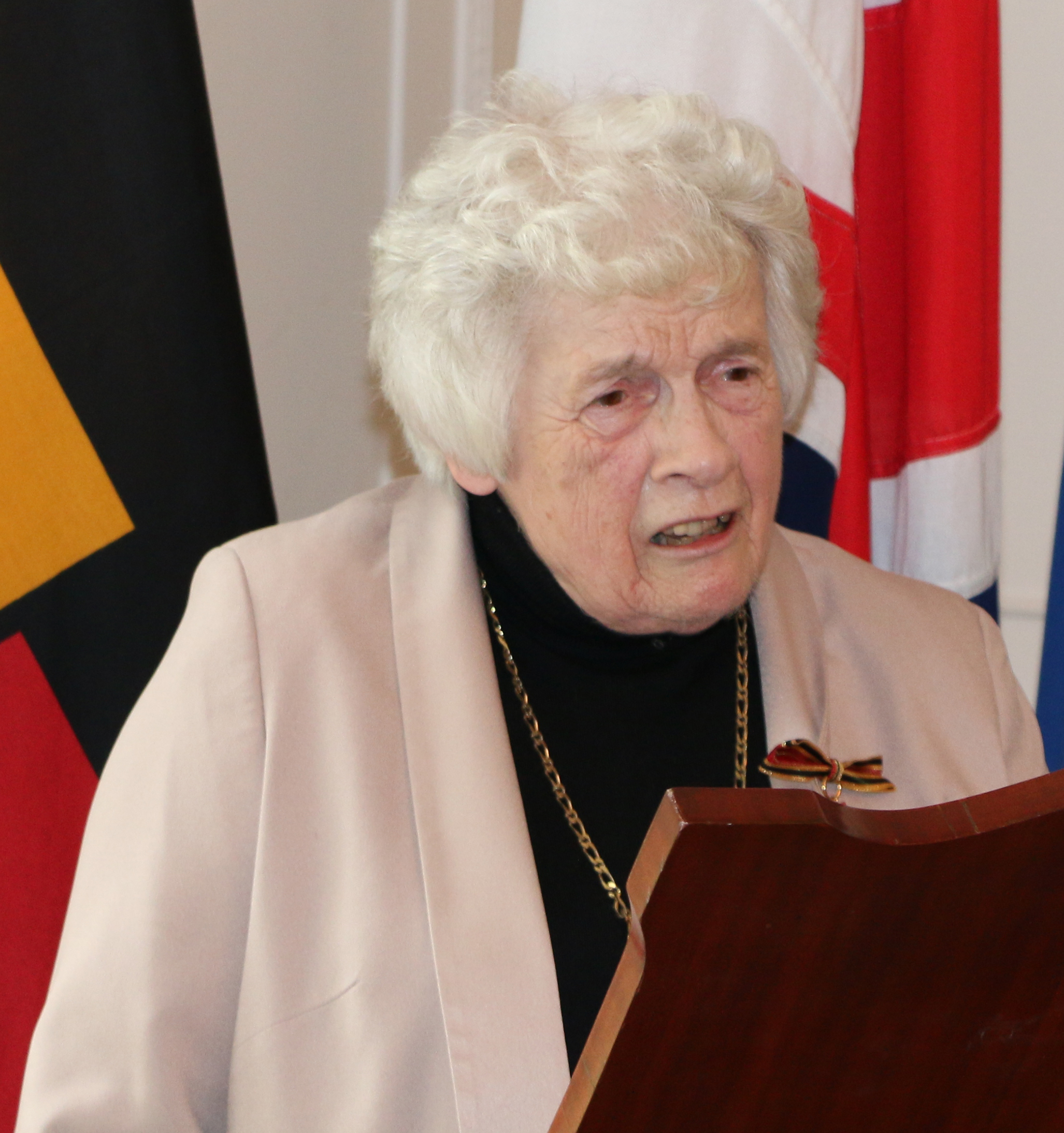
- Bell in January 2015
- Born: 10 May 1936; Suffolk, England
- Died: 18 October 2018 (aged 82); Cambridge, England
- Education: Somerville College, University of Oxford
- Occupation: Translator
- Years active: 1960–2015
- Known for: Asterix stories translation
- Spouse: Antony Kamm (m. 1957; div. 1973)
- Children: 2; including Oliver
- Father: Adrian Bell
- Relatives: Martin Bell (brother)

Anthea Bell (10 May 1936 – 18 October 2018) was an English translator of literary works, including children's literature, from French, German and Danish. These include The Castle by Franz Kafka, Austerlitz by W. G. Sebald, the Inkworld trilogy by Cornelia Funke and the French Asterix comics with co-translator Derek Hockridge.

== Biography ==
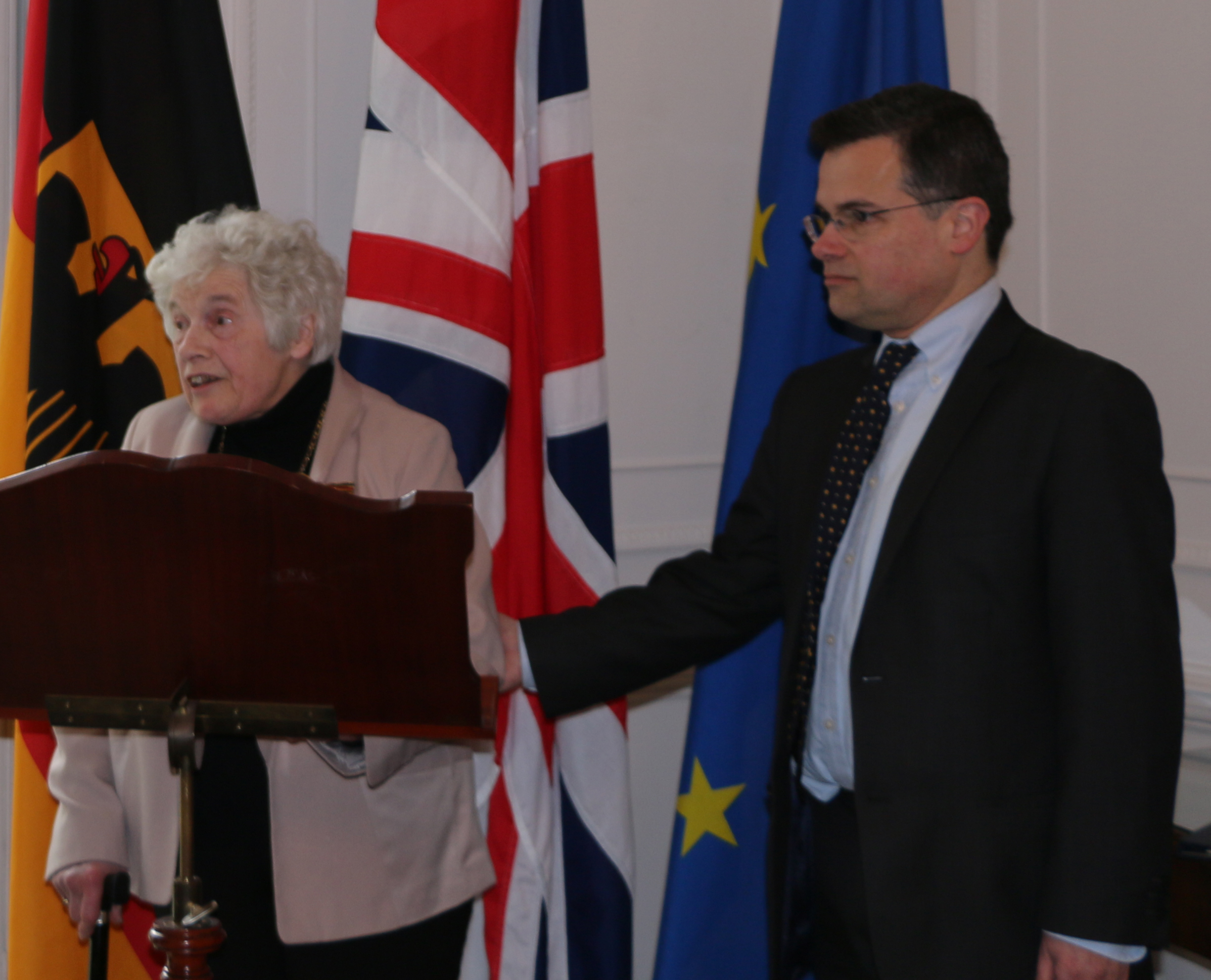
Anthea Bell with her son Oliver Kamm in 2015

Bell was born in Suffolk on 10 May 1936. According to her own accounts, she picked up lateral thinking abilities essential in a translator from her father Adrian Bell, Suffolk author and the first Times cryptic crossword setter. Her mother, Marjorie Bell (née Gibson), was a home maker. The couple's son, Bell's brother, Martin, is a former BBC correspondent who was an independent Member of Parliament for one parliamentary term.

After attending a boarding school in Bournemouth, she read English at Somerville College, Oxford. She was married to the publisher and writer Antony Kamm from 1957 to 1973; the couple had two sons, Richard and Oliver. Oliver Kamm is a leader writer for The Times. After her sons left home, she lived and worked in Cambridge. She died on 18 October 2018, aged 82.

== Works ==
Anthea Bell's career as a translator began at the end of the 1950s when the German publisher Klaus Flugge asked Antony Kamm if he knew anyone able to translate Der kleine Wassermann, a book for children by Otfried Preussler. Kamm recommended his wife; Bell's English version entitled The Little Water Sprite was published in 1960. Eventually, she translated 11 of Preussler's works.

Over the decades, Bell translated numerous Franco-Belgian comics of the bande dessinée genre into English, including Asterix – for which her new puns were praised for keeping the original French spirit intact. Peter Hunt, now Professor Emeritus in Children's Literature at Cardiff University, has written of her "ingenious translations" of the French originals which "in a way display the art of the translator at its best". Other comic books she has translated include Le Petit Nicolas, Lieutenant Blueberry, and Iznogoud.

She specialised in translating children's literature, and re-translated Hans Christian Andersen's fairytales from Danish for the publishing house of G. P. Putnam's Sons. She also translated the Inkworld trilogy by Cornelia Funke and the Ruby Red Trilogy by Kerstin Gier. Other works include The Princess and the Captain (2006), translated from La Princetta et le Capitaine by Anne-Laure Bondoux.

Bell also translated into English many adult novels, as well as some books on art history, and musicology. She translated W. G. Sebald's Austerlitz (plus other works by Sebald), and Władysław Szpilman's memoir The Pianist (translated, at the author's request, from the German version). Her translations of works by Stefan Zweig have been said to have helped restore his reputation among anglophone readers, and that of E. T. A. Hoffmann's The Life and Opinions of the Tomcat Murr (originally Lebensansichten des Katers Murr) has had a positive effect on Hoffman's profile as well. In addition, Penguin Classics published Bell's new translation of Sigmund Freud's The Psychopathology of Everyday Life in 2003. Oxford University Press published her translation of Kafka's The Castle in 2009.

She contributed an essay titled "Translation: Walking the Tightrope of Illusion" to a 2006 book, The Translator as Writer, in which she explained her preference for 'invisible' translation whereby she creates the illusion that readers are not reading a translation "but the real thing".

Bell was appointed Officer of the Order of the British Empire (OBE) in the 2010 New Year Honours for her services to literature and literary translations.

In 2014, Bell faithfully retranslated Erich Kästner's 1949 German children's novel Das doppelte Lottchen into English as The Parent Trap, after Disney's popular film adaptation of the book. Bell's translation was published in the United Kingdom and Australia by Pushkin Press, replacing Cyrus Brooks' 1962 English translation, which is still published in the United States and Canada as Lisa and Lottie. In 2020, Australian actress Ruby Rees recorded an unabridged narration of Bell's translation for Bolinda.

Bell received the German Federal Republic's Cross of Merit in 2015.

== Illness and death ==
In a December 2017 newspaper column, Bell's son Oliver Kamm revealed that his mother had entered a nursing home due to illness a year earlier, and "her great mind has now departed". As a result of her forced retirement, the 37th book in the Asterix series, Asterix and the Chariot Race (published in October 2017), was translated by Adriana Hunter. The end of the book has a message of thanks from the publishers to Bell for "her wonderful translation work on Asterix over the years".

Bell died on 18 October 2018 at the age of 82.

== Notable awards ==
- 1987 – Schlegel-Tieck Prize for Hans Bemmann's The Stone and the Flute
- 1996 – Marsh Award for Children's Literature in Translation – for Christine Nöstlinger's A Dog's Life translated from German
- 2002 – Helen and Kurt Wolff Translator's Prize, Goethe Institute – for W. G. Sebald's Austerlitz
- 2002 – Independent Foreign Fiction Prize – for W. G. Sebald's Austerlitz
- 2002 – Schlegel-Tieck Prize for W. G. Sebald's Austerlitz
- 2003 – Schlegel-Tieck Prize – for Karen Duve's Rain translated from German
- 2003 – Marsh Award for Children's Literature in Translation – for Hans Magnus Enzensberger's Where Were You Robert? translated from German
- 2007 – Marsh Award for Children's Literature in Translation – for Kai Meyer's The Flowing Queen translated from German
- 2009 – Oxford-Weidenfeld Translation Prize – for Saša Stanišić's How the Soldier Repairs the Gramophone
- 2009 – Schlegel-Tieck Prize for Stefan Zweig's Burning Secret
- 2017 – Eric Carle Museum Bridge Award for contributions to children's literature

=== Mildred L. Batchelder Award ===
The Mildred L. Batchelder Award is unusual in that it is given to a publisher yet it explicitly references a given work, its translator and its author. Its intent is to encourage the translation of children's works into English in order "to eliminate barriers to understanding between people of different cultures, races, nations, and languages".

Anthea Bell, translating from German, French and Danish, has been mentioned for more works than any other individual or organisation (including publishers) in the history of the award:

Year	Publisher	Title	Author	Translator	Original language	Citation
1976	Henry Z. Walck	The Cat and Mouse Who Shared a House	Ruth Hürlimann	Anthea Bell	German	Winner
1979	Franklin Watts, Inc.	Konrad	Christine Nöstlinger	Anthea Bell	German	Winner
1990	E. P. Dutton	Buster's World	Bjarne Reuter	Anthea Bell	Danish	Winner
1995	E. P. Dutton	The Boys from St.Petri	Bjarne Reuter	Anthea Bell	Danish	Winner
2006	Phaidon Press Limited	Nicholas	René Goscinny	Anthea Bell	French	Honor
2008	Phaidon Press	Nicholas and the Gang	René Goscinny	Anthea Bell	French	Honor
2009	Amulet Books	Tiger Moon	Antonia Michaelis	Anthea Bell	German	Honor
