= Tatton in the 1997 general election =

UK parliamentary constituency

- 1 May 1997

Tatton constituency
- Turnout: 76.1% (▼4.7%)
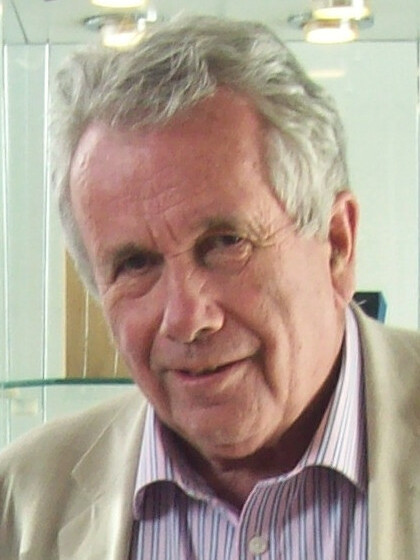

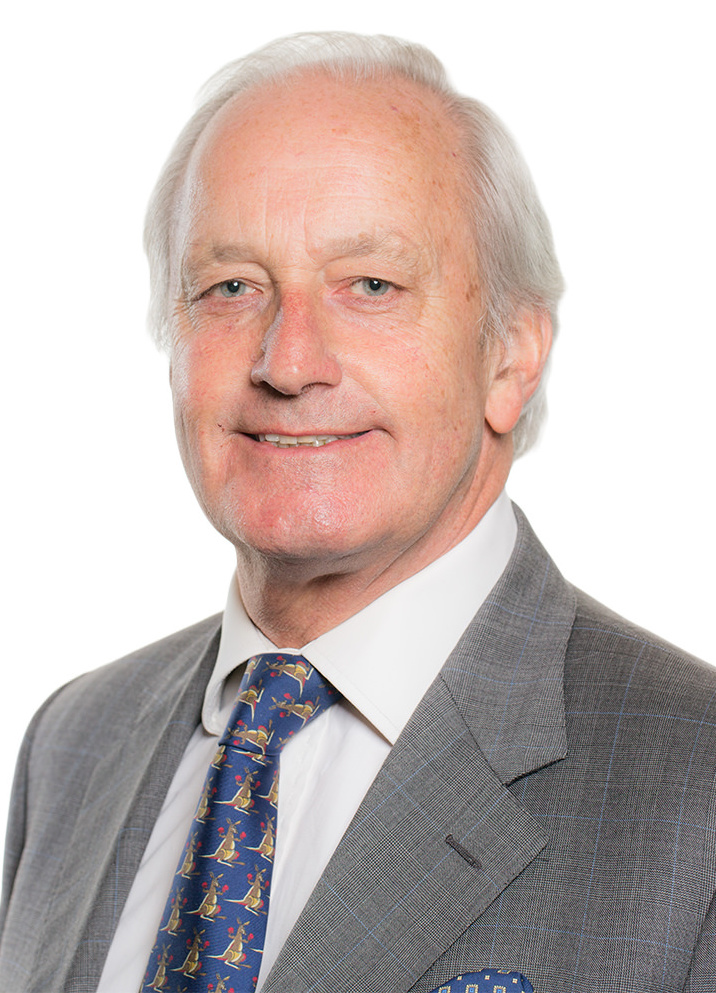
	First party	Second party
Candidate	Martin Bell	Neil Hamilton
Party	Independent	Conservative
Popular vote	29,354	18,277
Percentage	60.2%	37.5%
Swing	New	▼17.6%
MP before election
Neil Hamilton
Conservative
Elected MP
Martin Bell
Independent

Tatton in the 1997 general election was one of the UK's highest-profile constituencies. In what was previously one of the safest Conservative seats in the country, Independent candidate, Martin Bell managed to take the seat from the sitting Conservative MP, Neil Hamilton.

== Previous result ==
The Conservative majority at the 1992 general election had been almost 16,000 votes. Boundary changes that came into place in 1997 made the seat even safer still, and it was considered to be the fourth-safest Conservative seat in the country with an notional majority of over 22,000 had it existed in its new form in 1992.

The boundary changes for 1997 saw the removal of the town of Northwich, which had a large Labour-voting minority, to form the base of the new safe Labour constituency of Weaver Vale, and in its place brought in the affluent town of Alderley Edge, which was previously in the safely Conservative Macclesfield constituency held by Nicholas Winterton.

1992 notional result
Party	Vote	%
Conservative	32,235	62.18
Labour	9,870	19.04
Liberal Democrats	9,387	18.11
Others	350	0.68
Majority	22,365	43.1
Turnout	51,842	81.4

General election 1992: Tatton
Party	Candidate	Votes	%	±%
Conservative	Neil Hamilton	31,658	55.1	+0.5
Labour	Jonathan Kelly	15,798	27.5	+5.9
Liberal Democrats	Catherine Hancox	9,597	16.7	−6.9
Feudal Party	Michael Gibson	410	0.7	+0.2
Majority		15,860	27.6	−3.4
Turnout		57,463	80.8	+4.0
Conservative hold		Swing	−2.7	

== Hamilton's candidacy ==
The sitting MP, Neil Hamilton was implicated in the Cash for Questions for accepting money from Mohamed Al-Fayed. Hamilton was under investigation by the Parliamentary Standards Commissioner as part of the cash for questions enquiry and some party members thought he should stand down after the collapse of his case against The Guardian. Disquiet in the local association became public, but the majority gave him the benefit of the doubt. Hamilton resisted the pressure from senior Conservatives and Conservative Central Office to stand down. Jeremy Paxman states that Conservative Central Office "begged him not to stand, but in a gesture of overweening arrogance, he refused to go quietly."

On 8 April 1997, Hamilton was chosen as the Conservative candidate for Tatton (182 for, 35 against, 100 abstained). The Observer commissioned ICM polls in the constituencies of the three Conservative candidates tainted by scandal and seeking re-election: Hamilton, Allan Stewart and Piers Merchant. Both Stewart and Merchant were found to have support consistent with their party's standing, but in Tatton "there was massive hostility to Hamilton".

== Bell's candidacy ==
On 7 April 1997, twenty-four days before that year's British general election, Martin Bell, the BBC war correspondent, announced that he was leaving the BBC to stand as an independent candidate in the Tatton constituency in Cheshire. This was not a decision he took lightly as it had been made clear to him by then director general that upon resigning he would not be welcomed back. Labour and the Liberal Democrats withdrew their candidates in Bell's favour in a plan masterminded by Alastair Campbell, Tony Blair's press secretary. The two parties and some dissidents within the Conservative Party supported Bell's "anti-corruption" campaign with further celebrity backing from actor Alec Guinness; author John le Carré; football manager Alex Ferguson and singer Oran "Juice" Jones.

As part of his election platform, Bell had stated that he would serve for only one term, his specific purpose being to oppose Neil Hamilton separately stating that the only thing which could make him change his mind would be Hamilton being selected by the Tatton Conservative Party as a candidate for the next general election. Many of Tatton's constituents viewed their vote for Bell as a protest vote and were of the mind that he should stand down immediately as he had alluded to doing in order to force a by-election where the main party candidates would stand.

== Result ==
On 1 May 1997, Bell defeated Hamilton being elected as an MP with a majority of 11,077 votes, – and thus became the first successful independent parliamentary candidate since 1951. There was a swing of 48%. Hamilton came second.

Although Hamilton vowed to return to parliament, this defeat marked the end of his political career in the Conservative Party. In March 1999, George Osborne was selected by the Tatton Conservative Association to be their candidate for the following general election. Though he regretted making the pledge of saying he would serve for only one term, Bell stuck to his promise although he would later stand as an independent candidate against Eric Pickles in 2001.

General election 1997: Tatton
Party	Candidate	Votes	%	±%
Independent	Martin Bell	29,354	60.2	New
Conservative	Neil Hamilton	18,277	37.5	−17.6
Ind. Conservative	Sam Hill	295	0.6	New
Ind. Conservative	Simon Kinsey	184	0.4	New
Miss Moneypenny's Glamorous One Party	Burnel Penhaul	128	0.3	New
Albion Party	John Muir	126	0.3	New
Natural Law	Michael Kennedy	123	0.3	New
Lord Biro versus the Scallywag Tories	David Bishop	116	0.2	New
Ind. Conservative	Ralph Nicholas	113	0.2	New
Juice Party	Julian Price	73	0.1	New
Majority		11,077	22.7	
Turnout		48,792	76.1	−4.7
Independent gain from Conservative		Swing		
