= Tatton (constituency) =

UK Parliament constituency (since 1983)

Coordinates: 53.312°N 2.384°W

- County constituency for the House of Commons
- Interactive map of boundaries since 2024
- Location within North West England
- County: Cheshire
- Electorate: 75,538 (March 2020)
- Major settlements: Alderley Edge, Chelford, Handforth, High Legh, Knutsford, Lostock Gralam, Lymm, Mobberley, Plumley, Styal, Wilmslow, Wincham

Current constituency
- Created: 1983
- Member of Parliament: Esther McVey (Conservative)
- Seats: One
- Created from: Runcorn, Cheadle, Northwich and Knutsford

Tatton is a constituency (Note: A county constituency (for the purposes of election expenses and type of returning officer)) in Cheshire represented in the House of Commons of the UK Parliament since 2017 by Esther McVey, a Conservative. (Note: As with all constituencies, the constituency elects one Member of Parliament (MP) by the first past the post system of election at least every five years)

== Constituency profile ==
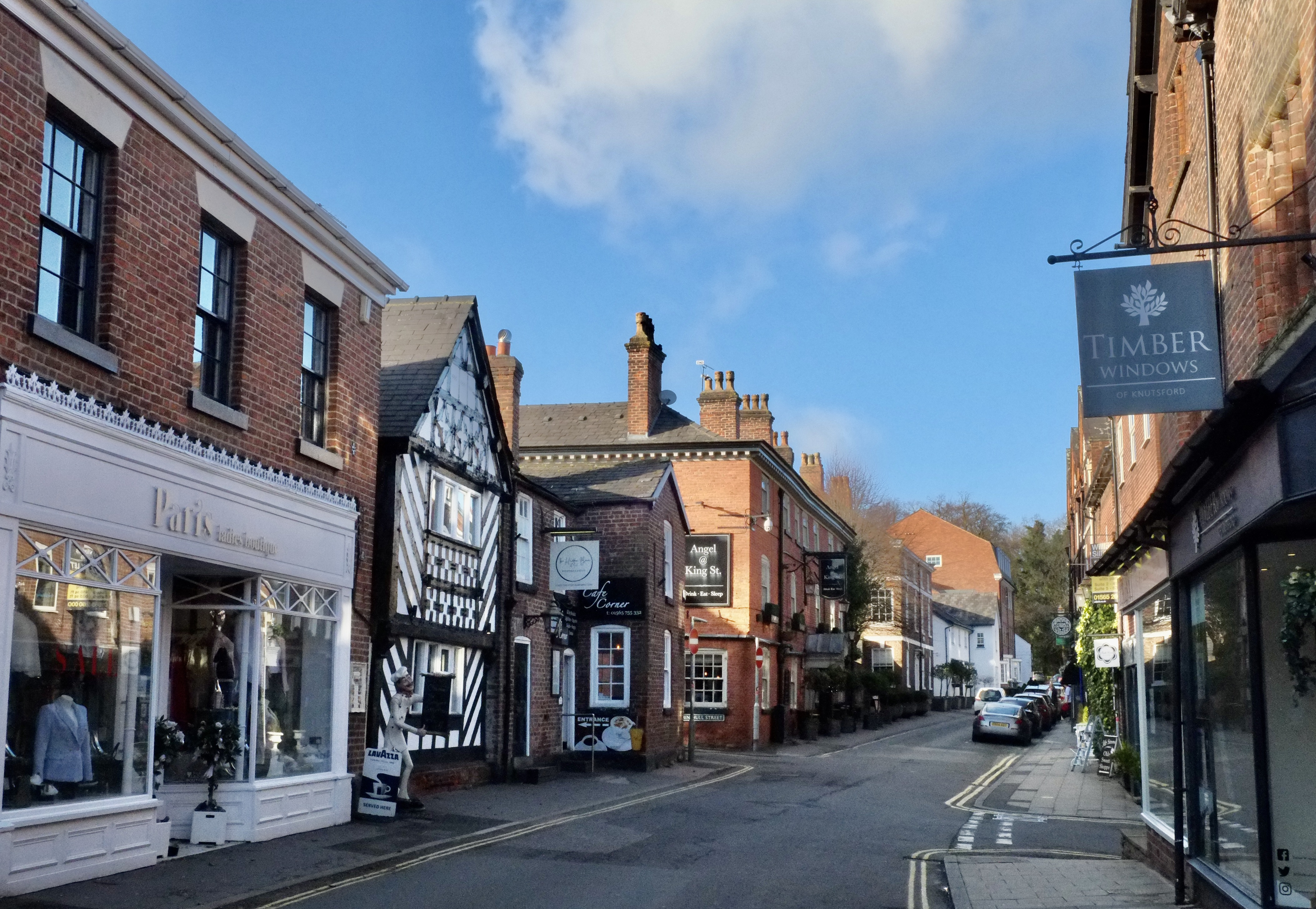
King Street, Knutsford

Tatton is a constituency in Cheshire in North West England, covering parts of the Cheshire East, Cheshire West and Chester and Borough of Warrington local authority areas. Its largest town is Wilmslow, which has a population of around 27,000. Other settlements include the towns of Knutsford and Handforth and the villages of Lymm, Alderley Edge and Barnton. The constituency is named after Tatton Park, a large, historic estate located just north of Knutsford.

The seat largely comprises prosperous villages and small towns, set amidst Cheshire countryside, featuring country parks, hills, recreation grounds and golf courses. This includes areas with the highest house prices in Northern England, and some of the wealthiest villages in the United Kingdom as a whole. The area was previously dominated by countryside; however, since the 1950s, it has developed a largely built-up, suburban character, being located on the fringes of Greater Manchester. Its proximity to Manchester, located around 11 miles (18 km) north of Wilmslow, means Tatton forms part of the commuter belt to the city. The constituency has very low levels of deprivation, with Wilmslow, Knutsford and Lymm being especially affluent. The average house price in Tatton is higher than the UK average and more than double the regional average.

Tatton has a large retired population and a low proportion of young adults. Residents have high levels of income and homeownership, and the child poverty rate is less than half the overall UK figure. Residents are generally well-educated and a high proportion work in professional occupations and in the science, technology and finance sectors. The percentage of residents claiming unemployment benefits is very low. White people made up 93% of the population at the 2021 census.

At the local council level, Wilmslow and Handforth are represented by independent councillors, Lymm by Liberal Democrats and the rest of the constituency by Conservatives. An estimated 55% of voters in Tatton supported remaining in the European Union in the 2016 referendum, higher than the UK-wide figure of 48%.

== Creation ==
The constituency was created for the 1983 general election following the major reorganisation of local authorities under the Local Government Act 1972, which came into effect on 1 April 1974. It was formed from parts of the seats of Runcorn, Cheadle, Northwich and Knutsford. Rather than being named after any of the principal towns, or 'North Cheshire', the constituency is named after Tatton Park, a stately home near Knutsford, in the centre of the constituency.

== Boundaries ==
=== Historic ===
==== 1983–1997 ====
- The Borough of Macclesfield wards of Dean Row, Fulshaw, Handforth, High Legh, Hough, Knutsford Nether, Knutsford Over, Knutsford South, Knutsford West, Lacey Green, Mere, Mobberley, Morley and Styal, and Plumley; and
- The District of Vale Royal wards of Barnton, Castle, Cogshall, Lostock Gralam, Marston and Wincham, Northwich, Rudheath and Whatcroft, Seven Oaks, Shakerley, Winnington, Witton North, and Witton South.

Initially comprised the towns of Northwich and Knutsford and surrounding rural areas, formerly parts of the abolished constituencies of the same names, together with the former Urban District of Wilmslow, previously part of the constituency of Cheadle. Also included a small area transferred from Runcorn.

==== 1997–2010 ====
- The Borough of Macclesfield wards of Alderley Edge, Dean Row, Fulshaw, Handforth, High Legh, Hough, Knutsford Nether, Knutsford Over, Knutsford South, Knutsford West, Lacey Green, Mere, Mobberley, Morley and Styal, Nether Alderley, and Plumley; and
- The District of Vale Royal wards of Barnton, Cogshall, Lostock Gralam, Marston and Wincham, Rudheath and Whatcroft, Seven Oaks, and Shakerley.

Under the Fourth Periodic Review of constituencies, the number of constituencies in Cheshire was increased from 10 to 11 and Northwich was now included in the newly created constituency of Weaver Vale. To partly compensate for this loss, Alderley Edge was transferred from Macclesfield.

==== 2010–2024 ====
Map of former boundaries, used from 2010–2024

The Parliamentary Constituencies (England) Order 2007 made only marginal changes to Tatton. However, before this came into force for the 2010 election, the districts making up the county of Cheshire were abolished on 1 April 2009, being replaced by four unitary authorities. Consequently, the constituency's boundaries became:

- The Borough of Cheshire East wards of Alderley Edge, Chelford, Handforth, High Legh, Knutsford, Mobberley, Wilmslow Dean Row, Wilmslow East, Wilmslow Lacey Green, and Wilmslow West and Chorley; and
- the Borough of Cheshire West and Chester wards of Marbury, Shakerley, and Witton & Rudheath (part)^{1}.

^{1} Following a further local government ward boundary review which became effective in 2019, the parts in Cheshire West and Chester became the wards of Davenham Moulton & Kingsmead (small part), Marbury (most), Rudheath (most), and Shakerley.

=== Current ===
Further to the 2023 review of Westminster constituencies which became effective for the 2024 general election, the constituency is currently composed of the following (as they existed on 1 December 2020):

- The Borough of Cheshire East wards of: Alderley Edge; Chelford; Handforth; High Legh; Knutsford; Mobberley; Wilmslow Dean Row; Wilmslow East; Wilmslow Lacey Green; Wilmslow West and Chorley.
- The Borough of Cheshire West and Chester wards of: Marbury; Shakerley.
- The Borough of Warrington wards of: Lymm North & Thelwall (polling districts SNA, SNB, SPA, SPB and SPC); Lymm South.

The constituency has been expanded to bring the electorate within the permitted range by transferring the village of Lymm (but not Thelwall) from Warrington South. Other boundary changes within the Borough of Cheshire West and Cheshire took account of ward boundary modifications.

== Political history ==
The constituency was initially held in 1983 by the Conservative Neil Hamilton.

During the 1997 general election campaign, Tatton was one of the UK's highest-profile constituencies. It was also notionally one of the safest Conservative seats in the country, as boundary changes brought in Alderley Edge into the constituency in place of Northwich, making Tatton the fourth safest Conservative seat in the country with a majority of over 22,000 had it existed in 1992.

Following Hamilton's implication in the Cash for Questions scandal of the 1990s, the Labour Party and the Liberal Democrats withdrew their candidates in favour of the former BBC journalist Martin Bell, who stood as an independent, while those two parties supported his "anti-corruption" campaign. Bell was ultimately successful, with a majority of 11,077. Hamilton came second.

Having promised to serve only one term, Bell did not contest the seat at the 2001 election, and the seat was won by Conservative George Osborne with a majority of 8,611 (20.8%). Osborne held the seat at the 2005 election with an increased majority, and became the Shadow Chancellor that year. He held the position of Chancellor of the Exchequer from 2010 to 2016, one of the highest frontbench government positions. Osborne served the seat until standing down at the 2017 election, having been announced as the new editor of the London Evening Standard newspaper in March of that year.

Esther McVey, who had been MP for nearby Wirral West from 2010 until her defeat in 2015, was elected in 2017. McVey was the Secretary of State for Work and Pensions after Theresa May's Cabinet reshuffle in January 2018, but resigned after concerns over May's plan of leaving the European Union in November 2018. McVey subsequently announced her candidacy for the Conservative Party leadership in 2019, but was knocked out in the first round, receiving the lowest number of votes of all ten candidates. She was re-elected in 2024 with a much reduced majority of 1,136, down from 17,387, making this a marginal seat for the first time in history.

== Members of Parliament ==
Election	Member	Party
1983	Neil Hamilton	Conservative
1997	Martin Bell	Independent
2001	George Osborne	Conservative
2017	Esther McVey	Conservative

== Elections ==
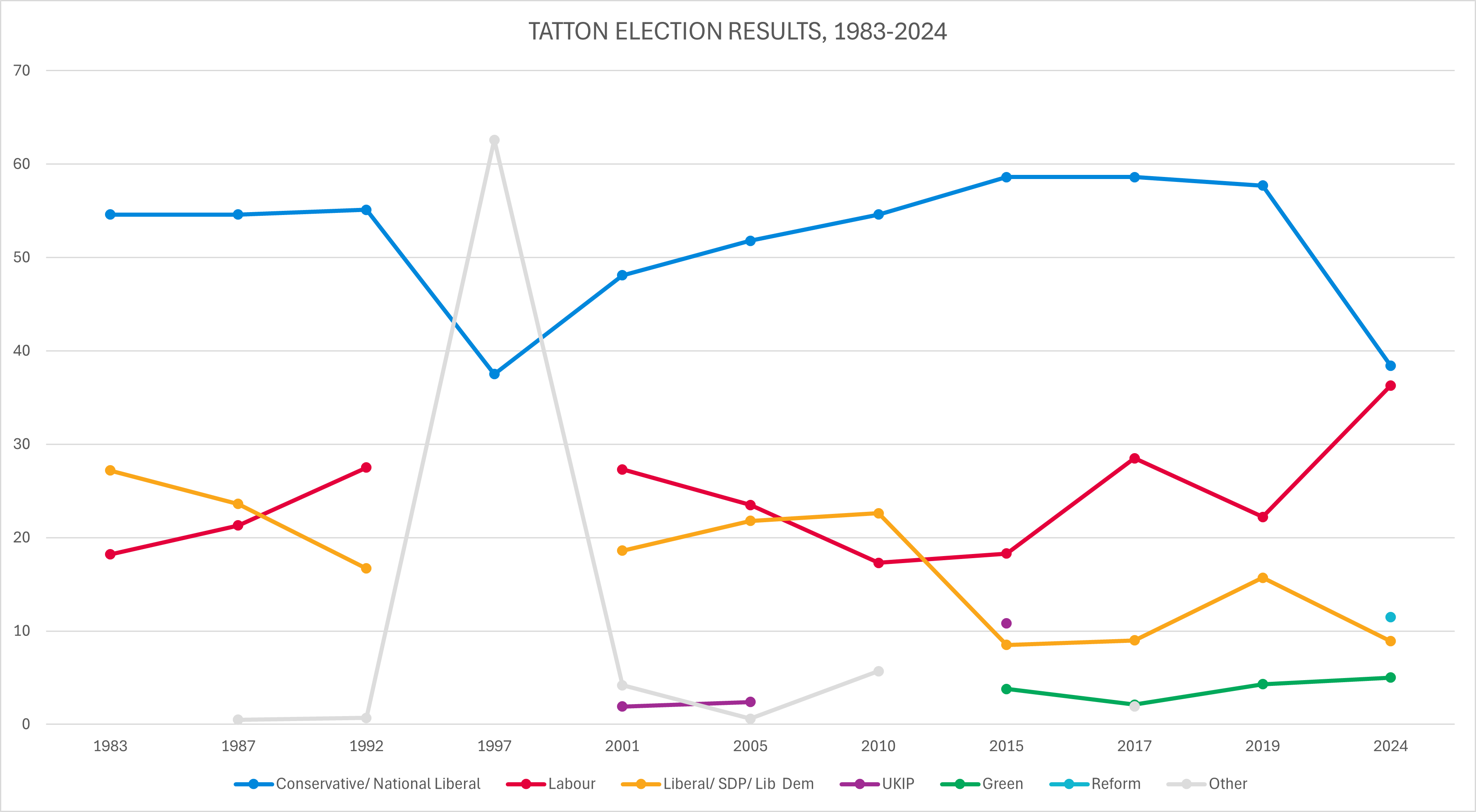
Election results 1983–2024

=== Elections in the 2020s ===
General election 2024: Tatton
Party	Candidate	Votes	%	±%
Conservative	Esther McVey	19,956	38.4	−18.9
Labour	Ryan Jude	18,820	36.3	+13.8
Reform	Oliver Speakman	5,948	11.5	+11.1
Liberal Democrats	Jonathan Smith	4,614	8.9	−7.3
Green	Nigel Hennerley	2,571	5.0	+1.3
Rejected ballots		198		
Majority		1,136	2.1	−32.7
Turnout		51,909	68.3	
Conservative hold		Swing	−16.3	

=== Elections in the 2010s ===
General election 2019: Tatton
Party	Candidate	Votes	%	±%
Conservative	Esther McVey	28,277	57.7	−0.8
Labour	James Weinberg	10,890	22.2	−6.2
Liberal Democrats	Jonathan Smith	7,712	15.7	+6.7
Green	Nigel Hennerley	2,088	4.3	+2.2
Rejected ballots		187		
Majority		17,387	35.5	+5.4
Turnout		49,146	71.2	−1.3
Registered electors		69,018		
Conservative hold		Swing	+2.7	

General election 2017: Tatton
Party	Candidate	Votes	%	±%
Conservative	Esther McVey	28,764	58.6	−0.1
Labour	Sam Rushworth	13,977	28.5	+10.1
Liberal Democrats	Gareth Wilson	4,431	9.0	+0.5
Green	Nigel Hennerley	1,024	2.1	−1.7
Independent	Quentin Abel	920	1.9	N/A
Rejected ballots		104		
Majority		14,787	30.1	−10.2
Turnout		49,220	72.5	+2.5
Registered electors		67,874		
Conservative hold		Swing	−5.1	

General election 2015: Tatton
Party	Candidate	Votes	%	±%
Conservative	George Osborne	26,552	58.6	+4.0
Labour	David Pinto-Duschinsky	8,311	18.3	+1.1
UKIP	Stuart Hutton	4,871	10.8	N/A
Liberal Democrats	Gareth Wilson	3,850	8.5	−14.1
Green	Tina Rothery	1,714	3.8	N/A
Rejected ballots		185		
Majority		18,241	40.3	+8.3
Turnout		45,483	70.0	+2.1
Registered electors		65,004		
Conservative hold		Swing	+1.5	

General election 2010: Tatton
Party	Candidate	Votes	%	±%
Conservative	George Osborne	24,687	54.6	+3.1
Liberal Democrats	David Lomax	10,200	22.6	+0.8
Labour	Richard Jackson	7,803	17.3	−6.5
Independent	Sarah Flannery	2,243	5.0	N/A
The True English (Poetry) Party	Michael Gibson	298	0.7	N/A
Majority		14,487	32.0	
Turnout		45,317	67.9	
Conservative hold		Swing		

=== Elections in the 2000s ===
General election 2005: Tatton
Party	Candidate	Votes	%	±%
Conservative	George Osborne	21,447	51.8	+3.7
Labour	Justin Madders	9,716	23.5	−3.8
Liberal Democrats	William Arnold	9,016	21.8	+3.2
UKIP	Diane Bowler	996	2.4	+0.5
Independent	Michael Gibson	239	0.6	N/A
Majority		11,731	28.3	+3.5
Turnout		41,414	64.6	+1.1
Conservative hold		Swing	+3.8	

General election 2001: Tatton
Party	Candidate	Votes	%	±%
Conservative	George Osborne	19,860	48.1	+10.6
Labour	Steven Conquest	11,249	27.3	N/A
Liberal Democrats	Michael Ash	7,685	18.6	N/A
UKIP	Mark Sheppard	769	1.9	N/A
Independent Green	Peter Sharratt	734	1.8	N/A
Tatton Group	Vivianne Allinson	505	1.2	N/A
Independent	John Batchelor	322	0.8	N/A
Independent	Jonathan Hunt	154	0.4	N/A
Majority		8,611	20.8	N/A
Turnout		41,278	63.5	−7.6
Conservative gain from Independent		Swing	+5.4	

=== Elections in the 1990s ===
General election 1997: Tatton
Party	Candidate	Votes	%	±%
Independent	Martin Bell	29,354	60.2	
Conservative	Neil Hamilton	18,277	37.5	
Ind. Conservative	Sam Hill	295	0.6	
Ind. Conservative	Simon Kinsey	187	0.4	
Miss Moneypenny's Glamorous One Party	Burnel Penhaul	128	0.3	
Albion Party	John Muir	126	0.3	
Natural Law	Michael Kennedy	123	0.3	
Lord Biro versus the Scallywag Tories	David Bishop	116	0.2	
Ind. Conservative	Ralph Nicholas	113	0.2	
Juice Party	Julian Price	73	0.1	
Majority		11,077	22.7	
Turnout		48,792	76.1	
Independent gain from Conservative		Swing		

1992 notional result
Party	Vote	%
Conservative	32,235	62.18
Labour	9,870	19.04
Liberal Democrats	9,387	18.11
Others	350	0.68
Majority	22,365	43.1
Turnout	51,842	81.4

General election 1992: Tatton
Party	Candidate	Votes	%	±%
Conservative	Neil Hamilton	31,658	55.1	+0.5
Labour	Jonathan Kelly	15,798	27.5	+5.9
Liberal Democrats	Catherine Hancox	9,597	16.7	−6.9
Feudal Party	Michael Gibson	410	0.7	+0.2
Majority		15,860	27.6	−3.4
Turnout		57,463	80.8	+4.0
Conservative hold		Swing	−2.7	

=== Elections in the 1980s ===
General election 1987: Tatton
Party	Candidate	Votes	%	±%
Conservative	Neil Hamilton	30,128	54.6	±0.0
SDP	Bridie Gaskin	13,034	23.6	−3.6
Labour	Hazel Blears	11,760	21.3	+3.1
Feudal Party	Michael Gibson	263	0.5	N/A
Majority		17,094	31.0	+3.6
Turnout		55,185	76.8	+2.5
Conservative hold		Swing	+1.8	

General election 1983: Tatton
Party	Candidate	Votes	%	±%
Conservative	Neil Hamilton	27,877	54.6	
SDP	David Levy	13,917	27.2	
Labour	William Davies	9,295	18.2	
Majority		13,960	27.4	
Turnout		51,089	74.3	
Conservative win (new seat)				

== See also ==
- Parliamentary constituencies in Cheshire
- History of parliamentary constituencies and boundaries in Cheshire

== Sources ==
- Data for the 2005 election are from the BBC.
- Data for the 2001 election are from United Kingdom Election Results.
- Data for the 1997 and 1992 results are taken from The Guardian.
- Data for 1983 and 1987 elections taken from Politicsresources.net – Official Web Site ✔

Parliament of the United Kingdom
Preceded by Edinburgh South West	Constituency represented by the chancellor of the Exchequer; 2010–2016	Succeeded by Runnymede and Weybridge
