= Martin Bell =

British reporter and politician (born 1938)

Martin Bell OBE
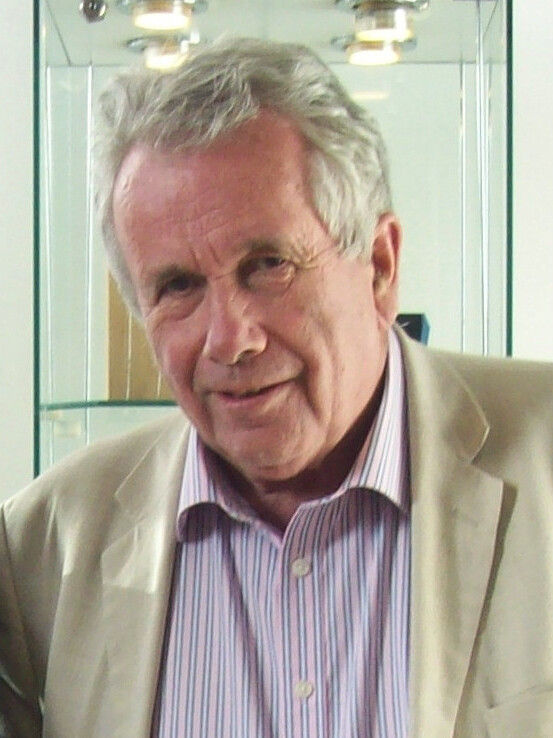
- Bell at Hexham book festival in 2009

Member of Parliament for Tatton
- In office 1 May 1997 – 14 May 2001
- Preceded by: Neil Hamilton
- Succeeded by: George Osborne

Personal details
- Born: 31 August 1938 (age 88) Redisham, Suffolk, England
- Party: Independent
- Spouses: Helene Gordoun (m. 1971; div. 1981) Rebecca Sobel (m. 1984; div. 1991) Fiona Goddard (m. 1998, divorced) Merita Zhubi (m. 2020)
- Children: 2
- Parent: Adrian Bell (father)
- Relatives: Anthea Bell (sister); Oliver Kamm (nephew)
- Education: King's College, Cambridge
- Occupation: War reporter

Martin Bell (born 31 August 1938) is a British UNICEF Ambassador, former broadcaster, war reporter and independent politician who was the Member of Parliament (MP) for Tatton from 1997 to 2001. He is known as "the man in the white suit".

As a BBC reporter, he pioneered an approach to journalism he later described as a "moral enterprise" informed by the individual journalist's personal sense of "right and wrong", and which, as he put it, "cares as well as knows; that is aware of its responsibilities; and will not stand neutrally between good and evil, right and wrong, the victim and the oppressor."

== Background ==
Bell is the son of author-farmer Adrian Bell, compiler of the first ever Times crossword. He is the brother of literary translator Anthea Bell (who died in 2018) and the uncle of Oliver Kamm, now a Times leader writer who served as his political adviser during his term as a Member of Parliament (MP).

He was privately educated at the Taverham Hall School just outside Norwich in Norfolk, and then The Leys School in Cambridge. At King's College, Cambridge, he achieved a first-class honours degree in English and served on the committee of Cambridge University Liberal Club, including a term as publicity officer. He failed to obtain a commission during his two-year national service and served out his time as an acting corporal in the Suffolk Regiment, serving in Cyprus during the Emergency.

== BBC correspondent ==
Martin Bell joined the BBC as a reporter in Norwich in 1962. He moved to London three years later, beginning a distinguished career as a foreign affairs correspondent with his first assignment in Ghana. Over the next thirty years, he covered eleven conflicts and reported from eighty countries, making his name with reports from wars and conflicts in Vietnam, the Middle East, Nigeria, Angola, and in Northern Ireland (during "The Troubles").

His roles at the BBC included diplomatic correspondent (1977–78), chief Washington correspondent (1978–89), and Berlin correspondent (1989–94).

He won the Royal Television Society's Reporter of the Year award in 1977 and 1993 and was appointed an Officer of the Order of the British Empire (OBE) in 1992. That same year, while covering the war in Bosnia, Bell was seriously wounded by shrapnel while recording a report in Sarajevo.

He remained an official BBC correspondent, although from the mid-1990s he filed relatively few reports, and became disillusioned with the corporation. He was unimpressed by the BBC's introduction of a 24-hour news channel (BBC News 24) and what he described as the increasing "Murdochisation" of BBC News.

== Independent politician ==
On 7 April 1997, twenty-four days before that year's British general election, Bell announced that he was leaving the BBC to stand as an independent candidate in the Tatton constituency in Cheshire. Tatton was one of the safest Conservative seats in the country, where the sitting Conservative Member of Parliament, Neil Hamilton, was embroiled in sleaze allegations. Labour and the Liberal Democrats withdrew their candidates in Bell's favour in a plan masterminded by Alastair Campbell, Tony Blair's press secretary. On 1 May 1997, Hamilton was trounced, and Bell was elected an MP with a majority of 11,077 votes – overturning a notional Conservative majority of over 22,000 in the 4th safest Conservative seat in the UK – and thus became the first successful independent parliamentary candidate since 1951.

When Bell spoke in the House of Commons, it was mostly on local issues or matters of British policy in the former Yugoslavia and the Third World. Although Bell voted with the Labour government of Tony Blair on many issues, he voted with the Conservatives in opposing the repeal of Section 28. He also voted against the banning of fox hunting. On 12 November 1997 he was cheered from the Conservative benches when he asked Blair about the Bernie Ecclestone affair, "Does the Prime Minister agree that the perception of wrongdoing can be as damaging to public confidence as the wrongdoing itself? Have we slain one dragon only to have another take its place, with a red rose in its mouth?"

Bell described being an independent politician in Parliament as a "fortunate position" given that he was not obliged to support positions he did not believe in (while acknowledging that such compromises were "necessary evils" of party politics).

As part of his election platform, Bell had stated that he would serve for only one term, his specific purpose being to oppose Neil Hamilton. Bell said that the only thing which could make him change his mind would be Hamilton being selected by the Tatton Conservative Party as a candidate for the next general election. However, George Osborne (a future Chancellor of the Exchequer) was selected in March 1999 as the Conservative Party candidate for Tatton. Hamilton lost his libel case against Mohamed Al-Fayed in December 1999, ending any prospect of his making an immediate political comeback. Though he regretted making the pledge of saying he would serve for only one term, Bell stuck to his promise.

In 1998 he published a manifesto in the International Journal of Press/Politics in which he described his personal philosophy as a journalist as follows: "In place of the dispassionate practices of the past I now believe in what I call the journalism of attachment. By this I mean a journalism that cares as well as knows; that is aware of its responsibilities; and will not stand neutrally between good and evil, right and wrong, the victim and the oppressor."

In 2001, Bell stood as an independent candidate against another Conservative MP, Eric Pickles, in the "safe" Essex constituency of Brentwood and Ongar, where there were accusations that the local Conservative Association had been infiltrated by a Pentecostal church. In this election, Labour and the Liberal Democrats did not stand aside for him. Bell came second and reduced the Conservative majority from 9,690 to 2,821. Having garnered nearly 32% of the votes and second place, Bell announced his retirement from politics, saying that "winning one and losing one is not a bad record for an amateur".

The Channel 4 drama Mr White Goes to Westminster was loosely based on Bell's political career.

== Post-political life ==
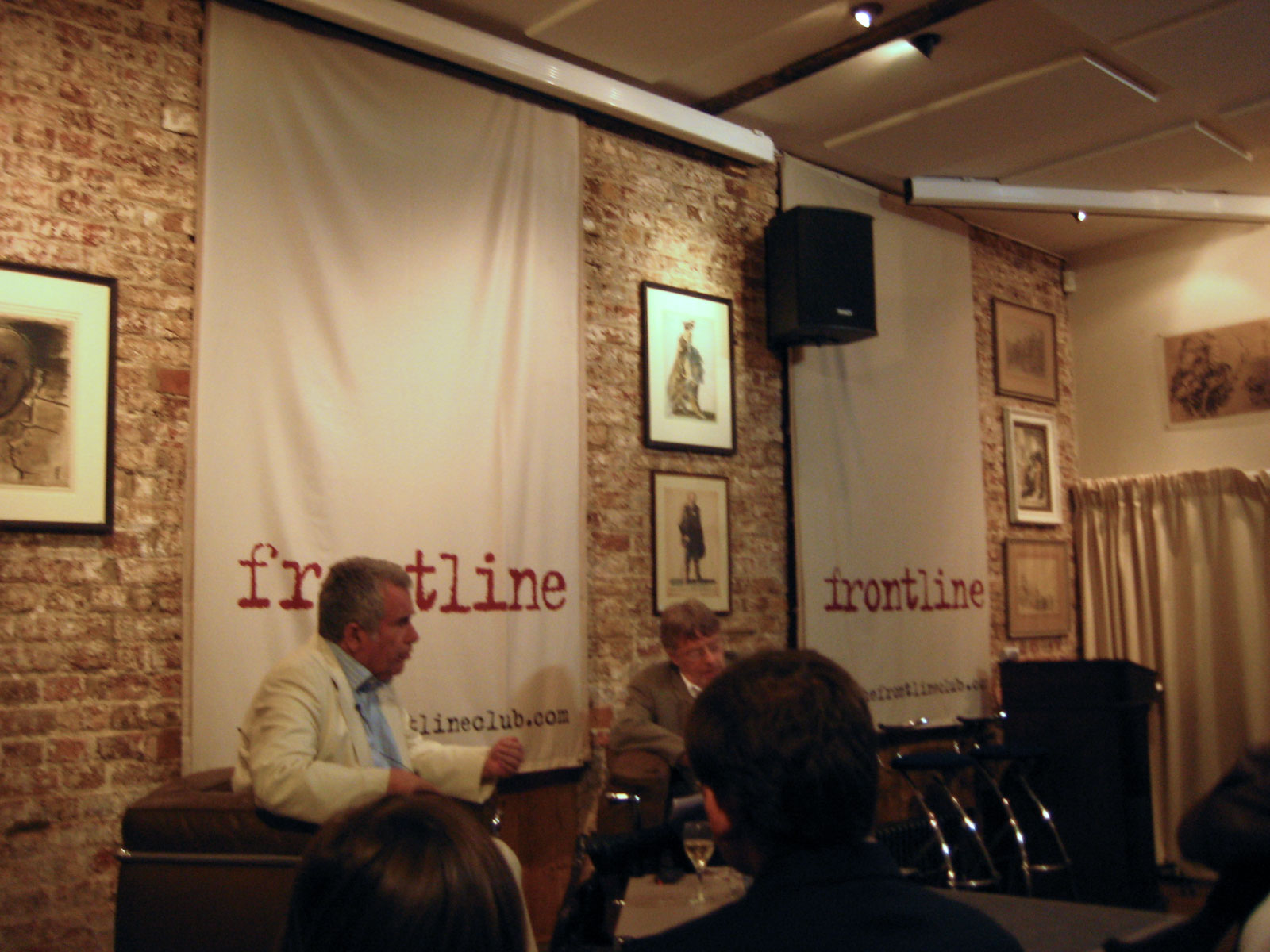
Bell addresses a Frontline Club forum in 2007.

Bell was appointed UNICEF UK Ambassador for Humanitarian Emergencies in August 2001, to work to improve the plight of children affected by conflict and natural disasters.

He made a brief return to television news in 2003 when he provided analysis of the Iraq invasion for ITN's Channel Five News. He compiled films from the daily video footage and drew on his experience to comment upon this material.

Bell reversed his previous decision and stood for the European Parliament in the June 2004 elections, but was ultimately unsuccessful as an independent candidate in the East of England region, winning only 6.2% of the vote.

Before the 2005 general election he became affiliated with the Independent Network to help promote independent candidates (its most prominent candidate being Reg Keys who fought against prime minister Tony Blair in the Sedgefield constituency).

In April 2006, Scottish National Party MP Angus MacNeil asked the Metropolitan Police to investigate whether any law had been broken in the Cash for Peerages scandal. Bell wrote jointly with MacNeil to Prime Minister Tony Blair calling for all appointments to the House of Lords to be suspended.

In May 2009, he came out in support of the Green Party in the weeks before the 2009 European Parliament election, supporting the Green Party's 'Clean Campaigning' pledge in the wake of the scandal over MPs' expenses.

On 21 May 2009, he appeared on the special live edition of BBC's Question Time which was held in Salisbury in the midst of the political scandal surrounding MPs' expenses.

He announced that he was considering standing against a third Conservative MP, Sir Nicholas Winterton, the MP for Macclesfield, at the 2010 general election, but following Winterton's announcement that he was not going to seek re-election, did not do so. He indicated that he might stand against Hazel Blears in Salford (the first sitting MP of a party other than the Conservative Party against whom he expressed an interest in standing) although in the end he did not stand in any constituency.

In November 2018, Bell fell at Gatwick Airport and required major maxillo-facial surgery at St George's Hospital to rebuild his face. He praised surgeon Helen Witherow, saying "this lady is an absolutely brilliant surgeon, and I think sometimes the NHS can use a bit of good publicity".

In November 2021, Bell was approached by the Liberal Democrats to run in the 2021 North Shropshire by-election after the resignation of the Tory MP Owen Paterson after a lobbying scandal, but declined to stand.

== Personal life ==
Bell has been married four times. He has two daughters with his first wife, Helene Gordoun, a Frenchwoman whom he left for the American television journalist Rebecca Sobel during his time in Washington. He commented that the marriage was "a disaster", and it later emerged that his stepdaughter, Jessica Sobel, had become a drug addict, prostitute and porn star.

Bell's elder daughter Melissa followed in his footsteps as a journalist and as of 2026 is a CNN correspondent in Paris.

== Publications ==
- In Harm's Way: Bosnia – a war reporter's story (London, 1995, revised edition 1996) ISBN 0-14-025108-1
- An Accidental MP (Viking, London, 2000, Penguin paperback 2001) ISBN 0-670-89231-9
- Through Gates of Fire: a Journey into World Disorder (London, 2003, Phoenix paperback 2004) ISBN 0-7538-1786-1
- The Truth That Sticks: New Labour's Breach of Trust (Icon Books, London, 2007) ISBN 1-84046-822-X
- A Very British Revolution: The Expenses Scandal and How to Save Our Democracy (Icon Books, London, 2009) ISBN 978-1-84831-096-4
- For Whom the Bell Tolls: Light and Dark Verse (Icon Books, London, 2011) ISBN 978-184831-691-1
- The End of Empire: the Cyprus emergency – a soldier's story (Pen & Sword, Barnsley, 2011) ISBN 978-1-47384-818-4
- War and the Death of News: Reflections of a Grade B Reporter (Oneworld, London, 2017) ISBN 978-1-78607-108-8
- War and Peacekeeping: Personal Reflections on Conflict and Lasting Peace(Oneworld, London, 2020) ISBN 978-1-78607-763-9

== See also ==
- Vukovar massacre
- Imperial War Museum Duxford § Royal Anglian Regiment Museum and Memorial

Parliament of the United Kingdom
Preceded by Neil Hamilton	Member of Parliament for Tatton; 1997–2001	Succeeded by George Osborne
