= Tiger Moon =

2006 German fantasy novel by Antonia Michaelis

Tiger Moon is a 2006 German fantasy novel written by Antonia Michaelis. It has been translated to English by Anthea Bell in 2008. It is published by Amulet Books.

== Summary ==
Sold to be the eighth wife of a rich and cruel merchant, Safia, also called Raka, tries to escape her fate by telling stories of Farhad the thief, his companion Nitish, the white tiger, and their travels across India to retrieve a famous jewel called the "bloodstone" that will save a kidnapped princess from becoming the bride of a demon king, Ravana.
