= Adrian Bell =

English ruralist journalist and farmer (1901–1980)

Adrian Bell

Adrian Hanbury Bell (4 October 1901 – 5 September 1980) was an English ruralist journalist and farmer, and the first compiler of The Times crossword.

== Early life ==
Bell was born at Stretford, Lancashire, son of Robert Bell (1865-1949), editor of The Observer, and artist Emily Jane Frances (1873-1954), second of three daughters of architect and surveyor Charles de Witt Hanbury, of Leeds, later of Manchester, who was a descendant of the Royalist politician John Hanbury and related to the nonconformist historian Benjamin Hanbury. The Bell family later moved to London. Adrian Bell was educated at Uppingham School in Rutland.

== Career ==
At the age of 19 he ventured into the countryside in Hundon, Suffolk, to learn about agriculture, and he farmed in various locations over the next sixty years, until his death in September 1980. His work on farms included the rebuilding of a near-derelict 89-acre (36 ha) smallholding at Redisham, near Beccles.

Out of his early experiences of farming at Bradfield St. George, in Suffolk, came the book Corduroy, published in 1930. Bell's friend, the author and poet Edmund Blunden, advised him and helped secure his first publishing deal. Corduroy was an immediate best-seller and was followed by two more books on the countryside, Silver Ley in 1931 and The Cherry Tree in 1932, the three books forming a ruralist farm trilogy. The popularity of literary back-to-the-land writing in England in the 1930s can be put in the context of, for example, Vita Sackville-West's long narrative poem The Land. The Penguin Books paperback edition of Corduroy came out in 1940 and was much prized by soldiers serving during the Second World War.

Bell wrote the "Countryman’s Notebook" column in the Eastern Daily Press from 1950, and produced over twenty other books on the countryside, including Men and the Fields (1939), Apple Acre (1942), Sunrise to Sunset (1944), The Budding Morrow (1946), The Flower and the Wheel (1949), Music in the Morning, (1954), A Suffolk Harvest (1956), the autobiographical My Own Master (1961) and The Green Bond (1976). Bell was friendly with many literary and cultural figures, including Edmund Blunden, F.R. Leavis, H.J. Massingham, Alfred Munnings, John Nash and Henry Williamson.

When The Times began to lose circulation to The Daily Telegraph because the latter was running a daily crossword, Bell's father suggested him to the editor as the first "setter" even though he had never even solved one. Bell had just 10 days' notice before his first puzzle was published, in the weekly edition on 2 January 1930. Having set around 5,000 puzzles between 1930 and 1978, Bell is credited with helping to establish its distinctive cryptic clue style.

Ann Lynda Gander wrote the first biography of Bell in 2001. The first full-length critical appreciation of his work, At the Field's Edge by Richard Hawking, was published in April 2019.

== Family ==
Bell married Marjorie Gibson, an admirer of his work, in 1931; they had a son and two daughters. Son Martin Bell is a former BBC war reporter, and was an independent Member of Parliament between 1997 and 2001. Things That Endure, a half-hour BBC radio documentary on Adrian Bell presented by his son, was broadcast on 2 September 2005 on Radio 4. Daughter Anthea Bell, who died in 2018, was a translator known for her English versions of Franz Kafka, Sigmund Freud, W. G. Sebald and the Asterix comic books.
