= Antony Kamm =

British publisher, author, historian and cricketer (1931–2011)

Antony Kamm (2 March 1931 – 11 February 2011) was an English publisher, author, historian and cricketer.

== Biography ==
Antony Kamm was born in Hampstead, London, the son of George Kamm, a founder director of Pan Books and his wife Josephine, a biographer and novelist (who was a first cousin of Herbert Samuel). Kamm was of Jewish ancestry.

He was educated at Charterhouse where he captained the 1st XI before his National Service in the Navy. He read Classics for two years before switching to English Literature at Worcester College, Oxford University. He also played hockey and fives for the university. He was a right-handed batsman and wicket keeper who represented Middlesex in two first-class matches in 1952, six for Oxford University (1952–1955; blue 1954) and once for Free Foresters in 1956.

Kamm led a successful career in publishing. His first job was for the National Book League, a charity advocating the benefits of reading, working under Jack Morpurgo, the step-father of the children's writer Michael Morpurgo. He became the editorial director of the Leicester-based publisher, Brockhampton Press, in 1960. In this role, he acquired the rights to the Asterix comic books, launching English editions of them which began in 1968, co-translated by his then wife, Anthea Bell, and Derek Hockridge. He became chairman of the Children's Book Group at the Publishers’ Association, and was a consultant to UNESCO.

During the 1970s, Kamm worked for the Commonwealth Secretariat in London and began to work for Oxford University Press in charge of its children's books division. Kamm wrote several books, especially on Roman history and children's literature. His biography of Scottish engineer John Logie Baird, co-written with Malcolm Baird, was published in 2002. In addition to his writing, he was also a lecturer in publishing at Stirling University (1988–1995).

He married Anthea Bell (1936–2018) in 1957; the couple had two sons, Richard and Oliver (the latter, a journalist at The Times), but subsequently divorced in 1973. His second marriage was to the biographer and children's author Eileen Dunlop (born 1938). Kamm died in Dollar, Clackmannanshire, Scotland.

== Bibliography ==
- Collins Biographical Dictionary of English Literature (1993)
- The Romans: An Introduction (1995)
- The Israelites: An Introduction (1999)
- John Logie Baird: A Life (Malcolm Baird, 2002)
- The Last Frontier (2004)
- Julius Caesar: A Life (2006)
- Scottish Collection of Verse to 1800 (with Eileen Dunlop)
- Scottish Printed Books, 1508–2008 (2008)
