= No Turning Back (political group) =

Group within the British Conservative Party

No Turning Back is a group within the British Conservative Party advocating Thatcherite policies. It was founded in 1985 to defend Margaret Thatcher's free-market reforms. The group was named in honour of Thatcher's 1980 Conservative conference quote "U-turn if you want to. The lady's not for turning." No Turning Back published less material in the nineties and became involved in Conservative party in-fighting, resulting in both Michael Portillo and Francis Maude leaving the group, but became more prominent during Iain Duncan Smith's time as Conservative leader because he had been a member until he was elected.

Since 2005 the No Turning Back group has been chaired by John Redwood. It reportedly has "about 100 members" with "quite a lot" from the 2010 intake. It has published pamphlets on the subjects of taxation and social mobility in the past, although the group exists mainly as a private dining club, meeting monthly, usually inviting a Minister or external expert to speak. There are currently no plans to launch future pamphlets.

The group has been seen as "deeply antagonistic" towards David Cameron, specifically early on in his leadership.

== Plots ==
The No Turning Back Group allegedly discussed their 'grumbles' at David Cameron over a bowl of soup at the so-called Dinner Party Plot (2013). John Redwood refutes these claims.

== Brightly Coloured Ties ==
Due to the group, brightly coloured ties have become a symbol of political purity on the right of the conservative party. Following the Death of Eric Forth in 2006, his widow donated a stock of his sizable brightly coloured tie selection to the group. The annual "Eric Forth Memorial Award" was subsequently established, 'for the MP who had done most to carry on Eric's work'. The first winner of this award was Philip Davies who said "winning the award was one of the most special moments of my life in parliament".

== Similar Groups ==
The group shares many aims and members with the 92 Group (which is chaired by Christopher Chope, who is also a member of No Turning Back) and the Cornerstone Group (chaired by Sir Edward Leigh, also a member of No Turning Back).

== Members ==
Past and current members include-

- Nicholas Bennett
- David Davis
- Alan Duncan
- Michael Fallon
- Eric Forth
- Liam Fox
- Paul Goodman
- Neil Hamilton
- Greg Hands
- Alan Howarth
- Gerald Howarth
- Bernard Jenkin
- Barry Legg
- Greg Knight
- Edward Leigh
- Peter Lilley
- Francis Maude
- Michael Portillo
- John Redwood
- Iain Duncan Smith
- Andrew Turner
- Angela Watkinson
- John Whittingdale

== Publications ==
The group's publications include-

- "Healthy Choices" 2002
- "The Case for Lower Taxes" 2006
