= Eldon League =

British right-wing reactionary organisation

The Eldon League was a parodic British right-wing reactionary society, which aimed to promote feudalism and monarchism. It was set up by Grand Imperial Prior Neil Hamilton, then an undergraduate at Cambridge University, as an eating and drinking society.

== Views and aims ==
Historian David Lowenthal likens the group to the Society for Creative Anachronism, a living history group in the United States, in their (possibly ironic) appreciation of a past which is now considered obsolete. Grand Imperial Prior of the group Neil Hamilton has said the group wished to "abolish the twentieth century", arguing that "the 18th century was the summit of civilisation". It was anti-feminist, anti-democratic, pro-feudalism, anti-trade, and in favour of the Gold Standard, good government, the monarchy and aristocracy. The group believed in a projection of the Earth as flat and back-to-front. The group had two main political factions: "Forward into the past" (the progressive wing) and "backwards into the future" (the regressive wing).

It is named after the early 19th century head of Britain's judiciary, Lord Eldon, whom Hamilton called "the greatest reactionary of all time" with an "unremitting opposition to democracy and abolition of the House of Commons". Hamilton also noted: "he opposed reform of the penal code and all other changes in 26 years as Lord High Chancellor, except trial by battle, which he abolished in 1819. The League is not in favour of any change, but then nobody's perfect."

In 1980, it was described by Private Eye as the Conservative Party's equivalent of the far-right John Birch Society in the US. The group was represented in Hong Kong, West Germany, South Africa and the United States. The group had diplomatic links with the Republic of Minerva micronation, contacts with French and Italian monarchist groups, and ties to émigré groups behind the Iron Curtain.

== Activities ==
The society was known for its eccentricity; for example, League members walked or travelled by horse-drawn carriage wherever possible and engaged in 'annual hijinks' at Ascot Racecourse and the Henley Royal Regatta.

The group was well known for their annual champagne duels, involving well-shaken bottles of champagne aimed at each other from 10 yards apart. The winner of the duel is whoever first knocks off their opponent's top hat. Each dueller represents a differing view on a subject, and the winner's viewpoint would later be adopted as League policy. One such duel on 4 June 1975 between Hamilton and another League member decided the group's position on European Community membership in the referendum of that year. Hamilton won the duel, announcing to journalists that the League "views with unabashed antipathy all forms of democracy, especially the referendum" and that "we oppose anything that is common, whether it be consultation of the common people or the Common Market".

The group used to annually commemorate the visit of the last Russian Tsar Nicholas II to Oxford railway station, whereupon he breakfasted at the station after arriving from the 8:45 train from Balmoral, by drinking the Tsar's preferred breakfast champagne (Louis Roederer) and food (pears in white wine). In 1978, Count Nikolai Tolstoy was the guest of honour, to respond to the Russian Tsarist toast "Autocracy, Orthodoxy and Nationalism", also a motto of the League.

On the Fourth of July 1976, the League sent a letter to the United States Ambassador in London inviting the U.S. to rejoin the British Empire, before "ceremonially [retaking] the embassy for the Empire", according to Hamilton.

Every September the group joined the Charles James Fox Society in laying a wreath on Fox's statue in Bloomsbury Square, London, an 18th-century Radical who gambled away $70 million before he was 21.

== Legacy ==
In 1998, following the cash-for-questions affair, Hamilton expressed an interest in promoting the objectives of the League online.

== See also ==
- Traditional Britain Group
- Western Goals Institute
- Monday Club
