= Benjamin Hanbury =

English nonconformist historian (1778–1864)

Benjamin Hanbury (13 May 1778 – 12 January 1864) was an English nonconformist historian.

== Life ==
Hanbury was born in Wolverhampton on 13 May 1778. Most of his education was received from his uncle, the Rev. Dr. John Humphrys, pastor of Union Street congregation, Southwark, who later became principal of Mill Hill School. For a time he was engaged in a retail business; then in June 1803, through the influence of Ebenezer Maitland, he obtained a post in the Bank of England, and remained there till 1859.

Hanbury became one of the deacons at Union Street on 2 May 1819, and held office till 1857, when he moved to Clapham, and then to Brixton. For more than 30 years he was one of the 'Dissenting Deputies", who protected the political rights of nonconformist bodies; and he entered the debate on church establishments which followed the repeal of the Test Act and Corporation Act in 1828. He was a member of Society for Promoting Ecclesiastical Knowledge, instituted for the publication of works bearing on nonconformist theories.

On the formation (1831) of the Congregational Union of England and Wales, Hanbury became its treasurer, and held the post for the rest of his life. He died on 12 January 1864 at his residence, 16 Gloucester Villas, Brixton, and was buried on 19 January in Norwood cemetery.

== Works ==
Hanbury published:

- ‘Extracts from the Diary … of Mr. Joseph Williams,’ 1815. He was a great-grandson of Joseph Williams of Kidderminster was his great-grandfather. The diary was much commended by Hannah More.
- ‘An Historical Research concerning the most ancient Congregational Church in England … Union Street, Southwark,’ 1820.
- ‘Historical Memorials relating to the Independents … from their Rise to the Restoration,’ 1839–44, 3 vols. Includes documents illustrating the rise of nonconformity.

He edited Richard Hooker's Ecclesiastical Polity (1830, 3 vols), including notes and Isaak Walton's Life. For the "Library of Ecclesiastical Knowledge", he wrote a short life (1831) of John Calvin.

== Family ==
He was the son of Rebecca Humphries and John Hanbury, of a family of stuff weavers long settled in Kidderminster, Worcestershire. On 18 September 1801 Hanbury married his relative, Phœbe Lea (d. 1824) of Kidderminster, by whom he had a son (d. 1836) and a daughter, who survived him.

== Notes ==
Attribution

This article incorporates text from a publication now in the public domain: Stephen, Leslie; Lee, Sidney, eds. (1890). "Hanbury, Benjamin". Dictionary of National Biography. Vol. 24. London: Smith, Elder & Co.
