= Miss Moneypenny's =

Club in Birmingham, England

Miss Moneypenny's is a house music party club, founded in Birmingham, England, in 1986 and is hosted at a purpose-built venue in the Hockley area of the city.

Miss Moneypenny's, which styles itself as "The World's Most Glamorous Clubbing Brand", has been hosting parties and events since the 1990s. The club has been featured on BBC Radio 1, in various DJ magazines, and has been voted a top UK dance nightclub since the early 1990s.

== History ==
Miss Moneypenny's evolved as a weekly club event out of the elaborate, one-off ‘Chuff Chuff’ rave parties, a long-running house music event. Chuff Chuff was founded by Mick, Jim, and Dermot Ryan, and Lee Garrick and was initially held as a fancy-dress boat party.

Miss Moneypenny's was started in the summer of 1993 as a weekly Saturday-night event in Bonds nightclub in Birmingham and with resident DJ's Russell Salsbury and Simon Owen. The "Miss Moneypennys" name was chosen because of its association with the James Bond theme suggested by the name of the venue where the night was hosted.

Miss Moneypenny's began to hold other weekly residencies, at The Canal in Wolverhampton, The Church and Liberty's in Birmingham, SKOOL in London, and specialised nights such as MP'S, which was held at the Academy, Stoke-on-Trent, and a special student night, named Jelly Baby.

== Development outside the UK ==
Miss Moneypenny's residencies, Chuff Chuff nights, tours and radio broadcasts use the slogan "The Worlds Most Glamorous Clubbing Brand".

Miss Moneypenny’s has had residencies at venues in a number of European beach-holiday areas including a fourteen-year residency at the BCM superclub in Magaluf, Mallorca, as well as summer residencies in Tenerife, Marbella, Cyprus, Malta, Greece and Turkey. The club also had a 14-year residency at the former El Divino nightclub in Ibiza before it closed in 2009.

== Compilation albums ==
Miss Moneypenny's has released a series of compilation albums, as well as commercial and underground dance tracks on its own in-house music record label, Miss Moneypenny’s Music.

== Radio ==
Miss Moneypenny’s has a syndicated dance music show, presented by Miss Moneypenny's Musical Director, and longtime resident DJ, Jim ‘Shaft’ Ryan.
