= List of leader writers =

A leader writer is a senior journalist in a British newspaper who is charged with writing the paper's editorial. Outside the UK, leader writers are known as editorial writers.
