= 2010 UK Independence Party leadership election =

United Kingdom independence party (UKIP) leadership election

- 5 November 2010
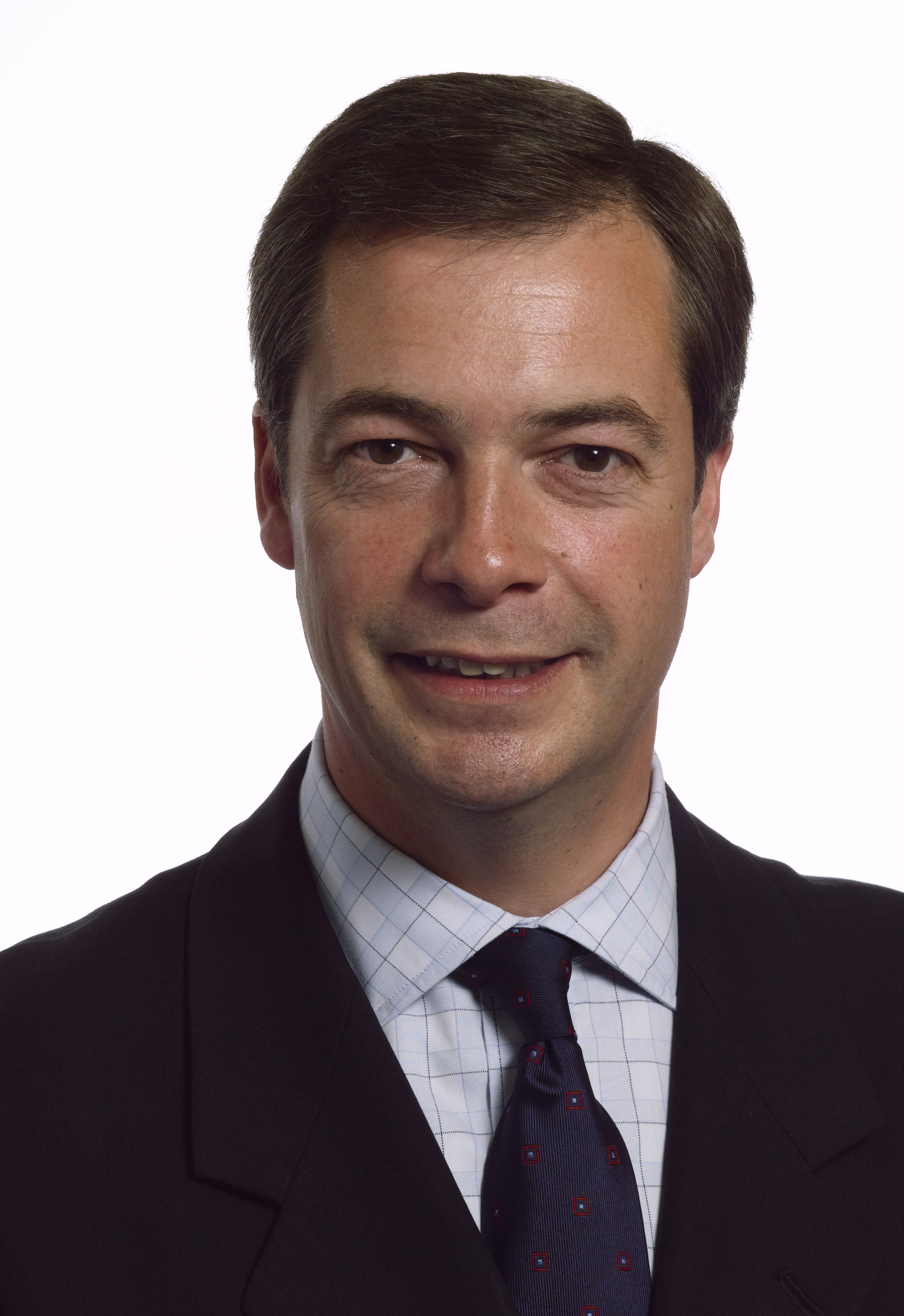

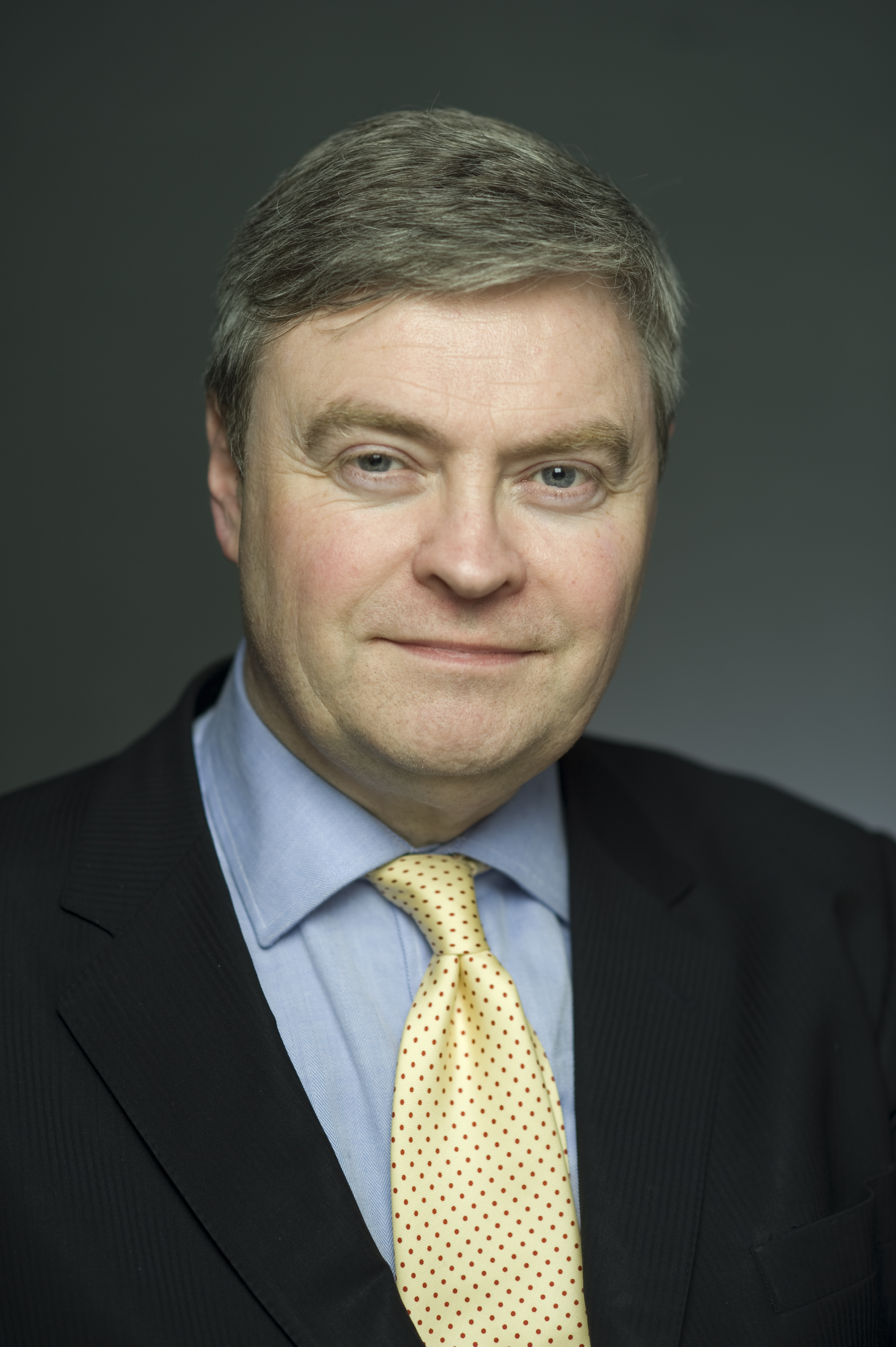

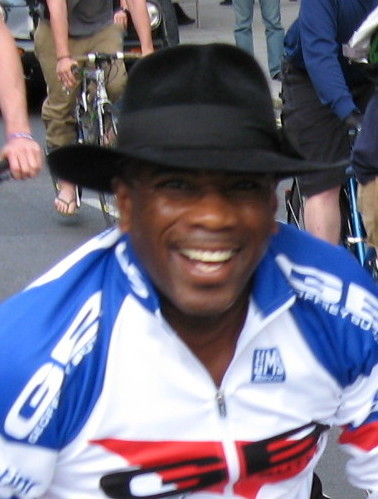
Candidate	Nigel Farage	Tim Congdon
Popular vote	6,085	2,037
Percentage	60.5%	20.2%
Candidate	David Campbell Bannerman	Winston McKenzie
Popular vote	1,404	530
Percentage	14.0%	5.3%
Leader before election
Jeffrey Titford (acting);
Previously Lord Pearson
Elected Leader
Nigel Farage

The UK Independence Party (UKIP) leadership election of 2010 was triggered on 17 August 2010 with the resignation of the incumbent leader, Lord Pearson of Rannoch, following difficulties during the 2010 general election campaign, with the result announced on 5 November 2010. Lord Pearson of Rannoch had been leader of the party since the previous leadership election, less than a year earlier. Jeffrey Titford was appointed interim leader during the summer by the UKIP National Executive Committee. Nigel Farage won the election with over 60% of the vote.

== Background ==
Pearson, formerly a Conservative peer, joined UKIP in 2007. He defeated four candidates to become the leader of the party in 2009.

UKIP failed to win any seats at the 2010 election and fell short of its target of 1 million votes. Farage, the former leader, was the party's best performing candidate by vote share. Pearson announced he would be standing down in 2010, stating he was "not much good" at party politics.

== Candidates ==
All candidates required support from 51 members of UKIP in order to appear on the ballot. The following candidates were confirmed as standing in the election:

- David Campbell Bannerman, UKIP MEP for the East of England
- Tim Congdon, economist
- Nigel Farage, MEP for South East England and former leader
- Winston McKenzie, former boxer; former Conservative member (2006–2008).

MEP Nikki Sinclaire originally announced she had hoped to stand for the leadership, as did MEP Godfrey Bloom who stated he would stand if Nigel Farage decided not to do so. Gerard Batten initially intended to stand, but withdrew and gave his support to Congdon. Lord Monckton also was considering standing but decided not to run.

== Results ==
Nigel Farage won with 60.5% of the vote.

UK Independence Party Leadership election, 2010
Candidate	Votes		%
✓ Nigel Farage	6,085		60.5%
Tim Congdon	2,037		20.3%
David Campbell Bannerman	1,404		14.0%
Winston McKenzie	530		5.3%
Turnout		10,056	65.1%
Nigel Farage elected as Leader ✓
