= Douglas McWilliams =

British economic consultant

Douglas Francis McWilliams (born 24 November 1951) is a British economic consultant, specializing in forecasting and the technology sector.

After holding senior positions with IBM and the Confederation of British Industry, in 1992 he won a Sunday Times award and founded the Centre for Economics and Business Research. He was later Gresham Professor of Commerce at Gresham College in the City of London.

== Early life and education ==
Born in November 1951, McWilliams was educated at Stonyhurst College and the University of Oxford, gaining his first degree in philosophy, politics and economics and then graduating with a MPhil in economics.

== Career ==
McWilliams became Chief Economist for IBM (UK) and then was Chief Economic Adviser to the Confederation of British Industry from 1988 to 1992. In that year, he won the Sunday Times Golden Guru Award for best United Kingdom economic forecaster and founded the Centre for Economics and Business Research (CEBR). He was the Gresham College Professor of Commerce in 2012–14, lecturing on the economic impact of globalisation, and was succeeded by Jagjit Chadha.

In February 2012, together with Roger Bootle of Capital Economics, McWilliams was called to give evidence to the European Scrutiny Committee of the House of Commons on the Treaty on Stability, Coordination and Governance in the Economic and Monetary Union.

McWilliams's book The Flat White Economy (2015) details the digital sector, which he saw as driving the British economy, and rose to first position in the Amazon Business and Law Best Seller List. His The Inequality Paradox (2018) argues against Thomas Piketty's conclusion that increasing economic inequality is the result of exploitation. Driving the Silk Road (2020) is about his experience of driving a classic Bentley S1 on the Peking to Paris Endurance Rally of 2019 and his perceptions of economic conditions in the countries of Asia and Europe he drove through.

As of 2022, McWilliams is Deputy Chairman of CEBR, a member of the Council of the Institute for Fiscal Studies, Economic Adviser to the Chartered Institute of Marketing, and a member of the advisory board of e-Propelled, a US company which makes electric motors for pumps and vehicles.

== Personal life ==
McWilliams is son of the late Sir Francis McWilliams, an engineering consultant and former Lord Mayor of London. He is a lapsed Roman Catholic. In 1979, he married Ianthe Wright, whom he met on the river bank while cheering on Oxford in the Boat Race. They live in a large house in Regent's Park.

== Books ==
- Basic Economics: A Dictionary of Terms, Concepts, and Ideas (London: Arrow Books, 1976, with Tim Congdon) ISBN 978-0099130208
- The Renaissance of British Management (IBM Lecture, Kingston Business School, 25 May 1988)
- The Flat White Economy: How the Digital Economy Is Transforming London and Other Cities of the Future (London: Gerald Duckworth & Co, 2015) ISBN 978-0715649534
- The Inequality Paradox: How Capitalism Can Work for Everyone (New York: Overlook Press, November 2018; London: Abrams Press, September 2019) ISBN 978-1468314984
- Driving the Silk Road: Halfway Across the World in a Bentley S1 (Whitefox Publishing, 23 December 2019) ISBN 978-1912892716
