= Kyriakopoulou =

Kyriakopoulou is a surname. Notable people with the surname include:

- Nikoleta Kyriakopoulou (born 1986), Greek pole vaulter
- Danae Kyriakopoulou, Greek economist
