= Digital Mums =

British online education organisation

- Type: Private company
- Industry: Online education
- Founded: 2013
- Founders: Kathryn Tyler and Nikki Cochrane
- Defunct: 2022
- Fate: Liquidated
- Headquarters: Hackney, London, United Kingdom
- Area served: United Kingdom
- Website: digitalmums.com at the Wayback Machine (archived March 25, 2023)

Digital Mums was a British private education organisation founded by Co-CEOs Nikki Cochrane and Kathryn Tyler in late 2013.

The organisation was based in the UK and upskilled mothers in practical digital skills. The organisation directed its focus on providing part-time, online courses that helped equip graduates with job-ready skills so they could create flexible freelance careers.

Ten percent of all their profits went into a community interest company that funded women from low-income backgrounds to be able to do their training.

== History ==
Digital Mums began in 2013 as a social media marketing agency in Hackney, London founded by Kathryn Tyler and Nikki Cochrane. After the founders read a report by the Fawcett Society that found fiscal measures taken to reduce net public spending in the UK would have a disproportionate effect on women, it evolved into a training organisation focused on upskilling mothers.

In 2014 they received £50,000 of seed investment money from The Big Issue Invest to support their efforts. In March 2016 the company raised £285,000 in private equity and social investment funding to further scale the business.

In October 2016 the Co-Founders were jointly awarded Red Magazine's Woman of the Year award in recognition of Digital Mums’ contribution to reducing maternal discrimination in the UK.

In 2022, the company went into liquidation.

== Course Offerings ==
Digital Mums offered immersive, vocational courses in social media marketing lasting six and 12 months. Their courses were completed remotely and online, and incorporate real-life projects to get students job-ready.

Digital Mums has been accredited by the CPD Standards Office. They also offered Professional Career Development Loans through the UK government’s Skills Funding Agency, to help students in need of financial assistance fund their learning.

== Campaigns ==
Digital Mums has initiated several national campaigns supporting a number of causes related to flexible working and parenting.

In February 2016, they launched a campaign in response to the controversial Motherhood Challenge, a Facebook campaign where mothers posted photos of themselves with their kids and tagged other women who they thought to be ‘awesome’ mothers. Their hashtag campaign #RealMumMoments was a bid to show “motherhood is never perfect and far from easy” by providing a humorous spin on the Motherhood Challenge.

In September 2016, they produced a report in conjunction with the Centre for Economics and Business Research to look into the flexible working landscape for mothers in the UK. They found “...more than two thirds of stay-at-home mothers with young children would go back to work if flexible working was an option." They launched their #WorkThatWorks Movement in response to these figures as a way of opening up conversations around flexible working to support their drive to help mothers find rewarding careers that fit their skills and family life.

In July 2017, the organisation launched their second campaign under the #WorkThatWorks Movement called #CleanUpTheFWord, which aimed to change the negative perception of flexible working. The campaign focused on new research conducted with YouGov that showed 7 in 10 UK employees want flexible work but over half fear it would be viewed negatively by their employer. They petitioned the UK government to change its definition of flexible working from "a way of working that suits an employee’s needs" to one that focuses on the benefits to employers too. Their campaign attracted the attention of the Equalities and Human Rights Commission who they worked with on a new definition for flexible working.
