= 2009 UK Independence Party leadership election =

United Kingdom independence party (UKIP) leadership election

- 2009
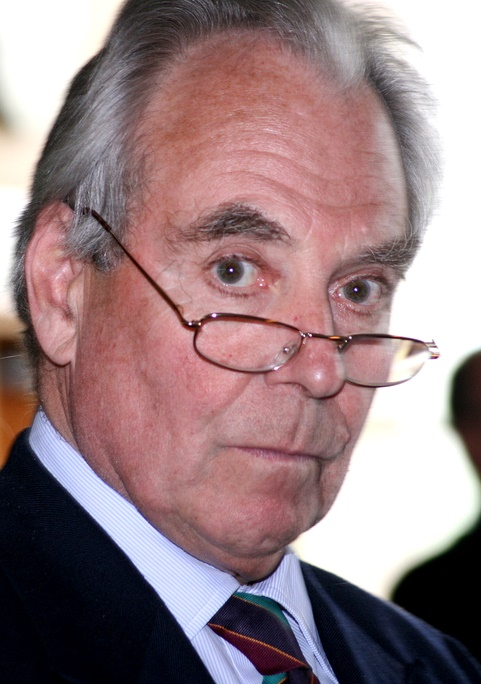

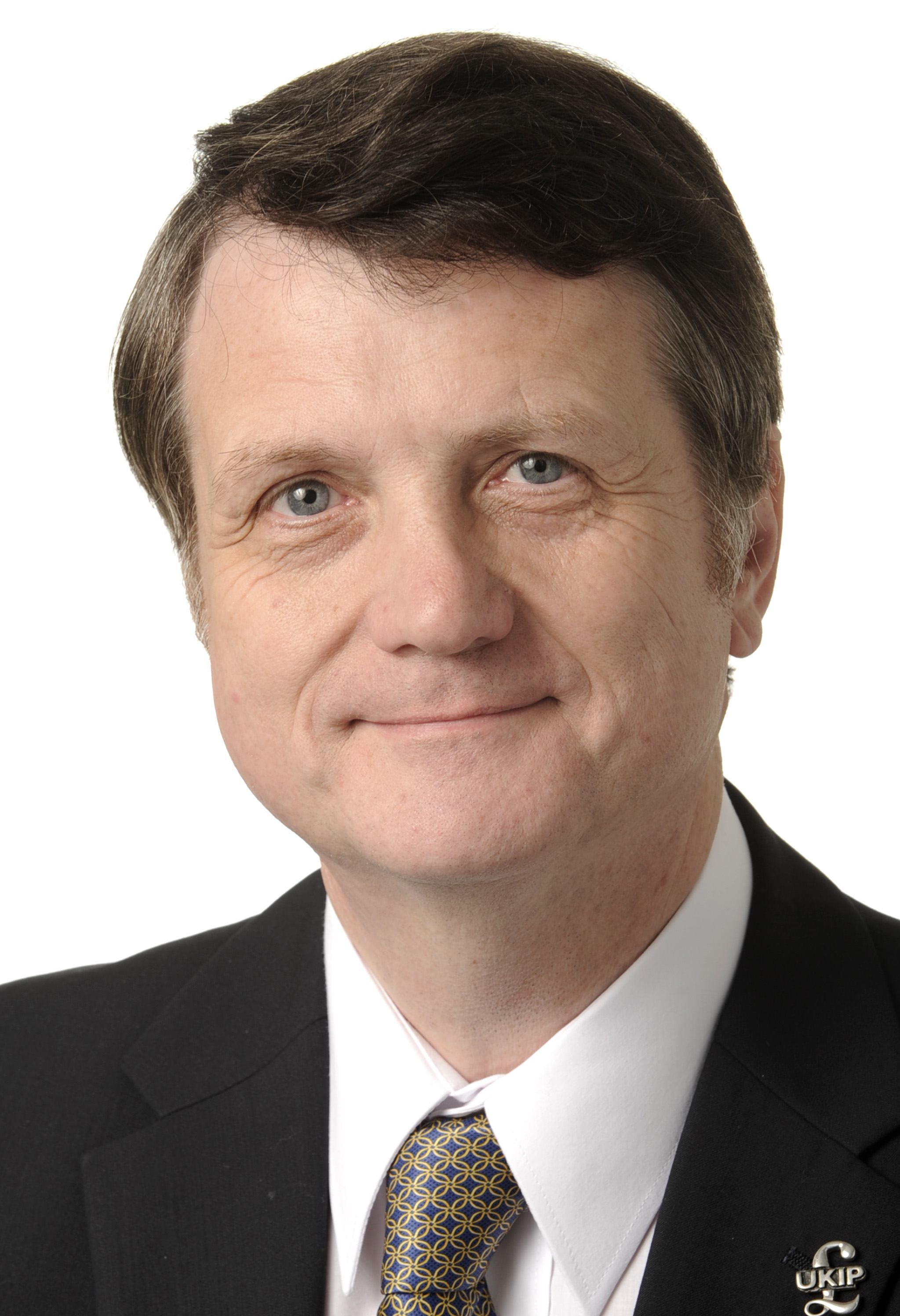

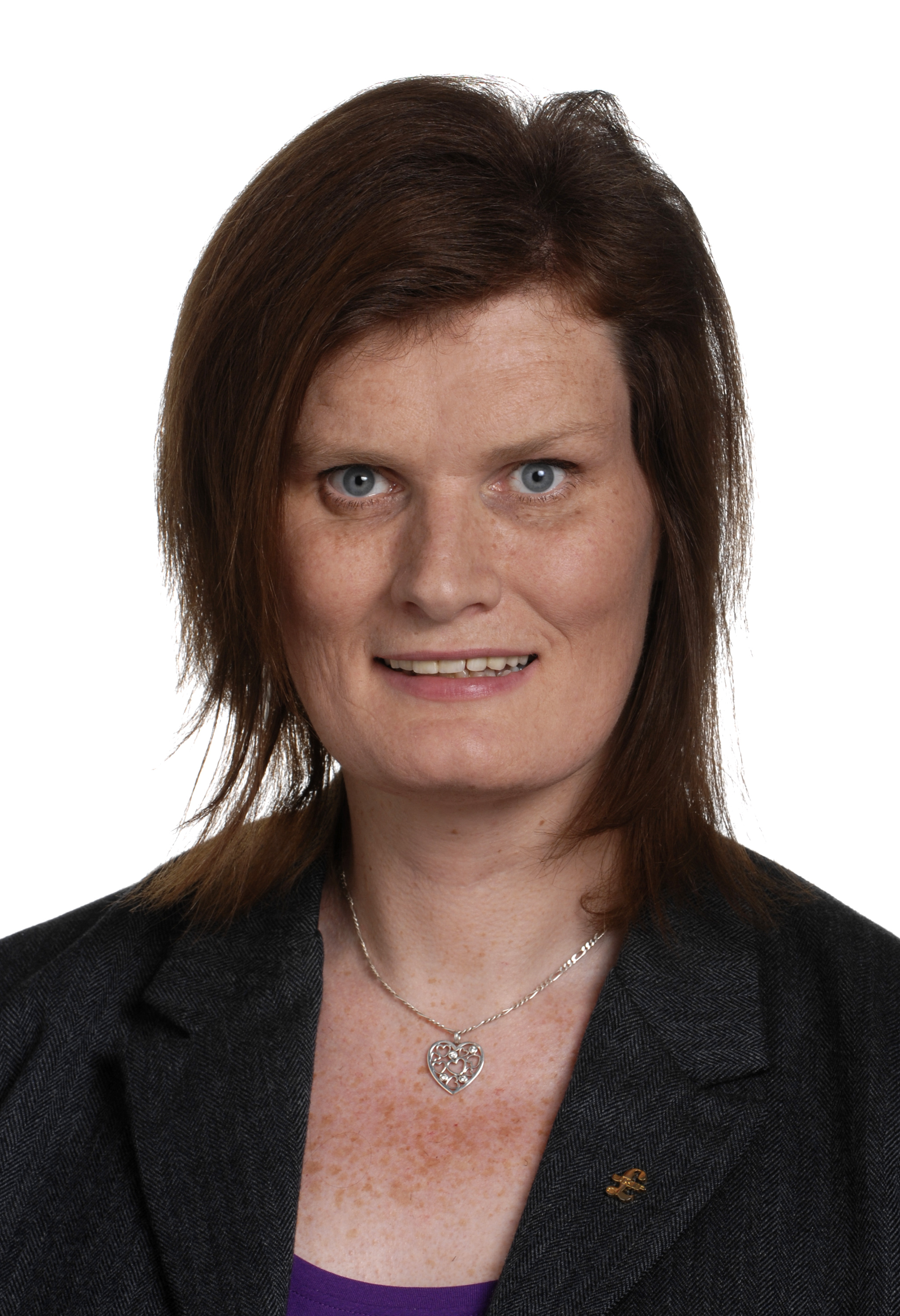

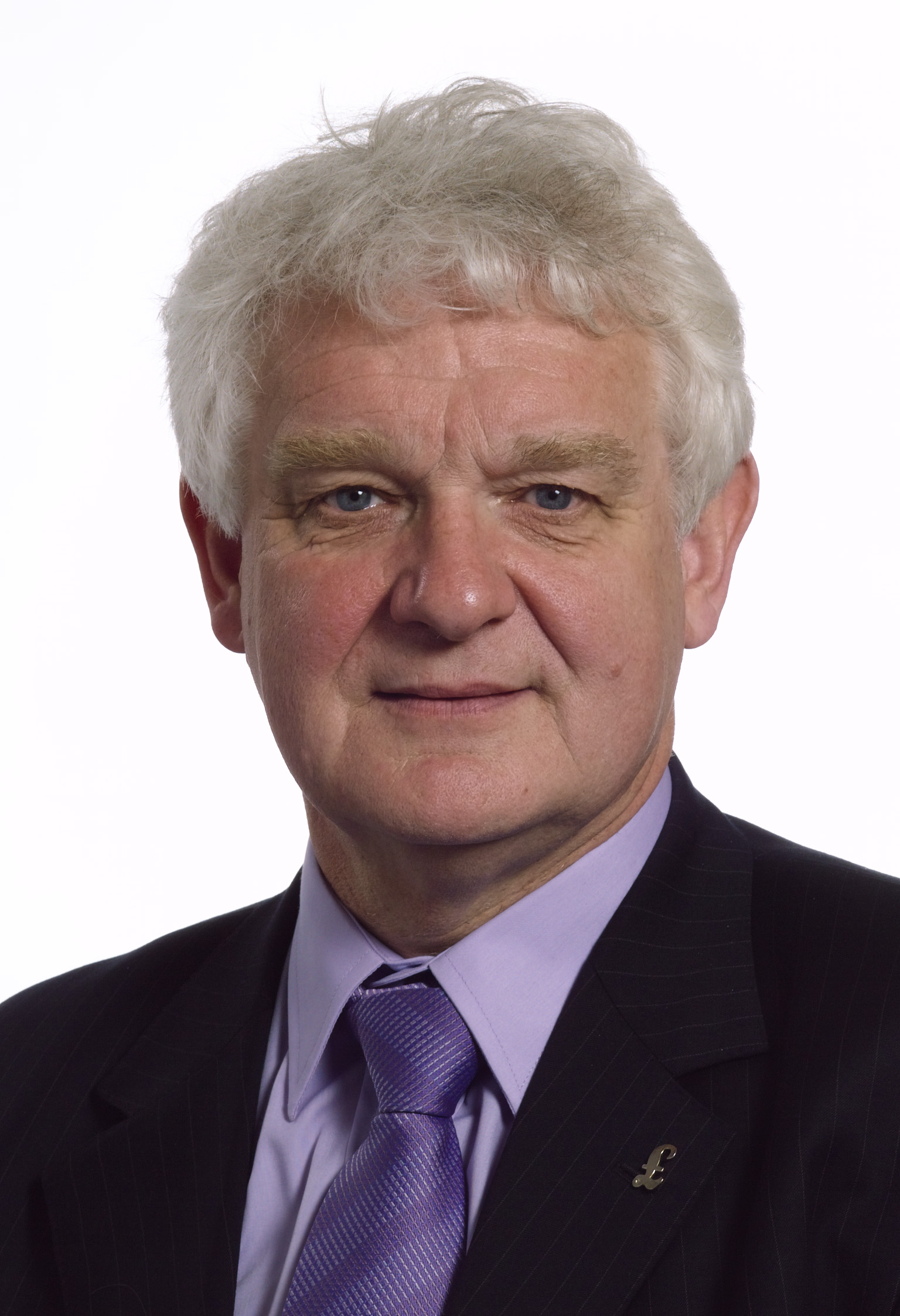
Candidate	Lord Pearson	Gerard Batten	Nikki Sinclaire
Popular vote	4,743	2,571	1,214
Percentage	47.7%	25.9%	12.2%
Candidate	Mike Nattrass	Alan Wood
Popular vote	1,092	315
Percentage	11.0%	3.2%
Leader before election
Nigel Farage
Elected Leader
Lord Pearson

The UK Independence Party (UKIP) held a leadership election in 2009, with ballots closing on 26 November. The election was won by Malcolm Pearson.

The Eurosceptic party had been led by Nigel Farage since he won the 2006 leadership election. He announced his resignation from the post in September 2009, stating that he wanted to devote more time to his campaign for a seat in the House of Commons.

== Candidates ==
There were five candidates for the election.

Gerard Batten was a Member of the European Parliament (MEP) and stood unsuccessfully in the 2008 London mayoral election. His main policies were to broaden the party's policies beyond Euroscepticism, and to focus on winning representation at Westminster.

Mike Nattrass was also an MEP. His main policies were to focus on the upcoming general election, opposition to the Conservative Party, and to reject a merger with similar parties elsewhere in Europe.

Lord Pearson was a member of the House of Lords. Originally appointed as a Conservative Party peer, he joined UKIP in 2007. His main policies included a focus on direct democracy and on opposition to Islamism. He had the support of Farage, who declared that Pearson was the only "serious, credible" candidate. He also had the support of the party's deputy leader, David Campbell Bannerman, who had been expected to stand in the election. The Daily Telegraph declared in September that Pearson was the favourite to win the election.

Nikki Sinclaire was another MEP. Her main policies were to professionalise the party, introducing a shadow cabinet, and to focus on communication through the media.

Alan Wood was UKIP's nominating officer and a district councillor. His main policy was to focus on an alliance with other Eurosceptic parties, although not with the British National Party. He was also opposed to Pearson's policy of prioritising anti-Islamism.

== Result ==
Pearson was elected, taking almost half of the votes cast.

UK Independence Party leadership election, 2009
Candidate	Votes	%
Lord Pearson	4,743	47.7
Gerard Batten	2,571	25.9
Nikki Sinclaire	1,214	12.2
Mike Nattrass	1,092	11.0
Alan Wood	315	3.2
Turnout	9,935	
