= Jack Mahoney (ethicist) =

Scottish academic (1931–2024)

The Reverend Fr Jack Mahoney SJ
- Born: John Aloysius Mahoney; 14 January 1931
- Died: 23 October 2024 (aged 93)

Academic work
- Discipline: Moral theologian
- Sub-discipline: Christian ethics; applied ethics; business ethics
- Institutions: Heythrop College, London; King's College London; London Business School

John Aloysius Mahoney SJ (14 January 1931 – 23 October 2024) was a Scottish Jesuit, moral theologian, and academic, specialising in applied ethics and business ethics.

Mahoney was principal of Heythrop College, London from 1976 to 1981, F. D. Maurice Professor of Moral and Social Theology at King's College, London from 1986 to 1993, and Dixons Professor of Business Ethics and Social Responsibility at the London Business School from 1993 to 1998. He was also Gresham Professor of Commerce between 1988 and 1993.

Mahoney died in Boscombe on 23 October 2024, at the age of 93.

== Selected works ==
- Mahoney, John (1987). The Making of Moral Theology: Study of the Roman Catholic Tradition. Oxford: Clarendon Press. ISBN 978-0198264521.
- Mahoney, Jack (1990). Teaching Business Ethics in the United Kingdom, Europe and the United States of America: A Comparative Study. London: Athlone Press. ISBN 978-0485113990.
- Mahoney, Jack (2006). The Challenge of Human Rights: Origin, Development, and Significance. Oxford: Blackwell Publishing. ISBN 978-1405152402.
- Mahoney, Jack (2011). Christianity in Evolution: An Exploration. Washington, DC: Georgetown University Press. ISBN 978-1589017696.
