= TS Lombard =

Macroeconomic forecasting consultancy firm

- Type: Privately Held
- Industry: Financial services
- Founded: London, England (1989)
- Founder: Tim Congdon
- Headquarters: London, City of London, United Kingdom
- Key people: Andrew Williams (Chairman); Charles Dumas (Head of Research)
- Total assets: (£2.5m)
- Number of employees: 50
- Parent: GlobalData
- Website: www.tslombard.com

TS Lombard, formerly known as Lombard Street Research, is a macroeconomic forecasting consultancy firm headquartered in London with offices in New York and Hong Kong. It is a division of GlobalData after being acquired in 2022. Before acquisition it provided research and advisory services to asset managers, hedge funds, pension funds, central banks, private equity funds, investment banks and corporations.

== History ==
The company was founded as LSR in 1989 by Tim Congdon, a British economist specialising in the monetarist approach to macroeconomic policy. Charles Dumas joined the firm in 1998, to take over the international forecasting service, and became chief economist in 2005.

Since 1989, TS Lombard has stated that its aim is to provide global investors with independent, provocative economic analysis and investment advice that challenges the consensus.

TS Lombard's forecasting methodology combined Keynesian and monetary economics. It used analysis of money supply, sector financial balances and flow of funds in its forecasting methodology. In 2005, TS Lombard was among the few forecasters to predict the 2008 financial crisis.

The company was acquired by TSL Research Group in 2016.

The company was then acquired by GlobalData in September 2022, with GlobalData stating that the acquisition will allow Lombard to provide their services to more areas of the asset management industry.

== Services ==
TS Lombard investment research coverage includes the United States, China, Eurozone, the United Kingdom, Japan and South Korea.
