= Gresham Professor of Commerce =

The Professor of Business at Gresham College, London, gives free educational lectures to the general public. The college was founded for this purpose in 1597, when it appointed seven professors.

The chair was created in 1985, sponsored by the Mercers' School Memorial Trust, administered by the Worshipful Company of Mercers. It was originally named the Gresham Professor of Commerce, but in 2018, it was renamed to Gresham Professor of Business.

== List of Gresham Professors of Business ==
	Name	Started
1.	Jules Goddard	1985
2.	Jack Mahoney SJ	1988
3.	Walter Eltis	1993
4.	Tom Cannon	1996
5.	Daniel Hodson	1999
6.	Avinash Persaud	2002
7.	Michael Mainelli	2005
8.	Kenneth Costa	2009
9.	Douglas McWilliams	2012
10.	Jagjit Chadha OBE	2014
11.	Alex Edmans	2018
12.	Raghavendra Rau	2022
13.	Daniel Susskind	2025
