= David Campbell Bannerman =

British politician (born 1960)

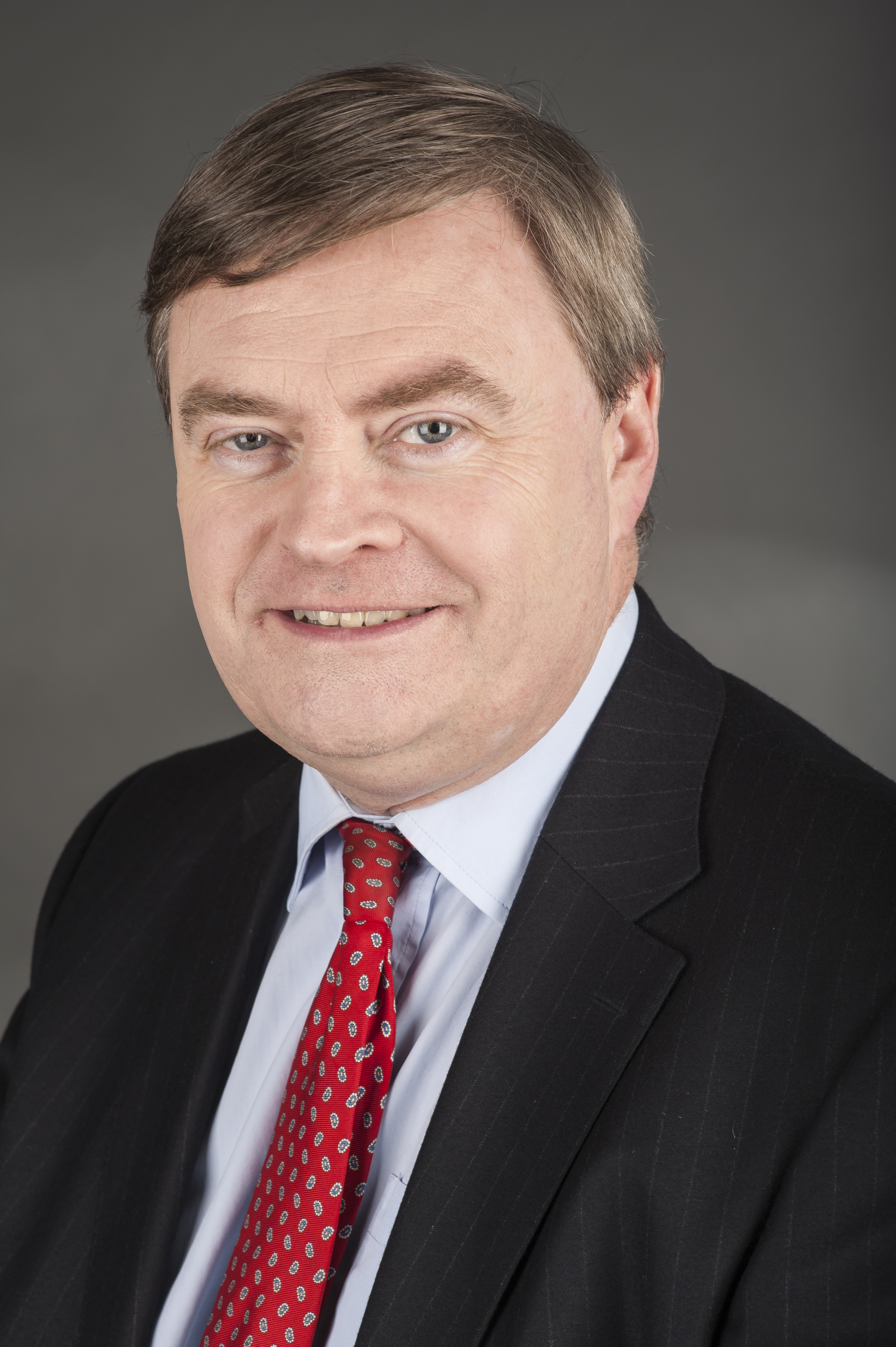
- David Campbell Bannerman, 2014

Deputy Leader of the UK Independence Party
- In office 27 September 2006 – 8 November 2010 Serving with The Viscount Monckton of Brenchley (Jun 2010 – Nov 2010)
- Leader: Nigel Farage; The Lord Pearson of Rannoch; Nigel Farage
- Preceded by: Mike Nattrass
- Succeeded by: Paul Nuttall

Member of the European Parliament for East of England
- In office 20 July 2009 – 1 July 2019
- Preceded by: Tom Wise
- Succeeded by: Lucy Nethsingha

Personal details
- Born: 26 May 1960 (age 66) Bombay, India
- Party: Reform UK (2026–present); Conservative (1985–2004; 2011–2026); UKIP (2004–2011)
- Education: University of Edinburgh; University of Pennsylvania

David Campbell Bannerman (born 28 May 1960) is a British politician who served as Member of the European Parliament (MEP) for the East of England from 2009 to 2019. He was chairman of the Conservative Democratic Organisation and The Freedom Association. He previously served as Deputy Leader of UK Independence Party (UKIP) from 2006 until 2010, when he was replaced by Paul Nuttall. Since 2026, he has been a member of Reform UK.

Before joining UKIP, he was a Conservative Party activist who came to prominence as Chairman of the Bow Group. He stood for the UK Parliament as a Conservative at the 1997 election in Glasgow Rutherglen and in 2001 in Warwick and Leamington. Campbell Bannerman joined UKIP in 2004, and was elected to the European Parliament in 2009. In 2011, he defected back to the Conservative Party.

He has been a long-term critic of the European Union, and has had many roles in eurosceptic advocacy groups. In 2015, he became co-chairman of a new eurosceptic pressure group, Conservatives for Britain. In 2016, he joined the political advisory board of Leave Means Leave. He joined Reform UK in 2026.

== Early life ==
Born in 1960 in Bombay, India (now Mumbai), Campbell Bannerman is a distant relative of former Prime Minister Henry Campbell-Bannerman. He is a cousin of Max Bannerman MSP.

Campbell Bannerman was educated at Bryanston School, the University of Edinburgh, where he graduated MA in Economics and Politics, and the Wharton School of the University of Pennsylvania.

== Jobs held ==
Campbell Bannerman became Head of Communications at United News & Media in 2000. He currently works for public relations firm Burson Marsteller.

== Political career ==
=== Conservatives: 1992–2004 ===
Campbell Bannerman was a member of the Conservative Party, as a borough councillor in Royal Tunbridge Wells from 1992–1996. He was chairman of the Bow Group from 1993 to 1994 and Special Advisor to Sir Patrick Mayhew (then MP for Tunbridge Wells) from 1996 to 1997 while Mayhew was Secretary of State for Northern Ireland.

In 1997, he stood for the Conservatives in Glasgow Rutherglen and in 2001 in Warwick and Leamington where he obtained 37.6% of the vote in second place.

=== UKIP: 2004–2011 ===
After joining UKIP in 2004, Campbell Bannerman stood as that party's candidate for North Cornwall in the 2005 General Election. He attracted 3063 votes. He was appointed Party Chairman in December 2005, following the resignation of Petrina Holdsworth.

In 2006, he stood for the leadership of the UK Independence Party, attaining third place with 1,443 votes, after Richard Suchorzewski. After that election, he was appointed Deputy Leader by Nigel Farage, who had won the election.

During the 2007 Scottish Parliament Elections, he stood as UKIP's Holyrood Regional List candidate for the Highlands and Islands. His campaign gained UKIP 1,287 votes (0.7%), down 0.5% from UKIP's 2003 campaign. In 2009, he was elected to the European Parliament after UKIP won 19.6% of the vote in the East of England region.

Bannerman was the main author of UKIP's 2010 election manifesto. Following the resignation of UKIP leader Lord Pearson, in 2010 Campbell Bannerman announced his intention to stand for the leadership of UKIP for a second time, but came third, behind Nigel Farage and Tim Congdon.

=== Conservative: 2011–2026 ===
Campbell Bannerman returned to the Conservative Party on 24 May 2011 and sat with the European Conservatives and Reformists group as a Conservative MEP in the European Parliament until the end of his term in 2019. From 2014 he served as chairman of the Parliament's delegation to Iraq. In July 2018, while commenting on media suggestions that British fighters for the Islamic State should be tried under treason laws, he additionally suggested that treason laws should cover British citizens with "extreme loyalty" to the European Union. This comment led to widespread criticism: Labour Party MP Virendra Sharma said he was "suggesting putting the knife into free speech" and European Parliament Brexit representative Guy Verhofstadt calling his comments "insane".

In 2023, it was reported that he intended to seek the Conservative nomination for South Norfolk at the 2024 general election. As a supporter of Boris Johnson this caused controversy among the local association. Later in the year Poppy Simister-Thomas was selected as the candidate. In the general election, the seat went Labour.

Party political offices
Preceded by Petrina Holdsworth	Chairman of the UK Independence Party; 2005–2006	Succeeded by John Whittaker
Preceded by Mike Nattrass	Deputy Leader of the UK Independence Party (with Lord Monckton, 2010); 2006–2010	Succeeded by Paul Nuttall
