= Jagjit Chadha =

British economist

Jagjit Chadha OBE
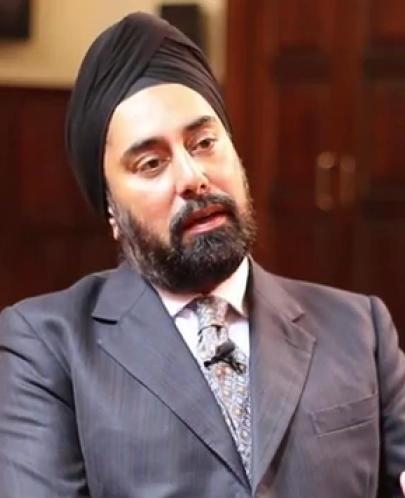
- Jagjit Chadha at Gresham College, 2014
- Scientific career
- Fields: Macroeconomics
- Workplaces: NIESR; Cambridge

Jagjit Singh Chadha OBE (Punjabi: ਜਗਜੀਤ ਸਿੰਘ ਚਢਾ, born 1 December 1966 in West Yorkshire) is a British economist who is the Director of the National Institute of Economic and Social Research.

== Research Interests ==
His research interests are in monetary theory, macroeconomic stabilisation and the history of business cycles and financial evolution. He is particularly interested in the role of financial intermediation as a source and propagation mechanism for economic shocks.

== Views on Current Economic Policy ==
He is an advocate of flexible inflation targeting with central bank communications involving statements on the paths of policy rates under different scenarios. ("An Open letter to Andrew Bailey")

He has been highly critical of the duration and size of the Central Bank QE programmes. (Financial Times, 9th June 2022)

He has long argued for a complete rehaul of the fiscal framework and its deployment of arbitrary and malleable rules. ("Designing a New Fiscal Framework: Understanding and Confronting Uncertainty", National Institute of Economic and Social Research Occasional Paper no.61)

His work during Covid regularly outlined how the lack of a plan and objective led to policy drift. (Commentary: Whither After Covid-19 and Brexit: A Social Science Perspective. from UK Economic Outlook Winter 2021 (NIESR))

== Education and Professional History ==
Prior to taking up his position at NIESR in 2016, he was Professor and Chair in Money and Banking in the Department of Economics at the University of Kent. He was concurrently Professor of Commerce at Gresham College from 2014–18 and was Chair of the Money, Macro and Finance Research Group from 2011 to 2017 (now Money Macro and Finance Society) and has acted as a specialist adviser to the Treasury Select Committee on several occasions. He is also a part-time, Visiting Professor of Economics at Cambridge University.

Chadha obtained his education from The John Lyon School followed by an undergraduate degree from University College London culminating with a Master’s degree from the London School of Economics. He then became an advisor and researcher at the Bank of England working on monetary economics, in particular on the interaction of financial markets and monetary regimes.

Chadha was appointed Officer of the Order of the British Empire (OBE) in the 2021 Birthday Honours for services to economics and economic policy.

== Advisory Roles ==
Chadha has acted as an academic adviser to HM Treasury, the Bank of England, the Treasury Select Committee and other policy-making institutions outside the UK, in particular the Bank for International Settlements. He is the current Editor of the series Modern Macroeconomic Policy-making published by Cambridge University Press. And is the managing editor of the National Institute Economic Review.

Jagjit sat on the ESRC’s research committee and then on its Strategic Advisory Network. He is also an executive member of the Productivity Institute and chairs the Productivity Commission.

He was elected to the Council of the Royal Economic Society in 2019 for a five year term.

Over his time at NIESR, the Economic Statistics Centre of Excellence (ESCoE) was established at NIESR with the ONS in 2019.

He is a lead Editor of the Economics Observatory and on the Advisory Council of the Bennett Institute.

NIESR set up the UK Business Cycle Dating Committee in 2018 with Chadha as Chair.

== Media and Opinions ==
He appears regularly as a commentator on economics on BBC, ITV, Channel 4, Sky News and Bloomberg.

His Op-Eds have appeared in the FT, Guardian, Spectator, New Statesman, Prospect, the Times, Independent and Central Banking.

Selected videos:

- Interview with Liam Halligan on Channel 4's "Dispatches" in February 2021
- Discussion on Channel 4 in Darlington on the cost-of-living crisis

Chadha has appeared twice on special editions of "University Challenge"

== Publications ==
- The Money Minders: The Parables, Trade-off and Lags of Central Banking (Cambridge University Press, 2022)
- The Euro in Danger, with Michael Dempster and Derry Pickford (Searching Finance, 2012)
- Modern Macroeconomic Policy Making (Cambridge University Press, 2010)
- Dynamic Macroeconomic Analysis: Theory and Policy in General Equilibrium, co-edited with Sumru Altug and Charles Nolan (Cambridge University Press, 2003)
