= Nikki Sinclaire =

British politician (born 1968)

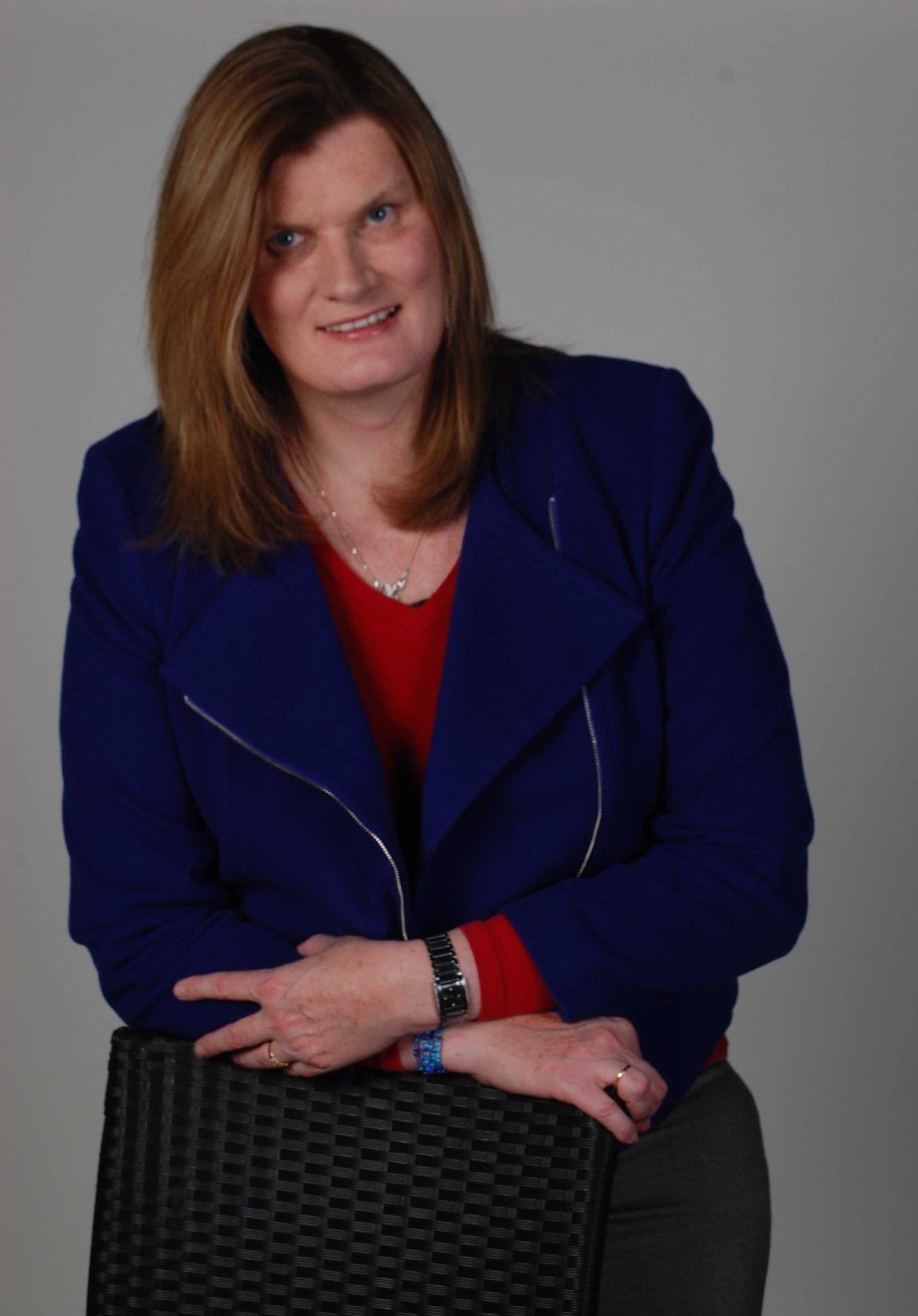
- Sinclaire in 2014

Leader of We Demand a Referendum Now
- In office September 2012 – 30 June 2014
- Preceded by: Office created
- Succeeded by: Office abolished

Member of the European Parliament for West Midlands
- In office 14 July 2009 – 30 June 2014
- Preceded by: Neena Gill
- Succeeded by: Neena Gill

Personal details
- Born: 26 July 1968 (age 58) London, England
- Party: We Demand a Referendum (2012–14)
- Other political affiliations: UK Independence Party (until 2010)
- Education: University of Kent
- Website: http://www.simplynikki.org/

Nicole Sinclaire (born 26 July 1968) is a British former politician who was leader of the We Demand a Referendum Party, and served as a Member of the European Parliament for the West Midlands from 2009 to 2014.

She was elected MEP in June 2009, as a UK Independence Party candidate but later resigned from the Europe of Freedom and Democracy (EFD) group in which UKIP sat as a part in the European Parliament, citing the alleged extreme right-wing views of some of the group's members, including outspoken views condemning homosexuals and migrants. Subsequently, Sinclaire sat as an Independent MEP from January 2010 until September 2012, during which time she set up the We Demand a Referendum Now party. She was defeated in the 2014 elections, saying in a statement on her website: "my employers have spoken, and it would seem I have been unsuccessful in my attempt to be re-elected as an MEP for the West Midlands region."

Sinclaire was the first ever trans British parliamentarian.

== Early life ==
Sinclaire was born in London and educated at the University of Kent at Canterbury, read for a Bachelor of Laws (LLB) degree. She has worked for Lloyds Black Horse Life as a 'problem troubleshooter', was employed as a Gateway store manager, and worked in Cyprus in the hospitality sector. She was a Conservative before joining UKIP.

== Political career ==
=== UKIP years ===
Sinclaire's UKIP posts included Head Office Manager (1999–2001), member of the National Executive Committee (NEC), and Party Secretary under the leadership of Roger Knapman.

In 2001, she was disqualified from the NEC, shortly after being elected. In 2003, representing herself, she took UKIP to the High Court, successfully overturning her disqualification. In 2004, she became Party Secretary, a position which she left to become political assistant and advisor to Mike Nattrass, MEP for the West Midlands (2004–09).

Sinclaire stood for the UK Parliament twice as a UKIP candidate: in Medway in 2001 and in Halesowen and Rowley Regis in 2005. At the 2001 general election, she was the party's campaign manager for the three Kent constituencies of Medway, Gillingham, and Chatham & Aylesford.

During the 2005 general election campaign, Sinclaire stood as the UKIP candidate for Halesowen & Rowley Regis, more than doubling the previous UKIP vote. She was arrested after refusing to leave a public debate, "Queer Question Time" (to discuss issues related to the gay community) but was released without charge a few hours later.

In October 2008, it was reported that Sinclaire briefly met Baroness Thatcher at a Bruges Group dinner. Sinclaire told Thatcher that she would be standing as an MEP candidate for the UK Independence Party in the West Midlands. According to the BBC report, Thatcher replied "Good for you. Never give up, never give up".

She has also campaigned abroad, most notably in the United States, assisting on campaigns for US Representative Susan Davis, a Democrat, and California Governor Arnold Schwarzenegger, a Republican.

==== Election to European Parliament ====
In the 2009 European elections, Sinclaire was elected as a UKIP Member of the European Parliament for the West Midlands region, while holding the second place on the UKIP list. Thus she became the first openly lesbian member of the European Parliament for the UK delegation.

On 11 September 2009, Sinclaire announced she would stand in the 2009 UKIP leadership election. Her decision to stand followed Nigel Farage's announcement on 4 September that he would stand down as UKIP leader to stand in the general election against John Bercow in Buckinghamshire. The leadership ballot was won by Lord Pearson of Rannoch, with Sinclaire coming third with 1,214 votes.

==== 65th Anniversary of the Liberation of Auschwitz ====
Sinclaire was invited, as a guest of the European Jewish Congress, to take part in events at Auschwitz, in January 2010, to mark the 65th anniversary of its liberation, and found herself as the only British Member of the European Parliament attending the event.

=== Departure from UKIP ===
In January 2010, Sinclaire resigned from the Europe of Freedom and Democracy (EFD) grouping in the European Parliament, to which UKIP belongs, citing her displeasure at what she claimed to be some of the racist, extremist parties in membership of the EFD Group. She also cited a deterioration in her relationship with Nigel Farage, the joint leader of the EFD group.

Sinclaire was subsequently expelled from UKIP for refusing to be part of the EFD group. On its website, UKIP stated:

"She has also proved unable to collaborate adequately with the voluntary party in the UK, particularly with the regional committee in the West Midlands. The national executive committee has therefore removed the whip; Nikki Sinclaire may no longer describe herself as a UKIP MEP, and she may not stand as a UKIP candidate in the forthcoming general election."

Sinclaire won an Employment Tribunal claim for sex discrimination against her former colleagues. UKIP did not lodge a defence in the action.

=== Independent ===
==== After UKIP ====
Sinclaire stood in the 2010 general election in Meriden. She used the label 'Solihull and Meriden Residents Association', and was endorsed by the Libertarian Party. Amongst her opponents was a candidate endorsed by UKIP. She won 1.3% of the vote, compared with 2.6% for the UKIP candidate.

==== Delegation to Tunisia ====
Sinclaire was the only UK politician to be chosen to fly to Tunisia in early February 2011, as part of an international delegation following the ousting of President Zine al-Abidine Ben Ali.

==== Campaign for a referendum ====
Sinclaire launched a campaign for a referendum in July 2010, with the aim of collecting 100,000 signatures calling for a referendum on the UK's continued membership of the European Union.

The campaign's first roadshow was held in Stoke-on-Trent on 29 July 2010 and visited over 50 towns and cities in the West Midlands alone.

Alongside her weekly road shows, Campaign for a Referendum created a 'People's Petition' magazine which is in its fourth issue. The magazine gathered cross party support.

==== Taking the petition to Parliament ====
Sinclaire announced that the petition had collected the necessary 100,000 signatures on 9 August 2011. The signatures were officially delivered to Downing Street on 8 September 2011. Sinclaire was joined by MEPs Mike Nattrass and Trevor Colman, along with MPs Kate Hoey, Nigel Dodds and Kelvin Hopkins.

Campaign for a Referendum went to Manchester for the 2011 Conservative Party conference. Whilst at the conference, she spoke to Prime Minister David Cameron. When asked about the subject, Mr Cameron acknowledged that the petition had been delivered.

A date for the debate in commons on this issue was set for 27 October, which was then changed to 24 October, allowing for the Prime Minister and William Hague to attend.

The motion on a referendum was defeated, but the result caused the largest rebellion against a Conservative Prime Minister over Europe. 79 Conservative MPs voted for the motion, with a further two Conservative abstentions and two acting as tellers for the motion. 19 Labour MPs defied the party whip, alongside one Liberal Democrat.

Despite the defeat in Parliament, the Birmingham Post reported that she planned to continue the fight of a referendum and on 31 October 2011, Sinclaire launched the second phase of the petition, which called for a referendum on whether to negotiate the UK's withdrawal from the European Union, invoking Article 50 of the Lisbon Treaty. A second petition with 100,000 names was delivered to 10 Downing Street in September 2012.

==== Campaigning against Irish fiscal treaty ====
Sinclaire and a “posse of 20 followers” travelled to Ireland distributing anti-treaty leaflets. The presence of Sinclaire and Nigel Farage was reported by journalist Karen Coleman as about their own "anti-EU agendas" which had "little to do with what's best for Ireland".

==== Armed Forces Parliamentary Scheme ====
Sinclaire enrolled onto the Armed Forces Parliamentary Scheme in October 2009.

As a part of this scheme she visited Afghanistan in November 2011, where she was alarmed to speak to troops who worried about how their families were being looked after at home in the UK.

==== Football in the community ====
Sinclaire sponsored 13 players during the 2011–12 season from teams across her constituency, ranging from the Conference North to the Premier League. Sinclaire.

Sinclaire sponsored and distributed a leaflet in August 2012, for Worcester City Football Club to help promote their final season at their St George's Lane ground.

==== Meriden travellers ====
Sinclaire has worked alongside local residents group RAID in protesting against an unauthorised gypsy camp on the Eaves Green Lane site in Meriden, West Midlands.

The Travellers on the Eaves Green Lane site were told they would have to leave and were given a year to move on by Solihull Council in a court hearing in May 2012.

==== HS2 ====
Sinclaire is an active campaigner against the HS2 project which aims to link Birmingham and London by High Speed Rail.

The Birmingham Post featured her argument with the council about the removal of her anti-HS2 signs.

==== Aston Arena ====
She has protested to save the Aston Arena, a sport centre based in Aston Birmingham. She delivered a petition to 10 Downing Street with a local charity calling for the Government to save the sports centre.

Sinclaire also led a protest at Birmingham Council house against the demolition of the sports facility.

=== We Demand a Referendum Party ===
Sinclaire founded the We Demand a Referendum Party in September 2012, with which she planned to contest all British constituencies in the 2014 EU elections. However, the party's only candidates were in her West Midlands European constituency. Sinclaire spoke at the We Demand a Referendum inaugural conference on 5 October 2012.

=== United States elections of 2012 ===
Sinclaire campaigned before the United States elections of 2012 in Richmond, Virginia. Sinclaire supported Tim Kaine in his successful bid to become a US Senator representing Virginia. Sinclaire also canvassed in support of the successful bid of Barack Obama's re-election to the US Presidency.

=== Kashmir ===
Sinclaire sponsored the 8th annual Kashmir week in the European Parliament in June 2013. Sinclaire spoke in a press conference supporting the right to self-determination of the Kashmiri people has said that she will continue to bring the Kashmiri issue to the political agenda of the European Union (EU).

=== Edinburgh Festival Fringe 2013 ===
Sinclaire announced her one-off Edinburgh Fringe Show on 13 August 2013. The show, called "The EU – It's not funny" is a political satire.

== Allegations of fraud, misconduct ==
On 22 February 2012, Sinclaire was arrested along with three other people; two women aged 55 and 39, as well as a 19-year-old man on suspicion of conspiracy to defraud the European Parliament following an inquiry into an allegation made in 2010, concerning allowances and expenses. Sinclaire denied all the charges and cooperated with the police. On 23 July 2014, she was charged with money laundering, contrary to Sections 327 or 329 of the Proceeds of Crime Act 2002, and misconduct in public office, contrary to Common Law, relating to European Parliament travel expenses, in a period between October 2009 and July 2010. On 11 July 2016, the jury in Sinclaire's trial found her not guilty on all counts.

Sinclaire criticised the West Midlands Police investigation as a 'Vanity Case' as it cost £1.5 million to pursue the case regarding a sum of £3,200 that Sinclaire was alleged to have fraudulently claimed.

== Electoral history ==
Year	Constituency	Party	Votes	%	±%
2001	Medway	UKIP	958	2.5	+1.6
2005	Halesowen and Rowley Regis	UKIP	1,974	4.8	+2.4
2009 (European)	West Midlands	UKIP	300,471	21.3	+3.8
2010	Meriden	Solihull and Meriden Residents' Association	658	1.3	New party
2014 (European)	West Midlands	We Demand a Referendum Now	23,426	0.14	New party

== Personal life ==
Sinclaire was assigned male at birth, but felt she was "trapped in the wrong body" from the age of three. At 16, Sinclaire was told by a doctor that these feelings were a "fantasy"; she was also told that she could not undergo gender reassignment surgery until the age of 21. Sinclaire took hormone replacement therapy, prior to beginning surgery at the age of 23. Sinclaire publicly spoke about her gender identity in November 2013, making her the first openly transgender Parliamentarian in the UK.

In 2004, Sinclaire came out as lesbian in a letter to the LGBTQ newspaper The Pink Paper. However, she stated that she had no desire to be the leader of an LGBT group within UKIP.
