= We Demand a Referendum Now =

- Leader: Nikki Sinclaire
- Founded: 2012
- Dissolved: 2014
- Ideology: Euroscepticism
- Colours: Teal/Purple

Website
- http://www.letthepeopledecide.eu

We Demand a Referendum Now (WDARN) was a minor British political party, launched by independent Member of the European Parliament (MEP) Nikki Sinclaire in June 2012, following her departure from the UK Independence Party (UKIP). It was a single-issue party that sought to force a referendum on British membership of the European Union (EU).

We Demand a Referendum Now was registered with the Electoral Commission in June 2012 by Nikki Sinclaire. The party held its inaugural conference on 5 October 2012.

The party ran a slate of candidates in the West Midlands European Parliament constituency for the 2014 European Parliament elections. It had originally announced plans to stand candidates in every British region. The party received 1.7% of the vote in the West Midlands, and did not win any seats.

We Demand a Referendum aimed to "go beyond party politics" and "do everything within [its] power to enable a referendum". Its leadership accused the EU of being protectionist and called for the creation of a royal commission to look into the costs and benefits of EU membership for the United Kingdom.

== European Parliament ==
European Parliament
Election year	# of total votes	% of overall vote	# of seats won	Rank
2014	23,426 ▲	0.14% ▲	0 / 73	20 ▲
