= Centre for Economics and Business Research =

British economic consultancy

Centre for Economics and Business Research (Cebr)
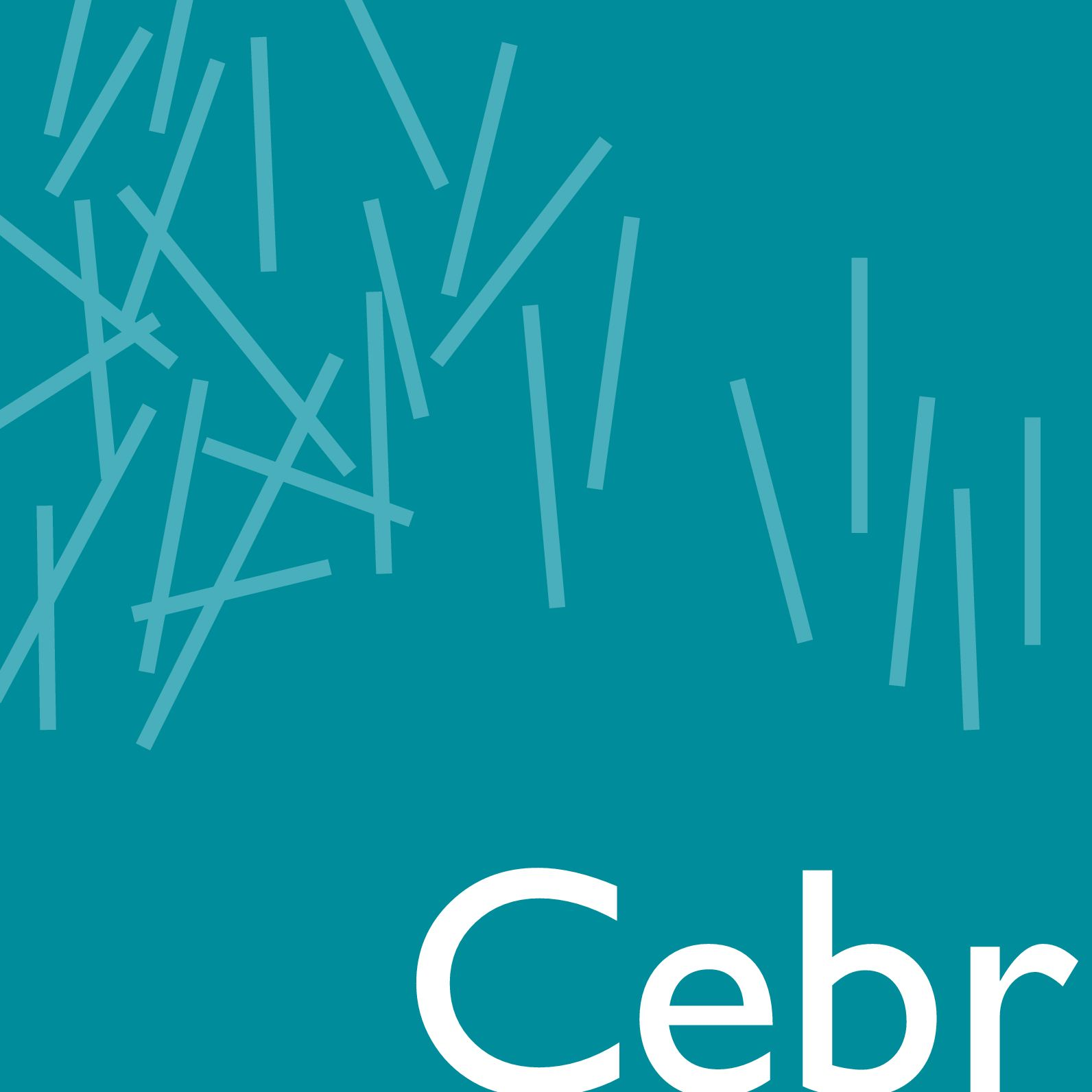
- Founded: 1992; 33 years ago
- Type: Privately held company consultancy
- Headquarters: 4 Bath Street; London EC1V 9DX; United Kingdom
- Location: London, England
- Key people: Douglas McWilliams (founder, deputy chairman); Nina Skero (CEO); Martin Piers (chairman)
- Website: cebr.com

The Centre for Economics and Business Research (Cebr) is an economic consultancy based in London, United Kingdom.

Cebr supplies economic forecasting and analysis to private firms and public bodies. It provides a range of economic services, including economic impact studies, macroeconomic forecasting, policy research, and general economic strategy and consultancy.

== History ==
Cebr was founded in 1992 by Douglas McWilliams, a former Chief Economic Adviser to the Confederation of British Industry and Chief Economist for IBM (UK), in the year that he won the Sunday Times Golden Guru Award for best United Kingdom economic forecaster. McWilliams was later the Gresham College professor of business.

== Structure ==
Cebr's Forecasting and Thought Leadership team delivers forecasts of the British and global economies and a range of economic tracker reports, such as the Irwin Mitchell UK Powerhouse Report, and the Asda Income Tracker.

The Economic Advisory team covers the areas of economic impact analysis, economic simulations, policy analysis, market sizing, and valuations. The team has advised a variety of industries, including tech, energy, maritime, financial services, international trade, manufacturing, engineering, and the arts.

The Environment, Infrastructure and Local Growth team has provided analysis for transport planning and other areas of policy and strategy, including digital connectivity, and housing.

== World Economic League Table ==
Since its first publication in 2009, Cebr's World Economic League Table (WELT) has provided a yearly measure of the comparative economic success of the countries of the world. Released once a year on Boxing Day (26 December), it receives global coverage.

In December 2020, Cebr predicted that China would overtake the United States as the world's biggest economy by 2028.

In December 2021, WELT 2022 saw the world's annual economic output exceeding $100 trillion for the first time during the year ahead.

In December 2022, the WELT report forecast a world recession in 2023. However, at the same time it predicted that India's annual growth trajectory would be 6.4% for five years ahead, then 6.5 per cent during the next nine years, taking India from fifth position in global rankings in 2022 to third position in 2037, after China and the United States.

In December 2022, Cebr also found that in 2022 China's economy had grown by only 3.2 per cent, well below the forecast figures, and attributed this to lockdowns in pursuit of China's Zero-COVID policy.

== News releases ==
In 2009, Cebr issued a news release which stated that "The UK's public sector productivity shortfall is costing taxpayers £58.4 billion a year – in other words, not far short of half our income tax is paying for public sector inefficiency."

In May of the same year, another news release from Cebr stated that since 2007 the number of millionaires in the United Kingdom had halved, falling from 489,000 to 242,000.

In September 2022, Cebr issued a statement critical of HM Treasury in the debate about Kwasi Kwarteng's package of tax cuts in his September mini-budget. This accused the Treasury of "gross exaggeration", particularly on the cost of not implementing a planned increase in United Kingdom corporation tax which would take it to "one of the highest levels in the western world".

== Notable people ==
- Douglas McWilliams, founder
- Vicky Pryce, Board member
- Danae Kyriakopoulou, managing economist, 2013–2016
