= Economic Statistics Centre of Excellence =

British economics research institute

- Abbreviation: ESCoE
- Formation: 2017; 9 years ago
- Founder: UK Office for National Statistics and UK Business Schools
- Type: Research institute
- Purpose: Fosters collaboration between statistics producers, academia, policymakers and other data users
- Location: London, United Kingdom
- Region served: United Kingdom
- Website: www.escoe.ac.uk

The Economic Statistics Centre of Excellence (ESCoE) brings a research-led approach to measuring the economy. Established in 2017 with the support of the UK Office for National Statistics (ONS) and hosted at King’s Business School, ESCoE is a hub of expertise, supporting and delivering cultural change in the delivery of economic statistics.

The Centre brings together statistics producers, academics, policymakers and data users to analyse key economic issues and develop cross-functional solutions.

To do this, ESCoE has a network of Research Associates, PhD students and partner organisations who use advanced tools from economic theory, econometrics and data science, mathematics and statistics to advance economic measurement.

== History ==
ESCoE was founded by a consortium of British university business schools, including Strathclyde Business School, with the ONS in 2017.

It was originally housed at the National Institute of Economic and Social Research and is now based at King's Business School in central London.

== Research programme ==
ESCoE’s research areas include: labour markets and households; National Accounts; net zero, climate change and the environment; productivity, innovation and business dynamics; and Beyond GDP and inclusive wealth. The Centre also works on the measurement of time use, and a historical data repository and runs conferences, webinars, and workshops to inspire knowledge sharing and collaboration.

== Leadership ==
ESCoE is led by Professor Rebecca Riley, and supported by Research and Enterprise Director Paul Schreyer, Operations Director Sarah Sheppard and Engagement Director Darren Morgan. ESCoE has a wider Leadership Executive representing key partner institutions and an Advisory Board drawn from government, the private sector, the media and international organisations.

== Partners ==
Partners include the ONS, King’s Business School, the Institute for Fiscal Studies, UNSW Sydney, and the universities of Cambridge and Strathclyde.

== See also ==
- Economic history of the United Kingdom
- UK Data Archive at the University of Essex
