= Danae Kyriakopoulou =

Greek economist

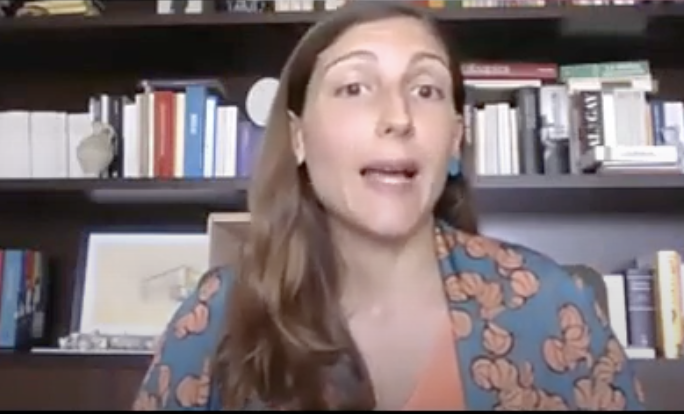
- Kyriakopoulou in 2021

Academic background
- Education: University of Oxford

Academic work
- Discipline: Economics
- Institutions: Official Monetary and Financial Institutions Forum

Danae Kyriakopoulou is a Greek economist who is currently the Official Monetary and Financial Institutions Forum (OMFIF)'s Chief Economist and Director of Research. Kyriakopoulou is the head of OMFIF's economic staff, providing leadership and direction in the economic research agenda. She is fluent in English, German, Greek, and Spanish. Kyriakopoulou is a macroeconomist who often is asked to speaker and contributor for international publications, conferences and the media.

== Biography ==
Danae Kyriakopoulou was raised in Athens, Greece and after went to the United Kingdom, where she earned her BA in Philosophy, Politics and Economics as well as an MSc in Economics for Development at the University of Oxford. Kyriakopoulou received two Principal's Collection Prize for two of her papers in Oxford; One was for her econometric paper and the second was for her microeconomics paper. She is fluent in English, German, Greek, and Spanish. Kyriakopoulou went on to work for the Bank of Greece in 2013 as an Economist. She moved back to the UK later in 2013 and got a position as a Senior Economist at the Centre for Economics and Business Research (CEBR), in London. From May to December 2015 Kyriakopoulou took a short position as a Senior Economic Adviser, at the Institute of Chartered Accountants in England and Wales, while still working at CEBR. Following her short position, Kyriakopoulou was promoted at CEBR, to managing economist. In 2016 Kyriakopoulou became the Chief Economist and Director of Research for OMFIF.

== Research ==
Danae Kyriakopoulou's research interests focus on macroeconomics, including the European economy, green finance, and development economics.

=== European economy ===
Danae Kyriakopoulou is a Greek economist based in London and has research and knowledge on the European Union, specifically the Eurozone. She has personal experience and insight on events such as Brexit and the Greek debt crisis. Kyriakopoulou research on her home country, the Greek debt crisis held no bias but viewed the events and the bailout in a critical manner. While Greece's third bailout had the country and the rest of Europe optimist Kyriakopoulou dives into deeper research of the economic reality surrounding Greece and the Eurozone. There is evidence of economic growth in Greece in 2017, with a decrease in the unemployment rate as well as the budget and account deficit. Kyriakopoulou states the problem is that the Greek economy had lost more than a quarter of its GDP over the decade long recession. With the European Union and the European Stability Mechanism, Greece will have a financial buffer for the next few years but what happens after? Kyriakopoulou analyses political environment and events; such as the United States' trade war with China and the 2019 European Parliament elections.

=== Green economy and green finance ===
Danae Kyriakopoulou has focused a lot on the research of green finance and the green economy. Climate change has become a growing political issue that Kyriakopoulou recognizes, affects everyone globally. The financial sector is also concerned with climate change and the risks that come with it. These risks and natural disasters devastate many people, damaging infrastructure and the economy; if it is insured this will result in higher claims which will ultimately fall on households. Kyriakopoulou suggests changes in climate policy, technology or investment must be the first step in reaching the global climate goal of keeping the rise in temperature to less than 2 degrees Celsius. Greening central banks and the financial system would be investing in green initiatives and technology. OMFIF along with organizations like the Bank for International Settlements, German finance ministry, DZ BANK, HSBC and other institutions created, 'Focus on green finance' initiative. 'Central Banks and Supervisors Network for Greening the Financial System' was created, focusing on central banks and IGOs. Kyriakopoulou has gathered research and evidence which she claims shows that central banks are moving past the analytical theory-based framework connected with climate change to their mandates and policy to these organizations stepping up and taking action.

== Media ==
Danae Kyriakopoulou is asked to speak and contribute to many various media sources, from news to journals and even her impactful Twitter presence. She has interviews on CNN and CNBC to name a few news sources that can be found on YouTube. She was on the 2016 'Business Insider's List of 36 best European Economist to follow on Twitter.'
