= Malcolm Pearson, Baron Pearson of Rannoch =

Former Leader of the UK Independence Party

The Right Honourable The Lord Pearson of Rannoch
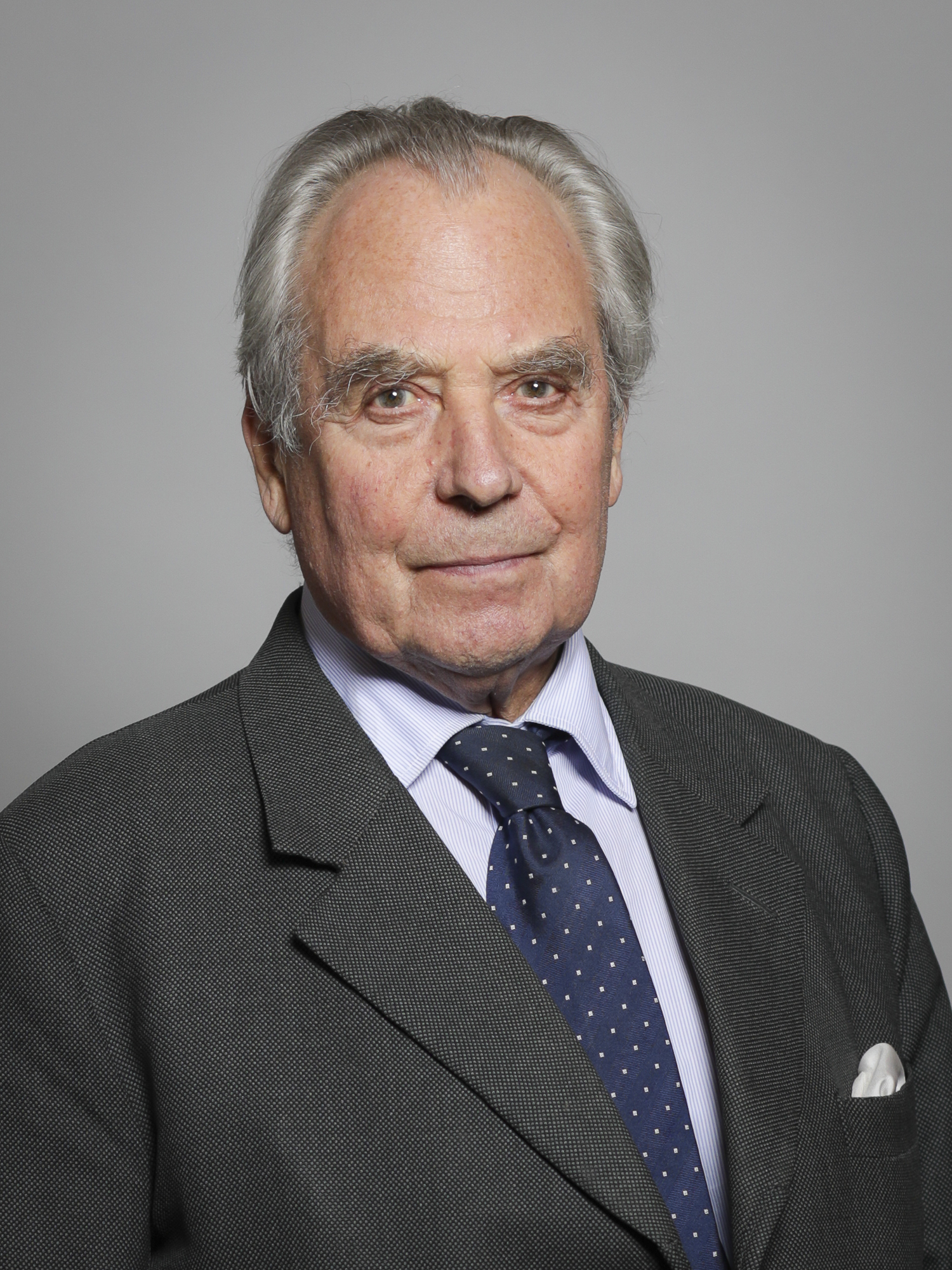
- Parliamentary portrait, 2019

Leader of the UK Independence Party
- In office 27 November 2009 – 2 September 2010
- Deputy: David Campbell Bannerman; The Viscount Monckton of Brenchley
- Preceded by: Nigel Farage
- Succeeded by: Jeffrey Titford (acting)

Member of the House of Lords
- Lord Temporal
- Life peerage 18 June 1990

Personal details
- Born: Malcolm Everard MacLaren Pearson; 20 July 1942 (age 84)
- Party: Independent (since 2019)
- Other political affiliations: UK Independence Party (2007–2019); Conservative (until 2007)
- Spouses: Francesca Frua de Angeli (m. 1965; div. 1970); Mary Charteris (m. 1977; div. 1996); Caroline St Vincent Rose (m. 1997)
- Children: 3

Malcolm Everard MacLaren Pearson, Baron Pearson of Rannoch in the Scottish district of Perth and Kinross (born 20 July 1942) is a British businessman and politician who was leader of the UK Independence Party (UKIP) from 2009 to 2010. He currently sits as an independent member of the House of Lords. A Eurosceptic, he was a staunch supporter of pro-Brexit campaign Leave Means Leave.

== Early life ==
Malcolm Everard MacLaren Pearson was born in 1942, the son of Colonel John MacLaren Pearson Pearson. He was educated at Eton.

== Early career ==
Prior to entering politics, Pearson had a career in international insurance. At the age of 22, in 1964 he founded the insurance brokers Pearson Webb Springbett.

During the Cold War, he was a leading critic of totalitarianism in the Soviet Union and supported Soviet dissidents. He worked closely with Russian author and dissident Aleksandr Solzhenitsyn to ensure that funds reached other artists and dissidents working inside the Soviet Union, and hosted Solzhenitsyn on his 8,000-hectare Rannoch Estate in Perthshire, Scotland. In 1984, Pearson established the Rannoch Charitable Trust, which funded many refugees escaping from the Soviet Union. In recognition of his efforts, Pearson was awarded in 2007 the Senator Henry "Scoop" Jackson Award For Values and Vision in Politics.

Pearson became treasurer of the degree-awarding body to the polytechnic sector, the Council for National Academic Awards, serving from 1983 to 1992.

Lord Pearson is a long-standing Member of the Advisory Board of the Global Panel Foundation - which works in conflict-areas around the world. He has strong links to the Prague Society for International Cooperation - which grew out of the anti-Communist dissident movement.

== Member of House of Lords ==
On the recommendation of Margaret Thatcher, Pearson was created a life peer on 18 June 1990 as Baron Pearson of Rannoch, of Bridge of Gaur in the District of Perth and Kinross, sitting as a Conservative. He entered the House for services to the insurance industry, particularly his anti-corruption stance on the Savonita affair. In February 1997, Hugo Gurdon published an interview in The Daily Telegraph with Pearson, discussing his metaphysical and political beliefs and motivations.

Pearson is a Eurosceptic of long standing. In May 2004, he called for voters to back the UK Independence Party (UKIP). Pearson criticised the Conservative Party's leadership for being "silly", and argued that they should try to get UKIP members back into the fold by adopting more eurosceptic policies themselves. Along with three other Conservative peers, he was then expelled by the Conservative Party on 30 May. He tabled a number of unsuccessful bills in the House of Lords demanding Britain's withdrawal from the European Union. In November 2006, he tabled the European Union (Implications of Withdrawal) Bill, which called for an official cost benefit analysis of UK's EU membership. He threatened to quit the Conservatives to join UKIP, which he did on 7 January 2007, along with Lord Willoughby de Broke, citing David Cameron's refusal to tell the British people about the disadvantages they suffer because of Britain's membership of the EU.

In October 2019, Pearson resigned from UKIP to sit as an independent.

=== 2009 row over expense account ===
Shortly after Pearson's election as UKIP leader in 2009, The Daily Telegraph reported that he had claimed more than £115,000 in Parliamentary expenses between 2001 and 2007, having designated his estate in Scotland as his main residence, although his £3.7m house in London was designated as his principal residence for tax purposes, and he was thus not liable for £275,000 in capital gains tax when he sold his London house in 2006.

In reply, Pearson argued that he spent "half the year" at his Scottish estate, stating that the sum covered several years in expenses and that working as a public servant had cost him "millions" as a result of having to give up salaried work.

=== Leader of UKIP (2009-2010) ===
In September 2009, Lord Pearson of Rannoch announced his candidacy in the 2009 UKIP leadership election. He won the election and was announced the new leader of UKIP on 27 November 2009. He led the party through the 2010 general election, appearing on BBC News' Campaign Show with Jon Sopel on 19 April 2010. During the interview, to talk about the party's recently launched manifesto, he appeared to have limited knowledge of what was in the manifesto, saying that he was not prepared to discuss the "minutiae" of his party's policies. He added, "I haven't remembered it all in great detail. I didn't come on to talk about this sort of thing."

Pearson resigned his leadership in August 2010, saying he was "not much good at party politics" and that UKIP "deserved a better politician to lead it". Michael White of The Guardian celebrated his resignation.

=== Criticisms of Islam ===
In 2009, Lord Pearson and cross-bencher Baroness Cox invited the Dutch Freedom Party leader, Geert Wilders, to show the anti-Islam film Fitna before the House of Lords. Jacqui Smith, then Home Secretary, subsequently excluded Wilders from entry to the UK. In response, Pearson and Cox accused the then Government of "appeasing" militant Islam. Wilders appealed successfully against his exclusion, and the film was eventually shown in the Lords in 2010.

Pearson warned in 2013 that UK Muslim communities were home to "thousands of potential home-grown terrorists". He said Sharia law was "running de facto in our land" and that calls for violence were not simply coming from a "few extremists", stating: "These people hate us with frightening religious fervour and we are right to fear them." His comments were condemned by Sayeeda Warsi, the Minister of State for Faith and Communities, who responded by stating: "It points at best to an ignorance about Islam and at worst a deliberate attempt to perpetuate a distorted image of the faith."

In 2014, Pearson suggested that the Quran had inspired the murder of Lee Rigby, referring to "the violence in the Qur'an – and indeed in the life and the example of Muhammad". Member of Parliament Yasmin Qureshi called Pearson's words "lies" and "nonsensical rubbish", while another MP, Khalid Mahmood, called them Islamophobic and said: "Obviously he hasn't read the Qur'an. Islam is about submission to the Almighty. It is not about war against anybody else."

Pearson invited Tommy Robinson to Parliament in 2018. A UKIP spokesperson said that Pearson had invited journalists to report on a question he asked in the House of Lords about grooming gangs and that Robinson was one of 160 people contacted by Pearson.

On 14 May 2019 he spoke to Baroness Cox's debate in the Lords "To ask Her Majesty's Government what progress has been made in the prevention of grooming gangs in Rotherham and elsewhere; and what assistance they have offered to victims and their families", during which he said:

I fear we must start by accepting the perpetrators are indeed radical Muslims.They should not be confused with other, decent men of Pakistani and Asian origin. Noble and Islamophiliac Lords may not like me saying that, but the excellent Quilliam Foundation found that it is true of 83% of the criminals concerned. If anyone is in any doubt, they should read Peter McLoughlin's 2016 masterpiece Easy Meat: Inside Britain’s Grooming Gang Scandal, which should be compulsory reading for the Government. I have mentioned before in your Lordships' House the tenets of abrogation, Taqiyya, Al Hijra, the lesser jihad and the pursuit of a world caliphate. However, there is another, which may lie at the root of the grooming gang scandal: namely, the radical Muslim tenet known as, 'what your right hand possesses'. I am advised that this allows Muhammad's followers to have sex slaves among their captives and among non-Muslim, or kuffar, girls. The trouble is that as soon as you start talking about radical Islam, you are immediately accused of Islamophobia, even if you can say what you like about any other religion. … If we turn a blind eye to the fact that the vast majority of grooming gang criminals are radical Muslims, we fuel the voices of extremism. That is exactly what is happening.

In 2023, it was revealed that Pearson and Baroness Cox were members of a secret group called the New Issues Group, which had been operating out of the House of Lords for over a decade and collaborated with far-right, anti-Muslim activists. Pearson has been described as a part of the counter-jihad movement.

== Personal life ==
Pearson has been married three times, first to Francesca Frua de Angeli in 1965, with whom he had one daughter, Silvia Lady Le Marchant (born 1966) and whom he divorced in 1970. Secondly to the Hon. Mary Charteris (daughter of the Baron Charteris of Amisfield) in 1977, with whom he had two daughters (Marina and Zara) and whom he divorced in 1996. Thirdly, he was married to Caroline St Vincent Rose in 1997.

Party political offices
Preceded by Nigel Farage	Leader of the UK Independence Party; 2009–2010	Succeeded by Jeffrey Titford
Orders of precedence in the United Kingdom
Preceded by The Lord Cavendish of Furness	Gentlemen; Baron Pearson of Rannoch	Followed by The Lord Sterling of Plaistow
