= Tim Congdon =

British economist

Timothy George Congdon
- Born: 28 April 1951 (age 74)

Timothy George Congdon CBE (born 28 April 1951) is a British economist.

== Early life ==
He was educated at Colchester Royal Grammar School and St. John's and Nuffield colleges at the University of Oxford.

== Career ==
Over the years, he has accumulated a long record of commenting on public policy issues, including writing sympathetically about (and deploying in his own analysis) the monetarist approach to macroeconomic policy. He has considerable experience working in the City of London and was the founder of the macroeconomic forecasting consultancy Lombard Street Research. Between 1993 and 1997 he was a member of the Treasury Panel that advised the Conservative government on economic policy, sometimes referred to as the "wise men".

Since May 2008, he has been the economic correspondent for Standpoint magazine. He set up the economic advisory group International Monetary Research Ltd. in 2009; it applies Congdon's monetarist approach.

In January 2011 Congdon became the Honorary Chairman of The Freedom Association. He is on the Advisory Council of the Reform think tank. He was made a Fellow of the Royal Economic Society in May 2025.

== Northern Rock bail-out ==
Congdon was a prominent defender of the UK Government's action to lend to Northern Rock, arguing that it was quite likely to make money for the government. He is a small shareholder in Northern Rock, a fact that he has disclosed publicly after writing on this issue.

== Politics ==
Congdon stood as UK Independence Party candidate for the Forest of Dean constituency in the 2010 General Election, obtaining 5.2% of the votes cast and saving his deposit. In October 2010 he stood unsuccessfully for the leadership of the party. In 2015 he was replaced as the UKIP candidate for Forest of Dean by Steve Stanbury. Congdon supported Britain's exit from the European Union in the UK's 2016 EU referendum.

== Books ==
- Basic Economics: A Dictionary of Terms, Concepts, and Ideas (London: Arrow Books, 1976, with Douglas McWilliams) ISBN 978-0099130208
- The Quantity Theory of Money: A New Restatement (London: Institute of Economic Affairs, 2024) ISBN 978-0255368421
