= Barbara Gibson =

American-born British politician and academic

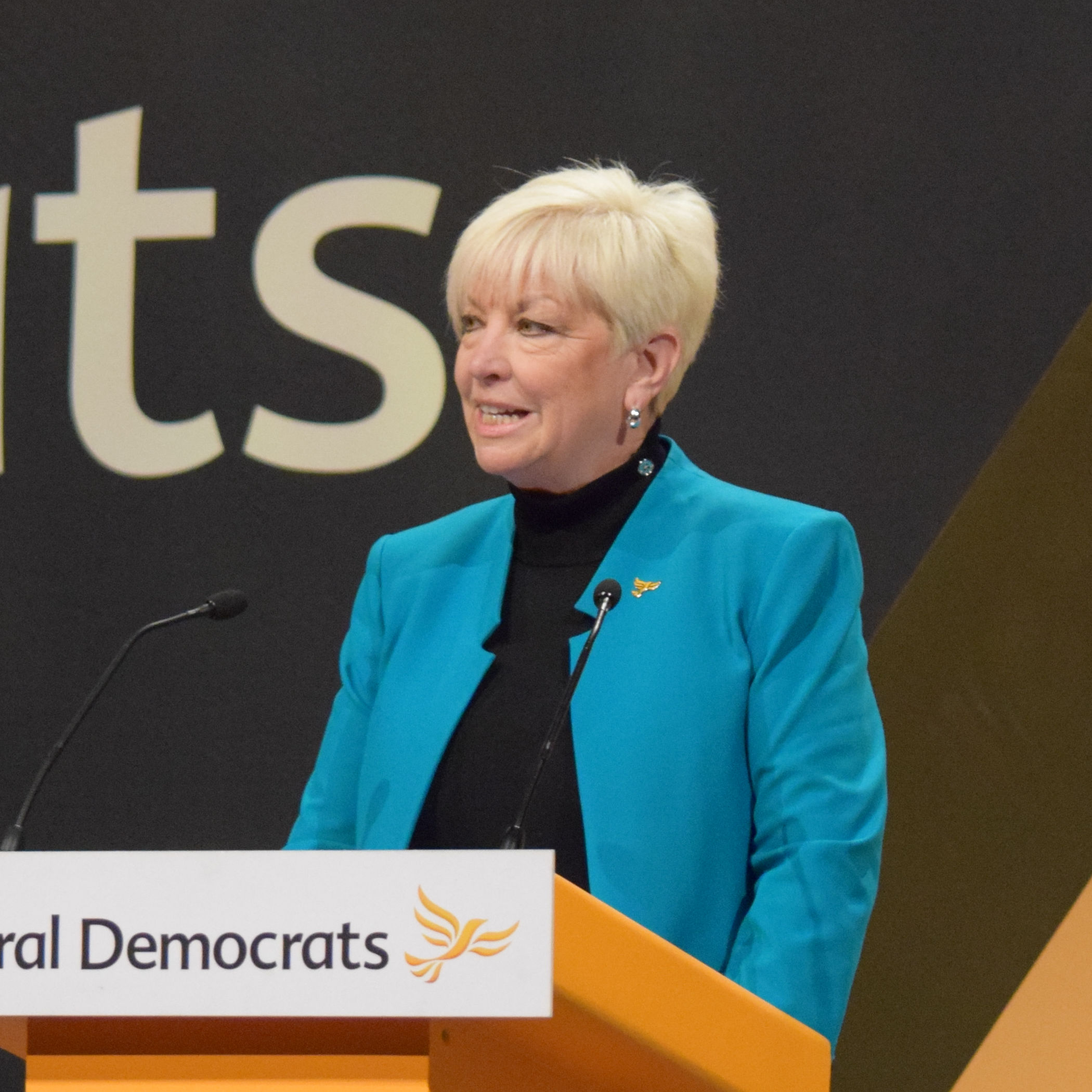
- Barbara Gibson at the Liberal Democrats Spring Conference 2019 in March 2019

Member of the European Parliament for East of England
- In office 2 July 2019 – 31 January 2020
- Preceded by: John Flack
- Succeeded by: Constituency abolished

Hertfordshire County Councillor for Haldens
- In office 4 May 2017 – 6 May 2021
- Preceded by: Sara Johnstone
- Succeeded by: Sunny Thusu

Personal details
- Born: 25 August 1962 (age 64) Oklahoma City, Oklahoma, United States
- Party: Liberal Democrats
- Education: Birkbeck, University of London

Barbara Ann Gibson (born 25 August 1962) is an American-born British politician and academic. Gibson was a Liberal Democrat Member of the European Parliament (MEP) for the East of England between 2019 and the United Kingdom's withdrawal from the EU.

== Early life ==
Gibson was born in Oklahoma City in 1962 and moved to the United Kingdom in 2002.

Gibson earned a PhD in Intercultural Communication and has lectured on this topic in the context of global business for universities and business schools in the UK and across Europe, including Birkbeck, University of London.

== Political career ==
Gibson was elected to Hertfordshire County Council in 2017, winning her seat from the Conservatives who had held it since 2009.

Gibson was elected to the European Parliament at the 2019 European Parliamentary election. She was placed first on the party list in the East of England constituency, and was elected alongside Lucy Nethsingha, who was placed second.

She was a member of the Committee on International Trade where she played a key role in deciding whether the EU should lower tariffs or harmonise regulations between countries outside of the EU. Gibson was also a member of the Delegation to the ACP-EU Joint Parliamentary Assembly as well a Substitute on three other EU Parliamentary bodies: the Committee on Employment and Social Affairs, the Committee on Regional Development and the Delegation for relations with the countries of Southeast Asia and the Association of Southeast Asian Nations (ASEAN).

With more than 25 years’ experience as a business communication professional, Gibson has worked with companies across the world; is a past international chair of the International Association of Business Communicators (IABC); past-president of SIETAR UK (the Society for Intercultural Education, Training and Research); and a past International Group Chair of the CIPR (Chartered Institute of Public Relations).

Having come third in Stevenage at the 2017 general election, she was expected to stand as the Liberal Democrat candidate in Welwyn Hatfield in 2019 but did not.

== Personal life ==
Prior to Brexit, Gibson lived in Welwyn, Hertfordshire. Following the failure of the fight to stop the UK’s withdrawal from the European Union, she moved to Italy and is now a permanent resident there.

== Electoral history ==
General election 2017: Stevenage
Party	Candidate	Votes	%	±%
Conservative	Stephen McPartland	24,798	50.3	▲5.7
Labour Co-op	Sharon Taylor	21,414	43.4	▲9.2
Liberal Democrats	Barbara Gibson	2,032	4.1	▲0.8
Green	Victoria Snelling	1,085	2.2	▼0.7
Majority		3,384	6.9	▼3.5
Turnout		49,329	69.7	▲2.0
Conservative hold		Swing	▼1.8	

=== 2019 European Parliament election ===
European election 2019: East of England (results)
List	Candidates	Votes	Of total (%)	± from prev.
Brexit Party	Richard Tice (1) Michael Heaver (3) June Mummery (5) Paul Hearn, Priscilla Huby, Sean Lever, Edmund Fordham	604,715 (201,391.67)	37.83	N/A
Liberal Democrats	Barbara Gibson (2) Lucy Nethsingha (6) Fionna Tod, Stephen Robinson, Sandy Walkington, Marie Goldman, Jules Ewart	361,563 (180,751.5)	22.62	15.72
Green	Catherine Rowett (4) Rupert Read, Martin Schmierer, Fiona Radic, Paul Jeater, Pallavi Devulapalli, Jeremy Caddick	202,460	12.67	4.17
Conservative	Geoffrey Van Orden (7) John Flack, Joe Rich, Thomas McLaren, Joel Charles, Wazz Mughal, Thomas Smith	163,830	10.25	−18.15
Labour	Alex Mayer, Chris Vince, Sharon Taylor, Alvin Shum, Anna Smith, Adam Scott, Javeria Hussain	139,490	8.73	−8.57
Change UK	Emma Taylor, Neil Carmichael, Bhavna Joshi, Michelle de Vries, Amanda Gummer, Thomas Graham, Roger Casale	58,274	3.65	N/A
UKIP	Stuart Agnew, Paul Oakley, Elizabeth Jones, William Ashpole, Alan Graves, John Wallace, John Whitby	54,676	3.42	−31.08
English Democrat	Robin Tilbrook, Charles Vickers, Bridget Vickers, Paul Wiffen	10,217	0.64	−1.09
Independent	Attila Csordas	3,230	0.20	N/A
Rejected ballots		9,589		
Turnout		1,603,017	36.37%	+0.4%
