= List of members of the European Parliament for the United Kingdom (2004–2009) =

This is a list of members of the European Parliament for the United Kingdom in the 2004 to 2009 session, ordered by name.

See 2004 European Parliament election in the United Kingdom for a list ordered by constituency.

== Members ==
This table can be sorted by constituency, party or party group: click the symbol at the top of the appropriate column.

Name	National party	EP Group	Constituency
Jim Allister	Traditional Unionist Voice (until 27 March 2007) Independent (until 17 December 2007) Traditional Unionist	NI	Northern Ireland
Richard Ashworth	Conservative Party	EPP–ED	South East England
Robert Atkins	Conservative Party	EPP–ED	North West England
Elspeth Attwooll	Liberal Democrats	ALDE	Scotland
Gerard Batten	UK Independence Party	IND&DEM	London
Christopher Beazley	Conservative Party	EPP–ED	East of England
Godfrey Bloom	UK Independence Party	IND&DEM	Yorkshire and the Humber
John Bowis	Conservative Party	EPP–ED	London
Chris Huhne (until 10 May 2005) Sharon Bowles (from 12 May 2005)	Liberal Democrats	ALDE	South East England
Philip Bradbourn	Conservative Party	EPP–ED	West Midlands
Philip Bushill-Matthews	Conservative Party	EPP–ED	West Midlands
Martin Callanan	Conservative Party	EPP–ED	North East England
Michael Cashman	Labour Party	PES	West Midlands
Giles Chichester	Conservative Party	EPP–ED	South West England
Derek Clark	UK Independence Party	IND&DEM	East Midlands
Graham Booth (until 30 September 2008) Trevor Colman (from 1 October 2008)	UK Independence Party	IND&DEM	South West England
Richard Corbett	Labour Party	PES	Yorkshire and the Humber
Chris Davies	Liberal Democrats	ALDE	North West England
Bairbre de Brún	Sinn Féin	EUL–NGL	Northern Ireland
Nirj Deva	Conservative Party	EPP–ED	South East England
Den Dover	Conservative Party	EPP–ED	North West England
Andrew Duff	Liberal Democrats	ALDE	East of England
James Elles	Conservative Party	EPP–ED	South East England
Jillian Evans	Plaid Cymru	G–EFA	Wales
Jonathan Evans	Conservative Party	EPP–ED	Wales
Robert Evans	Labour Party	PES	London
Nigel Farage	UK Independence Party	IND&DEM	South East England
Glyn Ford	Labour Party	PES	South West England
Neena Gill	Labour Party	PES	West Midlands
Fiona Hall	Liberal Democrats	ALDE	North East England
Daniel Hannan	Conservative Party	EPP–ED (until 19 February 2008) NI	South East England
Malcolm Harbour	Conservative Party	EPP–ED	West Midlands
Chris Heaton-Harris	Conservative Party	EPP–ED	East Midlands
Roger Helmer	Conservative Party	EPP–ED (until 7 June 2005) NI	East Midlands
Mary Honeyball	Labour Party	PES	London
Richard Howitt	Labour Party	PES	East of England
Ian Hudghton	Scottish National Party	G–EFA	Scotland
Stephen Hughes	Labour Party	PES	North East England
Caroline Jackson	Conservative Party	EPP–ED	South West England
Theresa Villiers (until 10 May 2005) Syed Kamall (from 12 May 2005)	Conservative Party	EPP–ED	London
Saj Karim	Liberal Democrats (until 9 January 2008) Conservative Party	ALDE (until 11 December 2007) EPP–ED	North West England
Robert Kilroy-Silk	UK Independence Party	IND&DEM (until 1 November 2004) NI	East Midlands
Glenys Kinnock	Labour Party	PES	Wales
Timothy Kirkhope	Conservative Party	EPP–ED	Yorkshire and the Humber
Roger Knapman	UK Independence Party	IND&DEM (until 4 June 2008) NI	South West England
Jean Lambert	Green Party (England and Wales)	G–EFA	London
Caroline Lucas	Green Party (England and Wales)	G–EFA	South East England
Sarah Ludford	Liberal Democrats	ALDE	London
Liz Lynne	Liberal Democrats	ALDE	West Midlands
David Martin	Labour Party	PES	Scotland
Linda McAvan	Labour Party	PES	Yorkshire and the Humber
Arlene McCarthy	Labour Party	PES	North West England
Edward McMillan-Scott	Conservative Party	EPP–ED	Yorkshire and the Humber
Claude Moraes	Labour Party	PES	London
Eluned Morgan	Labour Party	PES	Wales
Ashley Mote	UK Independence Party (until 1 February 2005) Independent	NI (until 14 January 2007) ITS (until 13 November 2007) NI	South East England
Mike Nattrass	UK Independence Party	IND&DEM	West Midlands
Bill Newton Dunn	Liberal Democrats	ALDE	East Midlands
Emma Nicholson	Liberal Democrats	ALDE	South East England
Jim Nicholson	Ulster Unionist Party	EPP–ED	Northern Ireland
Neil Parish	Conservative Party	EPP–ED	South West England
John Purvis	Conservative Party	EPP–ED	Scotland
Terry Wynn (until 27 August 2006) Brian Simpson (from 28 August 2006)	Labour Party	PES	North West England
Peter Skinner	Labour Party	PES	South East England
Alyn Smith	Scottish National Party	G–EFA	Scotland
Struan Stevenson	Conservative Party	EPP–ED	Scotland
Catherine Stihler	Labour Party	PES	Scotland
Robert Sturdy	Conservative Party	EPP–ED	East of England
David Sumberg	Conservative Party	EPP–ED	North West England
Charles Tannock	Conservative Party	EPP–ED	London
Jeffrey Titford	UK Independence Party	IND&DEM	East of England
Gary Titley	Labour Party	PES	North West England
Geoffrey van Orden	Conservative Party	EPP–ED	East of England
Diana Wallis	Liberal Democrats	ALDE	Yorkshire and the Humber
Graham Watson	Liberal Democrats	ALDE	South West England
John Whittaker	UK Independence Party	IND&DEM	North West England
Phillip Whitehead (until 31 December 2005) Glenis Willmott (from 1 January 2006)	Labour Party	PES	East Midlands
Tom Wise	UK Independence Party	IND&DEM (until 7 May 2008) NI	East of England

== Changes ==
Name	Region	Party	Date	Reason for departure
Chris Huhne	South East England	LibDem	11 May 2005	Resigned on election to the House of Commons
Theresa Villiers	London	Conservative	11 May 2005	Resigned on election to the House of Commons
Phillip Whitehead	East Midlands	Labour	31 December 2005	Deceased
Terry Wynn	North West England	Labour	27 August 2006	Resigned after reaching 60th birthday
Graham Booth	South West England	UKIP	1 October 2008	Retired
