= List of members of the European Parliament for the United Kingdom (2009–2014) =

This is a list of members of the European Parliament for the United Kingdom in the 2009 to 2014 session, ordered by name.

See 2009 European Parliament election in the United Kingdom for further information on these elections in the UK, and 2009 European Parliament election for discussion on likely changes to the Parliamentary Groups.

== Current members ==
Name	Constituency	National Party	EP Group
Stuart Agnew	East of England	UK Independence Party	EFD
Bairbre de Brún (until 2 May 2012) Martina Anderson (from 12 June 2012)	Northern Ireland	Sinn Féin	EUL-NGL
Marta Andreasen	South East England	UK Independence Party (until 25 February 2013)	EFD (until 26 February 2013) ECR
Richard Ashworth	South East England	Conservative Party	ECR
Robert Atkins	North West England	Conservative Party	ECR
Gerard Batten	London	UK Independence Party	EFD
Catherine Bearder	South East England	Liberal Democrats	ALDE
Liz Lynne (until 3 February 2012) Phil Bennion (from 6 February 2012)	West Midlands	Liberal Democrats	ALDE
Godfrey Bloom	Yorkshire and the Humber	UK Independence Party	EFD (until 8 January 2014) NI
Sharon Bowles	South East England	Liberal Democrats	ALDE
Philip Bradbourn	West Midlands	Conservative Party	ECR
Andrew Brons	Yorkshire and the Humber	British National Party (until 16 October 2012) Independent (until 8 February 2013) British Democratic Party	NI
John Bufton	Wales	UK Independence Party	EFD
Martin Callanan	North East England	Conservative Party	ECR
David Campbell Bannerman	East of England	UK Independence Party (until 10 July 2011) Conservative Party	EFD (until 23 May 2011) ECR
Michael Cashman	West Midlands	Labour Party	PASD
Giles Chichester	South West England	Conservative Party	ECR
Derek Clark	East Midlands	UK Independence Party	EFD
Trevor Colman	South West England	UK Independence Party	EFD (until 24 March 2011) NI
The Earl of Dartmouth	South West England	UK Independence Party	EFD
Chris Davies	North West England	Liberal Democrats	ALDE
Nirj Deva	South East England	Conservative Party	ECR
Diane Dodds	Northern Ireland	Democratic Unionist Party	NI
Andrew Duff	East of England	Liberal Democrats	ALDE
James Elles	South East England	Conservative Party	ECR
Jill Evans	Wales	Plaid Cymru	Greens–EFA
Nigel Farage	South East England	UK Independence Party	EFD
Vicky Ford	East of England	Conservative Party	ECR
Jacqueline Foster	North West England	Conservative Party	ECR
Ashley Fox	South West England	Conservative Party	ECR
Julie Girling	South West England	Conservative Party	ECR
Nick Griffin	North West England	British National Party	NI
Fiona Hall	North East England	Liberal Democrats	ALDE
Daniel Hannan	South East England	Conservative Party	ECR
Malcolm Harbour	West Midlands	Conservative Party	ECR
Roger Helmer	East Midlands	Conservative Party (until 17 June 2012) UK Independence Party	ECR (until 4 March 2012) EFD
Mary Honeyball	London	Labour Party	PASD
Richard Howitt	East of England	Labour Party	PASD
Ian Hudghton	Scotland	Scottish National Party	Greens–EFA
Stephen Hughes	North East England	Labour Party	PASD
Syed Kamall	London	Conservative Party	ECR
Saj Karim	North West England	Conservative Party	ECR
Timothy Kirkhope	Yorkshire and the Humber	Conservative Party	ECR
Jean Lambert	London	Green Party (England and Wales)	Greens–EFA
Sarah Ludford	London	Liberal Democrats	ALDE
George Lyon	Scotland	Liberal Democrats	ALDE
David Martin	Scotland	Labour Party	PASD
Linda McAvan	Yorkshire and the Humber	Labour Party	PASD
Arlene McCarthy	North West England	Labour Party	PASD
Emma McClarkin	East Midlands	Conservative Party	ECR
Edward McMillan-Scott	Yorkshire and the Humber	Conservative Party (until 11 March 2010) Liberal Democrats	ECR (until 19 July 2009) NI (until 11 May 2010) ALDE
Anthea McIntyre	West Midlands	Conservative Party	ECR
Claude Moraes	London	Labour Party	PASD
Mike Nattrass	West Midlands	UK Independence Party (until 3 November 2013) An Independence Party (until 24 March 2014) An Independence from Europe	EFD (until 22 June 2010) NI (until 10 December 2012) EFD (until 8 September 2013) NI
Bill Newton Dunn	East Midlands	Liberal Democrats	ALDE
Jim Nicholson	Northern Ireland	Ulster Conservatives and Unionists - New Force	ECR
Paul Nuttall	North West England	UK Independence Party	EFD
Brian Simpson	North West England	Labour Party	PASD
Nikki Sinclaire	West Midlands	UK Independence Party (until 15 February 2011) Independent (until 12 September 2012) We Demand a Referendum	EFD (until 17 January 2010) NI
Peter Skinner	South East England	Labour Party	PASD
Alyn Smith	Scotland	Scottish National Party	Greens–EFA
Struan Stevenson	Scotland	Conservative Party	ECR
Catherine Stihler	Scotland	Labour Party	PASD
Robert Sturdy	East of England	Conservative Party	ECR
Kay Swinburne	Wales	Conservative Party	ECR
Charles Tannock	London	Conservative Party	ECR
Caroline Lucas (until 7 May 2010) Keith Taylor (from 2 June 2010)	South East England	Green Party (England and Wales)	Greens–EFA
Diana Wallis (until 31 January 2012) Rebecca Taylor (from 8 March 2012)	Yorkshire and the Humber	Liberal Democrats	ALDE
Geoffrey Van Orden	East of England	Conservative Party	ECR
Derek Vaughan	Wales	Labour Party	PASD
Graham Watson	South West England	Liberal Democrats	ALDE
Glenis Willmott	East Midlands	Labour Party	PASD
Marina Yannakoudakis	London	Conservative Party	ECR

== Former members ==
Name	Region	Party	Date	Reason for departure
Caroline Lucas	South East England	Green Party (England and Wales)	17 May 2010	Resigned on election to the House of Commons
Diana Wallis	Yorkshire and the Humber	Liberal Democrats	31 January 2012	Retired
Liz Lynne	West Midlands	Liberal Democrats	3 February 2012	Retired
Bairbre de Brún	Northern Ireland	Sinn Féin	3 May 2012	Retired
