= List of members of the European Parliament for the United Kingdom (1999–2004) =

This is a list of members of the European Parliament for the United Kingdom in the 1999 to 2004 session, ordered by name.

For a list ordered by constituency, see Members of the European Parliament for the United Kingdom 1999–2004 by region.

== List ==
Name	National party	EP Group	Constituency
Gordon Adam	Labour Party	PES	North East England
Robert Atkins	Conservative Party	EPP–ED	North West England
Elspeth Attwooll	Liberal Democrats	ELDR	Scotland
Richard Balfe	Conservative Party	PES / EPP–ED	London
Christopher Beazley	Conservative Party	EPP–ED	East of England
The Lord Bethell	Conservative Party	EPP–ED	
Graham Booth	UK Independence Party	EDD	
David Bowe	Labour Party	PES	
John Bowis	Conservative Party	EPP–ED	
Philip Charles Bradbourn	Conservative Party	EPP–ED	
Philip Bushill-Matthews	Conservative Party	EPP–ED	
Martin Callanan	Conservative Party	EPP–ED	
Michael Cashman	Labour Party	PES	
Giles Chichester	Conservative Party	EPP–ED	
Nicholas Clegg	Liberal Democrats	ELDR	
Richard Corbett	Labour Party	PES	
John Corrie	Conservative Party	EPP–ED	
Chris Davies	Liberal Democrats	ELDR	
Nirj Deva	Conservative Party	EPP–ED	
Alan Donnelly	Labour Party	PES	
Den Dover	Conservative Party	EPP–ED	
Andrew Duff	Liberal Democrats	ELDR	
James Elles	Conservative Party	EPP–ED	
Jill Evans	Plaid Cymru	G–EFA	
Jonathan Evans	Conservative Party	EPP–ED	
Robert Evans	Labour Party	PES	
Nigel Farage	UK Independence Party	EDD	
Glyn Ford	Labour Party	PES	
Jacqueline Foster	Conservative Party	EPP–ED	
Neena Gill	Labour Party	PES	
Robert Goodwill	Conservative Party	EPP–ED	
Pauline Green	Labour Party	PES	
Daniel Hannan	Conservative Party	EPP–ED	
Malcolm Harbour	Conservative Party	EPP–ED	
Christopher Heaton-Harris	Conservative Party	EPP–ED	
Roger Helmer	Conservative Party	EPP–ED	
Michael Holmes	UK Independence Party	EDD / NI	
Mary Honeyball	Labour Party	PES	
Richard Howitt	Labour Party	PES	
Ian Hudghton	Scottish National Party	G–EFA	
Stephen Hughes	Labour Party	PES	
Christopher Huhne	Liberal Democrats	ELDR	
John Hume	Social Democratic and Labour Party	PES	Northern Ireland
The Lord Inglewood	Conservative Party	EPP–ED	
Caroline Jackson	Conservative Party	EPP–ED	
Bashir Khanbhai	Conservative Party	EPP–ED	
Glenys Kinnock	Labour Party	PES	
Timothy Kirkhope	Conservative Party	EPP–ED	
Jean Lambert	Green Party (England and Wales)	G–EFA	
Caroline Lucas	Green Party (England and Wales)	G–EFA	
Sarah Ludford	Liberal Democrats	ELDR	
Elizabeth Lynne	Liberal Democrats	ELDR	
The Earl of Stockton	Conservative Party	EPP–ED	
Linda McAvan	Labour Party	PES	
Arlene McCarthy	Labour Party	PES	
Neil MacCormick	Scottish National Party	G–EFA	
Edward McMillan-Scott	Conservative Party	EPP–ED	
Eryl McNally	Labour Party	PES	
David Martin	Labour Party	PES	
Bill Miller	Labour Party	PES	
Claude Moraes	Labour Party	PES	
Eluned Morgan	Labour Party	PES	
Simon Murphy	Labour Party	PES	
Bill Newton Dunn	Liberal Democrats	EPP–ED (1999–2000) / ELDR	
Jim Nicholson	Ulster Unionist Party	EPP–ED	Northern Ireland
Baroness Nicholson of Winterbourne	Liberal Democrats	ELDR	
Mo O'Toole	Labour Party	PES	
Ian Paisley	Democratic Unionist Party	NI	Northern Ireland
Neil Parish	Conservative Party	EPP–ED	
Roy Perry	Conservative Party	EPP–ED	
James Provan	Conservative Party	EPP–ED	
John Purvis	Conservative Party	EPP–ED	
Mel Read	Labour Party	PES	
Brian Simpson	Labour Party	PES	
Peter Skinner	Labour Party	PES	
Struan Stevenson	Conservative Party	EPP–ED	
Catherine (Taylor-)Stihler	Labour Party	PES	
Robert Sturdy	Conservative Party	EPP–ED	
David Sumberg	Conservative Party	EPP–ED	
Charles Tannock	Conservative Party	EPP–ED	
Jeffrey Titford	UK Independence Party	EDD	
Gary Titley	Labour Party	PES	
Ian Twinn	Conservative Party	EPP–ED	
Geoffrey Van Orden	Conservative Party	EPP–ED	
Theresa Villiers	Conservative Party	EPP–ED	
Diana Wallis	Liberal Democrats	ELDR	
Graham Watson	Liberal Democrats	ELDR	
Mark Watts	Labour Party	PES	
Phillip Whitehead	Labour Party	PES	
Eurig Wyn	Plaid Cymru	G–EFA	
Terence Wynn	Labour Party	PES	

== See also ==
- Members of the European Parliament 1999–2004
- List of members of the European Parliament, 1999–2004 - for a full alphabetical list
- 1999 European Parliament election in the United Kingdom
