= Lists of members of the European Parliament for the United Kingdom =

There are separate lists of members of the European Parliament for the United Kingdom for each term:

- Delegation (1973)
- 1st term (1979)
- 2nd term (1984)
- 3rd term (1989)
- 4th term (1994)
- 5th term (1999)
- 6th term (2004)
- 7th term (2009)
- 8th term (2014)
- 9th term (2019)

There is also a list of female members of the European Parliament for the United Kingdom.
