= Patrick O'Flynn =

English journalist and politician (1965–2025)

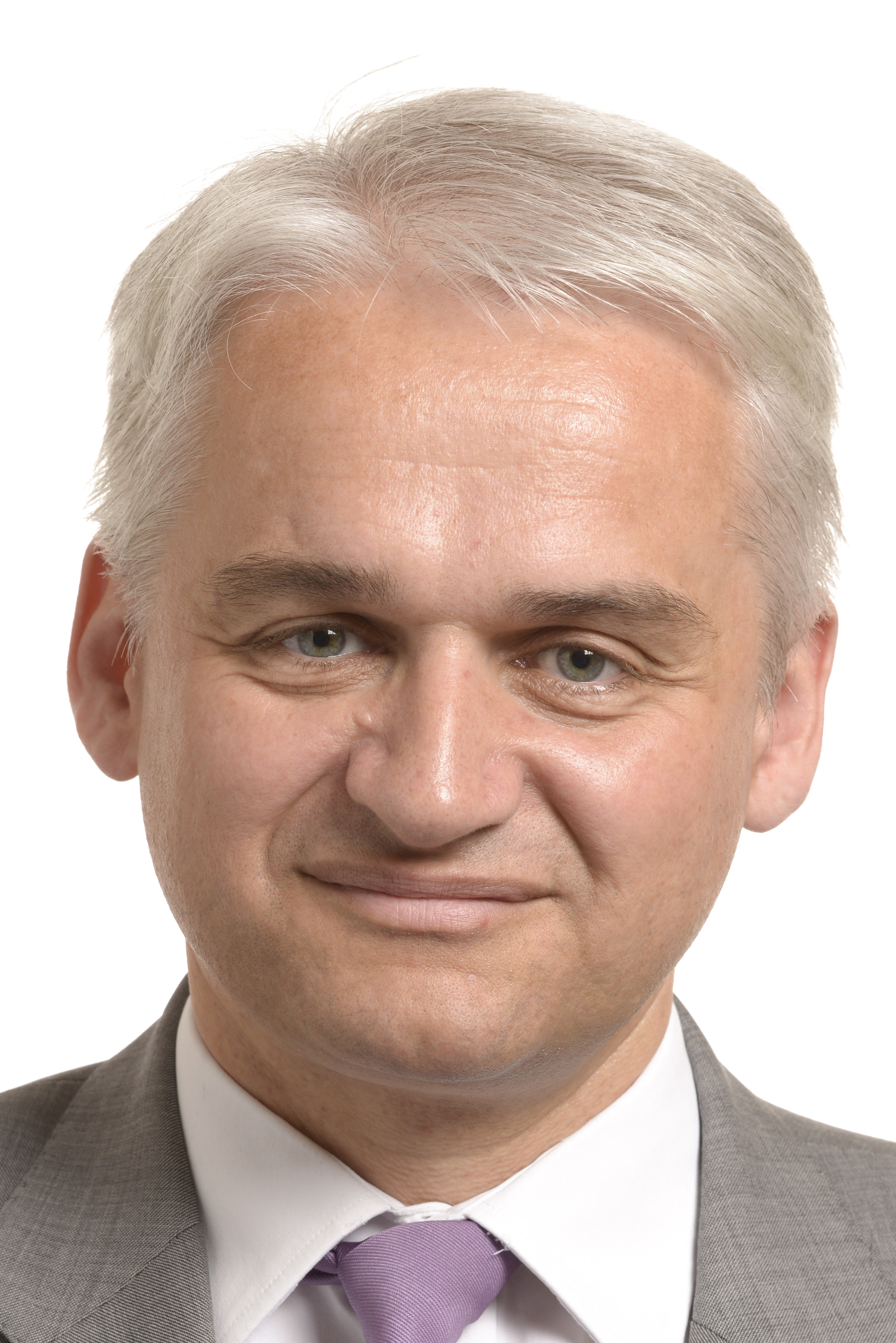
- O'Flynn in 2014

Member of the European Parliament for the East of England
- In office 1 July 2014 – 1 July 2019
- Preceded by: Robert Sturdy
- Succeeded by: Richard Tice

Personal details
- Born: Patrick James O'Flynn; 29 August 1965 Cambridge, England
- Died: 20 May 2025 (aged 59) London, England
- Party: UKIP (before 2018); SDP (2018–2025)
- Education: King's College, Cambridge; City, University of London
Other UKIP offices
UKIP Media and Sport Spokesperson
In office 1 December 2016 – 27 July 2017
Leader	Paul Nuttall
Preceded by	position established
Succeeded by	~
Special Political Advisor for the Leader of the UK Independence Party
In office 28 November 2016 – 27 July 2017
Leader	Paul Nuttall
Preceded by	Office established
Succeeded by	Jonathan Arnott
UKIP Economics Spokesman
In office 7 April 2017 – 27 July 2017
Leader	Paul Nuttall
Preceded by	Mark Reckless
In office 24 July 2014 – 18 August 2015
Leader	Nigel Farage
Preceded by	Steven Woolfe
Succeeded by	Mark Reckless

Patrick James O'Flynn (29 August 1965 – 20 May 2025) was an English journalist and politician who served as Member of the European Parliament (MEP) for the East of England from 2014 to 2019. He was elected for the UK Independence Party (UKIP) but defected to the Social Democratic Party in November 2018. He was previously political editor at the Daily Express.

== Early life and journalism ==
O'Flynn read economics at King's College, Cambridge, graduating in 1987. He subsequently received a diploma in journalism from City, University of London. He then worked as chief political commentator and then political editor at the Daily Express.

From 2019, O'Flynn frequently wrote for The Spectator.

== Political career ==
O'Flynn was the UK Independence Party spokesperson on the economy until 19 May 2015.

He was the UKIP candidate in Cambridge at the general election in 2015 and came fifth, with 5.2 per cent of the vote. Afterwards he described UKIP leader Nigel Farage as "snarling, thin-skinned and aggressive".

O'Flynn was the running-mate for Lisa Duffy in the September 2016 UK Independence Party leadership election. He left the UKIP frontbench in July 2017, believing that the party no longer supported his centrist economic policies. He joined the Social Democratic Party in November 2018. He cited UKIP leader Gerard Batten's appointment of Tommy Robinson (Stephen Yaxley-Lennon) as an adviser as a key reason for his departure from the party. He said of his decision to join the SDP: "like many on the communitarian wing of [UKIP], I have decided to join the resurgent SDP, which campaigned for Brexit during the referendum and espouses broad and moderate pro-nation state political values that I – and I believe many of our voters from 2014 – will be delighted to endorse." In defecting, O'Flynn became the first MEP to sit in the European Parliament for the SDP (though in 1984 Michael Gallagher MEP had joined the original SDP).

O'Flynn stood as the SDP candidate in the 2019 Peterborough by-election, but received only 135 votes (0.4 per cent), and lost to Lisa Forbes. O'Flynn narrowly avoided a repeat of the 1990 Bootle by-election result by beating the Monster Raving Loony Party candidate, who polled 112.

In April 2021, O'Flynn started the Snap, a podcast with Michael Heaver.

== Personal life and death ==
O'Flynn and his wife, Carole Ann, who was a life coach and also a Daily Express writer, had a son and a daughter.

Shortly after being diagnosed with liver cancer, he died in London on 20 May 2025, at the age of 59.

Party political offices
Preceded by Steven Woolfe	UKIP Economics Spokesperson; 2014–2015	Succeeded by Mark Reckless
Preceded by Mark Reckless	UKIP Economics Spokesperson; 2017	Succeeded by Unknown
New post	Special Political Advisor for the Leader of the UK Independence Party; 2016–2017	Succeeded by Jonathan Arnott
Preceded by Paul Nuttall	UKIP Media and Sports Spokesperson; 2016–2017	Succeeded by Unknown
European Parliament
Preceded by Robert Sturdy	Member of the European Parliament for the East of England; 2014–2019	Succeeded by Richard Tice
