= Catherine Rowett =

Philosophy professor and politician (born 1956)

Cllr Catherine Rowett
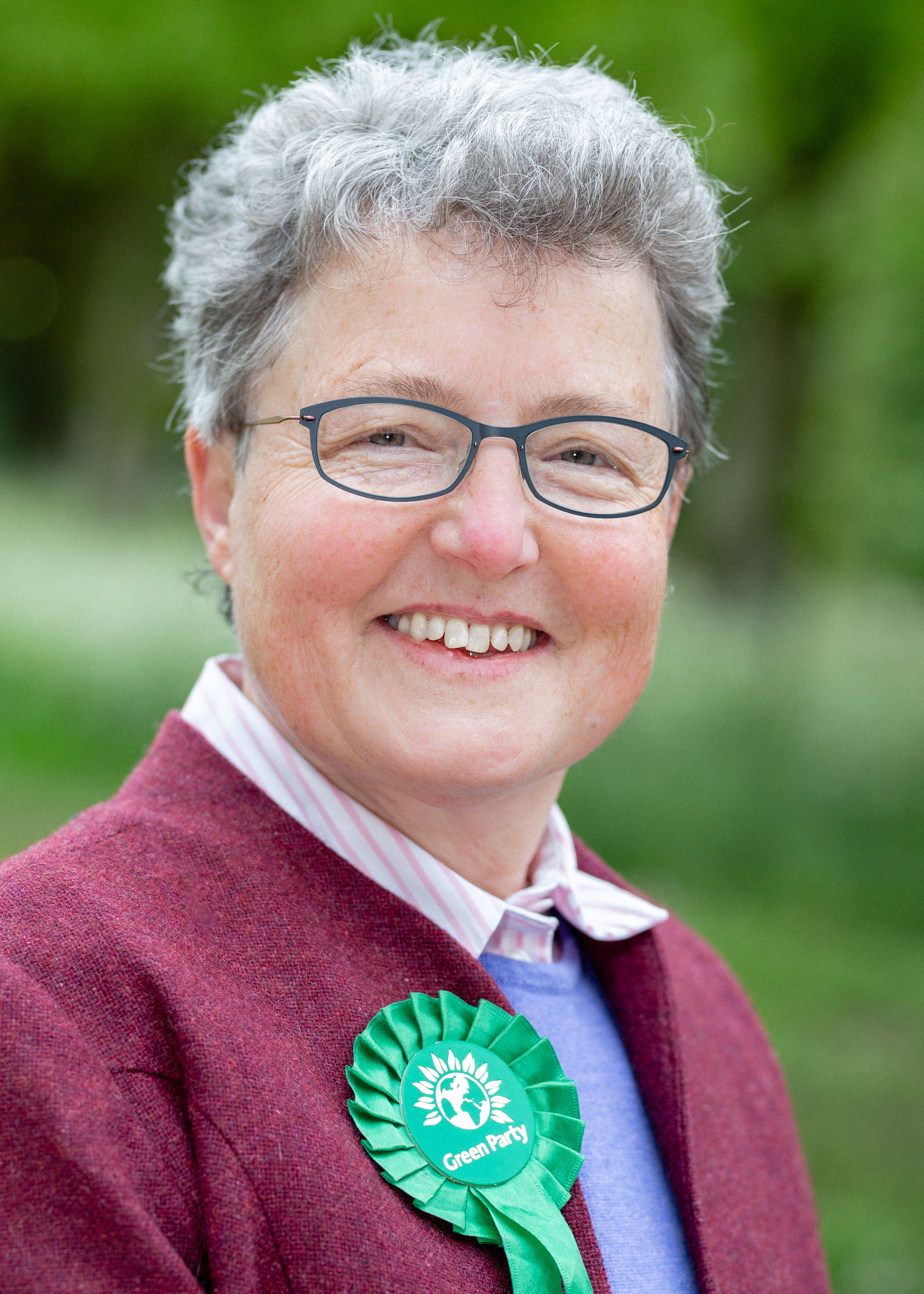
- Catherine Rowett, Cambridge, 2019

Norfolk County Councillor for West Depwade division
- In office 13 July 2023 – 7 May 2026
- Preceded by: Barry Duffin
- Succeeded by: Margaret Thomas

Member of the European Parliament for East of England
- In office 2 July 2019 – 31 January 2020
- Preceded by: Alex Mayer
- Succeeded by: Constituency abolished

Personal details
- Born: 29 December 1956 (age 69) Yeovil, Somerset, England
- Party: Green Party of England and Wales
- Education: King's College, Cambridge
- Website: catherinerowett.org

Academic background
- Doctoral advisor: Christopher Stead

Academic work
- Discipline: Philosophy
- Institutions: New Hall, Cambridge; St Anne's College, Oxford; Swansea University; University of Liverpool; University of East Anglia
- Notable works: Rethinking Early Greek Philosophy: Hippolytus of Rome and the Presocratics; Knowledge and Truth in Plato: Stepping Past the Shadow of Socrates

Catherine Joanna Rowett (born 29 December 1956, previously publishing as Catherine Osborne from 1979 to 2011) is a British academic and former Member of the European Parliament representing the Green Party of England and Wales. She is Professor Emerita of Philosophy at the University of East Anglia. She is known in particular for her work on Greek Philosophy, especially the Pre-Socratic philosophers. She was a Green Party Member of the European Parliament (MEP) for the East of England from 2019 until 31 January 2020, when the United Kingdom left the European Union.

== Academic career ==
Rowett read Classics at the King's College, Cambridge, where she was also awarded her PhD with a dissertation on Hippolytus of Rome and Pre-Socratic philosophers. The dissertation was published as Rethinking Early Greek Philosophy: Hippolytus of Rome and the Presocratics by Cornell University Press in 1987.

Rowett became a Junior Research Fellow of New Hall, Cambridge in 1984. In 1987, she took up a Senior Research Fellowship at St Anne's College, Oxford while also a British Academy Postdoctoral Fellow. From 1990 Rowett was a lecturer in philosophy at Swansea University. On leaving Swansea in 2000, Rowett became Reader in Greek Culture at the University of Liverpool and then 2003 she moved to the University of East Anglia as a lecturer in philosophy. Rowett became Reader in 2006, Professor of Philosophy in 2008 and Professor Emerita in 2023. She was the Head of the School of Philosophy (later incorporated into the current School of Politics, Philosophy, Language and Communication Studies) from 2005 to 2008. During her time as an MEP she was on unpaid leave from her University duties.

Rowett was awarded a Leverhulme Trust Research Fellowship from 2007 to 2009 for her work on knowledge and truth in Plato, which formed the foundation of her work published as Knowledge and Truth in Plato: Stepping Past the Shadow of Socrates by Oxford University Press in 2018.

== Political career ==
Rowett stood as a Green Party candidate for the constituency of South Norfolk in the 2015 and 2017 general elections.

She was selected as the lead Green Party candidate for the East of England in the 2019 European Parliament election and was elected with her Green Party list receiving 12.7% of the votes cast. The party topped the poll in Norwich with 26% of the votes cast in the city. Her seat was dissolved on 31 January 2020, following the United Kingdom's exit from the European Union.

On 13 July 2023, Rowett was elected as a Green Party councillor on Norfolk County Council when she won the West Depwade by-election. From 2024 to 2026 she was leader of the Green Group. She stood down as councillor in May 2026.

== Personal life ==
From 1979 to 2014 she was married to Robin Osborne and together they have two daughters.

== Selected publications ==
=== As Catherine Rowett ===
- Knowledge and Truth in Plato: Stepping Past the Shadow of Socrates (Oxford University Press, 2018)

=== As Catherine Osborne ===
- Philoponus: On Aristotle Physics 1.4-9 (Ancient Commentators on Aristotle, Duckworth, 2009)
- Dumb beasts and Dead Philosophers: Humanity and the Humane in Ancient Philosophy and Literature (Oxford University Press, 2007)
- Philoponus Commentary on Aristotle's Physics book 1.1-3 (Ancient Commentators on Aristotle, Duckworth, 2006)
- Presocratic Philosophy: a very Short Introduction (Oxford University Press, 2004)
- Eros Unveiled: Plato and the God of Love (Clarendon Press, 1994)
- Rethinking Early Greek Philosophy: Hippolytus of Rome and the Presocratics (Cornell University Press, 1987)

See also Catherine Rowett on Researchgate
