= June Mummery =

British politician (born 1963/1964)

Councillor June Mummery
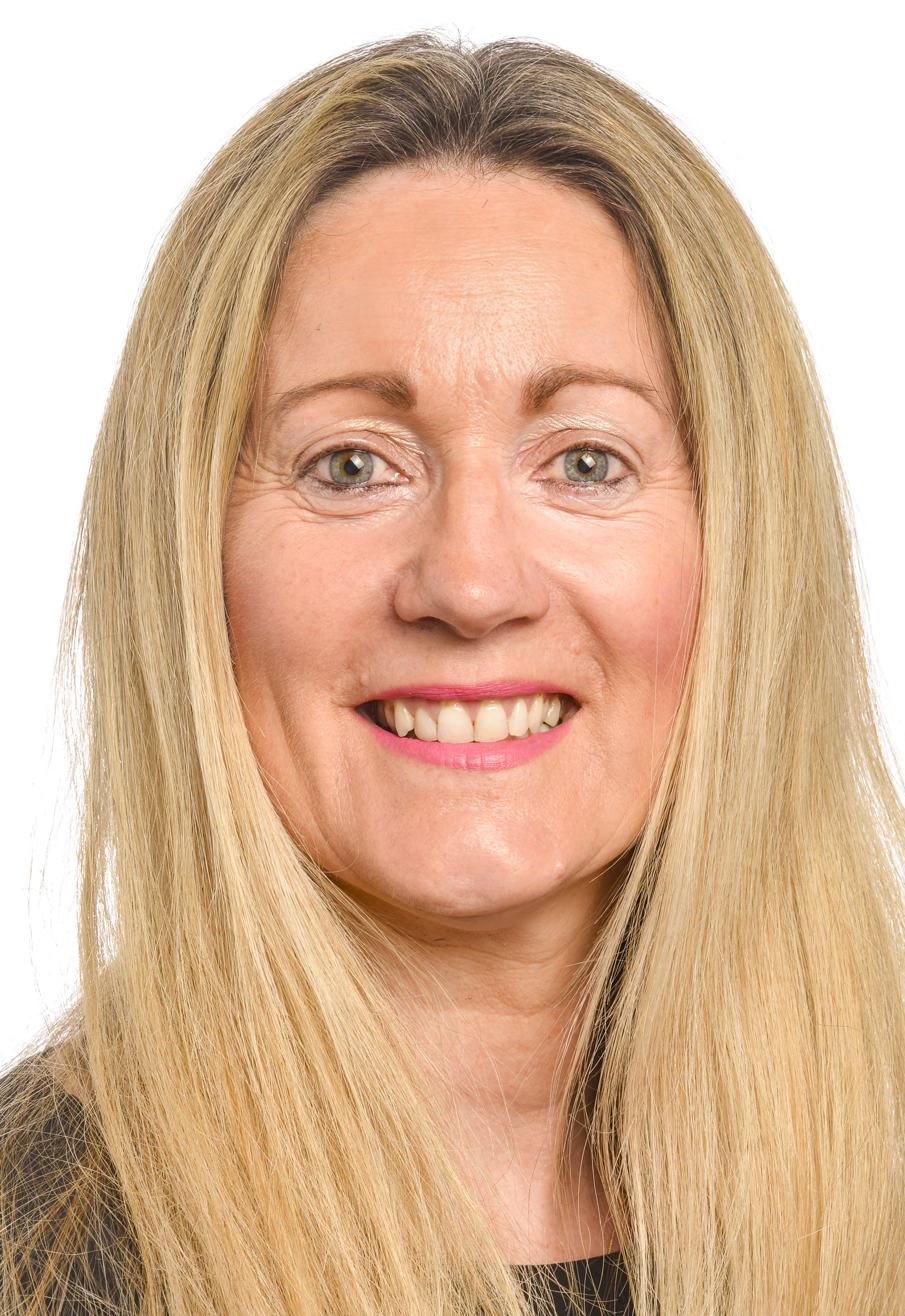
- Official portrait, 2019

Member of Suffolk County Council for Pakefield
- Incumbent
- Assumed office 19 December 2025
- Preceded by: Melanie Vigo di Gallidoro

Member of the European Parliament for East of England
- In office 2 July 2019 – 31 January 2020
- Preceded by: Tim Aker
- Succeeded by: Constituency abolished

Personal details
- Born: January 1964 (age 62)
- Party: Reform UK
- Occupation: Politician, businesswoman

June Alison Mummery (born January 1964) is a British politician, and businesswoman, who has been Reform UK's Fisheries spokesperson since 2023. Since 19 December 2025, she has been a councillor for the Pakefield division of Suffolk County Council.

She was elected as a Brexit Party Member of the European Parliament (MEP) for the East of England constituency in the 2019 European parliamentary election, a role she held until the United Kingdom's withdrawal from the EU. Mummery is also the managing director of BFP Eastern Ltd, fish market auctioneers who operate in Lowestoft.

== Fishing industry ==
Mummery is a member of the Lowestoft Fish Market Alliance (fishermen group), and is the managing director of BFP Eastern Ltd (fish market auctioneers). She bought the latter company in 2004, which also operates Lowestoft's fish market. Mummery is a founder of Renaissance of East Anglian Fisheries (REAF), a partnership between the East Anglia fishing industry and local councils. She has campaigned with the pro-Brexit group Fishing for Leave. Before her involvement in the fishing industry, she was a sales director in the engineering sector. In January 2021, she complained that the EU–UK Trade and Cooperation Agreement had left her company with no fish and that it was on its knees.

== Political career ==
Mummery voted for Brexit in the 2016 United Kingdom European Union membership referendum. She supports Brexit as she thought that it will allow the United Kingdom to have far greater control of fishing in its waters despite having to relinquish fishing rights in foreign waters, and therefore provide an economic benefit.

She stood as a candidate for the Brexit Party in the East of England constituency in the 2019 European parliamentary election. She was third on her party's list, and was elected as one of its three MEPs in the constituency. In the European Parliament, she was a member of the Committee on Transport and Tourism, and was part of the delegation for relations with the countries of South Asia.

Mummery was the Reform UK candidate for Lowestoft in 2024 United Kingdom general election. She came 3rd, with 24.7% of the vote.

On 19 December 2025, she stood in the Suffolk County Council Pakefield division by-election in December 2025 and was elected, making her the fifth Reform UK councillor in the council.
