= John Flack (British politician) =

British Conservative politician

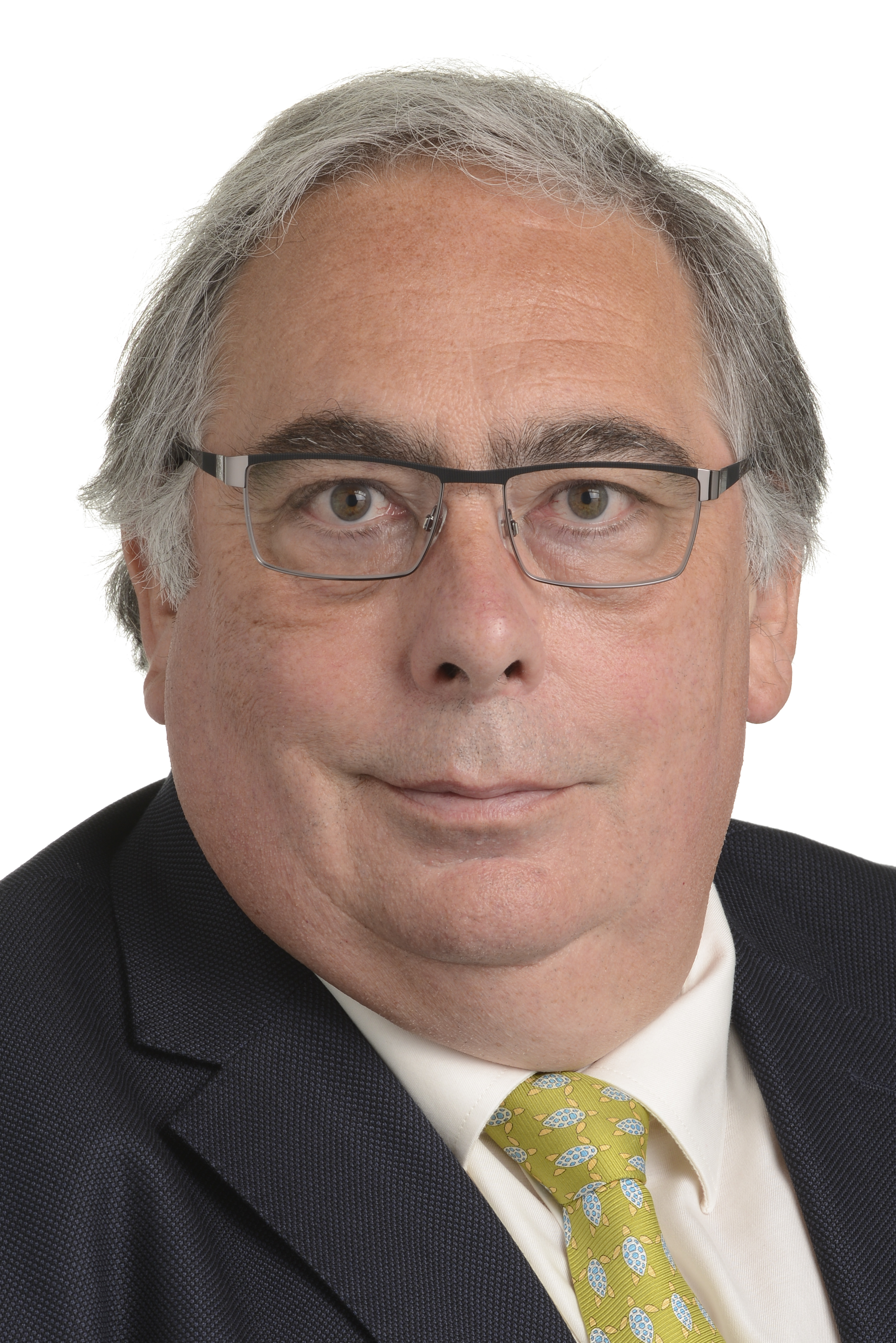

Member of the European Parliament for East of England
- In office 28 June 2017 – 1 July 2019
- Preceded by: Vicky Ford
- Succeeded by: Richard Tice

Personal details
- Born: 3 January 1957 (age 69) Romford, Essex, United Kingdom
- Party: Conservative

John Flack (born 3 January 1957) is a British Conservative Party politician. He was a Member of the European Parliament (MEP) for the East of England, having lost his seat to the Brexit Party in the 2019 EU Election. He is a supporter of Eurosceptic pressure group Leave Means Leave.

== Life and career ==
Flack attended Abbs Cross High School in Hornchurch. He rose from trainee to junior partner of a firm of chartered surveyors, before directing various property companies.

He also served as a magistrate, initially the youngest in Essex when appointed in 1988. He served for 21 years before transferring to the supplemental list in 2009, in order that he could stand for the European Parliament and to avoid any perception of conflict of interest.

== Political career ==
Flack campaigned to end animal testing

Flack contested the European Parliament constituency of Northumbria in the 1994 election and London in the 1999 election. He contested Enfield Southgate in the 2001 general election, coming second to the Labour incumbent Stephen Twigg almost quadrupling the Labour majority in 1997.

He was 4th on the Conservative list for the East of England region in the European Parliament elections in 2009 and 2014, but only 3 Conservatives were elected on each occasion. He took his seat in 2017 after fellow MEP Vicky Ford was elected as an MP in the general election.

Flack sat on the European Parliament's Committee on Regional Development (REGI). He served as the Regional Development Spokesman for the Conservative Party. He was also a substitute member of the Parliament's Committee on Fisheries (PECH).

Flack is an active animal welfare campaigner, and has co-hosted a roundtable event on fur labelling problems in the EU market. He was voted as a Vice President of the European Parliament's Animal Welfare Intergroup. In 2019 he was appointed as a Patron of the Conservative Animal Welfare Foundation in acknowledgement of his commitment to animal welfare reform.
