= Tom Wise (politician) =

British politician (born 1948)

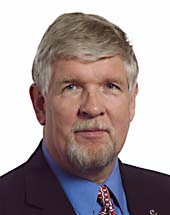

Member of the European Parliament for East of England
- In office 10 June 2004 – 4 June 2009
- Preceded by: Bashir Khanbhai
- Succeeded by: David Campbell Bannerman

Personal details
- Born: 13 May 1948 (age 78) Bournemouth, Hampshire, England
- Party: Independent
- Other political affiliations: UK Independence Party (until 2009)
- Education: Bournemouth School

Thomas Harold Wise (born 13 May 1948) is a former Independent and UKIP Member of the European Parliament (MEP) for the East of England. A former police officer, he was elected in 2004 as a member of the UK Independence Party but later had the whip suspended when allegations of misuse of parliamentary expenses surfaced in The Sunday Telegraph. Following an inquiry carried out by the European Anti-Fraud Office, Wise was formally charged with false accounting and money laundering by Bedfordshire Police. After initially pleading not guilty, he admitted the charges and was sentenced in November 2009 at Southwark Crown Court to a two-year term of imprisonment. He is thought to be the first MEP to be jailed for expenses fraud. Sentencing him, the judge said that Wise had engaged in "deliberate and blatant dishonesty" and had set about to defraud the European Parliament almost as soon as he was elected.

== Early career ==
Born in Bournemouth, Wise attended Bournemouth School between 1959 and 1965, before completing a Diploma in Public Speaking in 1967. He served with Dorset Police before embarking on a career in the food distribution and processing industry. He became the UK managing director of a German herbs and spices company. From 1981 to 1989 he was a member of the Liberal Party.

== Political career ==
=== UKIP ===
Wise joined the United Kingdom Independence Party (UKIP) in 1997. He served as office manager to Jeffrey Titford MEP, during this period he worked on the rules governing MEPs' expenses and gained an expertise in the system which he would later use to his advantage. He was the fourth-placed candidate on UKIP's candidate list in for the European Parliament elections in 1999, and also stood as the party's candidate in the 1997, 2001 and 2005 general elections for the South West Bedfordshire constituency. In the 2005 general election, he came fourth with 4.2% of the votes cast.

He was elected as an MEP for UKIP in the 2004 European elections. He was UKIP's official spokesman on the Culture, Youth, Media and Sport Committee until his suspension by the party in February 2007. In his first speech to the Committee on 4 October 2004, Wise criticised the proposed budget and drew allusions with Nazi Propaganda Minister Joseph Goebbels. In his maiden speech to the Parliament on 16 December 2004, Wise blamed the European Union for creating unacceptable conditions for the transit of animals around Europe. Wise also spoke out against the Proposed directive on the patentability of computer-implemented inventions

=== Independent ===
After losing the party whip in March 2007, Wise continued as an Independent within UKIP's Independence/Democracy parliamentary grouping pending the outcome of the fraud inquiry.

During his time as an MEP, Wise disputed the genuine nature of the September 11th attacks. and labelled Russia-based businessman Alisher Usmanov, who is a shareholder of Arsenal F.C. a "gangster and racketeer"

Following the decision to press criminal charges against him, Wise decided not to contest the 2009 European Parliament elections. He did however say that he wanted to stand as an MP in the 2010 General Election.

== Fraud conviction ==
=== Exposure ===
On 23 October 2005, a reporter for the Sunday Telegraph, Daniel Foggo, published an article accusing Wise of claiming £36,000 a year from the European Parliament in the name of his researcher, Lindsay Jenkins, while only passing on about a sixth of that amount to her. According to now-repealed rules governing the payment of expenses and allowances to Members of the European Parliament, MEPs could claim up to £125,000 per year for assistants' wages, but this money must be paid either directly to the employees or to a third-party agent. The rules did not allow the funds to pass directly through the hands of MEPs themselves.

Foggo later reported that Wise had supplied the European Parliament's Payments Office with a "contract" including her name and details, which stipulated that the £36,000 allowance should be paid into an account named "Stags". This account, held with the Co-operative Bank, was in fact Wise's own business account and its full name was "T Wise trading as Stags". The actual agreement between Wise and Jenkins stated that she would receive monthly "retainer" payments of £500 for advice and statistical research, with any extra work to be paid on top. Bank documents obtained by Foggo showed that between November 2004 and October 2005, Wise had paid £39,100 to this account, out of which Jenkins received £13,555. These funds were the only monies coming into the account. In another breach of the payment regulations, some of the £13,555 paid to Jenkins represented work done on behalf of other UKIP members, including party leader Nigel Farage who had agreed to fund the publication of a eurosceptic pamphlet by Jenkins. A further £19,000 was transferred from the account, some of which to pay off credit cards.

On 29 October, Wise admitted to breaching the rules and, to head off a scandal, agreed to repay £25,230. An internal UKIP inquiry was launched after the Parliament became aware of the affair, but no action was taken and the results of the investigation were kept secret. As Daniel Foggo later reported, UKIP's former leader, Roger Knapman, halted the inquiry after it uncovered serious wrongdoing, believing that the European Parliament would clear Wise. Farage told reporter Daniel Foggo that Wise "had committed a simple, silly error by making himself a "paying agent" for his own staff."

=== Suspension from UKIP ===
On 23 February 2007, party sources at UKIP discovered that the European Parliament had passed the affair to OLAF, the European Anti-Fraud Office. A UKIP meeting was convened in Brussels on 28 February 2007 at which Wise formally admitted to having spent £6,500 from the allowance on a dark green Peugeot 406 which he still drove, but refused to disclose how he had spent a further £13,000 of the funds. After a heated discussion, a decision was taken to remove the whip; both Knapman and fellow MEP Mike Nattrass challenged the decision and threatened to reconsider their futures in the party. Farage emphasised that, if cleared by the OLAF investigation, Wise would be welcomed back into the party, adding that he thought "there is a great deal of public sympathy for us." Wise was however suspended by the party.

Following his suspension, Wise spent a further £8,000 of the allowance in legal fees in contemplation of a libel case against Greg Lance-Watkins who had published claims on the Internet relating to Wise's activities. No action was ultimately brought against Lance-Watkins.

=== Arrest and charges ===
On 20 June 2008, Wise was arrested by Bedfordshire Police's Economic Crime Unit on suspicion of making a false instrument, obtaining money by deception by transfer and converting criminal property. He was bailed until 29 October. Bedfordshire Police made the arrest after having been contacted by OLAF.

On 20 April 2009 the Crown Prosecution Service advised Bedfordshire Police to charge both Wise and Jenkins with one count each of false accounting contrary to the Theft Act 1968 and one count each of money laundering contrary to the Proceeds of Crime Act 2002. Both were scheduled to appear before the City of Westminster Magistrates' Court in April 2009 to face the charges. Wise indicated that he was innocent and would fight the charges which carry a maximum 14-year jail term. He is thought to be the first MEP to face criminal charges over the misuse of parliamentary funds, and the second former UKIP MEP after Ashley Mote to have faced criminal charges during a parliamentary session.

=== Trial and conviction ===
Wise appeared in court on 27 April 2009 and spoke only to confirm his name and plead not guilty. Jenkins also denied the charges. District Judge Daphne Wickham released both on conditional bail until 8 June. The case was transferred to Southwark Crown Court and charges specified: that Wise and Jenkins "falsified a document, namely a contract for provision of services, an application for secretarial assistance allowance and invoices". Also, that they used funds "received from the European Parliament intended for use as payments for secretarial services."

The three-week trial began on 2 November 2009. Judge Geoffrey Rivlin QC heard the prosecution argue that Wise channelled parliamentary funds into an account he secretly controlled so that he could pay credit card debts and buy fine wines. He made separate payments of £2,228 and £1,260 to wine importers, and maintained the deception by asking Jenkins to sign blank documents which he completed later. But for his exposure, Wise would, according to prosecutors, have claimed up to £180,000.

On the third day of the trial, just before Nigel Farage was due to give evidence against him, Wise began several hours of negotiations with his legal team after which he changed his plea to guilty and said he was entirely to blame for the fraud. This resulted in Jenkins being acquitted. He was sentenced on 10 November 2009 to two years imprisonment, the sentence having been reduced by one year on account of his guilty plea. In sentencing him, Judge Geoffrey Rivlin declared that:

It is no exaggeration to say that you had hardly got your feet beneath your desk as an MEP before you were planning to defraud the parliament to which you were elected and the people you were elected to serve. This was very deliberate and blatant dishonesty. You did not fall into this offence as a result of some unfortunate combination of unforeseen circumstances which happened to suddenly present you with temptation. You knew the system of expenses inside out and this was a claim you devised and planned with some care.

The judge added that, in addition to jail, Wise would also have to pay £30,000 towards the prosecution's costs.

== Personal life ==
Wise is married to Janet and, until his imprisonment, lived in Linslade near Leighton Buzzard in Bedfordshire. He has two adult children.

Wise has a developed interest in wines, having followed courses arranged by the Wine & Spirit Education Trust and has reached "the level just below Master of Wine".
