= Alex Mayer =

British politician (born 1981)

Alex Mayer MP
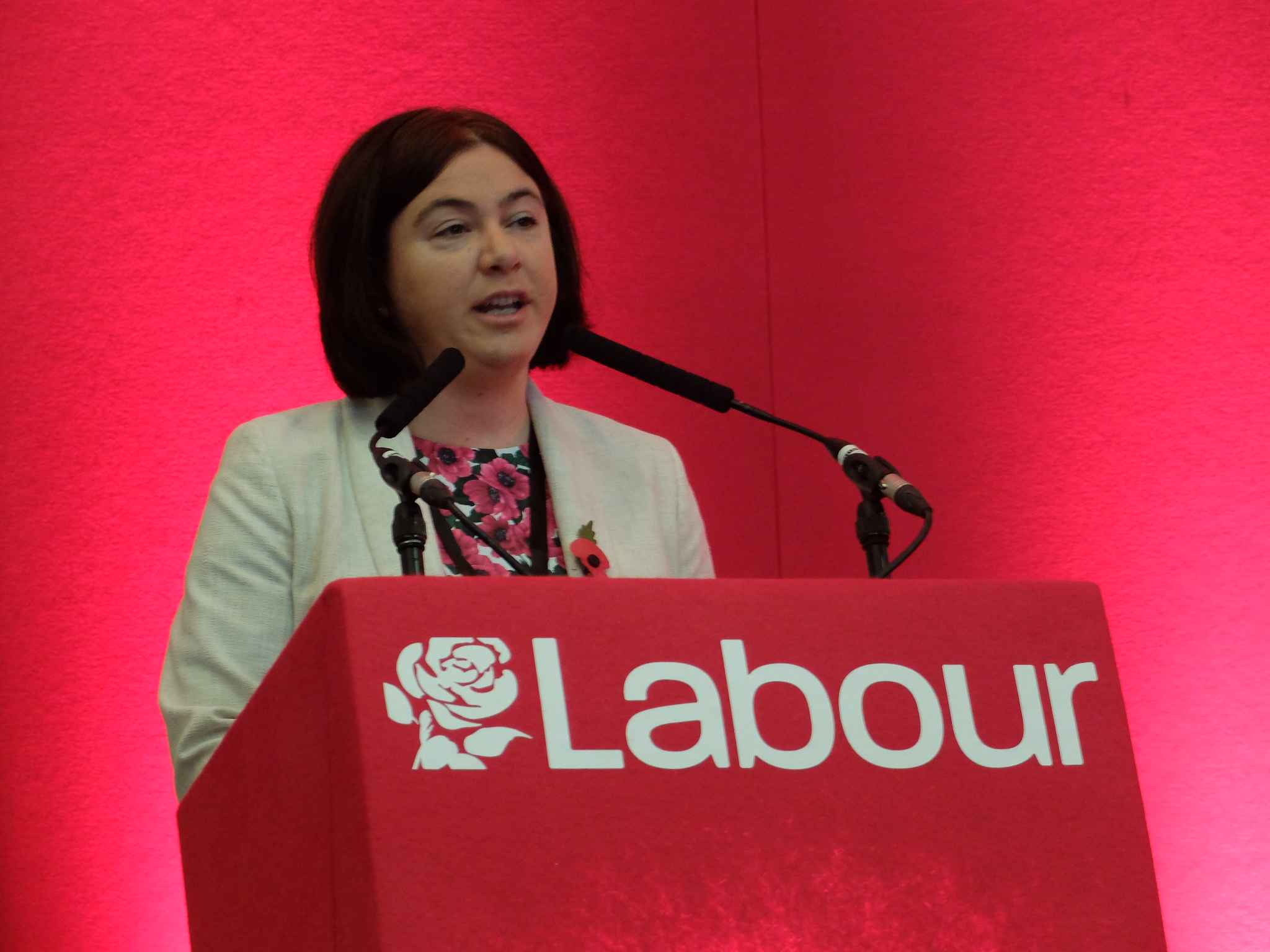

Member of Parliament for Dunstable and Leighton Buzzard
- Incumbent
- Assumed office 4 July 2024
- Preceded by: Constituency established
- Majority: 667 (1.4%)

Member of the European Parliament for East of England
- In office 15 November 2016 – 1 July 2019
- Preceded by: Richard Howitt
- Succeeded by: Catherine Rowett

Personal details
- Born: Alexandra Louise Mayer; 2 June 1981 (age 45) High Wycombe, Buckinghamshire, England
- Party: Labour
- Website: alexmayer.co.uk

Alexandra Louise Mayer (born 2 June 1981) is a British Labour Party politician who has served as the Member of Parliament (MP) for Dunstable and Leighton Buzzard since 2024. She was previously a Member of the European Parliament (MEP) for the East of England region from 2016 to 2019.

== Early life ==
Mayer was born in High Wycombe, Buckinghamshire and brought up in Crawley, West Sussex. She graduated with a bachelor's degree in history from Exeter University in 2001 and has a master's degree in Politics and Parliamentary Studies from the University of Leeds.

== Politics ==
In the 2014 European Parliament election she stood in for the East of England region in second position on the Labour list, which did not yield a seat, but took over from Richard Howitt following his resignation.

Mayer is a member of the Labour Party's National Policy Forum, the GMB, UNISON and the Co-operative Party.

In the European Parliament she was Labour's spokesperson for the foreign affairs (16–18) and the economy (18–19) and a member of the US-EU Relations Delegation. She is the international co-ordinator for the Washington DC Statehood campaign.

A member of the Labour Animal Welfare Society, Alex is a animal welfare campaigner. She was awarded the Cruelty Free International Parliamentarian Award and took an 8 million signature petition to the United Nations in New York on the topic of animal free cosmetic testing.

Mayer has been a member of Amnesty International for over twenty years and worked on issues relating to the ongoing human rights abuses in Kashmir, as a member of the European Parliament Friends of Kashmir group.

In May 2024, Mayer was selected to be Labour's candidate for the new constituency of Dunstable and Leighton Buzzard at the 2024 general election.

On 4 July 2024, Mayer won the Dunstable and Leighton Buzzard seat from the Conservatives by a margin of 667 votes (1.4%), becoming the area's first female MP. She is the first Labour MP for the area in over 50 years since Labour's Gwilym Roberts won the South Bedfordshire constituency in 1966.

In October 2024, Mayer urged the Government to change the process of Daylight Saving Time, by putting clocks one hour ahead of Greenwich Mean Time in winter and two hours ahead in summer, in what was described as a "fundamental shake-up of time" that would provide people with an extra hour of daylight for eleven months of the year; Mayer proposed calling the new timezone "Churchill Time" after Sir Winston Churchill, who introduced the same idea during World War Two.

In July 2025, Mayer secured a deal with Amazon to have a label reading "Printed in Dunstable, United Kingdom" added to the millions of paperback books printed at the company's plant in the town. Mayer said, "Now every year millions of books will say that they're printed in Dunstable. It's a real boost for civic pride."
