= Vicky Ford =

British politician (born 1967)

The Right Honourable Vicky Ford
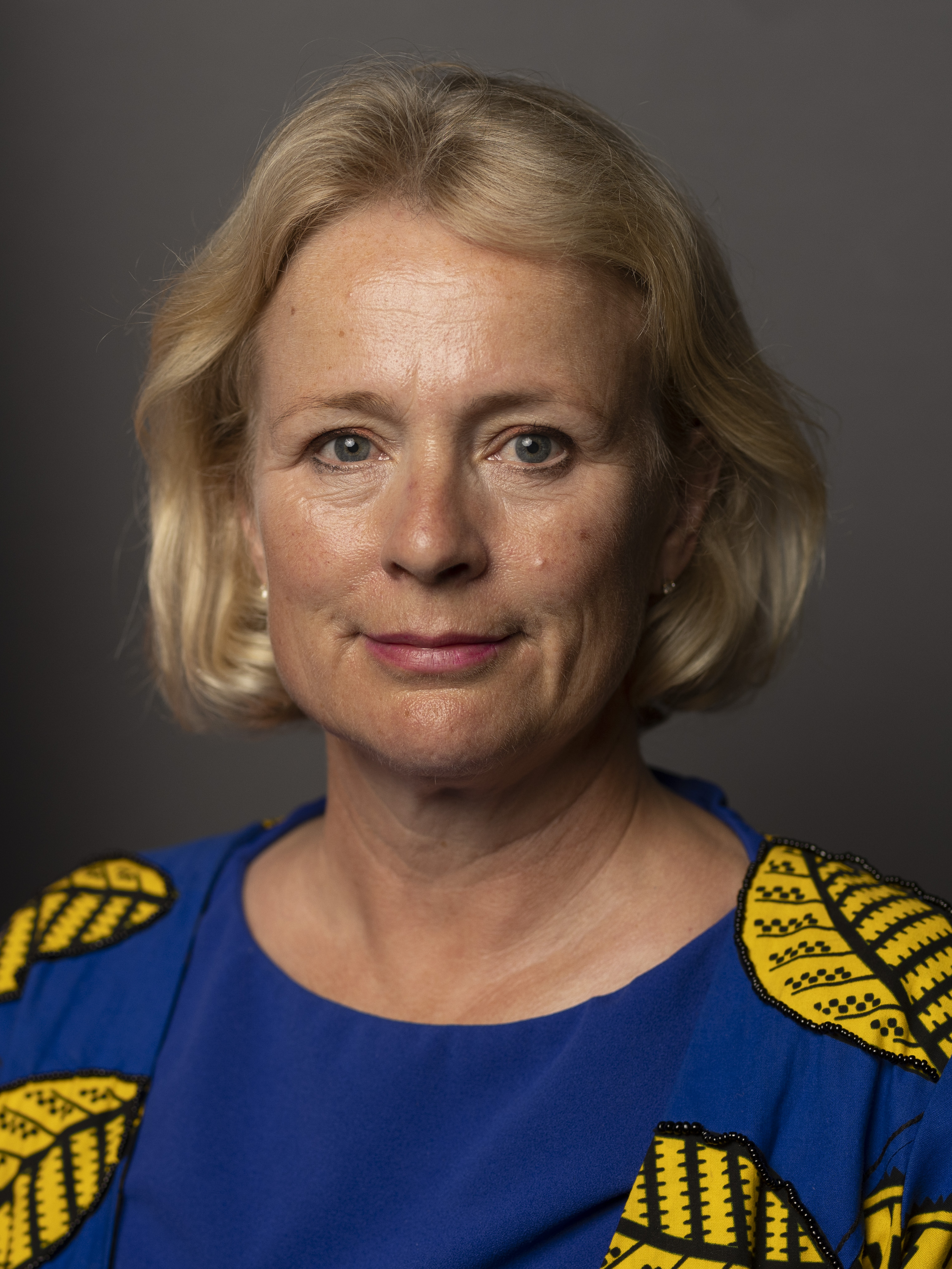
- Official portrait, 2022

Minister of State for Development
- In office 6 September 2022 – 25 October 2022
- Prime Minister: Liz Truss
- Preceded by: Office established (Note: Office is a re-establishment of the post for international development. Anne-Marie Trevelyan was the final Secretary of State for International Development before the office's abolition and merger with the Foreign and Commonwealth Office in 2020.)
- Succeeded by: Andrew Mitchell

Parliamentary Under-Secretary of State for Africa, Latin America and the Caribbean (Note: Parliamentary Under-Secretary of State for Africa from September to December 2021)
- In office 16 September 2021 – 6 September 2022
- Prime Minister: Boris Johnson
- Preceded by: James Duddridge
- Succeeded by: Gillian Keegan

Parliamentary Under-Secretary of State for Children and Families
- In office 14 February 2020 – 16 September 2021
- Prime Minister: Boris Johnson
- Preceded by: Kemi Badenoch
- Succeeded by: Will Quince

Member of Parliament for Chelmsford
- In office 8 June 2017 – 30 May 2024
- Preceded by: Simon Burns
- Succeeded by: Marie Goldman

Member of the European Parliament for East of England
- In office 4 June 2009 – 12 June 2017
- Preceded by: Christopher Beazley
- Succeeded by: John Flack

Personal details
- Born: Victoria Grace Pollock; 21 September 1967 (age 59) Omagh, County Tyrone, Northern Ireland
- Party: Conservative
- Spouse: Hugo Ford (m. 1996)
- Children: 3
- Education: Trinity College, Cambridge
- Website: vickyford.uk

Victoria Grace Ford (née Pollock, 21 September 1967) is a British politician who was the Member of Parliament (MP) for Chelmsford from 2017 to 2024. A member of the Conservative Party, she briefly served as Minister of State for Development from 6 September to 25 October 2022.

Ford served as a minister in the Department for Education from 2020 to 2021 before moving to the Foreign, Commonwealth and Development Office, in the government led by Boris Johnson. In September 2022, she was promoted by new Prime Minister Liz Truss to Minister of State for Development. She returned to the backbenches on 25 October 2022, resigning shortly after Liz Truss resigned as prime minister. Ford lost her seat for Chelmsford to the Liberal Democrats in the 2024 General Election.

== Early life and career ==
Victoria Pollock was born on 21 September 1967 in Omagh, County Tyrone, Northern Ireland, with her parents both English doctors. As a child, she joined her mother campaigning with the peace movement and her father stood in local elections for the Alliance Party of Northern Ireland.

She first attended Omagh Academy in Omagh, but following her father's death, she went to schools in England. Ford was educated at the independent St Paul's Girls' School and Marlborough College, before studying Maths and Economics at Trinity College, Cambridge.

Between 1989 and 2001, Ford worked for JPMorgan Chase. She was promoted to vice-president in their loan syndication department. In 2001, she joined Bear Stearns as managing director for loan capital markets where she worked until 2003.

== Political career ==
At the 2005 general election, Ford stood as the Conservative Party candidate in Birmingham Northfield, coming second with 28.9% of the vote behind the incumbent Labour Party MP Richard Burden.

In 2007, she was a major contributor to the Conservative Party's review of UK taxation "The Tax Reform Commission".

=== Member of the European Parliament ===
Ford was elected as a Member of the European Parliament for East of England in the 2009 European Parliament election.

As an MEP, Ford was the rapporteur for the Parliament on reforms to firearms laws, offshore oil and gas safety and the fiscal framework directive which seeks to increase transparency and accountability of public spending. She was a lead negotiator on the Horizon 2020 fund for research and on bank capital requirements, deposit guarantee schemes and residential mortgages.

From 2009 to 2014 she was a member of the European Parliament Committee on Industry, Research and Energy and the European Parliament Committee on Economic and Monetary Affairs.

From 2014 to 2017 she was Chair of the European Parliament Committee on the Internal Market and Consumer Protection, an economic committees of the Parliament, focusing on digital policy and unlocking trade opportunities for services and goods.

In 2016, Ford was ranked as one of the top ten most influential members of the European Parliament by Politico Europe, particularly for her work on digital policy.

== Parliamentary career ==
Ford was elected as MP for Chelmsford at the snap 2017 general election with 53.7% of the vote and a majority of 13,572. On 21 June 2017, Ford made her maiden speech in the Queen's speech debate, the first of the 2017 intake to do so.

In August 2018 Ford was appointed as Parliamentary Private Secretary to the Foreign and Commonwealth Office ministerial team.

At the 2019 general election, Ford was re-elected as MP for Chelmsford with an increased vote share of 55.9% and an increased majority of 17,621.

In the February 2020 cabinet reshuffle, Ford was appointed as the Minister for Children; a Parliamentary Under-Secretary of State at the Department for Education, with responsibility for children and families.

In the September 2021 Cabinet reshuffle, Ford ceased to serve as Minister for Children and became the new Parliamentary Under-Secretary of State for Africa at the Foreign, Commonwealth and Development Office. In January 2022, she issued a statement condemning the 2022 Burkina Faso coup d'état.

Ford was appointed Minister of State for Development, attending cabinet, by the incoming Prime Minister Liz Truss on 6 September 2022, and was appointed to the Privy Council on 13 September 2022 She left her post on 25 October when Rishi Sunak became Prime Minister and returned to the backbenches.

In 2024, Ford contested the Chelmsford constituency as the incumbent Member of Parliament, losing to Liberal Democrat Marie Goldman. It was the first time the constituency had not elected a Conservative Member of Parliament since the 1945 General Election.

== Personal life ==
Vicky married Hugo Ford in 1996, and together they have three children. The couple met at the University of Cambridge, where she was a student at Trinity College and he was a student at Magdalene College. He is an oncologist and is the director of cancer services at Addenbrooke's Hospital in Cambridge.

== Notes ==
European Parliament
Preceded by Christopher Beazley	Member of the European Parliament for East of England; 2009–2017	Succeeded by John Flack
Parliament of the United Kingdom
Preceded by Sir Simon Burns	Member of Parliament for Chelmsford; 2017–2024	Succeeded by Marie Goldman
Political offices
Preceded by Kemi Badenoch	Parliamentary Under-Secretary of State for Children and Families; 2020–2021	Succeeded by Will Quince
Preceded by James Duddridge	Minister for Africa; 2021–2022	Succeeded by Gillian Keegan
Preceded by Anne-Marie Trevelyan as Secretary of State for International Development	Minister of State for Development; 6 September–25 October 2022	Succeeded by Andrew Mitchell
