= Michael Heaver =

British former politician (born 1989)

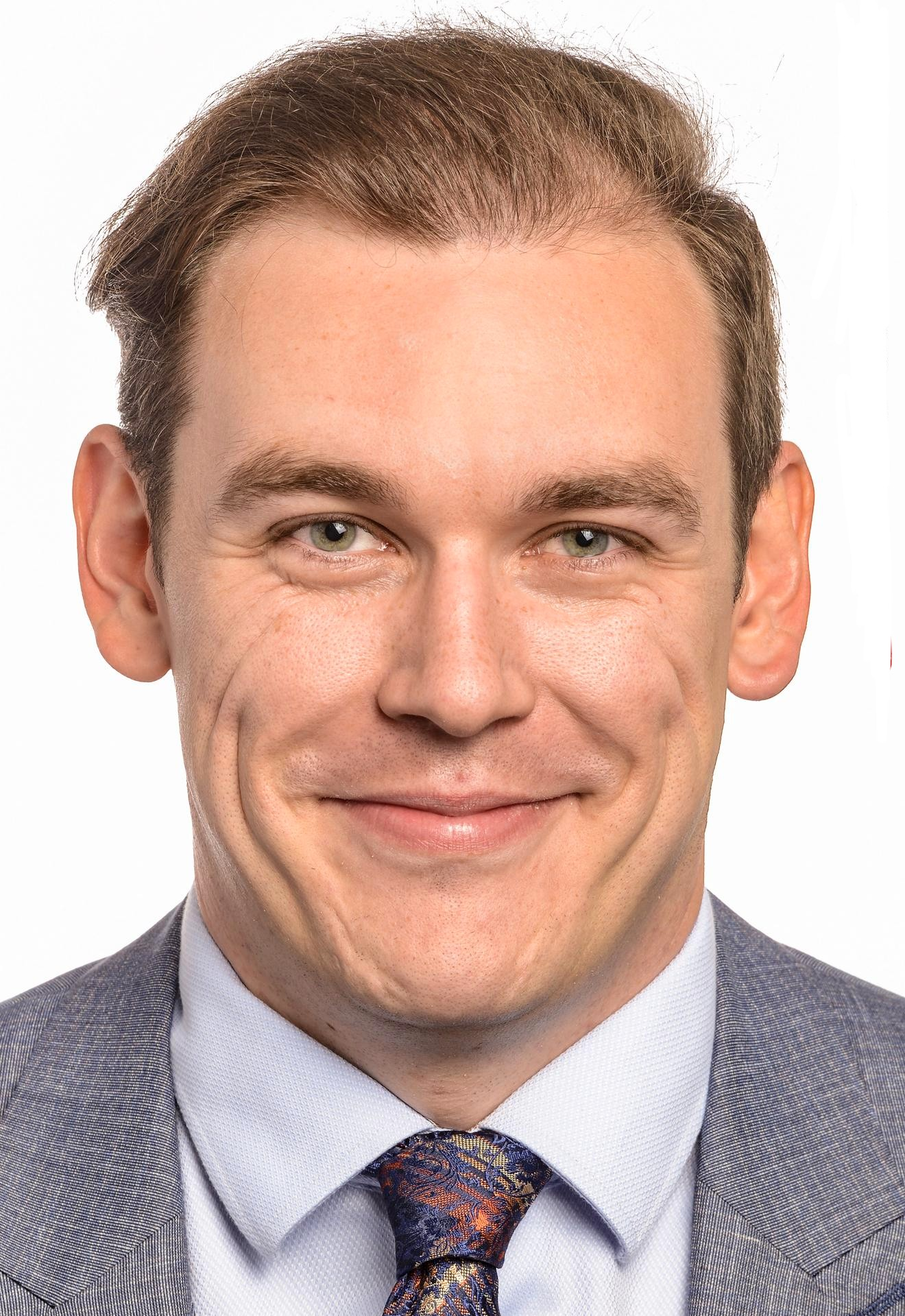
- Heaver in 2019

Member of the European Parliament for East of England
- In office 2 July 2019 – 31 January 2020
- Preceded by: Stuart Agnew
- Succeeded by: Constituency abolished

Personal details
- Born: 22 September 1989 (age 36) Cambridge, Cambridgeshire, England
- Party: Reform UK (2024–present)
- Other political affiliations: UKIP (before 2018); Conservatives (2018–2019); Brexit Party (2019–2021)
- Education: Coleridge Community College; Hills Road Sixth Form College
- Alma mater: University of East Anglia

Michael Eric Heaver (born 22 September 1989) is a British broadcaster and former politician. He was elected as a Brexit Party Member of the European Parliament (MEP) for the East of England constituency in the 2019 election and served in that role until the United Kingdom's withdrawal from the EU. Previously, he was the chair of the UK Independence Party (UKIP)'s youth wing, Young Independence.

== Early life ==
Michael Eric Heaver was born in Cambridge, Cambridgeshire. His early education was at Coleridge Community College and Hills Road Sixth Form College in Cambridge. He appeared on the panel of the BBC's topical debate programme Question Time on 10 July 2008, at the age of 18, after winning the people's panellist competition. In 2011, Heaver graduated from the University of East Anglia with a bachelor's degree in European politics.

== Career ==
=== Politics ===
Heaver joined the UK Independence Party (UKIP) at the age of 17, serving twice as the chair of their youth wing, Young Independence. He stood as a candidate for the party in the 2014 European parliamentary election in the East of England constituency. He also ran UKIP candidate Tim Aker's unsuccessful campaign for the Thurrock constituency in the 2015 general election and subsequently served as Nigel Farage's press officer until early 2017.

In 2018, Heaver left UKIP and joined the Conservative Party.

He stood as a candidate for the Brexit Party in the 2019 European parliamentary election. Heaver was second on his party's list behind only chairman Richard Tice, and was elected as one of its three MEPs in the East of England constituency. In the European Parliament, he was a member of the Committee on Budgetary Control and was part of the delegation for relations with the Korean Peninsula.

On 26 September 2019, the Brexit Party announced that Heaver was their prospective parliamentary candidate for the Castle Point constituency in Essex. However, the party announced on 11 November 2019 that it would not stand in incumbent Conservative seats.

=== Journalism ===
Heaver resigned from Farage's staff in January 2017 and, backed by political donor Arron Banks, launched the news website Westmonster, modelled on American right-wing sites like Breitbart News and the Drudge Report. It is now defunct, and the company behind it was struck off the Companies Register in 2020.

Heaver has a YouTube channel with over 200,000 subscribers, also started in January 2017, and is the GB News Community Editor.
