= Tim Aker =

British politician (born 1985)

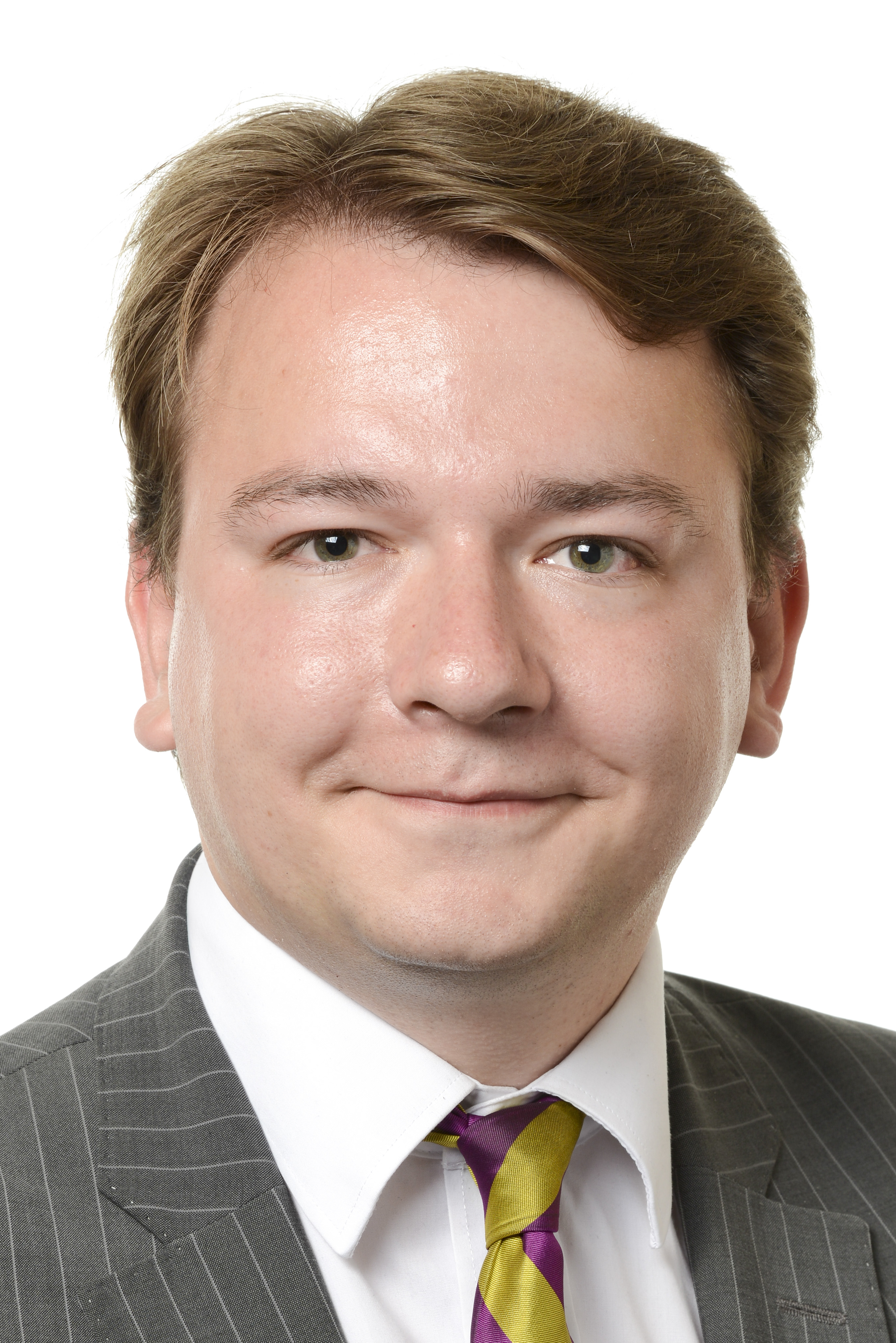
- Official portrait, 2014

Member of the European Parliament for the East of England
- In office 1 July 2014 – 1 July 2019
- Preceded by: Andrew Duff
- Succeeded by: June Mummery

Personal details
- Born: 23 May 1985 (age 41) Orsett, Essex, England
- Party: Conservative Party (2005); UK Independence Party (2014–2018); Thurrock Independents (2018–2019); Reform UK (2019–)
- Education: University of Nottingham, University of Buckingham

Timür Mark "Tim" Aker (born 23 May 1985) is a British politician who was a Member of the European Parliament for the East of England region. He was elected as a UK Independence Party (UKIP) candidate in 2014. He was head of UKIP's Policy Unit from August 2013 to January 2015, and was UKIP's candidate for the Thurrock constituency in the 2015 general election, coming third in a close 3-way election. Aker left UKIP and joined the Thurrock Independents where he also successfully sought election a councillor in 2018, before later joining the Brexit Party.

== Early life ==
Aker was born in Orsett to a Turkish father and an English mother, and grew up in Aveley. He attended Havering Sixth Form College. He went on to study at the University of Nottingham, graduating with a BA in History and Politics.

He was previously campaign director for Get Britain Out and a coordinator for the TaxPayers' Alliance.

== Political career ==
Referred to by The Spectator as one of UKIP's most recognisable figures, Aker stood unsuccessfully in the constituency of Thurrock in the 2015 general election (although he gained nearly 32% of the vote and came within 1000 votes of the winning candidate). On 20 January 2015, Aker quit as UKIP's Head of Policy, with some press reporting that he was sacked for failing to complete the party's manifesto on time, a claim which the party denied. Appointed as Local Government spokesman by Henry Bolton in October 2017, Aker left this post after Bolton failed to resign as leader following a vote of no confidence from UKIP's National Executive Committee.

After the ousting of Bolton as leader, Aker left UKIP. As of December 2018, he sat in the European Parliament as a Thurrock Independents MEP, while remaining a member of the Europe of Freedom and Direct Democracy parliamentary group. From February 2019 until the UK's departure from the EU, Aker sat in the European Parliament for the Brexit Party. He also resigned his seat on Thurrock council having moved away from the area.

== Elections contested ==
European Parliament elections (Multi-member constituency; party list)

Date of election	Region	Party	Votes	Percentage of votes	Result
2014 European election	East of England	UKIP	542,812	34.5	Elected

United Kingdom general elections (Single-member constituencies)

Date of election	Region	Party	Votes	Percentage of votes	Result
2015 general election	Thurrock	UKIP	15,718	31.7	Unelected
2017 general election	Thurrock	UKIP	10,112	20.1	Unelected

Thurrock Borough Council by-election (Single-member ward)

Date of election	Ward	Party	Votes	Percentage of votes	Result
2014 Thurrock Borough Council by-election	Aveley & Uplands	UKIP	747	40.9	Elected
2018 Thurrock Council election	Aveley & Uplands	Thurrock Independents	1,037	43.2	Elected

== After politics ==
Aker resigned as a councillor in February 2019 and chose not to seek re-election as an MEP in 2019.

He briefly worked for Amazon, before being appointed as the Development Manager for the Federation of Small Businesses in Kent and Medway.

== Personal life ==
Aker claims to have a private property portfolio and completed an MA in 20th Century British History at the University of Buckingham in March 2022, where he is now a PhD student.

European Parliament
Preceded by Andrew Duff	Member of the European Parliament for East of England; 2014–2019	Next: June Mummery
