= Bashir Khanbhai =

British politician (1945–2020)

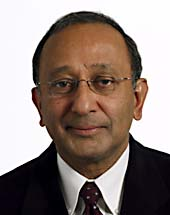

Member of the European Parliament for East of England
- In office 10 June 1999 – 10 June 2004
- Preceded by: Constituency created
- Succeeded by: Tom Wise

Personal details
- Born: 22 September 1945 Tanga, Tanganyika
- Died: 16 April 2020 (aged 74) Sevenoaks, England
- Party: Conservative
- Education: The School of Pharmacy; Balliol College, Oxford (MA)

Bashir Khanbhai (22 September 1945 – 16 April 2020) was a British Conservative Party politician who served as a Member of the European Parliament (MEP) for the East of England.

Born in Tanga, Tanzania, Khanbhai worked in the family business and took a degree in pharmacy at the School of Pharmacy, University of London, then a BA (and automatic further Oxford MA) in politics, philosophy and economics at the University of Oxford. He also became a member of the Standing Committee of the Oxford Union. Khanbhai joined the Conservative Party, and stood for them in Norwich South at the 1997 general election, but was not elected. At the 1999 European Parliament election, he was elected from third position on the Conservative Party list in the East of England.

In 2004, Khanbhai repaid £7,000 of wrongly claimed travel expenses; although he lived in Sevenoaks, Kent, he had registered a boatyard in Wroxham as his home address. In light of this expenses scandal, he was deselected by his party, and did not stand in the 2004 election. He subsequently claimed that he had been treated differently from other Conservative MEPs in similar positions, ascribing this to racist elements within the party.
