= Jeffrey Titford =

British politician (1933–2024)

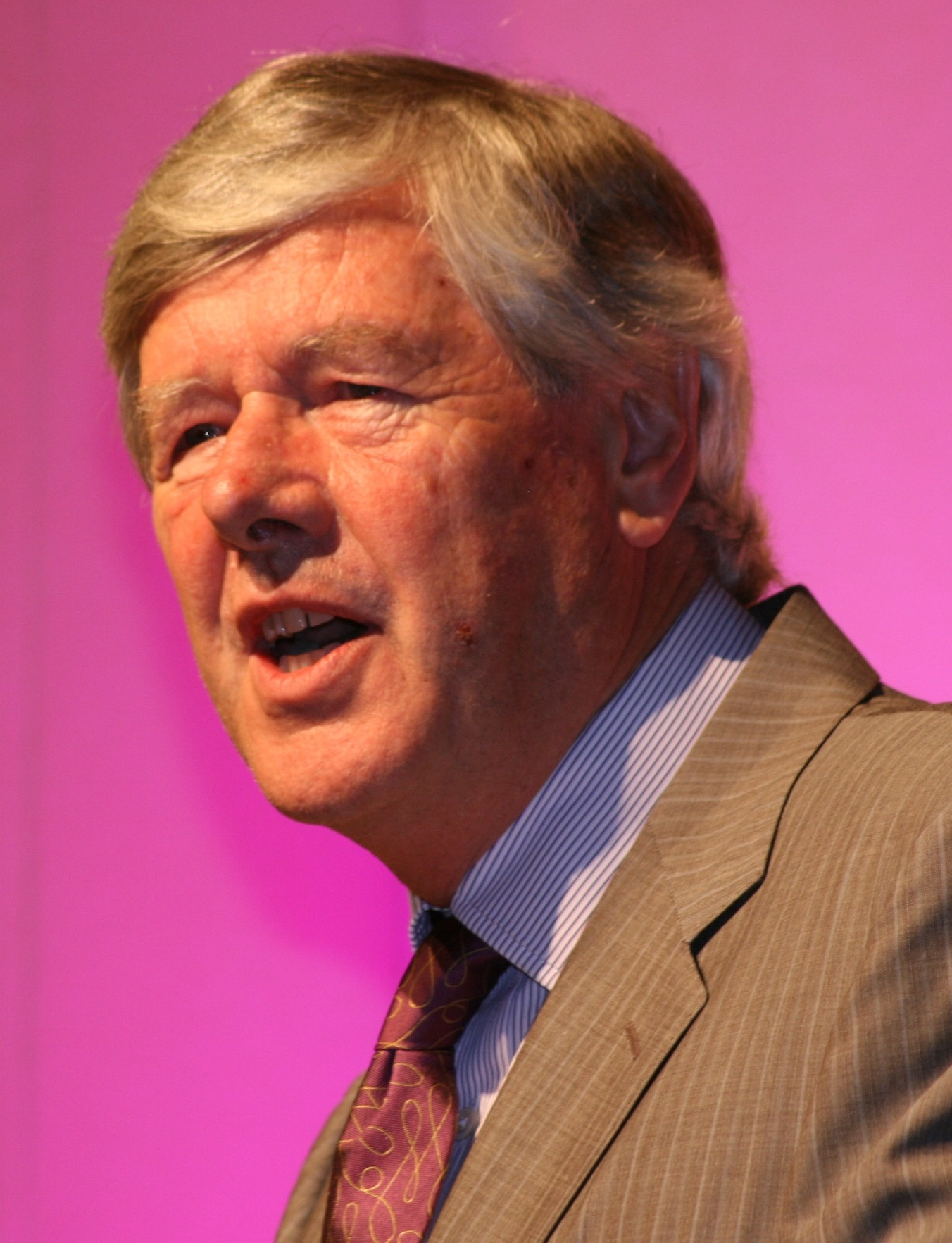
- Titford in 2008

Leader of the UK Independence Party
- Acting; 6 September 2010 – 5 November 2010
- Preceded by: The Lord Pearson of Rannoch
- Succeeded by: Nigel Farage
- In office 22 January 2000 – 5 October 2002
- Preceded by: Michael Holmes
- Succeeded by: Roger Knapman

Member of the European Parliament for East of England
- In office 15 July 1999 – 15 July 2009
- Preceded by: Position established
- Succeeded by: Stuart Agnew

Personal details
- Born: Jeffrey William Titford; 24 October 1933 West Mersea, Essex, England
- Died: 9 September 2024 (aged 90)
- Party: Reform UK (2023–2024); UK Independence Party (1997–2023); New Britain Party (1997); Referendum Party (1997); Conservative (until 1992)
- Spouse: Margaret Titford

Jeffrey William Titford (24 October 1933 – 9 September 2024) was a British politician who served as leader of the UK Independence Party (UKIP) from 2000 until 2002. He served again as interim leader in September to November 2010, following the resignation of Lord Pearson of Rannoch. He was also a Member of the European Parliament (MEP) for the East of England from 1999 to 2009. Before entering politics he was a businessman and president of the National Association of Funeral Directors.

== Political career ==
Before joining UKIP, he had been at various times a member of the Conservative Party (for whom he was a local councillor in Clacton-on-Sea), the New Britain Party and the Referendum Party. He was the most successful Referendum Party candidate in the 1997 general election, winning nearly 10 per cent of the vote in Harwich. Later that year he joined UKIP.

In 1999, Titford became one of the first UKIP representatives to win a seat in the European Parliament. UKIP's then leader, Michael Holmes, resigned in 2000 amidst serious infighting. Titford narrowly won the ensuing leadership election, promising to reunite the party and restore its effectiveness as a campaigning organisation. This he largely succeeded in doing. The Guardian newspaper described him in 2001 as "an emollient man, a sort of William Whitelaw figure, and an ideal leader for such a fractious party". He led UKIP into the 2001 general election, in which it stood more than 420 candidates but failed to make any breakthroughs (although it did consolidate its position as the largest of the smaller parties). Titford stepped down as party leader in October 2002, in order to allow his successor time to plan his strategy for the 2004 European elections. He also wanted to spend more time on political campaigns in the East of England, where he continued to be an active MEP. He was re-elected with a greatly increased share of the vote in the 2004 European elections. At this election, UKIP also returned a second MEP, Tom Wise.

At the 2005 general election, Titford again contested Harwich. He came fourth of six candidates, polling 2,314 votes, a share of 4.6%, losing his deposit. Titford stepped down from the European Parliament at the 2009 European elections. He and Wise were succeeded as UKIP MEPs for the East of England by David Campbell Bannerman and Stuart Agnew.

Titford was regarded by many in UKIP as the nearest the party had to an elder statesman. In October 2005, UKIP's leader Roger Knapman announced that he was appointing Titford as party chairman for an interim period.

== Death ==
Titford died from cancer on 9 September 2024, at the age of 90.

Party political offices
| Preceded by Michael Holmes | Leader of the UK Independence Party; 2000–2002 | Succeeded by Roger Knapman |
| Preceded by Malcolm Pearson | Leader of the UK Independence Party; 2010 | Succeeded by Nigel Farage |
