= East of England (European Parliament constituency) =

Former European Parliament constituency

- European Parliament constituency
- Location among the 2014 constituencies

- Shown within England
- Member state: United Kingdom
- Created: 1999
- Dissolved: 31 January 2020
- MEPs: 8 (1999–2004); 7 (2004–2020)

East of England was a constituency of the European Parliament that was coterminous with the East of England region. It returned 7 MEPs using the D'Hondt method of party-list proportional representation, until the UK exit from the European Union on 31 January 2020.

== Boundaries ==
The constituency corresponded to the East of England region of the United Kingdom, comprising the ceremonial counties of Bedfordshire, Cambridgeshire, Essex, Hertfordshire, Norfolk and Suffolk.

== History ==
It was formed as a result of the European Parliamentary Elections Act 1999, replacing a number of single-member constituencies. At the time of their abolition in 1999, these were Cambridgeshire, Essex North and Suffolk South, Essex South, Essex West and Hertfordshire East, Hertfordshire, Norfolk, Suffolk and South West Norfolk, and parts of Bedfordshire and Milton Keynes.

MEPs for former East of England constituencies, 1979–1999
Election	1979–1984	1984–1989	1989–1994	1994–1999
Cambridgeshire (1979–1984); Cambridge and Bedfordshire North (1984–1994); Cambridgeshire (1994–1999)	Fred Catherwood; Conservative			Robert Sturdy; Conservative
Essex North East (1979–1994); Essex North and Suffolk South (1994–1999)	David Curry; Conservative		Anne McIntosh; Conservative	
Bedfordshire (1979–1984); Bedfordshire South (1984–1994); Bedfordshire and Milton Keynes (1994–1999)	Peter Beazley; Conservative			Eryl McNally; Labour
Essex South West (1979–1994); Essex West and Hertfordshire East (1994–1999)	Dr. Alexander Sherlock; Conservative		Patricia Rawlings; Conservative	Hugh Kerr; Labour (1994–1997); Scottish Socialist Party (1997–1999)
Hertfordshire (1979–1999)	Derek Prag; Conservative			Peter Truscott; Labour
Norfolk (1979–1999)	Paul Howell; Conservative			Clive Needle; Labour
Suffolk (1979–1994); Suffolk and South West Norfolk (1994–1999)	Amédée Turner; Conservative			David Thomas; Labour
Essex South (1994–1999)	Seat not established			Richard Howitt; Labour

== Returned members ==
MEPs for the East of England, 1999 onwards
Election	1999 (5th parliament)	2004 (6th parliament)	2009 (7th parliament)	2014 (8th parliament)	2019 (9th parliament)
MEP Party	Geoffrey Van Orden; Conservative				
MEP Party	Christopher Beazley; Conservative		Vicky Ford; Conservative (2009–2017)	John Flack; Conservative (2017–2019)	Barbara Gibson; Liberal Democrat
MEP Party	Bashir Khanbhai; Conservative	Tom Wise; UKIP (2004–2009); Independent (2009)	David Campbell Bannerman; UKIP (2009–2011); Conservative (2011–2019)		Lucy Nethsingha; Liberal Democrat
MEP Party	Robert Sturdy; Conservative			Patrick O'Flynn; UKIP (2014–2018); SDP (2018–2019)	Richard Tice; Brexit Party
MEP Party	Jeffrey Titford; UKIP		Stuart Agnew; UKIP		Michael Heaver; Brexit Party
MEP Party	Andrew Duff; Liberal Democrat			Tim Aker; UKIP (2014–2018); Thurrock Independents (2018–2019); Brexit Party (2019)	June Mummery; Brexit Party
MEP Party	Richard Howitt; Labour (1999–16)			Alex Mayer; Labour (2016–2019)	Catherine Rowett; Green Party
MEP Party	Eryl McNally; Labour	Seat abolished			

Key to political groups of the European Parliament (UK)
Party			Faction in European Parliament	
Brexit Party	29		Non-Inscrits	57
DUP	1		Non-Inscrits	57
Liberal Democrats	16	17	Renew Europe	108
Alliance	1	17	Renew Europe	108
Green	7	11	Greens–European Free Alliance	75
SNP	3	11	Greens–European Free Alliance	75
Plaid Cymru	1	11	Greens–European Free Alliance	75
Labour	10		Socialists and Democrats	154
Conservative	4		European Conservatives and Reformists Group	62
Sinn Féin	1		European United Left–Nordic Green Left	41
Total	73		Total	750

== Election results ==
Elected candidates are shown in bold. Brackets indicate the number of votes per seat won.

=== 2019 ===
Popular vote winners by district, 2019

European election 2019: East of England (results)
List	Candidates	Votes	Of total (%)	± from prev.
Brexit Party	**Richard Tice** (1) **Michael Heaver** (3) **June Mummery** (5) Paul Hearn, Priscilla Huby, Sean Lever, Edmund Fordham	604,715 (201,391.67)	37.83	New
Liberal Democrats	**Barbara Gibson** (2) **Lucy Nethsingha** (6) Fionna Tod, Stephen Robinson, Sandy Walkington, Marie Goldman, Jules Ewart	361,563 (180,751.5)	22.62	+15.72
Green	**Catherine Rowett** (4) Rupert Read, Martin Schmierer, Fiona Radic, Paul Jeater, Pallavi Devulapalli, Jeremy Caddick	202,460	12.67	+4.17
Conservative	**Geoffrey Van Orden** (7) John Flack, Joe Rich, Thomas McLaren, Joel Charles, Wazz Mughal, Thomas Smith	163,830	10.25	−18.15
Labour	Alex Mayer, Chris Vince, Sharon Taylor, Alvin Shum, Anna Smith, Adam Scott, Javeria Hussain	139,490	8.73	−8.57
Change UK	Emma Taylor, Neil Carmichael, Bhavna Joshi, Michelle de Vries, Amanda Gummer, Thomas Graham, Roger Casale	58,274	3.65	New
UKIP	Stuart Agnew, Paul Oakley, Elizabeth Jones, William Ashpole, Alan Graves, John Wallace, John Whitby	54,676	3.42	−31.08
English Democrat	Robin Tilbrook, Charles Vickers, Bridget Vickers, Paul Wiffen	10,217	0.64	−1.09
Independent	Attila Csordas	3,230	0.20	New
Rejected ballots		9,589		
Turnout		1,603,017	36.37	+0.5

=== 2014 ===
Popular vote winners by district, 2014

European election 2014: East of England (results)
List	Candidates	Votes	Of total (%)	± from prev.
UKIP	**Patrick O'Flynn**, **Stuart Agnew**, **Tim Aker** Michael Heaver, Mick McGough, Andy Monk, Mark Hughes	542,812 (180,937)	34.5	+14.9
Conservative	**Vicky Ford**, **Geoffrey van Orden**, **David Campbell Bannerman** John Flack, Tom Hunt, Margaret Simons, Jonathan Collett	446,569 (148,856)	28.4	−2.8
Labour	**Richard Howitt** Alex Mayer, Sandy Martin, Bhavna Joshi, Paul Bishop, Jane Basham, Chris Ostrowski	271,601	17.3	+6.8
Green	Rupert Read, Mark Ereira-Guyer, Jill Mills, Ash Haynes, Marc Scheimann, Robert Lindsay, Fiona Radic	133,331	8.5	−0.3
Liberal Democrats	Andrew Duff, Josephine Hayes, Belinda Brooks-Gordon, Stephen Robinson, Michael Green, Linda Jack, Hugh Annand	108,010	6.9	−6.9
An Independence from Europe	Paul Kevin Wiffen, Karl Berresford Davies, Raymond Charles Mitchell Spalding, Edmond Max Rosenthal, Rupert Smith, Dennis James Wiffen, Betty Patricia Wiffen	26,564	1.7	New
English Democrat	Robin Tilbrook, Charles Vickers, Stephen Goldspink, Maria Situmbeko, Bridget Cowan, Don Whitbread, Jeremy Moreton-Moss	16,497	1.1	−1.0
BNP	Richard Andrew Perry, Christopher Eric Livingstone, Mark James Burmby, Paul Stephen Hooks, Stephen Leonard Smith, Philip David Howell, Michael Edward Braun	12,465	0.8	−5.3
CPA	Carl Shaun Clark, Mark Anthony Clamp, Chris Olley, Stephen John Todd, Jane Elizabeth Clamp, Kirsty Evans, Kevin John Austin	11,627	0.7	New
NO2EU	Brian Denny, Frank Jepson, Steve Glennon, Phil Katz, Eleanor Donne, Pete Relph, Ron Rodwell	4,870	0.3	−0.6
Turnout		1,574,346	35.9	−1.8

=== 2009 ===
Popular vote winners by district, 2009

European election 2009: East of England
List	Candidates	Votes	Of total (%)	± from prev.
Conservative	**Geoffrey van Orden**, **Robert Sturdy**, **Vicky Ford** John Flack, Jonathan Morgan, Claire Strong, Clare Wheelan	500,331 (166,777)	31.2	+0.4
UKIP	**David Campbell Bannerman**, **Stuart Agnew** Andrew Smith, Stuart Gulleford, Amy O'Boyle, Mick McGough, Michael Baker, Marion Mason	313,921 (156,960)	19.6	0.0
Liberal Democrats	**Andrew Duff** Linda Jack, Ian Mack, Peter Welch, Earnshaw Palmer, Andrew Houseley, Qurban Hussain	221,235	13.8	−0.2
Labour	**Richard Howitt** Beth Kelly, Nigel Gardner, Sherma Batson, James Valentine, Kate Curtis, Chris Ostrowski	167,833	10.5	−5.7
Green	Rupert Read, Peter Lynn, James Abbott, Marc Scheimann, Angela Thomson, Andrew Stringer, Amy Drayson	141,016	8.8	+3.2
BNP	Eddy Butler, Emma Colgate, Stephen McCole, David Fleming, David Lucas, Mark Fuller, Seamus Dunne	97,013	6.1	+1.8
UK First	Robin Page, Peter Cole, Charles Lawson, John West, Arthur Baynes	38,185	2.4	New
English Democrat	Robin Tilbrook, Charles Vickers, John Cooper, Raymond Brown, Adrian Key, Nicholas Capp, Patrick Harris	32,211	2.0	+0.2
Christian	Jeremy Tyrrell, Kim Christofi, John Jackson, Grace Oghenegare, Rev Dr Albert Usikaro, Douglas Suckling, Sally Craig	24,646	1.5	New
NO2EU	Brian Denny, Frank Jepson, Steve Glennon, Phil Katz, Eleanor Donne, Pete Relph, Ron Rodwell	13,939	0.9	New
Socialist Labour	James Dry, Patricia Bowen, Paul Hardman, Martha Page-Harries, Jacob Bowen, Miriam Scale, Andrew Jordan	13,599	0.8	New
Animal Welfare	Jasmijn de Boo, Alexander Bourke, Richard Deboo	13,201	0.8	New
Libertas	Andrew Jamieson, Peter Mason, John Dowdale, Carlo de Chair, Henry Burton, John Harmer, Peter Robbins	9,940	0.6	New
Independent	Peter Rigby	9,916	0.6	New
Jury Team	Andrew Armes, Ian Tyes, Stephen Garton, Jules Sherrington, Andrew Parker, Michael Yates	6,354	0.4	New
Turnout		1,603,340	37.7	+1.2

=== 2004 ===
Popular vote winners by district, 2004

European election 2004: East of England
List	Candidates	Votes	Of total (%)	± from prev.
Conservative	**Geoffrey van Orden**, **Robert Sturdy**, **Christopher Beazley** Jonathan Morgan, Claire Strong, Richard Normington	465,526 (155,175.33)	30.8	−11.9
UKIP	**Jeffrey Titford**, **Tom Wise** Robin Page, Stuart Agnew, Bryan Smalley, Brian Aylett, Roger Lord	296,160 (148,080)	19.6	+10.7
Labour	**Richard Howitt** Elizabeth Kelly, Clive Needle, Sandra Griffiths, Nigel Gardner, Valerie Liddiard, Mark Wells	244,929	16.2	−8.9
Liberal Democrats	**Andrew Duff** Christopher White, Anne Pollard, Rosalind Gill, Guillaume McLaughlin, Earnshaw Palmer, Nahid Boethe	211,378	14.0	+2.1
Independent	Martin Bell	93,028	6.2	New
Green	Margaret Wright, Adrian Ramsay, James Abbott, Marc Scheimann, Ingo Wagenknecht, Stephen Rackett, Stephen Lawrence	84,068	5.6	−0.6
BNP	Matthew Single, Paul Goodchild, Ramon Johns, Bernard Corby, Sidney Chaney, Peter Turpin	65,557	4.3	+3.4
English Democrat	Robert Kay, James Samuels, Adrian Key, Gloria Meredew, Michael Blundell	26,807	1.8	New
Respect	Jim Rogers, Maz Cook, Adrian Clarke, Hasna Matin, Paul Turnbull, Marie Bunting, Timothy Sneller	13,904	0.9	New
Independent	Jim Naisbitt	5,137	0.3	New
ProLife Alliance	Sarah Bell, Thomas Hoey, Beata Klepacka, John Matthews, Michael McBrien, Gregory Tagney, Clare Underwood	3,730	0.3	New
Turnout		1,510,224	36.5	+11.8

=== 1999 ===
Popular vote winners by district, 1999

European election 1999: East of England
List	Candidates	Votes	Of total (%)	± from prev.
Conservative	**Robert Sturdy**, **Christopher Beazley**, **Bashir Khanbhai**, **Geoffrey van Orden** Robert Gordon, Kay Twitchen, Graham Bright, Charles Rose	425,091 (106,272.75)	42.7	
Labour	**Eryl McNally**, **Richard Howitt** Clive Needle, Peter Truscott, David Thomas, Virginia Bucknor, Beth Kelly, Ruth Bagnall	250,132 (125,066)	25.1	
Liberal Democrats	**Andrew Duff** Rosalind Scott, Robert Browne, Lorna Spenceley, Chris White, Charlotte Cane, Paul Burall, Rosalind Gill	118,822	11.9	
UKIP	**Jeffrey Titford** Bryan Smalley, Brian Lee, Tom Wise, Roger Lord, Charles Lawman, Ashley Banks, William Vinyard	88,452	8.9	
Green	Margaret Wright, Marc Scheimann, Eleanor Burgess, Malcolm Powell, James Abbott, Jennifer Berry, Angela Thomson, Adrian Holmes	61,334	6.2	
Liberal	Brian Lynch, Michael Wheeler, Raymond Pobgee, Vernon Wilkinson, Adrian Miners, John Tyler, Edgar Davis, Christopher Ash	16,861	1.7	
Pro-Euro Conservative	Paul Howell, Brian Hughes, Jackie Sheppard, Chris Cooke, Marilyn Munn, Mark McCartney, Tim Chisnall, Tim Price	16,340	1.6	
BNP	David King, Paul Ferguson, John Morse, Ramon Johns, Paul Henderson, Matthew Palmer, John Cope, Thomas Stone	9,356	0.9	
Socialist Labour	Charles De Carteret, Nicola Harau, Paul Lockwood, Stephanie Gardner, Michael Benwell, Mick Rose, Jean Fawcett, Andrew Yates	6,143	0.6	
Natural Law	Patrice Gladwyn, Bryan Parsons, Angela Holland, Peter While, Stephanie Bennell, Alistair Shearer, Ann Keenan, Christopher Edwards	1,907	0.2	
Turnout		994,438	24.7	
