= Stuart Agnew =

British politician

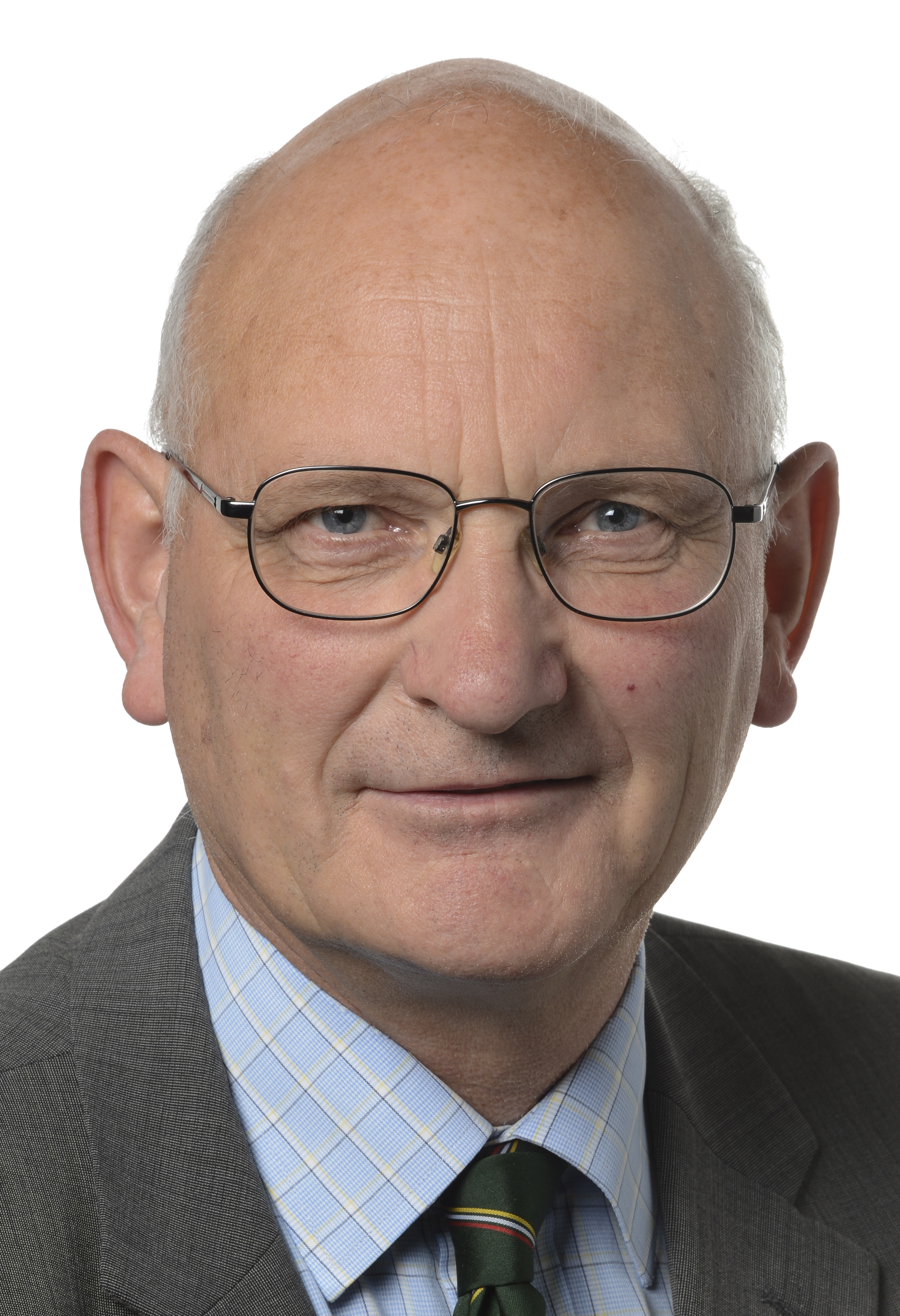

Deputy Leader of the UK Independence Party in the European Parliament
- In office 16 April 2019 – 1 July 2019
- Leader: Gerard Batten
- Preceded by: Ray Finch
- Succeeded by: Office abolished

Member of the European Parliament for East of England
- In office 7 June 2009 – 1 July 2019
- Preceded by: Jeffrey Titford
- Succeeded by: Michael Heaver

UKIP portfolios
- 2014–2019: Environment, Food and Rural Affairs

Personal details
- Born: John Stuart Agnew; 30 August 1949 (age 77) Norwich, Norfolk, England
- Party: Reform UK (since 2021); UK Independence Party (until 2019)
- Education: Royal Agricultural College

John Stuart Agnew (born 30 August 1949) is a British politician who served as Member of the European Parliament (MEP) for the East of England region for the UK Independence Party (UKIP) from 2009 to 2019.

== Early life and career ==
Agnew was born in Norwich, and educated at the Royal Agricultural College. During the 1970s he worked in Rhodesia as a soil conservation officer, as well as being a reserve in the Rhodesian Army. A long-time UKIP member, he is a Norfolk farmer who formerly represented Norfolk on the NFU Council.

== Political career ==
He sat on the European Parliament Committee on Agriculture and Rural Development.

He was the UKIP candidate in Mid Norfolk at the 2001 general election, in Norfolk North at the 2005 general election, and in Broadland at the 2010 and 2015 general elections.

As UKIP's Shadow Secretary of State for Environment, Food and Rural Affairs, Agnew has described climate change science as "the global warming scam". In the European Parliament in 2015, he stated that plants need carbon dioxide as food, so "if you succeed in decarbonising Europe, our crops will have no natural gas to grow from". Richard A. Betts of the Met Office described this as a misunderstanding, since cutting emissions did not mean reducing existing levels of carbon dioxide in the atmosphere.

In the 2017 UKIP leadership election, he was the running-mate of Anne Marie Waters.

In April 2019, Agnew was appointed Deputy Leader of UKIP in the European Parliament following the resignation of Ray Finch, and it was reported that he spoke to the Springbok Club.

Agnew lost his seat at the 2019 European Parliament election, when UKIP dropped to seventh position with 3.42% of the regional vote.
