= Richard Howitt (politician) =

British politician (born 1961)

Cllr Richard Howitt
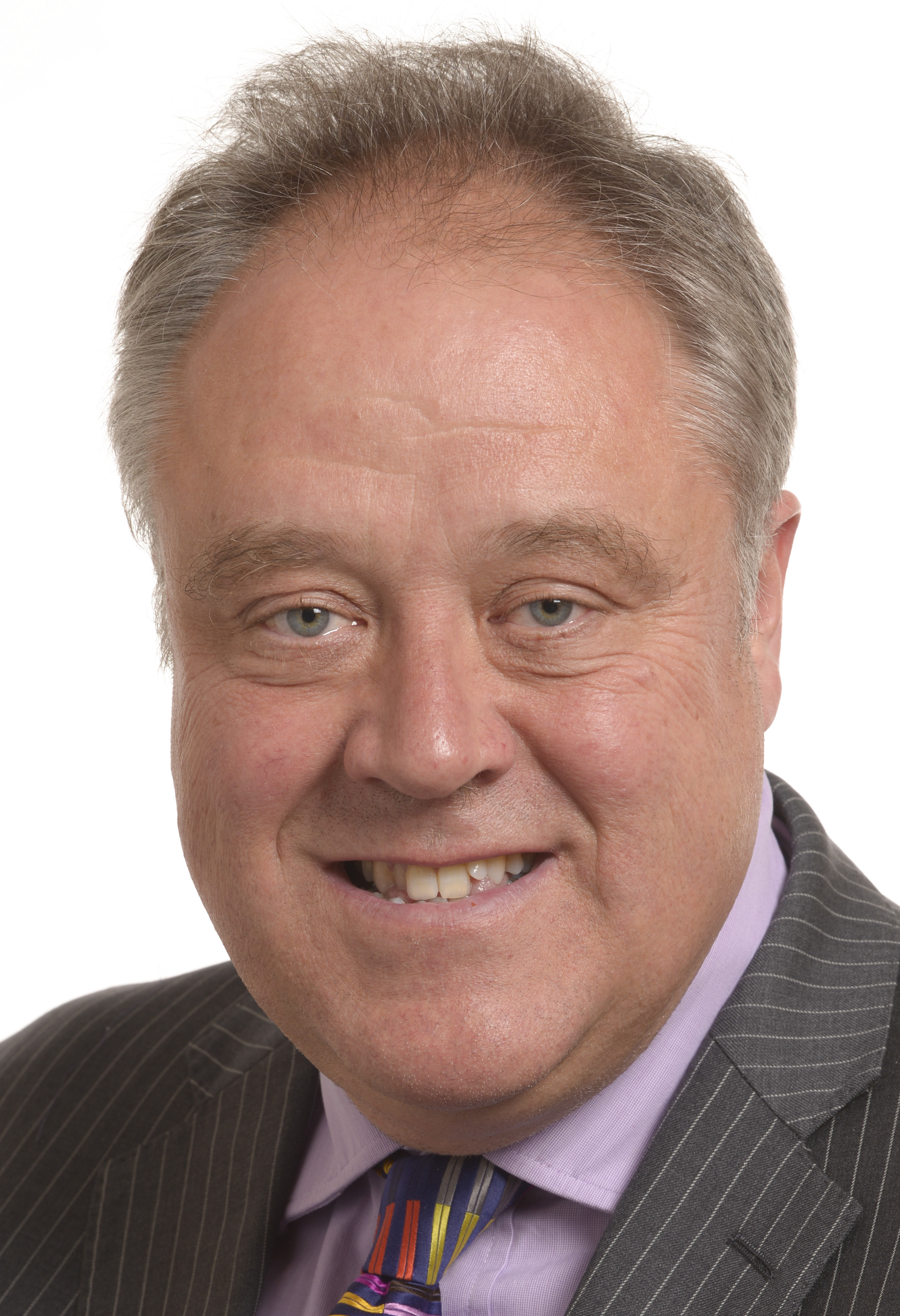

Cambridgeshire County Councillor for Petersfield
- Incumbent
- Assumed office 6 May 2021
- Preceded by: Linda Jones
- Majority: 430 (14.1%)

Member of the European Parliament for the East of England Essex South (1994-1999)
- In office 9 June 1994 – 2 November 2016
- Preceded by: Position established
- Succeeded by: Alex Mayer

Personal details
- Born: 5 April 1961 (age 65) Reading, Berkshire
- Party: PES / Labour
- Children: Ollie Howitt-Sutton, Georgia Howitt-Sutton
- Education: Lady Margaret Hall, Oxford

Richard Stuart Howitt (born 5 April 1961) is a British politician who served as a Member of the European Parliament (MEP) for the East of England (formerly Essex South) from 1994 to 2016. A member of the Labour Party, he has represented Petersfield on the Cambridgeshire County Council since 2021.

== Background ==
Howitt was born in Reading, Berkshire. He was brought up in a single-parent family, in a council house, and went to a comprehensive school. He graduated with a BA degree in Philosophy, politics and economics from Lady Margaret Hall, Oxford in 1982 and has a Postgraduate Diploma in Management Studies from the University of Hertfordshire.

After leaving university, he worked for four years in the voluntary sector and eight years for a disability organisation.

== Political activity ==
Howitt served as a councillor on Harlow District Council from 1983 to 1995, including three years as Leader of the council. Here he spearheaded some groundbreaking work assessing local government's environmental impact. He was the Labour Party candidate in Billericay in the 1987 general election.

Howitt was elected as an MEP to the European Parliament, representing the Essex South constituency, and served for the East of England constituency from 1999 to 2016.

Howitt is a key architect of the EU's non-financial information directive, one of the biggest transformations in corporate disclosure anywhere in the world. He was rapporteur on corporate reporting-related issues, including social responsibility, for many years. On this topic he has been described as a "trailblazer".

As lead-MEP on corporate responsibility, Mr Howitt has represented the EU on many missions worldwide, travelling extensively in Asia, Africa and the Americas. He has represented European interests in numerous international initiatives, including the UN Business and Human Rights Forum and the OECD Forum on Responsible Business Conduct.

Howitt helped to negotiate a £22 million European Union fund to help finance food banks in the UK, but in 2013 the UK government refused to accept the funds. Howitt stated:

It is very sad that our government is opposing this much-needed help for foodbanks on the basis that it is a national responsibility, when in reality it has no intention of providing the help itself. The only conclusion is that Conservative anti-European ideology is being put before the needs of the most destitute and deprived in our society.

Howitt was a member of the Labour Party's National Policy Forum between 1994 and 2016. He supported Owen Smith in the 2016 Labour leadership election.

In September 2016, Howitt announced his resignation from the European Parliament to become chief executive of the International Integrated Reporting Council. The Labour candidate next on the party list from the 2014 European Elections, Alex Mayer, replaced him as MEP.

In May 2021, he was elected as a member of Cambridgeshire County Council. He is Chair of the Adults and Health Committee.
