= Andrew Duff =

British politician

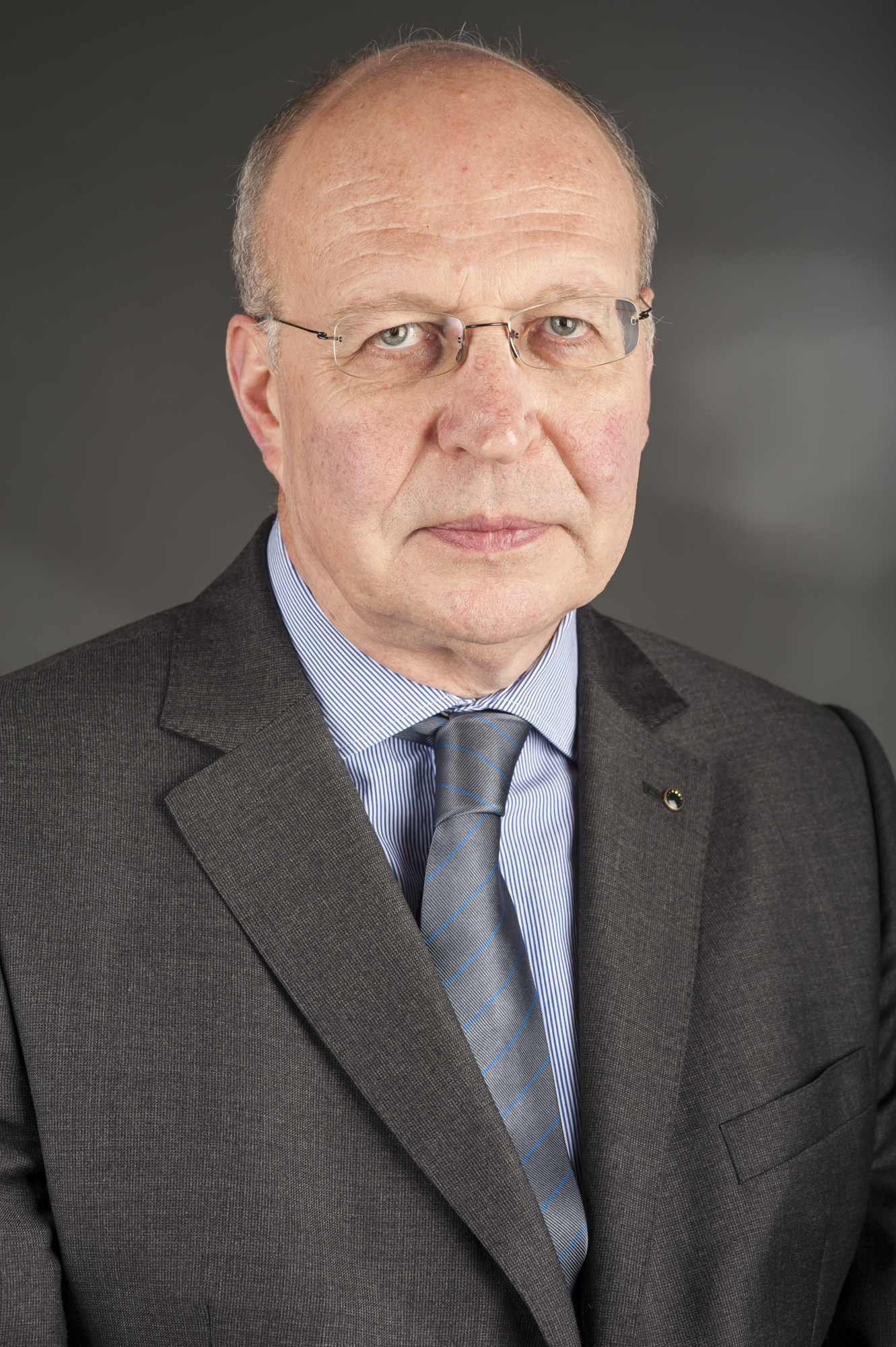

Member of the European Parliament for East of England
- In office 10 June 1999 – 2 July 2014
- Preceded by: Position established
- Succeeded by: Tim Aker

President of the Union of European Federalists
- In office 11 October 2008 – 16 November 2013
- Preceded by: Mercedes Bresso
- Succeeded by: Elmar Brok

Personal details
- Born: 25 December 1950 (age 75) Birkenhead, Cheshire, England, UK
- Party: Liberal Democrat
- Education: Sherborne School; St John's College, Cambridge

Andrew Nicholas Duff OBE (born 25 December 1950) is a British politician who presided over the Union of European Federalists (UEF) from 2008 to 2013. A member of the Liberal Democrats, he served as a Member of the European Parliament (MEP) for the East of England from 1999 to 2014.

== Early life ==
He was educated at Sherborne School and St John's College, Cambridge.

== Political career ==
He initially stood in the 1984 European Parliament election, finishing third with 22.5% of the vote. In the 1989 election he polled 8% of the vote, coming fourth, then in the 1994 election he came third with 20%. The constituencies were largely representing Cambridgeshire and at times parts of Bedfordshire.

With the electoral change to regional party-list proportional representation, he was first elected in the 1999 European Parliament election when the Liberal Democrats won 12% of the regional vote, and retained his seat in the 2004 and 2009 elections when they won 14% of the regional vote. He lost his seat in 2014 when his party took less than 7% in the region.

Between October 2008 and November 2013 Andrew Duff was president of the Union of European Federalists (UEF). On 15 September 2010 Duff together with UEF initiated the Spinelli Group, which was founded to reinvigorate the strive for federalisation of the European Union (EU). Other prominent supporters are: Jacques Delors, Daniel Cohn-Bendit, Guy Verhofstadt, Elmar Brok.

He was a City Councillor in Cambridge from 1982 to 1990 and was Vice-President of the Liberal Democrats from 1994 to 1997. At the 1992 general election he stood against the then-Prime Minister, John Major, in the Huntingdon constituency, coming in third place with 12% of the vote. In October 2007 he joined the European Council on Foreign Relations.

== Honours ==
He was awarded an OBE for services to politics in 1997.
