= Robert Sturdy =

British farmer and politician (born 1944)

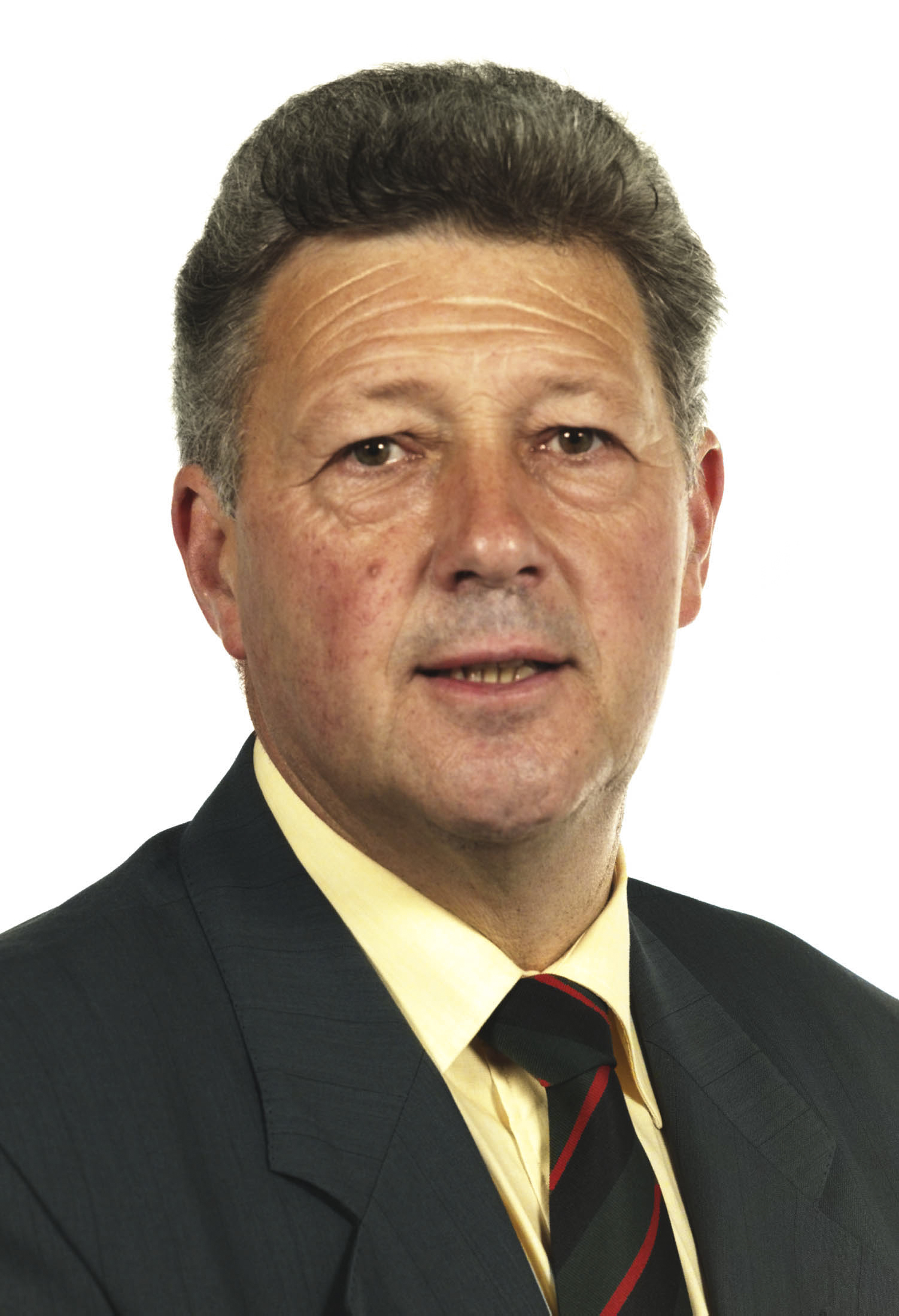
- Sturdy in 1999

Member of the European Parliament for East of England
- In office 10 June 1999 – 26 May 2014
- Preceded by: Position established
- Succeeded by: Patrick O'Flynn

Member of the European Parliament for Cambridge and Bedfordshire North
- In office 9 June 1994 – 10 June 1999
- Preceded by: Position established
- Succeeded by: Position abolished

Personal details
- Born: 22 June 1944 (age 82) Wetherby, West Riding of Yorkshire, England
- Party: Conservative
- Children: Julian Sturdy
- Education: Sussex University

Robert William Sturdy (born 22 June 1944, in Wetherby, West Riding of Yorkshire) is a British politician, and former Member of the European Parliament (MEP) for the East of England constituency for the Conservative Party. He held the seat from 1999 until 2014. Before then, he was the MEP for Cambridge and Bedfordshire North, from 1994 to 1999.

Sturdy was educated at the independent Ashville College. Before being elected he was a farmer and is a former county chair of the Young Farmers.

His son, Julian Sturdy, was the Conservative MP for York Outer from 2010 to 2024.
