= Geoffrey Van Orden =

Leader of the Conservatives in the European Parliament

Brigadier Geoffrey Van Orden CBE
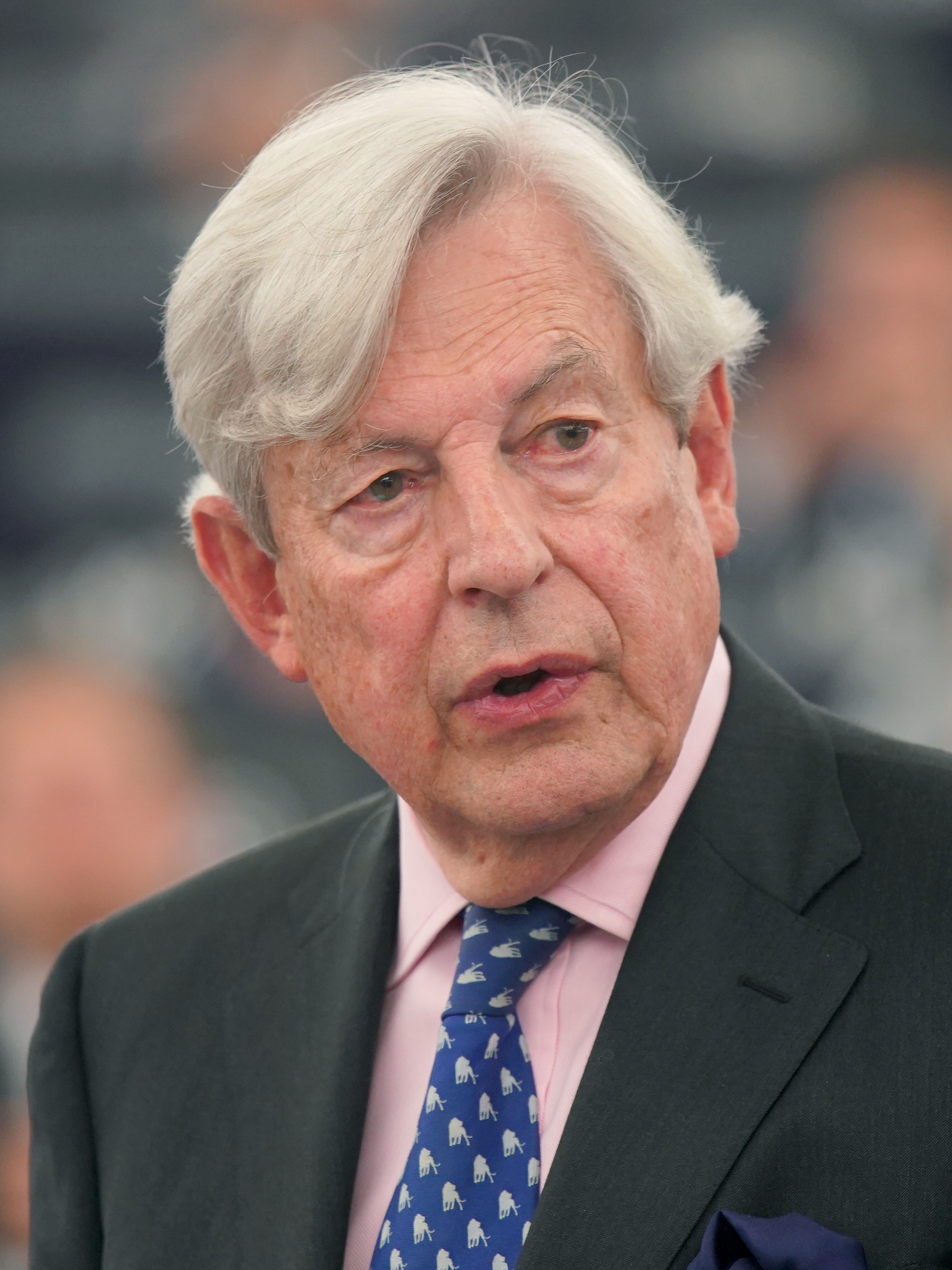
- Geoffrey Van Orden in 2019

Leader of the Conservatives in the European Parliament
- In office 2 July 2019 – 31 January 2020
- Preceded by: Ashley Fox
- Succeeded by: Position abolished

Member of the European Parliament for East of England
- In office 10 June 1999 – 31 January 2020
- Preceded by: Constituency established
- Succeeded by: Constituency abolished

Personal details
- Born: 10 April 1945 (age 81) Waterlooville, Hampshire, England
- Party: Conservative
- Children: 3
- Education: University of Sussex
- Profession: Soldier
- Awards: CBE
- Website: www.geoffreyvanorden.com

Military service
- Allegiance: United Kingdom of Great Britain and Northern Ireland
- Branch/service: British Army
- Years of service: 1964–1994
- Rank: Brigadier
- Unit: Intelligence Corps

Brigadier Geoffrey Charles Van Orden CBE (born 10 April 1945) is a British politician and former British Army officer who served as Leader of the Conservatives in the European Parliament from 2019 to 2020. He was a Member of the European Parliament (MEP) for the East of England region from 1999 to 2020.

== Early life and career ==
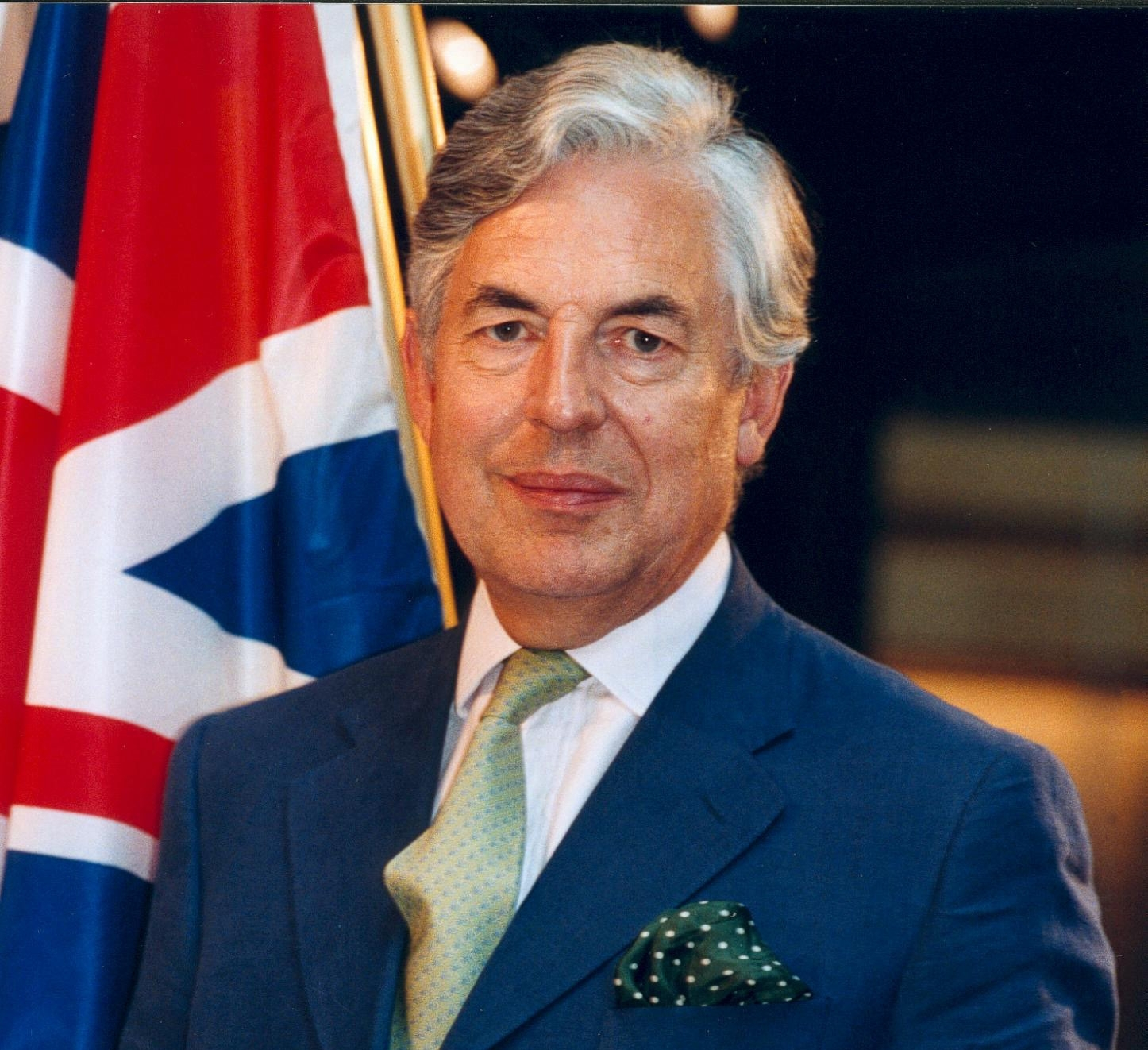
Van Orden in 2004

Van Orden was born in Waterlooville, Hampshire in 1945. He attended the Mons Officer Cadet School and was commissioned into the Intelligence Corps in 1964. He read politics at Sussex University from 1966 to 1969. He was promoted lieutenant in 1966, captain in 1970, major in 1977, lieutenant-colonel in 1983, colonel in 1988, and brigadier in 1991.

He began his military career in Borneo during the Confrontation war with Sukarno's Indonesia. He was appointed a Member of the Order of the British Empire (MBE) at the age of 27 for special duties in Northern Ireland in the early 1970s, at the height of the terrorist campaign. He spent many years in Germany, including 5 years in Berlin where, in 1989, he was Chief of Staff of the British Sector and head of the military intelligence staff when the Wall fell. He was a member of the Cabinet office intelligence Assessment Staff. He attended the Indian Defence Services Staff College and was an instructor at the German General Staff College College (Führungsakademie der Bundeswehr) from 1985 to 1988 in Hamburg. His last military appointment was at NATO headquarters in Brussels where he headed the secretariat of the International Military Staff.

He resigned his commission in 1995 in order to enter politics. While seeking a parliamentary seat he became a senior advisor in the European Commission in the field of foreign and security policy issues. He held this post until 1999, when he was elected as a Member of the European Parliament for the Conservative Party.

== European Parliament ==
=== Defence and security ===
Following his election to the European Parliament, he became the Conservatives' spokesman for Foreign, Defence and Security policy. He was one-time Vice Chairman of the Foreign Affairs Committee and remained a member of that committee and of the Security and Defence (SEDE) sub-committee. He has been the Conservative Defence & Security Spokesman for nearly two decades. He has led the opposition to EU defence integration and advanced the need for revitalisation of the NATO Alliance. He has been active in the promotion of Britain's defence industries.

=== Foreign affairs ===
He has long-standing experience of India, was a founder member of the Parliament's "Friends of India" group, Chairman of the Europe-India Chamber of Commerce and, since 2014, Chairman of the parliament's official Delegation for Relations with India.

He also chairs the "Friends of Sri Lanka" and "Friends of Zimbabwe", where he was a consistent and outspoken opponent of the Mugabe regime.

He was elected as the Co-Chairman of the Asia-Europe Political Forum, involving some 360 political parties from 52 Asian countries. During the accession of Bulgaria to the European Union, Van Orden was the rapporteur for Bulgaria in the European Parliament, and regularly reported on the progress of the country with regard to EU membership requirements. His final report in November 2006 confirmed Bulgaria's preparedness to join the EU.

=== Terrorism ===
He is Vice Chairman of the Special Committee on Terrorism. His commitment to counter-terrorism has informed some of his involvement in countries such as Sri Lanka, India, Israel and the Gulf states.

=== European Conservatives & Reformists ===
He was instrumental in the creation of the European Conservatives & Reformists (ECR) political group in the European Parliament, an event that had the aim of building support for conservative change in the European Union. He was its Vice Chairman for most of the time since its foundation in 2009, growing to become the third largest of eight groups in the Parliament, with members from 18 countries. He is also the Founding President of its think-tank, New Direction - the Foundation for European Reform, whose patron was Baroness Thatcher (her last major public event was to launch New Direction, in the City of London).

== Political positions ==
Van Orden has said he is a eurosceptic seeking reform of the EU while trying to avoid a total break. He is opposed to European political integration. He believes in and facilitates the enlargement of the EU so as to make an ever closer union more difficult to achieve. He is opposed to British membership of the euro, the Treaty establishing a Constitution for Europe and the Treaty of Lisbon. He had long campaigned for the Conservative Party to end their association with the European People's Party in the European Parliament, an aim which was finally achieved in 2009.

Van Orden was the last Conservative MEP to declare a position prior to the Brexit referendum. He opted to vote to remain for pragmatic reasons, in particular to avoid the UK suffering economic disruption and loss of influence, giving control of the continent to Berlin and Paris.

Van Orden is a founding president of the New Direction think tank and is also a member of the Bow Group think tank.

== Personal life ==
Geoffrey van Orden married Frances Elizabeth "Fanny" Weir in 1974. The couple have three daughters. He is a member of the Countryside Alliance and the BASC. He was a research associate at the International Institute for Strategic Studies and a Service fellow of King's College London as well as Freeman of the City of London and the Worshipful Company of Painter- Stainers.
