= List of female members of the European Parliament for the United Kingdom =

This is a list of women who were members of the European Parliament representing the United Kingdom. As well as those elected at European elections, it includes members appointed as delegates between 1973 and 1979.

UK MEPs could simultaneously served as MPs or life peers until the 2009 European elections, when any prior peers would have to take a formal leave of absence from the Lords to avoid the dual mandate.

== List ==
| Party | Name | Constituency | Start | End | Reason |
|---|---|---|---|---|---|
| Conservative | Peggy Fenner (Note: Also served as a Member of Parliament (MP).) | Delegate | 1974 | 1975 | Retired |
| Labour | Betty Boothroyd (Note: Also served as a Member of the House of Lords.) | Delegate | 1975 | 1977 | Retired |
| Labour | Gwyneth Dunwoody | Delegate | 1975 | 1979 | Retired |
| Labour | Doris Fisher | Delegate | 1975 | 1979 | Retired |
| Conservative | Beata Brookes | North Wales | 1979 | 1989 | Defeated |
| Labour | Janey Buchan | Glasgow | 1979 | 1994 | Retired |
| Labour | Barbara Castle | Greater Manchester | 1979 | 1989 | Retired |
| Labour | Ann Clwyd | Mid and West Wales | 1979 | 1984 | Resigned to serve as an MP |
| Conservative | Diana Elles | Thames Valley | 1979 | 1989 | Retired |
| SNP | Winnie Ewing (Note: Also served as a Member of the Scottish Parliament (MSP).) | Highlands and Islands | 1979 | 1999 | Retired |
| Conservative | Norvela Forster | Birmingham South | 1979 | 1984 | Defeated in Birmingham East |
| Conservative | Gloria Hooper | Liverpool | 1979 | 1984 | Defeated in Merseyside West |
| Conservative | Elaine Kellett-Bowman | Cumbria | 1979 | 1984 | Retired |
| Labour | Joyce Quin | Tyne South and Wear (1979–1984); Tyne and Wear (1984–1989) | 1979 | 1989 | Retired |
| Conservative | Shelagh Roberts | London South West | 1979 | 1989 | Defeated |
| Labour | Christine Crawley | Birmingham East | 1984 | 1999 | Retired |
| Conservative | Margaret Daly | Somerset and Dorset West | 1984 | 1994 | Defeated in Somerset and North Devon |
| Conservative | Sheila Faith | Cumbria and Lancashire North | 1984 | 1989 | Retired |
| Conservative | Caroline Jackson | Wiltshire (1984–1994); Wiltshire North and Bath (1994–1999); South West England (1999–2009) | 1984 | 2009 | Retired |
| Labour | Carole Tongue | London East | 1984 | 1999 | Defeated in London |
| Labour | Pauline Green | London North (1989–1999); London (1999–2000) | 1989 | 2000 | Resigned |
| Conservative | Anne McIntosh | Essex North East (1989–1994); Essex North and Suffolk South (1994–1999) | 1989 | 1999 | Retired |
| Labour | Christine Oddy | Midlands Central | 1989 | 1999 | Resigned from Labour |
| Independent | Christine Oddy | Midlands Central | 1999 | 1999 | Defeated |
| Labour | Anita Pollack | London South West | 1989 | 1999 | Defeated in London |
| Conservative | Patricia Rawlings | Essex South West | 1989 | 1994 | Defeated in Essex West and Hertfordshire East |
| Labour | Angela Billingham | Northamptonshire and Blaby | 1994 | 1999 | Defeated in East Midlands |
| Labour | Veronica Hardstaff | Lincolnshire and Humberside South | 1994 | 1999 | Defeated in Yorkshire and the Humber |
| Labour | Glenys Kinnock | South Wales East (1994–1999); Wales (1999–2009) | 1994 | 2009 | Resigned to join government. |
| Labour | Eluned Morgan (Note: Also served as a Member of the Senedd (MS) or Assembly Member (AM).) | Mid and West Wales (1994–1999); Wales (1999–2009) | 1994 | 2009 | Retired |
| Labour | Susan Waddington | Leicester | 1994 | 1999 | Defeated in Yorkshire and the Humber |
| Labour | Linda McAvan | Yorkshire and the Humber | 1998 | 2019 | Resigned |
| Liberal Democrats | Elspeth Attwooll | Scotland | 1999 | 2009 | Retired |
| Plaid Cymru | Jill Evans | Wales | 1999 | 2020 | UK exited the EU |
| Conservative | Jacqueline Foster | North West England | 1999 | 2004 | Defeated |
| Conservative | Jacqueline Foster | North West England | 2009 | 2019 | Retired |
| Labour | Neena Gill | West Midlands | 1999 | 2009 | Defeated |
| Labour | Neena Gill | West Midlands | 2014 | 2020 | UK exited the EU |
| Green | Jean Lambert | London | 1999 | 2019 | Retired |
| Green | Caroline Lucas | South East England | 1999 | 2010 | Resigned to serve as an MP |
| Liberal Democrats | Sarah Ludford | London | 1999 | 2014 | Defeated |
| Liberal Democrats | Liz Lynne | West Midlands | 1999 | 2012 | Resigned |
| Liberal Democrats | Emma Nicholson | South East England | 1999 | 2009 | Retired |
| Labour | Catherine Stihler | Scotland | 1999 | 2019 | Resigned |
| Conservative | Theresa Villiers | London | 1999 | 2005 | Resigned to serve as an MP |
| Liberal Democrats | Diana Wallis | Yorkshire and the Humber | 1999 | 2012 | Resigned |
| Labour | Mary Honeyball | London | 2000 | 2019 | Retired |
| Sinn Féin | Bairbre de Brún (Note: Also served as a Member of the Legislative Assembly (MLA).) | Northern Ireland | 2004 | 2012 | Resigned |
| Liberal Democrats | Fiona Hall | North East England | 2004 | 2014 | Retired |
| Liberal Democrats | Sharon Bowles | South East England | 2005 | 2014 | Retired |
| Labour | Glenis Willmott | East Midlands | 2006 | 2017 | Resigned |
| UKIP | Marta Andreasen | South East England | 2009 | 2013 | Resigned from UKIP |
| Conservative | Marta Andreasen | South East England | 2013 | 2014 | Defeated |
| Liberal Democrats | Catherine Bearder | South East England | 2009 | 2020 | UK exited the EU |
| DUP | Diane Dodds | Northern Ireland | 2009 | 2020 | UK exited the EU |
| Conservative | Vicky Ford | East of England | 2009 | 2017 | Resigned to serve as an MP |
| Conservative | Julie Girling | South West England | 2009 | 2018 | Resigned from the Conservative Party |
| Independent | Julie Girling | South West England | 2018 | 2019 | Retired |
| Conservative | Emma McClarkin | East Midlands | 2009 | 2019 | Defeated |
| UKIP | Nikki Sinclaire | West Midlands | 2009 | 2011 | Expelled from UKIP |
| Independent | Nikki Sinclaire | West Midlands | 2010 | 2012 | Founded We Demand a Referendum Now |
| We Demand a Referendum | Nikki Sinclaire | West Midlands | 2012 | 2014 | Defeated |
| Conservative | Kay Swinburne | Wales | 2009 | 2019 | Retired |
| Conservative | Marina Yannakoudakis | London | 2009 | 2014 | Defeated |
| Conservative | Anthea McIntyre | West Midlands | 2011 | 2020 | UK exited the EU |
| Liberal Democrats | Rebecca Taylor | Yorkshire and the Humber | 2012 | 2014 | Retired |
| Sinn Féin | Martina Anderson | Northern Ireland | 2012 | 2020 | UK exited the EU |
| Labour | Lucy Anderson | London | 2014 | 2019 | Retired |
| UKIP | Janice Atkinson | South East England | 2014 | 2015 | Expelled from UKIP |
| Independent | Janice Atkinson | South East England | 2015 | 2019 | Retired |
| UKIP | Louise Bours | North West England | 2014 | 2018 | Resigned from UKIP |
| Independent | Louise Bours | North West England | 2018 | 2019 | Retired |
| UKIP | Jane Collins | Yorkshire and the Humber | 2014 | 2019 | Resigned from UKIP |
| Brexit Party | Jane Collins | Yorkshire and the Humber | 2019 | 2019 | Retired |
| Labour | Anneliese Dodds | South East England | 2014 | 2017 | Resigned to serve as an MP |
| Labour | Theresa Griffin | North West England | 2014 | 2020 | UK exited the EU |
| UKIP | Diane James | South East England | 2014 | 2018 | Resigned from UKIP |
| Brexit Party | Diane James | South East England | 2018 | 2019 | Retired |
| Labour | Judith Kirton-Darling | North East England | 2014 | 2020 | UK exited the EU |
| Labour | Clare Moody (Note: Also served as a Police and Crime Commissioner (PCC).) | South West England | 2014 | 2019 | Defeated |
| UKIP | Margot Parker | East Midlands | 2014 | 2019 | Resigned from UKIP |
| Brexit Party | Margot Parker | East Midlands | 2019 | 2019 | Retired |
| UKIP | Julia Reid | South West England | 2014 | 2019 | Resigned from UKIP |
| Brexit Party | Julia Reid | South West England | 2019 | 2019 | Retired |
| Green | Molly Scott Cato | South West England | 2014 | 2020 | UK exited the EU |
| UKIP | Jill Seymour | West Midlands | 2014 | 2019 | Resigned from UKIP |
| Brexit Party | Jill Seymour | West Midlands | 2019 | 2019 | Retired |
| Labour | Julie Ward | North West England | 2014 | 2020 | UK exited the EU |
| Labour | Alex Mayer | East of England | 2016 | 2019 | Defeated |
| Conservative | Nosheena Mobarik | Scotland | 2017 | 2020 | UK exited the EU |
| Liberal Democrats | Jane Brophy | North West England | 2019 | 2020 | UK exited the EU |
| Liberal Democrats | Judith Bunting | South East England | 2019 | 2020 | UK exited the EU |
| Green | Ellie Chowns | West Midlands | 2019 | 2020 | UK exited the EU |
| Brexit Party | Belinda de Lucy | South East England | 2019 | 2020 | UK exited the EU |
| Green | Gina Dowding | North West England | 2019 | 2020 | UK exited the EU |
| Brexit Party | Claire Fox | North West England | 2019 | 2020 | UK exited the EU |
| Liberal Democrats | Barbara Gibson | East of England | 2019 | 2020 | UK exited the EU |
| Brexit Party | Lucy Harris | Yorkshire and the Humber | 2019 | 2019 | Left the Brexit Party, became an independent |
| Independent | Lucy Harris | Yorkshire and the Humber | 2019 | 2020 | Joined the Conservatives |
| Conservative | Lucy Harris | Yorkshire and the Humber | 2020 | | UK exited the EU |
| Labour | Jackie Jones | Wales | 2019 | 2020 | UK exited the EU |
| Brexit Party | Christina Jordan | South West England | 2019 | 2020 | UK exited the EU |
| Alliance | Naomi Long | Northern Ireland | 2019 | 2020 | UK exited the EU |
| SNP | Aileen McLeod | Scotland | 2019 | 2020 | UK exited the EU |
| Brexit Party | June Mummery | East of England | 2019 | 2020 | UK exited the EU |
| Liberal Democrats | Lucy Nethsingha | East of England | 2019 | 2020 | UK exited the EU |
| Brexit Party | Alex Phillips | South East England | 2019 | 2020 | UK exited the EU |
| Green | Alex Phillips | South East England | 2019 | 2020 | UK exited the EU |
| Liberal Democrats | Luisa Porritt | London | 2019 | 2020 | UK exited the EU |
| Brexit Party | Annunziata Rees-Mogg | East Midlands | 2019 | 2019 | Left the Brexit Party, became an independent |
| Independent | Annunziata Rees-Mogg | East Midlands | 2019 | 2020 | Joined the Conservatives |
| Conservative | Annunziata Rees-Mogg | East Midlands | 2020 | | UK exited the EU |
| Liberal Democrats | Sheila Ritchie | Scotland | 2019 | 2020 | UK exited the EU |
| Green | Catherine Rowett | East of England | 2019 | 2020 | UK exited the EU |
| Liberal Democrats | Caroline Voaden | South West England | 2019 | 2020 | UK exited the EU |
| Liberal Democrats | Irina von Wiese | London | 2019 | 2020 | UK exited the EU |
| Brexit Party | Ann Widdecombe | South West England | 2019 | 2020 | UK exited the EU |
| SNP | Heather Anderson | Scotland | 2020 | | UK exited the EU |
