= South West London =

South West London may refer to several things related to London, England:

- SW postcode area
- South West (London sub region) (2008–2011), a regional planning designation
- Western part of South London
- South West (London Assembly constituency) (from 2000)
- London South West (European Parliament constituency) (1979–1999)
