= Birmingham East =

Birmingham East may refer to:

- Birmingham East (European Parliament constituency) (1984–1999)
- Birmingham East (UK Parliament constituency) (1885–1918)
