= Essex South =

Essex South or South Essex may refer to:

- Essex South (federal electoral district), a federal riding in Ontario, Canada, 1882–1968
- Essex South (provincial electoral district), a provincial riding in Ontario, Canada, 1875–1999
- South Essex (UK Parliament constituency), a constituency of the British House of Commons, 1832–1885
- Essex South (European Parliament constituency), 1994–1999
- South Essex Regiment (later known as the Prince of Wales' Own Volunteers), a fictional British Army regiment that is the principal setting in Bernard Cornwell's Sharpe series of Napoleonic War-era historical novels
