= Hugh Kerr =

British politician (born 1944)

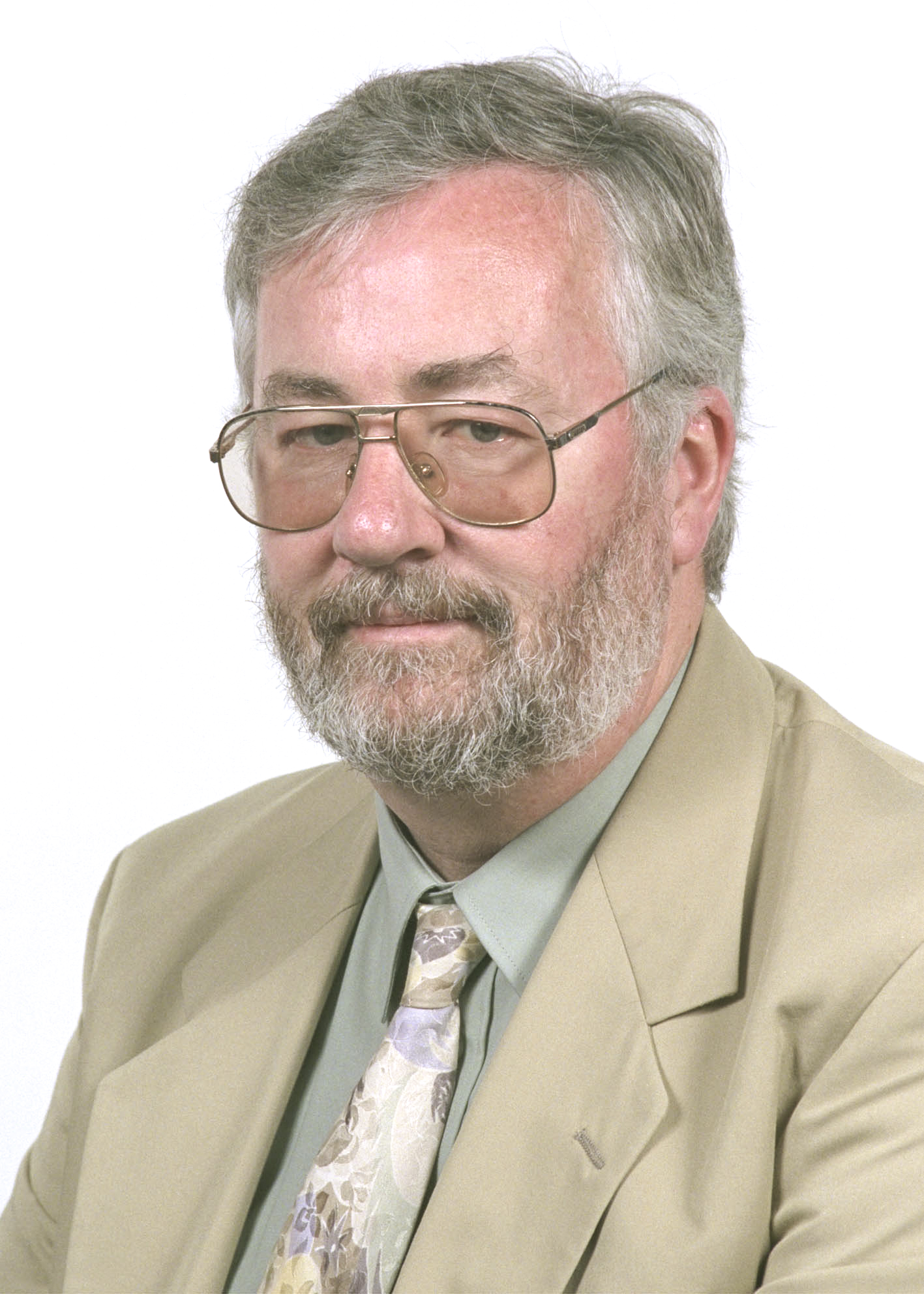
- Kerr in 1994

Member of the European Parliament for Essex West and Hertfordshire East
- In office 9 June 1994 – 10 June 1999
- Preceded by: Constituency established
- Succeeded by: Constituency abolished

Personal details
- Born: 9 July 1944 (age 82) Hurlford, Scotland
- Party: Labour (1959–1998); SSP (1998–2006); Solidarity (2006–2011); SNP (2011–2016); Action for Independence (2021); Alba (2021–2025); Your Party (2025–2026); Liberate Scotland (2026-)
- Education: London School of Economics; University of Essex

Hugh Kerr (born 9 July 1944) is a Scottish politician and a former lecturer in social policy at the Polytechnic of North London. He was elected a Member of the European Parliament (MEP) from the Labour Party in June 1994, and represented the euro-constituency of Essex West & Hertfordshire East until 1999.

== Early life ==
Kerr was born in Hurlford, Scotland, and educated at Kilmarnock Academy. He subsequently studied at the London School of Economics and Essex University.

He then became a lecturer at the University of North London, with a specialism in European social policy. He joined the Labour Party and served on Harlow District Council.

== Political career ==
At the 1994 European Parliament election Kerr defeated the Conservative incumbent, Patricia Rawlings, and was elected as the MEP for Essex West & Hertfordshire East (then comprising the Westminster constituencies of Brentwood and Ongar, Broxbourne, Epping Forest, Harlow, Hertford and Stortford, North East Hertfordshire and Stevenage). In his speech on election night in June 1994, he chided Rawlings (now Baroness Rawlings of Burnham Westgate) for not attending any of the series of pre-election hustings throughout the euro-constituency where local issues had been debated by the other candidates in her absence.

Upon his election in 1994, Kerr based his euro-constituency office in the marginal constituency of Harlow providing support for the local Labour party and its nominee Bill Rammell. Kerr fell out with the New Labour government not long after the 1 May 1997 general election – when Rammell was elected as Harlow's MP – accusing the Prime Minister, Tony Blair, of "Stalinist tendencies" for planning to abolish all current euro-constituencies and for introducing a party list regional system for future European elections, and to stifle any criticism by Labour MEPs.

In a House of Commons debate on 27 November 1997, Kerr was quoted as saying that the gagging "shows that New Labour is increasingly authoritarian and centralised".

Kerr was suspended by the National Executive Committee and later expelled from the Labour Party along with fellow dissident Ken Coates MEP, with whom he then formed the Independent Labour Network. He left the Party of European Socialists and joined forces with The Green Group in the European Parliament, becoming the first Scottish Socialist Party (SSP) MEP. At the June 1999 European Parliament election, with voting on the basis of proportional representation throughout the United Kingdom, Kerr was at the top of the SSP's party list for Scotland's seven European seats but the party's share of the vote was too low to secure his re-election as an MEP.

== Later career ==
After a period living in Australia, Kerr returned to Scotland and worked as press officer to Tommy Sheridan MSP. In the May 2003 Scottish Parliamentary election, Kerr stood as an SSP candidate for the East Lothian constituency but gained only 1,380 votes (4.42%).

Kerr was no. 3 on the SSP's list of candidates at the June 2004 European Parliamentary Election, but it did not get any candidates elected. His share of the vote at the Kilmarnock and Loudoun constituency in the 2005 general election slumped to 1.9% (833 votes). Kerr resigned from the SSP in September 2006 to become the Press Officer of Solidarity, a new party led by Sheridan, but left the party in 2011 to join the Scottish National Party (SNP). He sought the SNP nomination in Kilmarnock and Loudoun in the 2015 general election but was unsuccessful in being selected.

Kerr resigned from the SNP in 2016, in protest against party leader Nicola Sturgeon holding a copy of the Scottish Sun newspaper. On 11 December 2019, one day before the UK general election, Kerr pleaded to the Scottish people to vote tactically for the SNP to “keep the Tories out of power”.

He was a defence witness in HM Advocate v Sheridan and Sheridan.

He currently writes on opera for Scottish arts website The Wee Review.

In March 2021 he joined the Alba Party. In 2025 he left Alba to join Jeremy Corbyn and Zarah Sultana's Your Party, describing Alba as a "dying" party "in its death throes" after it split over candidate selection and a police investigation into financial misconduct. Kerr noted that Your Party was his eighth party since joining Labour in 1959, but said this may be his last. He quit the party just four months later.

In preparation for the 2026 Scottish Parliament election, Kerr announced that he joined the Alliance to Liberate Scotland. He was third on the party list for the Edinburgh and Lothians East region, but was not elected.

Parliament of the United Kingdom
Preceded by Patricia Rawlings (for Essex South West)	Member of the European Parliament for Essex West & Hertfordshire East; 1994 – 1999	Constituency abolished (see East of England)
