= Essex North =

Essex North or North Essex may refer to:

== Canada ==
- Essex North (federal electoral district), a federal electoral district in Ontario, Canada 1883–1925
- Essex North (provincial electoral district), a provincial electoral district in Ontario, Canada 1875–1999

== England ==
- The northern part of Essex, a county in the East of England
- North Essex (UK Parliament constituency), a constituency of the British House of Commons, 1832–1868 and 1997–2010
- Essex North and Suffolk South (European Parliament constituency)
- Harwich and North Essex (UK Parliament constituency)
