= Patricia Rawlings, Baroness Rawlings =

British politician (born 1939)

The Right Honourable The Baroness Rawlings
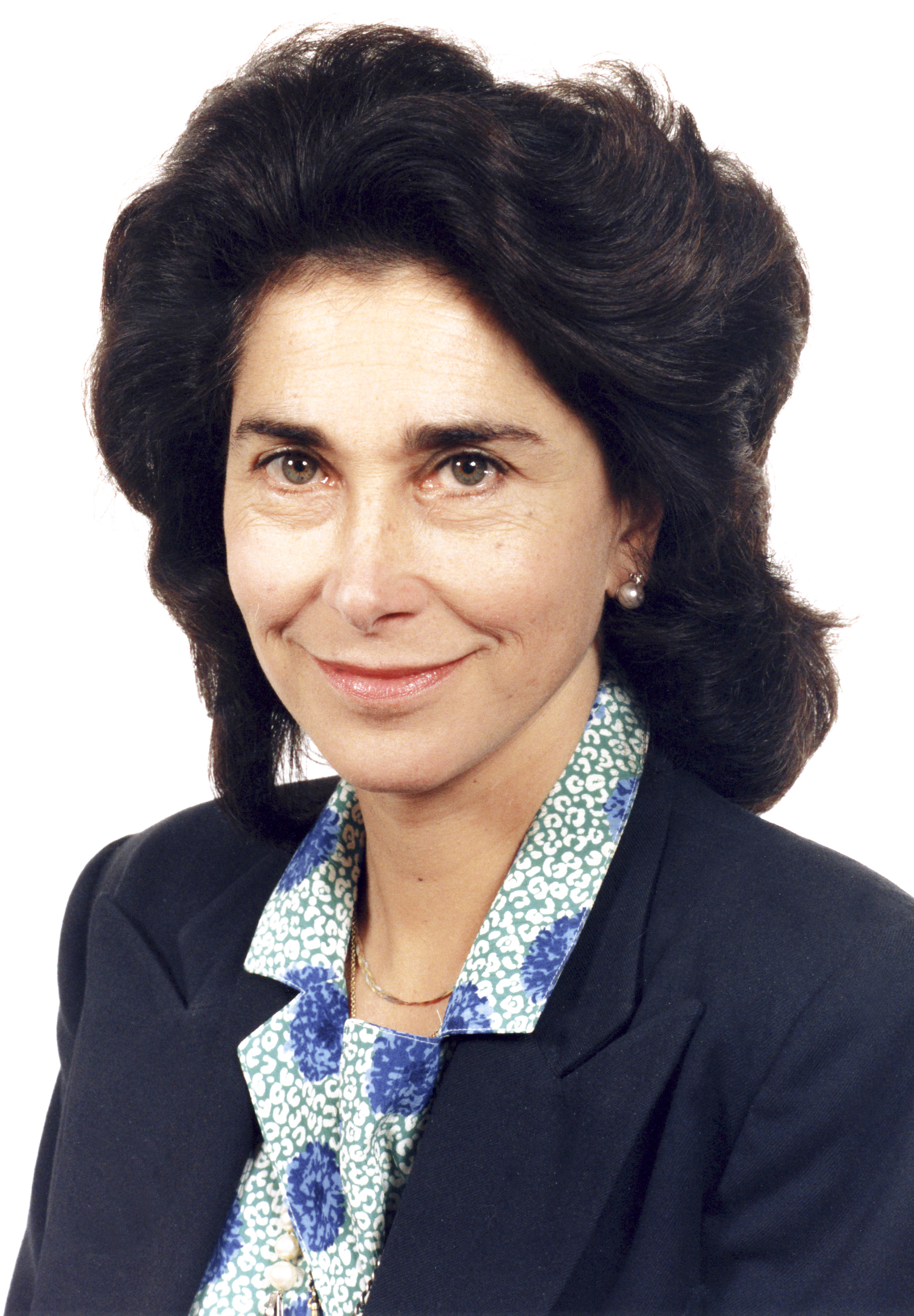
- Official MEP portrait

Baroness-in-waiting Government Whip
- In office 11 May 2010 – 25 June 2012
- Prime Minister: David Cameron
- Preceded by: The Baroness Crawley
- Succeeded by: The Lord Gardiner of Kimble

Member of the European Parliament for Essex South West
- In office 15 June 1989 – 9 June 1994
- Preceded by: Alexander Sherlock
- Succeeded by: Constituency abolished

Member of the House of Lords
- Lord Temporal
- Life peerage 5 October 1994

Personal details
- Born: 27 January 1939 (age 87)
- Party: Conservative
- Spouse: David Wolfson (m. 1962; div. 1967)
- Education: University College London

Patricia Elizabeth Rawlings, Baroness Rawlings, (born 27 January 1939) is a Conservative Party politician and former frontbencher in the House of Lords. She was also a Member of the European Parliament (MEP) from 1989 to 1994. She was Chairman of King's College London Council from 1998 to 2007, and was made a Fellow of King's College (FKC) in 2003. She was President of the National Council for Voluntary Organisations from 2002 to 2007, and President of the British Antique Dealers' Association 2005–2013. She is also a trustee of the Chevening Estate.

== Education ==
Rawlings was educated in the United Kingdom and Switzerland. She trained as a nurse at Westminster Hospital and is an active member of the British Red Cross (she was awarded the British Red Cross national Badge of Honour in 1987). She was a mature student at University College London and studied for a postgraduate diploma in International Relations from the London School of Economics. She was awarded an Hon DLitt from the University of Buckingham in 1998.

== Political career ==
Having unsuccessfully fought Sheffield Central in 1983 and Doncaster Central in 1987, Rawlings was elected at the 1989 European election as the MEP for Essex South West. That constituency was abolished for the 1994 European election when she was defeated by Labour's Hugh Kerr in the new Essex West and Hertfordshire East constituency.

She was created a life peer with the title Baroness Rawlings, of Burnham Westgate in the County of Norfolk on 5 October 1994 and entered the House of Lords where she held several frontbench positions. She served as an Opposition Whip (1997–1998), Spokesperson on Culture, Media and Sport (1997–1998), Foreign and Commonwealth Affairs (1998–2010) and International Development (1998–2010). Following the 2010 general election, she served as the Government Whip with responsibility for Culture, Media and Sport and for Scotland.

Baroness Rawlings retired from the government on 25 June 2012.

== Controversy ==
In 2002 Baroness Rawlings became involved in a controversy over a 1.8-acre (7,300 m2) piece of land, owned by King's College London, and formerly owned by St Thomas' Hospital. King's had instructed Jones Lang LaSalle to value the site, resulting in a valuation of £10 million. An offer to buy the land for up to £24 million came unexpectedly from the Aga Khan Development Network, causing opposition from St Thomas'. It was rumoured that Baroness Rawlings had engineered the unsolicited offer which she strenuously denied, saying that as Chairman of King's College London Council she knew absolutely nothing about any such bid. Baroness Rawlings insisted that it was a valuable part of the King's College London estate and that it should be sold to the highest bidder on the open market. The College eventually decided to retain the property.

== Personal life ==
Patricia Rawlings was married in 1962 to businessman David Wolfson, later Baron Wolfson of Sunningdale (1935-2021), but divorced in 1967; both partners held noble titles in their own right. She was the Honorary Secretary of Grillion's dining club, and a member of the Pilgrims Society.

She lives in Burnham Westgate Hall, a Sir John Soane-designed house in Burnham Market, Norfolk, with parkland of over 30 acres, which property was put up for sale in 2019 with a guide price of £3.8M. The house had been previously put up for sale by Baroness Rawlings, in 2011, with a price of £7M; Johnny Depp, the film actor, was said to want to buy the property at that time, but no sale occurred.

== Foreign orders and decorations ==
- In 1991 Patricia Rawlings is the first British woman to be awarded the Order of the Rose (Silver), which was bestowed upon her by President Zhelyu Zhelev of Bulgaria, in recognition of her interest in Bulgaria. Rawlings is permitted to wear the decoration whenever she visits Bulgaria or goes to the Bulgarian embassy.
- For services to Anglo-Brazilian relations, she was awarded the Grand Official, Order of the Southern Cross from the Republic of Brazil in 1998.

== Arms ==
Coat of arms of Patricia Rawlings, Baroness Rawlings
Coronet A Coronet of a Baroness Crest Out of a Ducal Coronet Or a Griffin's Head Azure gorged with a Bar Gemelle Gules between two Wings expanded of the second Escutcheon Quarterly barry wavy of six Argent and Azure and Argent on a Cross Gules between in the second and third quarters an Escallop Azure a Seax fesswise point to the sinister surmounted by an Ostrich Plume palewise Argent between in chief and in base a Bee Volant proper on a Bordure Azure twelve Mullets Or Supporters Dexter: a Lion rampant Or gorged with a Riband Azure pendant from the knot thereof a Rose Argent barbed and seeded proper; Sinister: an Elephant Ermine gorged with a Chain Or pendant therefrom a Portcullis Sable Motto Perserverantia, Integritas Et Fidelitas (Perseverance, integrity and loyalty)

Parliament of the United Kingdom
Preceded by Alexander Sherlock	Member of the European Parliament for Essex South West; 1989 – 1994	Constituency abolished (see Essex West & Hertfordshire East)
