= Independent Labour Network =

Defunct left wing political group in the United Kingdom

The Independent Labour Network was a left-wing political organisation in the United Kingdom.

It was founded in 1998 by MEPs Ken Coates and Hugh Kerr following their expulsion from the Labour Party. They stood candidates in the 1999 European Parliament election and were involved in setting up first local branches of the Socialist Alliance, then the national organisation. The Leeds North East Constituency Labour Party supported the ILN and as a result were threatened with disaffiliation from the Labour Party, many of its members forming the Leeds Left Alliance.

The organisation attracted few votes in the 1999 European Parliament election, and had disbanded by 2003.
