= John Ling =

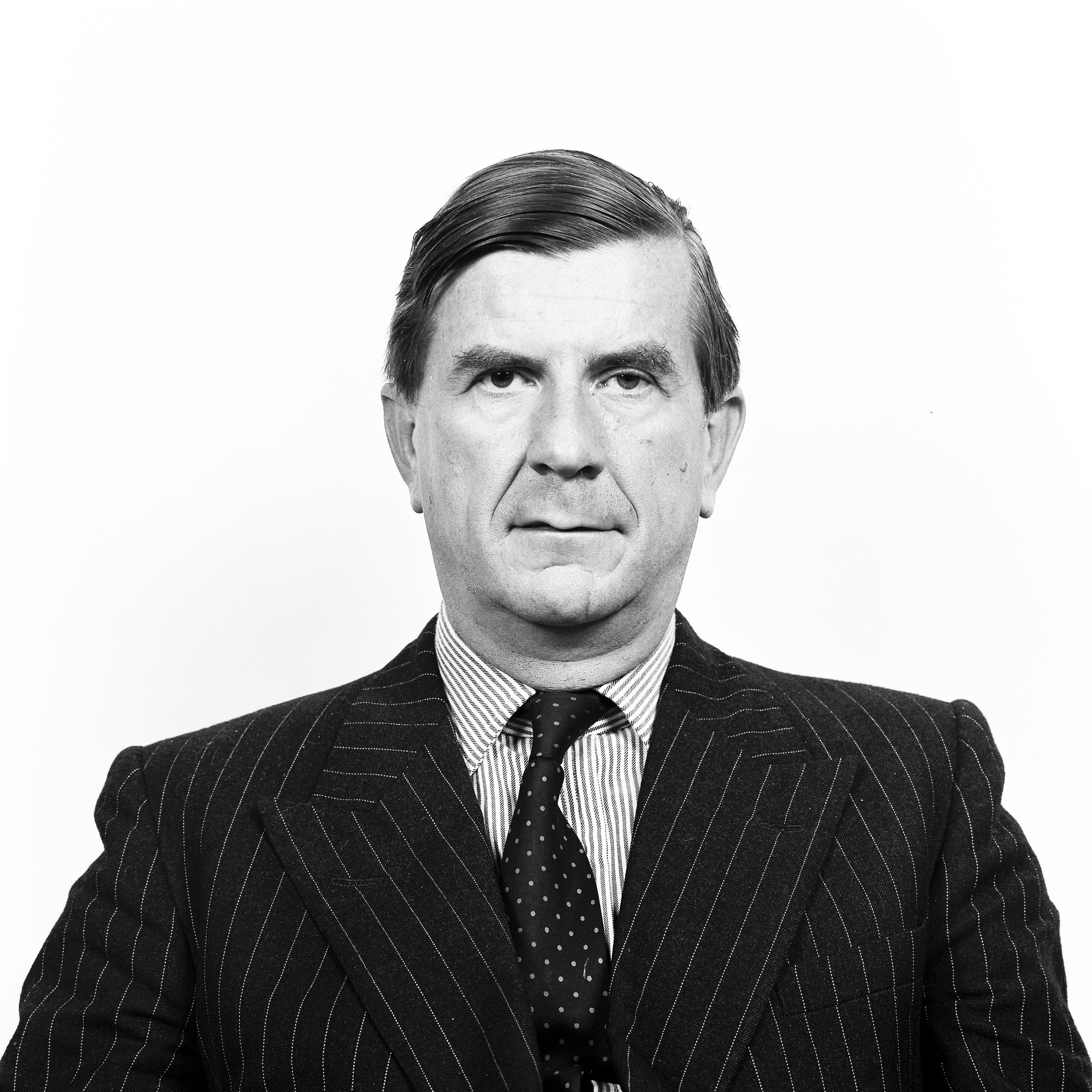
European Parliament portrait

John de Courcy Ling CBE (14 October 1933 – 10 November 2005) was a British diplomat, farmer, politician and writer. His Roman Catholic faith contributed to making him a strong internationalist who believed in overseas aid.

== Family and personal life ==
Born in Warwickshire, Ling was the son of Arthur Norman Ling, of Warwick, and of Veronica de Courcy, of Painestown, County Kildare, and was educated at King Edward's School, Birmingham followed by Clare College, Cambridge where he received his BA degree in 1955. Although Cambridge graduates are entitled to proceed to the degree of Master of Arts after passing nine terms, he did not collect his MA until 1981. He married the half-Canadian Jennifer Rosemary Haynes in 1959; the couple had a son (Adam) and three daughters (Julia, Tricia and Kate).

== Early career ==
Ling served his National Service as a second lieutenant in the Royal Ulster Rifles from 1956, and served as a lieutenant on active service in Cyprus from 1957 to 1958. On being demobilised he entered the Diplomatic Service and was the resident Deputy Middle Eastern Secretary at the Foreign Office in 1959. Following the usual Diplomatic Service practice of alternating postings in Whitehall with those in foreign embassies, he was private secretary to Ministers of State for Foreign Affairs, Lord Harlech and Joseph Godber from 1961 to 1963, and then Second Secretary at the embassy in Santiago from 1963 to 1966.

== Senior diplomatic posts ==
Promoted to First Secretary at the Nairobi embassy in 1966, Ling served three years before returning to the Rhodesia Department of the Foreign and Commonwealth Office in 1969. He transferred to the American Department in 1970 and became Assistant Head of the West African Department in 1971. His final postings were as chargé d'affaires at Chad in 1973, and then as Counsellor in Paris from 1974 to 1977. During this time he also became involved in managing farms at Henley and later a farm he inherited from his mother at Painestown.

== Political involvement ==
Following his resignation from the Diplomatic Service, Ling entered politics as a Conservative. His experience in Paris and with the Foreign Office had made him a pro-European and he was elected as a Member of the European Parliament for Midlands Central in 1979. He served as Chief Whip for the Conservative Group for four years and chaired the EU Parliamentary Delegation to Israel from 1979 to 1983. He was vice-chairman of the Development Aid Committee from 1984 until 1987. He was defeated in the 1989 elections by Christine Oddy.

Ling had previously served as a Member of the Council of Lloyd's of London from 1986 to 1988, and continued to be a member of the Catholic Bishops' Committee on Europe (to which he had been appointed in 1983) until 2001. He wrote for publications such as The Tablet and the Sunday Times, as well as books on the decline of empire and African famine. He was appointed Commander of the Order of the British Empire (CBE) in 1990.

== Sources ==
- The Times: 17 November 2005
