= Northamptonshire and Blaby (European Parliament constituency) =

Former European Parliament constituency

- European Parliament constituency
- Boundary within the East of England (1994-1999)
- Member state: United Kingdom
- Created: 1994
- Dissolved: 1999
- MEPs: 1

Northamptonshire and Blaby was a constituency of the European Parliament in the United Kingdom, established in 1994 as a single-member constituency and dissolved in 1999. Prior to the uniform adoption of proportional representation in 1999, the United Kingdom used first-past-the-post for the European elections in England, Scotland and Wales. The European Parliament constituencies used under that system were smaller than the later regional constituencies and only had one Member of the European Parliament each.

It consisted of the Westminster Parliament constituencies of Blaby, Corby, Daventry, Kettering, Northampton North, Northampton South, and Wellingborough.

== MEPs ==
Elected	Member	Party
1994	Angela Billingham	Labour
1999	Constituency abolished: see East Midlands	

== Results ==
1994 European Parliament election: Northamptonshire and Blaby
Party	Candidate	Votes	%	±%
Labour	Angela T. Billingham	95,317	46.1	
Conservative	Anthony M.H. Simpson	69,232	33.5	
Liberal Democrats	Kevin L. Scudder	27,616	13.4	
Green	Audrey T. Bryant	9,121	4.4	
Independent	E.P.I. (Ian) Whitaker	4,397	2.1	
Natural Law	Barry Spivack	972	0.5	
Majority		26,085	12.6	
Turnout		206,655		
Labour win (new seat)				
