= Anne McIntosh =

British Conservative politician

The Right Honourable The Baroness McIntosh of Pickering
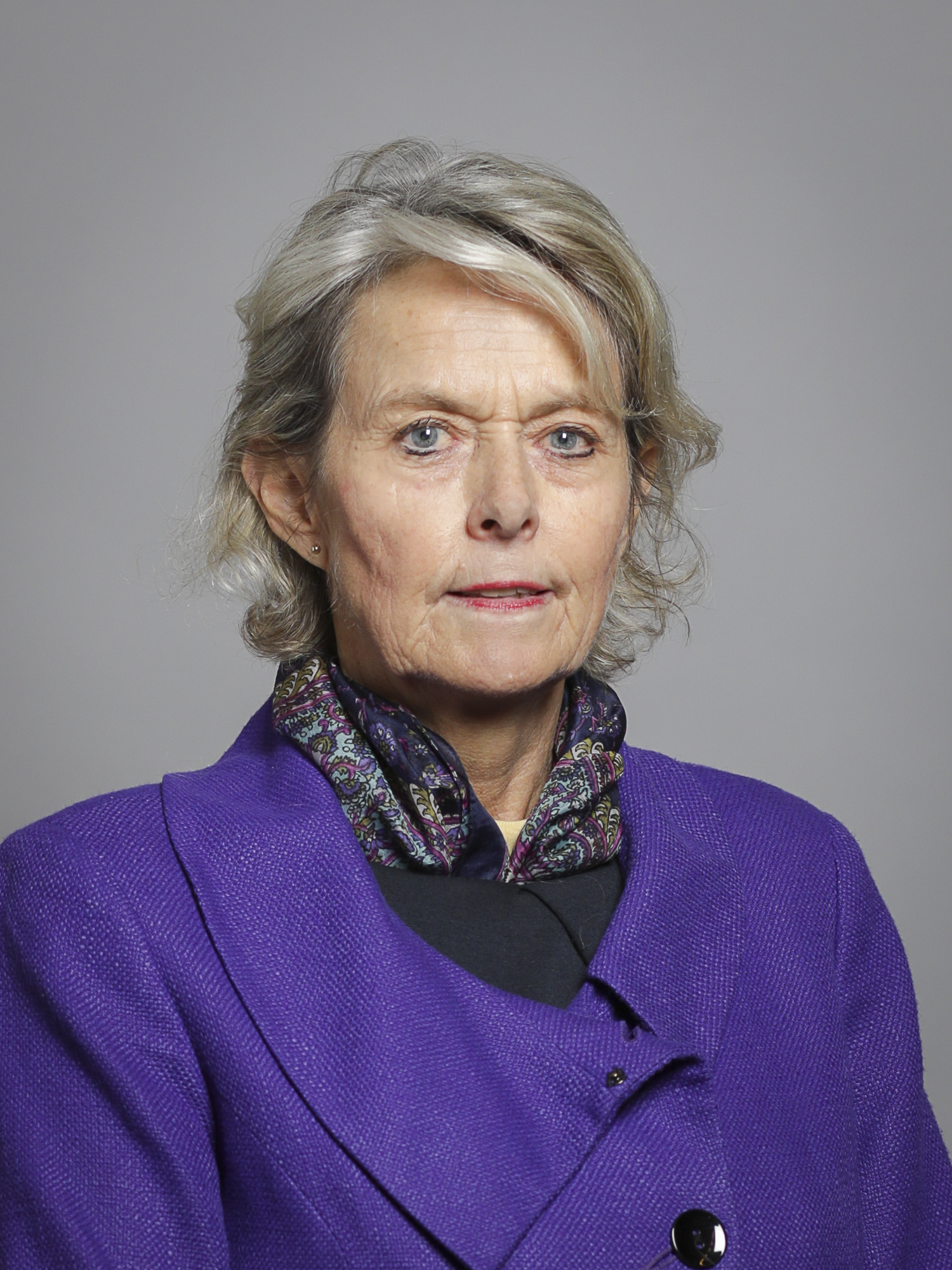
- Official portrait, 2019

Chair of the Environment, Food and Rural Affairs Select Committee
- In office 10 June 2010 – 30 March 2015
- Preceded by: Michael Jack
- Succeeded by: Neil Parish

Member of the House of Lords
- Lord Temporal
- Life peerage 6 October 2015

Member of Parliament for Thirsk and Malton Vale of York (1997–2010)
- In office 1 May 1997 – 30 March 2015
- Preceded by: Constituency established
- Succeeded by: Kevin Hollinrake

Member of the European Parliament for Essex North and Suffolk South Essex North East (1989–1994)
- In office 25 July 1989 – 20 July 1999
- Preceded by: David Curry
- Succeeded by: Constituency abolished

Personal details
- Born: 20 September 1954 (age 72) Edinburgh, Scotland
- Party: Conservative
- Spouse: John Harvey
- Education: University of Edinburgh
- Website: www.annemcintosh.org.uk

Anne Caroline Ballingall McIntosh, Baroness McIntosh of Pickering (born 20 September 1954) is a British politician who has been a life peer since 2015.

A member of the Conservative Party, McIntosh served as Member of Parliament (MP) for Thirsk and Malton from 2010 to 2015, having been the MP for Vale of York from 1997, as well as previously a Member of the European Parliament (MEP) from 1989 to 1999. McIntosh was not reselected by her Thirsk and Malton constituency association on 31 January 2014, although she continued to represent the Conservative Party in Parliament until the 2015 general election.

She was given a life peerage in the 2015 Dissolution Honours and created Baroness McIntosh of Pickering, of the Vale of York in the County of North Yorkshire, on 6 October 2015, and introduced into the House of Lords on 27 October.

== Early life ==
Born in Edinburgh, the daughter of a Scottish doctor father and Danish mother, Anne McIntosh was educated at Harrogate Ladies College in North Yorkshire and at the University of Edinburgh where she read law, graduating in 1977 as LLB. She also pursued post-graduate studies at the University of Aarhus in the Jutland region of Denmark.

In 1978, she became a trainee at the European Community (EEC) Competition Directorate, before joining Didier and Associates in Brussels in 1979 as a legal advisor. She trained for the Scottish Bar in Edinburgh from 1980, being admitted to the Faculty of Advocates in June 1982. She worked as an advocate with the Community Law Office in Brussels, before becoming a political advisor to the European Democrats group in the European Parliament in 1983 until 1989.

== European Parliament ==
After an unsuccessful attempt at a UK Parliamentary seat (1987 general election at Workington), where she was defeated by the sitting Labour MP Dale Campbell-Savours, McIntosh was elected for Essex North East at the 1989 European Parliament election and later for its successor seat of Essex North and Suffolk South at the 1994 election. She served as a Member of the European Parliament until she stood down at the 1999 elections.

== Member of Parliament ==
=== MP for Vale of York (1997-2010) ===
McIntosh was elected to the House of Commons in the 1997 general election for the Vale of York which she won by a comfortable 9,721 majority and held the seat without difficulty until it was abolished in 2010. She was promoted to the Opposition frontbench in 2001 as Spokesperson for Culture, Media and Sport and has since held a number of front bench positions including Transport (2003–2005), Foreign Affairs (2005), Work and Pensions (2005–2007), and Environment, Food and Rural Affairs (2007–2010), though never at Shadow Cabinet level. McIntosh was elected as Chairman of the Environment, Food and Rural Affairs Select Committee in 2010. In 2014 she received wide acclaim for her "robust chairmanship" and "tackling the establishment head on".

After boundary changes agreed in 2006, the Vale of York constituency was divided up leaving no obvious successor; the seat most closely associated was Thirsk and Malton which was the successor to Ryedale, held since 1987 by John Greenway. McIntosh and Greenway went head-to-head for the newly created seat. On 18 November 2006, the newly formed Thirsk and Malton Conservative Association chose McIntosh as their candidate for the ensuing general election.

==== Expenses ====
Following an inquiry by Sir Thomas Legg into parliamentary expenses, Anne McIntosh was asked to repay £948. In her statement, she welcomed the lead in expenses reform from David Cameron, despite being one of only 21 Conservative MPs to vote against expenses reform on 4 July 2008.

=== MP for Thirsk and Malton (2010-15) ===
Following the death of UK Independence Party candidate John Boakes, the 2010 election in Thirsk and Malton was delayed until 27 May, some three weeks after the rest of the country. McIntosh won being returned to Parliament with a majority of 11,281.

After the 2010 election, McIntosh was not appointed a Minister from her shadow portfolio, but was elected Chair of the Environment, Food and Rural Affairs Select Committee. She was also elected Chair of the all-party parliamentary groups on Denmark, South Africa, Water, Floods and Environmental Quality.

As Chairman of the EFRA Committee, McIntosh has worked on: the EU Council Directive on the Welfare of Laying Hens, EU Common Fisheries Policy, the Farming in the Uplands Report and the CAP after 2013 report.

During 2010/11, McIntosh had been campaigning for the reopening of Ryedale Ward at Malton Community Hospital following its temporary closure as part of a pilot scheme. McIntosh secured an adjournment debate in the House of Commons on 17 November 2010 on the decision-making processes for closing hospital wards. In the run up to the budget, McIntosh tried to campaign for both a fair fuel stabilizer and a remote rural fuel duty rebate for North Yorkshire. Although McIntosh secured a debate, which took place on Tuesday 15 February, on introducing a potential fuel duty stabilizer and rebate for remote rural areas, it did not feature in the Budget. McIntosh had campaigned for the safety of some constituents living along the A64. She had been campaigning for better road safety and road speed measures in the local villages of Rillington, East Heslerton and West Heslerton.

=== Issues with local party and deselection ===
In August 2009, the local Conservative Party attempted to deselect McIntosh as their Parliamentary Candidate. McIntosh won the vote, which was held in Malton. Following this, she was elected as the new MP for Thirsk and Malton.

In January 2013, it was reported that the Conservative local party 'Executive Committee' had voted not to reselect McIntosh automatically as the Parliamentary Candidate for the next general election.

On 31 January 2014, it was announced that McIntosh had lost a vote of confidence, and therefore was not reselected and would not be the Conservative candidate in Thirsk and Malton at the next election.

Following the result, Conservative Home speculated that McIntosh might stand as an Independent candidate in 2015. In March 2015 McIntosh publicly announced that she would not be standing as an independent and would be standing down from Parliament as Member of Parliament for Thirsk and Malton in May 2015.

== Career in the Lords ==
McIntosh was given a life peerage in the 2015 Dissolution Honours and created Baroness McIntosh of Pickering, of the Vale of York in the County of North Yorkshire, on 6 October. Since October 2015, she has sat in the House of Lords.

== Personal life ==
Anne McIntosh married John Harvey in September 1992 in County Durham, and they have a house in the constituency near to Thirsk.

An accomplished linguist, she speaks six languages: English, Danish, French, German, Italian and Spanish.

== See also ==
- Clan Mackintosh

Parliament of the United Kingdom
New constituency	Member of Parliament for Vale of York; 1997–2010	Constituency abolished
New constituency	Member of Parliament for Thirsk and Malton; 2010–2015	Succeeded by Kevin Hollinrake
