= Stoke Park School =

Location
- Dane Road; Coventry, West Midlands, CV2 4JW; England
- Coordinates: 52.4134°N 1.4747°W

Information
- Type: Academy
- Established: 1919
- Local authority: Coventry City Council
- Trust: The Futures Trust
- Department for Education URN: 145179 Tables
- Ofsted: Reports
- Gender: Coeducational
- Age: 11 to 18
- Website: http://www.stokepark.coventry.sch.uk/

Stoke Park School is a coeducational secondary school and sixth form located in Coventry, West Midlands, England.

It was established in 1919 as a grammar school, but later became comprehensive. Previously a foundation school and Technology College administered by Coventry City Council, in October 2017 Stoke Park School converted to academy status. The school is now sponsored by The Futures Trust.

Stoke Park School offers GCSEs and BTECs as programmes of study for pupils, while students in the sixth form have the option to study from a range of A Levels, Cambridge Technicals and further BTECs.

== Notable former pupils ==
- Cal Crutchlow, motorcyclist
- Marcus Hall, former footballer
- Guz Khan, comedian
- Christine Oddy, politician
- Pa Salieu, rapper
