= Essex South (European Parliament constituency) =

Former European Parliament constituency

- European Parliament constituency
- Boundary within the East of England (1994-1999)
- Member state: United Kingdom
- Created: 1994
- Dissolved: 1999
- MEPs: 1

Essex South was a constituency of the European Parliament located in the United Kingdom, electing one member of the European Parliament by the first-past-the-post electoral system. Created in 1994 from parts of Essex South West and Essex North East, it was abolished in 1999 on the adoption of proportional representation for European elections in England, Scotland and Wales. It was succeeded by the East of England region.

== Boundaries ==
It consisted of the parliamentary constituencies of Basildon, Billericay, Castle Point, Rochford, Southend East, Southend West and Thurrock. Basildon, Billericay and Thurrock had previously been part of Essex South West while Castle Point, Southend East, Southend West and much of Rochford had been part of Essex North East.

The entire area became part of the East of England constituency in 1999.

== MEPs ==
Election	Member	Party
part of Essex South West and Essex North East prior to 1994
1994	Richard Howitt	Labour
1999	constituency abolished, part of East of England from 1999	

== Election results ==
1994 European Parliament election in the United Kingdom: Essex South
Party	Candidate	Votes	%	±%
Labour	Richard Howitt	71,883	44.6	
Conservative	Lionel Stanbrook	50,516	31.3	
Liberal Democrats	Geoff Williams	26,132	16.2	
Liberal	Brian Lynch	6,780	4.2	
Green	George Rumens	4,691	2.9	
Natural Law	Mark Heath	1,177	0.7	
Majority		21,367	13.3	
Turnout		161,179		
Labour win (new seat)				
