= London East (European Parliament constituency) =

Former European Parliament constituency

- European Parliament constituency
- Boundary within London (1979-1984)
- Member state: United Kingdom
- Created: 1979
- Dissolved: 1999
- MEPs: 1

Prior to its uniform adoption of proportional representation in 1999, the United Kingdom used first-past-the-post for the European elections in England, Scotland and Wales. The European Parliament constituencies used under that system were smaller than the later regional constituencies and only had one Member of the European Parliament each.

The constituency of London East was one of them.

It consisted of the Westminster Parliament constituencies of Barking, Dagenham, Hornchurch, Ilford North, Ilford South, Newham North East, Romford, Upminster, and Wanstead and Woodford.

Boundary within South East England and London (1984-1994)

Boundary within South East England and London (1994-1999)

== Members of the European Parliament ==
Elected	Member	Party
1979	Alan Tyrrell	Conservative
1984	Carole Tongue	Labour
1989	Carole Tongue	Labour
1994	Carole Tongue	Labour
1999	Constituency abolished: see London	

== Election results ==
European Parliament election, 1979: London East
Party	Candidate	Votes	%	±%
Conservative	Alan Tyrrell	77,955	48.8	N/A
Labour	Peter D. O'Neill	64,925	40.7	N/A
Liberal	D. C. Blackburn	16,783	10.5	N/A
Majority		13,030	8.2	N/A
Turnout		159,663	29.5	N/A
Conservative win (new seat)				

European Parliament election, 1984: London East
Party	Candidate	Votes	%	±%
Labour	Carole Tongue	73,870	45.6	▲4.9
Conservative	Alan Tyrrell	61,711	38.1	▼10.7
SDP	Mrs. Jackie Horne	26,379	16.3	▲5.8
Majority		12,159	7.5	▼0.7
Turnout		161,960	30.1	▲0.6
Labour gain from Conservative		Swing	▲7.8	

European Parliament election, 1989: London East
Party	Candidate	Votes	%	±%
Labour	Carole Tongue	92,803	49.5	▲3.8
Conservative	Alan Tyrrell	65,418	34.9	▼3.2
Green	Miss E. M. (Liz) Crosbie	21,388	11.4	N/A
SLD	John K. Gibb	7,341	3.9	▼12.4
International Communist	D. A. O’Sullivan	717	0.4	N/A
Majority		27,385	14.6	▲7.1
Turnout		187,667	35.4	▲5.3
Labour hold		Swing	▲3.5	

European Parliament election, 1994: London East
Party	Candidate	Votes	%	±%
Labour	Carole Tongue	98,759	57.8	▲8.4
Conservative	Mrs. Virginia F. M. Taylor	41,370	24.2	▼10.6
Liberal Democrats	W. K. (Ken) Montgomery	15,566	9.1	▲5.2
UKIP	Gerard Batten	5,974	3.5	N/A
Green	John M. Baguley	4,337	2.5	▼8.9
National Liberal	Oliver S. Tillett	3,484	2.0	N/A
Natural Law	Nigel D. Kahn	1,272	0.8	N/A
Majority		57,389	33.6	▲19.0
Turnout		170,762	38.0	▲2.6
Labour hold		Swing	▲9.5	
