= Essex West and Hertfordshire East (European Parliament constituency) =

Former European Parliament constituency

- European Parliament constituency
- Boundary within the East of England (1994-1999)
- Member state: United Kingdom
- Created: 1994
- Dissolved: 1999
- MEPs: 1

Essex West and Hertfordshire East was a constituency of the European Parliament located in the United Kingdom, electing one Member of the European Parliament by the first-past-the-post electoral system. Created in 1994 from parts of Hertfordshire and Essex South West, it was abolished in 1999 on the adoption of proportional representation for European elections in England, Scotland and Wales. It was succeeded by the East of England region.

== Boundaries ==
It consisted of the parliamentary constituencies of Brentwood and Ongar, Broxbourne, Chelmsford, Epping Forest, Harlow, Hertford and Stortford and Stevenage. Broxbourne, Hertford and Stortford and Stevenage had previously been part of Hertfordshire constituency, while Brentwood and Ongar, Chelmsford, Epping Forest and Harlow had been part of Essex South West.

The entire area became part of the East of England constituency in 1999.

== MEPs ==
| Election | Member | Party |
|---|---|---|
part of Hertfordshire and Essex South West prior to 1994
| 1994 | Hugh Kerr | Labour |
| 1998 | Hugh Kerr | Scottish Socialist Party |
| 1999 | constituency abolished, part of East of England from 1999 | |

== Election results ==
European Parliament election, 1994: Essex West and Hertfordshire East
| Party | Candidate | Votes | % | ±% |
|---|---|---|---|---|
| Labour | Hugh Kerr | 66,379 | 36.2 | |
| Conservative | Patricia Elizabeth Rawlings | 63,312 | 34.5 | |
| Liberal Democrats | Georgina James | 35,695 | 19.5 | |
| Independent; For a Sovereign Britain | Bryan Smalley | 10,277 | 5.6 | |
| Green | Felicity Mawson | 5,632 | 3.1 | |
| Independent; Sportsman | Peter Carter | 1,127 | 0.6 | |
| Natural Law | Leslie Davis | 1,026 | 0.6 | |
| Majority | | 3,067 | 1.7 | |
| Turnout | | 183,448 | 36.4 | |
| Labour win (new seat) | | | | |
