= Essex North East (European Parliament constituency) =

Former European Parliament constituency

- European Parliament constituency
- Boundary within the East of England (1979-1984)
- Member state: United Kingdom
- Created: 1979
- Dissolved: 1994
- MEPs: 1

Essex North East was a constituency of the European Parliament located in the United Kingdom, electing one Member of the European Parliament by the first-past-the-post electoral system. Created in 1979 for the first elections to the European Parliament, it was abolished in 1994 and succeeded by the constituencies of Essex North and Suffolk South and Essex South.

== Boundaries ==
On its creation in 1979, it consisted of the parliamentary constituencies of Braintree, Colchester, South East Essex, Maldon, Saffron Walden, Southend East and Southend West.

Boundary within the East of England (1984-1994)

After the 1984 boundary changes based on the new UK parliamentary constituencies created in 1983, it consisted of Braintree, Harwich, North Colchester, Rochford, Saffron Walden, South Colchester and Maldon, Southend East and Southend West. Harwich had previously been part of the Suffolk constituency.

The constituency was abolished in 1994. Braintree, Harwich, North Colchester, Saffron Walden and South Colchester and Maldon became part of Essex North and Suffolk South. Rochford, Southend East and Southend West were now part of the new constituency of Essex South.

== MEPs ==
Election	Member	Party
1979	David Curry	Conservative
1989	Anne McIntosh	Conservative
1994	constituency abolished, part of Essex North and Suffolk South and Essex South from 1994	

== Election results ==
European Parliament election, 1989: Essex North East
Party	Candidate	Votes	%	±%
Conservative	Anne Caroline Ballingall McIntosh	92,758	44.5	−11.1
Labour	Hilary J Bryan	53,360	25.6	+1.1
Green	Chris R Keene	45,163	21.7	New
SLD	Diana P Wallis	16,939	8.1	−11.8
Majority		39,398	18.9	−12.2
Turnout		215,220	34.8	+4.4
Conservative hold		Swing	−12.2	

European Parliament election, 1984: Essex North East
Party	Candidate	Votes	%	±%
Conservative	David Maurice Curry	97,138	55.6	−5.1
Labour	Brian L Stapleton	42,836	24.5	+4.0
SDP	Aubrey E Ross	34,769	19.9	+3.8
Majority		54,300	31.1	−9.1
Turnout		174,743	30.4	−2.1
Conservative hold		Swing	−4.6	

European Parliament election, 1979: Essex North East
Party	Candidate	Votes	%	±%
Conservative	David Maurice Curry	99,137	60.7	
Labour	Conor O. O'Brien	33,496	20.5	
Liberal	A W Phillips	26,298	16.1	
UACM	W O Smedley	4,497	2.8	
Majority		65,641	40.2	
Turnout		163,428	32.5	
Conservative win (new seat)				
