= Alan Tyrrell =

British lawyer and politician (1933–2014)

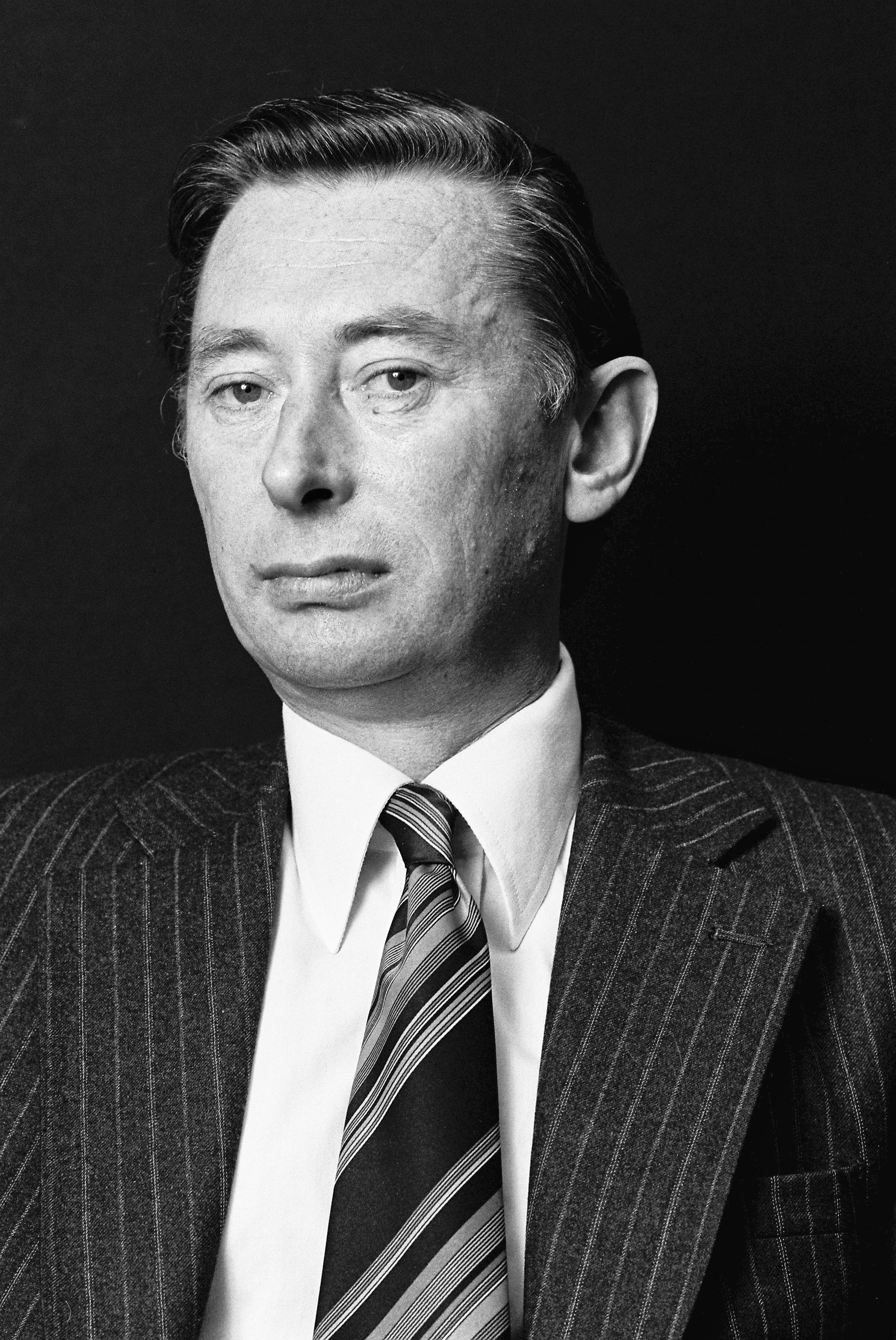
European Parliament portrait

Alan Rupert Tyrrell, QC (27 June 1933 – 23 October 2014) was a British lawyer and Conservative Party politician.

== Biography ==
Alan Tyrrell was born on 27 June 1933 in the Belgian Congo where his parents Trevor Tyrrell and Winifred Mackenzie were missionaries. He studied law at the London School of Economics and qualified as a barrister with the Gray's Inn Bar Association in 1956. He was made a Queen's Counsel in 1976, and appeared in a number of controversial cases.

Tyrrell was elected as Conservative member of the European Parliament for London East in 1979, but lost his seat in 1984, and was defeated again in 1989.

Tyrrell later became a deputy high court judge. He died on 23 October 2014, at the age of 81.
