= Carole Tongue =

Carole Tongue FRSA
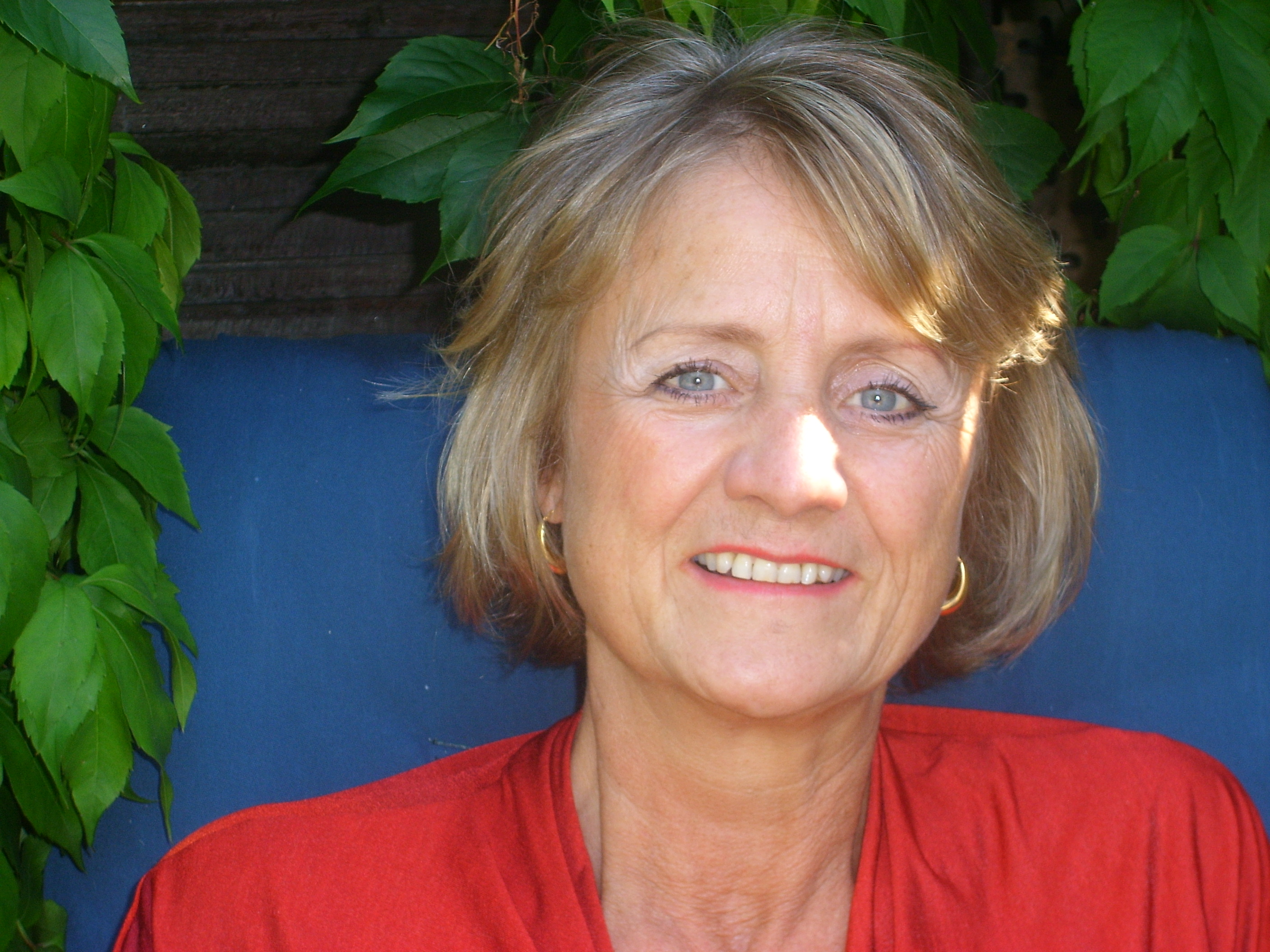
- Tongue in 2012

Member of the European Parliament for London East
- In office 14 June 1984 – 9 June 1999
- Preceded by: Alan Tyrrell
- Succeeded by: Constituency abolished

Personal details
- Born: 14 October 1955 (age 71)
- Party: None
- Other political affiliations: Change UK (2019–2020); Labour (until 2019)
- Education: Loughborough University

Carole Tongue, FRSA (born 14 October 1955) is a former Member of the European Parliament for London East (from 1984 to 1999) and Deputy Leader of the European Parliamentary Labour Party (from 1989 to 1991).

== Early life ==
Tongue was educated at Brentwood County High School and Loughborough University. She worked as an administrative assistant, then for the secretariat of the Socialist Group, also spending time as an editor, a courier and a guide.

== Responsibilities in the European Parliament ==
In the European Parliament, Carole was elected to be Deputy Leader of the European Parliamentary Labour Party 1989-1991. As a member of the Economic and Monetary Committee (1989–1994), she wrote two reports, overwhelmingly adopted, on the future of the European car industry. She founded the first ever European Car Industry Forum with the EU Commission and participation of all relevant stakeholders i.e. trades unions. It culminated in the Forum on the EU Automobile Industry meeting of 1 March 1994. One of its recommendations led to the establishment of Objective 5 of the European Social Fund designed to assist in the re-training of workers threatened with redundancy. From 1994 to 1999, she was Coordinator for the Socialist Group on Culture, Media, Sport, Education and Youth. She was also spokesperson on public service broadcasting. In this role, in 1995, she established a TV/Film consortium of trades unions and creators' organisations. In 1996, the Parliament adopted her Report on Public Service Broadcasting in the Multichannel Digital Age. This led to the inclusion of a protocol protecting public service broadcasting in the 1997 EU Amsterdam Treaty. In 1997, British Prime Minister Tony Blair appointed her to liaise between the European Parliamentary Labour Party and the UK Department for Culture, Media and Sport. From 1997 to 1999, she was the elected Chair of the European Parliament Cinema and Audiovisual Intergroup.

== Post-parliamentary career ==
Since leaving the European Parliament, she has worked in public affairs advising companies, not-for-profit and public sector organisations, including: universities, charities, NGOs and trades unions. An expert in audiovisual policy, she is currently advising trades unions and rights holders in the creative industries. Tongue has had a long involvement in the arts and creative industries. In 1999, she co-produced The Fleeting Opera on the River Thames with the Couper Collection and the Royal Opera House, Covent Garden. She has an extensive record of public service and campaigning in the areas of audiovisual and cultural diversity of expressions; media plurality; anti-discrimination; equality.

Carole is Chair of the UK Coalition for the Diversity of Cultural Expressions since 2005 when she founded the Coalition with Holy Aylett to implement the 2005 UNESCO Convention on the protection and promotion of the diversity of cultural expressions. She was appointed President of the European Coalitions for Diversity of Cultural Expressions in December 2014. In 2015, she founded and chaired Creatives4Europe, an organisation representing all branches of the creative industries/arts and culture (under the auspices of the European Movement) to campaign for a Remain vote in the 2016 EU membership referendum. As of March 2026 Carole is Co-President of London4Europe.

Along with prominent Labour Party members disillusioned with the Eurosceptic stance of the Corbyn leadership, she decided to stand for Change UK in the 2019 European Elections. She rejoined the Labour Party at end of 2019.

== Public service appointments ==
In 2005, she co-founded and now co-directs the UK Coalition for Cultural Diversity In 2014, she was elected Chair of the EU Coalitions for Cultural Diversity. In this role in March 2023 in the European Parliament, she chaired the first European Forum on Discoverability and in November 2023 she chaired a Forum on AI and Discoverability, also held in the European Parliament, Brussels.

January 2010: Appointed to the Investigation and Registration Committee of the GMC. 2006–2010: Member of the Communications and Information Committee of UNESCO National Commission.

2002–2006: Chair of the London Regional Awards Committee of the Community Fund and Member of the National Board of the Community Fund, distributing money raised by the UK National Lottery for good causes.

2001–2006: Professional Conduct Committee of the General Medical Council (GMC).

Tongue is also: Patron of the Arts For All charity; Patron of the Federal Trust and Chair of the Independent Film Parliament. She is also on the Board of the European Media Initiative campaigning for media plurality.

== Academic roles ==
2001-2011 Visiting Lecturer/Professor in European Audiovisual Policy and British and European Politics at London's University of the Arts

2008-2010 Visiting Lecturer at City University, London, on Cultural Diversity, Arts and Media

== Audiovisual policy and strategy ==
In the 1990s, Tongue campaigned for an EU Protocol to protect public service broadcasting. This protocol defending public service broadcasting was introduced into the 1997 EU Amsterdam Treaty. She also worked for an EU law to defend TV programming reflecting local culture, values and identity. These were enacted despite considerable opposition from certain commercial interests.

During this time, she argued for greater investment in British film, drama and documentary by cable and satellite channels such as BSkyB. She continues to work for cultural diversity of expression and media pluralism.

Tongue advises on audiovisual matters for film production companies. Fluent in French and German, she regularly speaks on broadcasting and film worldwide and is an author of articles and book chapters on European audiovisual policy, public service broadcasting, cultural policy and European affairs. She was a Member of the UNESCO National Committee on Communication and Information from 2002 to 2010.

== Honours, awards and memberships ==
In 2005, Tongue was awarded an honorary doctorate from the University of Lincoln for services to public service in broadcasting and audiovisual sectors.

In June 2022 Carole was awarded the Beaumarchais Medal for services to cultural diversity and author's rights by the French Society for Dramatic Authors (SACD).

She is a Fellow of the Royal Society for the Encouragement of Arts, Manufactures and Commerce (RSA), a member of the BECTU trade union. She is a Member of BAFTA.
