= Essex North and Suffolk South (European Parliament constituency) =

Former European Parliament constituency

- European Parliament constituency
- Boundary within the East of England (1994-1999)
- Member state: United Kingdom
- Created: 1994
- Dissolved: 1999
- MEPs: 1

Essex North and Suffolk South was a constituency of the European Parliament located in the United Kingdom, electing one Member of the European Parliament by the first-past-the-post electoral system. Created in 1994 from parts of Essex North East and Suffolk, it was abolished in 1999 on the adoption of proportional representation for European elections in Great Britain. It was succeeded by the East of England region.

== Boundaries ==
It consisted of the parliamentary constituencies of Braintree, Harwich, North Colchester, Saffron Walden, South Colchester and Maldon, and South Suffolk. Braintree, North Colchester and South Colchester and Maldon had previously been part of Essex North East, while Harwich, Saffron Walden and South Suffolk had been part of the Suffolk constituency.

The entire area became part of the East of England constituency in 1999.

== MEPs ==
Election	Member	Party
Essex North East and Suffolk prior to 1994
1994	Anne McIntosh	Conservative
1999	constituency abolished, East of England from 1999	

== Election results ==
1994 European Parliament election in the United Kingdom: Essex North and Suffolk South
Party	Candidate	Votes	%	±%
Conservative	Anne Caroline Ballingall McIntosh	68,311	33.2	
Labour	Christopher Alan Pearson	64,678	31.5	
Liberal Democrats	Stuart Mole	52,536	25.6	
Independent; Anti European Superstate	Somerset de Chair	12,409	6.0	
Green	Jim Abbott	6,641	3.2	
Natural Law	Nick Pullen	884	0.4	
Majority		3,633	1.7	
Turnout		205,459	41.3	
Conservative win (new seat)				
