= Birmingham East (European Parliament constituency) =

Former European Parliament constituency

- European Parliament constituency
- Boundary within the West Midlands (1984-1994)
- Member state: United Kingdom
- Created: 1984
- Dissolved: 1999
- MEPs: 1

Sources
- United Kingdom Election Results

Prior to its uniform adoption of proportional representation in 1999, the United Kingdom used first-past-the-post for the European elections in England, Scotland and Wales. The European Parliament constituencies used under that system were smaller than the later regional constituencies and only had one Member of the European Parliament each.

The constituency of Birmingham East was one of them.

It consisted of the Westminster Parliament constituencies of Birmingham Edgbaston, Birmingham Erdington, Birmingham Hall Green, Birmingham Hodge Hill, Birmingham Northfield, Birmingham Selly Oak, Birmingham Small Heath, Birmingham Sparkbrook, and Birmingham Yardley.

Boundary within the West Midlands (1994-1999)

== MEPs ==
Election	Member	Party
1984	Christine Crawley	Labour
1999	Constituency abolished: see West Midlands	

== Elections ==
European elections 1984: Birmingham East
Party	Candidate	Votes	%	±%
Labour	Christine Crawley	76,377	49.4	
Conservative	Norvela F Forster	54,994	35.5	
SDP	David A Bennett	21,927	14.2	
Independent	DC Howlett	1,440	0.9	
Majority		21,383	13.9	
Turnout		154,738	28.2	
Labour win (new seat)				

European elections 1989: Birmingham East
Party	Candidate	Votes	%	±%
Labour	Christine Crawley	96,588	53.7	+4.3
Conservative	Malcolm Harbour	49,640	27.6	−7.9
Green	Phil M. Simpson	22,589	12.6	New
SDP	Joe C. Binns	5,424	3.0	−11.2'"`UNIQ−−ref−00000015−QINU`"'
Liberal Democrats	Jerry Roodhouse	4,010	2.2	−12.0
National Front	Martin Wingfield	1,471	0.8	New
Majority		46,948	26.1	+12.2
Turnout		179,722	33.8	+4.6
Labour hold		Swing		

European elections 1994: Birmingham East
Party	Candidate	Votes	%	±%
Labour	Christine Crawley	90,291	58.2	+4.5
Conservative	Andrew Turner	35,171	22.7	−4.9
Liberal Democrats	Charlotte KB Cane	19,455	12.6	+10.4
Green	Phil M Simpson	6,268	4.0	−8.6
Socialist (GB)	Ron Cook	1,969	1.3	New
Natural Law	Marcus JB Brierley	1,885	1.2	New
Majority		55,120	35.5	+9.4
Turnout		155,039	29.8	−4.0
Labour hold		Swing		
