= Midlands Central (European Parliament constituency) =

Former European Parliament constituency

- European Parliament constituency
- Boundary within the West Midlands (1979-1984)
- Member state: United Kingdom
- Created: 1979
- Dissolved: 1994
- MEPs: 1

Prior to its uniform adoption of proportional representation in 1999, the United Kingdom used first-past-the-post for the European elections in England, Scotland and Wales. The European Parliament constituencies used under that system were smaller than the later regional constituencies and only had one Member of the European Parliament each.

The constituency of Midlands Central was one of them.

From 1979 to 1984, it consisted of the Westminster Parliament constituencies of Coventry North East, Coventry North West, Coventry South East, Coventry South West, Solihull, Stratford-on-Avon, and Warwick and Leamington. From 1984 until its abolition in 1994 it consisted of Coventry North East, Coventry North West, Coventry South East, Coventry South West, Meriden, Rugby and Kenilworth, Solihull, and Warwick and Leamington.

Boundary within the West Midlands (1984-1994)

== Members of the European Parliament ==
| Elected | Name | Party |
|---|---|---|
| 1979 | John Ling | Conservative |
| 1989 | Christine Oddy | Labour |
| 1994 | Constituency abolished | |

== Results ==
European Parliament election, 1979: Midlands Central
| Party | Candidate | Votes | % | ±% |
|---|---|---|---|---|
| Conservative | John Ling | 94,606 | 57.9 | |
| Labour | D.V. Hunt | 46,557 | 28.5 | |
| Liberal | Mrs. Valerie M. Davis | 15,859 | 9.7 | |
| Ecology | K.M. Benfield | 6,380 | 3.9 | |
| Majority | | 48,049 | 29.4 | |
| Turnout | | 163,402 | 34.0 | |
| Conservative win (new seat) | | | | |

European Parliament election, 1984: Midlands Central
| Party | Candidate | Votes | % | ±% |
|---|---|---|---|---|
| Conservative | John Ling | 67,884 | 44.5 | −13.4 |
| Labour Co-op | David J. Blackman | 55,155 | 36.2 | +7.7 |
| SDP | Patrick J. Langmead | 27,912 | 18.3 | +8.6 |
| Federal Republican Party | A.D. Enstone | 1,494 | 1.0 | New |
| Majority | | 12,729 | 8.3 | −21.1 |
| Turnout | | 152,445 | 28.6 | −7.4 |
| Conservative hold | | Swing | | |

European Parliament election, 1989: Midlands Central
| Party | Candidate | Votes | % | ±% |
|---|---|---|---|---|
| Labour | Christine Oddy | 76,736 | 38.5 | +2.3 |
| Conservative | John Ling | 71,643 | 35.9 | −8.6 |
| Green | Mrs. Janet A. Alty | 42,622 | 21.4 | New |
| SLD | Ian Cundy | 8,450 | 4.2 | −14.1 |
| Majority | | 5,093 | 2.6 | N/A |
| Turnout | | 199,451 | 37.0 | +1.4 |
| Labour gain from Conservative | | Swing | | |
