= London South West (European Parliament constituency) =

Former European Parliament constituency

- European Parliament constituency
- Boundary within London (1979-1984)
- Member state: United Kingdom
- Created: 1979
- Dissolved: 1999
- MEPs: 1

Prior to its uniform adoption of proportional representation in 1999, the United Kingdom used first-past-the-post for the European elections in England, Scotland and Wales. The European Parliament constituencies used under that system were smaller than the later regional constituencies and only had one Member of the European Parliament each.

The constituency of London South West was one of them.

Boundary within South East England and London (1984-1994)

Boundary within South East England and London (1994-1999)

== Boundaries ==
1979–1984: Battersea North, Battersea South, Kingston upon Thames, Lambeth Central, Putney, Richmond (Surrey), Surbiton, Tooting, Twickenham, Vauxhall.

1984–1994: Battersea, Epsom and Ewell, Kingston upon Thames, Mitcham and Morden, Putney, Surbiton, Tooting, Wimbledon.

1994–1999: Battersea, Kingston upon Thames, Mitcham and Morden, Putney, Streatham, Surbiton, Tooting, Wimbledon.

== Members of the European Parliament ==
Elected	Members	Party
1979	Shelagh Roberts	Conservative
1979 by-election	Shelagh Roberts	Conservative
1984	Shelagh Roberts	Conservative
1989	Anita Pollack	Labour
1994	Anita Pollack	Labour
1999	Constituency abolished: see London	

== Election results ==
European Parliament election, 1979: London South West
Party	Candidate	Votes	%	±%
Conservative	Shelagh Roberts	83,498	52.0	N/A
Labour	A. B. (Tony) Hart	51,742	32.2	N/A
Liberal	B. M. C. Fogarty	21,251	13.2	N/A
Independent	Rev. E. C. Varah	3,613	2.3	N/A
EFP	S. S. Eustace	497	0.3	N/A
Majority		31,756	19.8	N/A
Turnout		160,601	31.4	N/A
Conservative win (new seat)				

Shelagh Roberts was disqualified as she was a member of the Occupational Pensions Board. She resigned from the board and contested the subsequent by-election.

1979 London South West by-election
Party	Candidate	Votes	%	±%
Conservative	Shelagh Roberts	41,096	41.2	▼10.8
Labour	A. B. (Tony) Hart	32,632	32.7	▲0.5
Liberal	Christopher P. Mayhew	23,842	23.9	▲10.7
Anti Common Market and Free Trade Party	W. O. Smedley	1,830	1.9	N/A
Independent Democratic	D. Hussey	305	0.3	N/A
Majority		8,464	8.5	▼11.3
Turnout		99,705	19.4	▼12.0
Conservative hold		Swing	▼5.6	

European Parliament election, 1984: London South West
Party	Candidate	Votes	%	±%
Conservative	Shelagh Roberts	70,490	41.6	▼10.4
Labour	Anita Pollack	63,623	37.6	▲5.3
Liberal	David J. Twigg	32,268	19.0	▲5.8
Ecology	Mrs. S. G. Willington	3,066	1.8	N/A
Majority		6,867	4.1	▼14.7
Turnout		169,447	33.9	▲2.5
Conservative hold		Swing	▼7.9	

European Parliament election, 1989: London South West
Party	Candidate	Votes	%	±%
Labour	Anita Pollack	74,298	38.3	▲0.8
Conservative	Shelagh Roberts	73,780	38.0	▼3.6
Green	Miss Marilyn A. Elson	35,476	18.3	▲16.5
SLD	John C. Field	10,400	5.4	▼13.7
Majority		518	0.3	▼3.8
Turnout		193,954	39.9	▲6.0
Labour gain from Conservative		Swing	▲2.2	

European Parliament election, 1994: London South West
Party	Candidate	Votes	%	±%
Labour	Anita Pollack	81,850	49.7	▲11.4
Conservative	Prof. Philip C. Treleaven	50,875	30.9	▼7.1
Liberal Democrats	Gerry I. Blanchard	18,697	11.4	▲6.0
Green	Tom J. Walsh	5,460	3.3	▼15.0
UKIP	Anthony J. E. Scholefield	4,912	3.0	N/A
Independent	Christopher D. Hopewell	1,840	1.1	N/A
Natural Law	Martin J. H. Simson	625	0.4	N/A
Spirit of Europe	Johan H. Quanjer	377	0.2	N/A
Majority		30,975	18.8	▲18.5
Turnout		164,636	34.4	▼5.9
Labour hold		Swing	▲9.3	
