= Alexander Sherlock =

British politician

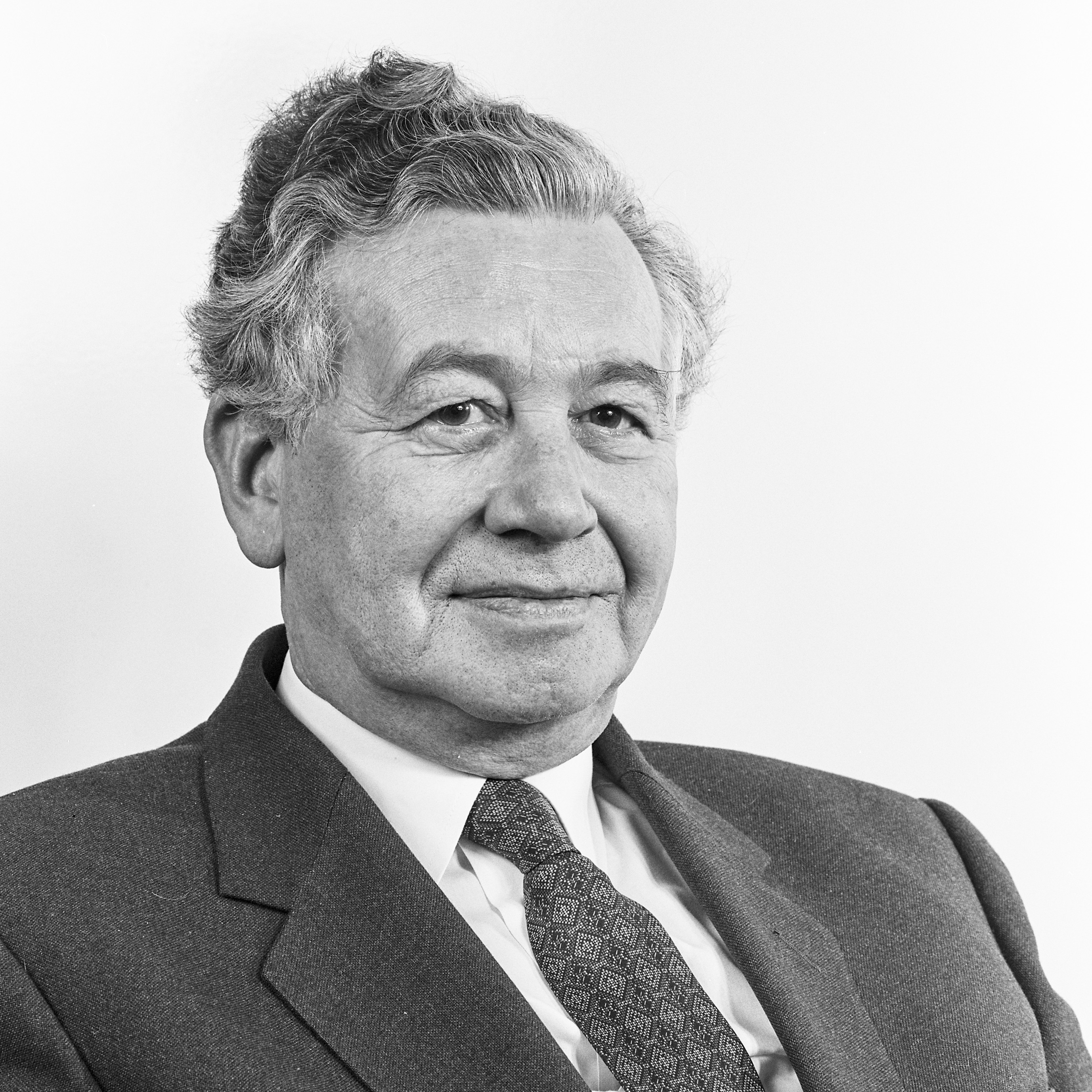
European Parliament portrait

Alexander Sherlock CBE (14 February 1922 – 18 February 1999) was a British Conservative Party politician. He served as a Member of the European Parliament (MEP) for Essex South West from 1979 to 1989.

Originally trained as a medical doctor at the London Hospital, he worked as a GP from 1948 to 1979 in Felixstowe, and was further qualified as an assistant deputy coroner from 1971.

While a general practitioner Alec had to deal with the east coast flood of 1953, which claimed 39 lives, and he was caught in a second blast and suffered severe leg injuries when called to an explosion at Felixstowe gasworks in 1956. He found relaxation in legal studies and was called to the bar in 1961; in 1971 and 1972 he served as assistant deputy coroner for St Pancras. He carried on these activities concurrently with his practice, was county surgeon for the St John Ambulance Brigade, served on urban and county councils, and was active in the rotary club and freemasonry. When he became an MEP as a European Democratic group member he attempted to cure two ills—costly bureaucracy and verbal incontinence, using blunt language that might have caused him trouble if he had been a Westminster MP. He was successful in his official duties as front bench spokesman on the environment and in the committee on the environment, public health, and consumer protection. Whether speaking on budgets, hazardous waste, pollution in general, or the quality of beers and wines, he could be relied on the get quickly to the heart of the matter with technical mastery. In retirement Alec loved to work in his garden. Predeceased by his first wife, Peggy, he leaves his second wife, Eileen; one son and two daughters from his first marriage; eight grandchildren; and one great grandchild.
