= Essex South West (European Parliament constituency) =

Former European Parliament constituency

- European Parliament constituency
- Boundary within the East of England (1979-1984)
- Member state: United Kingdom
- Created: 1979
- Dissolved: 1994
- MEPs: 1

Essex South West was a constituency of the European Parliament located in the United Kingdom, electing one Member of the European Parliament by the first-past-the-post electoral system. Created in 1979 for the first elections to the European Parliament, it was abolished in 1994 and succeeded by the constituencies of Essex West and Hertfordshire East and Essex South.

Boundary within the East of England (1984-1994)

== Boundaries ==
On its creation in 1979, it consisted of the parliamentary constituencies of Basildon, Brentwood and Ongar, Chelmsford, Epping Forest, Harlow and Thurrock.

After the 1984 boundary changes based on the new UK parliamentary constituencies created in 1983, it consisted of Basildon, Billericay, Brentwood and Ongar, Castle Point, Chelmsford, Epping Forest, Harlow and Thurrock.

The constituency was abolished in 1994. Brentwood and Ongar, Chelmsford, Epping Forest and Harlow became part of Essex West and Hertfordshire East. Basildon, Billericay, Castle Point and Thurrock were now part of the new constituency of Essex South.

== MEPs ==
Election	Member	Party
1979	Alexander Sherlock	Conservative
1989	Patricia Rawlings	Conservative
1994	constituency abolished, part of Essex West and Hertfordshire East and Essex South from 1994	

== Election results ==
European Parliament election, 1989: Essex South West
Party	Candidate	Votes	%	±%
Conservative	Patricia Elizabeth Rawlings	77,408	41.1	−4.7
Labour	James W Orpe	68,005	36.1	+0.5
Green	Margaret E Willis	32,242	17.1	New
SLD	Tom P Allen	10,618	5.6	−13.0
Majority		9,403	5.0	−5.2
Turnout		188,273	33.1	+4.8
Conservative hold		Swing	−2.6	

European Parliament election, 1984: Essex South West
Party	Candidate	Votes	%	±%
Conservative	Dr. Alexander Sherlock	72,190	45.8	−8.1
Labour	Conor O'Brien	56,169	35.6	+3.7
Liberal	A F C (Tony) Morris	29,385	18.6	+4.4
Majority		16,021	10.2	−11.8
Turnout		157,744	28.3	−2.2
Conservative hold		Swing	−5.9	

European Parliament election, 1979: Essex South West
Party	Candidate	Votes	%	±%
Conservative	Dr. Alexander Sherlock	78,059	53.9	
Labour	J P Coughlan	46,244	31.9	
Liberal	D M Kitching	20,516	14.2	
Majority		31,815	22.0	
Turnout		144,819	30.5	
Conservative win (new seat)				
