= Anita Pollack =

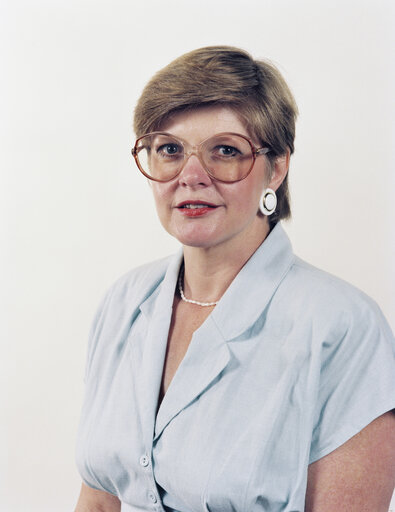
Image of Anita Jean Pollack

Anita J. Pollack (born 3 June 1946) was a Labour MEP for London South West from 1989 to 1999.

Born in Australia, Pollack came to live in London in November 1969 and became a naturalised British citizen in 2005. She was educated at the City of London Polytechnic and the University of London, becoming a book editor and the assistant to an MEP. She became active in the Labour Party, standing unsuccessfully in London South West at the 1984 European Parliament election and in Woking at the 1987 United Kingdom general election, before winning London South West at the 1989 European Parliament election.

As related by John O'Farrell in Things Can Only Get Better, an abuse of search-and-replace at The Guardian resulted in it reporting her victory as that of Anita Turnoutack.

As a British resident and a citizen of a Commonwealth country, she qualified to vote and run for office in the UK (before her naturalisation in 2005). As an Australian citizen she required a visa from France to take up her seat at the European Parliament in Strasbourg. In 1999 she stood on the Labour list in South East England (European Parliament constituency), but was not elected.
