= Angela Billingham, Baroness Billingham =

British politician (born 1939)

The Right Honourable The Baroness Billingham JP
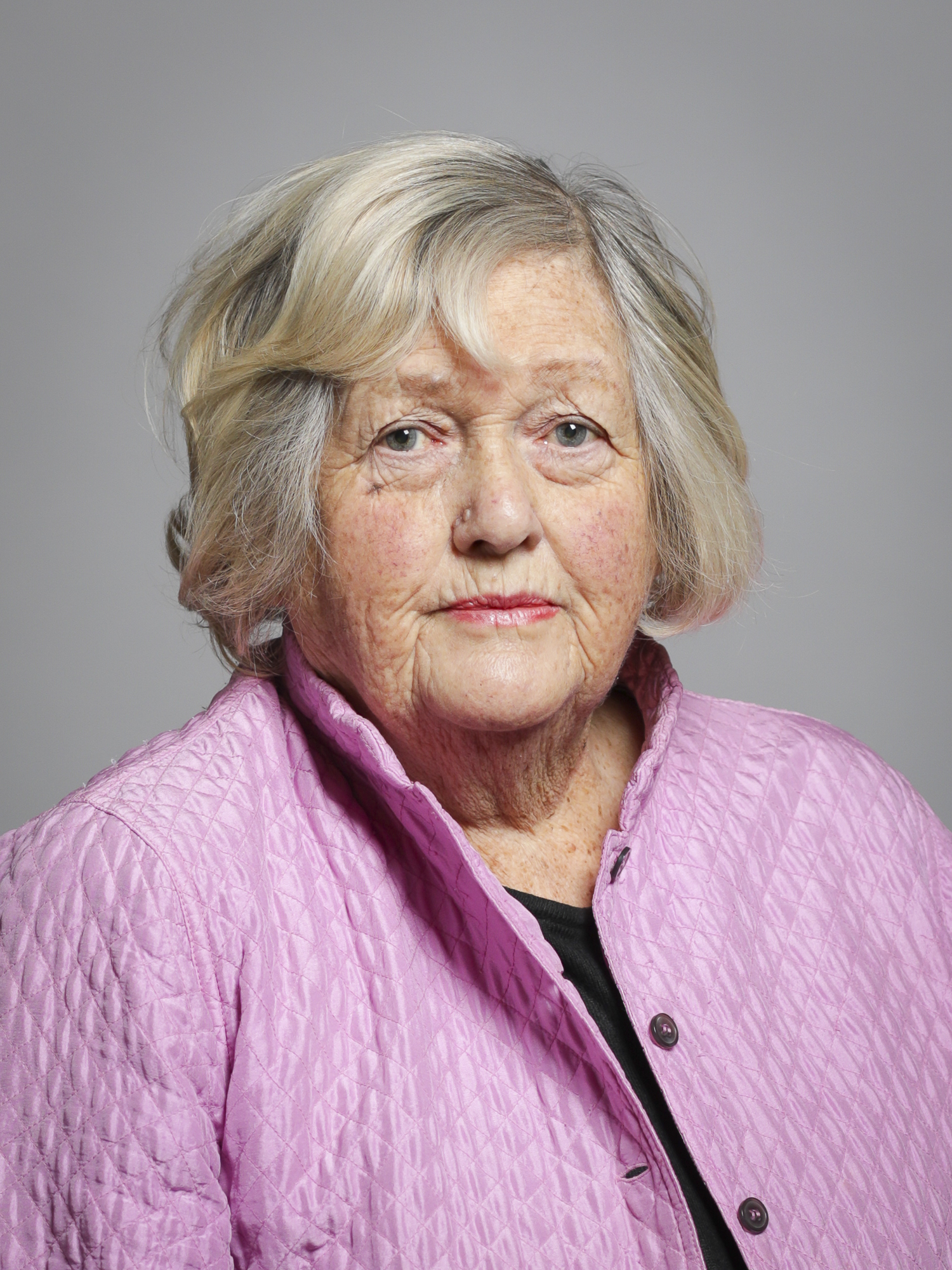
- Official portrait, 2019

Member of the House of Lords
- Lord Temporal
- Life peerage 2 May 2000 – 13 May 2026

Member of the European Parliament for Northamptonshire and Blaby
- In office 9 June 1994 – 10 June 1999
- Preceded by: Constituency established
- Succeeded by: Constituency abolished

Personal details
- Born: Angela Theodora Case; 31 July 1939 (age 87)
- Party: Labour
- Spouse: Peter Billingham
- Children: 2
- Education: Aylesbury Grammar School
- Alma mater: Institute of Education; University of Oxford

Angela Theodora Billingham, Baroness Billingham (née Case; born 31 July 1939), is a British Labour politician who was an MEP for Northamptonshire and Blaby from 1994 to 1999. She was later a member of the House of Lords as a life peer from 2000 to 2026.

== Early life ==
Born Angela Theodora Case in Liverpool, she was educated at Aylesbury Grammar School, the Institute of Education and the Department of Education, University of Oxford. She became a teacher, working in education for thirty-five years until 1995.

== Political career ==
Baroness Billingham was a councillor for many years. From 1970 to 1974, she served on Banbury Borough Council, then from 1974 to 1984 on Cherwell District Council. She was Mayor of Banbury in 1976. She was an Oxfordshire county councillor from 1993 to 1994. She stood for Parliament in 1992 for Banbury, without success.

Billingham was elected to the European Parliament for Northamptonshire and Blaby in 1994. In 1999, she unsuccessfully stood for the European Parliament in the new East Midlands Region. She was made a life peer as Baroness Billingham, of Banbury in the County of Oxfordshire on 2 May 2000 and sat on the Labour benches, until her exclusion from the House on 13 May 2026.

== Interests ==
She has promoted sports for people with disabilities and is a regular on Sky News, for which she previews the following morning's newspapers. Angela also campaigns for reform of the current daylight saving system, arguing that lighter evenings could end the national scourge of childhood obesity by allowing children to do an extra hour of physical activity a day. She also cites economic, environmental and safety concerns as important reasons for reform of the current system. She is also a keen tennis player, and is Chair and Captain of the Commons and Lords Tennis Club, and the Chair of the All-Party Parliamentary Tennis Group.

== Personal life ==
She married Peter Billingham in 1962, and they had two daughters.

== Parliamentary expenses ==
Subsistence allowances are designed to help peers who live in the country to attend late-night votes and debates in Parliament. Billingham, who has a flat in Hampstead and a country house in Suffolk, claimed £26,983 in 2006–07 in overnight allowances, prompting calls for an inquiry.
