= Christine Crawley, Baroness Crawley =

British politician

The Right Honourable The Baroness Crawley FRSA
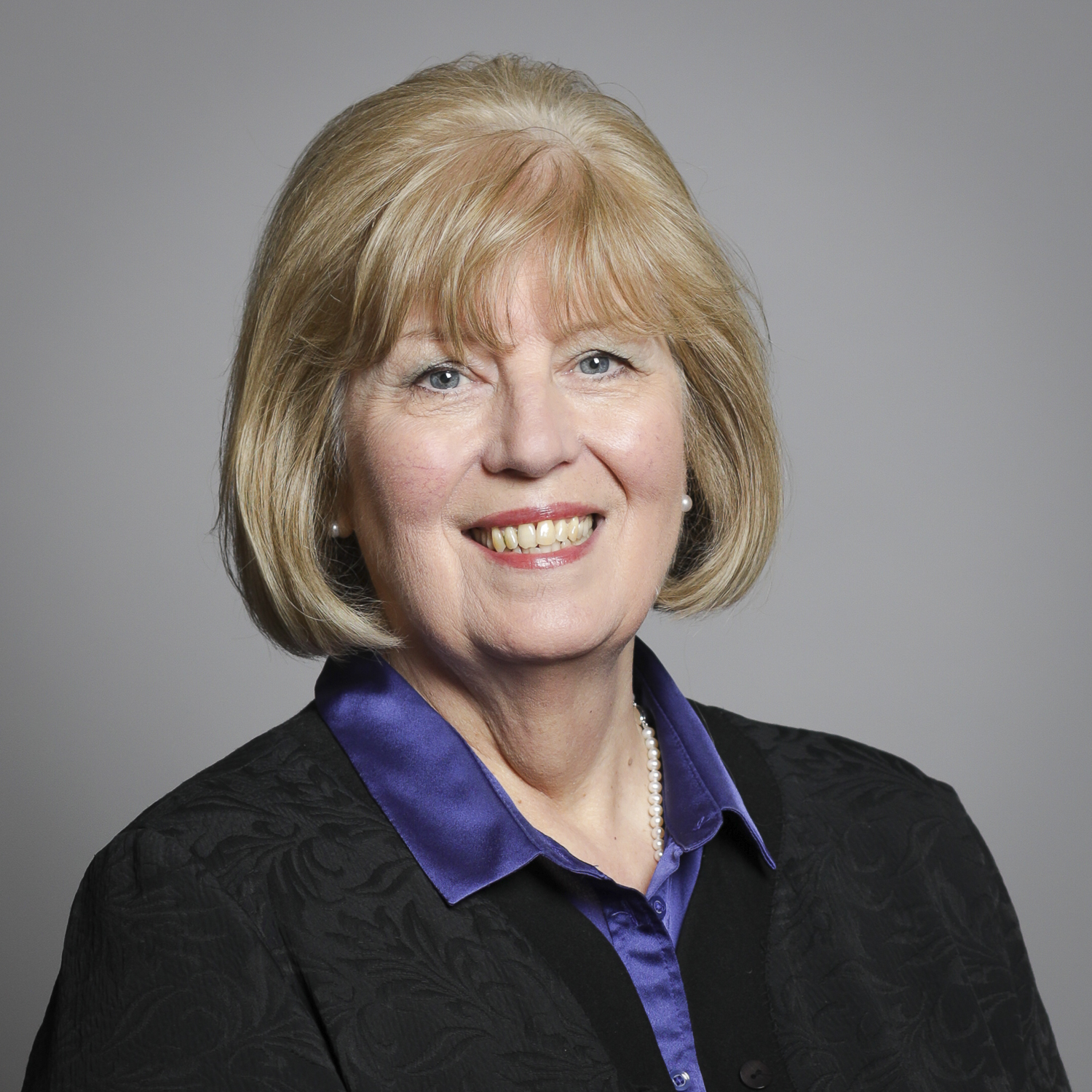

Member of the House of Lords
- Lord Temporal
- Life peerage 24 July 1998

Member of the European Parliament for Birmingham East
- In office 17 June 1984 – 10 June 1999
- Preceded by: Constituency Created
- Succeeded by: Constituency Abolished

Personal details
- Born: 9 January 1950 (age 76) Wicklow, County Wicklow, Republic of Ireland
- Party: Labour
- Education: University of Roehampton, Digby Stuart College
- Occupation: Teacher

Christine Mary Crawley, Baroness Crawley FRSA (born 9 January 1950) is a British politician for the Labour Party.

== Early life ==
Crawley was educated at the Notre Dame High School School in Plymouth before going to Digby Stuart College (University of Roehampton) to train as a teacher.

After graduation she began teaching children aged between 9 and 15, and also ran the local youth theatre.

== Political career ==
Her work to gain funding for the youth theatre brought her into contact with local politicians, and she became involved in politics, joining the Labour Party. Soon after joining the party she became secretary of the local branch, and then Social Secretary for the local Women's Branch. She was elected as a District Councillor for the South Oxfordshire District Council, at a time when the Labour Party was a minority party on the council.

In 1983, she ran for a seat in the House of Commons but was not elected, instead spending a year working on local issues before she was elected as a Member of the European Parliament (MEP) for the Birmingham East constituency). As an MEP Crawley was active on the Committee on Women's Rights and Gender Equality and helped push their Maternity Leave Directive through, becoming chair of that committee in 1989. She stepped down as an MEP in 1999, and is now a member of the West Midlands Regional Assembly and a sponsor of the National Women's Network.

She was Chair of the Women's National Commission between 1999 and 2001, and in 1998 was created Baroness Crawley, of Edgbaston in the County of West Midlands. Between 2002 and 2008 she served as a Party Whip in the House of Lords. She is a member of Labour Friends of Israel.

== Honours ==
In 2013, Baroness Crawley was awarded an Honorary Doctorate of Health from Plymouth University

== Personal life ==
The ancient historian Josephine Crawley Quinn is her daughter.
