= Christine Oddy =

English politician

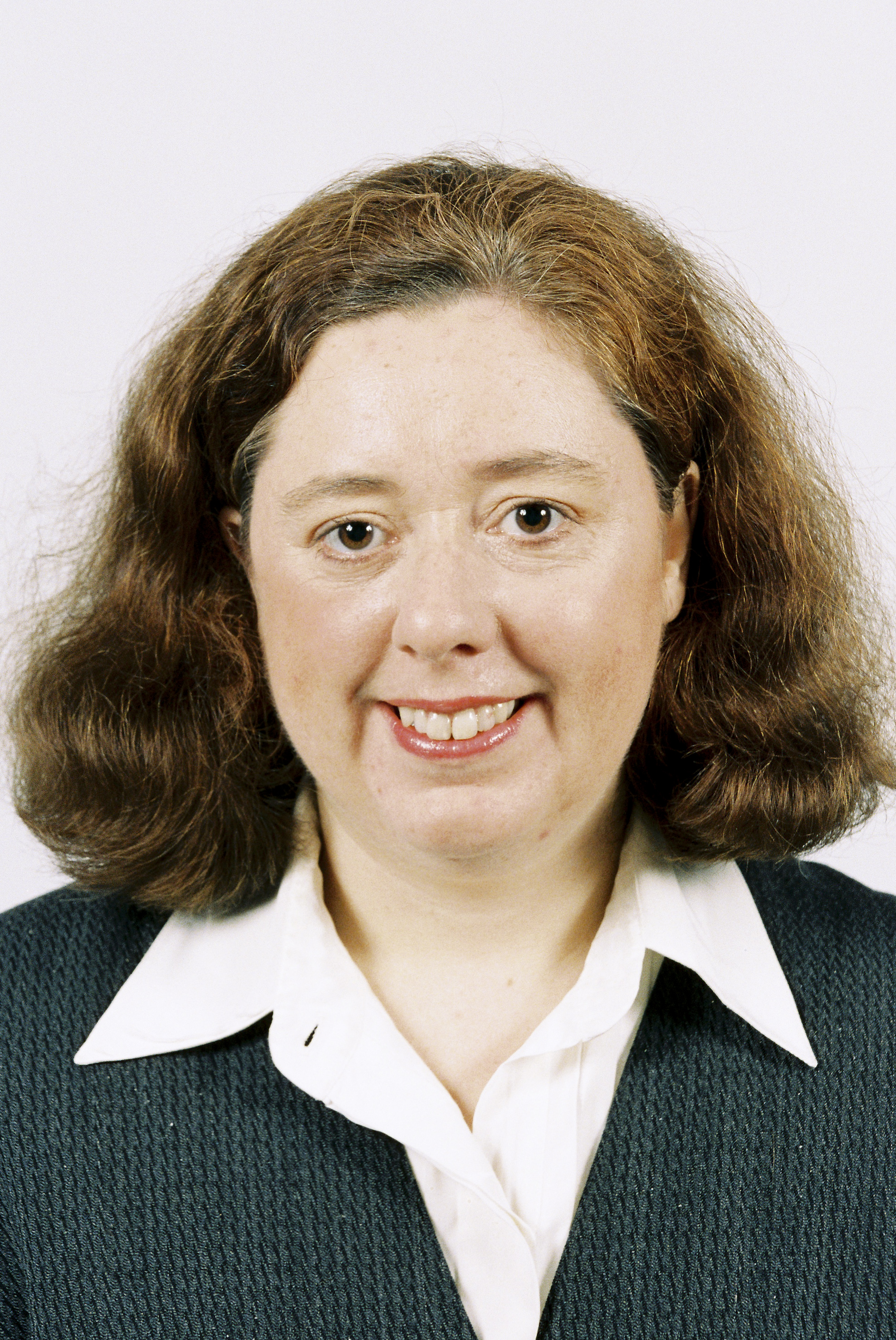
European Parliament portrait

Christine Margaret Oddy (20 September 1955 – 27 July 2014) was an English politician who was the Labour Member of the European Parliament for the Midlands Central constituency from 1989 to 1999.

== Biography ==
Born and brought up in Coventry, Oddy was educated at Stoke Park School, University College London, the Institute of European Studies, and Birkbeck College. She worked as a solicitor, and later as a lecturer, also serving as an officer for NATFHE.

Oddy was the Labour Member of the European Parliament for the Midlands Central constituency from 1989 to 1999. She won the seat from the Conservatives in 1989 and retained it in 1994. She served on several committees including Committee on Women's Rights, and also spent time as the treasurer of the European Parliamentary Labour Party. However, she only obtained seventh place out of eight on the proposed Labour Party candidate list for the West Midlands constituency for the 1999 European Parliament elections. She described her low ranking as an insult to her constituents.

Oddy then took the Labour Party to an industrial tribunal about the selection procedures for the list, and was removed altogether from the Labour Party list about a month before the election. She resigned from the Labour Party, and contested, as an independent, the 1999 European election in the West Midlands constituency (gaining 36,000 votes) and the 2001 UK general election in Coventry North West.

== Cancer and death ==
Oddy later won damages from University Hospital Coventry in relation to alleged shortcomings with her care and treatment for cervical cancer, The cancer metastasized and she died on 27 July 2014, aged 58.
