= 1999 European Parliament election in the United Kingdom =

- 10 June 1999

All 87 seats of the United Kingdom's seats in the European Parliament
- Turnout: 24.0% (▼12.4%)
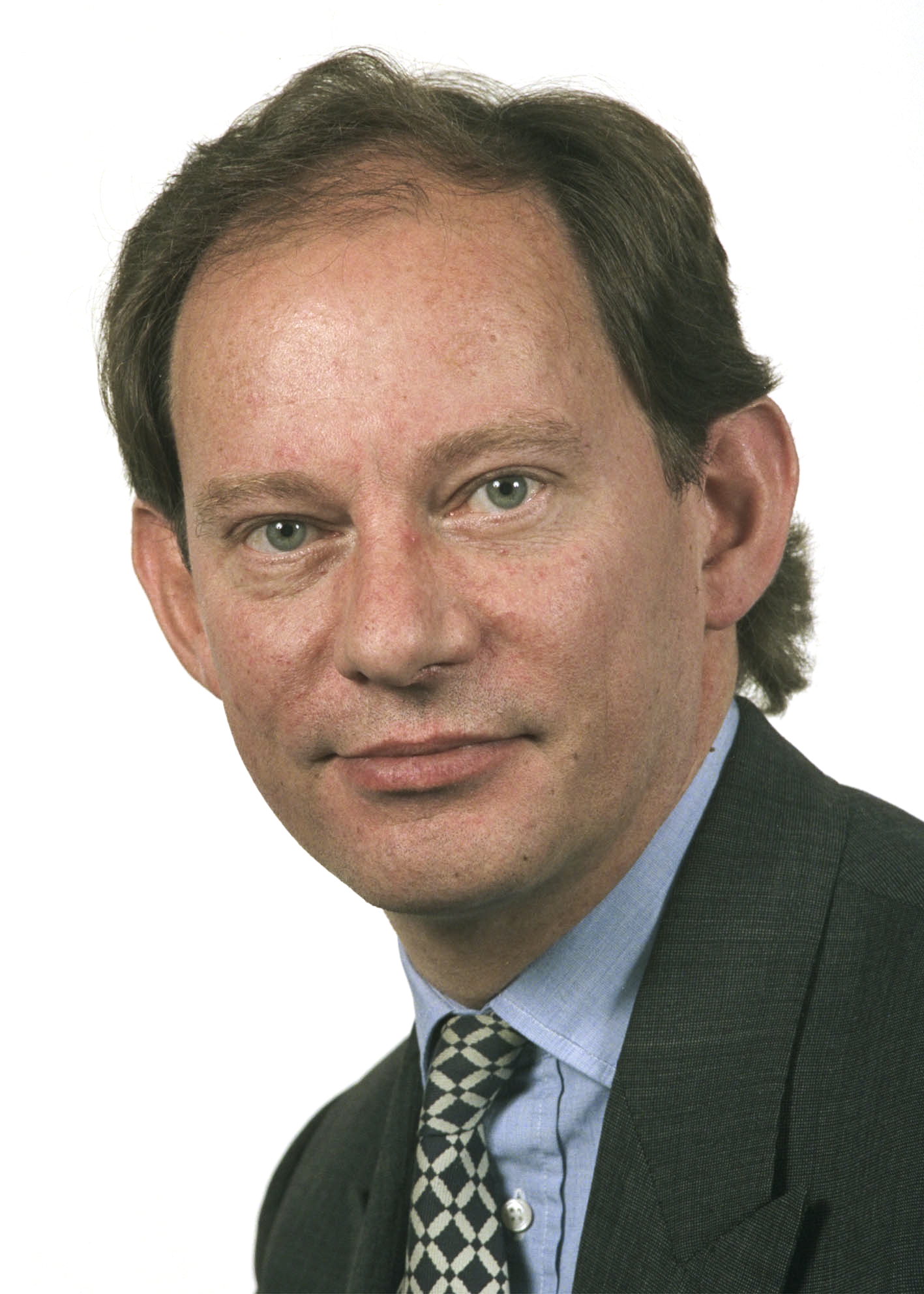

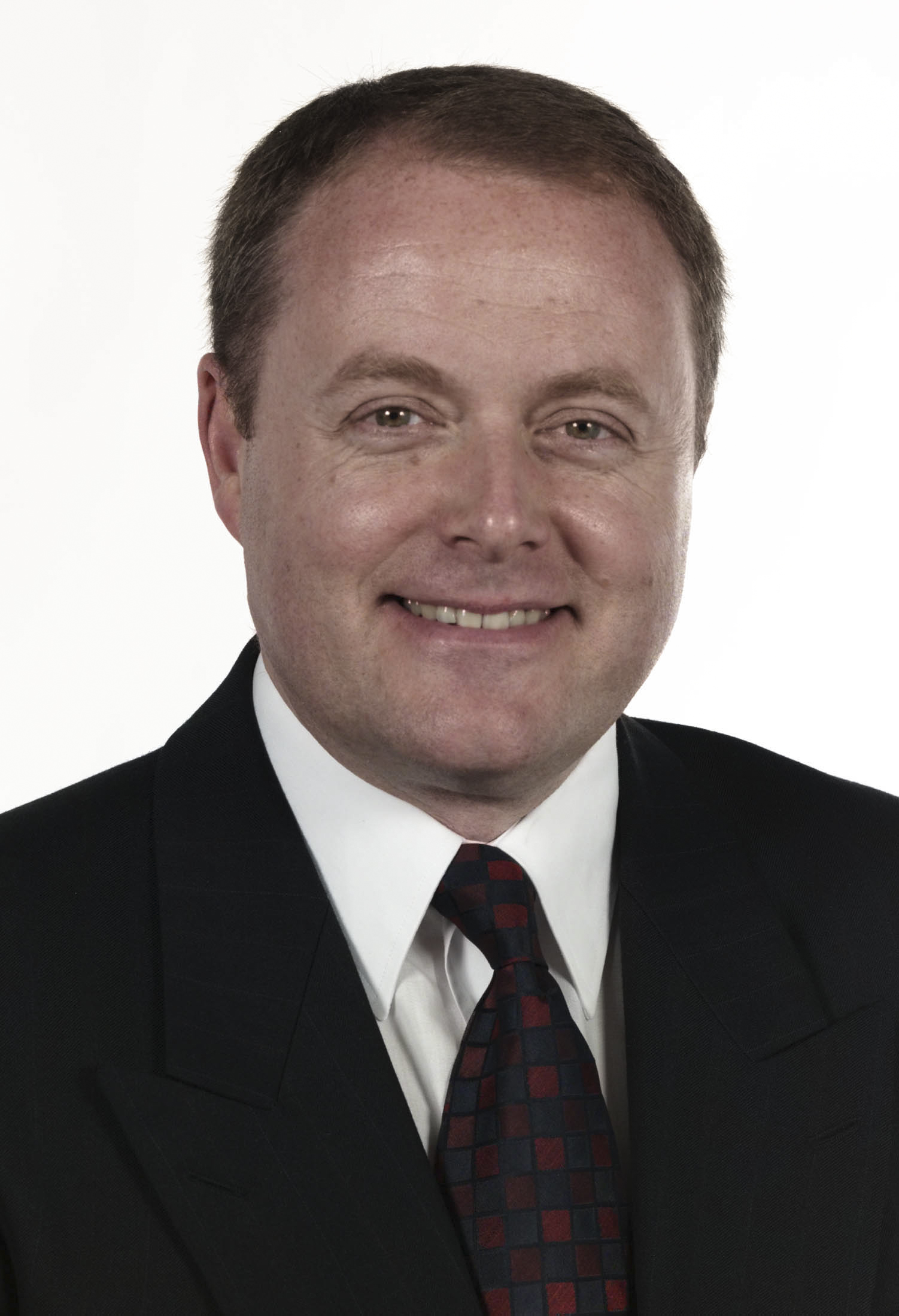

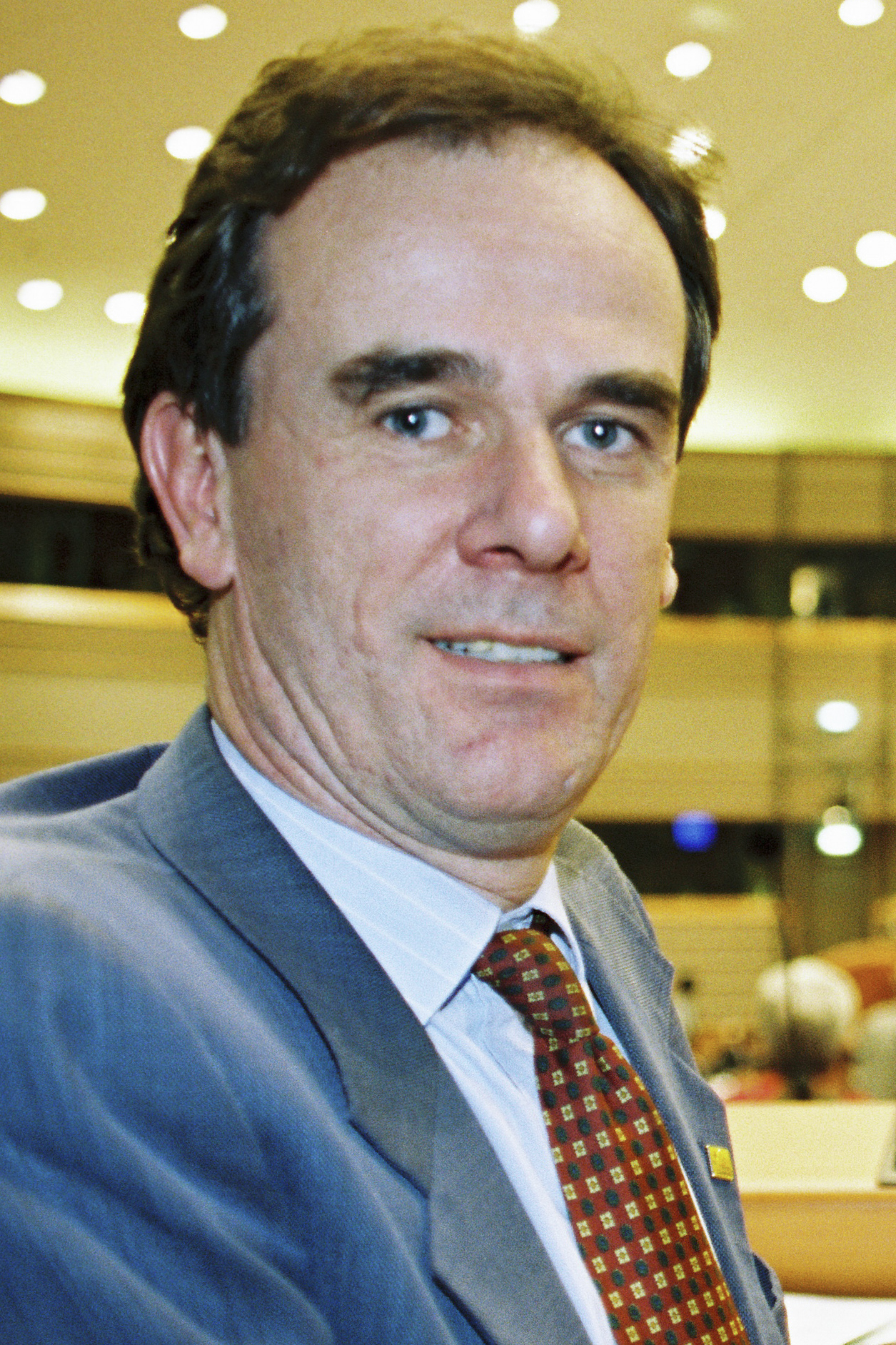

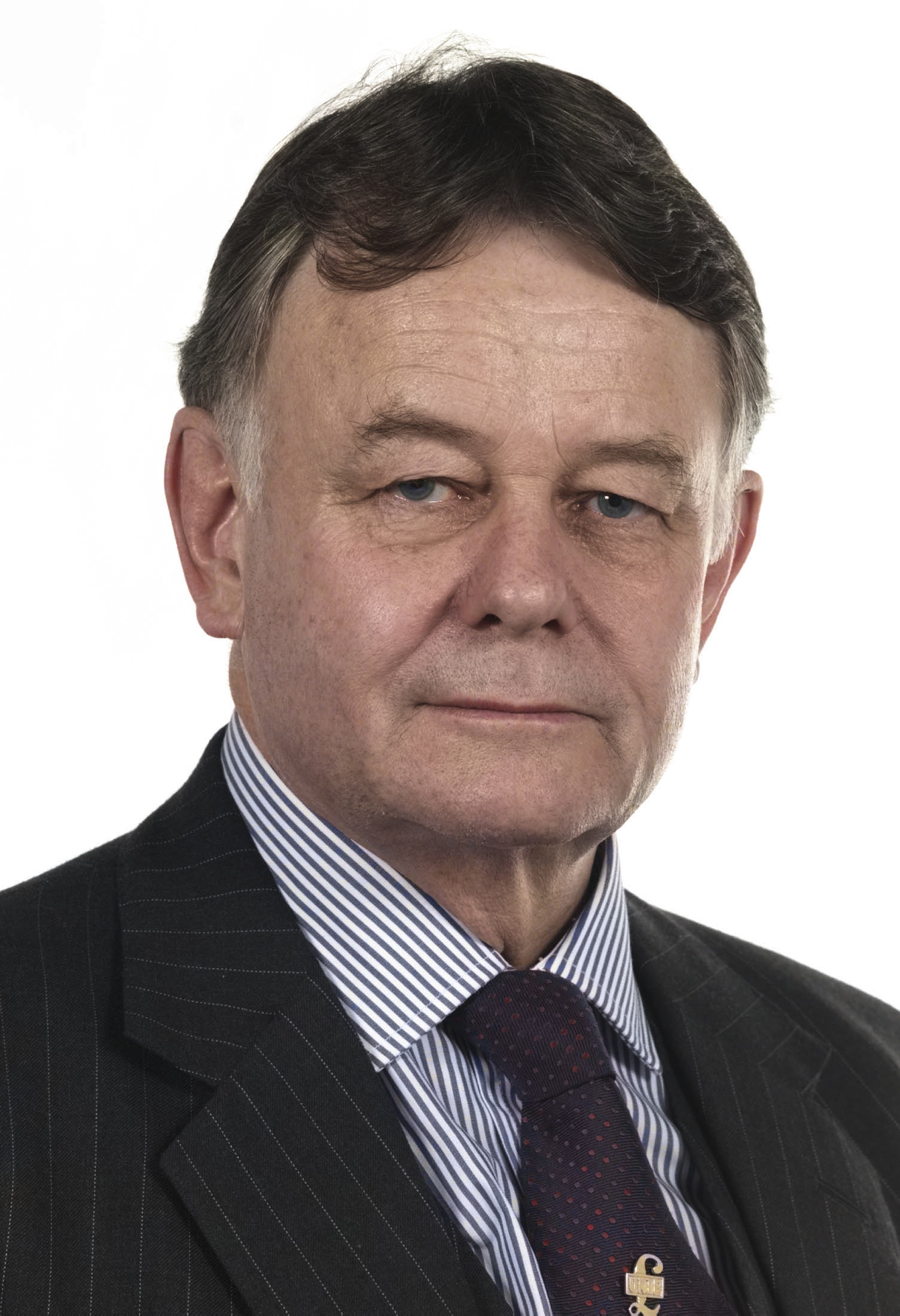

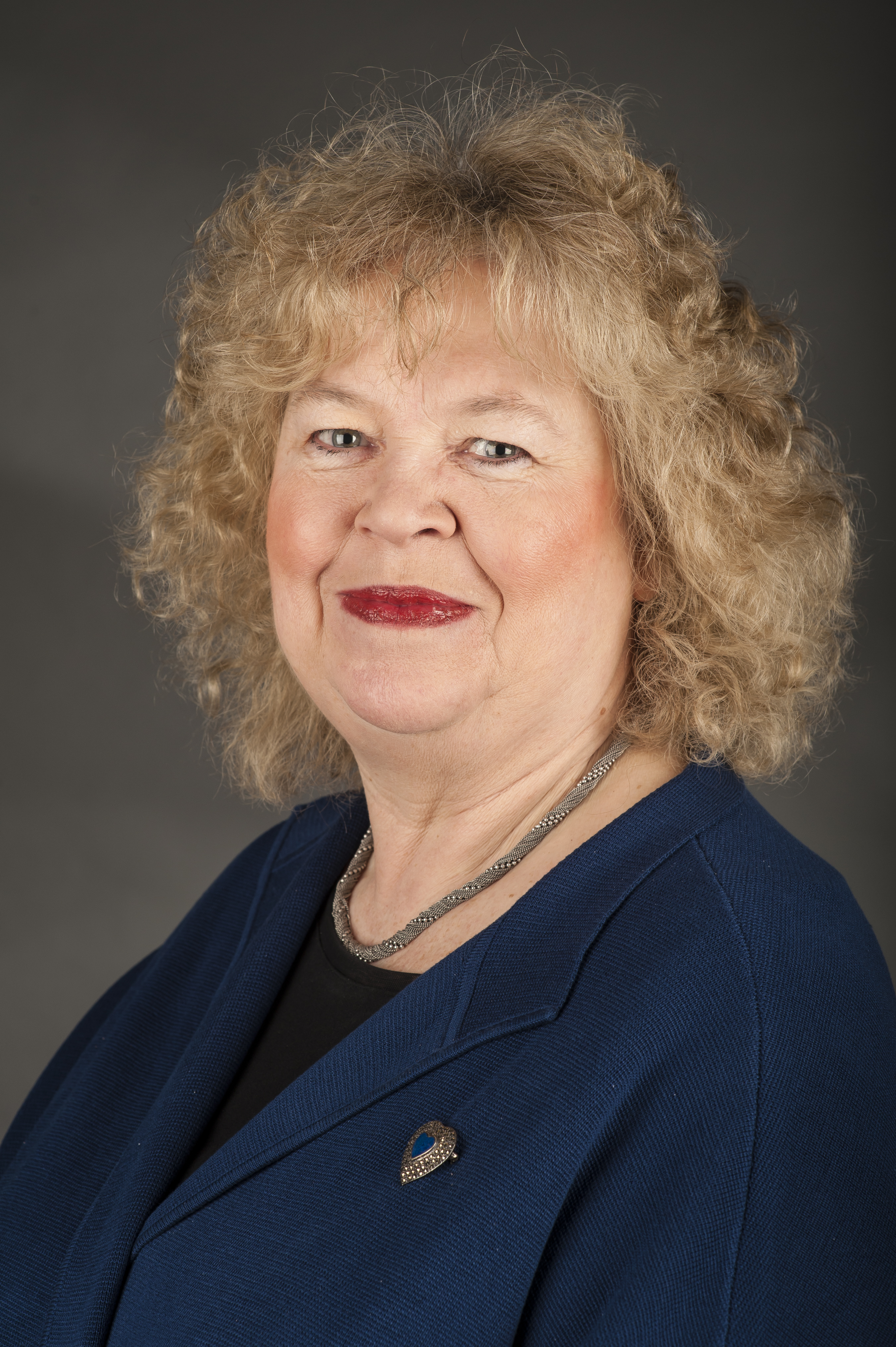

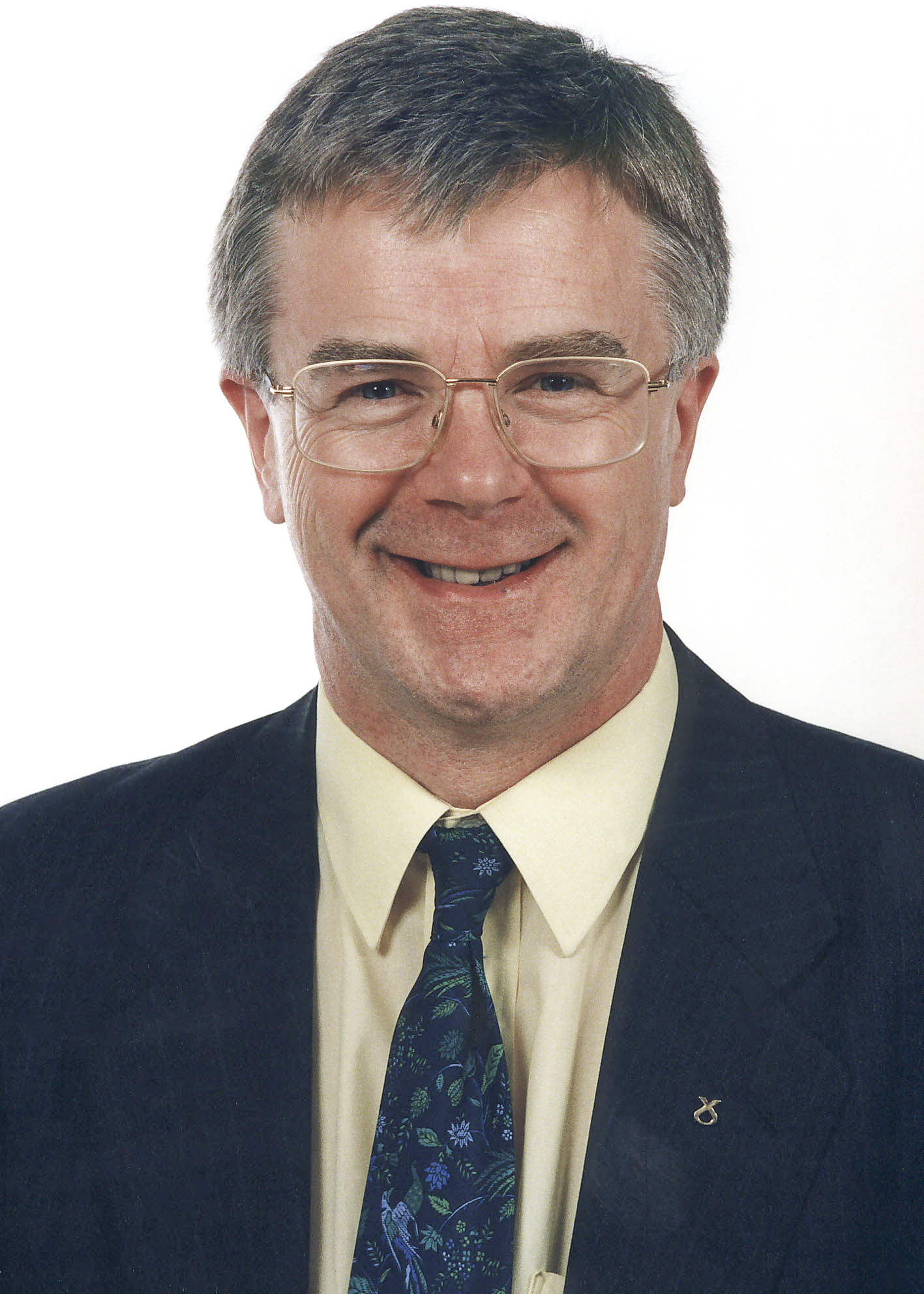
	First party	Second party	Third party
Leader	Edward McMillan-Scott	Alan Donnelly	Robin Teverson
Party	Conservative	Labour	Liberal Democrats
Alliance	EPP	PES	ALDE
Leader since	16 September 1997	1997	1994
Leader's seat	Yorkshire and the Humber (Note: Previously MEP for North Yorkshire before being elected to Yorkshire and the Humber at this election.)	North East England (Note: Previously MEP for Tyne and Wear before being elected to North East England at this election.)	South West England (defeated)
Last election	18 seats, 26.8%	62 seats, 42.6%	2 seats, 17%
Seats won	36	29	10
Seat change	▲18	▼33	▲8
Popular vote	3,578,218	2,803,821	1,266,549
Percentage	33.5%	26.3%	11.9%
Swing	▲6.5%	▼16.4%	▼4.3%
	Fourth party	Fifth party	Sixth party
Leader	Michael Holmes	Jean Lambert (Note: Lambert was one of the party's Principal Speakers.)	Ian Hudghton (Note: Hudghton was the SNP's lead candidate.)
Party	UKIP	Green	SNP
Alliance	EDD	Green	EFA
Leader since	September 1997	1998	1999
Leader's seat	Ran in South West England (won)	Ran in London (won)	Scotland
Last election	0 seats, 1.0%	0 seats, 3.0%	2 seats, 3.1%
Seats won	3	2	2
Seat change	▲3	▲2	Steady
Popular vote	696,057	568,236	268,528
Percentage	6.5%	5.3%	2.5%
Swing	▲5.5%	▲2.3%	▼0.6%
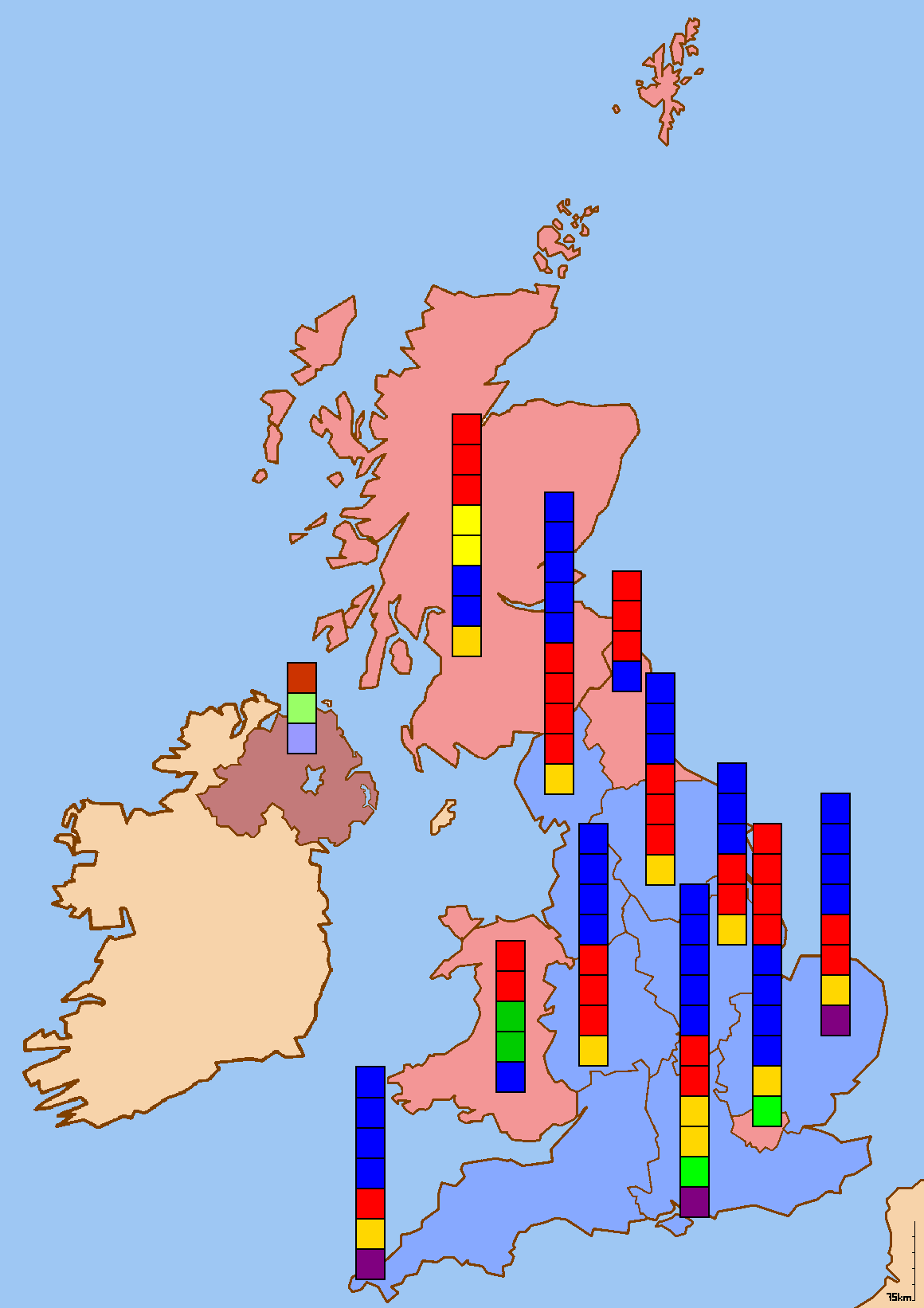
- Colours denote the winning party, as shown in the main table of results

Leader of Largest Party before election
Tony Blair
Labour
Subsequent Leader of Largest Party
William Hague
Conservative

The 1999 European Parliament election was the United Kingdom's part of the European Parliament election 1999. It was held on 10 June 1999. Following the European Parliamentary Elections Act 1999, it was the first European election to be held in the United Kingdom where the whole country used a system of proportional representation. In total, 87 Members of the European Parliament were elected from the United Kingdom across twelve new regional constituencies.

The change in voting system resulted in significant changes in seats. The Conservatives won double the number of seats they had won in the previous European election, in 1994, while the Labour Party saw its seats reduced from 62 to 29. The Liberal Democrats saw their number of seats increase to 10 from just 2 in the previous election. The UK Independence Party (UKIP), Green Party and Plaid Cymru gained their first seats in the European Parliament.

A by-election to the British Parliament also took place on the same day in the Leeds Central constituency - Labour held the seat but with significantly reduced turnout.

The House of Commons Library calculated notional seat changes based on what the result would have been if the 1994 European elections had been held under proportional representation. The notional results and seat changes are shown in the results box for this article.

It was the first European Parliament election to be held since the 1997 general election which resulted in a change of government from Conservative to Labour.

Turnout was 24%, the lowest of any member state in the 1999 election where the EU average was 49.51%. It was also the lowest of any European election in the United Kingdom, and the lowest of any member state until the 2009 election and to date is the lowest turnout for any national election in the history of the United Kingdom.

== Background ==
=== Electoral system ===
The European Parliamentary Elections Act 1999 introduced a closed-list party list system method of proportional representation, calculated using the D'Hondt method into Great Britain. In Northern Ireland, the Single Transferable Vote, which is also a form of proportional representation, which had been used since the first European election in 1979 was retained. The Act also created twelve new electoral regions, which were based on the British government's nine administrative Regions of England, Northern Ireland, Scotland and Wales. The effect of the introduction of proportional representation was that many small parties won seats to the European Parliament for the first time.

== Results ==
=== United Kingdom ===
Map showing most popular party by counting area.

The Conservatives doubled the number of seats from the last European election. Labour saw their 62 seats reduced to just 29. It was the first European Parliament election to be held since the change of United Kingdom government from Conservative to Labour two years earlier. The Liberal Democrats saw their number of seats increase to 10 from just 2 in the previous election. The UK Independence Party, Green Party and Plaid Cymru won their first seats in the European Parliament.

These changes were largely due to the move to proportional representation from first-past-the-post. The House of Commons Library calculated that if the 1994 European elections had been held under proportional representation, Labour would have won 43 MEPs, the Conservatives 26, the Lib Dems 11, the SNP 3 and Plaid Cymru 1.

Party	Votes won	% of vote	Change	Seats	% of seats	Loss/Gain vs actual '94 result	Loss/Gain vs notional '94 result
Conservative	3,578,218	33.5	▲6.5	36	41.4	▲18	▲10
Labour	2,803,821	26.3	▼16.4	29	33.3	▼33	▼14
Liberal Democrats	1,266,549	11.9	▼4.3	10	11.9	▲8	▼1
UKIP	696,057	6.5	▲5.6	3	3.4	▲3	▲3
Green	568,236	5.3	▲2.3	2	2.4	▲2	▲2
SNP	268,528	2.5	▼0.6	2	2.3	Steady	▼1
DUP	192,762	1.8	▲0.8	1	1.1	Steady	Steady
SDLP	190,731	1.8	▲0.8	1	1.1	Steady	Steady
Plaid Cymru	185,235	1.7	▲0.7	2	2.3	▲2	▲1
Pro-Euro Conservative	138,097	1.3	New	0	Steady	Steady	Steady
UUP	119,507	1.1	▲0.3	1	1.1	Steady	Steady
Sinn Féin	117,643	1.1	▲0.8	0	Steady	Steady	Steady
BNP	102,647	1.0	New	0	Steady	Steady	Steady
Liberal	93,051	0.9	▲0.3	0	Steady	Steady	Steady
Socialist Labour	86,749	0.8	New	0	Steady	Steady	Steady
Green	57,142	0.5	▲0.4	0	Steady	Steady	Steady
Scottish Socialist	39,720	0.4	New	0	Steady	Steady	Steady
PUP	22,494	0.2	New	0	Steady	Steady	Steady
Natural Law	21,327	0.2	▼0.4	0	Steady	Steady	Steady
UK Unionist	20,283	0.2	New	0	Steady	Steady	Steady
Alliance	14,391	0.1	Steady	0	Steady	Steady	Steady
Socialist Alliance	7,203	0.1	New	0	Steady	Steady	Steady
Humanist	2,586	0.0	New	0	Steady	Steady	Steady
Weekly Worker	1,724	0.0	New	0	Steady	Steady	Steady
Socialist (GB)	1,510	0.0	New	0	Steady	Steady	Steady
Others	84,872	0.8		0	Steady	Steady	Steady
Total	10,681,083			87	100		
Source: BBC News, UK Parliament Briefing

=== Great Britain ===
Summary of the election results for Great Britain

Party	Votes won	% of vote	Loss/Gain	Seats	% of seats	Loss/Gain vs actual '94 result	Loss/Gain vs notional '94 result
Conservative	3,578,218	35.8	▲7.9	36	42.9	▲18	
Labour	2,803,821	28.0	▼16.1	29	34.5	▼33	
Liberal Democrats	1,266,549	12.7	▼4.1	10	11.9	▲8	
UKIP	696,057	7.0	▲6.0	3	3.6	▲3	▲3
Green	568,236	6.3	▲2.6	2	2.4	▲2	▲2
SNP	268,528	2.7	▼0.5	2	2.4	Steady	▼1
Plaid Cymru	185,235	1.9	▲0.8	2	2.4	▲2	▲1
Pro-Euro Conservative	138,097	1.4	New	0	Steady	Steady	Steady
BNP	102,647	1.0	New	0	Steady	Steady	Steady
Liberal	93,051	0.9	▲0.3	0	Steady	Steady	Steady
Socialist Labour	86,749	0.9	New	0	Steady	Steady	Steady
Green	57,142	0.6	▲0.4	0	Steady	Steady	Steady
Scottish Socialist	39,720	0.4	New	0	Steady	Steady	Steady
Natural Law	20,329	0.4	▼0.2	0	Steady	Steady	Steady
Socialist Alliance	7,203	0.1	New	0	Steady	Steady	Steady
Humanist	2,586	0.0	New	0	Steady	Steady	Steady
Weekly Worker	1,724	0.0	New	0	Steady	Steady	Steady
Socialist (GB)	1,510	0.1	New	0	Steady	Steady	Steady
Others	84,872	0.8		0	Steady	Steady	Steady
Total	10,002,273			84	100		
Source: BBC News, UK Parliament Briefing

=== Northern Ireland ===
Summary of the election results for Northern Ireland

European Parliament election 1999: Northern Ireland
Party	Candidate(s)	Seats	Loss/Gain	First Preference Votes	
Party	Candidate(s)	Seats	Loss/Gain	Number	% of vote
DUP	Ian Paisley	1	0	192,762	28.4
SDLP	John Hume	1	0	190,731	28.1
UUP	Jim Nicholson	1	0	119,507	17.6
Sinn Féin	Mitchel McLaughlin	0	0	117,643	17.3
PUP	David Ervine	0	0	22,494	3.3
UK Unionist	Robert McCartney	0	0	20,283	3.0
Alliance	Seán Neeson	0	0	14,391	2.1
Natural Law	James Anderson	0	0	998	0.2
Turnout				678,809	

=== MEPs defeated ===
Labour

- Angela Billingham (East Midlands)
- Sue Waddington (East Midlands)
- Veronica Hardstaff (East Midlands)
- Clive Needle (East of England)
- Peter Truscott (East of England)
- David Thomas (East of England)
- Carole Tongue (London)
- Shaun Spiers (London)
- Mary Honeyball (London)
- Michael Elliot (London)
- Dr Gordon Adam (North East)
- Tony Cunningham (North West)
- Mark Hendrick (North West)
- Hugh McMahon (Scotland)
- Anita Pollack (South East England)
- Ian White (South West England)
- Joe Wilson (Wales)
- David Morris (Wales)
- Michael Tappin (West Midlands)
- David Hallam (West Midlands)
- Roger Barton (Yorkshire and the Humber)
- Barry Seal (Yorkshire and the Humber)

Liberal Democrat

- Robin Teverson (South West England)

Conservative

- Edward Kellett-Bowman (South East England)
- Bryan Cassidy (South West England)

Pro-Euro Conservative Party

- John Stevens, former Conservative MEP (South East England)
- Brendan Donnelly, former Conservative MEP (West Midlands)

Independent Labour

- Christine Oddy, former Labour MEP (West Midlands)

Scottish Socialist Party

- Hugh Kerr, former Labour MEP (Essex West and Hertfordshire East)

Leeds Left Alliance

- Ken Coates, former Labour MEP (East Midlands)

== Aftermath ==
Labour's results brought about a debate within the party about the introduction of proportional representation. In September 1998, a poll of 150 MPs had found that 58% backed the introduction of proportional representation. A follow-up poll ran on the Sunday after the election found that this had decreased to 43%, with the majority wanting a return to the first-past-the-post system. It has also been argued, however, that the introduction of proportional representation actually reduced Labour's losses, as first-past-the-post is more sensitive to swings in public opinion.

== See also ==
- Elections in the United Kingdom: European elections
- List of members of the European Parliament for the United Kingdom (1999–2004)
- Members of the European Parliament for the United Kingdom 1999–2004 by region
