= List of members of the European Parliament for the United Kingdom (2014–2019) =

The 8th European Parliament was elected across the European Union in the late days of May 2014 for the 2014–2019 session. The United Kingdom was apportioned to send 73 out of the 751 Member of the European Parliament (MEPs) that are listed below.

== Contribution of UK political parties within European Parliament political groups ==
The UK had representation with 73 of the 751 seats of the European Parliament with party contributions within political groups as follows at time of dissolution:

National party	MEPs	Political group	Governance
Labour Party	19 / 185	S&D	Commission majority
Conservative Party	18 / 77	ECR	Opposition and non-aligned
UKIP	2 / 36	ENF	Opposition and non-aligned
UKIP	1 / 20	NI	Opposition and non-aligned
Green Party	3 / 52	Greens/EFA	Opposition and non-aligned
Scottish National Party	2 / 52	Greens/EFA	Opposition and non-aligned
Ulster Unionist Party	1 / 77	ECR	Opposition and non-aligned
Liberal Democrats	1 / 69	ALDE	Commission majority
Sinn Féin	1 / 52	GUE/NGL	Opposition and non-aligned
Plaid Cymru	1 / 52	Greens/EFA	Opposition and non-aligned
Democratic Unionist Party	1 / 20	Non-Inscrits	Opposition and non-aligned
Independent	2 / 216	EPP	Commission majority
SDP	1 / 42	EFDD	Opposition and non-aligned
Brexit Party	14 / 42	EFDD	Opposition and non-aligned
Independent	1 / 36	ENF	Opposition and non-aligned
Independent	3 / 42	EFDD	Opposition and non-aligned
Independent politician	1 / 20	Non-Inscrits	Opposition and non-aligned
vacant	2 / 21	n/a	n/a

== Members at dissolution ==
This table can be sorted by constituency, party or party group: click the symbol at the top of the appropriate column.

Name	Constituency	National Party	EP Group
Stuart Agnew	East of England	UKIP	EFDD (until 15 October 2014) NI (until 19 October 2014) EFDD (until 15 January 2019) ENF
Tim Aker	East of England	UKIP (until 5 December 2018) Thurrock Independents (until 11 February 2019) Brexit Party (Note: Aker was originally elected for UKIP but joined the Thurrock Independents by 9 December 2018 and then the Brexit Party in February 2019)	EFDD (until 15 October 2014) NI (until 19 October 2014) EFDD
Lucy Anderson	London	Labour Party	S&D
Martina Anderson	Northern Ireland	Sinn Féin	EUL-NGL
Jonathan Arnott	North East England	UKIP (until 18 January 2018) Independent (until 16 April 2019) Brexit Party (Note: Arnott was originally elected for UKIP but left the party in January 2018, and joined The Brexit Party in April 2019)	EFDD (until 15 October 2014) NI (until 19 October 2014) EFDD
Richard Ashworth	South East England	Conservative Party (until 31 March 2019) Change UK – The Independent Group (Note: Ashworth was originally elected for the Conservative Party but was expelled from the party in September 2018. He sat (with fellow Conservatives) in the ECR group until February 2018 when he joined the EPP group)	ECR (until 27 February 2018) EPP
Janice Atkinson	South East England	UKIP (until 1 October 2015) Independent (Note: Atkinson was elected for UKIP but was expelled from the party in 2015. She joined ENF in June 2015)	EFDD (until 15 October 2014) NI (until 19 October 2014) EFDD (until 15 June 2019) ENF
Amjad Bashir	Yorkshire and the Humber	UKIP (until 28 January 2015) Conservative Party (Note: Bashir was originally elected for UKIP but joined the Conservative Party in January 2015)	EFDD (until 15 October 2014) NI (until 19 October 2014) EFDD (until 22 January 2015) ECR
Gerard Batten	London	UKIP	EFDD (until 15 October 2014) NI (until 19 October 2014) EFDD (until 7 December 2018) NI (until 15 January 2019) ENF
Catherine Bearder	South East England	Liberal Democrats	ALDE
Louise Bours	North West England	UKIP (until 22 November 2018) Independent (Note: Bours was originally elected for UKIP but left the party in November 2018)	EFDD (until 15 October 2014) NI (until 19 October 2014) EFDD
Paul Brannen	North East England	Labour Party	S&D
Jonathan Bullock	East Midlands	UKIP (until 9 December 2018) Independent (until 12 February 2019) Brexit Party (Note: Bullock was originally elected for UKIP but left the party in December 2018. In February 2019, he joined the Brexit Party.)	EFDD
David Campbell Bannerman	East of England	Conservative Party	ECR
James Carver	West Midlands	UKIP (until 27 May 2018) Independent (Note: Carver was elected for UKIP but left the party in May 2018)	EFDD (until 15 October 2014) NI (until 19 October 2014) EFDD (until 27 May 2018) NI (until 9 January 2019) ENF
David Coburn	Scotland	UKIP (until 8 January 2019) Independent (until 11 February 2019) Brexit Party (Note: Coburn was originally elected for UKIP but left the party in December 2018)	EFDD (until 15 October 2014) NI (until 19 October 2014) EFDD
Jane Collins	Yorkshire and the Humber	UKIP (until 15 April 2019) Brexit Party (Note: Collins was originally elected for UKIP but left the party in April 2019)	EFDD (until 15 October 2014) NI (until 19 October 2014) EFDD (until 15 January 2019) ENF (until 16 April 2019) EFDD (Note: Collins left EFDD to join ENF in January 2019, but rejoined EFDD in April 2019)
Richard Corbett	Yorkshire and the Humber	Labour Party	S&D
Seb Dance	London	Labour Party	S&D
Daniel Dalton	West Midlands	Conservative Party	ECR
The Earl of Dartmouth	South West England	UKIP (until 27 November 2018) Independent (Note: The Earl of Dartmouth was originally elected for UKIP but resigned from the party in September 2018)	EFDD (until 15 October 2014) NI (until 19 October 2014) EFDD
Nirj Deva	South East England	Conservative Party	ECR
Diane Dodds	Northern Ireland	Democratic Unionist Party	NI
Bill Etheridge	West Midlands	UKIP (until 1 October 2018) Thurrock Independents (until 7 October 2018) Libertarian Party (until 12 February 2019) Brexit Party (Note: Etheridge was originally elected for UKIP but resigned from the party in October 2018, before joining the Libertarian Party and stating he would continue to be a member of EFDD)	EFDD (until 15 October 2014) NI (until 19 October 2014) EFDD
Jill Evans	Wales	Plaid Cymru	Greens–EFA
Nigel Farage	South East England	UKIP (until 4 December 2018) Independent (until 11 February 2019) Brexit Party (Note: Farage was originally elected for UKIP but resigned from the party in December 2018)	EFDD (until 15 October 2014) NI (until 19 October 2014) EFDD
John Flack	East of England	Conservative Party	ECR
Ray Finch	South East England	UKIP (until 16 April 2019) Brexit Party (Note: Finch was originally elected for UKIP but joined The Brexit Party in April 2019)	EFDD (until 15 October 2014) NI (until 19 October 2014) EFDD
Jacqueline Foster	North West England	Conservative Party	ECR
Ashley Fox	South West England	Conservative Party	ECR
Nathan Gill	Wales	UKIP (until 6 December 2018) Independent (until 11 February 2019) Brexit Party (Note: Gill was originally elected for UKIP but resigned from the party in December 2018)	EFDD (until 15 October 2014) NI (until 19 October 2014) EFDD
Neena Gill	West Midlands	Labour Party	S&D
Julie Girling	South West England	Conservative Party Independent (Note: Girling was originally elected for the Conservative Party but was expelled from the party in September 2018. She sat in the ECR group until February 2018 when she joined the EPP group.)	ECR (until 27 February 2018) EPP
Theresa Griffin	North West England	Labour Party	S&D
Daniel Hannan	South East England	Conservative Party	ECR
Mary Honeyball	London	Labour Party	S&D
Mike Hookem	Yorkshire and the Humber	UKIP	EFDD (until 15 October 2014) NI (until 19 October 2014) EFDD (until 16 January 2019) NI
John Howarth	South East England	Labour Party	S&D
Ian Hudghton	Scotland	Scottish National Party	Greens–EFA
Diane James	South East England	UKIP (until 19 November 2016) Independent (until 4 February 2019) Brexit Party (Note: James was originally elected for UKIP but left the party in November 2016, and joined The Brexit Party in February 2019)	EFDD (until 15 October 2014) NI (until 19 October 2014) EFDD (until 19 November 2016) NI (until 12 December 2018) EFDD
Syed Kamall	London	Conservative Party	ECR
Saj Karim	North West England	Conservative Party	ECR
Wajid Khan	North West England	Labour Party	S&D
Jude Kirton-Darling	North East England	Labour Party	S&D
Jean Lambert	London	Green Party (England and Wales)	Greens–EFA
David Martin	Scotland	Labour Party	S&D
Rupert Matthews	East Midlands	Conservative Party	ECR
Alex Mayer	East of England	Labour Party	S&D
Linda McAvan (Note: McAvan resigned as an MEP on 18 April 2019)	Yorkshire and the Humber	Labour Party	S&D
Emma McClarkin	East Midlands	Conservative Party	ECR
Anthea McIntyre	West Midlands	Conservative Party	ECR
Nosheena Mobarik	Scotland	Conservative Party	ECR
Clare Moody	South West England	Labour Party	S&D
Claude Moraes	London	Labour Party	S&D
Jim Nicholson	Northern Ireland	Ulster Unionist Party	ECR
Paul Nuttall	North West England	UKIP (until 8 December 2018) Independent (until 14 February 2019) Brexit Party (Note: Nuttall was originally elected for UKIP but left the party in December 2018 and joined the Brexit Party in February 2019)	EFDD (until 15 October 2014) NI (until 19 October 2014) EFDD
Patrick O'Flynn	East of England	UKIP (until 26 November 2018) SDP (Note: O'Flynn was originally elected for UKIP but joined the SDP in November 2018)	EFDD (until 15 October 2014) NI (until 19 October 2014) EFDD
Rory Palmer	East Midlands	Labour Party	S&D
Margot Parker	East Midlands	UKIP (until 14 April 2019) Brexit Party (Note: Parker was originally elected for UKIP but left the party in April 2019)	EFDD (until 15 October 2014) NI (until 19 October 2014) EFDD
John Michael Procter	Yorkshire and the Humber	Conservative Party	ECR
Julia Reid	South West England	UKIP (until 7 December 2018) Independent (until 11 February 2019) Brexit Party (Note: Reid was originally elected for UKIP but left the party in December 2018 and joined the Brexit Party in February 2019)	EFDD (until 15 October 2014) NI (until 19 October 2014) EFDD
Molly Scott Cato	South West England	Green Party (England and Wales)	Greens–EFA
Jill Seymour	West Midlands	UKIP (until 14 April 2019) Brexit Party (Note: Seymour was originally elected for UKIP but left the party in April 2019)	EFDD (until 15 October 2014) NI (until 19 October 2014) EFDD
Siôn Simon	West Midlands	Labour Party	S&D
Alyn Smith	Scotland	Scottish National Party	Greens–EFA
Kay Swinburne	Wales	Conservative Party	ECR
Charles Tannock	London	Conservative Party	ECR
Keith Taylor	South East England	Green Party (England and Wales)	Greens–EFA
Geoffrey Van Orden	East of England	Conservative Party	ECR
Derek Vaughan	Wales	Labour Party	S&D
Julie Ward	North West England	Labour Party	S&D
Steven Woolfe	North West England	UKIP (until 17 October 2016) Independent (Note: Woolfe was originally elected for UKIP but left the party in October 2016)	EFDD (until 15 October 2014) NI (until 19 October 2014) EFDD (until 23 October 2016) NI

== Former members ==
Name	Region	Party	Date	Reason for departure
Philip Bradbourn	West Midlands	Conservative Party	19 December 2014	Died in office
Anneliese Dodds	South East England	Labour Party	8 June 2017	Elected MP
Ian Duncan	Scotland	Conservative Party	22 June 2017	Resigned after being created life peer
Vicky Ford	East of England	Conservative Party	8 June 2017	Elected MP
Afzal Khan	North West England	Labour Party	8 June 2017	Elected MP
Timothy Kirkhope	Yorkshire and the Humber	Conservative Party	5 October 2016	Resigned after being created life peer
Andrew Lewer	East Midlands	Conservative Party	8 June 2017	Elected MP
Roger Helmer	East Midlands	UKIP	31 July 2017	Resigned citing age and health status as reasons, but amid allegations of misuse of public funds
Richard Howitt	East of England	Labour Party	2 November 2016	Resigned after taking up chief executive position at International Integrated Reporting Council
Glenis Willmott	East Midlands	Labour Party	2 October 2017	Retired
Catherine Stihler	Scotland	Labour Party	31 January 2019	Retired to take up chief executive post at Open Knowledge International

== See also ==
- 2014 European Parliament election in the United Kingdom
- 2014 European Parliament election
- Parliamentary Groups
