= Helmut Holzapfel =

Helmut Holzapfel may refer to:

- Helmut Holzapfel (tenor)
- Helmut Holzapfel (urban planner)
