= Baroness Foster =

Baroness Foster may refer to:

- Jacqueline Foster, Baroness Foster of Oxton (born 1947), British politician and former Member of the European Parliament
- Arlene Foster, Baroness Foster of Aghadrumsee (born 1970), British broadcaster and former First Minister of Northern Ireland
