= World Transport Policy and Practice =

The Journal of World Transport Policy & Practice (WTPP) is a peer-reviewed academic journal published quarterly since 1995. From 1995-1996 it was housed within Management Consultants Bradford University Press. From 1997-2020 it was housed within Eco-Logica Ltd. Since 2021 it has been hosted by the nonprofit Transportation Choices for Sustainable Communities (TCSC). WTPP's International Standard Serial Number is ISSN 1352-7614

WTPP was founded by John Whitelegg, and has featured a number of studies from researchers such as Vincent Kaufmann, Helmut Holzapfel, Gary Haq, John Whitelegg himself, Peter Newman and many others. The individual articles are listed in USDOT's TRID database (Transportation Research International Documentation).

In 2022, World Transport Policy & Practice was officially trademarked with the United States Patent and Trademark Office (USPTO) (United States trademark registration number is 6891195).

WTPP is listed in Simon Batterbury 's list of Open Access Journal under "Urban studies and planning"
