= North West England (European Parliament constituency) =

Former European Parliament constituency

- European Parliament constituency
- Location among the 2014 constituencies

- Shown within the United Kingdom
- Member state: United Kingdom
- Created: 1999
- Dissolved: 31 January 2020
- MEPs: 10 (1999–2004); 9 (2004–2009); 8 (2009–2020)

North West England was a constituency of the European Parliament. From the 2009 elections it elected 8 MEPs using the D'Hondt method of party-list proportional representation, until the UK exit from the European Union on 31 January 2020.

== Boundaries ==
The constituency corresponded to the North West England region of the United Kingdom, comprising the counties of Cheshire, Cumbria, Greater Manchester, Lancashire and Merseyside.

== History ==
Following the passing of the European Parliamentary Elections Act 1999, the North West of England formed one constituency from which candidates are elected using the D'Hondt method. In the election preceding that Act, MEPs were elected by the first-past-the-post method in single-member constituencies. The constituency corresponded to the following former European constituencies: Cheshire East, Cheshire West and Wirral, Cumbria and Lancashire North, Greater Manchester Central, Greater Manchester East, Greater Manchester West, Lancashire Central, Lancashire South, Merseyside East and Wigan, Merseyside West, and Congleton from Staffordshire West and Congleton.

== Returned members ==
MEPs for North West England, 1999—2020
Election	1999 (5th parliament)	2004 (6th parliament)	2009 (7th parliament)	2014 (8th parliament)		2019 (9th parliament)
MEP Party	Lord Inglewood; Conservative	John Whittaker; UKIP	Paul Nuttall; UKIP (2009–2018); Independent (2018–2019), Brexit Party (2019)			Claire Fox; Brexit Party
MEP Party	Den Dover; Conservative (1999–2008); Independent (2008–2009)		Nick Griffin; BNP	Louise Bours; UKIP (2014–2018); Independent (2018–2019)		Henrik Overgaard-Nielsen; Brexit Party
MEP Party	Sir Robert Atkins; Conservative			Steven Woolfe; UKIP (2014–2016); Independent (2016–2019)		David Bull; Brexit Party
MEP Party	David Sumberg; Conservative		Jacqueline Foster; Conservative			Gina Dowding; Green
MEP Party	Jacqueline Foster; Conservative	Sajjad Karim; LD (2004–2007); Con (2007–2019)	Sajjad Karim; Conservative			Jane Brophy; Liberal Democrats
MEP Party	Chris Davies; Liberal Democrat			M. Afzal Khan; Labour (2014–2017)	Wajid Khan; Labour (2017–2019)	Chris Davies; Liberal Democrats
MEP Party	Terry Wynn; Labour		Brian Simpson; Labour (2006–2014)	Julie Ward; Labour		
MEP Party	Arlene McCarthy; Labour			Theresa Griffin; Labour		
MEP Party	Gary Titley; Labour		Seat abolished			
MEP Party	Brian Simpson; Labour	Seat abolished				

Key to political groups of the European Parliament (UK)
Party			Faction in European Parliament	
Brexit Party	29		Non-Inscrits	57
DUP	1		Non-Inscrits	57
Liberal Democrats	16	17	Renew Europe	108
Alliance	1	17	Renew Europe	108
Green	7	11	Greens–European Free Alliance	75
SNP	3	11	Greens–European Free Alliance	75
Plaid Cymru	1	11	Greens–European Free Alliance	75
Labour	10		Socialists and Democrats	154
Conservative	4		European Conservatives and Reformists Group	62
Sinn Féin	1		European United Left–Nordic Green Left	41
Total	73		Total	750

== Election results ==
Elected candidates are listed in bold. Brackets indicate the order candidates were elected and the number of votes per seat won in their respective columns.

=== 2019 ===
2019 results

European Election 2019: North West England
List	Candidates	Votes	Of total (%)	± from prev.
Brexit Party	**Claire Fox** (1) **Henrik Overgaard-Nielsen** (4) **David Bull** (7) Gary Harvey, Ajay Jagota, Elizabeth Babade, Sally Bate, John Banks	541,843 (180,614)	31.23	New
Labour	**Theresa Griffin** (2) **Julie Ward** (6) Wajid Khan, Erica Lewis, David Brennan, Claire Cozler, Saf Ismail, Yvonne Tennant	380,193 (190,096)	21.91	–11.94
Liberal Democrats	**Chris Davies** (3) **Jane Brophy** (8) Helen Foster-Grime, Anna Fryer, Sam Al-Hamdani, Rebecca Forrest, John Studholme, Frederick Van Mierlo	297,507 (148,753)	17.15	+11.14
Green	**Gina Dowding** (5) Wendy Kay Olsen, Jessica Northey, Geraldine Coggins, Rosie Mills, Astrid Johnson, Daniel Jerrome, James Booth	216,581	12.48	+5.47
Conservative	Sajjad Karim, Kevin Beaty, Jane Howard, Arnold Saunders, Wendy Maisey, Thomas Lord, Anthony Pickles, Attika Choudhary	131,002	7.55	–12.51
UKIP	Adam Richardson, Jeff Armstrong, Fiona Mills, Nathan Ryding, Michael Felse, Ben Fryer, John Booker, Alexander Craig	62,464	3.60	–23.86
Change UK	Andrea Cooper, Dan Price, Arun Banerji, Michael Taylor, Philippa Olive, Victoria Desmond, Andrew Graystone, Elisabeth Knight	47,237	2.72	New
Independent	Tommy Robinson	38,908	2.24	New
English Democrat	Stephen Morris, Valerie Morris	10,045	0.58	–0.53
UKEU	Sophie Larroque	7,125	0.41	New
Independent	Mohammad Aslam	2,002	0.12	New
Turnout		1,744,858	33.11	–0.39

=== 2014 ===
2014 results

European Election 2014: North West England (results)
List	Candidates	Votes	Of total (%)	± from prev.
Labour	**Theresa Griffin** (1) **Afzal Khan** (4) **Julie Ward** (6) Wajid Khan, Angeliki Stogia, Steve Carter, Pascale Lamb, Nick Parnell	594,063 (198,021)	33.9	+13.5
UKIP	**Paul Nuttall** (2) **Louise Bours** (5) **Steven Woolfe**(8) Shneur Odze, Lee Slaughter, Simon Noble, Peter Harper, John Brian Stanyer	481,932 (160,644)	27.5	+11.7
Conservative	**Jacqueline Foster** (3) **Sajjad Karim** (7) Kevin Beaty, Deborah Dunleavy, Joe Barker, Daniel Hamilton, Chris Whiteside, James Walsh	351,985 (175,993)	20.1	−5.5
Green	Peter Cranie, Gina Dowding, Laura Bannister, Jill Perry, John Knight, Ulrike Zeshan, Lewis Coyne, Jake Welsh	123,075	7.0	−0.7
Liberal Democrats	Chris Davies, Helen Foster-Grime, Jo Crotty, Qassim Afzal, Jane Brophy, Sue McGuire, Gordon Lishman, Neil Christian	105,487	6.0	−8.3
BNP	Nick Griffin, Dawn Charlton, Clive Jefferson, Eddy O'Sullivan, Simon Darby, Kay Pollitt, Derek Adams, David O'Loughlin	32,826	1.9	−6.1
An Independence from Europe	Helen Bashford, Gill Kearney, Pauline Penny, Kay Bashford, Faye Raw, Lorna Markovitch, Jennie Ransome, Jill Stockdale	26,731	1.5	New
English Democrat	Stephen Morris, Paul Rimmer, Derek Bullock, Paul Whitelegg, Steve McEllenborough, Laurence Depares, Valarie Morris, Anthony Backhouse	19,522	1.1	−1.3
Pirate	Maria Aretoulaki, George Walkden, Jack Allnutt	8,597	0.5	New
NO2EU	Roger Bannister, George Waterhouse, Jacqueline Grunsell, John Metcalfe, George Tapp, Mark Rowe, James Healy, Kevin Morrison	5,402	0.3	−1.1
Socialist Equality	Chris Marsden, Julie Hyland, Robert Skelton, Lucy Warren, Mark Dowson, Ajitha Gunaratne, Danny Dickinson, Joe Heffer	5,067	0.3	New
Turnout		1,754,687	33.5	+1.8

=== 2009 ===
2009 results

European Election 2009: North West England
List	Candidates	Votes	Of total (%)	± from prev.
Conservative	**Sir Robert Atkins** (1) **Sajjad Karim** (5) **Jacqueline Foster** (7) Alex Williams, Greg Morgan, Tony Samuels, Peter Wilding, Andrew Large	423,174 (141,058)	25.6	+1.4
Labour	**Arlene McCarthy** (2) **Brian Simpson** (6) Theresa Griffin, Stephen Carter, Jane Clarke, Riaz Ahmed, Claire Reynolds, Brian Boag	336,831 (168,415.5)	20.4	−7.0
UKIP	**Paul Nuttall** (3) Michael McManus, Graham Cannon, Nigel Brown, Hilary Jones, Philip Griffiths, Fred McGlade, Terry Durrance	261,740	15.8	+4.1
Liberal Democrats	**Chris Davies** (4) Helen Foster-Grime, Sue McGuire, Qassim Afzal, Neil Corlett, Mark Clayton, Stephen Cooke, Peter Hirst	235,639	14.3	−1.6
BNP	**Nick Griffin** (8) Martin Wingfield, Steve Greenhalgh, Edward O'Sullivan, Jean Purdy, Michael Elliot, Derek Adams, Gary Aronsson	132,194	8.0	+1.6
Green	Peter Cranie, Maria Whitelegg, Ruth Bergan, Samir Chatterjee, Jill Perry, Justine Hall, Margaret Westbrook, Geoff Smith	127,133	7.7	+2.1
English Democrat	Ed Abrams, Stephen Morris, Robert Logan, Derek Grue, Anthony Justice, Maurice Brookes, Valerie Morris, Ken Walters	40,027	2.4	+0.8
Socialist Labour	Billy Kelly, Stephen Whatham, Kai Andersen, Ronald Waugh, Dot Kelly, Lynton Bennett, Dot Entwistle, Michael Perry	26,224	1.6	New
Christian	Hans-Christian Raabe, Jill McLachlan, John Manwell, Maria Overend, Clive Morrison, Bob Ralph, Carol Jules, David Lee Martin	25,999	1.6	New
NO2EU	Roger Bannister, Les Skarrot, Craig Johnston, Alec McFadden, Steve Radford, Lynn Worthington, John Metcalfe, Harry Smith	23,580	1.4	New
Jury Team	Krishnamurty Tayya, Graham Ross, Carl Birchall, William Brotherston, Mary Strickland, Michael Hale	8,783	0.5	New
Libertas	Benjamin Caraduc Tallis, Anthony Butcher, Paul Dabrowa, William Westall, Liam Hemmings, John Humberstone, Michael O'Reilly	6,980	0.4	New
Independent	Francis Apaloo	3,621	0.2	New
Turnout		1,651,825	31.7	−9.2

=== 2004 ===
2004 results

European Election 2004: North West England
List	Candidates	Votes	Of total (%)	± from prev.
Labour	**Gary Titley** (1) **Arlene McCarthy** (4) **Terry Wynn** (7) Brian Simpson, Theresa Griffin, Rosie Cooper, Albert Catterall, Rupa Huq, Ebrahim Adia	576,388 (192,129.33)	27.4	−7.1
Conservative	**Den Dover** (2) **David Sumberg** (6) **Sir Robert Atkins** (8) Jacqueline Foster, David Newns, Alfred Doran, Eveleigh Dutton, Leslie Byrom, James Mawdsley	509,446 (169,815.33)	24.2	−11.2
Liberal Democrats	**Chris Davies** (3) **Saj Karim** (9) Flo Clucas, Qassim Afzal, Stan Collins, Allison Seabourne, Paula Keaveney, Neil Corlett, Alison Firth	335,063 (167,531.5)	15.9	+4.2
UKIP	**John Whittaker** (5) Gregg Beaman, John Browne, Gerald Kelley, Alan Weddell, Stephen Roxborough, Richard Buttrey, Graham Cannon, Roy Hopwood	257,158	11.7	+5.1
BNP	Nick Griffin, Martin Wingfield, Anthony Jones, Patricia Thomson, David Joines, Ralph Ellis, Richard Chadfield, Anita Corbett, Barry Birks	134,959	6.4	+5.1
Green	John Whitelegg, Gina Dowding, Spencer Fitz-Gibbon, Kay Roney, Peter Cranie, Vernon Marshall, Vanessa Hall, Kenneth McIver, James Craig	117,393	5.6	0.0
Liberal	Steve Radford, David Green, Hazel Williams, Philip Burke, Christopher Lenton, Christopher Barnes, Michael Butler, Robin Radnell, Daniel Wood	96,325	4.6	+2.4
English Democrat	Christine Constable, Mark Wheatley, Julia Howman, Stephen Pipe, Lauren Spratt, Phillip Evans, Robert Abrams	34,110	1.6	New
Respect	Michael Lavalette, Ahmed Hadi, Sabiha Vorajee, Alexander McFadden, Stephen Metcalfe, Madeline Heneghan, Richard Searle, Edna Greenwood, Susan Mary Bond	24,636	1.2	New
Countryside	Rodney Black, Richard Malbon, Richard Ormrod, Kevin Tomkinson	11,283	0.5	New
ProLife Alliance	Fiona Pinto, Julia Millington, Kathleen Delarmi, Rosanne Allen, Fiona Daly	10,084	0.5	New
Independent	Ronald Alan Neal	8,318	0.4	New
Turnout		2,115,163	40.9	+21.2

=== 1999 ===
1999 results

European Election 1999: North West England
List	Candidates	Votes	Of total (%)	± from prev.
Conservative	**Lord Inglewood** (1) **Sir Robert Atkins** (3) **David Sumberg** (5) **Den Dover** (8) **Jacqueline Foster** (10) David Newns, Andrew Reid, Leslie Byrom, Christopher Lynch, Paul Brierley	360,027 (72,005.4)	35.4	
Labour	**Arlene McCarthy** (2) **Gary Titley** (4) **Terry Wynn** (7) **Brian Simpson** (9) Tony Cunningham, Mark Hendrick, Ruth Turner, Claire Nangle, Michael Ward, Theresa Griffin	350,511 (87,627.75)	34.5	
Liberal Democrats	**Chris Davies** (6) Flo Clucas, Tim Farron, Patsy Calton, Roger Putnam, Yasmin Zalzala, Kiron Reid, Kate Fletcher, Mark Clayton, Jackie Pearcey	119,376	11.7	
UKIP	John Whittaker, Gerald Kelley, Roger Bullock, Gordon Black, Mona McNee, Mark Adams, Valerie Cowell, Graham Cannon, Alan Weddell, John Tomlin	66,779	6.6	
Green	John Whitelegg, Spencer Fitz-Gibbon, Chris Busby, Robin Field, Lance Crookes, Gina Dowding, Julian Parry, Geoffrey Nicholls, Jenny Jones, Joy Hogg	56,828	5.6	
Liberal	Michael Meadowcroft, Steve Radford, David Green, Philip Burke, Gary Copeland, Colin Paisley, Hazel Williams, Susan Ashton, Alison Micklem, Paul Woodruff	22,640	2.2	
BNP	Christian Jackson, Roger Wood, David Blezard, Michael Cope, Mark Dodd, Lee Barnes, Anthony Hodson, William Hitches, Brian Winn, Geoffrey Barnes	13,587	1.3	
Socialist Labour	William Kelly, Gias Choudhury, Alec McFadden, Lynne Lowe, Ali Mehmood, James Hackett, Steven Wynn, Jim Dooher, Michael Perry, Terence Cullen	11,338	1.1	
Pro-Euro Conservative	Andrew Pearce, Janet Terras, Paul Bennetts, Andrew Zsigmund, Edward Pearce, Jane Baines, Tim Coppinger, Graham Perkins, Linda Callaghan, Barry Hardcastle	9,816	1.0	
Anti-Corruption Pro-Family Christian Alliance	David Braid	2,251	0.2	
Natural Law	John Collins, Dinah Grice, Peter Leadbetter, Deborah Wright, William Hite, Bryan Irving, Bibette Leadbetter, Simon Cohen, Geoffrey Gay, Anne Marie Scott	2,114	0.2	
English Independent Humanist Party	Douglas Firkin-Flood	1,049	0.1	
Communist Party of Great Britain (Provisional Central Committee)	John Pearson, Roger Harper, Philip Watson, Stephen Riley, Edward Rowlands, Thomas May, Daniel Hammill, Daniel Bowles	878	0.1	
Turnout		1,017,194	19.7	
