= Steve Crowther =

British politician (born 1957)

Stephen Crowther
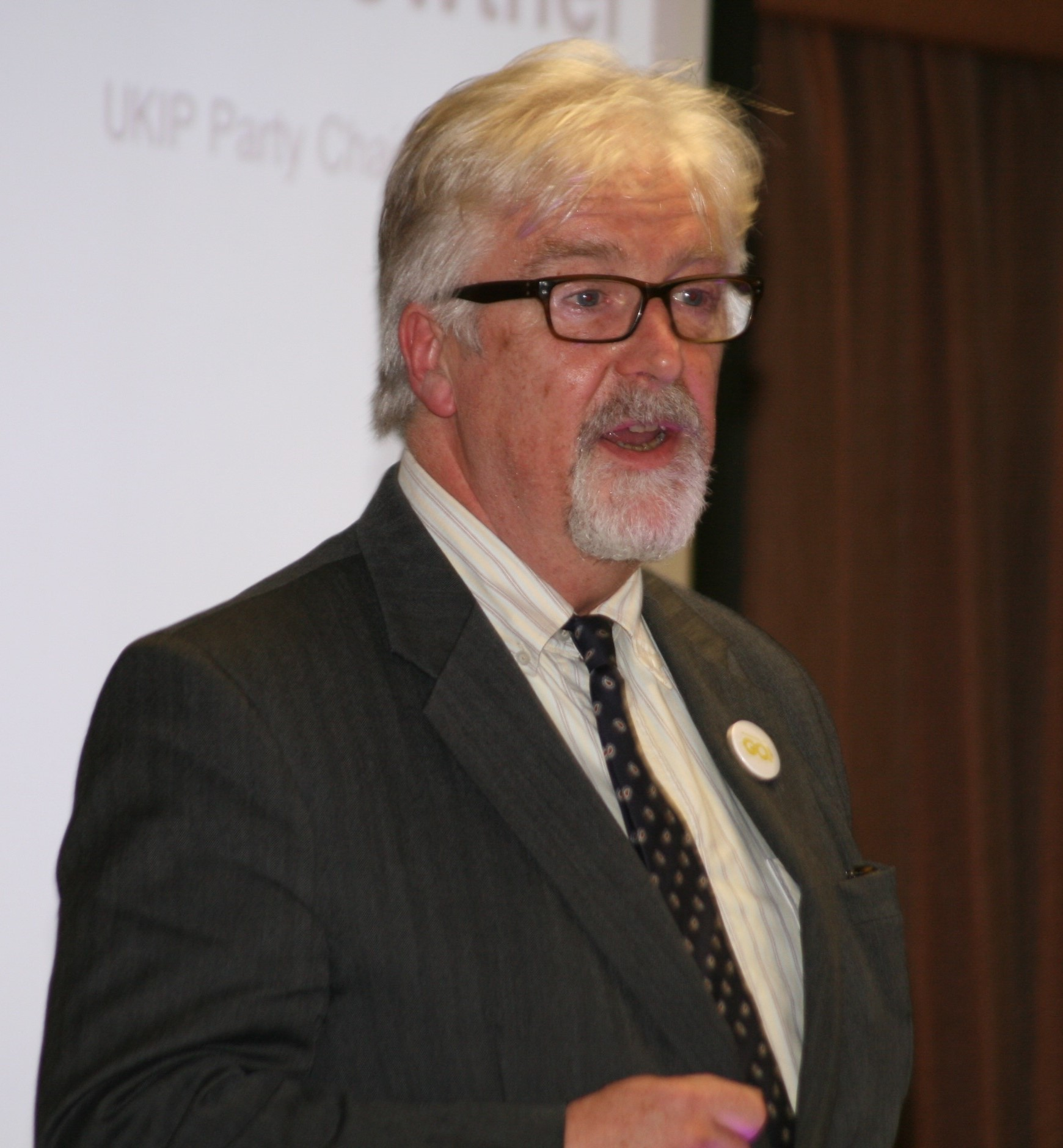

Leader of the UK Independence Party
- Acting; 9 June 2017 – 29 September 2017
- Deputy: Peter Whittle
- Preceded by: Paul Nuttall
- Succeeded by: Henry Bolton

Chair of the UK Independence Party
- In office 8 November 2010 – 5 July 2016
- Leader: Nigel Farage
- Preceded by: Paul Nuttall
- Succeeded by: Paul Oakden

Personal details
- Born: January 1957 (age 69)
- Party: UK Independence Party (until 2018)

Stephen James Crowther (born January 1957) is a former acting leader of the UK Independence Party (UKIP). On 9 June 2017, he succeeded Paul Nuttall who stepped down after the party failed to win any seats in the 2017 UK general election.

Crowther had previously been UKIP party chairman, a position from which he resigned in July 2016 a few weeks after the EU referendum. In 2014, as part of UKIP's efforts to avoid growing embarrassment from online racist comments by members, he advised members not to join Facebook or Twitter.

In late 2015, he was called the "absentee Chairman" by Matt Goodwin in his sequel book on the history of UKIP.

Crowther has been the UKIP candidate for North Devon three times. In the 2017 general election he polled the second-fewest votes in the constituency. He is a retired trade journalist and writer who ran an advertising agency in London. Considered as an interim leader of UKIP, Crowther said he would launch the process for the election of a more permanent party leader.

He resigned from UKIP in December 2018.

== Elections contested ==
UK Parliament elections

Date	Constituency	Party	Votes	% votes
2010	North Devon	UKIP	3,720	7.2
2015	North Devon	UKIP	7,719	14.8
2017	North Devon	UKIP	1,187	2.1

Party political offices
Preceded by Paul Nuttall	Chair of the UK Independence Party; 2010–2016	Succeeded by Paul Oakden
Preceded by Paul Nuttall	Leader of the UK Independence Party; Acting; 2017	Succeeded by Henry Bolton
