= Henrik Overgaard-Nielsen =

British-Danish dentist and politician (born 1959)

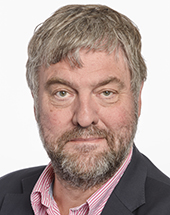

Member of the European Parliament for North West England
- In office 2 July 2019 – 31 January 2020
- Preceded by: Louise Bours
- Succeeded by: Constituency abolished

Personal details
- Born: 2 August 1959 (age 67) Frederiksberg, Denmark
- Party: Brexit (UK); People's Movement against the EU and June Movement (Denmark)
- Spouse: Sharon Bierer
- Children: 2
- Education: University of Copenhagen
- Occupation: Dentist

Henrik Eyser Overgaard-Nielsen (born 2 August 1959) is a British-Danish dentist and politician who served as a Brexit Party Member of the European Parliament (MEP) for the North West of England between 2019 and the United Kingdom's withdrawal from the EU on 31 January 2020.

== Early life ==
Henrik Eyser Overgaard-Nielsen was born in Denmark. His father was a leading campaigner against Denmark joining the European Economic Community, which it did in 1973. He was active in the June Movement and one of the leaders of the successful no-campaign at the Danish referendum on the Maastricht Treaty in 1992. He qualified as a dentist in Copenhagen in 1983.

== Dental career ==
Overgaard-Nielsen is GDP who started NHS Dentist, an NHS dental practice in Fulham, London in 1999. The practice was started with Sharon Bierer, his British-born wife.

In 2013, following a 2012 holiday in the country, Overgaard-Nielsen and Bierer founded a charity, Burmadent, to provide dental services in the Inle Lake area of Myanmar (Burma).

In 2015, Overgaard-Nielsen was elected as the chair of the General Dental Practice Committee (GDPC) of the British Dental Association (BDA), having previously been the vice chair. He was re-elected in January 2019.

== Political career ==
Overgaard-Nielsen has been an active opponent of the EU since the late 1970s, first in the People's Movement against the EU and later in the June Movement. In 1992, Overgaard-Nielsen was co-chairman of the "No" campaign in the Danish referendum on the Maastricht Treaty.

In April 2019, Overgaard-Nielsen was announced as a Brexit Party Member of the European Parliament (MEP) candidate for the North West of England. He subsequently won his seat in the 2019 European Parliament election.

Overgaard-Nielsen considers himself to be a socialist, in 2020 booklet Reclaiming Democracy: The Left Case for Sovereignty that he co-authored with fellow Brexit Party MEP Claire Fox, he said that when he campaigned against the Maastricht Treaty in his native Denmark in 1992, "the 'No' side was dominated by socialists and supported by intellectual and artistic elites", but when he moved to the UK in 1996, he found the Euroscepticism there anchored on the right and far-right, while the intelligentsia was mostly pro-EU. He explained his left-wing eurosceptic views by saying that "The EU is rooted in four holy ‘pillars’: unregulated movement of capital, goods, labour and services. The most ardent cheerleaders for these freedoms are large multinational corporations, lobbyists and the middle-class establishment."

== Personal life ==
Overgaard-Nielsen is married to Sharon Bierer, who is British. They have two children, and he divides his time between a home in London and one near Ostuni, Apulia, Italy. Their daughter, Laura Bierer-Nielsen, is director of policy and research at Labour Leave, a pro-Brexit campaigning group largely funded by Conservative Party donors.

In October 2020, Overgaard-Nielsen became a British citizen.
