= Brian Simpson (politician) =

British politician, MEP (born 1953)

Brian Simpson OBE
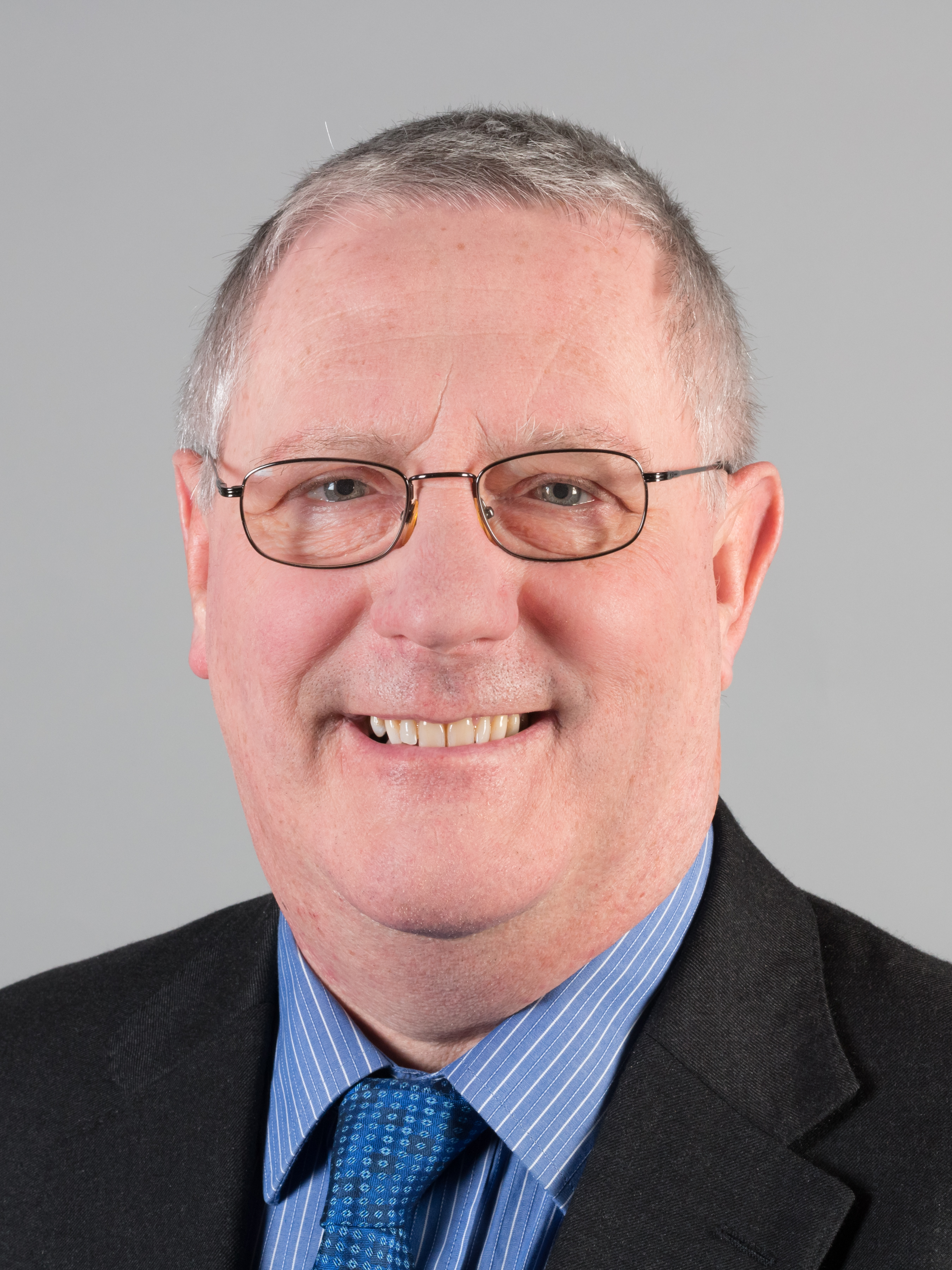
- Brian Simpson, 2014

Member of the European Parliament for North West England
- In office 2006 – 1 July 2014
- Preceded by: Terry Wynn
- Succeeded by: Julie Ward

Personal details
- Born: 6 February 1953 (age 73)
- Party: Labour

Brian Simpson OBE (born 6 February 1953) is a British Labour Party politician who was Member of the European Parliament (MEP) for North West England.

Born in Leigh, Lancashire, Simpson was educated at the West Midlands College of Education and became a teacher. He also joined the Labour Party, serving on Merseyside County Council from 1981 until 1986, and then on Warrington Borough Council from 1987.

Simpson was a member of the European Parliament from 1989 until 1999 representing Cheshire East and from 1999 until 2004 representing the North West Region, when European Elections switched from First Past the Post to the List System. He lost his seat at the 2004 European Parliamentary Elections. He returned to the European Parliament in September 2006 and was re-elected again in 2009.

He was the president of the European Parliaments Transport and Tourism Committee after serving as the Socialist Group Spokesperson on that committee for many years. He was also a substitute member and Labour spokesperson on the Committee on Agriculture and Rural Development. He was also a full member of the European Parliament Delegation for relations with Australia and New Zealand as well as a substitute on the Delegation for relations with the Andean Community.

In the Committee on Transport and Tourism he worked as the Socialist Group shadow draftsperson on the European Commission proposals on the full accomplishment of the internal market of Community postal services, safety on the community's railways, and is accepted as being one of the senior members of that committee dealing with Civil Aviation matters. In 2010 and 2012 he was voted Transport MEP of the year by Parliament Magazine.

Before being elected an MEP he worked as a PE teacher in Liverpool and was a county councillor for Merseyside County Council, a member of the Merseyside Police Authority, deputy chair of the Liverpool Airport and councillor at Warrington Borough Council. In this last position he held the post of deputy chair of finance and chair of the Performance and Policy Review Unit. During the brief period from 2004 to 2006 that he was out of Parliament, he became director of the North West Rail Campaign. The son of John Simpson and Freda Simpson (née Mort), he was educated at Golborne Primary School and Golborne Comprehensive School (Wigan Education Authority), before going onto West Midlands College to train as a physical education teacher.

He was appointed Officer of the Order of the British Empire (OBE) in the 2015 New Year Honours "for Parliamentary and Political services."
