= 2002 Sefton Metropolitan Borough Council election =

2002 UK local government election

Elections to Sefton Metropolitan Borough Council were held on 2 May 2002. One third of the council was up for election and the council stayed under no overall control.

After the election, the composition of the council was:

- Labour 26
- Liberal Democrat 21
- Conservative 16
- Southport Party 3

== Election result ==
Sefton local election result 2002
Party	Seats	Gains	Losses	Net gain/loss	Seats %	Votes %	Votes	+/−
Labour	9			+3	39.1	31.7	22,547	
Liberal Democrats	6			-4	26.1	28.8	20,455	
Conservative	5			-2	21.7	25.1	17,832	
Southport Party	3			+3	13.0	11.3	8,007	
Socialist Alternative	0			0	0	1.2	822	
Green	0			0	0	1.1	750	
Independent	0			0	0	0.7	491	
BNP	0			0	0	0.2	159	

== Ward results ==
Ainsdale
Party	Candidate	Votes	%	±%
Conservative	Michael Ridge	1,831	46.2	
Liberal Democrats	Carla Hayde	1,002	25.3	
Southport Party	John Leech	866	21.9	
Labour	Linda Cluskey	196	4.9	
Green	Laurence Rankin	68	1.7	
Majority		829	20.9	
Turnout		3,963		

Birkdale (2)
Party	Candidate	Votes	%	±%
Liberal Democrats	Iain Brodie-Browne	1,376		
Liberal Democrats	Mary Dally	1,275		
Conservative	Ralph Gregson	1,157		
Southport Party	Richard Chapman	976		
Conservative	Jeremy Myers	887		
Labour	James Baldwin	284		
Green	William Bethnuin	272		
Independent	Terry Durrance	257		
Labour	David Stott	236		
Turnout		6,720		

Blundellsands
Party	Candidate	Votes	%	±%
Conservative	Robert Roberts	1,770	50.9	
Labour	Pamela Parry	1,166	33.6	
Liberal Democrats	William Brereton	539	15.5	
Majority		604	17.3	
Turnout		3,475		

Cambridge
Party	Candidate	Votes	%	±%
Southport Party	David Cobham	1,345	36.7	
Conservative	Robert Price	1,336	36.4	
Liberal Democrats	Clive Dally	733	20.0	
Labour	Patricia Maher	255	7.0	
Majority		9	0.3	
Turnout		3,669		

Church
Party	Candidate	Votes	%	±%
Labour	Carol Gustafson	1,468	47.1	
Liberal Democrats	Pauline Kehoe	1,444	46.4	
Conservative	James Patterson	203	6.5	
Majority		24	0.7	
Turnout		3,115		

Derby
Party	Candidate	Votes	%	±%
Labour	John Rice	1,681	77.9	
Conservative	Paul Nuttall	245	11.4	
Liberal Democrats	Dennis Cross	232	10.8	
Majority		1,436	66.5	
Turnout		2,158		

Dukes
Party	Candidate	Votes	%	±%
Conservative	Ronald Watson	1,386	40.1	
Southport Party	David McLaughlan	1,083	31.3	
Liberal Democrats	Mary Shavaksha	658	19.0	
Labour	Christopher Holmes	239	6.9	
Green	Lola Sieve	89	2.6	
Majority		303	8.8	
Turnout		3,455		

Ford
Party	Candidate	Votes	%	±%
Labour	Ian Moncur	1,828	78.4	
Liberal Democrats	Garry Fielding	503	21.6	
Majority		1,325	56.8	
Turnout		2,331		

Harington
Party	Candidate	Votes	%	±%
Conservative	Sydney Whitby	1,918	54.4	
Labour	Maurice Newton	888	25.2	
Liberal Democrats	Druscilla Haydon	722	20.5	
Majority		1,030	29.2	
Turnout		3,528		

Kew
Party	Candidate	Votes	%	±%
Southport Party	James Grundy	1,271	42.7	
Liberal Democrats	David Bamber	838	28.2	
Conservative	John Lyon-Taylor	470	15.8	
Labour	Stephen Jowett	290	9.8	
Green	John Glendenning	105	3.5	
Majority		433	14.5	
Turnout		2,974		

Linacre
Party	Candidate	Votes	%	±%
Labour	Gordon Friel	1,463	83.1	
Liberal Democrats	Richard Williams	298	16.9	
Majority		1,165	66.2	
Turnout		1,761		

Litherland
Party	Candidate	Votes	%	±%
Labour	Paul Tweed	1,411	80.1	
Liberal Democrats	James Murray	351	19.9	
Majority		1,060	60.2	
Turnout		1,762		

Manor
Party	Candidate	Votes	%	±%
Labour	Michael Jakub	1,750	47.7	
Conservative	Peter Papworth	1,249	34.1	
Liberal Democrats	Edward Firth	540	14.7	
Independent	Robert Wright	126	3.4	
Majority		501	13.6	
Turnout		3,665		

Meols
Party	Candidate	Votes	%	±%
Southport Party	Margaret Brown	1,318	33.2	
Liberal Democrats	James Tattersall	1,272	32.1	
Conservative	Jamie Halsall	1,159	29.2	
Labour	John Seale	218	5.5	
Majority		46	1.1	
Turnout		3,967		

Molyneux
Party	Candidate	Votes	%	±%
Liberal Democrats	Jack Colbert	1,342	39.9	
Labour	Timothy Hale	1,238	36.8	
Conservative	Alan Brown	785	23.3	
Majority		104	3.1	
Turnout		3,365		

Netherton and Orrell
Party	Candidate	Votes	%	±%
Labour	David Martin	1,510	58.3	
Socialist Alternative	Peter Glover	822	31.8	
Liberal Democrats	Hilary Cross	256	9.9	
Majority		688	26.5	
Turnout		2,588		

Norwood
Party	Candidate	Votes	%	±%
Liberal Democrats	David Sumner	1,164	33.8	
Southport Party	Geoffrey Wright	1,148	33.4	
Conservative	Mark Bigley	619	18.0	
Labour	Constance McCarthy	350	10.2	
BNP	Michael McDermott	159	4.6	
Majority		16	0.4	
Turnout		3,440		

Park
Party	Candidate	Votes	%	±%
Liberal Democrats	Robbie Fenton	2,199	71.5	
Labour	Sandra Williams	659	21.4	
Green	Andrew Hoban	216	7.0	
Majority		1,540	50.1	
Turnout		3,074		

Ravenmeols
Party	Candidate	Votes	%	±%
Conservative	Vincent Platt	1,663	50.6	
Labour	Paul Flodman	1,243	37.8	
Liberal Democrats	Timothy Drake	379	11.5	
Majority		420	12.8	
Turnout		3,285		

St Oswald
Party	Candidate	Votes	%	±%
Labour	William Burke	2,117	84.5	
Liberal Democrats	Sara Murray	388	15.5	
Majority		1,729	69.0	
Turnout		2,505		

Sudell
Party	Candidate	Votes	%	±%
Liberal Democrats	Roy Connell	1,729	53.6	
Labour	Stephen Kermode	795	24.7	
Conservative	William Newton	592	18.4	
Independent	David Jones	108	3.3	
Majority		934	28.9	
Turnout		3,224		

Victoria
Party	Candidate	Votes	%	±%
Labour	Giles Blundell	1,262	41.5	
Liberal Democrats	Andrew Tonkiss	1,215	40.0	
Conservative	Theresa Rossiter	562	18.5	
Majority		47	1.5	
Turnout		3,039		
