= The Salesian Academy of St John Bosco =

Location
- Netherton Way; Bootle, Merseyside, L30 2NA; 53.47444°N 2.97673°W

Information
- Type: Academy
- Religious affiliation: Roman Catholic
- Established: 1966
- Local authority: Sefton Council
- Trust: Pope Francis Multi Academy Trust
- Department for Education URN: 149486 Tables
- Ofsted: Reports
- Headteacher: Sue Bourgade
- Gender: Coeducational
- Age: 11 to 16
- Enrolment: 518 (2025)

The Salesian Academy of St John Bosco (formerly known as Salesian College Grammar School, Savio Catholic High School and then Savio Salesian College) is a Roman Catholic secondary school in Bootle, Merseyside, England. The school is under the care of the Salesians of Don Bosco and had about 520 pupils on roll as of 2025.

== History ==
=== Early history ===
The school opened in September 1964 as Salesian College of St. John Bosco and sometimes known as Salesian College Grammar School for Boys, and was the first Roman Catholic grammar school in Bootle. They first cohort of approximately 70 pupils were housed in the former St Martins School on Stanley Road, Bootle. The first and second year pupils moved to the new school building on 2 May 1966. The building project began in April 1963 and cost around £398,000. The college was blessed by Rev. Augustine Harris, Auxiliary Bishop of Liverpool.

On 2 December 1971, an explosion in the school's boiler room shook the entire school and nearby houses, with debris crashing onto the school playground. The two boilermen, who were removing oil from the tanks, escaped just seconds before the boiler room was wrecked by "a fierce explosion". The explosion, caused by escaping gases from storage tanks, extensively damaged the boiler room, although the school was able to reopen the following Monday after repairs were undertaken over the weekend.

=== Later history ===
The school underwent a three-year £2 million refurbishment and rebuilding programme and was reopened in October 1990, with improvements including a new sports hall. After being established in 1966, the school celebrated its 25th anniversary in September 1991. In November 1993, the school was listed as having the worst rate of truancy within Merseyside, rating 14th nationally, although teachers disputed the findings by suggesting that the numbers are open to distortion by schools themselves.

The school was successful in early 2006 to secure a bid for specialist Business & Enterprise status.

Previously a voluntary aided school administered by Sefton Council, in February 2023 Savio Salesian College converted to academy status and was renamed The Salesian Academy of St John Bosco. The school is now sponsored by the Pope Francis Multi Academy Trust, but continues to be under the jurisdiction of the Roman Catholic Archdiocese of Liverpool. As of April 2025, there were just over 500 students on roll, of which just over half were eligible for free school meals.

== Notable former pupils ==
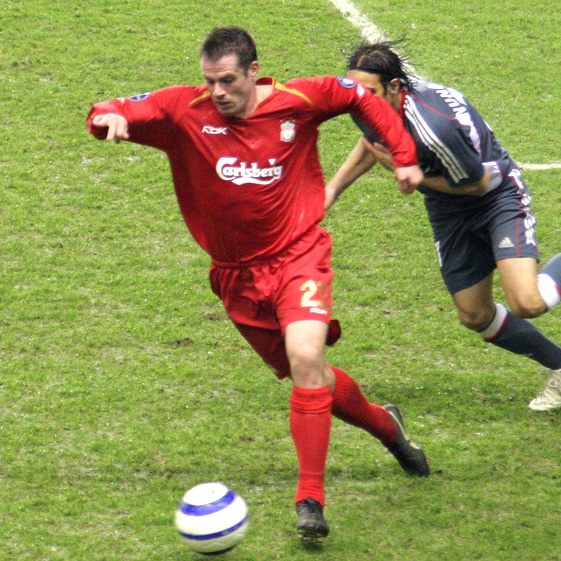
Former Liverpool F.C. and England national football team defender Jamie Carragher

- Owen Brown (b. 1960) - footballer, Tranmere Rovers F.C.
- Mick Halsall (b. 1961) - footballer, Peterborough United F.C.
- Mark Seagraves (b. 1966) - footballer, Bolton Wanderers F.C.
- Paul Nuttall (b. 1976) - politician UKIP MEP
- Jamie Carragher (b. 1978) - footballer, Liverpool F.C., England national football team
- Alex Greenwood (b. 1993) - footballer, Manchester City W.F.C., England women's national football team
