= Helmut Holzapfel (urban planner) =

German academic (born 1950)

Helmut Holzapfel (born 1950 in Göttingen, Germany) is a German scientist. He is Professor of Transportation Planning at University of Kassel, Germany.

He studied Civil Engineering, Transportation Science and Urban Planning between 1968 and 1975 and completed his doctoral thesis, 'Trip Relationships in Urban Areas', in 1980.

== Academic career ==
Helmut Holzapfel is a civil engineer, transportation scientist and urban planner, but he was working in very different fields from his original education as well: So he worked on human lifestyles, computing and reality, strollology (the science of strolling and perspective, invented by Lucius Burckhardt) and many other interdisciplinary topics as well. Since 1993, he has been a professor at the faculty of Architecture, Urban and Landscape Planning at the University of Kassel. From 2005 until 2008 he was dean of the faculty. Since 2009 he has led the research project 'Sintropher' in close collaboration with Sir Peter Hall (urbanist). Cooperation on several projects has been also taking place with John Whitelegg. He is also co-editor of the transport planning journal 'World Transport Policy and Practice' and a member of the scientific advisory board of the Berlin-based Institute for Ecological Economy Research (IÖW).

2015 Holzapfel became head of the Centre for Mobility Culture in Kassel, Germany. Since 2016 he is member of the "Advisory Board" of the project CREATE (Congestion Reduction in Europe, Advancing Transport Efficiency). Between 2013 and 2023 Holzapfel was Member of the Advisory Board for Integrity & Sustainability of Mercedes (source: https://group.mercedes-benz.com/responsibility/compliance/integrity/10-years-advisory-board-for-integrity.html)

== Politics ==
From 1985 until 1993 he was a government official at the Transport Ministry of North Rhine-Westphalia. Between 1995 and 1998 Holzapfel was the highest transport official in the German state of Saxony-Anhalt.

== Publications ==
- Holzapfel, H. (1980): Trip Relationships in Urban Areas, Gateshead.
- Holzapfel, H. and Whitelegg, J. (1993): The conquest of distance by the destruction of time. In: Whitelegg / Hultén / Flink, Leeds.
- Holzapfel, H. (2010): Everywhere and nowhere. In: Le Monde diplomatique, May 2010, Paris.
- Holzapfel, H. (2012): The city that came out of the shadows. In: Town & Country Planning, 03.2012, London.
- Holzapfel, H. (2015): Urbanism and Transport; Building Blocks for Architects and City and Transport Planners, New York and Abingdon (Oxon).
- Holzapfel, H. (2015): Foodstuffs in transit: an ecological disaster! In: World Transport Policy and Practice, Volume 21.3, October 2015, York.
- Holzapfel, H. and Meyfahrt, R. (2015): The Regional Tram-Train of Kassel, Germany; How Regional Responsibility Leads to Local Success. In: Hickman, R. et al. (eds.); Handbook on Transport and Development (pp. 630–645), Cheltenham.
