= Louise Bours =

British independent politician

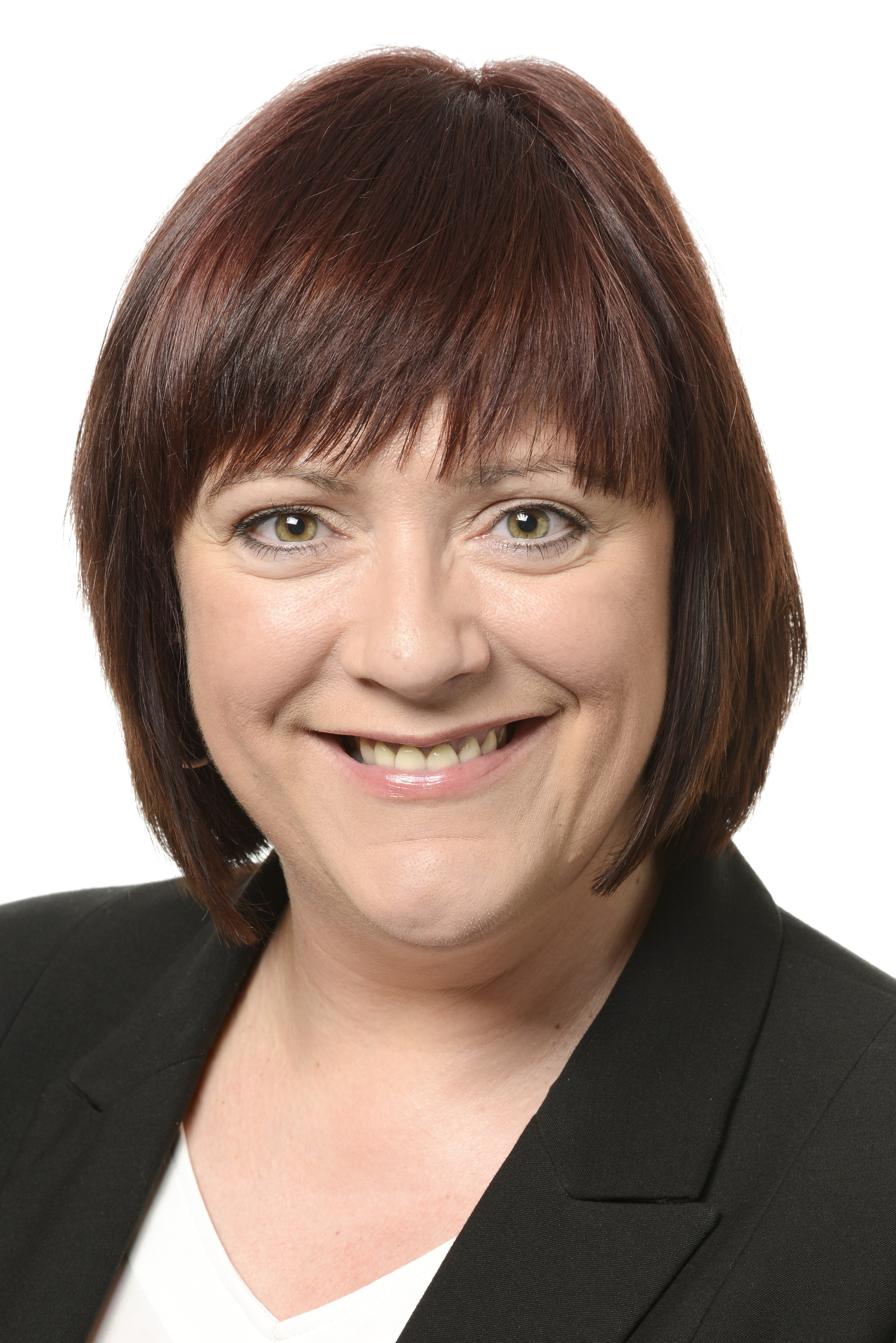

UKIP Health Spokesperson
- In office 24 July 2014 – 16 September 2016
- Leader: Nigel Farage
- Preceded by: Position established
- Succeeded by: Suzanne Evans

Member of the European Parliament for North West England
- In office 1 July 2014 – 1 July 2019
- Preceded by: Nick Griffin
- Succeeded by: Henrik Overgaard-Nielsen

Personal details
- Born: 23 December 1968 (age 57) Congleton, Cheshire, England
- Party: Independent (2018 - present); UK Independence Party (Until 2018)
- Children: 2
- Education: UCBC

Louise Bours (born 23 December 1968), also known as Louise van de Bours, is a former Member of the European Parliament (MEP) for the North West England region. She was elected in 2014 as a UK Independence Party candidate but resigned from the party in 2018, and sat as an independent until she stood down at the 2019 election.

== Background ==
Bours' father is Dutch. She trained as an actress and singer at Mountview Academy of Theatre Arts. She was also a member of the D'Oyly Carte Opera Company from year 2000, and a resident at the Savoy Theatre in London. She went on to appear in Brookside, Peak Practice and Band of Gold and musicals and fronted 1940s-style big bands. However, Bours has said she "retired from showbusiness" in order to concentrate on politics. Bours is a single mother to two children.

Louise Bours used her surname "van de Bours" as late as August 2013, in her LinkedIn profile discussing her musical career, but later dropped the "van de" and appeared as "Louise Bours" on UKIP's MEP party list in 2013. The tussenvoegsel in her name was allegedly more of a stage name than a legal name, according to the Huffington Post.

== Political career ==
Bours previously served as a Conservative councillor on Congleton borough and town councils and was elected mayor in 2006. In January 2015, Bours was disqualified as a member of Congleton town council after more than six months of non-attendance. Despite receiving a salary of £80,000 from the European Parliament following the Brexit referendum, Bours' voting record in the EU parliament dropped by 22.6% to just 43.09% overall. Only fellow UKIP MEP Paul Nuttall and three other MEPs had a lower turnout in the entire European Parliament.

In 2012, she stood as UKIP's candidate in the Police and Crime Commissioner elections for Cheshire Constabulary, coming fifth with 7.86% of the vote.

As an MEP she served as UKIP health spokesperson, and came into opposition with former leader Nigel Farage on health issues; in particular Bours supports the principle of a free NHS, the English smoking ban and plain tobacco packaging, in opposition to Farage. However, Bours has opposed EU tax increases on electronic cigarettes, describing the proposals as "an act of sheer folly". Bours also opposes the Transatlantic Trade and Investment Partnership due to the impacts it would have on the NHS, saying in 2014 that: "TTIP is there for the benefit of one thing only — big business. I've got a message for Len McCluskey and Unite. UKIP will fight alongside you to ensure the NHS is excluded from this agreement."

Bours appeared on Question Time discussing her role as health spokesperson.

In November 2018, Bours resigned from UKIP. She sat as an independent MEP in the Europe of Freedom and Direct Democracy group, until the 2019 EU election.

== Elections ==
Bours previously served as councillor for Congleton borough and town councils and was elected mayor in 2006.

=== European Parliament elections 2014 ===
On 25 May 2014, Bours was elected as MEP for the North West England, replacing British National Party leader Nick Griffin. She has said that she wants to "shake off the BNP in blazers thing", for UKIP and it has been claimed that she has teamed up with UKIP MEP Paul Nuttall in the north-west, which was "a particular cause of anger" within the party according to former UKIP members, who accused them of forming part of a "cosy cartel".

=== General election 2015 ===
In the 2015 general election, she stood for parliament for the Knowsley constituency. Bours came second with 9.8% of the vote, keeping her deposit.

== See also ==
- Euroscepticism
