= Julie Ward (politician) =

British politician

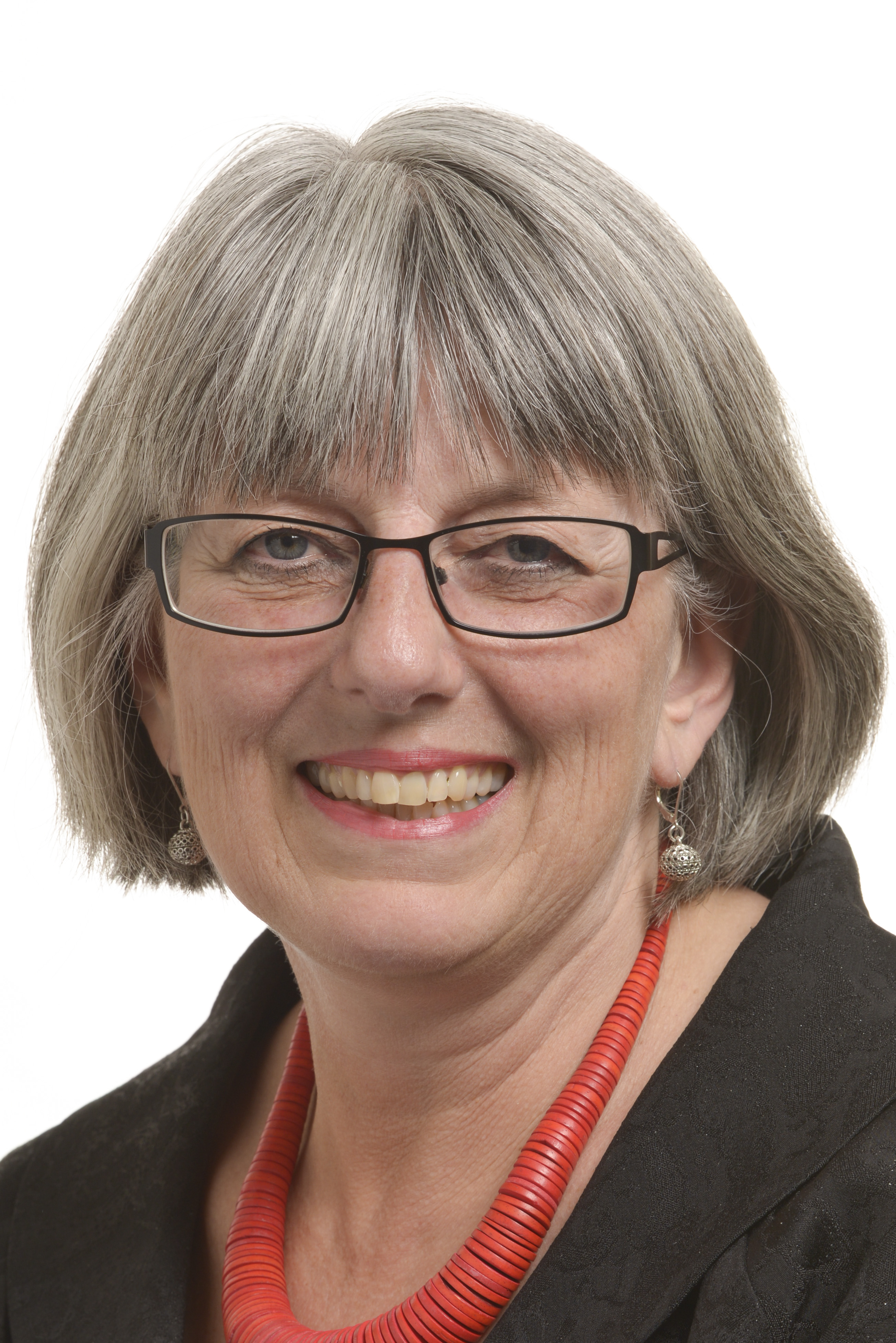

Member of the European Parliament for North West England
- In office 22 May 2014 – 31 January 2020
- Preceded by: Brian Simpson
- Succeeded by: Constituency abolished

Personal details
- Born: 7 March 1957 (age 69) Ripon, West Riding of Yorkshire, England
- Party: Labour
- Education: Newcastle University
- Website: Archived 2017-06-11 at the Wayback Machine

Julie Carolyn Ward (born 7 March 1957) is a British politician who served as a Member of the European Parliament for the North West England region for the Labour Party from 2014 to 2020.

== Career ==
Ward has a master's degree in Education and International Development from Newcastle University, graduating from an adult learning course in 2012. Before being elected as an MEP, she was part of an international delegation to Belfast to discuss the role of the arts in peace processes and also ran a social enterprise.

In 2016 she wrote that Turkey was "becoming a fascist state".

Ward organises events for One Billion Rising, campaigns against violence against women, and is an opponent of Brexit. In 2018 she joined in launching a campaign group, "Left against Brexit", seeking to change the Labour Party's position to supporting membership of the EU. Julie is currently a member of Open Labour’s National Committee.

== European Parliament ==
Ward was third on the Labour Party list for the European Parliament in the May 2014 election, and was elected with Labour taking a third seat from the Lib Dems in the North West England region. At the May 2019 election, Ward was second on the Labour party list for the North West, after Theresa Griffin, and both were elected, while the third Labour seat was lost, with the party's vote falling from 33.9to 21.9 per cent.

=== Committee and delegations memberships ===
As of 2014, Ward was a member of one European Parliament Committee, the Committee on Culture and Education, and also of one Delegation, that on International relations with Bosnia and Herzegovina, and Kosovo. She was also a substitute member for the Committee on Regional Development, the Committee on Women's Rights and Gender Equality, and the Delegation to the ACP-EU Joint Parliamentary Assembly, meaning that she could take the place of another socialist group member on occasions.
