= Wajid Khan, Baron Khan of Burnley =

British politician (born 1979)

The Right Honourable The Lord Khan of Burnley FHEA
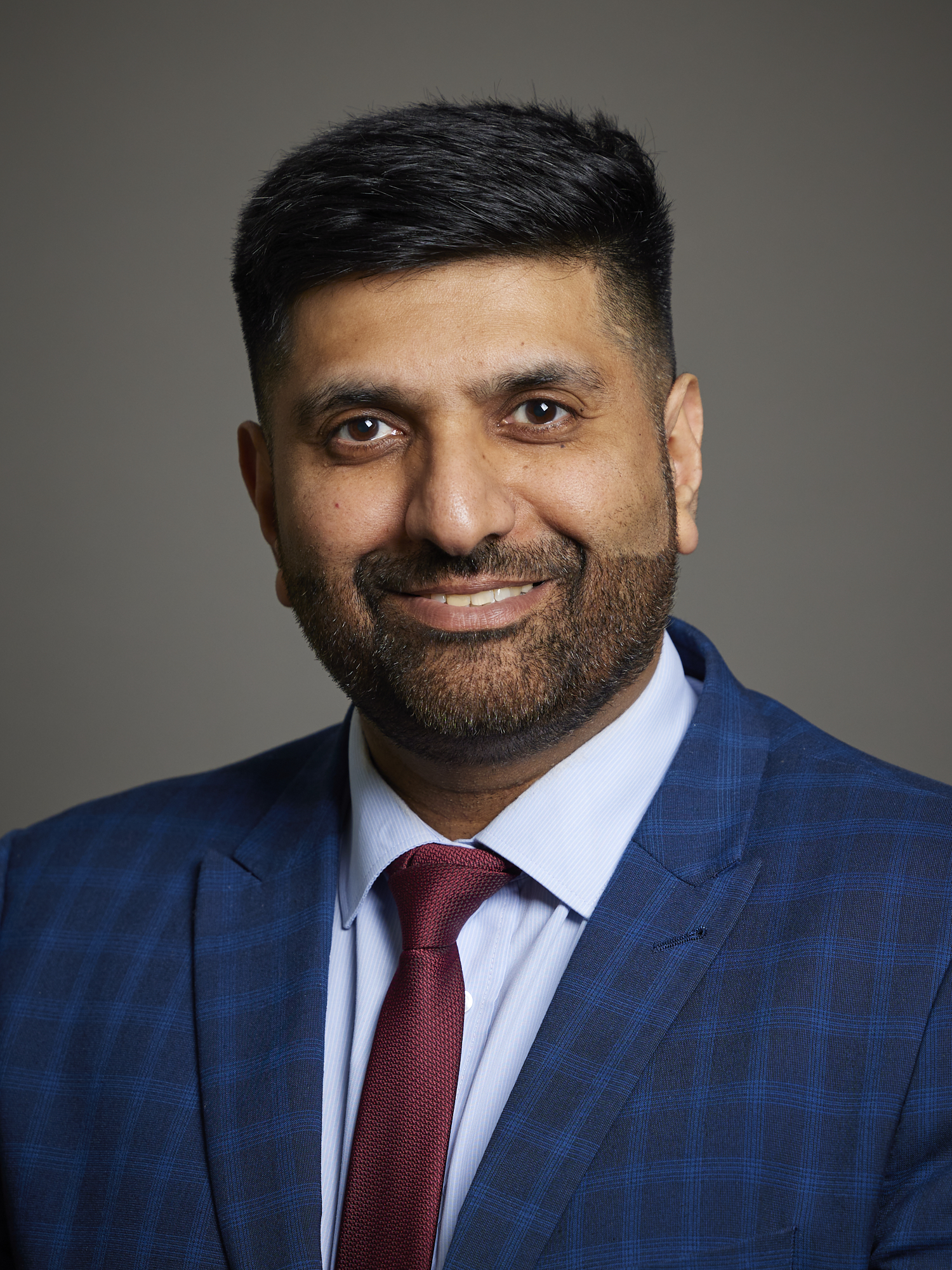
- Official portrait, 2024

Parliamentary Under-Secretary of State for Faith, Communities and Resettlement
- In office 9 July 2024 – 7 September 2025
- Prime Minister: Keir Starmer
- Preceded by: The Baroness Scott of Bybrook
- Succeeded by: Miatta Fahnbulleh (Faith and Communities)

Member of the House of Lords
- Lord Temporal
- Life peerage 4 February 2021

Member of the European Parliament for North West England
- In office 29 June 2017 – 1 July 2019
- Preceded by: Afzal Khan
- Succeeded by: Gina Dowding

Mayor of Burnley
- In office May 2020 – May 2021
- Preceded by: Cllr Anne Kelly
- Succeeded by: Cllr Cosima Towneley

Personal details
- Born: Wajid Iltaf Khan; 15 October 1979 (age 47) Burnley, Lancashire, England
- Party: Labour
- Spouse: Anam Khan
- Children: 2
- Education: University of Lancashire (LLB, LLM)
- Website: wajidkhan.org

Wajid Iltaf Khan, Baron Khan of Burnley (born 15 October 1979), is a British Labour Party politician and life peer who served as a Member of the European Parliament (MEP) for North West England from 2017 to 2019. He served as Parliamentary Under-Secretary of State for Faith, Communities and Resettlement from July 2024 to September 2025.

He sat on the Foreign Affairs Committee and Human Rights Committee, as well as the Arab Peninsula and South Asia delegations. His main policy interests include workers’ rights, youth empowerment and human rights.

In December 2020, it was announced he would be conferred a life peerage after a nomination by Labour Party Leader Keir Starmer.

== Early life ==
The son of a taxi driver and a house-wife, Wajid was born in Burnley, Lancashire, where he continues to live with his wife and two children. He read for a Bachelor of Laws degree and a Master of Laws (European Law) degree at the University of Central Lancashire, working as a taxi driver to fund his studies.

== Career ==
Before becoming an MEP, Wajid was a senior lecturer at the University of Central Lancashire for 12 years, and a course leader in community leadership for 11 years.

Prior to this, Wajid worked in the voluntary sector with young offenders, as well as teaching education programmes for homeless young people. The Burnley race riots in 2001 inspired Wajid to develop a number of community cohesion projects, which gained him the Higher Education Active Community Fund (HEACF) Volunteering Award for social and community cohesion in 2004.

Wajid's work in community development has seen him address the Civil G8 on inclusive education in Moscow, and advised the Russian Ministry of Education and Science on developing youth strategies.

He has contributed to European-wide ‘Volunteurope’ conferences in Germany, France, Poland, Bosnia and Italy.

Within the UK, Wajid has developed higher education programmes to increase academic participation amongst women in the south Asian community. Wajid has directed international leadership conferences in Oman, Turkey, Pakistan and the US, and has represented the University of Central Lancashire in collaborative projects with Russian NGOs.

Wajid is an alumnus of both of Prince Charles' leadership initiatives: the Mosaic international Leadership Programme, as well as the Oxford Young Muslim Leadership Programme.

He also serves on the Labour Party National Policy Forum and International Policy Commission, in addition to serving on the North West regional board.

== Member of the European Parliament ==
Khan was included in Labour's eight-person shortlist for the 2014 European Parliament election. He took over the North West England seat in July 2017, replacing Afzal Khan who was elected as a Member of Parliament in the general election. As an MEP he was the Labour Spokesperson for Human Rights, and sat on the Foreign Affairs Committee and the Human Rights Committee. He lost his seat in the 2019 European Parliament election.

== House of Lords ==
Lord Khan joined the House of Lords in February 2021 and has held several Opposition Posts. Since May 2021 he has been an Opposition Whip in the House of Lords, and in December 2021 he was appointed Shadow Spokesperson for Levelling Up, Housing, Communities and Local Government. Following the formation of the Starmer Government in July 2024 he was appointed Parliamentary Under-Secretary of State for Faith, Communities and Resettlement.

Orders of precedence in the United Kingdom
Preceded by The Lord Coaker	Gentlemen; Baron Khan of Burnley	Followed by The Lord Morse
