= John Whitelegg =

Lancaster City Councillor for Bulk Ward
- In office 3 May 2003 – 5 May 2011
- Succeeded by: Tim Hamilton-Cox

Personal details
- Party: Green Party of England and Wales
- Profession: Professor
- Website: John Whitelegg on Twitter (@John_Whitelegg)

John Whitelegg is visiting professor of sustainable transport at Liverpool John Moores University and professor of sustainable development at University of York's Stockholm Environment Institute.

== Academic career ==
From 1990 to 1993 Whitelegg was head of department of geography at Lancaster University and director of the university's Environmental Epidemiology Research Unit. He has written books and over 50 papers, including Transport for a Sustainable Society: the Case for Europe (John Wiley, 1993) and Critical Mass: Transport, Environment and Society in the 21st Century (Pluto Press, 1997), and is founder and editor of the Journal of World Transport Policy and Practice.

Managing director of Eco-Logica Limited and Fellow of the Royal Society for the Encouragement of Arts, Manufactures and Commerce. Research interests encompass transport and the environment, definition of sustainable transport systems and a sustainable built environment, development of transport in third world cities focusing on Calcutta and the relationships between sustainability and human health, implementation of environmental strategies within manufacturing and service industry and development of environmental management standards. Discipline: Transport, Planning & Housing.

== Politics ==
Whitelegg wrote a report on carbon emissions of the two parliament system in Europe for the then MEP Caroline Lucas of the Green Party.

From 2003 to May 2011 he was a Green Party local councillor in Lancaster. He stood down in Bulk Ward, and his successor held the ward for the Green Party. He is a former chair of the North West (of England) Green Party. He has been the Green Party's Sustainable Development Spokesperson.

== Books ==
- Hillman, M., Adams, J. and Whitelegg, J. (1990) One False Move: A Study of Children's Independent Mobility. Policy Studies Institute, London. ISBN 9780853744948
- Whitelegg, J. (editor) (1992) Traffic Congestion: Is There a Way Out?. Leading Edge Press, Hawes, Yorkshire. ISBN 9780948135354
- Whitelegg, J. Hulten, S. and Flink, T. (eds) (1993) High Speed Trains: fast tracks to the future. Leading Edge Press, Hawes, Yorkshire. ISBN 9780948135453
- Whitelegg, J. (1993) Transport for a Sustainable Future: the case for Europe. Belhaven, London. ISBN 9780471947912
- Whitelegg, J. (1997) Critical Mass: Transport Environment and Society in the Twenty-first Century. Pluto Press, London. ISBN 9780745310824
- Nick Williams, Maf Smith and John Whitelegg (1998) Greening the Built Environment. Earthscan, London.
- Whitelegg, J. and Gary Haq. (eds) (2003) The Earthscan Reader in World Transport Policy and Practice. Earthscan, London.
- Whitelegg, John (2 August 2012). Quality of Life and Public Management: Redefining Development in the Local Environment. Milton Park, Abingdon, Oxon: Routledge. ISBN 9780415509558.
- Whitelegg, John (2015). Mobility: A New Urban Design and Transport Planning Philosophy for a Sustainable Future. Church Stretton: Straw Barnes Press. ISBN 9781530227877.
