= Sajjad Karim =

British politician

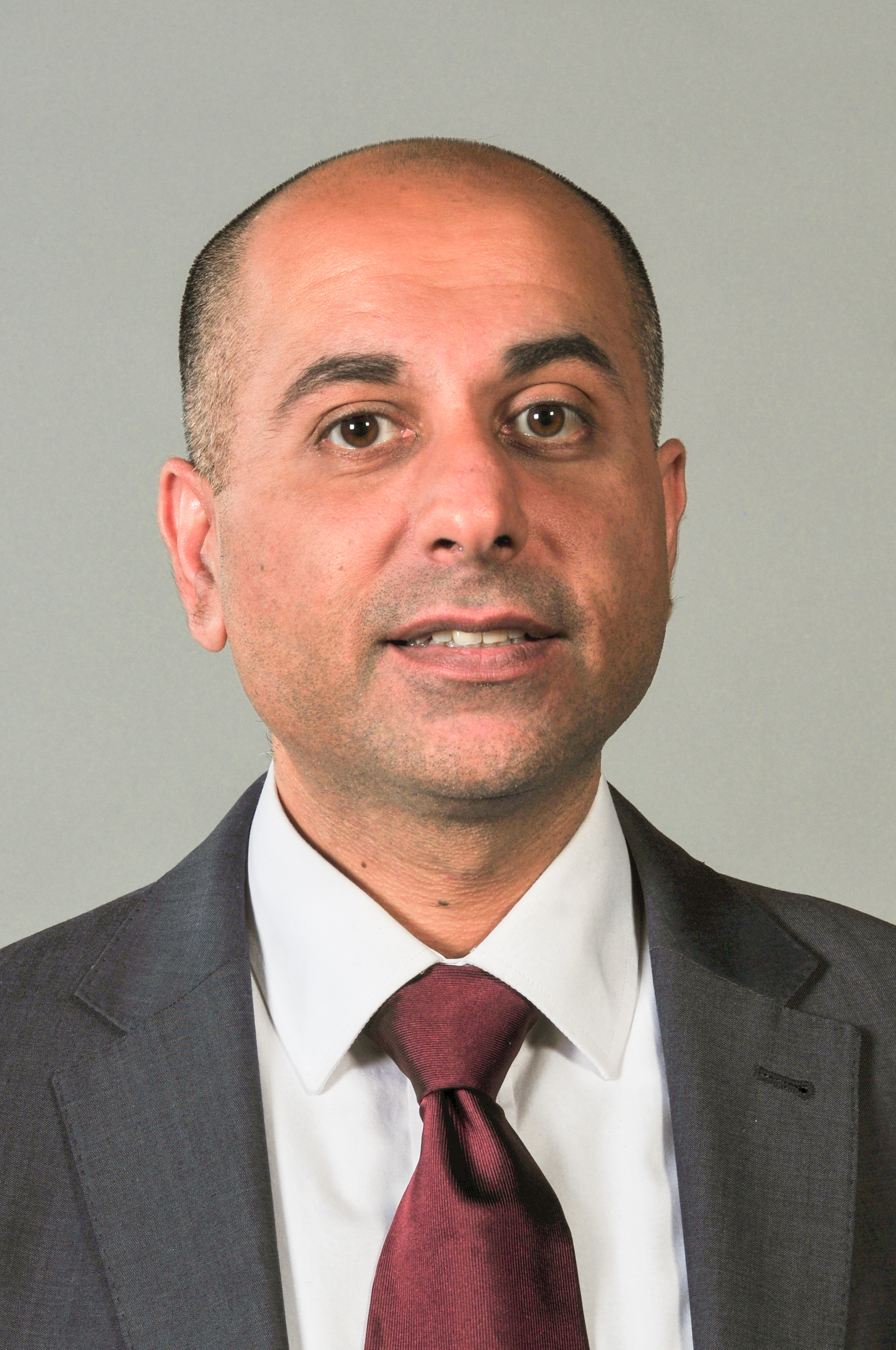

Member of the European Parliament for North West England
- In office 10 June 2004 – 1 July 2019
- Preceded by: Jacqueline Foster
- Succeeded by: Jane Brophy

Personal details
- Born: Sajjad Haider Karim; 11 July 1970 (age 56) Blackburn, Lancashire, England
- Party: Liberal Democrats (1989–2007); Conservative Party (2007-2019)
- Children: 2
- Education: London Guildhall University; College of Law Chester

Sajjad Haider Karim (born 11 July 1970) is a British politician. He served as a Member of the European Parliament for the North West England between 2004 and 2019. Karim was one of 10 members of the executive of European Movement UK and Chair of Conservative European Forum Trade.

He is a solicitor by profession and was the Legal Affairs Spokesman for the Conservatives in the European Parliament 2009 - 2019.

As well as having been a Spokesman to the WTO, he chaired the European Parliament's South Asia Trade Monitoring Committee; South Caucasus Delegation and was rotating chair of the Advisory Committee on the Conduct of Members. He also served as the vice-president of the European Parliament's Anti-Racism & Diversity Intergroup (ARDI) and as chair of its Working Group on Islamophobia.

In 2014 Karim was the European Conservatives and Reformists candidate for President of the European Parliament. He developed experience in Trade related issues including being the Parliamentary Rapporteur for an EU-India Free Trade Agreement (FTA). In 2015, he was given the highest National Honour bestowed upon foreigners by Pakistan for his role in securing a British Government lead initiative delivering favourable market access for Pakistan to the EU, known as the Generalised Scheme of Preferences (GSP+). Through Parliament, Karim delivered reforms which deliver exemptions for SMEs from regulation and new powers for national parliaments in EU decision-making. In 2019 he was named as Dodds Parliament Magazine winner of the International Trade Award.

On 19 August 2020, Karim tweeted his concerns at the then Government's lack of commitment to human rights, which was misreported by some in the media.

== Early life ==
Sajjad, a British Pakistani, was born in Blackburn, Lancashire, on 11 July 1970. His family hails from Mandi Bahauddin, Punjab, Pakistan.

Karim attended Walter Street County Primary School Brierfield and thereafter Mansfield High School, Brierfield. He completed his A levels at Nelson and Colne College before studying law at university. He attended the College of Law in Chester, studying law. He qualified as a solicitor of the Supreme Court of England and Wales in 1997, becoming an equity partner specialising in cases of serious fraud defence work.

His earliest political activity started with leafleting at the age of seven for the then Conservative parliamentary candidate for Pendle. He later joined the Liberal Democrats in 1989. Karim was elected a member of Pendle Borough Council in 1994 and served until 2002 representing Brierfield ward.

== Member of the European Parliament, 2004–2019 ==
Karim was elected to represent North West England in 2004 as a Liberal Democrat. On 26 November 2007 he joined the Conservative Party and was re-elected to the European Parliament in June 2009. In May 2014 he was re-elected to serve a third term. Despite being top of the Conservative party list he was not re-elected in 2019.

He is interested in human rights issues, including child labour and the civil liberties of EU citizens in the War on Terror. He led the successful European Union contribution to the campaign for the commutation of the death penalty of British man, Mirza Tahir Hussain, who had spent half of his life on death row in Pakistan, for a crime he maintains he did not commit.

Karim has spoken out on a number of key human rights issues and in particular, campaigns for self-determination for Kashmir. He hosted a number of conferences in the European Parliament on the issue. In 2013 he brought together Syrian opposition groups to try encourage a co-hesive strategy to the current regime. He has also been active on the issue of democracy in Egypt and civil rights in Turkey.

On 26 November 2008, whilst visiting India as part of a European Parliament Committee on International Trade delegation (ahead of an EU-India summit), he was caught in the 2008 Mumbai attacks in the lobby of the Taj Mahal Palace & Tower hotel. Speaking to the Associated Press while holed up in the hotel's restaurant shortly after the terrorists gained control of the hotel, Sajjad said "I was in the main lobby and there was all of a sudden a lot of firing outside...all of a sudden another gunmen appeared in front of us, carrying machine gun-type weapons. And he just started firing at us... I just turned and ran in the opposite direction."

In December 2009, he was appointed as the Legal Affairs Spokesperson for the Conservative Group in the European Parliament. He was reappointed to this front bench position in June 2014 following the European Elections in May. As well as serving as a full member of the Legal Affairs Committee (JURI), Karim was previously a substitute member of the Industry, Research and Energy Committee and the Civil Liberties and the Justice and Home Affairs Committee. He also previously served as a member of the Delegation for relations with the Mashreq countries and on the Delegation to the Parliamentary Assembly of the Union for the Mediterranean.

As Legal Affairs Spokesperson, he worked towards completing the Digital Single Market and Copyright Reform, which aims to enhance the competitiveness of European businesses and facilitate international trade.

Karim has championed the role played by the EU in developing and facilitating international trade between the EU and the wider world, and has been involved in the development of the EU-India Free Trade Agreement within the European Parliament. He was the European Parliament's rapporteur on the free trade agreement with India and has authored two trade-related European Parliament Reports on EU-India Trade Relations and the EU-India FTA.

Both reports maintain the need for human rights to be integral in any trade related agreement that the EU has with another country.

Karim spent considerable time working towards a reduction in EU regulations and red tape on businesses, particularly SMEs. In October 2011 he was appointed as the European Parliament rapporteur on a new report that will look at improving the law-making process across the EU and reducing the legislative burden.

In July 2011, the English Defence League staged an anti-Islamic protest outside his family home near Burnley, allegedly regarding new EU proposals on the labelling of halal meat. The group have targeted him despite not having much to do with either Saudi Arabia or British Bangladeshis.

In February 2012, Karim was one of five MEPs to be appointed to a panel to police the new code of conduct rules that will govern the behaviour of MEPs. He was the only British MEP to serve on this committee. The Advisory Committee provides guidance to MEPs and advises the Parliament's president on what steps to take in the event of alleged breaches of the code. In February 2014 he was appointed chairman of the Advisory Committee by the President of the European Parliament, Martin Schulz.

After the European elections in 2014, he was selected as the European Conservative and Reformist Group Parliament Presidential candidate. The incumbent Martin Schultz retained his position as president, with Karim coming second out of four candidates, widely acknowledged that he secured support from MEPs right across the house beyond his own group.

Karim made headline news in December 2012 when he played an instrumental role in securing the return of six-year-old Atiya Anjum-Wilkinson to UK from Pakistan following abduction by her father. Over several weeks he worked closely with Greater Manchester Police and the Pakistani authorities and Atiya was returned safely to her mother during the Christmas holidays.

In December 2013, the European Parliament voted to approve a concessionary trade status for Pakistan, GSP+. The preferential trade package for Pakistan's exports to EU countries came into force in January 2014. He steered the International Trade Committee to approve the beneficial trade tariff.

From 2014 to 2019, Karim steered the European Parliament's relations with the South Caucasus as chair of the region's delegation, successfully contributing to the establishment of the Comprehensive and Enhanced Partnership Agreement with Armenia and its GSP+ trading regime. He has helped finalise the negotiations on a new comprehensive agreement with Azerbaijan and has been monitoring & guiding the implementation of the Association Agreement with Georgia, which includes a Deep & Comprehensive Free Trade Agreement component.

Karim has been appointed as the vice-chair of ARDI and as chair of its Working group on Islamophobia. He held multiple events within the European Parliament aimed at raising awareness of the issue of Islamophobia. In 2018, the European Parliament - as part of its 2019 election campaign - displayed a poster on the Simone Veil Agora, featuring a photo of an ordinary Muslim family, captioned with ‘We need to work together to challenge migration’. Sajjad who considered the poster islamophobic was the only MEP who personally wrote to President Tajani challenging the poster, raising the issue in Plenary and eventually compelling the President to take down the poster.

== Recognition ==
Karim was awarded an Honorary Doctorate for the University of Management and Technology in Lahore for his work in securing the GSP+ deal and for services to the British Pakistani community.

In August 2014 he was awarded the Sitara-i-qaid-i-Azam, Pakistan's highest national honour to non-Pakistanis, for his services to strengthen Pakistan/UK and Pakistan/EU relations. Sajjad was presented with the award in March 2015 by Pakistan President, Mamnoon Hussain, at a ceremony in Islamabad.

In January 2015, he was nominated for the Politician of the Year award at the British Muslim Awards.

In March 2019, Karim was the recipient of the International Trade Award at The Parliament Magazine's annual MEP Awards.

In November 2019 Azerbaijan recognised Karims role in furthering EU-Azerbaijan relations by awarding him the Medal of Independence on the occasion of Azerbaijan's 100 years of independence.

== See also ==
- List of British Pakistanis
