= Gary Haq =

Gary Haq is a human ecologist, author and Research Associate at the Stockholm Environment Institute at the University of York. He is an expert in transport and environment, climate change, carbon footprint, behavioural change, carbon and urban air pollution management.

== Biography ==
Gary Haq has authored several reports and academic papers on transport, air pollution, climate change, behaviour and lifestyle. He has written for The Guardian, Yorkshire Post, The Independent and The Conversation on a range of environmental issues.

During 2006–2008 he coordinated a climate change communication campaign in Yorkshire Climate Talk in collaboration with BBC Radio and York Press. Greening the Greys: Climate Change and the Over 50s,The Carbon Cost of Christmas and Growing Old in a Changing Climate: Meeting the Challenges of Climate Change and an Ageing Population.

Haq undertakes research and provides policy advice on air quality management in developing countries. He undertook the first comprehensive assessment of air quality management in 20 Asian Cities and developed a Strategic Framework for Air Quality Management in Asian Cities and held the first UK Works of the Older People and Climate Change.

He is author of five non-fiction books: Towards Sustainable Transport Planning, World Transport Policy and Practice, Urban Air Pollution in Asian Cities, Environmentalism Since 1945, Short Guide to Environmental Policy.

In 2018, he published his first children's fiction book (8–12 years old) entitled My Dad, the Earth Warrior. The book is a funny, heartfelt, eco-adventure that addresses issues such as climate change, fracking and loss of community green space.

In 2019, My Dad, the Earth Warrior was shortlisted for The Times/Chicken House Children Competition run by publisher Barry Cunningham, known for his signing of J. K. Rowling in 1997. The book made it to the final six out of 1,600 applications but was beaten by Nigerian-German author, Efua Traoré, with Children of the Quicksands.

The My Dad, the Earth Warrior also won a gold medal in the Wishing Shelf Book Awards (2018) judged by UK school children, which described it as "A gripping adventure with a strong environmental message. A GOLD MEDAL WINNER and highly recommended."

It was nominated KS2 Book of the Month on School Zone a book review site for teachers and librarians. The Lancashire Post described the book as a " ... sparkling, green-coloured adventure – with a big heart and a big message – brimming with laughter, love and crazy mishaps."

Since the publication of his fiction book, Haq has called for greater coverage of environmental issues in children's books.

He is author of the environmental blog: A Human Ecologist's View.
