= Vincent Kaufmann =

Swiss sociologist and urbanist

Professor Vincent Kaufmann
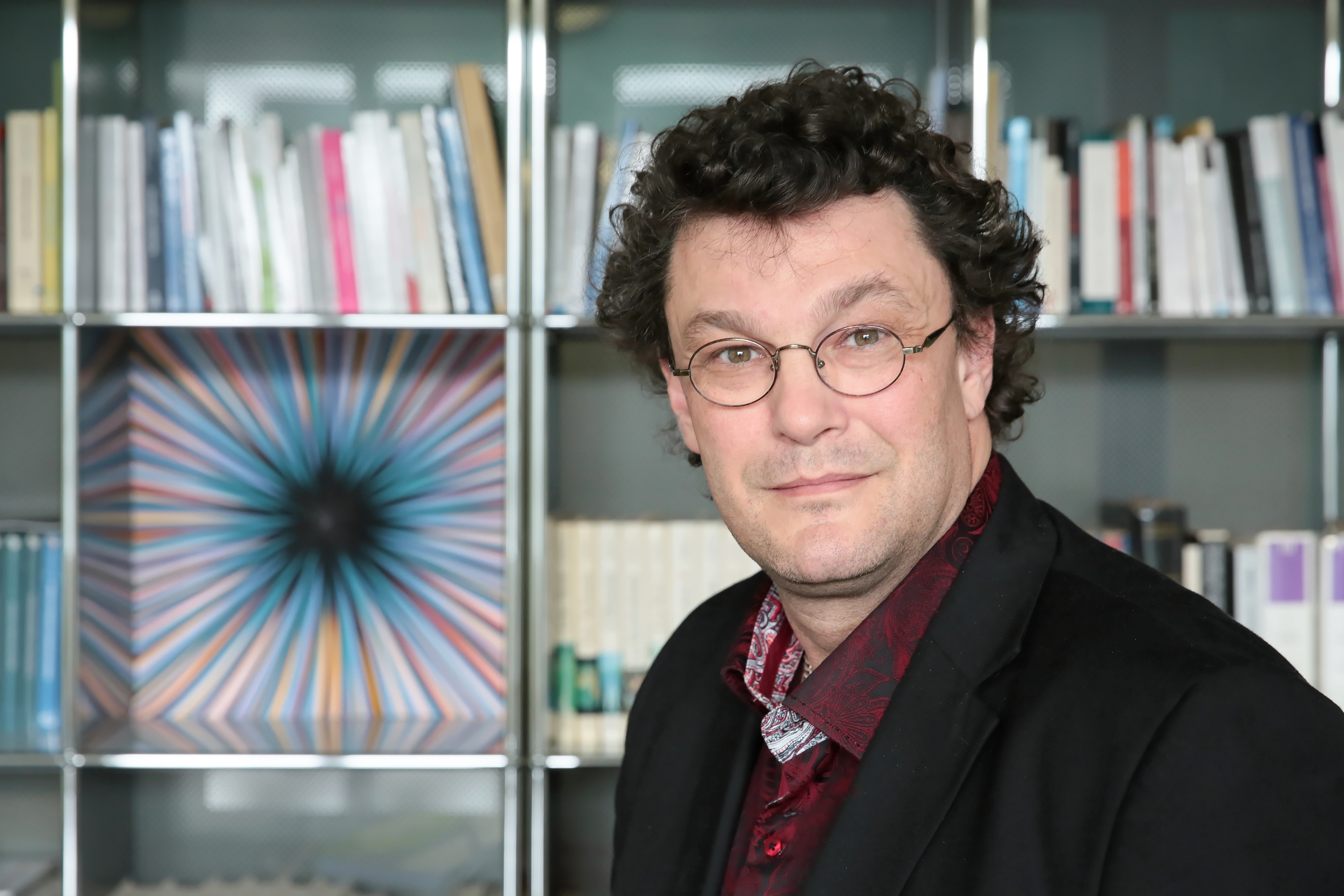
- Vincent Kaufmann in 2017
- Born: 1969 (age 56–57); Geneva
- Citizenship: Swiss
- Known for: La notion de motilité. L'analyse des modes de vie. L'ètude des mobilités

Academic background
- Education: Sociology
- Alma mater: University of Geneva; EPFL
- Thesis: Sociologie de la mobilité urbaine: la question du report modal (1998)
- Doctoral advisor: Michel Bassand

Academic work
- Discipline: Sociology
- Sub-discipline: Urban sociology
- Institutions: EPFL (École Polytechnique Fédérale de Lausanne)
- Main interests: Mobility; Urban sociology Land development
- Website: https://www.epfl.ch/labs/lasur/

Vincent Kaufmann (born 1969 in Geneva) is a Swiss sociologist specialized in mobility studies and urban sociology. He is a professor of sociology at EPFL (École Polytechnique Fédérale de Lausanne) and the head of the Laboratory of Urban Sociology at the School of Architecture, Civil and Environmental Engineering.

== Career ==
Kaufman studied sociology at the University of Geneva and received his Licence (Master's degree) in 1992. He joined Michel Bassand at EPFL as a doctoral student to work on urban sociology, in particular on rationalities underlying transport modal practices. He graduated with thesis on "Sociologie de la mobilité urbaine : la question du report modal" in 1998. He continued as a postdoctoral fellow at EPFL's Research Institute of the Built Environment (IREC). He then moved to Lancaster University as an invited lecturer in 2000. In 2001, he became an invited scholar at the Ecole Nationale des Ponts et Chaussées in the Laboratoire Techniques, Territoires et Société and continued to investigate perception and modal choice. In 2002, he was made associate professor at the Cergy-Pontoise University.

In 2003, he first became assistant professor at EPFL and was promoted to an associate professor position in 2010. Since 2003 he has been the head of the Laboratory of Urban Sociology at EPFL's School of Architecture, Civil and Environmental Engineering.

Since 2011 he is scientific director of the Forum Vies Mobiles in Paris. In 2020, he became associate dean for Education and Knowledge Transfer at EPFL's School of Architecture, Civil and Environmental Engineering. As invited lecturer he taught among others at Université du Québec (2008) Radboud University Nijmegen (2010), University of Toulouse-Jean Jaurès (2011), Polytechnic University of Milan (2016), Université catholique de Louvain (2004–2018), and Tongji University in Shanghai (2018).

== Research ==
Kaufmann's research focuses on motility, the relation of mobility and urban life styles, the links between social and spatial mobility, public policies of land planning and use, and transportation in general. In an interdisciplinary manner he draws both on engineering, architecture and sociology to study the social conditions that produce and shape cities or territories, mainly through the mobility capacities of its actors. His research topics are among others daily mobility, residential history, the dynamics of sub-urbanization and gentrification, public spaces, and network management.

== Selected works ==
=== Journal papers ===
- Kaufmann, Vincent; Bergman, Manfred Max; Joye, Dominique (2004). "Motility: Mobility as capital". International Journal of Urban and Regional Research. 28 (4): 745–756. doi:10.1111/j.0309-1317.2004.00549.x.
- Kaufmann, Vincent (2005). "Mobilités et réversibilités : Vers des sociétés plus fluides ?". Cahiers Internationaux de Sociologie. 118: 119. doi:10.3917/cis.118.0119.
- Flamm, Michael; Kaufmann, Vincent (2006). "Operationalising the Concept of Motility: A Qualitative Study". Mobilities. 1 (2): 167–189. doi:10.1080/17450100600726563. S2CID 143987388.
- Pflieger, Geraldine; Kaufmann, Vincent; Pattaroni, Luca; Jemelin, Christophe (2009). "How Does Urban Public Transport Change Cities? Correlations between Past and Present Transport and Urban Planning Policies". Urban Studies. 46 (7): 1421–1437. doi:10.1177/0042098009104572. S2CID 152677002.
- Kaufmann, Vincent (2010). "Mobile social science: Creating a dialogue among the sociologies". The British Journal of Sociology. 61: 367–372. doi:10.1111/j.1468-4446.2009.01294.x. PMID 20092504. S2CID 9131697.
- Pattaroni, Luca; Kaufmann, Vincent; Thomas, Marie-Paule (2012). "The Dynamics of Multifaceted Gentrification: A Comparative Analysis of the Trajectories of Six Neighbourhoods in the Île-de-France Region". International Journal of Urban and Regional Research. 36 (6): 1223–1241. doi:10.1111/j.1468-2427.2011.01042.x.
- Audikana, Ander; Kaufmann, Vincent; Messer, Marc Antoine (2015). "Governing the Geneva Tram Network: Making Decisions without Making Choices". Journal of Urban Technology. 22 (4): 103–124. doi:10.1080/10630732.2015.1073897. S2CID 113072686.
- Kaufmann, Vincent; Dubois, Yann; Ravalet, Emmanuel (2018). "Measuring and typifying mobility using motility". Applied Mobilities. 3 (2): 198–213. doi:10.1080/23800127.2017.1364540. S2CID 134334184.

=== Books ===
- Kaufmann, Vincent (2000). Mobilité quotidienne et dynamiques urbaines: La question du report modal. ISBN 2-88074-432-6.
- Kaufmann, Vincent (2 March 2017). Re-Thinking Mobility: Contemporary Sociology. Routledge. ISBN 9781351903646.
- Kaufmann, Vincent; Ander, Audikana (2017). Mobilité et libre circulation en Europe - un regard suisse (DROIT). Economica. ISBN 978-2717869200.
- Kaufmann, Vincent (2011). Rethinking the City: Urban Dynamics and Motility. EPFL Press. ISBN 9782940222476.
- Viry, Gil; Kaufmann, Vincent (11 August 2015). High Mobility in Europe: Work and Personal Life. Springer. ISBN 9781137447388.
- Kaufmann, Vincent (2011). 9782880747695. Economica. ISBN 978-2717869200.
- Kaufmann, Vincent; Ravalet, Emmanuel (2019). L'Urbanisme par les modes de vie: Outils d'analyse pour un aménagement durable. Métis Presses. ISBN 978-2-94-0563-50-0.
