= Theresa Griffin =

British politician (born 1962)

The Right Honourable The Baroness Griffin of Princethorpe
- Official portrait, 2025

Chair of the European Parliamentary Labour Party
- In office 14 September 2016 – 31 January 2020
- Preceded by: Richard Howitt
- Succeeded by: Position abolished

Member of the European Parliament for North West England
- In office 1 July 2014 – 31 January 2020
- Preceded by: Arlene McCarthy
- Succeeded by: Constituency abolished

Member of the House of Lords
- Lord Temporal
- Life peerage 16 January 2025

Personal details
- Born: 11 December 1962 (age 63) Coventry, England
- Party: Labour
- Other political affiliations: Progressive Alliance of Socialists and Democrats
- Education: Lancaster University
- Website: www.theresagriffin.co.uk

Theresa Mary Griffin, Baroness Griffin of Princethorpe (born 11 December 1962), is a British politician who served as a Labour Party Member of the European Parliament (MEP) for North West England from 2014 to 2020. In the European Parliament, Griffin was aligned with the Progressive Alliance of Socialists and Democrats (S&D).

== Early life ==
Theresa Griffin was born in Coventry, Warwickshire, as the fourth child of Irish immigrant parents. Her father was a machinist in the British Leyland car factory and her mother was a teaching assistant. Griffin attended Bishop Ullathorne Comprehensive school and achieved a first class B.A. and an M.A. from Lancaster University.

== Political career ==
Griffin has been a member of the Labour Party since 1988. She was a member of Unite's North West Political Committee and represented North West Constituency Labour Partys on the National Policy Forum. Griffin has also served as a Regional Organiser for the public services union, UNISON. She was Director of Communications and Research at North West Arts. She was a local government councillor on Liverpool City Council in the 1990s. As a Liverpool City Councillor, she was the lead member for Economic Development and Europe.

=== European Parliament ===
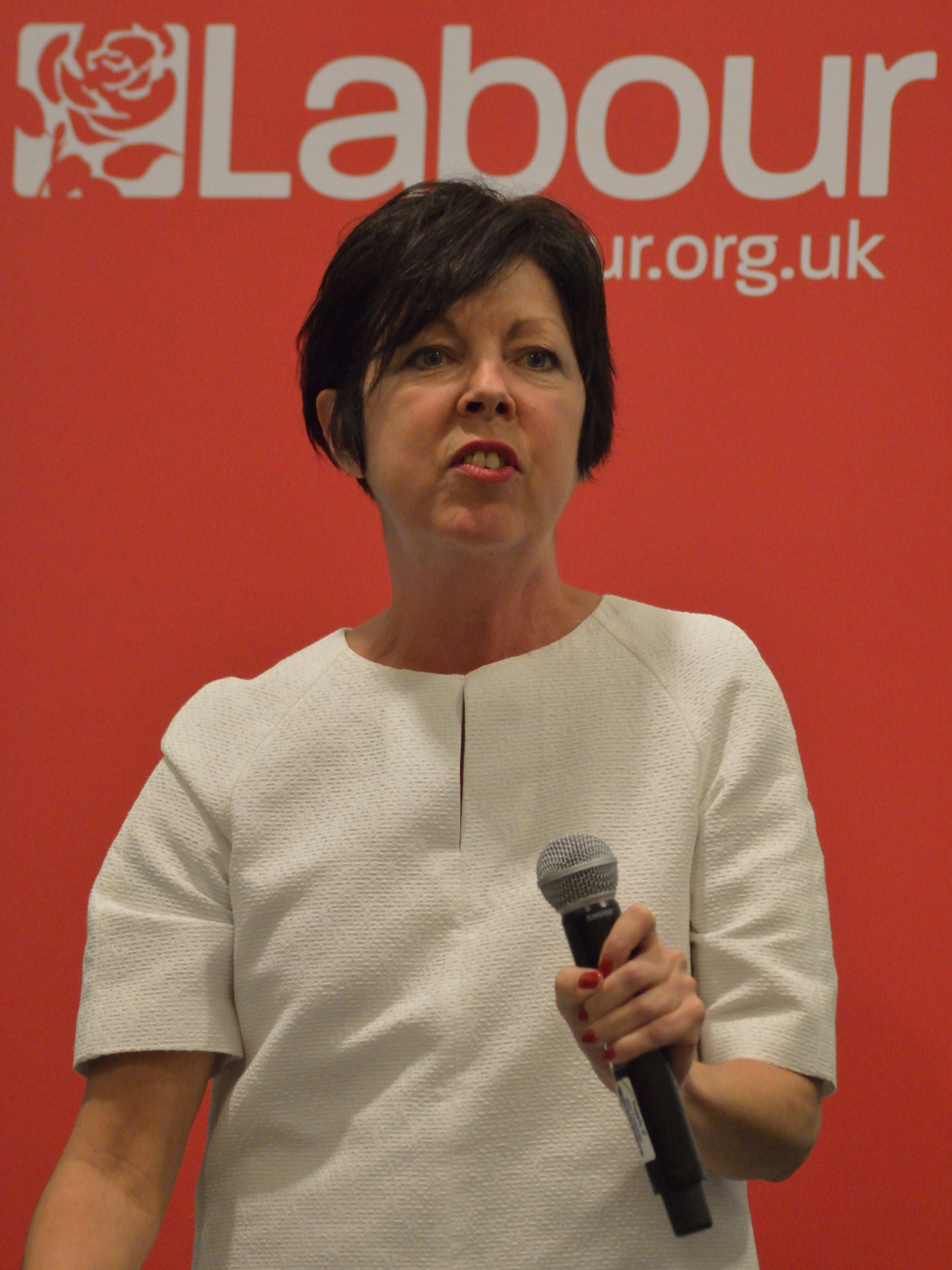
Griffin speaking at a 2016 Labour Party Conference fringe meeting

Theresa Griffin previously stood in the 1999 European Parliament election, 2004 European Parliament election and 2009 European Parliament election as a Labour candidate for the North West England region. In 2009 she lost out to the British National Party's Nick Griffin (no relation).

She stood in the 2014 European Parliament election, again as a Labour Party candidate for the North West England region, and was elected as the first candidate on the winning Labour Party list.

She supported Owen Smith in the 2016 Labour Party (UK) leadership election.

Theresa Griffin is the winner of the Energy Award, MEP Awards 2017.

She was re-elected at the 2019 European Parliament election, serving until Britain formally exited the EU on 31 January 2020.

==== Work in the European Parliament ====
Griffin supported the Cammell Laird strikers petition to the European Parliament in 2014, believing the strikers to be the victims of a miscarriage of justice. She supported the "Fair Pay Fortnight" in 2015, which campaigned for higher wages for workers.

In 2014 Griffin called on the UK Government to correctly allocate EU funding to the North West region.

She supported Carbon Capture and Storage (CCS) technology as part of climate change mitigation.

Griffin advocated a Market Stability Reserve (MSR) for the EU Emissions Trading System (EU ETS). In January 2015 she led a progressive coalition to vote in rejecting proposals that she said would weaken the ETS. Griffin said that the final report would have been "highly regressive and would have had an extremely negative impact on the ETS without benefiting industry in the long run."

Griffin has written several articles on energy policy, calling for EU-wide coordination of national energy policies. In March 2015, she contributed to the tenth report of the UK Parliament's Energy and Climate Change Committee, outlining future UK energy and climate change policy requirements, with particular focus on fuel poverty.

In 2015 Griffin called for more EU funding to global health research to aid the eradication of tuberculosis, HIV/AIDS and malaria.

Griffin was a full member and Labour Party Spokesperson for the Industry, Research and Energy (ITRE) Committee, a substitute member on the Transport and Tourism (TRAN) Committee and was assigned to the Delegation to the EU-Russia Parliamentary Cooperation Committee and the Delegation for Relations with the People's Republic of China. In October 2014, she was appointed the S&D Shadow Rapporteur for an Opinion on the ITRE Committee about greenhouse gas emission trading. She was also a member of the EU Intergroups (cross-party working groups) on Disability Rights, the Digital Agenda for Europe, Children's Rights and Well-being, LGBTI, SMEs, Tourism, Trade Union and Urban.

=== House of Lords ===
Griffin was nominated for a life peerage by Prime Minister Keir Starmer in late 2024. She was created Baroness Griffin of Princethorpe, of Princethorpe in the County of Warwickshire, on 16 January 2025, and was introduced to the House of Lords on 20 January.
