= Jacqueline Foster =

British politician

The Right Honourable The Baroness Foster of Oxton DBE
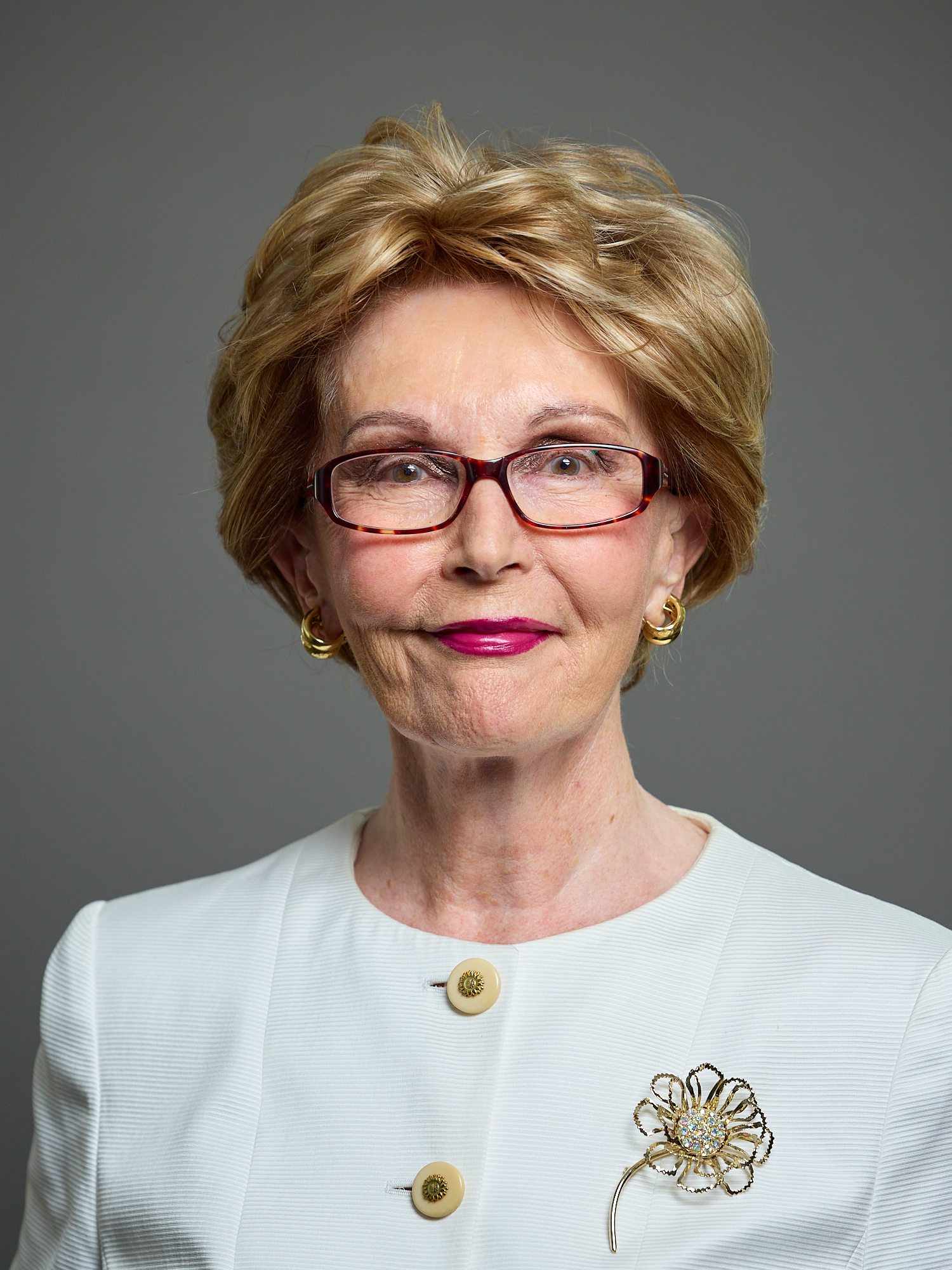
- Official portrait, 2025

Member of the House of Lords
- Lord Temporal
- Life peerage 29 January 2021

Deputy Leader of the Conservative MEPs in the European Parliament
- In office 20 November 2013 – 1 July 2019

Member of the European Parliament for North West England
- In office 4 June 2009 – 1 July 2019
- Preceded by: David Sumberg
- Succeeded by: Chris Davies
- In office 10 June 1999 – 10 June 2004
- Preceded by: Position established
- Succeeded by: Sajjad Karim

Personal details
- Born: Jacqueline Renshaw; 30 December 1947 (age 78) Liverpool, England
- Party: Conservative

Jacqueline Foster, Baroness Foster of Oxton, DBE (née Renshaw, born 30 December 1947) is a British Conservative politician and a former Member of the European Parliament for the North West England region.

In October 2019 she was appointed Dame Commander of the Most Excellent Order of the British Empire. In January 2021, she was appointed as a life peer in the House of Lords as Baroness Foster of Oxton, of Oxton in the County of Merseyside.

== Early life and career ==
Jacqueline Foster was born in Liverpool, Lancashire, on 30 December 1947 to Samuel and Isabella Renshaw. Foster was educated at Prescot Grammar School for Girls.

She worked for British Airways for more than 20 years. Before joining BA she worked in France and Spain in the tourism sector. Foster speaks French and German.

Between 1981 and 1985, she left British Airways and became area manager in Austria for Horizon, a British tour operator, before returning to British Airways. In 1989, she was one of the founder members of Cabin Crew '89, an independent trade union, and served as the Deputy General Secretary. She continued with British Airways until she was elected as a MEP for North West England in 1999.

== Political involvement ==
Foster combined her trade union activities with membership of the Conservative Party, serving as Vice Chairman of Twickenham Conservative Association, as well as holding a variety of voluntary political offices for the Greater London area.

At the 1992 general election, she was the unsuccessful Conservative candidate in Newham South, a Labour-held seat in east London, achieving a small swing to the Conservatives. In August 1995, she was selected for the marginal seat of Peterborough (where sitting Conservative MP Brian Mawhinney was moving to an adjacent constituency), and finished second behind Labour in the general election of 1997.

== Member of the European Parliament ==
For the 1999 European Parliament election, Foster was selected as a Conservative candidate for the North West as fifth on their list and won. During this first mandate (1999-2004), she was elected annually as the chairman of the Backbench Committee of MEPs. Her political responsibilities were as the Conservative Spokesman on Transport responsible for the portfolios on Aviation Maritime Road and Rail and was also the Spokesman on Tourism (she specialised in the Aviation Industry) Following the 9/11 attacks, she was the Rapporteur on the regulation which introduced minimum standards of security in airports across Europe. She was also a member of the Trade and Industry Committee. A Member of the Africa Caribbean Pacific Joint Parliamentary Assembly (ACP), and was the European Parliament Spokesman on Zimbabwe.

She was a member of the Sky & Space Parliamentary Intergroup, and a member of the Animal Welfare Parliamentary Intergroup.

At the 2004 European Parliament election, Foster lost her seat.

In 2009, she was placed third on the Conservative list for the North West in the European Parliament election and was again elected as an MEP. She was again appointed as the Transport Spokesman, and also served as a Vice President of the Sky & Space and Animal Welfare Parliamentary Intergroups and as a member of the EU-US Delegation. In addition, Foster sat as a member of the Environment Committee. She was elected Deputy Leader of the Conservative delegation of MEPs in 2013, and was re-elected annually until 2019.

In 2013, Foster argued against the Conservative Party having an electoral pact with UK Independence Party.

Following the 2014 European election, she was re-appointed as the Conservative transport spokesman and also the spokesman on tourism. She was the Rapporteur/draftsman of the 'Report on the Safe Use of RPAS' (drones) in the civil sector. Foster remained on the Environment Committee. She was re-elected as a vice president of both the Sky & Space and Animal Welfare Parliamentary Intergroups. She remained a member of the EU/US Parliamentary Delegation, and was elected vice president of the Australia/New Zealand Delegation with the focus on securing future trade deals.

== Work outside of the European Parliament ==
Foster was not re-elected in the 2004 European election. She worked as a consultant for Airbus, before becoming the head of European Affairs for ASD (Aerospace Space & Defence Industries of Europe) based in Brussels, until returning as an MEP in 2009.

Since 2019, Foster has been a senior advisor for the Drone Delivery Group.

== House of Lords ==
Foster was appointed Dame Commander of the Most Excellent Order of the British Empire (DBE) in the 2019 Birthday Honours. She was appointed to the House of Lords on 29 January 2021 and introduced on 9 February 2021.

== Libel apology ==
In March 2024, Foster issued a public apology and paid damages to Melika Gorgianeh, a University Challenge contestant. Foster tweeted that the octopus soft toy which Gorgianeh's team used as a mascot, was chosen as an antisemitic symbol. Foster called for Gorgianeh to be expelled from university and arrested. In her public apology Foster stated "I accept that these allegations were completely false and unfounded.[...] I again deeply apologise to Ms Gorgianeh for these allegations and any distress caused to her.[...] I have agreed to pay her substantial damages and costs."

== Personal life ==
. She lists her recreations as skiing, travel and golf. Jacqueline Foster is a member of the Carlton Club.
