= Paul Nuttall =

British politician

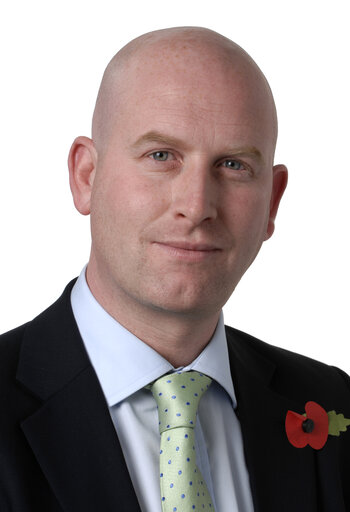
- Official portrait, 2009

Deputy Chairman of Reform UK
- Incumbent
- Assumed office 3 July 2025
- Leader: Nigel Farage
- Chairman: David Bull; Lee Anderson
- Preceded by: Office established
Previous party positions 2008–2017
Leader of the UK Independence Party
In office 28 November 2016 – 9 June 2017
Deputy	Peter Whittle
Preceded by	Diane James
Succeeded by	Henry Bolton
Leader of the UK Independence Party in the European Parliament
In office November 2015 – 3 January 2017
Preceded by	Roger Helmer
Succeeded by	Ray Finch
UKIP Spokesperson for Education, Life Skills and Training
In office 24 July 2014 – 17 September 2016
Leader	Nigel Farage
Preceded by	Position established
Succeeded by	David Kurten
Deputy Leader of the UK Independence Party
In office 8 November 2010 – 16 September 2016
Leader	Nigel Farage
Preceded by	David Campbell Bannerman & The Viscount Monckton of Brenchley
Succeeded by	Peter Whittle
Chair of the UK Independence Party
In office 8 September 2008 – 8 November 2010
Leader	Nigel Farage; The Lord Pearson of Rannoch; Jeffrey Titford (Acting)
Preceded by	John Whittaker
Succeeded by	Steve Crowther

Member of the European Parliament for North West England
- In office 14 July 2009 – 1 July 2019
- Preceded by: John Whittaker
- Succeeded by: Claire Fox

Personal details
- Born: Paul Andrew Nuttall; 30 November 1976 (age 49) Bootle, Merseyside, England
- Party: Reform UK (since 2019)
- Other political affiliations: Conservative (until 2004); UKIP (2004–2018); Independent (2018)
- Education: Edge Hill College (BA); Liverpool Hope University (MA); University of Central Lancashire (PGCE)

Paul Andrew Nuttall (born 30 November 1976) is a British politician who has been the Vice Chairman of Reform UK since July 2025. He served as Leader of the UK Independence Party (UKIP) from 2016 to 2017. He was elected to the European Parliament in 2009 as a UK Independence Party (UKIP) candidate, and served as a Member of the European Parliament (MEP) for North West England until 2019, sitting in the Europe of Freedom and Direct Democracy group. He left UKIP in December 2018, criticising the party's association with far-right activist Tommy Robinson, and joined the Brexit Party, later Reform UK, in 2019.

Nuttall was a Conservative Party candidate in a council election in Sefton before joining UKIP in 2004. He became deputy leader of UKIP, deputising for Nigel Farage, in November 2010 and the party's spokesperson for education, life skills and training in July 2014. He was elected party leader in the November 2016 leadership election. Nuttall stood unsuccessfully for UKIP six times in parliamentary elections between 2005 and 2017, of which his best result was finishing second in the 2017 Stoke-on-Trent Central by-election. He resigned as party leader after coming third in Boston and Skegness in the 2017 general election, with his party losing most of its electoral support.

A prominent Eurosceptic, Nuttall has also called for the establishment of an English parliament. He favours a ban on wearing burqas in public places, opposes abortion, has shown support for the reintroduction of the death penalty, and opposed Labour's 2015 plans to include LGBT-inclusive sex and relationship education in schools.

In August 2025, Nuttall was chosen by Nigel Farage to join Reform UK's decision-making board.

== Early life ==
Paul Andrew Nuttall was born in Bootle in Merseyside and educated at Savio High School, a Roman Catholic school. He was raised Catholic and currently practises that faith. He completed his A-Levels at Hugh Baird College in Bootle.

== Personal life ==
Nuttall was previously married and has a child from that marriage.

=== Involvement in football ===
As a footballer, he was a member of Tranmere Rovers' youth squad in the early 1990s, although he later backtracked on claims made in one of his own press releases and UKIP campaign material that he had played professionally for the team.

=== Historical studies ===
Nuttall studied history at Edge Hill College (now Edge Hill University), graduating with a BA, and at Liverpool Hope University where he specialised in Edwardian politics and graduated with an MA.

During his time at Edge Hill, Nuttall submitted an essay about the causes of the Holocaust, in which, according to his lecturer David Renton, he "suggested that there was an argument to be made that the Jewish people had brought it on themselves", citing the writer and Holocaust denier David Irving. When Renton discussed the quotations with him, Nuttall told Renton that "he was not responsible for the citations: his girlfriend had found them on the internet".

In 2004, Nuttall started working towards a PhD in the 'History of Conservatism in Liverpool', but did not complete it.

== Teaching career ==
Nuttall received a Certificate in Education from the University of Central Lancashire. He lectured at Liverpool Hope University between 2004 and 2006.

== Political career ==
=== Early political career (2002–2009) ===
Before joining UKIP, Nuttall was a member of the Conservative Party. In the 2002 local government elections, he stood as a Conservative candidate in Derby Ward on Sefton Metropolitan Borough Council, where he came second, winning 11.4% of the vote.

In 2004, Nuttall left the Conservatives and joined the UK Independence Party (UKIP). He founded its South Sefton branch in 2005 in order to contest elections in north Merseyside. He was UKIP's candidate for Bootle in the 2005 general election, where he won 4.1% of the vote. At the 2008 local elections, Nuttall again stood as a candidate for Derby Ward on Sefton Metropolitan Borough Council, but this time as a UKIP candidate. He won 38% of the vote, behind the Labour candidate.

In 2008, Nuttall also became the founding secretary of Young Independence, the youth wing of UKIP for under 35-year-olds. He held this position until UKIP's spring conference in 2009 when Young Independence held its first internal elections. Nuttall was appointed as chairman of UKIP in September 2008. At the time, he was also employed as a political adviser to the Independence/Democracy group in the European Parliament.

=== First term in the European Parliament (2009–2014) ===
In the 2009 European Parliament election, Nuttall was selected to head the UKIP list for the North West England constituency. Speaking to the Liverpool Echo, he said "The Euro-election next June will give people the chance to express their views about the European Union. It is really the referendum on the Lisbon Treaty that they have been denied. A vote for any other party is a vote for the EU. If people do not like having 80% of our legislation emanating from unelected bureaucrats in Brussels the only party to vote for is UKIP." He was subsequently elected.

Nuttall became a member of the Europe of Freedom and Democracy (EFD) group in the European Parliament, as well as a member of the Committee on the Environment, Public Health and Food Safety (ENVI) and a substitute member of the Committee on Culture and Education (CULT). His first speech in plenary was on 7 October 2009, on the "underhand and undemocratic way in which the incandescent light bulb has been banned across the European Union."

Nuttall opened an office for his European Parliament work in Bootle in March 2010. Nuttall again contested Bootle at the 2010 general election, coming fourth with 6.1% of the vote. In July 2010, it was found that, on average, British MEPs had the worst European Parliament attendance records, and that Nuttall, alongside David Campbell Bannerman and Godfrey Bloom, had the worst attendance records of British MEPs, with an average of below 63%. On 8 November 2010, Nuttall was confirmed by UKIP's NEC as Nigel Farage's choice for deputy leader. At the same time, he stepped down as chairman. He said, "This is a great honour which I was happy to accept, particularly at such a very exciting time for UKIP."

Following the general election, a High Court ruling found the result in Oldham East and Saddleworth null and void after Labour's Phil Woolas was found to have made false statements in campaign literature. Nuttall was selected as UKIP's candidate in the 2011 by-election held in the constituency to replace Woolas. Speaking to local media, he said that the by-election was "built on a pyramid of lies": "Whether it's Labour lying on their own election literature which has caused this sorry scenario, or whether it's the Liberal Democrats lying over tuition fees and reneging on their manifesto pledges, or whether it's the Tories lying over our relationship with the EU, or immigration, or crime." Nuttall came fourth in the election, winning 5.8% of the vote.

During the debate over a possible electoral pact between the Conservatives and UKIP, in September 2012 Nuttall said "You never say never in politics" when asked about the possibility of them working together. In November 2012, Nuttall said there would be "no deals with the Tories while David Cameron is leader", blaming Cameron's previous comments about the party, including that it was one of "closet racists".

In February 2013, Nuttall visited Bulgaria at the invitation of independent MEP Slavcho Binev. He visited the largest Romani quarter of Sofia, Bulgaria's capital, and later commented that such slums should not exist in Europe and that minorities should be integrated. He took part in a joint press conference with Binev, during which nationalist politician Volen Siderov interrupted proceedings to accuse UKIP of racism. This led to "an angry and rude exchange of words between him and Binev."

In April 2013, Nuttall predicted that the UK "will probably be out of the EU by 2020". His speech to UKIP's 2013 conference was praised by some, including Isabel Hardman of The Spectator, who wrote: "Nuttall's speech was more impressive and powerful that the slightly sweaty offering his boss gave a few minutes after him. The question is whether this northern MEP can become a brand in his own right in the way that Farage has managed to."

=== Second term in the European Parliament (2014–2019) ===
In 2014, Nuttall was returned to the European Parliament at the European election and was one of two UKIP MEPs representing the constituency of North West England. In 2015, he once again contested Bootle, and came second behind Labour, with a 10.9% vote share.

=== UKIP Leadership (2016–2017) ===
He announced in July 2016 that he would not stand in the September 2016 UKIP leadership election following the resignation of Nigel Farage and that he would step down as deputy leader of the party. In October 2016, Nuttall announced that he would run in the second UKIP leadership election of 2016, triggered when Diane James, leader for 18 days after the first 2016 leadership election, announced she was to stand down.

On 28 November 2016, following the second 2016 leadership election, he became leader of UKIP with 62.2% of the vote.

Nuttall stood as a UKIP candidate for the 2017 Stoke-on-Trent Central by-election. His campaign was compromised by his various questionable claims: that he "lost close personal friends" at the Hillsborough disaster, that he had a PhD, had been on the board of directors at a vocational training charity, and had been a footballer for Tranmere Rovers, all of which emerged to be untrue. He was investigated for possibly fraudulent claims that he was living in a house in Stoke-on-Trent, which was discovered to be empty and still advertised to rent, when he filed his nomination papers. Gareth Snell of Labour won the by-election with 7,853 votes to Nuttall's 5,233, Nuttall finishing second with 24.7% of the vote.

Nuttall stood in the 2017 general election, in the constituency of Boston and Skegness, but failed to win the seat. He resigned as leader the day after the election.

=== Reform UK (2025–present) ===
In July 2025, Nuttall was announced as the vice chairman of Reform UK.

== Political views ==
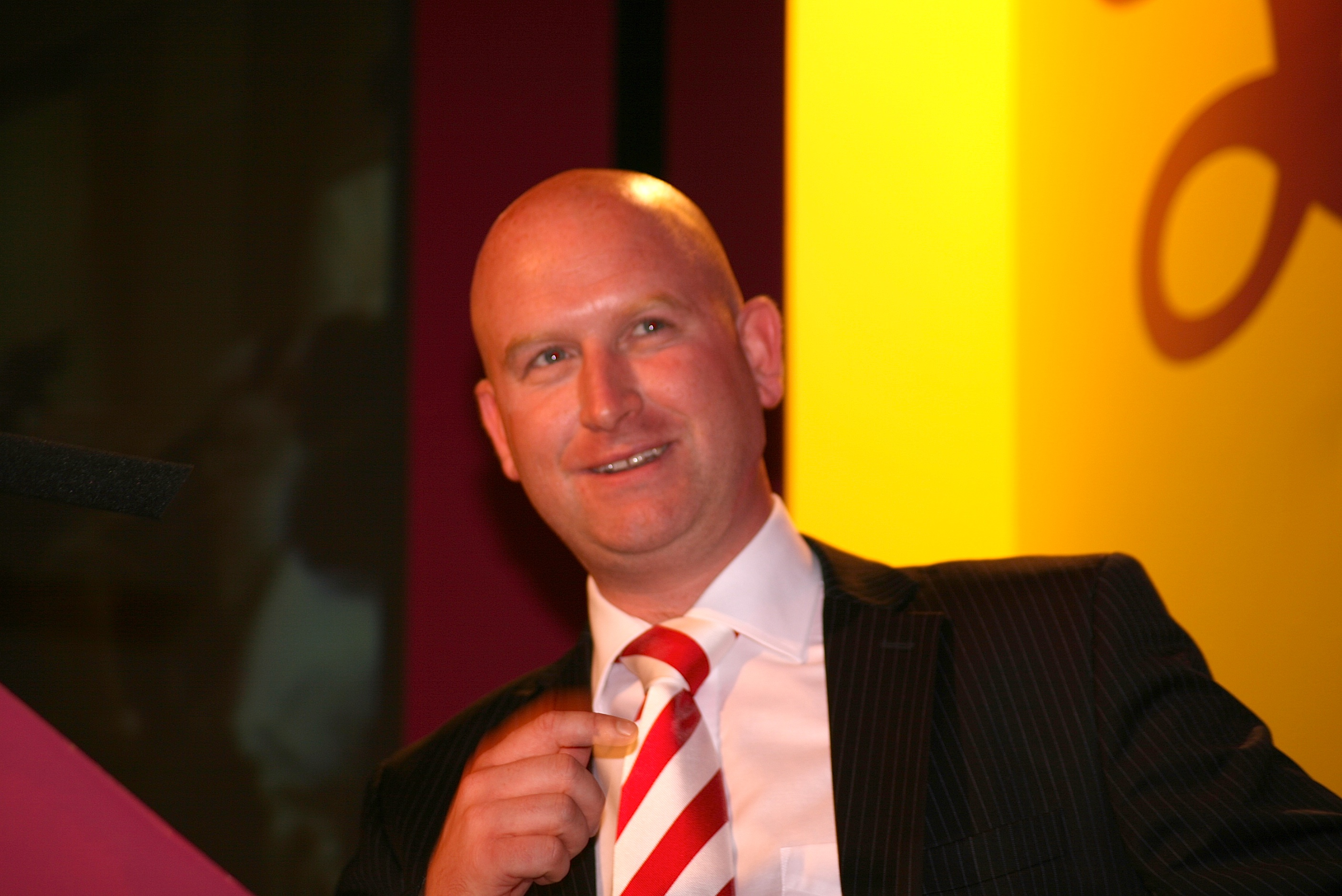
Nuttall speaking in 2009

In March 2015, Nuttall stated that "Twelve per cent of Catholics have already indicated that they are going to vote, or have already voted, UKIP. On moral issues, we, more than any other political party, are more in line with Catholic thought. Whether it's on gender-choice, abortion or same-sex marriage, we are absolutely 100 per cent behind the Catholic Church."

During his leadership bid in 2016, Nuttall pitched himself as the unity candidate and made Suzanne Evans co-deputy chairwoman of the party and Patrick O'Flynn his principal political adviser, both of whom have been seen as political foes of former UKIP leader Nigel Farage. Nuttall vowed in 2016 to "replace the Labour Party in the next five years and become the patriotic party of the working people".

Nuttall called for the establishment of an English parliament and presented UKIP's new devolution policy at its annual conference at Eastbourne in September 2011.

Influenced by his background, Nuttall has stated that there is an urgent need for a challenge in England's politics in the early 21st century to the dominance of what he has described as "cultural Marxism", which he accuses of "having changed the way we speak, and the way we think", adding: "They've made the downright nonsensical acceptable, and common sense unacceptable or politically 'incorrect'."

=== Abortion ===
Nuttall opposes abortion. He suggested in October 2016 that the current time limit on abortion be cut down from 24 weeks to 12 weeks. He is a member of the Society for the Protection of Unborn Children, the United Kingdom's largest anti-abortion organisation.

=== Islam ===
Nuttall favours a ban on wearing Islamic burqas in public places, citing the use of video surveillance and security as the primary reason for this stance, and is opposed to the establishment of Sharia courts to operate alongside the UK court system, stating: "It cannot be right we have courts or councils in this country where the words of a woman are only worth half that of a man. That has no place in a liberal, democratic functioning western democracy." He has also accused the EU's migration laws as allowing for the "free movement of jihad".

=== Capital punishment ===
Nuttall has supported the reintroduction of capital punishment for child murderers, serial killers, and those who kill police officers. He has signed an e-petition to this effect and stressed that it was UKIP's policy to put controversial policies such as capital punishment to a referendum before undertaking them.

=== Climate change ===
A global warming sceptic, Nuttall said that UKIP would ban Al Gore's An Inconvenient Truth from schools.

=== LGBT issues ===
Nuttall opposed Labour's plans to include LGBT-inclusive sex and relationship education in schools in 2015, stating that "Rather than helping tackle problems of domestic violence and rape in future years, as given as another woolly reason for introduction, it is going to confuse and worry these little children". Upon becoming UKIP leader, Nuttall faced criticism from Daily Politics presenter Jo Coburn over a lack of diversity in his appointments of only white men to prominent positions within UKIP. Nuttall accused Coburn of "splitting hairs" as "I've literally appointed three people. If you want diversity, Peter Whittle, my deputy, is an open homosexual."

=== UKIP peerages ===
In a 2016 interview with The Sunday Telegraph, Nuttall said that it was "obscene and unfair" that no UKIP politician had been appointed to the House of Lords by the government. He promised to hold inter-party talks with Prime Minister Theresa May on the issue, saying that, if peerages were given in proportion to vote count in the 2015 general election, UKIP should have 26 lords.

=== 2016 United States presidential election ===
Before the 2016 United States presidential election, Nuttall stated repeatedly that if he were an American citizen: "I would hold my nose and vote for Gary Johnson, the Libertarian candidate".

After the election he said "Neither the Brexit vote nor the Trump victory was down to emotion rather than truth. They were down to the people realising the truth that the establishment was not acting in their best interests." Nuttall was later mocked by social media users, including Rhondda MP Chris Bryant, after mistakenly saying that Trump's love of the United Kingdom makes him an "anglophobe", a word which means the opposite. Phillip Blond said that mocking Nuttall's language in this manner was an example of "laughing at working-class misuse of language", adding that "correcting people's speech is redolent with class [and] division"; however, others such as Oliver Kamm disagreed.

=== Views on the NHS ===
Nuttall posted on his website in June 2014 that "the very existence of the NHS stifles competition", and stated that "as long as the NHS is the 'sacred cow' of British politics, the longer the British people will suffer with a second-rate health service". This was later taken down from his website.

Upon becoming party leader, Nuttall told Andrew Marr on the Sunday Politics that "Maybe at some point, in years to come within this century we'll have to have this debate [over NHS privatisation], but it won't be under my leadership in UKIP". Following his 2016 UKIP leadership win, he said that his party would be "committed to keeping the NHS in public hands and free at the point of delivery".

=== Vladimir Putin and the Syrian civil war ===
On foreign policy, Nuttall said that he was "not a fan" of Putin's "reprehensible" persecution of Russian journalists. Nuttall has also said Britain "got it wrong" in "helping the so-called rebels" in the Syrian civil war. Asked about Syrian President Bashar al-Assad's barrel bombing of Syrian civilians, Nuttall said: "I wouldn't say we are some paragon of virtue when it comes to backing dictators" and that the Syrian government, which Russia is supporting militarily, is not "a threat to the globe in the way that Islamic terrorism is".

=== Waterboarding ===
Following comments by US president Donald Trump concerning the effectiveness of torture, Nuttall said techniques such as waterboarding could be justified if they saved lives. He stated: "I think sometimes you have to fight fire with fire. I think that these people are incarcerated because they are bad people and they want to do us harm, and if waterboarding ensures that it saves a number of lives in this country, or America, because someone admits to something that is going to happen in terms of a terrorist attack then through gritted teeth I probably would be OK with that."

== Hillsborough disaster ==
In 2016, Nuttall said that he thought police officers responsible for the Hillsborough disaster should be prosecuted.

An article published by The Guardian in February 2017 questioned his presence at the disaster, stating that his school had tried to account for all pupils who had been present there, and he was not on their list. The Guardian further alleged that a friend who had known Nuttall for over 25 years said that he had "never spoken" about Hillsborough. Nuttall said it was true that he was at Hillsborough and presented a letter of support from his father, adding in a newspaper interview that he did not like to talk about the disaster. UKIP issued a statement that said Nuttall was the victim of a smear campaign sanctioned by senior members of the Labour party. Nuttall said he had provided two written statements to The Guardian testifying to his presence and accused the newspaper of "twisting" the story.

A 2011 article on his website quoted him saying that he had lost "close personal friends" at Hillsborough, but in a radio interview during the build-up to the 2017 Stoke by-election he stated that the article was incorrect and that of those he knew who died at Hillsborough none were close personal friends. Nuttall said he did not check press releases posted by an aide in 2011 and 2012 and was "both appalled and very sorry that an impression was given that was not accurate". Nuttall's press officer said she was "entirely responsible" for the posting (which was reported by the BBC) and apologised and offered her resignation. The two chairmen of UKIP's Liverpool and Merseyside branch later resigned from the party, accusing Nuttall of being "unprofessional".

According to the New Statesman in 2017, these comments contributed to Nutall's unpopularity on Merseyside, where he was referred to by some locals during his tenure as UKIP leader as "wool" and "bad Bootle UKIP meff".

== Website profiles ==
Nuttall has been accused of fabricating parts of his career history. A profile on LinkedIn claimed that Nuttall had completed a PhD at Liverpool Hope University in 2004, although the institution did not exist as such until 2005 (it was previously the Liverpool Institute of Higher Education) and did not start awarding doctorates until 2009. In response, Nuttall said that an over-enthusiastic researcher was responsible for the PhD's appearance on the LinkedIn page. Nuttall said that in previous interviews he repeatedly spoke of his desire to finish his PhD, which he began in 2004.

In 2009, Nuttall's website claimed he was joining the board of the North West Training Council, a vocational training charity, but in 2017 The Guardian reported that the organisation's CEO said that Nuttall had never been invited and that his name did not appear in their documentation. In a speech to UKIP's spring conference in 2017, Nuttall said: "I take the blame for the fact that I failed to check what I put up on my website in my name. That is my fault and I apologise. But I do not apologise for what is a coordinated, cruel and almost evil smear campaign that has been directed at me. It is based on lies from sources who have not been named."

== Media ==
As of 7 June 2017 Nuttall was one of UKIP's media spokespeople and frequently appeared on national radio, including BBC Radio 5 Live and Talksport. He has appeared several times on BBC One's Question Time and BBC Radio 4's Any Questions?.

== Electoral performance ==
Nuttall has contested several UK and European Parliamentary elections as a UKIP candidate:

UK Parliament elections

Date of election	Constituency	Party	Votes	% of votes	Result
2005 general election	Bootle	UKIP	1,054	4.1	Not elected
2010 general election	Bootle	UKIP	2,514	6.1	Not elected
2011 by-election	Oldham East and Saddleworth	UKIP	2,029	5.8	Not elected
2015 general election	Bootle	UKIP	4,915	10.9	Not elected
2017 by-election	Stoke-on-Trent Central	UKIP	5,233	24.7	Not elected
2017 general election	Boston and Skegness	UKIP	3,308	7.7	Not elected

European Parliament elections

Date of election	Constituency	Party	Votes	% of votes	Result	No. of seats
2009 European election	North West England	UKIP	261,740	15.8	Elected	1 / 8
2014 European election	North West England	UKIP	481,932	27.5	Elected	3 / 8

Party political offices
Preceded by John Whittaker	Chair of the UK Independence Party; 2008–2010	Succeeded by Steve Crowther
Preceded by David Campbell Bannerman & The Viscount Monckton of Brenchley	Deputy Leader of the UK Independence Party; 2010–2016	Succeeded by Peter Whittle
Preceded by Nigel Farage; Acting	Leader of the UK Independence Party; 2016–2017	Succeeded by Steve Crowther; Acting
