= Kensington and Chelsea (constituency) =

UK Parliament constituency (1997–2010)

Coordinates: 51.494°N 0.186°W

- Former borough constituency for the House of Commons
- Boundary of Kensington and Chelsea in Greater London for the 2005 general election
- County: Greater London

1997–2010
- Created from: Kensington & Chelsea
- Replaced by: Kensington, Chelsea and Fulham

Kensington and Chelsea was a constituency represented in the House of Commons of the Parliament of the United Kingdom 1997–2010. It was one of the safest Conservative seats in the United Kingdom, and since its creation in 1997 became a prestigious seat, with MP Alan Clark, the former Defence Secretary Michael Portillo and the former Foreign Secretary Malcolm Rifkind all holding the seat for the Conservatives. The seat was abolished for the 2010 election, when the 1974–1997 Kensington constituency was recreated and Chelsea formed a new constituency together with the southern part of the former Hammersmith and Fulham constituency, called the Chelsea and Fulham constituency.

== Boundaries ==
The constituency covered the central and southern portions of the Royal Borough of Kensington and Chelsea, covering the centres of both Kensington and Chelsea. This covered the following wards of the borough:

- Abingdon, Brompton, Campden, Cheyne, Church, Courtfield, Earls Court, Hans Town, Holland, Norland, North Stanley, Pembridge, Queen's Gate, Redcliffe, Royal Hospital, South Stanley.

Following their review of parliamentary boundaries in North London, the Boundary Commission created two new constituencies based on the existing Kensington and Chelsea constituency, which were first contested at the 2010 election. The northern section (Earls Court, South Kensington, Kensington High Street and Holland Park) was combined with the southern section of the previous Regent's Park and Kensington North constituency (including Ladbroke Grove and Notting Hill) to create a new Kensington constituency, whilst the southern part (Chelsea) was combined with the southern half of the former Hammersmith and Fulham constituency to create a new Chelsea and Fulham constituency.

== History ==
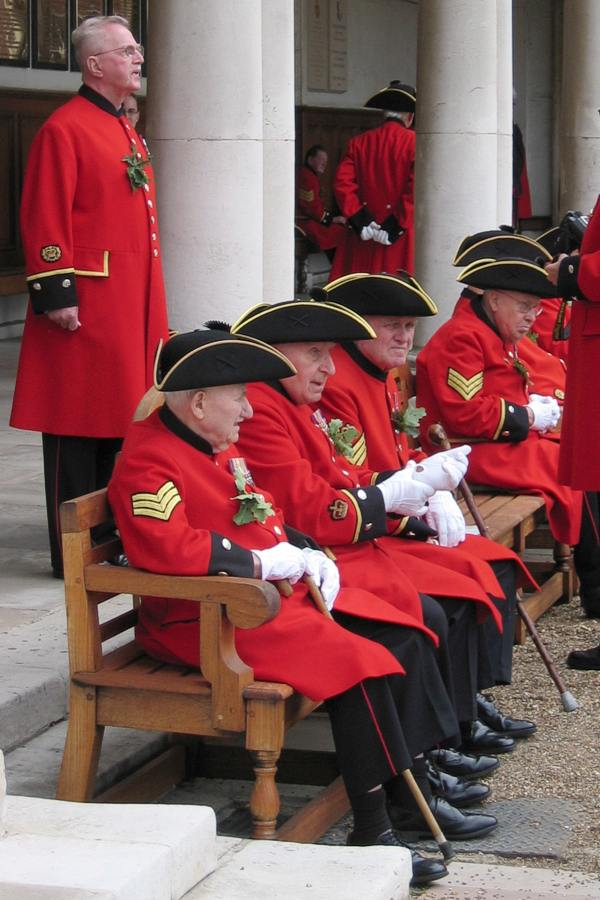
Constituents include the Chelsea pensioners.

The constituency was created for the 1997 general election. Notional calculations indicated that it would be one of the safest Conservative seats in the country and so the Conservative nomination was much sought. In the run-up to the 1997 election the nomination was initially won by Nicholas Scott, MP for the previous Chelsea constituency, but following allegations of alcoholism he was deselected.

The nomination was subsequently secured by Alan Clark, the former minister and diarist who was seeking to return to the Commons after standing down at the 1992 general election. Clark was elected, but died of brain cancer in 1999 after only two years in office. As a safe Conservative seat in London there was much speculation that former Defence Secretary and widely predicted future Conservative leader Michael Portillo would seek to return to the Commons after losing the Enfield Southgate constituency in the 1997 election. Portillo was elected in the subsequent by-election and became Shadow Chancellor but his subsequent career stalled and he crashed out of the 2001 Conservative leadership election and returned to the backbenches. In 2003 he announced his intention to retire from politics at the next general election to pursue a career in the media. Another former Cabinet Minister, who had also lost his seat in 1997, Malcolm Rifkind, was nominated for the seat in Portillo's stead and elected at the 2005 general election.

In October 2007, amid speculation that then-Prime Minister Gordon Brown was about to call a snap general election, former Labour minister Tony Benn announced that he wanted to come out of retirement and return to the Commons, offering himself to the Kensington and Chelsea constituency Labour Party to challenge Malcolm Rifkind. Ultimately, however, no election was held that year, and the Kensington and Chelsea seat was abolished for the 2010 election.

== Members of Parliament ==
Election	Member	Party
1997	Alan Clark	Conservative
1999 by-election	Michael Portillo	Conservative
2005	Malcolm Rifkind	Conservative
2010	constituency abolished: see Kensington and Chelsea and Fulham	

== Elections ==
=== Elections in the 2000s ===
General election 2005: Kensington and Chelsea
Party	Candidate	Votes	%	±%
Conservative	Malcolm Rifkind	18,144	57.9	+3.4
Liberal Democrats	Jennifer Kingsley	5,726	18.3	+2.5
Labour	Catherine Atkinson	5,521	17.6	−5.6
Green	Julia Stephenson	1,342	4.3	+0.2
UKIP	Mildred Eiloart	395	1.3	−0.2
Independent	Alfred Bovill	107	0.3	New
Alliance for Green Socialism	Eddie Adams	101	0.3	New
Majority		12,418	39.6	+8.3
Turnout		31,336	50.0	+6.7
Conservative hold		Swing	+0.5	

General election 2001: Kensington and Chelsea
Party	Candidate	Votes	%	±%
Conservative	Michael Portillo	15,270	54.5	+0.9
Labour	Simon Stanley	6,499	23.2	–4.7
Liberal Democrats	Kishwer Falkner	4,416	15.8	+0.5
Green	Julia Stephenson	1,158	4.1	N/A
UKIP	Damian Hockney	416	1.5	N/A
ProLife Alliance	Josephine Quintavalle	179	0.6	New
Jam Wrestling	Ginger Crab	100	0.4	New
Majority		8,771	31.3	+5.6
Turnout		28,038	43.3	–11.4
Conservative hold		Swing	+2.8	

=== Elections in the 1990s ===
By-election 1999: Kensington and Chelsea
Party	Candidate	Votes	%	±%
Conservative	Michael Portillo	11,004	56.4	+2.8
Labour	Robert Atkinson	4,298	22.0	–5.9
Liberal Democrats	Robert Woodthorpe Browne	1,831	9.4	–5.9
Pro-Euro Conservative	John Stevens	740	3.8	New
UKIP	Damian Hockney	450	2.3	+0.8
Green	Hugo Charlton	446	2.3	New
Democratic Party	Charles Beauclerk	182	0.9	New
Legalise Cannabis	Colin Paisley	141	0.7	New
Independent	Michael Irwin	97	0.5	New
UK Pensioners Party	Paul Oliver	75	0.4	–0.1
Referendum	Stephen Scott-Fawcett	57	0.3	New
Independent	Louise Hodges	48	0.3	New
Natural Law	Gerard 'Ged' Valente	35	0.2	–0.1
People's Net Dream Ticket Party	Lisa Lovebucket	26	0.1	New
Environmentalist	John Davies	24	0.1	New
Equal Parenting Party	Peter May	24	0.1	New
Monster Raving Loony	Howling Laud Hope	20	0.1	New
Independent	Tonysamuelsondotcom	15	0.1	New
Majority		6,706	34.4	+8.7
Turnout		19,513	29.7	−25.0
Conservative hold		Swing		

General election 1997: Kensington and Chelsea
Party	Candidate	Votes	%	±%
Conservative	Alan Clark	19,887	53.6	–14.6
Labour	Robert Atkinson	10,368	27.9	+11.3
Liberal Democrats	Robert Woodthorpe Browne	5,668	15.3	+2.1
UKIP	Angela Ellis-Jones	540	1.5	New
Teddy Bear Alliance	Edward Bear	218	0.6	New
UK Pensioners Party	Paul Oliver	176	0.5	New
Natural Law	Susan J. Hamza	122	0.3	New
Rainbow Dream Ticket	Paul Sullivan	65	0.2	New
Independent	Pete Parliament	44	0.1	New
Majority		9,519	25.7	N/A
Turnout		36,548	54.7	N/A
Conservative hold		Swing	-12.9	

== See also ==
- parliamentary constituencies in London
- 1999 Kensington and Chelsea by-election
