= Institute for Advanced Studies in the Humanities =

Institute for arts, humanities and social sciences at the University of Edinburgh

Coordinates: 55°56′32″N 3°11′10″W

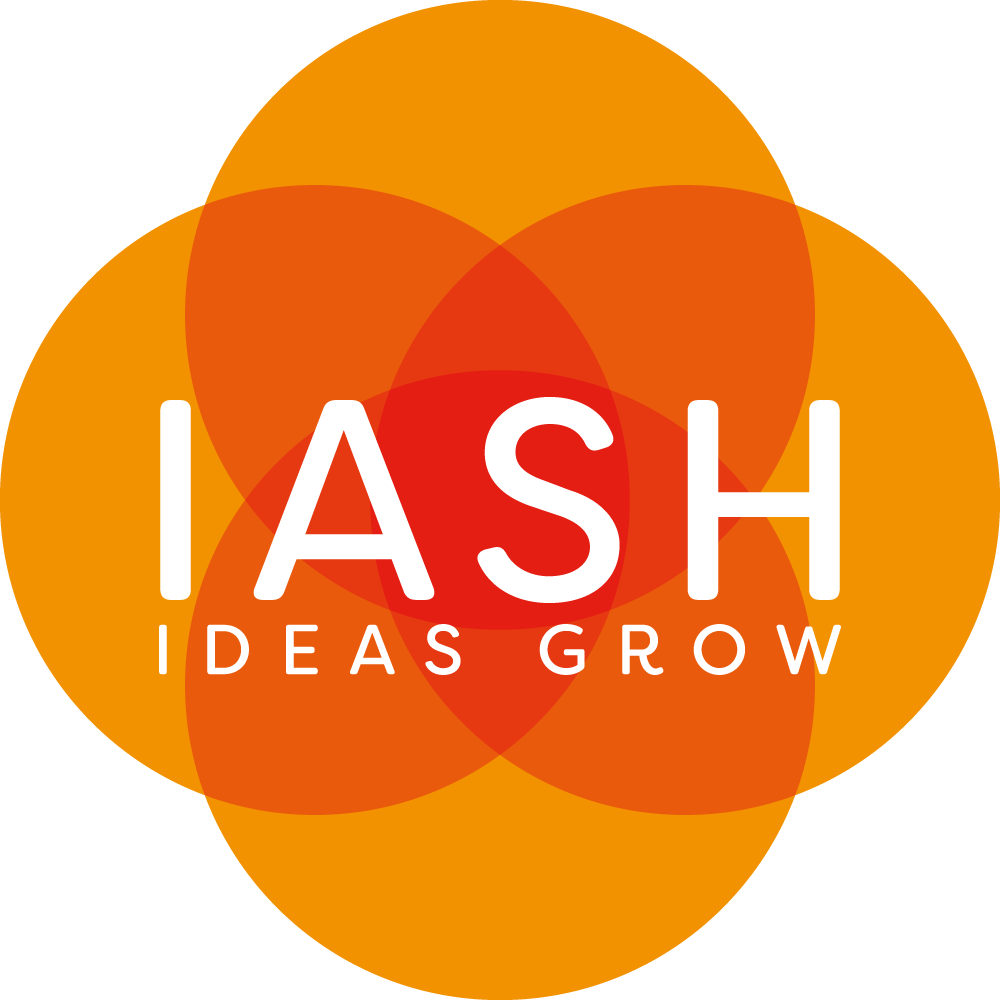
- Motto: Ideas Grow
- Established: 1969; 57 years ago
- Founders: John MacQueen, C. H. Waddington
- Affiliations: University of Edinburgh
- Director: Tobias Kelly
- Administrative staff: 3
- Location: Edinburgh, Scotland
- Website: www.iash.ed.ac.uk

The Institute for Advanced Studies in the Humanities (IASH) was founded in 1969 at the University of Edinburgh for visiting fellows to engage in study and research in the arts, humanities and social sciences. The current director (since 2026) is Tobias Kelly. Other directors have included David Daiches, Susan Manning, Jo Shaw, Steve Yearley and Lesley McAra.

Since 1969, IASH has received visits from over 1,500 fellows. Up to 25 Fellows are in residence at any one time, and visits last between two and ten months. Each year IASH hosts the University of Edinburgh's annual Fulbright-Scotland Visiting Professorship. Notable former Fellows include Marianne Boruch, William C. Dowling, Sébastien Fath, Ruth Barcan Marcus, Edward Mendelson, Garry Wills, and Charles W.J. Withers.

IASH hosts or organises over 100 events per year.

The IASH advisory board includes Rosi Braidotti and Allan Little. It is chaired by Sarah Prescott.

IASH is located in Hope Park Square off Meadow Lane in Edinburgh. The institute, its fellows and its building appear in three of Alexander McCall Smith's novels, and a fellowship named after their heroine Isabel Dalhousie was founded in 2012.

== History ==
=== Founding ===
While there is not a fixed date of conception, IASH was formally launched in 1969, and remains the only Institute for Advanced Study in Scotland.

The proposal for IASH was made by John MacQueen, professor of Scottish literature and oral tradition (1955–80) and Conrad Hal Waddington, professor of animal genetics (1947–75) in 1967. This time saw an expansion of universities, academic specialization, and the desire for reform in teaching and research with greater interdisciplinarity. The founders had been inspired by the Dublin Institute for Advanced Studies and the Princeton IAS and aimed to create a similar institute at Edinburgh. However, from the outset, IASH diverged significantly from its predecessors and was entirely devoted to scholarly integration, wanting to provide a bridge between the then sparingly connected arts faculties and the newly emerging social sciences.

=== Early years ===
In 1970, the first fellows were elected and expected to conduct their research and give lectures and seminars to attract outside interest, and, once their fellowship ended, to move on: a pragmatic approach from IASH's cofounder, Professor MacQueen.

During the ‘social turn’ of academia in the 1960s and 1970s, the variety of subjects at IASH and the elevated level of academic position allowed the institute to capitalise on its interdisciplinarity. A project on the bicentenary of the birth of Sir Walter Scott, as well as the Institute Project on the Scottish Enlightenment (IPSE ’86), which produced the exhibition ‘A Hotbed of Genius’ shown in the Royal Museum of Scotland (now the National Museum of Scotland) led to its reputation in Scottish Studies. However, other fields of study for IASH were pursued, such as the Renaissance and Indo-European and Northern studies. Visiting speakers in the 1970s included Edwin Morgan, A. J. P. Taylor, Harriet Harvey Wood, Hugh Trevor-Roper and Eric Hobsbawm.

Endowments in 1984 and 1987 from Sophie Gifford, the wife of the late T. J. Carlyle Gifford, formerly chancellor's assessor of Edinburgh and the founder of Baillie Gifford in Edinburgh, made it possible for the institute to independently and continuously fund fellowships, increasing its geographic diversity, for example with scholars from former eastern bloc nations and non-European nations, such as Argentina, Singapore, and India. Through the establishment of international links to other academic institutions, for example the Humanities Research Center in Canberra, and the Charles Wallace India Trust, IASH established new fellowships and adopted a broader and more diverse intellectual reach.

Between 1991 and 1995, IASH launched its third Institute Project, Scots at War, funded by the Scots at War Trust, establishing research to collate information about Scots who served in the armed and civilian services in the twentieth century. The project attracted much public and academic response, especially through the patronage of HRH Prince Philip the Duke of Edinburgh and the support of Sir David Smith, principal of the University of Edinburgh (1987–1994).

=== The 21st century ===
In 2000, IASH was incorporated into the newly created College of Humanities and Social Science at the University of Edinburgh. In 2005, Susan Manning was appointed as director, the first woman to do so. Manning continued the Institute's international traditions, while also increasing its interdisciplinarity through the Institute Project titled The Science of Man.

IASH's role changed drastically between 2000 and 2013. The nature of IASH fellows shifted from older, established male academics to supporting postdoctoral researchers and early career academics. By 2013, the number of female fellows had risen to 47 per cent.

The 1000th Fellow was Dr Matthew Bampton in 2015.

Since 2015, IASH has presented lectures by Wole Soyinka, Lord Stern, David Miliband and Michael Ignatieff. Recent Institute Projects include the Dangerous Women Project (2016–17) and the Institute Project on Decoloniality (2021–24).

Directors of IASH
Name	Term
William Beattie	1972–1980
David Daiches	1980–1986
Peter Jones	1986–2000
John Frow	2000–2004
Susan Manning	2005–2013
Jo Shaw	2014–2017
Steve Yearley	2017–2022
Lesley McAra	2022–2026
Tobias Kelly	2026–

=== Notable alumni ===
- Ae-ran Kim
- Alison Light
- Anahid Nersessian
- Bhakti Shringarpure
- Caspar Weinberger
- Dolly Jørgensen
- Femi Osofisan
- Geetanjali Shree
- Harini Amarasuriya
- Irene Ng
- Sir Ludovic Kennedy
- Sir Malcolm Rifkind
- Margie Orford
- Senator Masao Kunihiro
- Michael Longley
- Nicola Dahrendorf
- Ola Uduku
- Olive Lewin
- Baroness O'Neill of Bengarve
- Sir Paul Reeves
- Perri 6
- Phyllis Lambert
- Raghunandan Swarup Pathak
- Richard Sezibera
- Dame Sally Mapstone
- Sandro Jung
- Shu-Fang Lai
- Soraya de Chadarevian
- Uğur Ümit Üngör

=== Premises ===
The first Fellows took up residence at 12 Buccleuch Place in 1970. Built in the 1780s by John Simpson and Alexander Deans, 12 Buccleuch Place is a 4-storey tenement sporting a Roman Doric pilastered and corniced doorpiece to the front and a full height bowed bay window at the rear overlooking a garden. Notable former residents include Christian Isobel Johnstone, journalist, author and a significant early feminist. In 1973, IASH moved to larger premises at 17 Buccleuch Place, next door to the house where The Edinburgh Review was founded in 1802 by Francis Jeffrey.

By 1985, IASH had outgrown Buccleuch Place and moved to Hope Park Square. 1-5 Hope Park Square is an L-shaped tenement block of three storeys, created by combining five separate Victorian flats into a single building. The tenements were built around 1849, adjoining the western side of 6 Hope Park Square; this was originally Hope House, an 18th-century villa built by Sir Thomas Hope of Rankeillor. He laid out a park area on the neighbouring Meadows (originally named Hope Park) from 1722 on the site of the drained Borough Loch.

1-5 Hope Park Square first appears on the Edinburgh Ordnance Survey map of 1849. The majority of Hope Park Square was remodelled as small tenements circa 1860.

In 1902, author and critic Dame Rebecca West lived with her mother and sisters at 2 Hope Park Square before moving to Buccleuch Place to attend George Watson's Ladies College. Hope Park Square appears in her 1922 novel The Judge, renamed Hume Park Square, and home to her teenage heroine Ellen Melville. West's memories of poverty in the area strongly inflect her rendering of the tenements:

Beyond the archway lay the queerest place. It was a little box-like square, hardly forty paces across, on three sides of which small squat houses sat closely with a quarrelling air, as if each had to broaden its shoulders and press out its elbows for fear of being squeezed out by its neighbours and knocked backwards into the mews. They sent out in front of them the slimmest slices of garden which left room for nothing but a paved walk from the entry and a fenced bed in the middle, where a lamppost stood among some leggy laurels, which the rain was shaking as a terrier shakes a rat.

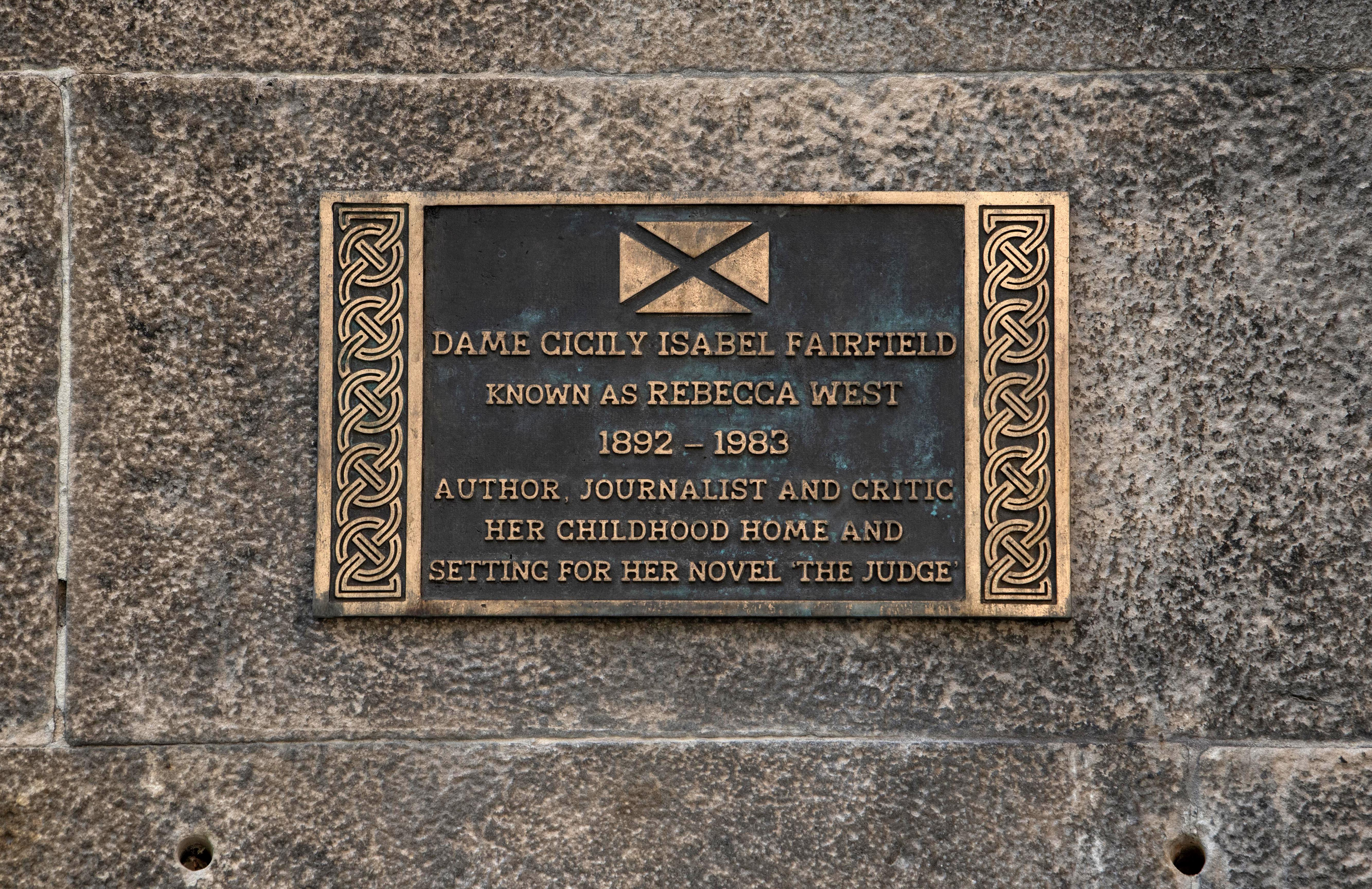
A Historic Environment Scotland Plaque to Dame Cecily Isabel Fairfield, also known as Rebecca West

A Historic Environment Scotland plaque to West is mounted on the facade of 2 Hope Park Square.

From 1963, the building was home to the university's Department of Artificial Intelligence, researching Machine Intelligence and Experimental Programming. Freddy the Robot I was developed there between 1969 and 1971, and its brother, Freddy II, is now housed at the National Museum of Scotland. The small functional programming language Hope was developed on the premises around 1978 by Rod Burstall, David MacQueen and Don Sannella.
