= Thames Valley (disambiguation) =

Thames Valley is an area of England covering the River Thames west of London. Thames Valley may refer to:

== Canada ==
- Thames Valley, an area in and around London, Ontario
- Thames Valley, Ontario
- Thames Valley College (London, Ontario)

== England ==
- Thames Valley (European Parliament constituency) (1979–1999)
- Thames Valley Police, a Police Force covering Berkshire, Buckinghamshire and Oxfordshire
- Thames Valley University, former name of University of West London
- ITV Thames Valley, a former ITV region
- M4 corridor, part of which is synonymous with the Thames Valley

== New Zealand ==
- Thames Valley, New Zealand
