= Brendan Donnelly (politician) =

British politician (born 1950)

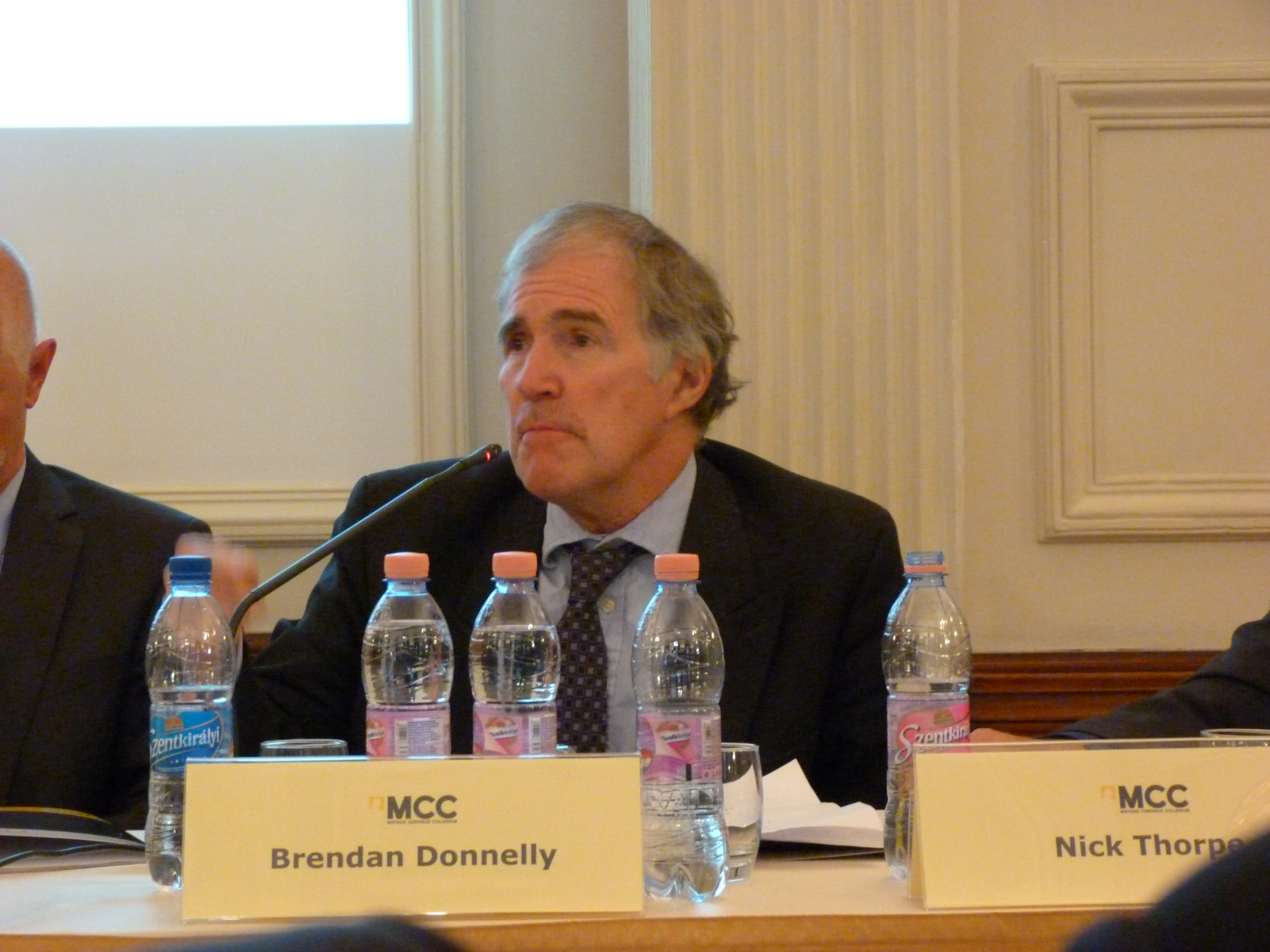
- Donnelly in 2014

Chairman of Rejoin EU
- Incumbent
- Assumed office 2024
- Leader: Richard Morley
- Preceded by: Richard Hewison

Deputy Leader of Pro-Euro Conservative Party
- In office 10 March 1999 – 10 December 2001
- Leader: John Stevens
- Preceded by: Office established
- Succeeded by: Office abolished

Member of the European Parliament for Sussex South and Crawley
- In office 9 June 1994 – 10 June 1999
- Preceded by: Constituency created
- Succeeded by: Constituency abolished

Personal details
- Born: Brendan Patrick Donnelly; 25 August 1950 (age 76) London, England
- Party: Rejoin EU (since 2021)
- Other political affiliations: Alliance EPP: European People's Party UK (2014–2021); Yes2Europe (2009–2014); Liberal Democrats (1999–2009); Pro-Euro Conservative Party (1999); Conservatives (before 1999)
- Education: Christ Church, Oxford
- Occupation: Politician; Director of the Federal Trust; Chair of the Federal Union (until 6 March 2010)
- Known for: Pro-Europeanism

Brendan Patrick Donnelly (born 25 August 1950) is a British pro-European Union politician who has been the chairman of Rejoin EU since 2024. Donnelly previously served as the Member of the European Parliament (MEP) for the Sussex South and Crawley constituency from 1994 to 1999.

== Background ==
Born in London, Donnelly was educated at St Ignatius' College in Tottenham, and then at Christ Church, Oxford. He worked at the Foreign Office from 1976 until 1982, when he joined the secretariat of the Conservative Group in the European Parliament. From 1986 to 1987, he was a political adviser to Lord Cockfield, and then from 1987 to 1990 worked as an independent consultant on the European Community. At the 1989 European Parliament election, he stood unsuccessfully for the Conservatives in London West.

Donnelly was elected as a Member of the European Parliament (MEP) in Sussex South and Crawley at the 1994 European Parliament election for the Conservative Party. He then left the party, continued as an independent for a period, and then co-founded and became deputy leader of the Pro-Euro Conservative Party at the 1999 European elections.

He failed to get elected and subsequently joined the Liberal Democrats. He stood in the 2009 European elections under the Yes2Europe political label. He stood in the 2014 European elections for the 4 Freedoms Party (UK EPP). He stood in the 2021 London Assembly election for Rejoin EU. He was unsuccessful in each case. He stood for Rejoin EU in the June 2021 Chesham and Amersham by-election, and also ran in Finchley and Golders Green for the 2024 United Kingdom general election. In March 2025, he was a candidate in a local by-election for Finchley Church End ward in Barnet finishing in 6th place.

Donnelly is director of the Federal Trust, and was chair of the Federal Union until 6 March 2010, when he was succeeded by Richard Laming.

Party political offices
New political party	Deputy Leader of the Pro-Euro Conservative Party; 1999–2001	Party dissolved
Preceded by Richard Hewison	Chairman of Rejoin EU; 2024–present	Incumbent
European Parliament
New constituency	Member of the European Parliament for Sussex South and Crawley; 1994–1999	Constituency abolished
