= Thames Valley College =

Thames Valley College is the name of several current or historic institutions:

- Thames Valley College (London, Ontario), a career college in Canada
- Thames Valley University, a British university based on campuses in Slough, Reading and Ealing, all in the Thames Valley area west of London
