= 1999 Kensington and Chelsea by-election =

UK parliamentary by-election

- 25 November 1999

Kensington and Chelsea parliamentary seat
- Turnout: 29.7% ▼25.0%
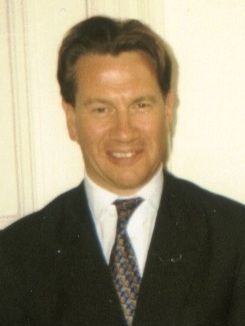

	First party	Second party	Third party
Candidate	Michael Portillo	Robert Atkinson	Robert Woodthorpe Browne
Party	Conservative	Labour	Liberal Democrats
Popular vote	11,004	4,298	1,831
Percentage	56.4%	22.0%	9.4%
Swing	▲2.8%	▼5.9%	▼5.9%
MP before election
Alan Clark
Conservative
Subsequent MP
Michael Portillo
Conservative

A by-election for the United Kingdom parliamentary constituency of Kensington and Chelsea was held on 25 November 1999, following the death of incumbent Conservative Party Member of Parliament (MP) Alan Clark. Conservative grandee Michael Portillo – who had lost his seat in a shock result at the 1997 general election two years prior – stood as the Conservative candidate and held the seat for the party.

Clark died of a brain tumour on 5 September 1999, triggering a by-election to fill his seat. This was the first safe Conservative seat to have a by-election in the 1997–2001 UK Parliament. There was immediate speculation that Michael Portillo, the most high-profile casualty of the 1997 general election, would use it to return to frontline politics. Portillo immediately confirmed his interest in the seat, but was then confronted with the publication of an interview he had given previously that summer in which he had confirmed that while at Peterhouse, Cambridge he had had homosexual affairs.

Portillo was selected as Conservative candidate but faced demonstrations organised by gay rights group OutRage! and its principal campaigner Peter Tatchell who protested against his vote for an unequal age of consent for gay and straight sex, and support for the ban on homosexuality in the UK armed forces while Secretary of State for Defence. Tatchell continued to try to confront Portillo throughout the election, not assuaged by Portillo saying that he had changed his mind on the age of consent.

The Labour Party selected Robert Atkinson, who had fought the 1997 election and was a local councillor. The Liberal Democrats also renominated their general election candidate, Robert Woodthorpe Browne. Because of the prominence of the by-election in central London and the big political name, there were a wide variety of fringe and minor party candidates. Polling day was 25 November. Portillo was returned safely to Parliament.

== Result ==
1999 by-election: Kensington and Chelsea
Party	Candidate	Votes	%	±%
Conservative	Michael Portillo	11,003	56.4	+2.8
Labour	Robert Atkinson	4,298	22.0	–5.9
Liberal Democrats	Robert Woodthorpe Browne	1,831	9.4	–5.9
Pro-Euro Conservative	John Stevens	740	3.8	New
UKIP	Damian Hockney	450	2.3	+0.9
Green	Hugo Charlton	446	2.3	New
Democratic Party	The Earl of Burford	196	0.9	New
Legalise Cannabis	Colin Paisley	141	0.7	New
Independent	Michael Irwin	97	0.5	New
UK Pensioners Party	Paul Oliver	75	0.4	–0.1
Referendum	Stephen Scott-Fawcett	57	0.3	New
Independent	Louise Hodges	48	0.3	New
Natural Law	Gerard 'Ged' Valente	35	0.2	–0.1
People's Net Dream Ticket Party	Lisa Lovebucket	26	0.1	New
Environmentalist	John Davies	24	0.1	New
Equal Parenting Party	Peter May	24	0.1	New
Monster Raving Loony	Howling Laud Hope	20	0.1	New
Independent	Tonysamuelsondotcom	15	0.1	New
Majority		6,706	34.4	+8.7
Turnout		19,510	29.7	–25.0
Conservative hold		Swing		

== Previous result ==
General election 1997: Kensington and Chelsea
Party	Candidate	Votes	%	±%
Conservative	Alan Clark	19,887	53.6	−14.6
Labour	Robert Atkinson	10,368	27.9	+11.3
Liberal Democrats	Robert Woodthorpe Browne	5,668	15.3	+2.1
Teddy Bear Alliance	Edward Bear	218	0.6	New
United Kingdom Pensioners Party	Paul Oliver	176	0.5	New
Natural Law	Susan Hamza	122	0.3	New
Rainbow Dream Ticket	Paul Sullivan	65	0.2	New
Independent	Pete Parliament	44	0.1	New
Majority		9,519	25.7	–25.9
Turnout		36,548	54.7	
Conservative hold		Swing	-12.9	

== See also ==
- Lists of United Kingdom by-elections
