= Susan Manning =

Susan Manning may refer to:

- Susan Manning (American academic), dance historian and professor of English and theatre
- Susan Manning (Scottish academic) (1953–2013), professor specialising in Scottish studies and English literature
