= Sussex South and Crawley (European Parliament constituency) =

Former European Parliament constituency

- European Parliament constituency
- Boundary within South East England and London (1994-1999)
- Member state: United Kingdom
- Created: 1994
- Dissolved: 1999
- MEPs: 1

Prior to its uniform adoption of proportional representation in 1999, the United Kingdom used first-past-the-post for the European elections in England, Scotland and Wales. The European Parliament constituencies used under that system were smaller than the later regional constituencies and only had one Member of the European Parliament each.

The constituency of Sussex South and Crawley was one of them.

It consisted of the Westminster Parliament constituencies of Brighton Kemptown, Brighton Pavilion, Crawley, Hove, Mid Sussex, Shoreham, and Worthing.

== MEPs ==
Elected	Member	Party
1994	Brendan Donnelly	Conservative
1999	Brendan Donnelly	Pro-Euro Conservative
1999	Constituency abolished: see South East England	

== Election results ==
European Parliament election, 1994: Sussex South and Crawley
Party	Candidate	Votes	%	±%
Conservative	Brendan Donnelly	62,860	33.9	
Labour	Mrs. Joyce Edmond Smith	61,114	33.0	
Liberal Democrats	D. J. (John) Williams	41,410	22.3	
Green	Miss Pauline J. Beever	9,348	5.1	
Independent Euro Sceptic	David Horner	7,106	3.8	
Independent	J. N. P. (Nigel) Furness	2,618	1.4	
Natural Law	Alex M. A. Hankey	901	0.5	
Majority		1,746	0.9	
Turnout		185,357	37.6	
Conservative win (new seat)				
