= ANQ (journal) =

- Discipline: English literature
- Language: English
- Edited by: Sandro Jung

Publication details
- Former name(s): American Notes and Queries
- History: 1988–present
- Publisher: Taylor and Francis (United States)
- Frequency: Quarterly

Standard abbreviations
- ISO 4: ANQ

Indexing
- ISSN: 0895-769X (print); 1940-3364 (web)
- LCCN: 88645858
- OCLC no.: 889430245

Links
- Journal homepage; Online archive

ANQ: A Quarterly Journal of Short Articles, Notes and Reviews is a quarterly academic journal, affiliated with the University of Kentucky, which features short research-based articles about the literature of the English-speaking world and the language of literature.

The journal is published by Taylor and Francis and its editor-in-chief is Sandro Jung.

Previous incarnations of this journal include American Notes and Queries: A Medium for intercommunication for literary men, general readers etc. (Philadelphia, 1888–1892), Searcher: An American Notes and Queries (Philadelphia, 1895–96), American Notes and Queries: A Journal for the Curious (New York, 1941–1950), established by Walter Pilkington and B. Alterslund, and American Notes and Queries (New Haven, 1962–1986), edited and published by Lee Ash. The title of the journal was related to other journals started in the 19th century, such as the British Notes and Queries, Canadian Notes & Queries, and New Zealand Notes and Queries.

== Abstracting and indexing ==
- EBSCOhost Online Research Databases
- MLA International Bibliography
- Scopus
