= S. F. Newcombe =

British Army officer

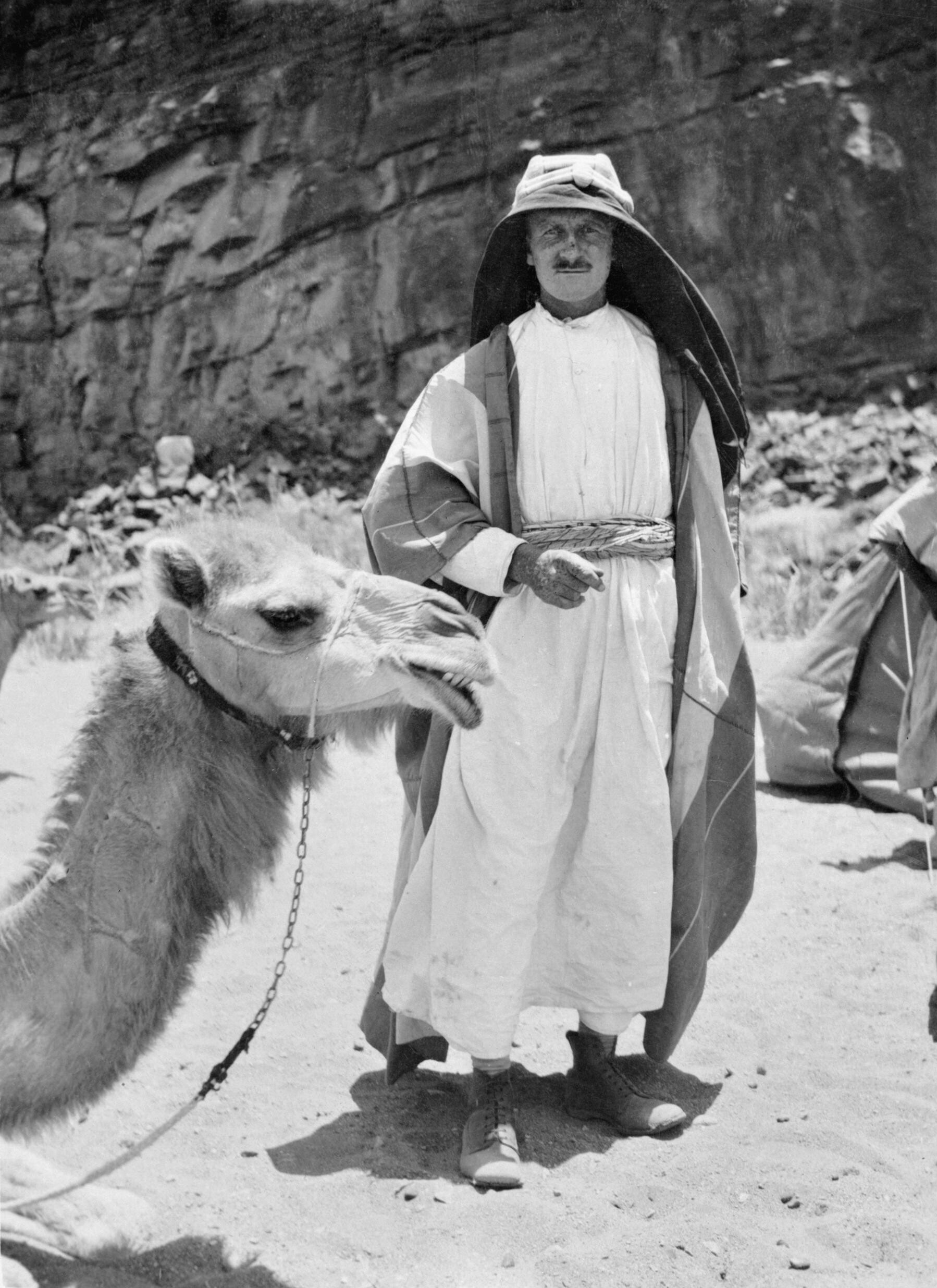
Lieutenant Colonel S F Newcombe wearing Arab dress, March 1917

Stewart Francis Newcombe (1878–1956) was a British army officer who fought in World War I. He gave his name to the Paulet-Newcombe Agreement, which represents most of the modern border between today's Syria, Lebanon, and Israel.

He was commissioned in the Royal Engineers in 1898 and fought in the Second Boer War. He served with the Egyptian Army from May 1901 until 1911. In 1913 and 1914 he was engaged in strategic survey work in the Sinai Peninsula, where he worked with and became a friend of T. E. Lawrence.

At the end of 1916, he was appointed Chief of the British Military Mission in the Hejaz where he again worked with Lawrence and played a key role in the Arab Revolt. In November 1917 Newcombe was captured by the Turks but escaped and went into hiding in Istanbul. He held the rank of lieutenant colonel.

== Early life ==
Newcombe was born in Brecon, Wales, the son of Edward Newcombe, and educated at Christ's Hospital and Felsted. He entered the Royal Military Academy, Woolwich where he was awarded the Sword of Honour. Commissioned in the Royal Engineers in 1898, he served in the Second Boer War. He served with the Egyptian Army from May 1901 until 1911.

== Surveying work ==
In 1913 and the early part of 1914, following short spells at the War Office, he carried out a survey across the Sinai Peninsula to Beersheba, under the auspices of the Palestine Exploration Fund. He was joined by Leonard Woolley and T. E. Lawrence who had been appointed as archaeological experts. The Negev Desert was of strategic importance, as it would have to be crossed by any Ottoman army attacking Egypt in the event of war and the survey updated mapping of the area, showing features of military relevance such as water sources. This began a lifelong friendship and collaboration with Lawrence who would become famous as "Lawrence of Arabia".

== First World War ==
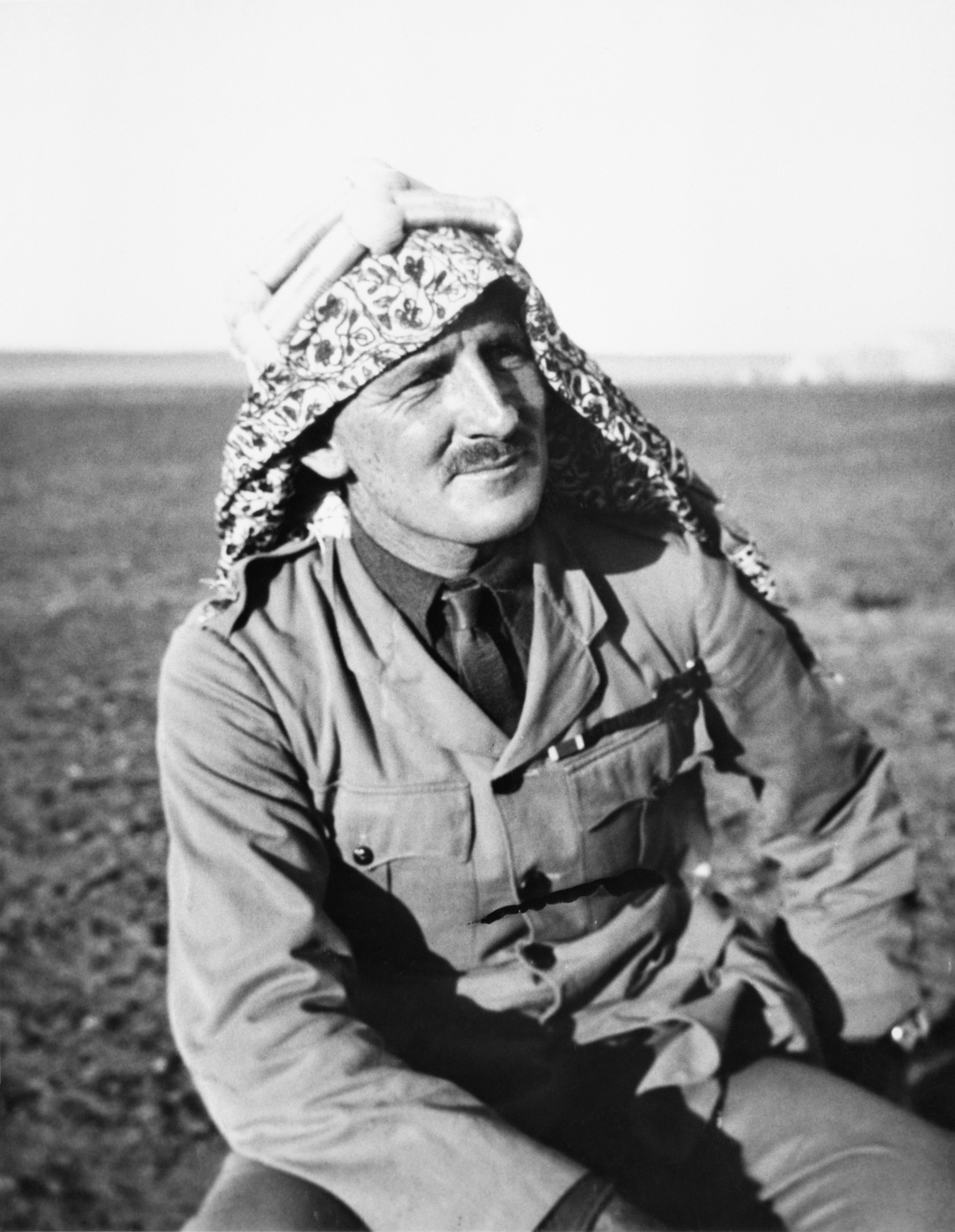

When Turkey entered the First World War, Newcombe was sent out to Egypt as assistant to Gilbert Clayton, who was head of both the Military and Political Intelligence Services there. Among the picked group of officers who worked with Newcombe were George Lloyd, Aubrey Herbert, Woolley and Lawrence.

Newcombe served at Gallipoli from September 1915 until December 1915, and was awarded the D.S.O.: "For conspicuous gallantry and devotion to duty near Anzac, Gallipoli Peninsula, on 29 October 1915. During rescue operations he entered a mine tunnel soon after the first casualties were reported, and, although suffering from the effects of fumes, he continued to lead rescue parties till he was completely disabled by the gas". Five men died in the rescue in Tunnel C2.

At the end of 1916, after a spell in France, he was appointed Chief of the British Military Mission with the Sharif of Mecca's forces in the Hejaz where he again worked with Lawrence and played a key role in the Arab Revolt.

After the capture of Wejh, the demolition raids on the Hejaz Railway were largely his work, along with his colleague Major Henry Hornby. Lawrence was later to pay Newcombe a blended compliment in his book Seven Pillars of Wisdom when he wrote; 'Newcombe is like fire,' they (the Arabs) used to complain, 'he burns friend and enemy', referring to his enthusiasm for destroying this vital artery that supplied the besieged Ottoman garrison in Medina.

Newcombe was captured during the Third Battle of Gaza leading a party of seventy men of the Imperial Camel Corps behind enemy lines to cut the Hebron road with machine-gun fire to prevent the Turkish garrison of Beersheba escaping the British advance. During heavy fighting with several Turkish battalions his force was surrounded and forced to surrender after running out of ammunition on 2 November 1917.

Newcombe was held in Turkey. He escaped from a prisoner-of-war camp at Brusa (Bursa) with the aid of a French woman, Mlle Elizabeth Chaki, and went into hiding in Istanbul. After helping draft peace proposals he eventually escaped but was too late to be involved in the signing of the armistice held on HMS Liverpool.

Lowell Thomas, in his book With Lawrence in Arabia (1924), wrote "But months later, after having survived smallpox and all the other luxuries of Turkish prison life, the colonel escaped from his cell in Constantinople through the aid of a beautiful Syrian girl, who then concealed him in her home." (pg 304). "Then, as any born hero of melodrama would expect to do as the climax to his romantic career, he married the beautiful Syrian girl who had helped him escape---and we hope lived happily ever after." (pg 305)

== Marriage and later life ==
Newcombe married Elsie Chaki in London in April 1919. Their son, born in 1920, was christened Stewart Lawrence in recognition of his father's friendship with T. E. Lawrence who became the boy's godfather. Their daughter Diana Louie, born 1921, became Baroness Elles. Newcombe went to Malta in 1929 as Chief Engineer, retiring in 1932.

In 1935, Newcombe was one of the six pallbearers at Lawrence's funeral.

As noted in the memoirs of David Ben-Gurion, Israel's first Prime Minister, Newcombe was in December 1937 involved in an effort to start negotiations between the Zionist Movement and prominent Palestinian Arabs, aimed at trying to end the violent confrontations then engulfing Mandatory Palestine. The initiative failed due to irreconcilable differences over the key issue of Jewish immigration to Palestine.

Newcombe's medals were sold at auction in 1992 but were then revealed to have been stolen in 1955.
