= Shu-Fang Lai =

Professor of Victorian literature

Shu-Fang Lai (Chinese: 賴淑芳) is an academic and author who specialises in Victorian literature and periodicals, especially the work of Charles Dickens. She is a professor at National Sun Yat-Sen University in Taiwan.

From 2017 to 2019, she was a research fellow at the Institute for Advanced Studies in the Humanities at the University of Edinburgh where she researched Robert Chambers and his Edinburgh Journal.

== Works ==
=== Books ===
- The Land of Story-Books: Scottish Children’s Literature in the Long Nineteenth Century (2019)
- How We Became Posthuman： Virtual Bodies in Cybernetics, Literature, and Informatics (2018)
- Victorian Fancy (2013)
- Charles Reade, George Meredith and Harriet Martineau as Serial Writers of Once a Week (1859-1865) (2008)
