= Diana Elles, Baroness Elles =

British politician (MEP)

The Right Honourable The Baroness Elles
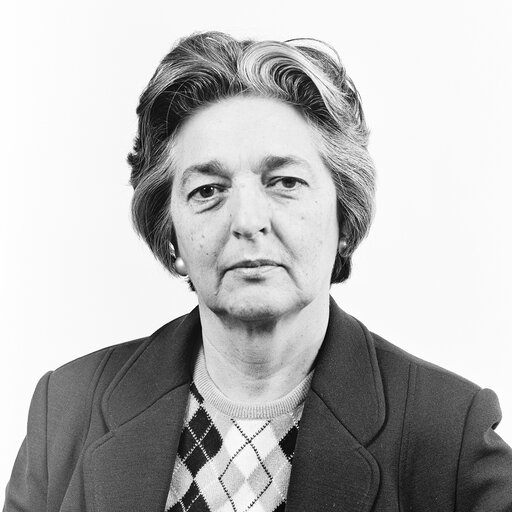

Member of the European Parliament for the Thames Valley
- In office 10 June 1979 – 15 June 1989
- Preceded by: District created
- Succeeded by: John Stevens

Member of the House of Lords
- Lord Temporal
- Life peerage 2 May 1972 – 17 October 2009

Personal details
- Born: 19 July 1921
- Died: 17 October 2009 (aged 88)
- Party: Conservative
- Spouse: Neil Patrick Moncrieff Elles
- Children: Elizabeth Rosamund (born 1947), James Elles (born 1949)
- Occupation: Barrister

Diana Louie Elles, Baroness Elles (née Newcombe; 19 July 1921 – 17 October 2009) was a British barrister and politician. She was a delegate to the European Parliament from 1979 to 1989 and a delegate to the United Nations General Assembly. Politician James Elles is her son.

== Early years ==
Born Diana Newcombe in Bedford, she was the daughter of Colonel Stewart Francis Newcombe and his wife Elisabeth Chaki, who he had met in his war captivity. Her father was a close friend of T. E. Lawrence, who was the godfather of her brother Stuart Lawrence Newcombe (born 1920). After education at private schools in London, Paris and Florence, she went to the University of London, where she graduated with a Bachelor of Arts in French and Italian in 1941. During the Second World War Elles served in the Women's Auxiliary Air Force, becoming a flight officer in 1944. Versed in mathematics she was attached to Bletchley Park and was part of a team of code-breakers. In 1944 she took a course in Japanese at Bletchley Park taught by Arthur Cooper for members of the RAF and WAAF.

== Career in England ==
Elles was called to the bar by Lincoln's Inn in 1956 and worked in the voluntary care committee in Kennington. She was director of the National Institute of Houseworkers, opening a training college in 1963. In July 1970, Elles became chairman of the British section of the European Union of Women and three years later of the organisation as a whole. In 1972, Edward Heath, at that time Prime Minister of the United Kingdom arranged for her a life peerage and on 2 May she was created Baroness Elles, of the City of Westminster. When Labour took office in 1974, she sat on the Opposition benches in the House of Lords and acted as Spokesperson for foreign and European affairs.

In 1977 Elles became a council member of the Royal Institute of International Affairs until 1986 and subsequently was governor of the University of Reading until 1996. She was trustee of the Industry and Parliament Trust from 1985 and in 1990 a trustee of the Caldecott Community that was founded as a London nursery in 1911 – latterly a residential (therapeutic) community for children in care. Elles was appointed an honorable bencher of Lincoln's Inn in 1993. After her retirement from politician, she spent her time supporting the British Institute of Florence.

== Foreign career ==
In 1972, Elles joined the British delegation to the United Nations General Assembly and after a year was added to the UN Sub-Commission for Prevention of Discrimination and Protection of Minorities. She was nominated UN Special Rapporteur on Human Rights in 1975. Four years later, she resigned her offices with the UN.

Edward Heath sent her to the European Parliament in 1973, where she headed the international office until 1978, when Elles had to make room for a Labour delegate. In the Parliament's first election in 1979, she won the Conservative seat for Thames Valley. Together with her son James, she was returned in 1984 for another five years. From 1982, she served as the Parliament's vice-president and two years later, stood unsuccessfully for the presidency. When in 1987, her term ended, she ran for the leadership of the European Democratic Group, however was defeated by Christopher Prout. Elles left the Parliament in 1989 and became a member of the Belgian law firm Van Bael and Bellis.

== Personal life ==
In 1945, she married Neil Patrick Moncrieff Elles; they had two children, Elizabeth Rosamund (born 1947) and James Edmund Moncrieff (born 1949). Her husband having predeceased her, Elles died on 17 October 2009, aged 88.

== Works ==
- The Housewife and The Common Market (1971)
- Procedural Aspects of Competition Law (1975)
- UN Human Rights of Non-Citizens (1984)
- Legal Issues of the Maastricht Treaty (1995)
- European and World Trade Law (1996)

European Parliament
New constituency	Member of the European Parliament for Thames Valley; 1979 – 1989	Succeeded by John Stevens
