= Thames Valley (European Parliament constituency) =

Former European Parliament constituency

- European Parliament constituency
- Boundary within South East England (1979-1984)
- Member state: United Kingdom
- Created: 1979
- Dissolved: 1999
- MEPs: 1

Prior to its uniform adoption of proportional representation in 1999, the United Kingdom used first-past-the-post for the European elections in England, Scotland and Wales. The European Parliament constituencies used under that system were smaller than the later regional constituencies and only had one Member of the European Parliament each. The constituency of Thames Valley was one of them.

Boundary within South East England and London (1984-1994)

Boundary within South East England and London (1994-1999)

== Boundaries ==
1979-1984: Beaconsfield; Chesham and Amersham; Eton and Slough; Spelthorne; Windsor and Maidenhead; Wokingham; Wycombe.

1984-1999: East Berkshire; Reading East; Reading West; Slough; Spelthorne; Windsor and Maidenhead; Wokingham.

== Members of the European Parliament ==
Elected	Member	Party
1979	Diana Elles	Conservative
1989	John Stevens	Conservative
1999	John Stevens	Pro-Euro Conservative
1999	Constituency abolished: see South East England	

== Election results ==
European Parliament election, 1979: Thames Valley
Party	Candidate	Votes	%	±%
Conservative	Diana Elles	110,788	63.1	
Labour	J. A. F. Ennals	39,865	22.7	
Liberal	M. P. Fogarty	24,877	14.2	
Majority		70,923	40.4	
Turnout		175,530	33.2	
Conservative win (new seat)				

European Parliament election, 1984: Thames Valley
Party	Candidate	Votes	%	±%
Conservative	Diana Elles	74,928	52.1	−11.0
Labour	Robert B. Bastin	36,123	25.1	+2.4
Liberal	Robert W. Bradnock	32,704	22.8	+8.6
Majority		38,805	27.0	
Turnout		143,755	27.7	
Conservative hold		Swing		

European Parliament election, 1989: Thames Valley
Party	Candidate	Votes	%	±%
Conservative	John Stevens	73,070	42.7	−9.4
Labour	Miss Hilary B. De Lyon	46,579	27.2	+2.1
Green	Peter Gordon	36,865	21.6	New
SLD	David B. Griffiths	14,603	8.5	−14.3
Majority		26,491	15.5	−11.5
Turnout		171,117	31.6	+3.9
Conservative hold		Swing		

European Parliament election, 1994: Thames Valley
Party	Candidate	Votes	%	±%
Conservative	John Stevens	70,485	37.3	−5.4
Labour	John Howarth	69,727	36.9	+9.7
Liberal Democrats	Nelson C. Bathurst	33,187	17.5	+9.0
Green	Phil J. Unsworth	6,120	3.2	−18.4'"`UNIQ−−ref−0000001B−QINU`"'
Liberal	John S. Clark	5,381	2.8	New
Monster Raving Loony	Peter T. Owen	2,859	1.5	New
Natural Law	Mike R. S. Grenville	1,453	0.8	New
Majority		758	0.4	−15.1
Turnout		189,212	34.8	+3.2
Conservative hold		Swing		
