= Rejoin EU =

Political party in the United Kingdom

The Rejoin EU Party
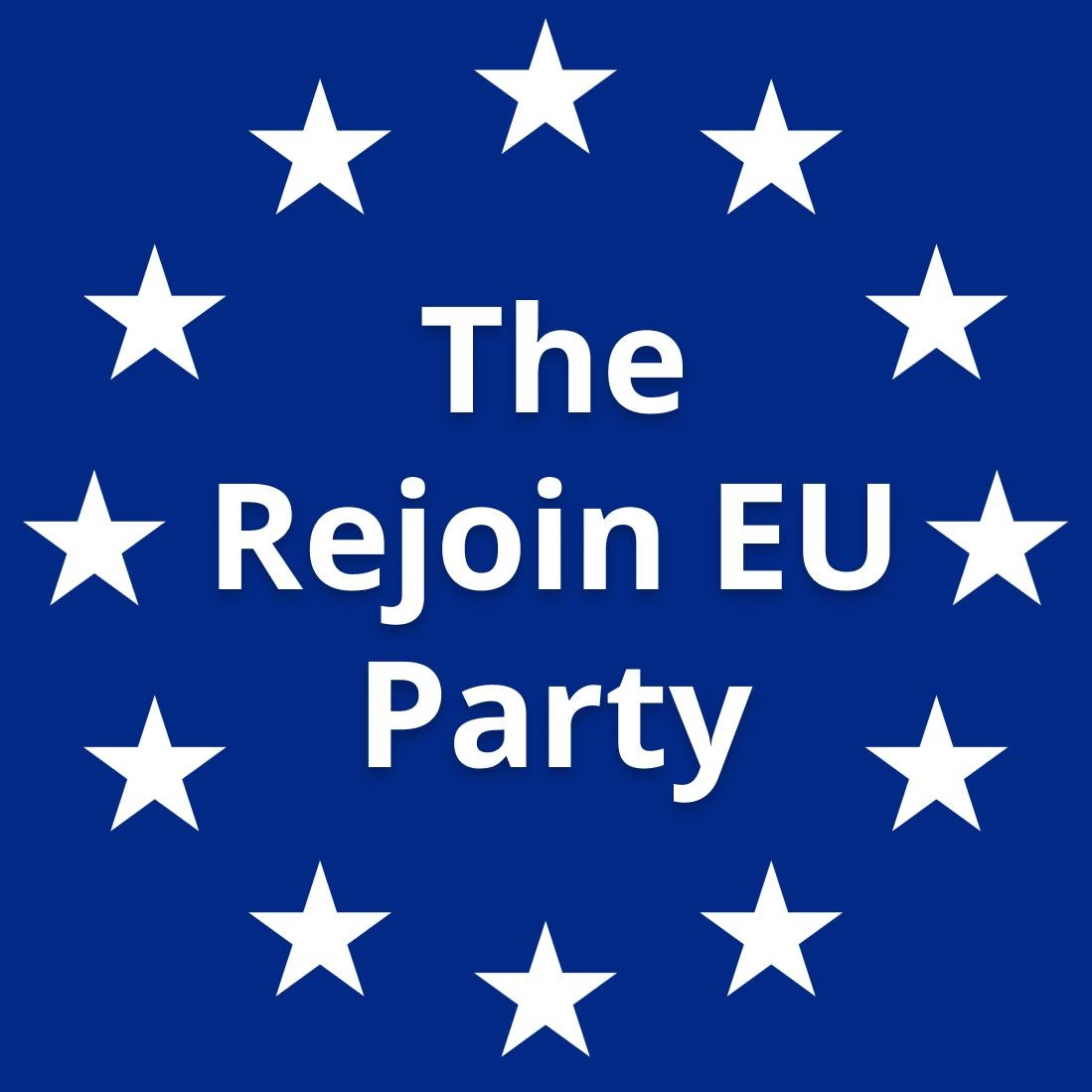
- Leader: TBD
- Deputy Leader: John Stevens
- Chairman: Brendan Donnelly
- Founded: February 17, 2020; 6 years ago
- Headquarters: 86-90 Paul Street; London; EC2A 4NE
- Ideology: Pro-Europeanism; Anti-Brexit
- Political position: Single-issue
- Colours: Blue

Website
- therejoineuparty.com

The Rejoin EU Party (known simply as Rejoin EU) is a minor pro-European, single-issue political party in the United Kingdom, established in February 2020 by Brendan Donnelly and John Stevens, two former members of the European Parliament (MEPs). The party was founded shortly after Brexit took place on 31 January 2020, and campaigns for the re-accession of the UK to the European Union.

== History ==
=== Background and ideology ===
Rejoin EU was registered in February 2020, shortly after the withdrawal of the United Kingdom from the European Union. It was founded by anti-Brexit campaigners including Brendan Donnelly and John Stevens, two former Conservative MEPs who led the Pro-Euro Conservative Party from 1991 to 2001.

Rejoin EU positions itself as a pro-EU alternative to the "cautious, ineffective or, in some cases, downright hostile policies on Europe held by other major parties". It argues that re-joining the European Union would give the UK defence and security benefits, citing the Common Security and Defence Policy.

Donnelly has said the party follows a parallel strategy to UKIP, by contesting elections, especially under the first-past-the-post system, which could put pressure on the main parties to adopt more pro-European policies.

=== Establishment ===
Richard Hewison, stood for the party at the 2021 London mayoral election, placing eight with 28,012 votes (1.1%). Later that year, the party also stood candidates at the Chesham and Amersham, Batley and Spen, Old Bexley and Sidcup and North Shropshire by-elections, each time receiving less than 0.7% of the vote.

The party gained its first and only elected office in 2022, when the party chairman Andrew Smith became a parish councillor in Oxfordshire. In December 2022, the party stood at both the City of Chester and Stretford and Urmston by-elections, achieving 1.0% and 1.3%, respectively.

Hewison was also the party's candidate at the 2023 Uxbridge and South Ruislip by-election, during which he criticised the Labour Party for its stance on Brexit.

Volt UK endorsed the party during the 2024 London Assembly election, with Hewison saying that Rejoin EU would not contest the mayoral election that year, as incumbent mayor Sadiq Khan had made "strong pro-EU comments".

Rejoin EU fielded 26 candidates, mainly across London, at the 2024 general election, including Brendan Donnelly who stood in Finchley and Golders Green. The party received 9,245 votes (0.03%), with none of its candidates holding their deposits.

In March 2025, Donnelly told the party, at its first annual conference, that it would stand at the Runcorn and Helsby by-election. The party selected John Stevens, who came tenth with 129 votes (0.4%). On 23 May 2026, Rejoin EU announced Peter Ward as their candidate for the 2026 Makerfield by-election.

John Stevens stood for the party at the 2026 Clacton by-election, targeting the 'anti-Brexit vote'. He came third with 492 votes (1.4%), the highest ever placement for Rejoin EU. The Guardian wrote that Stevens was running a "highly professional, constituency-wide campaign".

Richard Hewison stood down as the party leader on the 22 August 2026.

== Electoral performance ==
=== House of Commons ===
Rejoin EU 2024 general election results
Constituency	Candidate	Votes	%
Battersea	Georgina Burford-Connole	401	0.9
Bury St Edmunds and Stowmarket	Richard Baker-Howard	350	0.7
Chipping Barnet	Richard Hewison	379	0.7
Cities of London and Westminster	Liz Burford	352	0.9
Ealing Southall	Peter Ward	475	1.0
Fareham and Waterlooville	Edward Dean	210	0.4
Finchley and Golders Green	Brendan Donnelly	486	1.0
Hammersmith and Chiswick	Bill Colegrave	821	1.8
Hampstead and Highgate	Christie Elan-Kane	532	1.1
Hendon	Ben Rend	233	0.6
Kensington and Bayswater	John Stevens	486	1.2
Leyton and Wanstead	Simon Mark Bezer	244	0.6
Melton and Syston	Matt Shouler	288	0.6
Old Bexley and Sidcup	Laurent Williams	251	0.5
Oxford East	Andrew Smith	425	1.1
Peckham	Alex Kerr	285	0.7
Pendle and Clitheroe	Christopher Thompson	109	0.4
Preston	Joseph O'Meachair	216	0.5
Putney	Felix Burford-Connole	289	0.7
Rutland and Stamford	Joanna Burrows	409	0.8
Sevenoaks	Elwyn Jones	298	0.6
Sheffield Hallam	Sam Chapman	409	0.8
South West Hertfordshire	Victor Silkin	232	0.5
Stretford and Urmston	Jim Newell	308	0.7
Tooting	Jas Alduk	370	0.7
Tottenham	Andrew Miles	306	0.8

=== Parliamentary by-elections ===
Rejoin EU Parliamentary by-election results
Election	Candidate	Votes	%	Position
2021 Chesham and Amersham by-election	Brendan Donnelly	101	0.3	8th
2021 Batley and Spen by-election	Andrew Smith	75	0.2	13th
2021 Old Bexley and Sidcup by-election	Richard Hewison	151	0.7	8th
2021 North Shropshire by-election	Boris Been-Bunged	58	0.2	11th
2022 City of Chester by-election	Richard Hewison	277	1.0	6th
2022 Stretford and Urmston by-election	Jim Newell	237	1.3	6th
2023 Uxbridge and South Ruislip by-election	Richard Hewison	105	0.3	10th
2025 Runcorn and Helsby by-election	John Stevens	129	0.4	10th
2026 Gorton and Denton by-election	Joseph O'Meachair	98	0.3	8th
2026 Makerfield by-election	Peter Mark Ward	35	0.1	10th
2026 Clacton by-election	John Stevens	492	1.4	3rd

=== London mayoral elections ===
Results as published by London Elects.

Year	Candidate	Votes	%	±
2021	Richard Hewison	28,012	1.1	New

=== London Assembly ===
Results as published by London Elects.

Year	Election	Votes	%	Seats	+/-
2021	London-wide list	49,389	1.9%	0 / 25	New
2024	London-wide list	62,528	2.5%	0 / 25	▲0.6%

=== Local elections ===
The party had 15 candidates across 15 wards at the 2026 local elections, none of whom where elected.
