= Jo Shaw =

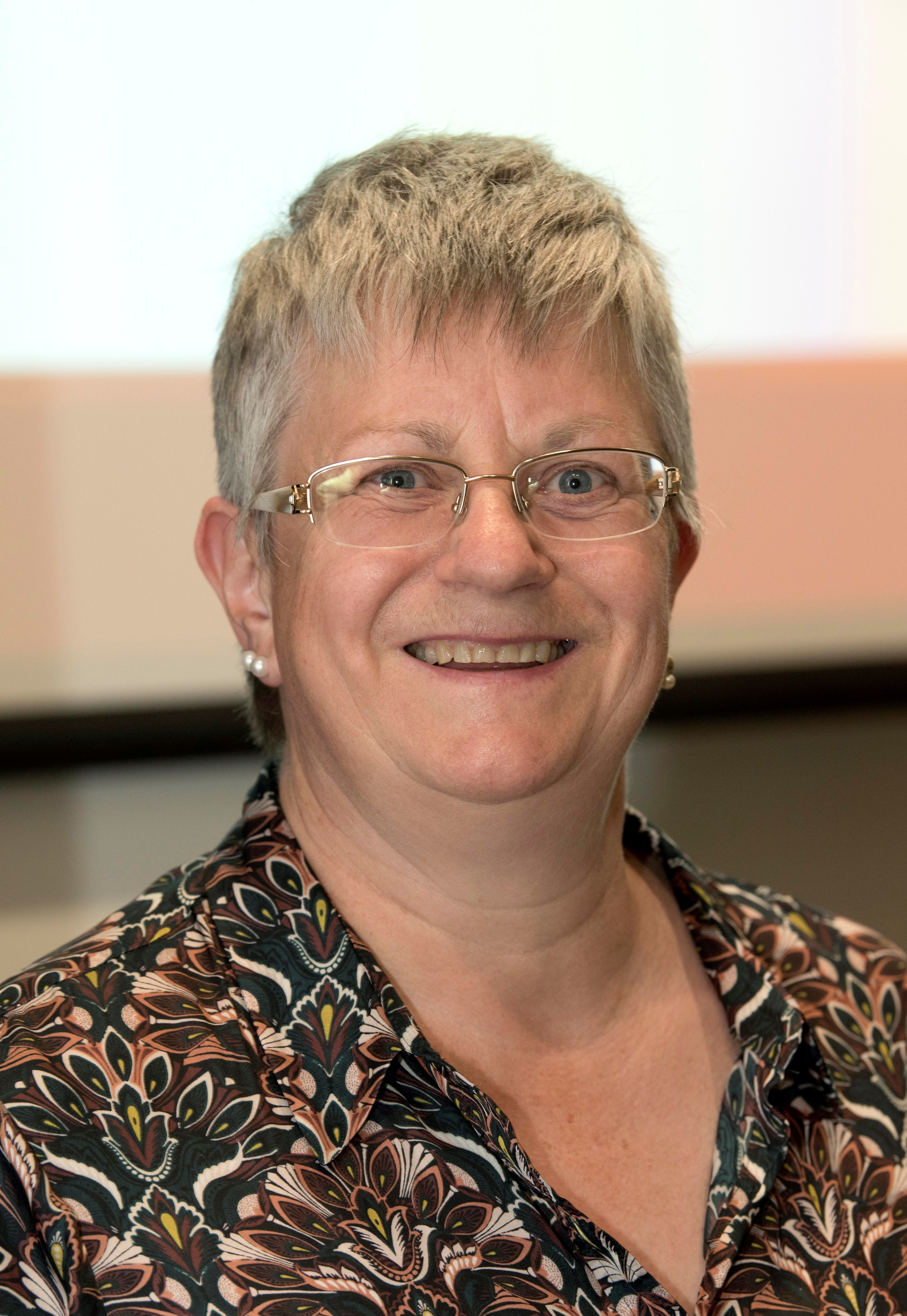
- Born: Josephine Shaw

Academic background
- Education: Trinity College, Cambridge and Université libre de Bruxelles

Academic work
- Discipline: European Union legal scholar
- Sub-discipline: Citizenship and constitutionalism
- Institutions: University of Edinburgh, University of Manchester, University of Leeds, Keele University, University of Exeter
- Website: https://www.law.ed.ac.uk/people/joshaw

Jo Shaw FRSE is a British academic specialising in EU law, citizenship and constitutionalism. She holds the Salvesen Chair of European Institutions, one of the established chairs at the University of Edinburgh, and was director of the Institute for Advanced Studies in the Humanities 2014-17. Between 2009 and 2014 she was Dean of research of the College of Humanities and Social Science of the University of Edinburgh.

== Studies and academic career ==
Jo Shaw completed her undergraduate studies at Trinity College, Cambridge where she studied Modern Languages in Part 1 of Tripos, followed by Law in Part 1B and Part 2. She was awarded a scholarship by the Wiener-Anspach Foundation to study at the Institut des Etudes Europennes at the Université Libre de Bruxelles, where she completed the Licence spéciale en droit européen. She also gained an LLD from the University of Edinburgh in 2008 and was awarded an Honorary LLD from Helsinki University in 2023.

Jo Shaw started her academic career at University College London and worked subsequently at the University of Exeter, Keele University and the University of Leeds. Before moving to Edinburgh she was Professor of European Law at the University of Manchester. She was a Fulbright Visitor and Visiting Professor at Harvard Law School in 1998 and in 2017-2018 she was a EURIAS fellow at the Collegium for Advanced Studies at Helsinki University.

Jo Shaw is a fellow of the Academy of Social Sciences and the Royal Society of Edinburgh. She is listed on the web site AcademiaNet, which profiles world-leading women academics. In 2015 the Chancellor of the University of Edinburgh, the Princess Royal, conferred the Chancellor's Award for Research on Professor Shaw in recognition of her outstanding contributions to research. Since 2001, she has been a senior research fellow at The Federal Trust. She is co-director of the GlobalCIT Observatory at the European University Institute. She was chair of the University Association for Contemporary European Studies (UACES) between 2003 and 2006. In 2024 she was elected General Secretary of the Royal Society of Edinburgh (2025-2029).

== Research ==
Jo Shaw’s research focuses on citizenship in the broader European and constitutional context and is broadly socio-legal in approach. Her research has been supported by funding from the European Research Council (Advanced Investigator Award to study citizenship in the former Yugoslavia (CITSEE)), the Leverhulme Trust, the Economic and Social Research Council, the Arts and Humanities Research Council, the British Academy and the Nuffield Foundation. She was earlier the author of a widely used textbook on European Union law and of a cases, materials and commentary book, with Sally Wheeler, on Contract Law.

== Selected bibliography ==
=== Books ===
- Shaw, Jo (2020). The People in Question: Citizens and Constitutions in Uncertain Times. Bristol University Press. ISBN 978-1529210422.
- Shaw, Jo (2007). The transformation of citizenship in the European Union. Cambridge: Cambridge University Press. ISBN 9780521677943.
- Shaw, Jo; Hunt, Jo; Wallace, Chloe (2007). Economic and social law of the European Union. Basingstoke: Palgrave MacMillan. ISBN 9780333637586.
- Shaw, Jo (2000). Law of the European Union. Basingstoke: Palgrave MacMillan. ISBN 9780333924914. Archived from the original on 13 August 2016.
- Shaw, Jo (1994). Contract Law: Cases, Materials and Commentary. Clarendon Press. ISBN 0198762941.
