= Sandro Jung =

Literary scholar

- Born: 1976
- Citizenship: German
- Education: University of Wales Lampeter (PhD)
- Scientific career
- Fields: literature, visual studies
- Institutions: Fudan University, Shanghai University of Finance and Economics, Hangzhou Normal University
- Thesis: The poetic fragment in the long eighteenth century (2004)

Sandro Jung (born 1976) is a literary scholar and Fudan Distinguished Professor of English and Comparative Literature and Director of the university-level Foreign Languages and Literature Institute at Fudan University. Before joining Fudan University, he served as Distinguished Professor and Head of English Literature at the Shanghai University of Finance and Economics, where he also directed the Centre for the Study of Text and Print Culture. In addition to his position at Fudan University, he also serves as Jack Ma Distinguished Professor at Hangzhou Normal University, Distinguished Professor at Hexi University, and Advisory Professor at the Shanghai International Studies University. Jung was the Founding Director of the Centre for the Study of Text and Print Culture at Ghent University. For the past 13 years, he has been the editor-in-chief of ANQ: A Quarterly Journal of Short Articles, Notes and Reviews.

Jung has been the recipient of numerous short- and long-term fellowships, including at the Houghton Library, Harvard University, where he was Eleanor M. Garvey Fellow in Printing and Graphic Arts and at Princeton University Library, where he was based in the Graphic Arts Department. In 2015, Jung was awarded a Marie Curie long-term fellowship as part of the EURIAS Junior Fellowship scheme, as part of which he researched the marketing of eighteenth- and nineteenth-century Scottish literature at the University of Edinburgh's Institute of Advanced Studies. In 2016, the Alexander von Humboldt Foundation awarded Jung a Senior Fellowship, which enabled him to undertake a major project on book illustration at the Herzog August Bibliothek Wolfenbüttel, as part of which he also organized a major exhibition at the library. And in 2018, he was awarded a Marie Curie long-term fellowship as part of the EURIAS Senior Fellowship scheme, during which he was based at the Freiburg Institute of Advanced Studies and researched a project on the transnational fortunes of Robinson Crusoe.

Jung is well-known for his publications on eighteenth-century English poetry. He is especially interested in lyric forms of poetry such as the ode and the pastoral, and he has extensively researched the (Georgic) long poem, publishing major studies of James Thomson's magnum opus, The Seasons. While genre-critical and genre-historical work characterized his publications up to 2012, he has since adopted interdisciplinary approaches, especially those involving the study of text-image relationships, to recover and chart the reception and reading history of literary works. He is considered a leading authority in the field of illustration studies.

== Books ==
- Transnational Crusoe, Illustration and Reading History, 1719-1722, Cambridge University Press, 2025
- Eighteenth-Century Illustration and Literary Material Culture, Cambridge University Press, 2023
- Kleine artige Kupfer: Buchillustration im 18. Jahrhundert, Harrassowitz, 2018
- The Publishing and Marketing of Illustrated Literature in Scotland, 1760-1825, Lehigh University Press, 2017
- Thomson’s ‘The Seasons’, Print Culture, and Visual Interpretation, 1730-1842, Lehigh University Press, 2015
- The Fragmentary Poetic: Eighteenth-Century Uses of an Experimental Mode, Lehigh University Press, 2009
- David Mallet, Anglo-Scot: Poetry, Patronage and Politics in the Age of Union, University of Delaware Press, 2008
