= Susan Manning (Scottish academic) =

Susan Manning FRSE FRSA
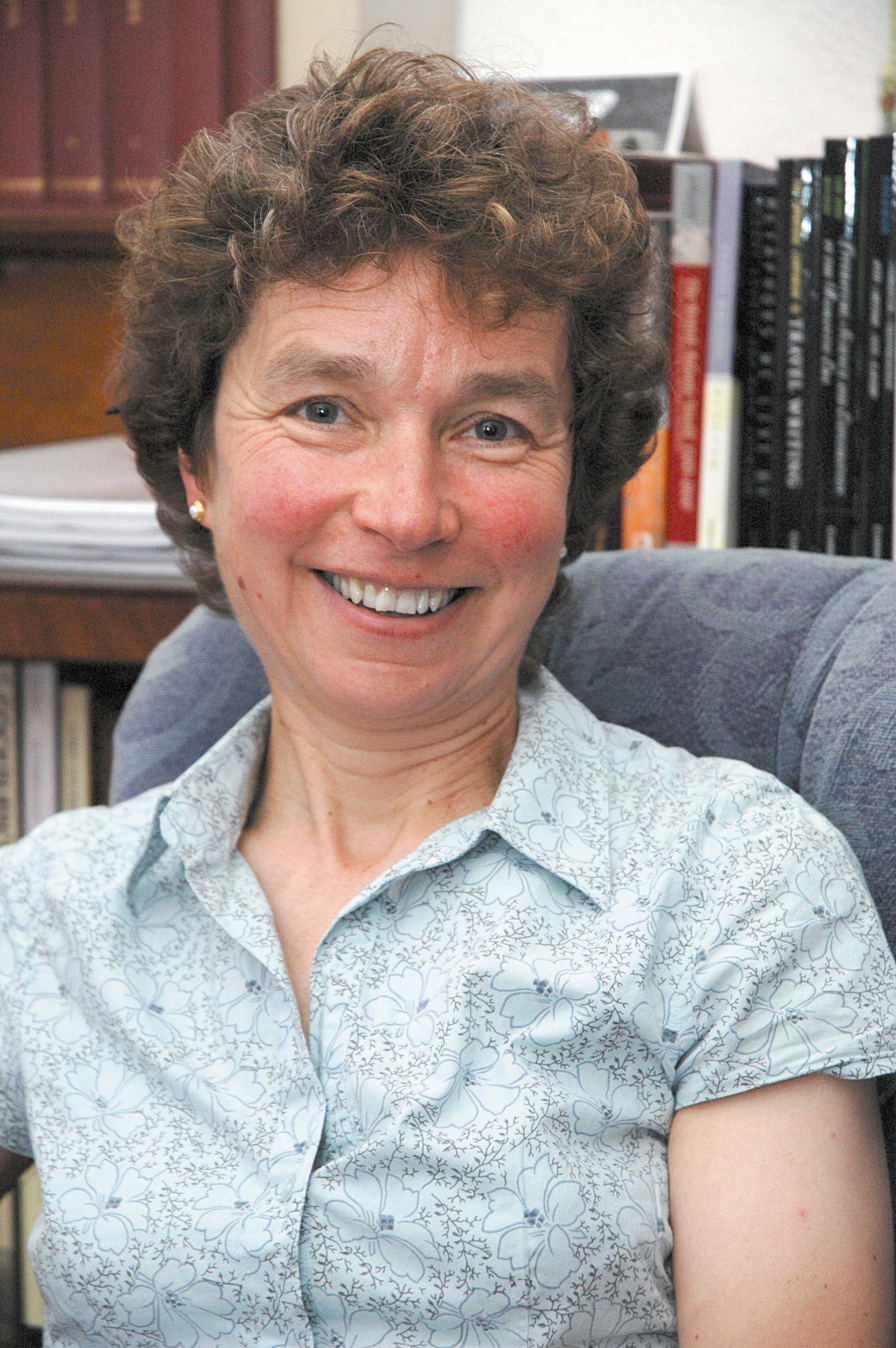
- Manning in her office in IASH, University of Edinburgh
- Born: Susan Valentine; 24 December 1953; Glasgow, Scotland
- Died: 15 January 2013 (aged 59); Edinburgh, Scotland
- Occupations: Professor of English Literature, University of Edinburgh; Director of the Institute for Advanced Studies in the Humanities, University of Edinburgh
- Known for: work on Scottish Enlightenment, Character and Emotions

Academic background
- Education: Newnham College, Cambridge; University of Virginia

Academic work
- Discipline: English literature, Scottish Studies
- Institutions: Newnham College; University of Edinburgh

Susan Manning FRSE FRSA (24 December 1953 – 15 January 2013) was a Scottish academic specialising in Scottish studies and English literature. Before her death in 2013 at the age of 59, she was the Grierson Professor in English literature at the University of Edinburgh and the Director of the Institute for Advanced Studies in the Humanities (IASH) at the University of Edinburgh. Prof. Manning's work on Scottish Enlightenment and transatlantic literature led to international acclaim. She was a Fellow of the Royal Society of Edinburgh and the Royal Society of Arts, Manufacturers and Commerce, Edinburgh.

== Education ==
Manning was born in Glasgow to Honora, a graduate of philosophy, and James Valentine, a physicist. When her family moved to Abingdon, Oxford in 1962 she attended Dunmore Primary where she met Jill Hanna. They became good friends and intellectual rivals, as Jill described in her tribute to Manning in 2013, "[W]e were rivals from the start, although the rivalry was simply a spur so that we both produced our individual best. Susan did not need a rival as she was always competing with herself". She later attended John Mason High School in Abingdon.

She earned a BA degree from Newnham College, University of Cambridge, graduating in 1976. It was at Cambridge that she met her future husband, physicist Howard Manning and got married.

She undertook doctoral studies at the University of Virginia under the supervision of Professor David Levin, a literary scholar and the Commonwealth Professor of English at the University of Virginia. She was equally attracted towards studying Scottish and American literature and the overlap between the two. Her main mode of inquiry involved discovering similarities between Scottish and American literary style, subjects and preoccupations, distinguishing these from English literature. This quest took the shape of defining what provincialism meant and its relation to any 'Centre'.

== Professional contribution ==
It took Manning 10 years to complete her PhD, during which time she was bringing up a young family. She would often joke that it had taken three children Laura, Lindsay and Sophie to complete her PhD. She took up a research fellowship in the Newnham College in 1981 where she went on to become a lecturer in 1984.

Her interest in Scottish literature resulted in her first major publication, The Puritan-Provincial Vision: Scottish and American Literature in the Nineteenth Century, issued in 1990 by Cambridge University Press. In Cambridge, she created and taught the American literature course which became popular among students.
