= Referendum Party =

Former UK political party

- Leader: James Goldsmith
- Founded: 1994; 32 years ago
- Dissolved: 1997; 29 years ago
- Ideology: Euroscepticism
- Political position: Single-issue
- Colours: Pink

The Referendum Party was a Eurosceptic, single-issue political party that was active in the United Kingdom from 1994 to 1997. The party's sole objective was for a referendum to be held on the nature of the UK's membership of the European Union (EU). Specifically, it called for a referendum on whether the British electorate wanted to be part of a federal European state or to revert to being a sovereign nation that was part of a European free-trade bloc without wider political functions.

The Referendum Party was founded by the Anglo-French multi-millionaire businessman and politician James Goldsmith in November 1994. A Eurosceptic who had previously had close links to the UK's governing Conservative Party, he was also an elected Member of the European Parliament for the Movement for France party. He used his financial resources and contacts to promote the new venture, in which he was assisted by other former Conservatives. The party's structure was centralised and hierarchical, giving Goldsmith near-total control over its operations. Although not offering party membership, it claimed to have 160,000 registered "supporters", a number that was probably an exaggeration. The party gained a Member of Parliament (MP) for two weeks in 1997, when George Gardiner, the MP for Reigate, defected to it from the Conservatives shortly before that year's general election.

In the build-up to the May 1997 general election, the Referendum Party spent more on press advertising than either the incumbent Conservatives or their main rival, the Labour Party. It stood candidates in 547 of the 659 constituencies, more than any minor party had ever fielded in a UK election. Ultimately the party gained 811,827 votes, representing 2.6% of the national total; it failed to win any seats in the House of Commons. Support was strongest in southern and eastern England, and weakest in inner London, northern England, and Scotland. Following the election, psephologists argued that the impact of the Referendum Party deprived Conservative candidates of victory in somewhere between four and sixteen parliamentary seats. In the months following the election, the party renamed itself the Referendum Movement. Goldsmith died in July 1997, and the party disbanded shortly afterward. Some of its supporters reformed as a Eurosceptic pressure group called the Democracy Movement while many others joined Eurosceptic political parties like the UK Independence Party and the Democratic Party.

== Formation ==
=== Background and ideology ===
The European Union as it existed in 1995, a year after the Referendum Party's formation

The United Kingdom joined the European Communities (EC) in 1973. Following the Maastricht Treaty in 1993 the EC became the European Union.The UK's ratification of the treaty in 1992, followed by its passing of the European Communities (Finance) Act in 1994–95, generated much controversy and infighting within the UK's Conservative Party, which was then in government under Prime Minister John Major. This caused considerable damage to Major's administration, which was increasingly unpopular among the British population. Various British newspapers, among them The Sun, The Daily Telegraph and The Times, had adopted a consistently Eurosceptic position. Opinion polls suggested growing opposition to aspects of the EU in the UK. More widely, the acceleration of the EU's integration process had resulted in the growth of Eurosceptic parties across many of its member states.

The Anglo-French businessman James Goldsmith announced the formation of the Referendum Party on 27 November 1994. Goldsmith had once been a strong supporter of the EC but had grown disenchanted with it during the early 1990s, becoming particularly concerned that it was forming into a superstate governed by centralised institutions in Brussels. He opposed the Maastricht Treaty, believing that it resulted in increased German dominance in Europe. As an economic protectionist, he was also critical of the EU's signing of the General Agreement on Tariffs and Trade, believing that global free trade would damage both the EU's economy and his own business interests.

Goldsmith had prior political experience, having been elected as a Member of the European Parliament (MEP) in France as part of the Eurosceptic Movement for France coalition in June 1994. Although his father had been a Member of Parliament representing Britain's Conservative Party, and he had personally had a close relationship to the party when it was led by Margaret Thatcher, Goldsmith wanted to launch his campaign independently of the Conservatives, hoping that it could draw on cross-party concerns about the direction of the EU. At the time of the party's formation, Goldsmith had an estimated personal wealth of £800 million, and promised to put £20 million into the party. He pledged to spend at least £10 million on campaigning for the next general election, to ensure that his party was funded to the same extent as the country's larger political parties. Goldsmith's intervention in British politics has been compared with that of the multi-millionaires Ross Perot in the United States and Silvio Berlusconi in Italy.

"Let me make just one promise, just one vow. We the rabble army, we in the Referendum Party, we will strive with all our strength to obtain for the people of these islands the right to decide whether or not Britain should remain a nation."

— James Goldsmith, 1994

According to the political scientists Matthew Goodwin and Robert Ford, the Referendum Party was "a classic single-issue party". Similarly, the political scientists Neil Carter, Mark Evans, Keith Alderman, and Simon Gorham described it as a "single-issue movement" that had attributes of both a political party and a pressure group. While it took part in elections, it focused on a single issue and stated that if it got Members of Parliament (MP) elected their sole aim would be to secure a referendum. It also claimed that on achieving its main aim, the party would disband, unlike most political parties; as Goldsmith put in his October 1995 "Statement of Aims": "This is a single-issue biodegradable party which will be dissolved once we have achieved our aim."

The referendum question which the party proposed was announced on 28 November 1996: "Do you want the United Kingdom to be part of a federal Europe or do you want the United Kingdom to return to an association of sovereign nations that are part of a common trading market?" The political scientists David Butler and Dennis Kavanagh noted that this question was often mocked for its "unrealistic ambiguity", and some journalists referred to Goldsmith's venture as the "Referendum Only Party". Goldsmith did not position the party as explicitly opposed to the EU, instead stating that it was "wholly agnostic" about EU membership and just wanted to secure a referendum on the issue. The wording of the party's main question led one group of political scientists to note that it "clearly revealed Goldsmith's Eurosceptic colours" and that the wider pronouncements of the party became increasingly Eurosceptic as time went on.

=== Establishment and growth ===
In its first year, the Referendum Party had little established organisation and largely remained a concept with limited concrete presence. Goldsmith's finances had allowed its appearance to be accompanied with mass publicity but it lacked the standard machinery of a political party, such as a mass membership or politically experienced personnel. To counter this problem, Goldsmith sought to create a sophisticated administrative centre and to secure the expertise to carry out a political campaign, establishing his headquarters in London. By October 1995, the party had established a hierarchical structure consisting of three tiers: the centre, region and constituency. Operating the centre was Goldsmith and a cabinet whose membership included Lord McAlpine, who was a former treasurer of the Conservative Party, and two former members of the Conservative Central Office staff. The centre had around 50 staff, who relayed Goldsmith's instructions through to the ten regional co-ordinators, who in turn transmitted them to the prospective candidates in the constituencies. This top-down and undemocratic structure concentrated decision making with Goldsmith and the centre and provided little autonomy for the regions and constituencies, although this was deemed necessary to ensure efficiency in its campaign.

Rather than having members who paid a joining fee, the Referendum Party had "supporters" who could voluntarily donate money if they wished. By February 1997, the party claimed that it had 160,000 registered supporters, although some of these individuals had only requested information about it and had not actively registered as "supporters". The party issued a newspaper, News from the Referendum Party, to attract wider attention to its aims and broaden its support. One issue, published in February 1996, was delivered to 24 million households at an estimated cost of £2 million.

The party also sought to attract the support of prominent figures from business, the arts, and academia, inviting them to its major events. In October 1996, it held a national conference in Brighton, in which forty speakers addressed an audience of 5,000. Among the speakers were the actor Edward Fox, the ecologist David Bellamy, the politician George Thomas, and the zookeeper John Aspinall. The conference had been staged largely to impress the media, at a cost of £750,000, although unsympathetic media outlets were reportedly banned from attending. By the time of the conference, the party was increasingly reflecting its Eurosceptic intentions, particularly with the use of slogans like "No Surrender to Brussels".

Early supporters fell largely into three types: committed Eurosceptics, disaffected Conservatives, and those who—though not necessarily being Eurosceptic—strongly believed that the British population deserved a referendum on EU membership. At the time the new party was largely seen as a threat to the governing Conservative Party, which was experiencing high levels of mid-term unpopularity. In September 1995, the party began recruiting candidates to contest the next general election. Goldsmith was also able to obtain celebrity endorsements. Despite Goldsmith's longstanding criticism of the mainstream media—he had previously stated that "reporting in England is a load of filth"—the party used its finances to promote its message in the media. It hired Ian Beaumont, who had formerly been the press officer to Thatcher's government, to work for it. The party paid for many full-page and some double-page advertisement in the UK's national newspapers, as well as two cinema advertisements. This generated criticism from those who accused it of "cheque-book politics" in the manner of Perot in the US. This financial backing and infrastructure contrasted with that of another single-issue Eurosceptic Party, the UK Independence Party (UKIP), which was operating with little finances and a skeleton organisation at the time.

Although the party had faced criticism and mockery, it gained much media exposure. Two months before the 1997 election, the party gained an MP in the House of Commons when George Gardiner, the Conservative MP for Reigate, switched allegiance to the Referendum Party after his local Conservative branch deselected him due to critical comments that he had made about Major.

== 1997 general election ==
The Referendum Party contested the 1997 general election. This image depicts the results by constituency: blue for a Conservative victory, red for Labour, gold for the Liberal Democrats, green for Plaid Cymru, and yellow for the Scottish National Party. The Referendum Party failed to secure any seats. In Northern Ireland, where it did not stand, domestic parties took all of the seats.

By the time of the 1997 general election, polls suggested that Eurosceptic sentiment was running high in the UK, and the question of the country's ongoing membership of the EU was a topic of regular discussion in the media. Much of this press coverage took a negative stance toward the EU, with mainstream newspapers like the Daily Mail, The Daily Telegraph and The Times promoting Eurosceptic sentiment. Such debates were influenced by the UK's recent signing of the Maastricht Treaty and the looming possibility that the country would adopt the euro currency.

=== Campaign ===
The Referendum Party did not contest any of the by-elections in 1996 and 1997. For the 1997 general election, it hurried its selection of candidates, who had only one interview—and no background checks or screening—before acceptance. The funding for each candidate's official campaign was supplied entirely by the party centre. Candidates were brought to a training day at a Manchester hotel in February 1997, where they were presented with several hours of speeches and given a handbook. Many felt that the event had been a public relations exercise rather than a concerted effort to train candidates.

Goldsmith's party was the biggest spender on press advertising in the 1997 campaign; it spent three times as much as the Conservatives and five times as much as Labour on press adverts. Its media profile greatly eclipsed that of UKIP. Goldsmith also used his financial resources to deliver a videocassette to five million UK households in March 1997. This was a novel strategy in British politics, and was conceived as a way of reaching the electorate while bypassing the mass media. The packaging of the videocassette did not specify that it was produced by the Referendum Party but rather carried several slogans: "The most important video you'll ever watch", "The story the politicians don't want you to hear", and "If you care about Britain, please pass this video on." The 12-minute film, presented by the former That's Life! presenter Gavin Campbell, warned of a coming "federal European super-state". In his analysis of the video, scholar David Hass argued that the film was deliberately designed to elicit fear in the viewer, something achieved through "eerie sound effects", the image of a blue stain spreading across a map of Europe, and slow-motion shots of German Chancellor Helmut Kohl striding towards the screen. In Hass' view, the film "manifestly reduced that complex issue of Europe to the lowest common denominator, and aimed to shock."

The BBC also permitted the party one five-minute party political broadcast because it was fielding over 50 candidates. The party insisted that it should have three such broadcasts, but the BBC claimed that this was disproportionate for a smaller, new party with no elected representation. The party took the issue to the High Court of Justice, which sided with the BBC. The broadcast featured Goldsmith talking directly to the camera, arguing for a referendum. Goldsmith implied that the BBC had a pro-EU agenda by referring to it as the "Brussels News Corporation", also claiming that there was a "conspiracy of silence" negatively impacting the coverage received by his party.

Goldsmith appeared in the Referendum Party's election broadcast, screened on the BBC.

In 1996, both the Conservative and Labour Parties committed to the idea that they would require a referendum on any proposed economic and monetary union with the EU; the Liberal Democrats had already committed to this idea. It is difficult to quantify what role the Referendum Party had on the adoption of this position. Goldsmith condemned the Conservatives' pledge as an "empty gesture". Concerned that they would lose votes to the Referendum Party, many in the Conservative Party were pressing Major to enter talks with Goldsmith, although the Prime Minister refused to engage in any formal dialogue. The electoral threat posed by Goldsmith's party was taken seriously among the Conservatives, with senior party figures like Major, Ken Clarke, Douglas Hurd, Brian Mawhinney and Michael Heseltine launching vitriolic and often personal criticisms of Goldsmith and his group. Hurd declared that "the government's policy must not be put at the mercy of millionaires who play with British politics as a hobby or as a boost to newspaper sales".

In the general election, candidates for the Referendum Party stood in 547 constituencies, the most that any minor party had ever fielded in a UK election. None of these candidates were in Northern Ireland. This was because Goldsmith had made an agreement with Northern Ireland's Ulster Unionist Party that he would not field any candidates against them if their one MEP joined his Europe of Nations grouping in the European Parliament, something that ensured that the grouping remained large enough to retain its Parliamentary funding. It also avoided putting up candidates in constituencies where the leading candidate (65 of them Conservatives, 26 Labour and 2 Liberal Democrats) was considered sympathetic to the Referendum Party's call for a referendum. Goldsmith appeared to acknowledge that it was unlikely to win any of the contested seats, stating that the party's success would be "judged solely by its total number of votes". The party officially launched its electoral campaign on 9 April 1997 at Newlyn in Cornwall, where Goldsmith sought to whip up Eurosceptic sentiment among fishermen who were angry with the restrictions imposed by EU fishing quotas.

=== Results ===
In the election, which took place on 1 May 1997, the Referendum Party polled 811,849 votes. This represented 2.6% of the national total, and the party averaged 3.1% in the seats which it contested. 42 of the party's candidates gained over 5% of the vote and thus saw the return of their deposits, which were then priced at £500 each; 505 deposits were lost. The party gained over 7% in four constituencies including John Aspinall in Folkestone and Hythe who received 8% of the vote. Much media attention was focused on the seat of Putney, where Goldsmith had stood as the Referendum candidate against incumbent Conservative MP David Mellor; Goldsmith secured 3.5% of the votes, losing his deposit, and the seat was won by the Labour candidate. Although it failed to win any seats, the party exhibited the strongest performance of a minor party in recent UK political history. Support had been strongest in the south and east of England, in particular in areas with high elderly populations and high rates of agricultural employment. Support for the party was considerably weaker in Inner London, Northern England, and Scotland; it secured only 1.1% of the Scottish vote. This may have reflected greater pro-EU sentiment in Scotland or a perception that the Referendum Party's Euroscepticism was a form of English nationalism rather than British nationalism. The Referendum Party had proved more electorally successful than its Eurosceptic rival, UKIP, which averaged 1.2% of the vote in the 194 constituencies that it contested.

"It would be wrong wholly to dismiss the impact of the Referendum Party—which may be seen in two ways. First, it helped promote Europe on the political agenda and added to the pressure which eventuated in the three major parties promising a referendum on the specific issue of EMU membership. Second, although the party had no effect on the outcome of the [1997 general] election, it did attract a respectable level of support and its presence contributed to the Conservative's dismal electoral performance."

— Carter, Evans, Alderman, and Gorham, 1998

The general election resulted in a victory for Tony Blair's Labour Party, which adopted a pro-EU stance. Labour's victory was considered a landslide, thus making the Referendum Party's role in the election fairly irrelevant. The Conservatives had gained only 30.7% of the vote, a drop from the 41.9% they had attained in 1992 and the lowest vote share that they had received since the establishment of modern British party politics in 1832. Their representation in the House of Commons fell by over half, from 343 to 165; their lowest representation in the House since 1906. The reasons for their electoral decline were many and the impact of the Referendum Party was not a major factor.

The Referendum Party nevertheless may have cost the Conservatives certain seats. Many Conservatives themselves believed that this was the case. As noted by Anthony Heath, Roger Jowell, Bridget Taylor, and Katarina Thomson from their analysis of polling data, "voters for the Referendum Party were certainly not a cross-section of the electorate. They were predominantly people who had voted Conservative (and, to a lesser extent, Liberal Democrat) in 1992. Hardly anyone who had voted Labour in 1992 supported Goldsmith's party." Their evidence indicated that just under two-thirds of those who voted for the Referendum Party in 1997 had voted for the Conservatives in 1992, although the analysis also suggested that many of these people were dissatisfied with the Conservative government and would not have voted for them even had the Referendum Party not existed. Heath et al noted that "voters for the Referendum Party were remarkably Eurosceptic but were unremarkable in most other respects. They show no sign of being right-wing on the economic issues of the left-right dimension and they were not consistently right-wing ideologues." Those who voted for the party held a diversity of ideological positions, the only shared factor being their Euroscepticism.

According to analysis by the political scientist John Curtice and psephologist Michael Steed, "only a handful of the Conservatives' losses of seats can be blamed on the intervention of the Referendum Party". Their estimate was that only four seats would have been Conservative without the Referendum Party standing. For this reason, Butler and Kavanagh stated that the Referendum Party "had only a limited effect on the Conservatives' fortunes". On employing aggregate constituency data, Ian McAllister and Donley T. Studlar disagreed, arguing that the Referendum Party had a greater impact on the Conservatives than previous research suggested. They argued that the Referendum Party cost the Conservatives an average of 3.4% of the vote. Their analysis further suggested that there were 16 seats where the involvement of the Referendum Party directly cost the Conservative candidate their victory, and a further three where it was a contributing factor to the Conservatives' failure.

== Dissolution and legacy ==
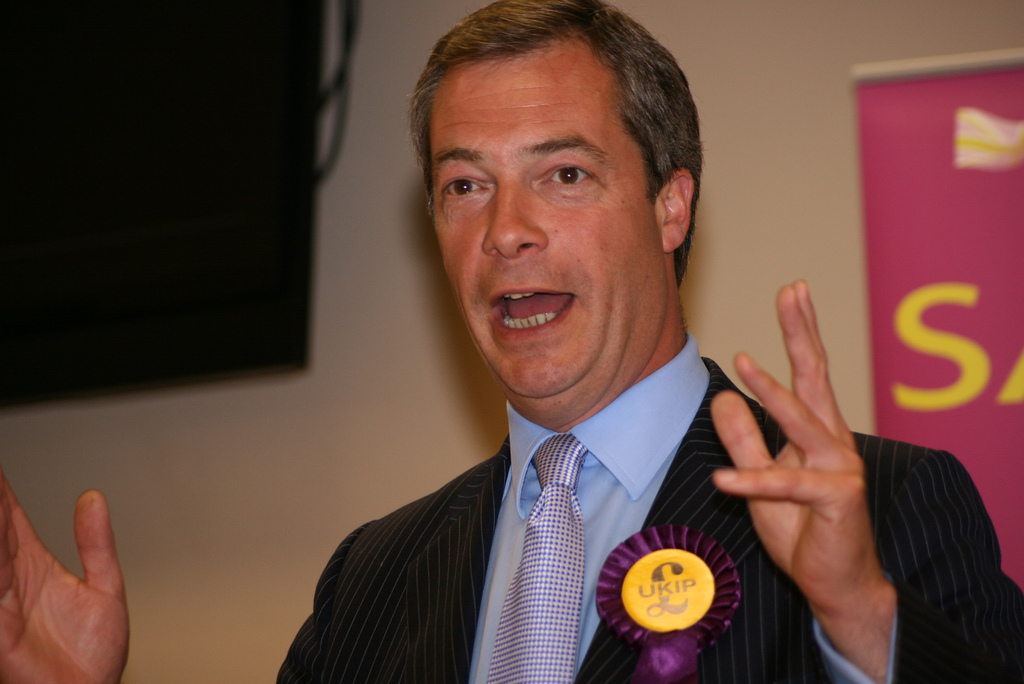
UKIP Chairman Nigel Farage recruited many former Referendum Party candidates to his own party.

Immediately after the election, the Referendum Party renamed itself the Referendum Movement. Goldsmith had been suffering from pancreatic cancer, and had been warned that competing in the election would shorten his life. He died in Benahavis, Spain, on 18 July 1997, and the party disbanded shortly afterwards. Some of its members transformed into the Democracy Movement, a pressure group closely associated with the former Conservative supporter and multi-millionaire businessman Paul Sykes. The Eurosceptic cause was weakened; with Blair's firmly pro-EU government in power, by 1998 the possibility of a referendum on the UK's membership of the EU was considered as distant as it had been in 1995.

Under the direction of UKIP's leader Michael Holmes, UKIP's chairman Nigel Farage began recruiting former Referendum Party members to their own group; according to Farage, around 160 of the Referendum Party's candidates joined UKIP. Among those who did so was Jeffrey Titford, who later became one of UKIP's first MEPs. Other former members of the Referendum Party joined the Democratic Party, a small Eurosceptic group founded in 1998. In the 1999 Kensington and Chelsea by-election, one candidate stood under the banner of the now-defunct "Referendum Party"; they came eleventh, with 57 votes. In the 2001 general election, much of the support that had previously gone to the Referendum Party went not to UKIP but to the Conservatives, whose leader William Hague had employed Eurosceptic rhetoric throughout his campaign.

Rupert Lowe, one of the Referendum Party's candidates in the 1997 general election, was elected as the Brexit Party's lead candidate for the West Midlands constituency in the 2019 European Parliament elections and was later elected MP for Reform UK for the constituency of Great Yarmouth. He went on to leave Reform and establish Restore Britain. James Glancy, another of the Brexit Party's MEPs, has compared the Brexit Party to the Referendum Party, being a "united and diverse group of people from different political backgrounds".
