= Hugo Charlton =

Lawyer and environmental activist

Hugo Charlton is a practising criminal barrister, international human rights lawyer, environmental activist, broadcaster and commentator. He was Chair of the Green Party of England and Wales from 2003 to 2005. Though he is no longer active in the Green Party, Charlton continues to speak on environmental and human rights issues, in particular on issues concerning climate change and its reduction through the prevention of deforestation, and on the right to self-determination for indigenous peoples. He is also an expert on the CRC Energy Efficiency Scheme and an advisor on clean technology solutions. He has worked for many years in support of the Kurdish community in the Middle East.

== Legal career ==
Charlton has been a practising criminal barrister since 1986. High-profile cases include R v Jones and Milling in which the illegality of the war in Iraq was considered by the House of Lords. In this case, the House of Lords conceded that the invasion of Iraq may have amounted to the international crime of aggression, but that it was not an offence under domestic UK law as all crimes must now be made by statute. In the case of R v Dudley JJ the legal basis for the collection of the Community Charge was found to be flawed.

=== Middle East human rights work ===
Since 2000, his work has involved the monitoring of women's rights and human rights in the Kurdish regions of Turkey, Syria and Iraq, and the monitoring of elections on behalf of the predecessor to Turkey's Peoples' Democratic Party (HDP). He is currently engaged in developing a program to provide psychosocial support for the survivors of the Yezidi genocide in Iraq.

Charlton is a founding member of the Campaign against Criminalising Communities which has been campaigning against the misuse of anti-terrorism legislation since 1999. He is also a member of the Kurdish Genocide Task Force (KGTF), an international group, endorsed and supported by the Kurdistan Regional Government (KRG), and a member of the Panel of Defence Lawyers for the Special Tribunal for Lebanon.

He became aware of human trafficking out of Yarl's Wood Immigration Removal Centre in 2000, and subsequently visited and wrote a report on the issue in post-conflict Balkans.

He is Chair of Widows for Peace through Democracy, the registered UK charity and umbrella organisation for partner widows’ associations and organisations in developing and conflict afflicted countries.

== Political career ==
Charlton joined the Green Party of England and Wales in the 1980s. He served as Regional Councillor (East Anglia) and as Chair of the Policy Committee. He was the Animal Rights Speaker and Law Officer of the Party for seven years. Charlton was the party's Home Affairs Speaker from 1998 until he resigned as Chair in 2005.

Charlton has been a candidate in both local and General Elections (Epsom & Ewell (1997), Kensington and Chelsea (1999 By Election), and Cities of London and Westminster (2001)). He was the candidate for Surrey in the European election. As Director of the Poll Tax Legal Group he was a leading member of the anti-poll tax campaign, and defended famous refuseniks such as Watt Tyler and Ken Livingstone. The argument he created, which provided the legal basis for the non-payment campaign, (namely that collection of the tax by computer could not be enforced in the Magistrates Court), was accepted by the Court of Appeal, led by Lord Nolan, and resulted in the need for new legislation. His writings include a contribution to the anthology A Permanent State of Terror, in which his essay, "Kafka through the looking glass", condemned the legal and political justification by the Court of Appeal for the detention without trial of alleged terrorist suspects. The Judicial Committee of the House of Lords, in an unprecedented ruling by nine Law Lords, has subsequently reversed the ruling by the Court of Appeal.

He has been a proponent of nonviolent direct action, and participated in many roads protests, including those at Twyford Down and the M11 link road.

He has campaigned against the export of live animals, and the keeping of dolphins in captivity in the UK. He has visited Northern Kurdistan on human rights monitoring trips, and in particular highlighted the mistreatment of women whilst in police or military custody. He has campaigned against the Ilisu dam project. Following a trip to the Balkans he instigated a Green Party campaign against the trafficking of women and was one of the first to draw attention to the issue and has campaigned of the behalf of the victims of trafficking.

His ongoing concerns include the dangers posed by nuclear pollution, and has defended anti-nuclear protestors. Together with Mark Thomas he conducted an inspection of Trident nuclear submarines at the naval base at Faslane until their "pedallo for peace" was turned back by armed fast boat patrols.

He has also argued that strategic nuclear weapons are illegal under international law and campaigns against nuclear proliferation. Liberty took his case of O'Halleran, concerning the use of speed cameras, to the European Court of Human Rights on the basis of an infringement of the right to silence.

== Personal life ==
Hugo Charlton graduated from the University of York in 1973 with a BA (Hons) in sociology and social psychology. He then travelled widely overseeing the export of whisky to the Far East, Latin America and the Caribbean before practising law. He served in the Territorial Army for seven years.

Charlton married Jane Sidnell, an antiques dealer, in Chelsea in 1994. They have two daughters, Lavinia and Bella.

Trade union offices
Preceded by Penny Kemp	Chair of the Green Party of England and Wales; 2003–2005	Succeeded by Richard Mallender
