= Federal Union =

Pro-European British political group

The Federal Union is a pro-European British political group launched in November 1938, to advocate a federal Europe as a post-war aim.

The founders of the organisation were Charles Kimber, Derek Rawnsley and Patrick Ransome. Other noted members of the Federal Union included Harold Wilson, Barbara Wootton, C. E. M. Joad, Stephen King-Hall and Philip Kerr, 11th Marquess of Lothian. In 1940 the group set up a Federal Union Research Institute (FURI), chaired by William Beveridge, to discuss the direction of post-war European integration. FURI attracted contributors from across the political spectrum, including F.A. Hayek, J. B. Priestley, H. N. Brailsford, Lionel Robbins and Arnold Toynbee.

In 1956, it argued for British participation in the European Economic Community. It continues to exist today, arguing for federalism for Europe and the world.

The organisation argues that federalism is the division of political power between levels of government to achieve the best combination of democracy and effectiveness, and does not necessarily involve the bureaucratic centralisation of common assumption.

The Federal Union believes that democracy and the rule of law should apply between states as well as within them. It is also the British section of the Union of European Federalists and of the World Federalist Movement/Institute for Global Policy.

== See also ==
- Federalism
- Federalisation of the European Union
- Federal Trust
