= John Stevens (British politician) =

British politician (born 1955)

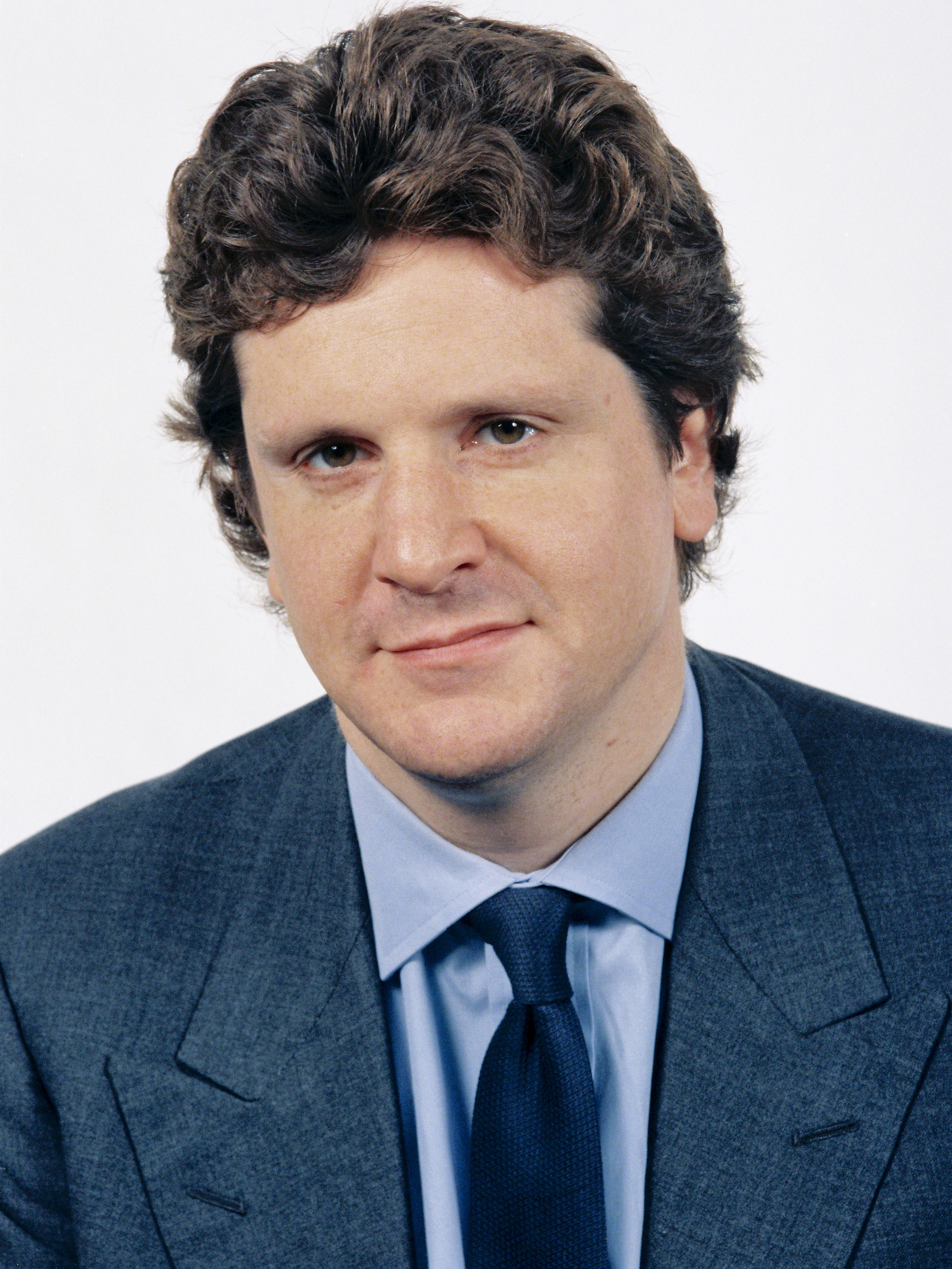
- Official portrait, 1994

Leader of the Pro-Euro Conservative Party
- In office 10 March 1999 – 10 December 2001
- Deputy: Brendan Donnelly
- Preceded by: Office established
- Succeeded by: Office abolished

Member of the European Parliament for the Thames Valley
- In office 15 June 1989 – 10 June 1999
- Preceded by: Diana Elles
- Succeeded by: Constituency abolished

Personal details
- Born: 23 May 1955 (age 71)
- Party: Rejoin EU (2021–present)
- Other political affiliations: Conservative (until 1999); Pro-Euro Conservative (1999–2001); Liberal Democrats (2001–2010); Independent (2010–2020)
- Education: Magdalen College, Oxford

John Christopher Courtenay Stevens (born 23 May 1955) is a British politician active in Rejoin EU, who founded and formerly led the Pro-Euro Conservative Party. A Conservative member of the European Parliament (MEP) from 1989 to 1999, he contested the Buckingham constituency in the 2010 general election as an independent, against Commons speaker John Bercow and came second with 10,331 votes (21.4%) compared to Bercow's 22,860 (47.3%).

== Background ==
Stevens was educated at Winchester, where he won the Boxing Cup, and at Magdalen College, Oxford, taking a third class honours degree in law. He then worked as a foreign exchange and bond trader for Morgan Grenfell.

He was the Conservative member of the European Parliament (MEP) for Thames Valley from 1989 to 1999, before leaving the party in protest over its increasingly Eurosceptic positioning. He then co-founded, along with Brendan Donnelly, the Pro-Euro Conservative Party (PECP) in that year. He contested the 1999 Kensington and Chelsea by-election for the PECP and came fourth.

The PECP was wound up in 2001 and Stevens joined the Liberal Democrats. He left the party in 2010 to stand in the 2010 general election against the Commons speaker, John Bercow, and the leader of the UK Independence Party, Nigel Farage, in Buckingham. He stood for the Rejoin EU party at the 2021 London Assembly election, and for Kensington and Bayswater in the 2024 general election. He was the candidate for the party in the 2025 Runcorn and Helsby by-election. As the Rejoin EU candidate in the 2026 Clacton by-election, standing against leader of Reform UK Nigel Farage, Stevens came in 3rd and received 1.4% of the vote (492 votes).

Party political offices
New political party	Leader of the Pro-Euro Conservative Party; 1999–2001	Party dissolved
European Parliament
Preceded by Baroness Elles	Member of the European Parliament for Thames Valley; 1989–1999	Constituency abolished
