= Lesley McAra =

Scottish legal scholar

Lesley McAra FRSE CBE
- Education: University of Edinburgh
- Known for: Research in criminology, poverty and social justice

Lesley McAra is Chair of Penology at the University of Edinburgh She is a fellow of the Royal Society of Edinburgh and was appointed a CBE in the New Year's Honours List 2018, for services to Criminology.

== Career ==
McAra grew up in Hull as an expat Scot, and returned to Edinburgh to study at University. McAra's areas of academic research include the sociology of punishment, the sociology of law and deviance, youth crime, juvenile justice, gender justice and comparative criminal justice. She worked first at the Scottish Office doing research evaluating social work criminal justice services. She joined the University of Edinburgh as lecturer in criminology in 1995 and has been Dean of the School of Law, a member of the Centre for Law and Society and the Global Justice Academy and Director of the Edinburgh Futures Institute. McAra is an associate at the Scottish Centre for Crime and Justice Research (SCCJR). From 2019 to 2020, she served as President of the European Society of Criminology.

She is co-director (with Professor Susan McVie) of the Edinburgh Study of Youth Transitions and Crime, a research programme funded by the Nuffield Foundation tracking the lives of young people in Scotland. It is a major longitudinal study of a single cohort of around 4,000 people who started secondary school in Edinburgh in the autumn of 1998 The research highlighted how policing impacts on young people and that the structures of the criminal justice system in Scotland punish the poor, preventing them from escaping hardship. The research project has continued to track changes over time.
