= The Federal Trust =

Research institute based in the United Kingdom

The Federal Trust for Education and Research is a research institute studying the interactions between regional, national, European and global levels of government. Founded in 1945 on the initiative of Sir William Beveridge, it has long made a powerful contribution to the study of federalism and federal systems. It has always had a particular interest in the European Union and Britain’s place in it.

The Federal Trust has no allegiance to any political party. It is registered as a charity for the purposes of education and research.

== People ==
The chairman of The Federal Trust is John Stevens.

=== Senior research fellows ===
- Dr Karine Lisbonne – Azais de Vergeron Dr Karine de Vergeron is associate director and head of Europe Programme at the Global Policy Institute. She has extensive experience in international relations and issues relating to European politics, culture and identity, and the relationship between Europe, China and India as well as the Belt and Road Initiative. She initiated several research projects on non-European views of Europe – Chinese and Indian Views of Europe – jointly with Chatham House in the United Kingdom and the Robert Schuman Foundation in France since 2006. She was the Federal Trust lead of the EU-India Think Tank Twinning project (2018–2020).
- Professor Colin Talbot is emeritus professor of government at the University of Manchester and a research affiliate at the University of Cambridge. He has extensive experience of researching, advising, consulting and teaching about Government and public services at all levels. His main research work has been on strategies, structures and performance of the institutions of government and he has published several books and numerous articles for both academic and more popular audiences. He led the Federal Trust's work on Federal Futures in the UK and Intergovernmental relations in the UK.
- Professor Jo Shaw (BA Cantab, LenDr Brussels, FRSA) has been professor of European law and Jean Monnet Chair at the University of Manchester since September 2001. She directed the trust's study on Constitutionalism, Federalism and the Reform of the European Union.
- Professor Stanley Henig is a former MP and leader of Lancaster City Council. Until 1999 he was secretary of the Labour Group on the Local Government Association. He is the author and/or editor of many books on British and European politics, of which the most recent are The Uniting of Europe: From Discord to Concord (Routledge, 1997) and The Kosovo Crisis: America's Last War in Europe? (Reuters, 2001).

=== Members of the advisory council ===
Chairman: John Stevens, former MEP (1989 – 1999)

- Graham Bishop, consultant on European integration: Political, financial, economic and budgetary; founder of grahambishop.com
- Professor Stefan Collignon, visiting professor at Harvard University and professor of European political economy at the London School of Economics
- Brendan Donnelly, former MEP (1994 - 1999)
- Dr Hywel Ceri Jones, former director for education, training and youth at the European Commission; former chairman of the governing board of the European Policy Centre, Brussels
- Richard Laming, European Movement
- Nicolas Maclean, chief executive, NWM
- David Melding CBE, former member of the Senedd for South Wales Central (1999 and 2021)
- Robert Moreland, former MEP
- John Palmer, former political director of the European Policy Centre and journalist

=== Patrons ===
- Baroness Nicholson of Winterbourne MEP Baroness Nicholson was elected as a Member of the European Parliament for the South East region of England in June 1999 and takes the Liberal Democrat Whip. She serves as Vice President of the Committee on Foreign Affairs, Human Rights, Common Defence and Security Policy and is Rapporteur for Iraq and Romania. She is a member of the Committee on Women's Rights and Equal Opportunities and sits on two EU delegations. Baroness Nicholson previously served as a Member of the House of Commons and was vice-chairman of the Conservative Party for four years. Her NGO work includes trusteeship of the Booker Prize for English fiction literature. Baroness Nicholson has been appointed as first Special Envoy for the World Health Organisation to work on peace, health and development in the WHO's Eastern Mediterranean region.
- Lord Plumb of Coleshill Lord Plumb had a distinguished career in British agriculture and European politics. A Conservative Member of the European Parliament from 1979 to 1999 and the only British President of the European Parliament (1987–1990). Lord Plumb was also chairman of the European Parliament's Agriculture Committee; chairman of the European Democratic Group; leader of the Conservative delegation in Europe; co-president of the EU-ACP Joint Parliamentary Assembly; and a full member of the Environment, Agriculture and Development committees of the European Parliament.
- Carole Tongue was, from 1984-1999, a Member of the European Parliament serving on various committees and was the Parliament's spokeswoman on the European Car Industry and on Public Service Broadcasting. Carole Tongue is now a consultant at Citigate Public Affairs. She is also a visiting professor at the London Institute. She is a consultant to a film production company and a member of an EU High Level Group in Cultural Diversity in the Audiovisual Sector. She was recently appointed to serve on the Professional Conduct Committee of the General Medical Council.

== Contact ==
- 109-117 Middlesex Street, London E1 7JF, UK
- https://fedtrust.co.uk/

== See also ==
- Federal Union
