= Dolly Jørgensen =

Norwegian environmental historian

- Education: University of Virginia; University of Houston; Texas A&M University
- Occupation: Historian
- Known for: President of the European Society for Environmental History

Dolly Jørgensen is Professor of History at University of Stavanger, Norway and co-editor in Chief of Environmental Humanities. She served as president of the European Society for Environmental History, 2013–2017. Her research ranges from medieval to contemporary environmental issues, approached through environmental history, history of technology, and environmental humanities perspectives. Her primary areas of interest are human-animal relations, the urban environment, and environmental policymaking. Her research has been covered in media such as The New Yorker and Bioscience.

She holds a PhD in History from University of Virginia (2008), a MA in history from University of Houston (2003), and a BA in Civil Engineering from Texas A&M University (1994). In 2025, she won the Gad Rausing Prize for Outstanding Humanities Research, awarded by The Royal Swedish Academy of Letters, History and Antiquities.

== Selected works ==
=== Authored books ===
- Ghosts Behind Glass: Encountering Extinction in Museums, University of Chicago Press, 2025.
- The Medieval Pig, Boydell Press, 2024
- Recovering Lost Species in the Modern Age: Histories of Longing and Belonging, MIT Press, 2020.

=== Edited works ===
- Sharing Spaces: Technology, Mediation, and Human-Animal Relationships, co-edited with Finn Arne Jørgensen, University of Pittsburgh Press, 2024
- Silver Linings: Clouds in Art and Science, co-edited with Finn Arne Jørgensen, Museumsforlaget, 2020.
- Visions of North in Premodern Europe, co-edited with Virginia Langum, Brepols, 2018.
- New Natures: Joining Environmental History with Science and Technology Studies, co-edited with Finn Arne Jørgensen and Sara B. Pritchard, University of Pittsburgh Press, 2013.
- Northscapes: History, Technology, and the Making of Northern Environments, co-edited with Sverker Sörlin, University of British Columbia Press, 2013.
