= Pensioners Party (England) =

English political party

Pensioners Party was an English political party for pensioners. The leader was Roger Edwards.

They contested two European Parliament elections: in 2004, they stood in the West Midlands, receiving 33,501 votes (2.3%, 0.1% behind Respect); they stood in the South West in 2009, campaigning for non means-tested index linked state pensions, immigration control, replacing council tax with a local income tax, and keeping Imperial units and the Pound. They received 37,785 votes (2.4%). They deregistered as a party in 2013.

== See also ==
- Senior Citizens Party
- Scottish Senior Citizens Unity Party
