= Thames Valley College (London, Ontario) =

Career college in London, Ontario

Thames Valley College of Business & IT, also known as Information Technology Business College Inc., was a private career college in London, Ontario, Canada. It reportedly opened in 2003 and was accredited by the Ministry of Training, Colleges and Universities, under the Private Career Colleges Act of Ontario. Some references indicate that Information Technology Business College was operational earlier than 2003.

From archive of their website, the last call they made for applicants was May 2005, and the last change to their website was January 2006, like due to their closing.

Thames Valley College offered the following accredited Diploma Programs:

Accounting & Payroll Administrator,
Marketing Assistant,
Police Foundations,
Medical Office Administrator,
Office Administration,
Information Technology Technician,
Network Administrator,
Network & Internet Security Specialist,
Legal Administrative Assistant,
Computer Business Applications Specialist,
Website Designer (E-Commerce), and
Web Developer (E-Commerce).

== Student loan default rates ==
The Ontario Student Assistance Program reports default rates for private career colleges. For Thames Valley College, the percentage of student loans in default was 35.3% in 2005 and 41.7% in 2004, compared to 22.2% and 25.4% for all private career colleges.
