= Pro-Euro Conservative Party =

British political party (1999–2001)

- Leader: John Stevens
- Founded: 10 March 1999
- Dissolved: 10 December 2001
- Split from: Conservative Party
- Merged into: Liberal Democrats
- Ideology: One-nation conservatism Liberal conservatism Pro-Europeanism
- Political position: Centre-right
- Colours: Blue, Yellow

The Pro-Euro Conservative Party was a minor, Pro-European British political party, announced by John Stevens and Brendan Donnelly in February 1999, formed to contest the 1999 European Parliament election. The founders were Members of the European Parliament who had resigned from the UK Conservative Party in protest at its anti-euro stance. Their reported aim was to replace William Hague (a Eurosceptic) as Conservative leader with Europhile Kenneth Clarke. Stevens later said that they had intended to push Ken Clarke, Michael Heseltine, Chris Patten and other pro-Europeans in the Conservative Party into "an SDP-style breakaway, in combination with the Liberal Democrats". The Pro-Euro Conservative Party disbanded in 2001.

== Policies ==
The party said it was "based on traditional Conservative values", and they self-defined as "One Nation Conservatives". The main aim of the party was for the United Kingdom to join the euro, also known as "the single currency", for economic reasons. At the time the British pound was strong against the euro, which had dropped in value to be equal to the US dollar, and the then-Governor of the Bank of England Eddie George said that it would be "an act of faith" for Britain to join the Eurozone.

The party manifesto, published on 17 May 1999 and titled Time to decide, argued for greater powers for the European Parliament over the European Commission and the European Central Bank, reform of the commission, reduction of countries' veto powers, reform of the Common Agricultural Policy, a European defence and security policy, stronger political and economic ties to the Balkans, and faster EU enlargement in eastern Europe.

The Pro-Euro Conservative Party distributed leaflets calling William Hague "Bill Duce", after Mussolini, when a group of Conservative MEPs led by Daniel Hannan were reported to be planning to leave the European People's Party grouping and join with an Italian far-right party. John Stevens said Hague was "taking the Tories into an extreme, nationalist party. This is dangerous for the country and catastrophic for the Conservative Party". The PECP's party political broadcast showed an actor portraying Hague as "a down-and-out in a baseball cap ranting about pride in being British and disliking 'frogs', the European single currency and anything else from the continent", which was called "a tacky and amateurish exercise" by the Conservative Party.

== Reception ==
A MORI opinion poll of 1911 people, published on 16 February 1999, suggested that a new pro-EU conservative party could possibly win 11% of the vote.

The party received an endorsement in The Independent from writer A. N. Wilson, as well as support from Paul Howell, a former Conservative MEP who had been a speechwriter for Margaret Thatcher and Edward Heath, and Sir Anthony Meyer, a former MP and the "stalking horse" candidate against Margaret Thatcher in 1989. After William Hague ruled out Britain joining the euro under a Conservative government, former cabinet minister Lord Gilmour of Craigmillar said he would vote for the PECP. Four former Conservative MPs – Sir Julian Critchley, Sir Nicholas Scott, Sir David Knox, and Sir Robert Hicks – and four former MEPs – Margaret Daly, Adam Fergusson, Madron Seligman and Anthony Simpson – wrote in a letter to The Times that "We would have wished that William Hague's party had put forward a manifesto more like that of the Pro Euro Conservative Party. Like many Conservatives, we shall find it very difficult to know how best to cast our vote on 10 June." The Conservative Party threatened to expel any members who supported the PECP, and did expel Critchley and Gilmour a fortnight after the election.

Although the party's election literature featured Ken Clarke, asking voters "Are you more a Clarke Conservative than a Hague Conservative?", Clarke did not approve of the party or its campaign and with Michael Heseltine met with the founders of the PECP at Heseltine's home in May 1999 to try to persuade the party not to stand. Geoffrey Howe, Conservative Chancellor of the Exchequer and Foreign Secretary under Mrs Thatcher, who became head of pro-euro group Britain in Europe during the election campaign, did not endorse the PECP but said the resignations from the Conservatives "should send a clear and sombre signal to our party leadership". Andrew Lansley, then a vice-chairman of the Conservatives, called the PECP "a party of the disgruntled and disaffected".

Despite the party's name and their position as "rebel Tories", some of their candidates and officials were from the European Movement and originally from parties other than the Conservatives, such as Labour and the Liberal Democrats. The chief press officer Mark Littlewood was a Liberal Democrat who had also been a spokesman for the European Movement and later rejoined the Liberal Democrats.

== Electoral performance ==
Alternative party logo

The party stood 84 candidates in the European Parliament elections, receiving 138,097 votes, or 1.4% of the vote and no seats. In the same election the UK Independence Party, which campaigned for withdrawal from the European Union, received just under 7% of the vote and three seats in the European Parliament.

John Stevens received 3.8% of the vote as the PECP candidate in the 1999 Kensington & Chelsea by-election against Michael Portillo. The party announced that, owing to voter hostility to the words it contained, it planned to change its name after the by-election.

In November 2001, the PECP urged Conservatives to vote for the Liberal Democrat candidate in the Ipswich by-election.

== Disbanding ==
The PECP disbanded in December 2001, expressing disappointment at failing to persuade pro-European "grandees" to leave the Conservative Party and cooperate with the Liberal Democrats. Leader John Stevens called the Conservative Party under their then newly elected leader Iain Duncan Smith "a cancer of extremism and xenophobia". He was one of approximately 20 supporters who joined the Liberal Democrats and urged the remainder of the party's claimed 500 members to follow suit.

== See also ==
- The Rejoin EU Party
