= Yorkshire and the Humber (European Parliament constituency) =

Constituency of the European Parliament, 1999–2019

- European Parliament constituency
- Location among the 2014 constituencies

- Shown within England
- Member state: United Kingdom
- Created: 1999
- Dissolved: 31 January 2020
- MEPs: 7 (1999–2004); 6 (2004–2020)

Yorkshire and the Humber was a constituency of the European Parliament. It elected six Members of the European Parliament (MEPs) using the D'Hondt method of party-list proportional representation, until the UK exit from the European Union on 31 January 2020.

== Boundaries ==
The constituency corresponded to the Yorkshire and the Humber region of the United Kingdom, comprising the ceremonial counties of South Yorkshire, West Yorkshire, East Riding of Yorkshire and parts of North Yorkshire and Lincolnshire.

== History ==
It was formed as a result of the European Parliamentary Elections Act 1999, replacing a number of single-member constituencies. These were Humberside, Leeds, North Yorkshire, Sheffield, Yorkshire South, Yorkshire South West, Yorkshire West, and parts of Cleveland and Richmond and Lincolnshire and Humberside South.

MEPs for former Yorkshire and the Humber constituencies, 1979–1999
Election	1979–1984	1984–1989	1989–1994	1994–1999
Cleveland (1979–1984); Cleveland and Yorkshire North (1984–1994); Cleveland and Richmond (1994–1999)	Peter Vanneck; Conservative		David Bowe; Labour	
Humberside	Robert Battersby; Conservative		Peter Crampton; Labour	
Leeds	Derek Enright; Labour	Michael McGowan; Labour		
Lincolnshire (1979–1994); Lincolnshire and Humberside South (1994–1999)	Bill Newton Dunn; Conservative			Veronica Hardstaff; Labour
Sheffield	Richard Caborn; Labour	Bob Cryer; Labour	Roger Barton; Labour	
Yorkshire North (1979–1984); York (1984–1994); North Yorkshire (1994–1999)	Neil Balfour; Conservative	Edward McMillan-Scott; Conservative		
Yorkshire South	Brian Key; Labour/Co-operative	Norman West; Labour to 1998		Linda McAvan; Labour from 1998
Yorkshire South West	Thomas Megahy; Labour			
Yorkshire West	Barry Seal; Labour			

== Returned members ==
MEPs for Yorkshire and the Humber, 1999 onwards
Election	1999 (5th parliament)	2004 (6th parliament)	2009 (7th parliament)	2014 (8th parliament)	2019 (9th parliament)
MEP Party	Diana Wallis^{1} Liberal Democrat		Rebecca Taylor; Liberal Democrat	Mike Hookem; UKIP	Shaffaq Mohammed; Liberal Democrat
MEP Party	Edward McMillan-Scott; Conservative (1999–2009); Liberal Democrat (2010–2014)			Jane Collins; UKIP (2014–2019); Brexit Party (2019)	John Longworth; Brexit Party (May–December 2019); Independent (December 2019 to 2020), Conservative Party (2020)
MEP Party	Robert Goodwill; Conservative	Godfrey Bloom; UKIP (2004–2013); Independent (2013–2014)		Amjad Bashir; UKIP (2014–2015); Conservative (2015–2019)	Jake Pugh; Brexit Party
MEP Party	Timothy Kirkhope^{2} Conservative			John Procter; Conservative	Lucy Harris; Brexit Party (May–December 2019); Independent (December 2019 to 2020), Conservative Party (2020)
MEP Party	Richard Corbett; Labour		Andrew Brons; British National Party (2009–2012); Independent (2012); British Democratic Party (2013–2014)	Richard Corbett; Labour	
MEP Party	Linda McAvan; Labour				Magid Magid; Green
MEP Party	David Bowe; Labour	Seat abolished			

^{1}Diana Wallis resigned in January 2012.
^{2}Timothy Kirkhope was appointed to the House of Lords in 2016 and as a result was required to resign.

Key to political groups of the European Parliament (UK)
Party			Faction in European Parliament	
Brexit Party	29		Non-Inscrits	57
DUP	1		Non-Inscrits	57
Liberal Democrats	16	17	Renew Europe	108
Alliance	1	17	Renew Europe	108
Green	7	11	Greens–European Free Alliance	75
SNP	3	11	Greens–European Free Alliance	75
Plaid Cymru	1	11	Greens–European Free Alliance	75
Labour	10		Socialists and Democrats	154
Conservative	4		European Conservatives and Reformists Group	62
Sinn Féin	1		European United Left–Nordic Green Left	41
Total	73		Total	750

== Election results ==
Elected candidates are shown in bold. Brackets indicate the order in which candidates were elected, and the number of votes per seat won in their respective columns.

=== 2019 ===
2019 results

European election 2019: Yorkshire and the Humber
List	Candidates	Votes	Of total (%)	± from prev.
Brexit Party	**John Longworth** (1) **Lucy Harris** (2) **Jake Pugh** (6) James Heartfield, Andrew Allison, Christopher Barker	470,351 (156,783.67)	36.5	+36.5
Labour	**Richard Corbett** (3) Eloise Todd, Jawad Mohammed Khan, Jayne Allport, Martin Mayer, Alison Hume	210,516	16.3	−13.0
Liberal Democrats	**Shaffaq Mohammed** (4) Rosina Robson, James Blanchard, Sophie Thornton, James Baker, Ruth Coleman-Taylor	200,180	15.5	+9.3
Green	**Magid Magid** (5) Alison Teal, Andrew Cooper, Louise Houghton, Lars Kramm, Ann Forsaith	166,980	13.0	+5.1
Conservative	John Procter, Amjad Bashir, Michael Naughton, Andrew Lee, Matthew Freckleton, Sue Pascoe	92,863	7.2	−12.0
UKIP	Mike Hookem, Gary Shores, John Hancock, David Dews, Graeme Waddicar, Clifford Parsons	56,100	4.4	−26.7
Yorkshire	Chris Whitwood, Mike Jordan, Jack Carrington, Laura Walker, Bob Buxton, Dan Cochran	50,842	3.9	+2.4
Change UK	Diana Wallis, Juliet Lodge, Sophia Bow, Joshua Malkin, Rosanne McMullen, Steven Wilson	30,162	2.3	+2.3
English Democrat	David Allen, Tony Allen, Joanne Allen, Fiona Allen	11,283	0.9	−0.1
Turnout		1,289,277	33.0	−0.5

=== 2014 ===
2014 results

European election 2014: Yorkshire and The Humber
List	Candidates	Votes	Of total (%)	± from prev.
UKIP	**Jane Collins** (1) **Amjad Bashir** (4) **Mike Hookem** (6) Gary Shores, Jason Smith, Anne Murgatroyd	403,630 (134,543)	31.1	+13.7
Labour	**Linda McAvan** (2) **Richard Corbett** (5) Eleanor Tunnicliffe, Asghar Khan, Helen Mirfin-Boukouris, Darren Hughes	380,189 (190,095)	29.3	+10.5
Conservative	**Timothy Kirkhope** (3) Alex Story, John Procter, Carolyn Abbott, Michael Naughton, Ryan Stephenson	248,945	19.2	−5.3
Green	Andrew Cooper, Shan Oakes, Dr Vicky Dunn, Denise Craghill, Martin Hemingway, Kevin Warnes	102,282	7.9	−0.6
Liberal Democrats	Edward McMillan-Scott, James Monaghan, Joe Otten, Chris Foote Wood, Jacqueline Bell, Aqila Choudhry	81,108	6.25	−7.0
An Independence from Europe	Christopher Booth, Kerrie Oxenham, Malcolm Snelling, John Buchanan Martin, Paul Balderson Sootheran, Howard Roy Blake	24,297	1.9	New
BNP	Marlene Guest, Adam Walker, Danny Cooke, Joanne Brown, Steven Richard Harrison, Stuart Henshaw	20,138	1.6	−8.2
Yorkshire First	Stewart Arnold, Richard Carter, Richard Honnoraty	19,017	1.5	New
English Democrat	Chris Beverley, David Wildgoose, Ian Sutton, Colin Porter, Tom Redmood, David Allen	13,288	1.0	−1.6
No2EU	Trevor Howard, Mary Jackson, Carrie Hedderwick, Adrian O’Malley, Steven John Andrew, Iain Alaistair Dalton	3,807	0.29	−1.0
Turnout		1,296,701	33.5	+1.2

=== 2009 ===
2009 results

European election 2009: Yorkshire and The Humber
List	Candidates	Votes	Of total (%)	± from prev.
Conservative	**Edward McMillan-Scott** (1) **Timothy Kirkhope** (5) Fleur Butler, Matthew Bean, Nick Burrows, Glynis Frew	299,802 (149,901)	24.5	−0.1
Labour	**Linda McAvan** (2) Richard Corbett, Emma Hoddinott, David Bowe, Melanie Onn, Mahroof Hussain	230,009	18.8	−7.5
UKIP	**Godfrey Bloom** (3) Jonathan Arnott, Jason Smith, Toby Horton, David Daniel, Lynette Afshar	213,750	17.4	+2.9
Liberal Democrats	**Diana Wallis** (4) Stewart Arnold, Rebecca Taylor, James Monaghan, Nader Fekri, Neil Poole	161,552	13.2	−2.4
BNP	**Andrew Brons** (6) Nick Cass, Chris Beverley, Marlene Guest, Paul Harris, Trevor Brown	120,139	9.8	+1.8
Green	Martin Hemingway, Shan Oakes, Leslie Rowe, Lesley Hedges, Kevin Warnes, Steve Barnard,	104,456	8.5	+2.8
English Democrat	Michael Cassidy, Joanne Robinson, Peter Davies, David Wildgoose, Paul McEnhill, Geoffery Crossman	31,287	2.6	+1.1
Socialist Labour	William Capstick, Linda Sheriden, Stephen Yoxall, Holly Jo Yoxall, Terence Robinson, Christopher Butler	19,380	1.6	New
Christian	Sid Cordle, Andrew McClintock, Angela MacDonald, John O'Brien, Samantha Cauldwell, Rebecca Jones	16,742	1.4	New
NO2EU	Keith Gibson, Celia Foote, Jackie Grunsell, Peter Marsh, Mike Davies, Juliet Marie Boddington	15,614	1.3	New
Jury Team	Barbara Hibbert, Anthony Hooper, Ben Saxton	7,181	0.6	New
Libertas	Antony Devoy, Edward Devoy, Stephen Clark, Diana MacLeod, Trevor Bending, Kathleen Harris	6,268	0.5	New
Turnout		1,226,180	32.3	−10.3

=== 2004 ===
2004 results

European election 2004: Yorkshire and the Humber
List	Candidates	Votes	Of total (%)	± from prev.
Labour	**Linda McAvan** (1) **Richard Corbett** (5) David Bowe, Patricia Sutcliffe, Chris Naylor, Jo Coles	413,213 (206,606.5)	26.3	−5.0
Conservative	**Timothy Kirkhope** (2) **Edward McMillan-Scott** (6) Mohammed Riaz, Kenneth Irvine, Ian Bruce, Carolyn Abbott	387,369 (193,684.5)	24.6	−12.0
Liberal Democrats	**Diana Wallis** (3) Julia Gash, Stewart Arnold, Robert Adamson, Colin Ross, Zulfiqar Ali	244,607	15.6	+1.2
UKIP	**Godfrey Bloom** (4) Jonathan Arnott, John Nunn, John Walker, David Sewards, Ann Schwab	228,666	14.0	+6.9
BNP	Nicholas Cass, Christopher Beverley, John Brayshaw, John Aveyard, Paul Cromie, Dianne Carr	126,538	8.0	+6.8
Green	Mark Hill, Linda Duckenfield, John Phillips, Jonathan Dixon, John Norris, James Russell	90,337	5.7	0.0
Respect	Anas Altikriti, Mobeen Azhar, Sue Wild, Janet Alder, Kath Owen, Christopher Cheetham	29,865	1.9	New
English Democrat	Gary Cowd, Stephen Elliott, Derek Smith, Nicholas Booth	24,068	1.5	New
Independent	Robert Ellis	14,762	0.9	New
Alliance for Green Socialism	Mike Davies, Azar Iqbal, Juliet Boddington, Celia Foote, Jeannie Sutton, Steven Radford	13,776	0.9	New
Turnout		1,573,201	42.6	+23.0

=== 1999 ===
1999 results

European election 1999: Yorkshire and the Humber
List	Candidates	Votes	Of total (%)	± from prev.
Conservative	**Edward McMillan-Scott** (1) **Timothy Kirkhope** (3) **Robert Goodwill** (6) Christine Adamson, Earl of Dartmouth, David Nuttall, Raja Najabat Hussain	272,653 (90,884.33)	36.6	
Labour	**Linda McAvan** (2) **David Bowe** (4) **Richard Corbett** (7) Roger Barton, Barry Seal, Veronica Hardstaff, Dominic Shellard	233,024 (77,674.67)	31.3	
Liberal Democrats	**Diana Wallis** (5) Michael Pitts, Angela Harris, Colin Ross, Sylvia Anginotti, Robert Adamson, Madeleine Kirk	107,168	14.4	
UKIP	Gordon Rogers, Richard North, Peter Davies, Judith Longman, Clive Fairclough, David Barley, Paul Godfrey	52,824	7.1	
Green	Peg Alexander, Mark Hill, Vivienne Smith, Anthony Martin, Andy d'Agorne, Joseph Otten, Clive Lord	42,604	5.7	
Leeds Left Alliance	Michael Davis, Celia Foote, Joseph Kenyon, Jean Sutton, Michelle Hanley, Anthony Fee, Malcolm Christie	9,554	1.3	
BNP	Richard Mulhall, Adrian Marsden, Graham Cook, Christopher Ward, Paul Wilson, Ronald Smith, Jay Lee	8,911	1.2	
Pro-Euro Conservative	Julia Gash, Andrew Mayer, Louise Rowntree, Alexander Goodman, Paul McIlroy, Angela Pullen, Keith Bennett	8,075	1.1	
Socialist Labour	Linda Muir, Alan Brooke, Stephen Yoxall, Thomas Appleyard, Robert Morris, Frank Cave, Stewart Emms	7,650	1.0	
Natural Law	Geoffrey Mead, Stuart Withers, Mark Gaskell, Diana Leighton, Roger Perry, Barry Franklin, Robert Thurston	1,604	0.2	
Turnout		744,067	19.6	
