= Peter Crampton =

Peter Crampton may refer to:

- Peter Crampton (politician) (1932–2011), British Labour Party politician
- Peter Crampton (athlete) (born 1969), British hurdler and sprinter
- Peter Crampton (academic), professor of public health at the University of Otago
