= Yorkshire South =

Yorkshire South may refer to:

- South Yorkshire, a metropolitan county of England created in 1974, consisting of Barnsley, Doncaster, Rotherham, and Sheffield.
- Southern West Riding of Yorkshire (UK Parliament constituency), a former British constituency covering most of what became South Yorkshire and areas of West Yorkshire.
- Yorkshire South, a former European constituency covering part of South Yorkshire.
