= Robert Crampton =

English journalist

- Born: 10 August 1964 (age 62); Blackpool, England
- Education: Wolfreton School; Wadham College, Oxford
- Occupation: Journalist
- Notable credit(s): Beta Male, The Times
- Spouse: Nicola Almond
- Children: Sam, Rachel
- Relatives: Peter Crampton (father)

Robert Crampton (born 10 August 1964) is an English journalist. He is also the son of Peter Crampton, former Member of the European Parliament for Humberside.

== Early life ==
Crampton was born in Blackpool in 1964. His family lived in Solihull for a while before moving to Hull in 1970, where he grew up in an affluent suburb. He has an older brother, David, born in 1962. Their parents were active in politics locally; Peter Crampton was a teacher and lecturer in geography and later a United Kingdom member of the European Parliament from 1989 to 1999, representing the Humberside constituency for the Labour Party. Robert's mother came from London and was a geography teacher.

Crampton attended St Andrews County Primary School, then Wolfreton School, a local comprehensive school. At this time, he was heavily involved in the Campaign for Nuclear Disarmament. When he was 18, he was convicted of a breach of the peace, and fined £20 for his part in a political demonstration.

After leaving school he retook his A-levels, and then went on to Wadham College, Oxford, in 1986. Later, he attended the City University Journalism Department at City University, London.

== Career ==
Crampton joined The Times as a columnist in 1991. He writes Beta Male, a regular weekly column in The Times Saturday magazine. In 2008 he used the column to advertise his wish to gain practice in public speaking, "not because I was any good, but because I wasn't and wanted to be...At the risk of humiliation I want to come to talk to your school, business, darts team, whatever. I do not require, nor indeed do I merit, any payment." He received more than 400 requests. He subsequently described his experiences of speaking at Caistor Grammar School in Lincolnshire, Highbury Grove School in North London, a training day in Bath, a Rotary Club, a women's group, a prison, a church sermon, as a best man at a wedding and delivering a eulogy at a family funeral.

He also writes features and interviews in the newspaper itself. In February 2008 he exclusively previewed the new Wii Fit computer game.

His past interviewees include Tony Blair, David Cameron, Paul McCartney, Kate Winslet, Kelly Brook, Alex Ferguson, David Walliams, Liam Gallagher, Sienna Miller, and John Terry.

In 1999 he signed a deal with a publisher to write a book, tracking down his old O-Level classmates. The book was given the working title "Whatever happened to...?" and even issued with an ISBN (ISBN 0385601891), but Crampton got bored with the project and never finished it.

== Critical reception ==
The author and journalist Bryan Appleyard described his Beta Male column as "light in tone, insightful but unpretentious, and above all, just the right length. I always enjoy Crampton – a naturally funny, likeable columnist. He's the kind of fellow you'd like to go for beer with, so he'd make a good US President. It's a real drag when he's away and a substitute fills in for him."

Nigel Williams has praised his interviews: "Robert Crampton's work I really like. Somehow, he combines showmanship with something like self-effacement in a very entertaining way. To me he sounds like he's telling the truth, which is one of the most difficult things to pull off in journalism. His opinions sound hard-won and thought through, and that's to do with his prose style, which puts me in mind of what Orwell said about good prose being like a window".

== Awards ==
- Shortlisted, "Columnist of the year", British Press Awards, 2002.
- Winner, "Interviewer of the year", British Press Awards, 2004.
- Shortlisted, "Interviewer of the year", British Press Awards, 2007.

== Personal life ==
He met his future wife Nicola Almond when at school aged 12 in 1977, but only started going out with her thirteen years later. They married on 2 May 1998 in the City of London. They live in Hackney, London, with their children Sam and Rachel. They own a second home at Kingsdown Park near Deal, Kent.

=== Weight loss ===
Crampton has written about reducing his weight from 16 stone (100 kg; 220 lb) at age 50 to 12 stone (76 kg; 170 lb) at age 60, moving him into the NHS normal weight category. He has written that one weight loss method he has used was to not eat dinner 3 or 4 times per week. or not eat after 7pm at all. He now treats bread as a rare treat.
