= Amjad Bashir =

British politician (born 1952)

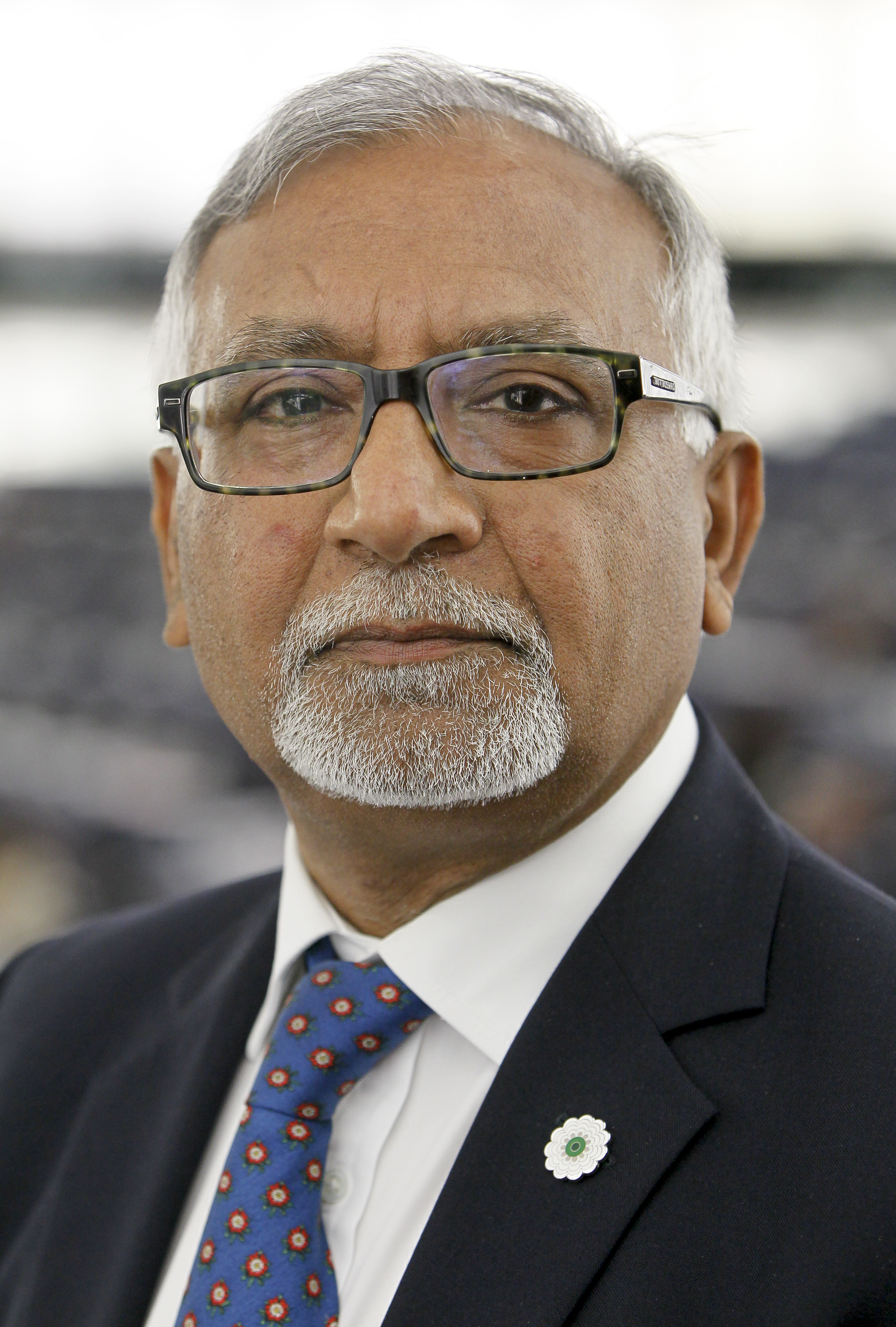

Member of the European Parliament for Yorkshire and the Humber
- In office 1 July 2014 – 1 July 2019
- Preceded by: Godfrey Bloom
- Succeeded by: Magid Magid

Personal details
- Born: Amjud Mahmood Bashir; 17 September 1952 (age 74) Jhelum, Punjab, Pakistan
- Party: Workers Party of Britain
- Other political affiliations: Conservative (1997–2012, 2015–2024); UKIP (2012–2015)
- Education: University of Bradford (BEng)
- Website: amjadbashir.com

Amjad Mahmood Bashir (Urdu: امجد محمود بشیر; born 17 September 1952) is a British politician who served as a Member of the European Parliament for the Yorkshire and the Humber region between 2014 and 2019. He was elected in 2014 for the UK Independence Party (UKIP) and defected to the Conservative Party on 24 January 2015. In April 2024 it was announced he had joined the Workers Party of Britain.

== Early life ==
Bashir was born in Pakistan, and moved to Yorkshire aged eight to live with his father who was a mill worker in Bradford. Bashir attended Thornton Grammar School before attending the University of Bradford to study chemical engineering.

== Professional career ==
Prior to being elected as Member of the European Parliament, in over 35 years Bashir built a successful business in food & catering that included among others establishing a factory to supply food counters at ASDA (Walmart). Having started from scratch on more than one occasion, he generated in total over 300 tax-paying jobs in Yorkshire and Manchester.

== Political career ==
After fifteen years as a member of the Conservative Party, Bashir joined UKIP in 2012 and was placed second on the party's list of candidates for the Yorkshire and the Humber region at the 2014 European Parliament election. UKIP topped the regional poll with 31% of the vote, winning three seats, and Bashir was thus elected as one of six MEPs for the region. He was the party's spokesman on communities and on small and medium-sized businesses until his defection to the Conservatives in January 2015.

Bashir met with Conservative leader and Prime Minister David Cameron on 23 January 2015 to discuss moving back to the party, and made the move official the following day. Cameron stated that he was "absolutely delighted that Bashir had decided to leave Ukip and join the Conservative Party". He also stated that Bashir had an "inspiring story", and that "it's another sign that in this great country of ours you can come to Britain without very much and you can be a member of the European parliament, an MP, sit in the cabinet".

Following his defection to the Conservatives, UKIP alleged that Bashir had failed to attend a meeting on 20 January 2015, three days prior to his defection, to discuss their concerns, pending an investigation, into what they described as "a number of extremely serious issues … which include unanswered financial and employment questions" and that "UKIP MEP Mike Hookem had passed on evidence of Mr Bashir's alleged wrongdoing to West Yorkshire police." More specifically, they alleged interference in a UKIP Keighley candidate selection, immigration offences in his restaurants and financial irregularities with regard to expenses incurred by his European parliamentary political group at the time, the Europe of Freedom and Direct Democracy. Bashir described the allegations as "absurd and made-up".

Bashir was defended by Conservative MEP Daniel Hannan and by then-Conservative Party Chairman Grant Shapps, both of whom criticised the allegations by UKIP.

On 20 February 2016, Bashir announced that he would support the campaign to leave the European Union in the forthcoming EU membership referendum.

As an MEP, Bashir served as full member in the European Parliament's Foreign Affairs Committee (AFET) and its Sub-Committee on Human Rights (DROI), and as substitute member in Employment (EMPL) and Industry, Research and Technology (ITRE) Committees while being also part of the inter-parliamentary delegations for Bosnia and Herzegovina and Afghanistan.

On a group level, Bashir was the chairman of the ECR Group's working group on SMEs and also Conservative parliamentary delegation spokesman on SMEs.

According to Votewatch Europe, Bashir's key statistics were as follows: Participation in roll-call votes 80% (629th) [Note: Participation by MEPs in external official activities on behalf of the European Parliament can impact on the roll call votes participation rate], loyalty to political group 90% (543rd), loyalty to national party 98,47% (443rd).

As a member of the European Parliament's AFET and DROI, he focused on international crises in particular in Africa, Middle East and South Asia. Alarmed by initial reports from the civil society and human rights NGOs on dramatically deteriorating conditions for various minorities in South Asia, including the Rohingya in Myanmar, he carried out an own-initiative report on "Statelessness in South and South East Asia" which, with the support by the ECR Group, was adopted by an overwhelming majority in the European Parliament in June 2017 (571 votes to 24, with 34 abstentions). After that, he co-authored and negotiated numerous follow-on Urgency Resolutions on Myanmar, wrote articles, addressed the EP plenary in the interest of launching a full debate in the presence of the (then) HR of the Union for Foreign Affairs and Security Policy and VP of the European Commission Federica Mogherini, hosted the largest ever event in the European Parliament on Myanmar featuring the participation of Sky News and MEPs of various other political parties (except the far right) and various diplomatic missions from South Asia and co-organized a fact-finding mission with the help of the Conservative Party and the United Nations in the world's largest refugee camp in neighbouring Bangladesh (September 2017). He took action to raise awareness on Kashmir following widespread reports by the media and human rights NGOs and hosted a discussion on "Kashmir: A new Berlin wall in South Asia (11/07/2017) with the participation of the Honourable Sardar Massod Khan, former President of Ajad Jammu and Kashmir, and prominent politicians and businesspersons from Kashmir and the UK and supported efforts together with many other MEPs from other political groups to have this item on the agenda of the Human Rights Sub-Committee (DROI) after more than a decade (1Q 2019).

As part of his agenda on religion and individual freedoms, he hosted one of the largest ever events in the European Parliament on "Islam and Women" (07/11/2017) featuring liberal-minded Muslim women from politics, business and the civil society from Muslim countries and supporting speeches from MEPs from various political parties in the European Parliament.

On markets and market liberalisation reforms, he supported efforts toward cutting of red-tape, in particular for SMEs, addressed the challenge of "e-skills for Small Businesses", shadowed the high-profile EU legislation on “EU-level scrutiny of Foreign Direct Investments” in strategic sectors targeting in particular investments from China and Russia and followed thoroughly and promoted the trade discussions between the EU and Pakistan (GSP+).

In making the case for economic liberalism he hosted the first so-called "1st Annual Economic Freedom Summit" (11-12/04/2018) on market reforms around the world with participation of MEPs from various political groups, liberal think tanks (such as the Fraser Institute), the IMF, business representatives, senior economists and government officials and diplomatic missions across the world and also introduced the Austrian School of Economics through a discussion on "Banking & Monetary Policy from the Austrian Perspective" (22 November 2018) with the support of the Ludwig Von Mises Institute Europe and the Cobden Center, organised a debate on "Liberalisation and Precariousness" (28 November 2017) inviting opposing views from the Institute for Employment Studies and Epicenter (two leading independent centres for research and evidence-based consultancy think-tanks) and championed the option for enhanced equivalence as a win-win proposition in the debate on post-Brexit EU-UK Financial Services (28 February 2018).

His last large policy-driven public event in the European Parliament was on education reforms, entrepreneurial-driven leadership and worldwide best practises. Organized with the African Leadership Academy from Johannesburg, South Africa, and featuring among others Harvard University, Singapore University, Accenture and senior government officials with background in education reforms, the objective of the conference on “Cultivating Change-makers: the Future of Education” (6/02/2019) was to showcase a changing paradigm, in particular in developing countries, shifting from a lecture-driven to an entrepreneurial-oriented education.

Bashir hosted, with the support from the Embassy of Pakistan, a "Pakistani Cultural Festival" (30 January 2018) in the most prestigious conference area of the European Parliament. This event gathered over 500 attendees (MEPs, officials from all the EU Institutions, Ambassadors from all over the world, journalists). He regularly flew out of Leeds Bradford Airport on KLM and has held discussions for their resumption to Pakistan.

=== 2019 Conservative candidacy ===
Bashir was selected as the Conservative Party candidate in Leeds North East, but he was then suspended from the party on 20 November 2019 because of alleged comments he had made. Bashir remained on the ballot paper as the Conservative Party candidate and finished second.

The comments in question were made while he was a UKIP MEP. During a debate on 11 September 2014 in the European Parliament, Bashir had described British Jews travelling to Israel and returning as "brainwashed extremists". These comments were anti-Israel and as potentially antisemitic and, when resurfacing (from a Jewish Chronicle exclusive) on 18 November, were condemned by the Board of Deputies on the same day. Bashir apologised for the comments he had made.

=== 2024 defection to Workers Party of Britain ===
In April 2024 it was announced he had joined The Workers Party of Britain (WPB) and planned to stand at the 2024 United Kingdom general election in Leeds West and Pudsey, though ultimately he was not selected as the WPB candidate in the constituency.

== Awards and nominations ==
In January 2015, Bashir was nominated for the Politician of the Year award at the British Muslim Awards.
