= Alliance for Democracy and Freedom =

Minor political party in the United Kingdom

- Abbreviation: ADF
- President: Mike Hookem
- Leader: Mark Conway
- Deputy Leader: Dr Teck Khong
- Founded: 20 August 2020
- Headquarters: 328 Shaw Road; Oldham, Lancashire; OL1 4WH
- Political position: Right-wing
- Colours: Blue

Website
- https://adfparty.uk/

The Alliance for Democracy and Freedom (ADF) is a political party in the United Kingdom led by Ken Thomson.

== History ==
The Alliance for Democracy and Freedom was registered as a political party in 2020. The party was co-founded by Mike Hookem, a former Member of the European Parliament (MEP) for the UK Independence Party (UKIP), who served as the party's first chairman. It was described as an "anti-lockdown party".

The party targets voters disillusioned with the mainstream establishment parties, claiming to stand for freedom of speech and calling for the UK to withdraw from all “non-democratic supranational bodies” including the UN, the WHO, the IMF and NATO. It has stated that “ADF Candidates are not whipped", and are free to serve local residents and businesses, if elected.

At the 2023 local elections, 23 candidates were nominated for the ADF, including former UKIP candidate Mark Vallance, who had posted online about "eradicating" Muslims, and former British National Party (BNP) candidate Colin Burrows.

The party stood candidates in nine constituencies at the 2024 general election, polling a total of 1,586 votes. Dr Teck Khong, a GP and former police surgeon for the Leicestershire force, who also served as the party's leader at the time, stood in Melton and Syston. He placed seventh with 348 votes (0.8%).

In the May 2025 local elections, the ADF fielded 6 candidates across England, securing no seats.

At the 2026 Scottish Parliament election, the ADF fielded three constituency and four regional candidates, polling 2,385 votes overall. David Ballantine contested the 2026 Aberdeen South by-election for the ADF; he placed seventh with 59 votes (0.2%).
