= Godfrey Bloom =

British politician

Godfrey Bloom TD
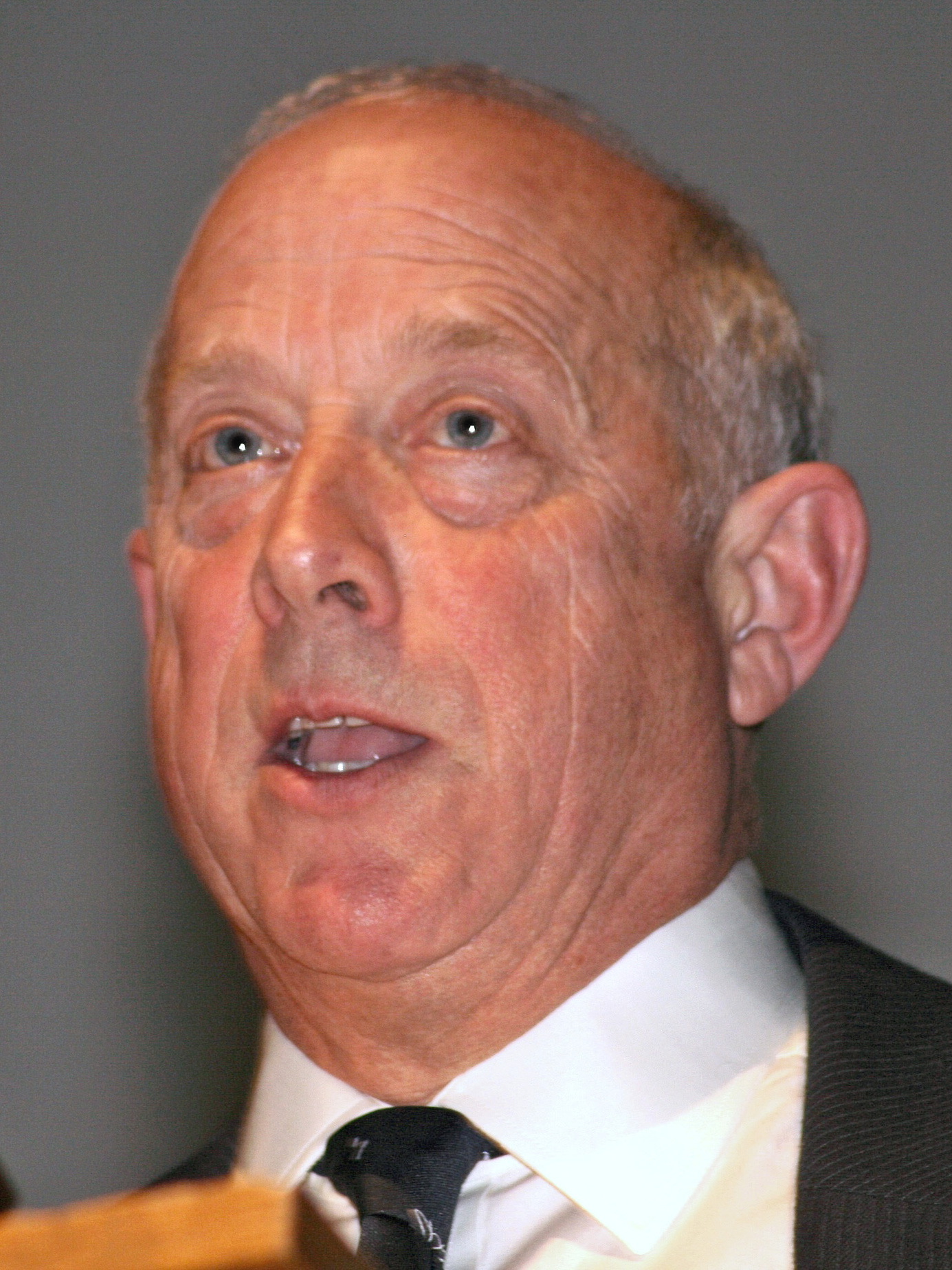
- Bloom in 2009

UKIP Economics Spokesman
- In office 22 May 2013 – 22 February 2014
- Leader: Nigel Farage
- Preceded by: Position established
- Succeeded by: Steven Woolfe

Member of the European Parliament for Yorkshire and the Humber
- In office 1 May 2004 – 2 July 2014
- Preceded by: Robert Goodwill
- Succeeded by: Amjad Bashir

Personal details
- Born: 22 November 1949 (age 76) Lewisham, London, England
- Party: UK Independence Party (1995–2014); Independent (2013–14)
- Spouse: Katryna Skowronek (m. 1986)
- Profession: Financial Economist
- Military career
- Allegiance: United Kingdom
- Branch: British Army (Reserve)
- Service years: 1977–1996
- Rank: Major
- Service number: 501912
- Unit: Royal Corps of Transport

Godfrey William Bloom TD (born 22 November 1949) is an English author, economist and former politician who served as a Member of the European Parliament (MEP) for Yorkshire and the Humber from 2004 to 2014. He was elected for the UK Independence Party in the European elections of 2004 and 2009, representing UKIP until September 2013, when UKIP withdrew the party whip from him. He then sat as an Independent until the end of his term of office in May 2014. Bloom resigned his UKIP party membership on 13 October 2014.

During his tenure, he received attention for making remarks considered objectionable by his party leader, for his opinions concerning climate change and for making other controversial comments. On 20 September 2013, UKIP withdrew the party whip from Bloom after he hit journalist Michael Crick in the street with a conference brochure, threatened a second reporter, and at the party's conference referred to his female audience as sluts. Bloom resigned his party whip from UKIP on 24 September 2013 and thereafter sat as an Independent MEP until the end of his term in office on 2 July 2014. Nigel Farage, the UKIP party leader, said "the trouble with Godfrey is that he is not a racist, he's not an extremist, or any of those things, and he's not even anti-women, but he has a sort-of-rather old-fashioned Territorial Army sense of humour which does not translate very well in modern Britain".

Bloom was removed as Honorary President of the Ludwig von Mises Centre in December 2017, the organisation citing his comments on Twitter.

== Early life ==
Bloom was born on 22 November 1949, the son of Alan Bloom and his wife, Phyllis. His father served as a fighter pilot during the Second World War. Bloom was educated at St. Olave's Grammar School.

== Military ==
Bloom was commissioned into the Royal Corps of Transport (Territorial Army) in 1977. attending the Royal Military Academy, Sandhurst for the two week course for territorials. In 1992 he was promoted to the rank of major. He left the TA in 1996.

== Professional career ==
Bloom worked as a financial economist. In 1996 he was part of Francis Maude's regulatory consultancy panel from which he later resigned. In his last position, he worked as the director of the investment company TBO in which he is a major shareholder.

== Political career ==
Bloom contested the Conservative-held seat of Haltemprice and Howden for UKIP at the 1997 general election, coming fifth.

In 2004, Bloom's election to the Yorkshire and the Humber seat was UKIP's first seat in the region in the European elections. In 2009, he was re-elected. In the parliament Bloom was a member of the Committee on Economic and Monetary Affairs and the Committee on Women's Rights and Gender Equality.

On 20 September 2013, during its party conference, UKIP withdrew the whip from Bloom. At a party conference meeting he had referred to his female audience as sluts. Subsequently, he got into a confrontation with journalist Michael Crick in the streets, hitting him over the head with the conference brochure, and allegedly threatened ITV reporter Paul Brand, by saying, "You treat me badly, you'll get a lot worse than that (Crick's slap) ... that is a threat to any journalist."

On 24 September 2013, he resigned his UKIP party whip, while retaining his party membership. His statement said: "I have felt for some time now that the 'New UKIP' is not really right for me any more".

Bloom and Crick met again in May 2014. The two shook hands and had lunch together and Bloom thanked Crick, describing the incident as a "defining moment" that made him realise that he "wasn't really suited to party politics".

In December 2013, as a result of his various controversies, Bloom was awarded the Plain English Campaign's Foot in Mouth Award. A spokesman said that Bloom was "an overwhelming choice" who "could easily have won this award on at least two other occasions... [he's] a wince-inducing gaffe machine and we could fill a page or two with his ill-advised quotes from 2013 alone".

== Views and incidents ==
=== Banking and financial crisis ===
Bloom was ejected from the Mansion House in 2009 for heckling Lord Turner for giving staff bonuses after the massive regulatory failure of 2008/09. According to The Daily Telegraph he was the first man to be ejected since John Wilkes in the late-18th century. In a letter to UKIP, Turner wrote that "Mr Bloom will not be receiving any further invitations to Mansion House events nor will be welcome at the Brussels Annual reception [...] As to future Mansion House events we will be seeking a different MEP from UKIP as a potential guest." Bloom signed the petition in disgust at the knighthood for the failures of Hector Sants.

He is a member of the Ludwig von Mises Institute.

Bloom was a co-author of Wolfson Prize Economics Submission with Pat Barron and Philipp Bagus. He warned that credit agencies would be "castrated" by too much regulation of the EU. Bloom claims that most MEPs have "little or no business experience" and do not understand the consequences of their actions.

=== Women's rights ===
A few weeks after being appointed to the European Parliament's Committee on Women's Rights and Gender Equality on 20 July 2004, Bloom told an interviewer that, "no self-respecting small businessman with a brain in the right place would ever employ a lady of child-bearing age." Around the same time, he said that "I just don't think [women] clean behind the fridge enough" and that "I am here to represent Yorkshire women who always have dinner on the table when you get home." Bloom told BBC Radio 4's Today programme that his comments were "said for fun" to illustrate a more serious point, that equal-rights legislation was, he claimed, putting women out of work.

Bloom stated that he had visited brothels in Hong Kong. He said he never consummated the visits, and also claimed "terrified young women beaten into prostitution often from Eastern Europe [...] is only a very small aspect of the flesh trade", and concluded that "in short, most girls do it because they want to."

After inviting students from the University of Cambridge Women's Rugby Club to Brussels in 2004, he was accused of sexual assault, making "sexist and misogynistic remarks" and using offensive language during a dinner party. One student handed a formal letter of protest to the President of the European Parliament, heavily criticising Bloom's behaviour. Bloom, who sponsored the club with £3,000 a year, denied sexual harassment.

In a piece for politics.co.uk in August 2013, Bloom attempted to set the record straight about his earlier comments on gender equality. He argued against quotas for women in boardrooms, claimed that feminism was a "passing fashion" created by "shrill, bored, middle-class women of a certain physical genre" and that any men who supported feminism were "the slightly effete politically correct chaps who get sand kicked in their face on the beach." He said that women were better at "[finding] the mustard in the pantry" than driving a car.

=== Climate change ===
Bloom rejects anthropogenic global warming. He said in 2009: "As far as I am concerned man-made global warming is nothing more than a hypothesis that hasn't got any basis in fact. Every day more scientists are modifying their initial views".

=== Rainbow Warrior bombing ===
At the 2009 United Nations Climate Change Conference in Copenhagen, Bloom was filmed in front of the Greenpeace flagship, Rainbow Warrior II, saying, "Here we have one of the most truly fascist boats since 1945, well done the French for sinking one of these things." He was referring to the 1985 bombing of the ship's predecessor by French government agents in which Dutch photographer Fernando Pereira was killed. After criticism, the video was removed from Bloom's YouTube channel and he said he had forgotten about the death.

=== Other incidents ===
In December 2008, Bloom was carried out by an intern after making a speech in the European Parliament while drunk, the second occasion on which he was accused of being drunk in the chamber. During the speech, Bloom said that the MEPs from Poland, the Czech Republic and Latvia did not understand economic relations. In February 2012, Bloom interrupted a debate with the question whether the Cambridge University Women's Rugby team should wear their logo on the front or back of their shirts. Later he admitted consuming alcohol and "very heavy" prescription painkillers after breaking his collarbone in a riding accident.

On 24 November 2010, Bloom was ejected from the European Parliament after directing a Nazi slogan at German MEP Martin Schulz who was speaking in a debate on the economic crisis in Ireland. Bloom interrupted Schulz and shouted "Ein Volk, ein Reich, ein Führer" at him. He then proceeded to call the latter "an undemocratic fascist", a remark for which he was removed from the chamber. Labour MEP group leader Glenis Willmott described his behavior as "an insult to all those who have fought against fascism" whilst Liberal Democrat group leader Fiona Hall described him as a "national embarrassment".

At the height of the 2009 parliamentary expenses scandal, Bloom complained about the lack of manners of the political class. On his website, he pointed out that, unlike many others, he would not employ family members in his parliamentary staff. Bloom later conceded that three members of his staff were also employed part-time at TBO, the company in which he is a major shareholder, and one of these is his wife's niece. Bloom failed to declare his interest in TBO to European Parliament officials and in 2008 Bloom's company TBO was fined £28,000 by the Financial Services Authority for 'posing an "unacceptable risk" to customers'. In August 2014, TBO was fined and ordered to pay more than £2 million in damages to a retired couple, having ignored their request for cautious financial planning and "gambled" almost all their clients' money on high risk investments with an almost complete loss.

In July 2013, Bloom made a speech about Britain's foreign aid in which he referred to countries as "Bongo Bongo Land". A video was passed to The Guardian newspaper. A spokesman for UKIP was reported as saying that Bloom's remarks were being "discussed right at the very highest level of the party". After refusing to apologise, he later said he regretted the comments but clarified it by saying that whilst he intended it to be derogatory, he regretted that it had caused offence and he didn't mean it to be racist. Party leader Nigel Farage later asked him not to use the phrase again.

In an interview in August 2013, Bloom described Prime Minister David Cameron as "pigeon-chested; the sort of chap I used to beat up."

During a LBC Radio interview in November 2013, he called for the unemployed and public sector workers to lose the right to vote.

In January 2014, broadcaster Michael Crick stated that Bloom, supporting the motion "Post-war Britain has seen too much immigration" in a debate at the Oxford Union, asked a disabled student who was speaking against the motion if he was Richard III. According to Crick, Bloom told him that the student had taken his remark "in good spirit" with both sharing drinks during an after-debate reception, suggesting Crick confirm this with the student. Crick followed up the suggestion whereby the student accepted Bloom's version of events, stating that, although the comment was not "very nice," he and Bloom got on well, and that Bloom was "a very interesting man to talk to." Fellow supporter of the motion, journalist and author Douglas Murray, described Bloom's comment as "gruesome" and "the cruellest thing."

In December 2017, Bloom wrote a tweet identifying Goldman Sachs as an "international Jewish bank" (in response to a tweet about Brexit by the bank's CEO Lloyd Blankfein). The tweet was described as anti-Semitic by two other tweeters.

On 2 December 2019, days after the 2019 London Bridge stabbing, Bloom tweeted in response to pleas from the father of one victim, Jack Merritt, that politicians not use his son's death for political gains:

"As I understand it your son died because he believed early release for jihadists was justified because they could be rehabilitated

Society is demanding these releases stop immediately
A very pragmatic view, nothing vile about it.

Grieve silently is my advice"
