= David Bowe (politician) =

British Labour politician

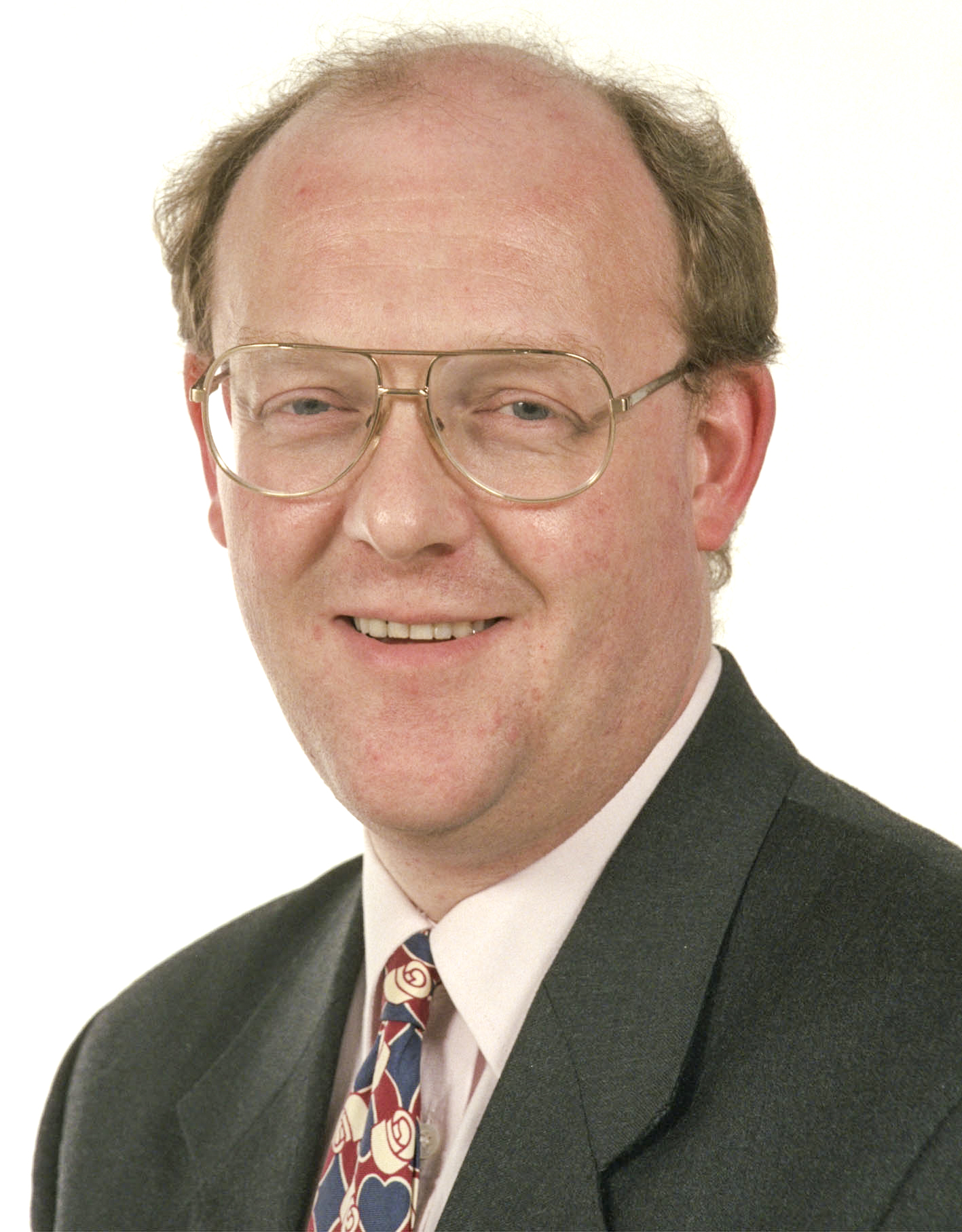
- Bowe in 1994

Member of the European Parliament for Yorkshire and the Humber Cleveland and Richmond (1994-1999) Cleveland and Yorkshire North (1989–1994)
- In office 15 June 1989 – 10 June 2004
- Preceded by: Peter Vanneck
- Succeeded by: Constituency abolished

Personal details
- Born: 19 July 1955 (age 70)
- Party: Labour

David Robert Bowe (born 19 July 1955) is a former Member of the European Parliament for Labour from 1989 to 2004.

Bowe was educated at Sunderland Polytechnic, Teesside Polytechnic, and the University of Bath. He worked as a science teacher, and became active in the Labour Party, serving on Middlesbrough District Council, and on the executive of the party's northern region.

Bowe was elected to the European Parliament at the 1989 European Parliament election, representing Cleveland & Yorkshire North (1989–1994), then Cleveland & Richmond (1994–1999) and Yorkshire and the Humber (1999–2004).

Bowe stood for re-election in 2004, but was defeated.
