= Yorkshire South (European Parliament constituency) =

Former European Parliament constituency

- European Parliament constituency
- Boundary within the Yorkshire and the Humber (1979-1984)
- Member state: United Kingdom
- Created: 1979
- Dissolved: 1999
- MEPs: 1

Sources
- United Kingdom Election Results

Yorkshire South was a European Parliament constituency covering most of South Yorkshire in England.

Prior to its uniform adoption of proportional representation in 1999, the United Kingdom used first-past-the-post for the European elections in England, Scotland and Wales. The European Parliament constituencies used under that system were smaller than the later regional constituencies and only had one Member of the European Parliament each.

The area was later included in the Yorkshire and the Humber European Parliament Constituency, which was represented by seven members in 1999–2004 and six from 2004 onwards.

Boundary within Yorkshire and the Humber (1984-1994)

Boundary within Yorkshire and the Humber (1994-1999)

== Boundaries ==
1979–1984: Barnsley; Dearne Valley; Doncaster; Don Valley; Penistone; Rotherham; Rother Valley.

1984–1999: Barnsley Central; Barnsley East; Doncaster Central; Doncaster North; Don Valley; Rotherham; Rother Valley; Wentworth.

== Members of the European Parliament ==
Elected	Name	Party	Notes
1979	Brian Key	Labour	
1984	Norman West	Labour	Resigned March 1998
May 1998 by-election	Linda McAvan	Labour	
1999	Constituency abolished: see Yorkshire and the Humber		

== Results ==
European Parliament election, 1979: Yorkshire South
Party	Candidate	Votes	%	±%
Labour	Brian Key	83,490	58.3	
Conservative	M. N. F. Robinson	46,656	32.6	
Liberal	W. P. Capstick	13,025	9.1	
Majority		36,834	25.7	
Turnout		143,171	27.0	
Labour win (new seat)				

European Parliament election, 1984: Yorkshire South
Party	Candidate	Votes	%	±%
Labour	Norman West	98,020	66.4	+8.1
Conservative	Rosemary P. N. Pockley	30,271	20.5	–12.1
SDP	Douglas Eden	19,306	13.1	+4.0
Majority		67,749	45.9	+20.2
Turnout		147,597	28.6	+1.6
Labour hold		Swing		

European Parliament election, 1989: Yorkshire South
Party	Candidate	Votes	%	±%
Labour	Norman West	121,060	69.4	+3.0
Conservative	James Clappison	29,276	16.8	–3.7
Green	Tony Grace	19,063	10.9	New
SLD	Brian J. Boulton	5,039	2.9	–10.2
Majority		91,784	52.6	+6.7
Turnout		174,438	33.5	+4.9
Labour hold		Swing		

European Parliament election, 1994: Yorkshire South
Party	Candidate	Votes	%	±%
Labour	Norman West	109,004	72.7	+3.3
Conservative	Jon L. Howard	20,695	13.0	–3.8
Liberal Democrats	Christine Roderick	11,798	7.9	+5.0
UKIP	Peter Davies	3,948	2.6	New
Green	John H. Waters	3,775	2.5	–8.4
Natural Law	Nigel J. Broome	681	0.5	New
Majority		88,309	58.9	+6.3
Turnout		149,901	28.6	–4.9
Labour hold		Swing		

Yorkshire South by-election, 1998
Party	Candidate	Votes	%	±%
Labour	Linda McAvan	62,275	52.2	–20.5
Liberal Democrats	Diana Wallis	22,051	18.5	+10.6
Conservative	Robert Goodwill	21,085	17.7	+4.7
UKIP	Peter Davies	13,830	11.6	+9.0
Majority		40,224	33.7	–25.2
Turnout		119,241	23.4	–5.2
Labour hold		Swing		
