= Jake Pugh =

British politician and businessman (born 1960)

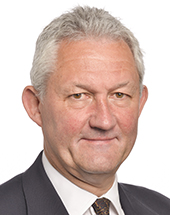

Member of the European Parliament for Yorkshire and the Humber
- In office 2 July 2019 – 31 January 2020
- Preceded by: Mike Hookem
- Succeeded by: Constituency abolished

Personal details
- Born: 20 October 1960 (age 65) Pembury, Kent, England
- Party: Brexit (since 2019)
- Other political affiliations: Referendum (1997)
- Education: Rugby School
- Alma mater: Durham University
- Occupation: Politician, Businessman
- Website: jakepughview.com

Edward Francis Pugh (born 20 October 1960) is a British politician, and businessman. Pugh was a Brexit Party Member of the European Parliament (MEP) for Yorkshire and the Humber from 2019 to 2020.

== Early life and career ==
Edward Francis Pugh was born on 20 October 1960 in Pembury, Kent, England. Both his parents were Conservative Party activists. His older brother, businessman Henry Pugh, died in 2013. His early education was at the private Rugby School. Pugh studied economics and politics at Durham University (Hatfield College). As a student he played cricket alongside Tim Curtis and Steve Henderson and later played for the 2nd XI at Warwickshire.

He started his financial career as a broker for the former American investment bank Drexel Burnham Lambert in 1983, and later worked in the wealth management division for six years for the British investment bank Barclays. Pugh has also worked as a managing director for the futures division of ICAP.

He is the director of PughView Ltd, a strategy consultancy.

== Political career ==
In the 1997 general election, he contested the Richmond Park constituency on behalf of the Eurosceptic Referendum Party. Pugh was fourth in the election with 1,467 votes (2.6%). He voted for Jeremy Corbyn in the 2015 Labour Party leadership election.

Pugh voted for Brexit in the 2016 United Kingdom European Union membership referendum. He supports Brexit as he felt that the European Union was undemocratic, and protectionist. In the 2019 European parliamentary election, Pugh stood as a candidate for the Brexit Party in the Yorkshire and Humber constituency. He was third on his party's list, and was elected as one of its three MEPs in the constituency.

In the European parliament, Pugh was a member of the Committee on Economic and Monetary Affairs.

In August 2020, Pugh argued that the UK should change its foreign policy towards the EU by "doing everything we can to undermine the EU economically, militarily and politically."
