= Humberside (European Parliament constituency) =

Former European Parliament constituency

- European Parliament constituency
- Boundary within Yorkshire and the Humber (1979-1984)
- Member state: United Kingdom
- Created: 1979
- Dissolved: 1999
- MEPs: 1

Humberside was a European Parliament constituency, covering most of the former Humberside district of England.

Before its uniform adoption of proportional representation in 1999, the United Kingdom used first-past-the-post for the European elections in England, Scotland and Wales. The European Parliament constituencies used under that system were smaller than the later regional constituencies and only had one Member of the European Parliament each.

In 1999, the constituency became part of the much larger Yorkshire and the Humber constituency.

Boundary within Yorkshire and the Humber (1984–1994)

Boundary within Yorkshire and the Humber (1994–1999)

== Boundaries ==
1979-1984: Bridlington; Brigg and Scunthorpe; Haltemprice; Howden; Hull Central; Hull East; Hull West.

1984-1994: Beverley; Bridlington; Brigg and Cleethorpes; Great Grimsby; Hull East; Hull North; Hull West.

1994-1999: Beverley; Boothferry; Bridlington; Glanford and Scunthorpe; Hull East; Hull North; Hull West.

== Members of the European Parliament ==
Elected	Name	Party
1979	Robert Battersby	Conservative
1989	Peter Crampton	Labour

== Results ==
European Parliament election, 1979: Humberside
Party	Candidate	Votes	%	±%
Conservative	Robert Battersby	79,531	51.7	
Labour	Michael Wheaton	56,521	36.8	
Liberal	Robert Walker	17,643	11.5	
Majority		23,010	14.9	
Turnout		153,695	30.1	
Conservative win (new seat)				

European Parliament election, 1984: Humberside
Party	Candidate	Votes	%	±%
Conservative	Robert Battersby	61,952	43.2	−8.5
Labour	Peter Crampton	53,937	37.7	+0.9
SDP	Will Unwin	27,318	19.1	+7.6
Majority		8,015	5.5	−9.4
Turnout		143,207	28.5	−1.6
Conservative hold		Swing		

European Parliament election, 1989: Humberside
Party	Candidate	Votes	%	±%
Labour	Peter Crampton	74,163	45.4	+7.7
Conservative	Robert Battersby	57,835	35.4	−7.8
Green	Jan Clark	23,835	14.6	New
SLD	Frank L. Parker	3,989	2.5	−16.6
SDP	Will Unwin	3,419	2.1	New
Majority		16,328	10.0	N/A
Turnout		163,241	32.2	+3.7
Labour gain from Conservative		Swing		

European Parliament election, 1994: Humberside
Party	Candidate	Votes	%	±%
Labour	Peter Crampton	87,296	51.9	+5.5
Conservative	Donald Stewart	46,678	27.8	−7.6
Liberal Democrats	Diana Wallis	28,818	17.1	+14.6
Green	Sharon Mummery	4,170	2.5	−12.1
Natural Law	Anna Miszewska	1,100	0.7	New
Majority		40,618	24.1	+14.1
Turnout		168,062	32.4	+0.2
Labour hold		Swing		
