= Frank Cave =

British trade unionist

Frank Cave (17 December 1942 – 7 January 2002) was a British trade unionist and political activist.

Cave was born in Edlington in Yorkshire and grew up in nearby Brodsworth. He became a coal miner on leaving school, and quickly became active in the National Union of Mineworkers (NUM). As a committed socialist, he became a key ally of Arthur Scargill, then a member of the branch committee at a nearby pit.

Cave rose through the ranks of the NUM, becoming the Brodsworth pit's delegate, then gaining election to the executive of the Yorkshire Area and, in 1982, becoming Agent for the Yorkshire Area, then a full-time post. Yorkshire was the largest area of the NUM, so he played a key role during the strike of 1984/5.

In 1990, Cave was elected as Vice President of the NUM, but the national programme of pit closures had reduced the importance of this role, and Cave had time to devote to other political activities. In particular, he was a strong support of Fidel Castro, and arranged aid convoys to Cuba, as a result of which he travelled to the country and met Castro. He also joined Scargill's Socialist Labour Party, and was elected as its President in 1997, serving until his death in 2002. In this role, he stood on the party list in the 1999 European Parliament election in Yorkshire and the Humber, but was not elected.

Scargill and Cave were removed as trustees of the Yorkshire Miners' Welfare Trust Fund Scheme and the Yorkshire Miners' Welfare Convalescent Homes in 1997, after the High Court found that they had ignored rules on the transfer of funds, in an attempt to avoid them becoming subject to partnership funding schemes, which they opposed. The Court agreed that the two had not attempted to profit from this transfer.
