= Linda McAvan =

British Labour politician

Linda McAvan OBE
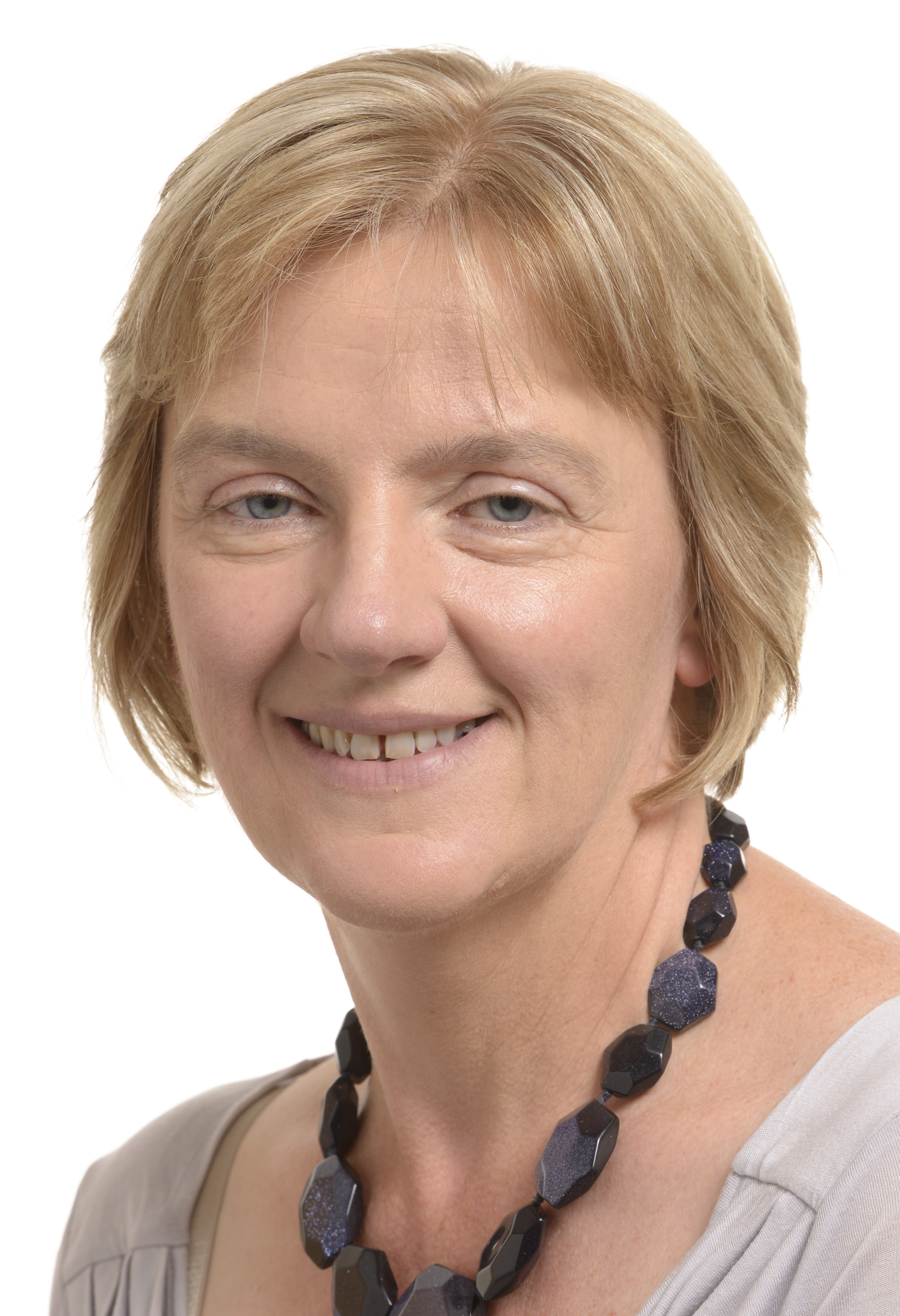

Member of the European Parliament for Yorkshire and the Humber Yorkshire South (1998–1999)
- In office 7 May 1998 – 18 April 2019
- Preceded by: Norman West
- Succeeded by: Lucy Harris

Personal details
- Born: 2 December 1962 (age 63) Bradford, West Riding of Yorkshire, England
- Party: Labour
- Spouse: Paul Blomfield MP
- Education: Heriot-Watt University

Linda McAvan OBE (born 2 December 1962) is a British Labour Party politician, who was a Member of the European Parliament (MEP) for Yorkshire South and Yorkshire and the Humber from 1998, when she was first elected in a by-election following the resignation of Norman West. She served until her resignation on 19 April 2019.

Before being elected McAvan worked for Barnsley Borough Council and was the European Officer for the Coalfields Community Campaign.

== Member of the European Parliament ==
McAvan was a Member of the European Parliament since 1998. From 2014 until 2019, she served as chairwoman of the Committee on Development. In this capacity, she co-chaired (alongside David McAllister) the Democracy Support and Election Coordination Group (DEG), which oversees the Parliament's election observation missions.

In addition to her committee assignments, McAvan was a member of the ACP-EU Joint Parliamentary Assembly. She chaired the European Parliament's Fair Trade Working Group and serves on the European Parliament Intergroup on the Western Sahara as well as on the European Parliament Intergroup on Children's Rights. She is also a supporter of the MEP Heart Group, a group of parliamentarians who have an interest in promoting measures that will help reduce the burden of cardiovascular diseases (CVD).

Between 2002 and 2003, McAvan served as one of 16 representatives of the European Parliament in the Convention on the Future of Europe, led by former French President Valéry Giscard d'Estaing.

In 2002, McAvan was voted UK European Woman of the Year; she received her award from the former Secretary of State for Northern Ireland Mo Mowlam, who praised her efforts to engage women in the future of Europe. Later that year, however, she lost out against Gary Titley in the contest to select a new leader of British Labour MEPs.

From 2004 to 2009, McAvan served as treasurer of the European Parliament's Socialist Group. In June 2007 she was elected vice president of the group.

Between 2004 and 2014, McAvan served on the Committee on the Environment, Public Health and Food Safety. In 2009, she drafted the European Parliament's report on monitoring medicine safety. She also sat on the Temporary Committee on Climate Change between 2007 and 2009; in this capacity, she was part of the Parliament's delegations to the 2008 United Nations Climate Change Conference in Poznań and to the 2009 United Nations Climate Change Conference in Copenhagen.

McAvan supported Owen Smith in the 2016 Labour Party (UK) leadership election.

Labour Party members elected McAvan to be the top-ranked Labour candidate for Yorkshire and the Humber in the 2009 European elections, narrowly beating Richard Corbett for the top place. In 2014, she again topped the ballot. She stood down as an MEP on 19 April 2019.

== Life after politics ==
Since leaving the European Parliament, McAvan has been working as executive director for European relations at the European Climate Foundation.

== Other activities ==
- National Coal Mining Museum for England, Member of the Steering Committee
- Reconsidering European Contributions to Global Justice (GLOBUS), Member of the Policy Advisory Board

== Recognition ==
McAvan was appointed Officer of the Order of the British Empire (OBE) in the 2020 New Year Honours for charitable and political services.

== Personal life ==
McAvan is married to Paul Blomfield, who, from 2010 to 2024, was the Labour MP for Sheffield Central. Her constituency office was in Wath-upon-Dearne.
