= Yorkshire West (European Parliament constituency) =

Former European Parliament constituency

- European Parliament constituency
- Boundary within the Yorkshire and the Humber (1979-1984)
- Member state: United Kingdom
- Created: 1979
- Dissolved: 1999
- MEPs: 1

Sources
- United Kingdom election results

Yorkshire West was a European Parliament constituency covering the western parts of West Yorkshire in England, including Bradford and Halifax.

Prior to its uniform adoption of proportional representation in 1999, the United Kingdom used first-past-the-post for the European elections in England, Scotland and Wales. The European Parliament constituencies used under that system were smaller than the later regional constituencies and only had one Member of the European Parliament each.

When it was created in England in 1979, it consisted of the Westminster Parliament constituencies of Bradford North, Bradford South, Bradford West, Brighouse and Spenborough, Halifax, Keighley, Shipley and Sowerby. In 1984, Batley and Spen and Calder Valley replaced Brighouse and Spenborough, and Sowerby, but Batley and Spen was removed again in 1994.

The area was later included in the Yorkshire and the Humber European Parliament Constituency, which was represented by seven members in 1999–2004 and six from 2004 onwards.

Boundary within Yorkshire and the Humber (1984-1994)

Boundary within Yorkshire and the Humber (1994-1999)

== Boundaries ==
1979–1984: Bradford North; Bradford South; Bradford West; Brighouse and Spenborough; Halifax; Keighley; Shipley; Sowerby.

1984–1994: Batley and Spen; Bradford North; Bradford South; Bradford West; Calder Valley; Halifax; Keighley; Shipley.

1994–1999: Bradford North; Bradford South; Bradford West; Calder Valley; Halifax; Keighley; Shipley.

== Members of the European Parliament ==
Elected	Name	Party
1979	Barry Seal	Labour
1999	Constituency abolished: see Yorkshire and the Humber	

== Results ==
European Parliament election, 1979: Yorkshire West
Party	Candidate	Votes	%	±%
Labour	Barry Seal	76,552	46.3	
Conservative	Lord St Oswald	73,555	44.4	
Liberal	J. M. S. Cherry	15,460	9.3	
Majority		2,997	1.9	
Turnout		165,567	33.3	
Labour win (new seat)				

European Parliament election, 1984: Yorkshire West
Party	Candidate	Votes	%	±%
Labour	Barry Seal	86,259	47.8	+1.5
Conservative	Ian Bruce	65,405	36.3	−8.1
SDP	Edward Lyons	28,709	15.9	+6.6
Majority		20,854	11.5	+9.6
Turnout		180,373	32.2	−1.1
Labour hold		Swing		

European Parliament election, 1989: Yorkshire West
Party	Candidate	Votes	%	±%
Labour	Barry Seal	108,644	50.0	+2.2
Conservative	Graham T. Hall	70,717	32.5	−3.8
Green	Nick Parrott	28,308	13.0	New
SLD	Peter Wrigley	9,765	4.5	−11.4
Majority		37,927	17.5	+6.0
Turnout		217,434	38.5	+6.3
Labour hold		Swing		

European Parliament election, 1994: Yorkshire West
Party	Candidate	Votes	%	±%
Labour	Barry Seal	90,652	53.5	+3.5
Conservative	Richard Booth	42,455	25.0	−7.5
Liberal Democrats	Charles Bidwell	20,452	12.1	+7.6
New Britain	Raymond Pearson	8,027	4.7	New
Green	Colin Harris	7,154	4.2	−8.8
Natural Law	David Whitley	894	0.5	New
Majority		48,197	28.5	+11.0
Turnout		169,634	34.6	−3.9
Labour hold		Swing		
