= Rebecca Taylor (politician) =

British health researcher and Liberal Democrat politician

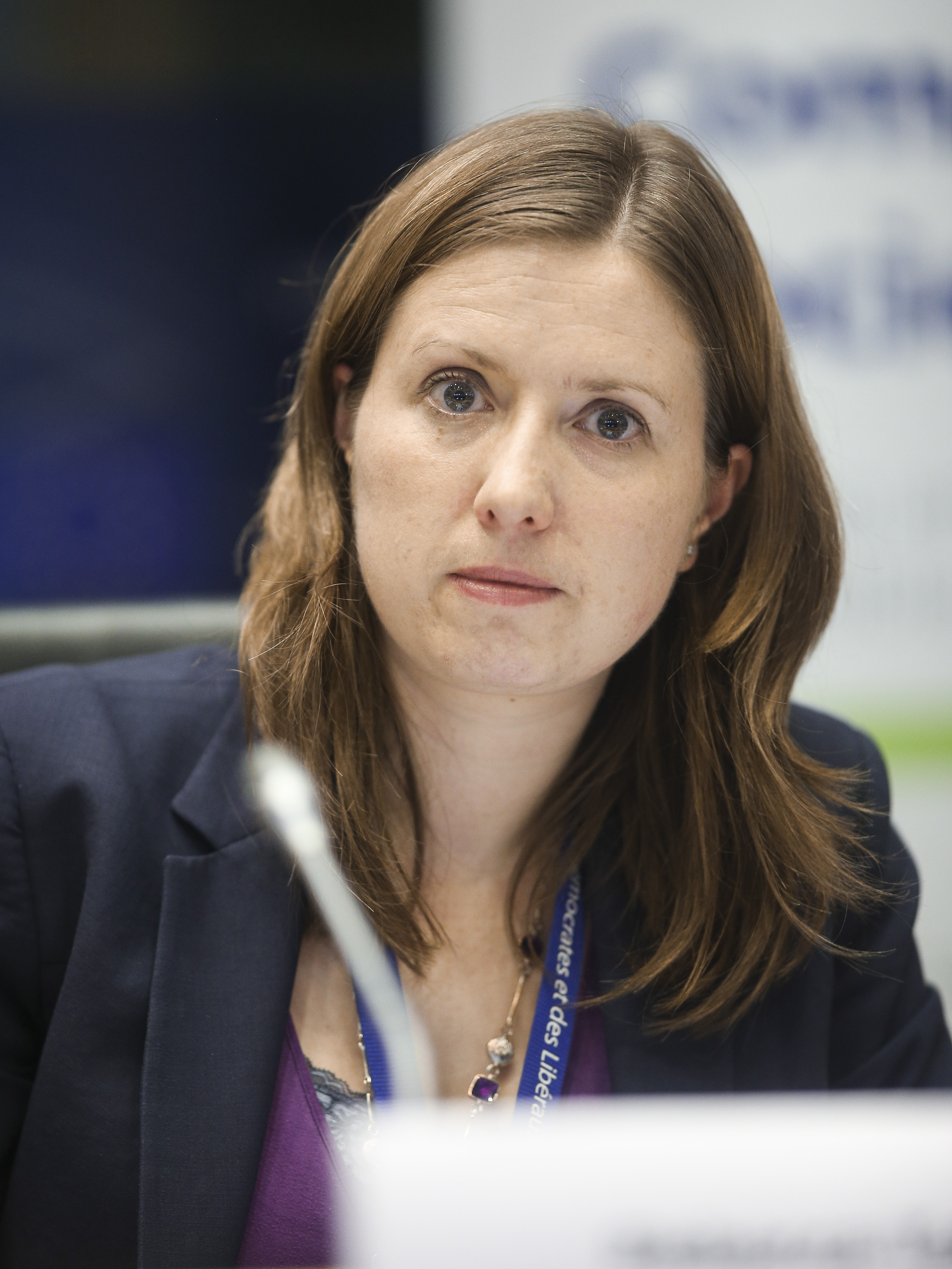
- Taylor in 2013

Member of the European Parliament for Yorkshire and the Humber
- In office 8 March 2012 – 2 July 2014
- Preceded by: Diana Wallis
- Succeeded by: Mike Hookem

Personal details
- Born: Rebecca Elizabeth Taylor; 28 August 1975 (age 51) Todmorden, England
- Party: Liberal Democrat
- Education: University of Leeds (BA); University of Kent (MA); King's College London (MPH)
- Occupation: Politician
- Website: http://www.rebeccataylor.eu http://rebeccataylormep.blogspot.co.uk/

Rebecca Elizabeth Taylor (born 10 August 1975) is a British health researcher and Liberal Democrat politician, who was a Member of the European Parliament (MEP) for Yorkshire and the Humber from 2012 to 2014.

== Early life and education ==
Taylor was born in Todmorden, a market town in the Upper Calder Valley in Calderdale, West Yorkshire. Her father, Michael Taylor, was the leader of the Liberal Democrat group on Calderdale Metropolitan Borough Council and her mother, Elisabeth Wilson, was the Lib Dem candidate for Halifax in the 2010 general election, placing third with 8,335 votes (19.1%).

Taylor has a BA in Japanese and Management Studies (1997) from the University of Leeds, an MA in International Relations (2001) from the University of Kent. She then began working in health policy research and earned a Master in Public Health (2012) from King's College London.

== Political career ==
Taylor contested the European Parliament constituency of Yorkshire and the Humber in the 2009 election. Third on the list of Lib Dem candidates, her party only received enough votes to elect the first candidate on the list, incumbent MEP Diana Wallis. Taylor then stood for election to the Parliamentary constituency of Rotherham in the 2010 general election. She came third with 5,994 votes (16%).

In June 2012, Taylor was appointed to the European Parliament to replace Diana Wallis, who resigned after almost 13 years in office. Wallis had been due to be succeeded by her husband and Communications Manager Stewart Arnold, who had been second on the list of Lib Dem candidates for the seat in the 2009 election, but declined the appointment after pressure from within the party due to complaints of nepotism. Arnold then went on to found the Yorkshire Party. Taylor, who was third on the list, was appointed instead. Taylor was not a candidate for the seat in the 2014 election. She instead contested the Parliamentary constituency of Morley and Outwood in the 2015 general election, finishing fourth with 1,426 votes (3%).
