= Barry Seal (politician) =

British politician (1937–2025)

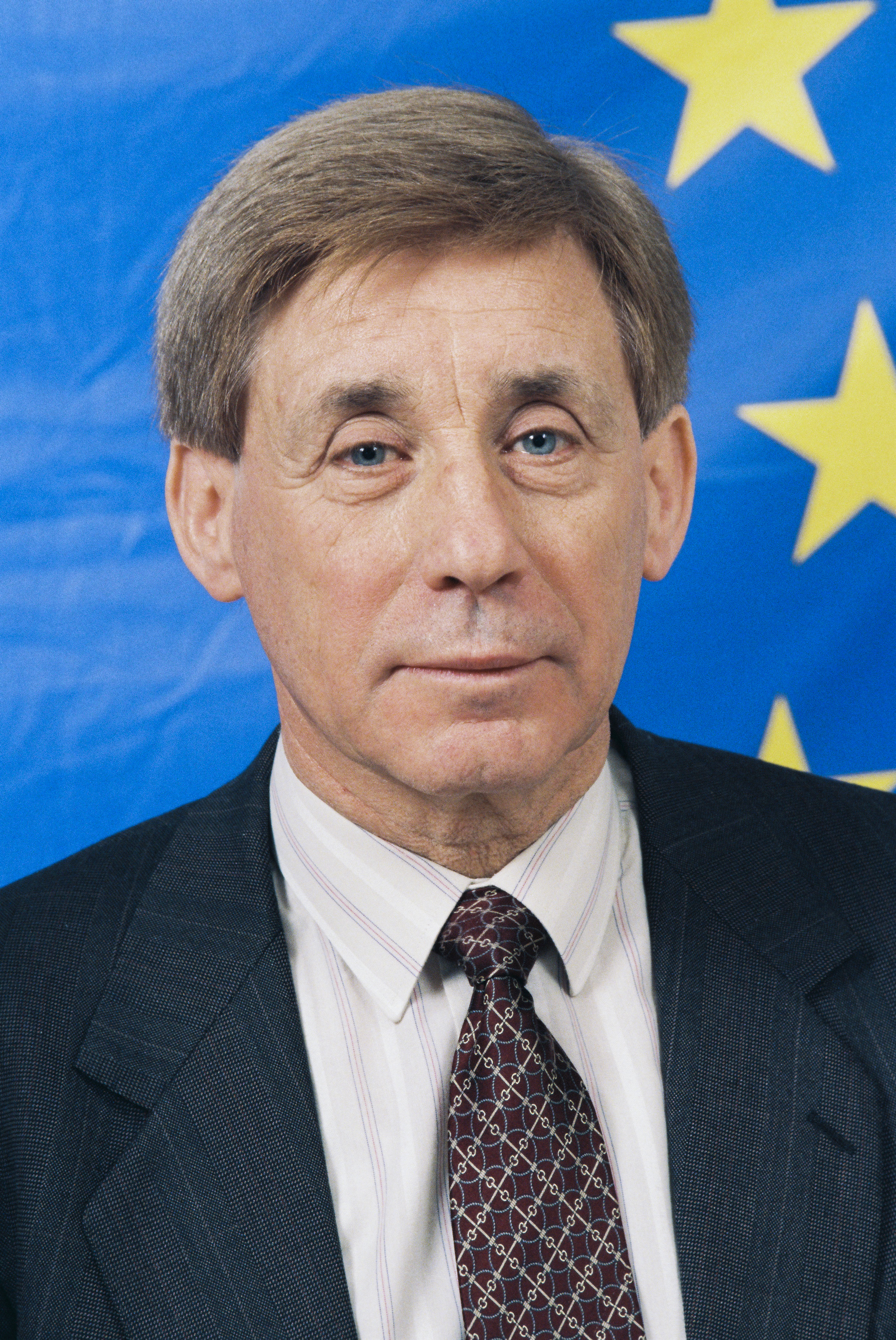
Seal in 1989

Barry Herbert Seal (28 October 1937 – 17 September 2025) was a British Labour Party politician who served in the European Parliament.

== Life and career ==
Born in Halifax, West Yorkshire on 28 October 1937, Seal was educated at Heath Grammar School, the University of Bradford, and the European Business School in Fontainebleau. He worked as a chemical engineer, then as a computer consultant and lecturer.

Seal became active in the Labour Party, serving on Bradford City Council from 1971 until 1979. At the October 1974 United Kingdom general election, he unsuccessfully contested Harrogate.

He was Member of the European Parliament (MEP) for the single-member seat of Yorkshire West from 1979 to 1999. He stood unsuccessfully for election to the new multi-member seat of Yorkshire and the Humber in the 1999 European elections.

Seal served as Leader of the Labour MEPs from 1988 until 1989, and he served a term as Chair of the Economic and Monetary Committee and time as President of the Parliaments delegation to the USA. In 2002 he became Chairman of Kirklees Primary Care NHS trust and in 2007 became Chairman of Bradford District Care Trust.

Seal died from acute myeloid leukaemia on 17 September 2025, at the age of 87.

Party political offices
Preceded by David Martin	Leader of the European Parliamentary Labour Party; 1988–1989	Succeeded by Glyn Ford
