= Cleveland (European Parliament constituency) =

Former European Parliament constituency

- European Parliament constituency
- Boundary within North East England (1979-1984)
- Member state: United Kingdom
- Created: 1979
- Dissolved: 1984
- MEPs: 1

Cleveland was a European Parliament constituency covering Cleveland and parts of North Yorkshire in England.

Prior to its uniform adoption of proportional representation in 1999, the United Kingdom used first-past-the-post for the European elections in England, Scotland, and Wales. The European Parliament constituencies used under that system were smaller than the later regional constituencies and only had one Member of the European Parliament each.

The seat consisted of the Westminster Parliament constituencies of Cleveland and Whitby, Hartlepool, Middlesbrough, Redcar, Richmond (Yorkshire), Scarborough, Stockton-on-Tees, and Thornaby. In 1984, almost all the seat became part of the new Cleveland and Yorkshire North constituency.

== Members of the European Parliament ==
Elected	Name	Party
1979	Sir Peter Vanneck	Conservative

== Results ==
European Parliament election, 1979: Cleveland
Party	Candidate	Votes	%	±%
Conservative	Sir Peter Vanneck	76,514	50.6	
Labour	Ernest Wistrich	51,688	34.1	
Liberal	Michael Ford Pitts	18,125	12.0	
Independent	S. C. Hill	4.960	3.3	
Majority		24,826	16.5	
Turnout		151,287	28.2	
Conservative win (new seat)				
