= Diana Wallis =

British politician

Diana Wallis FCIL
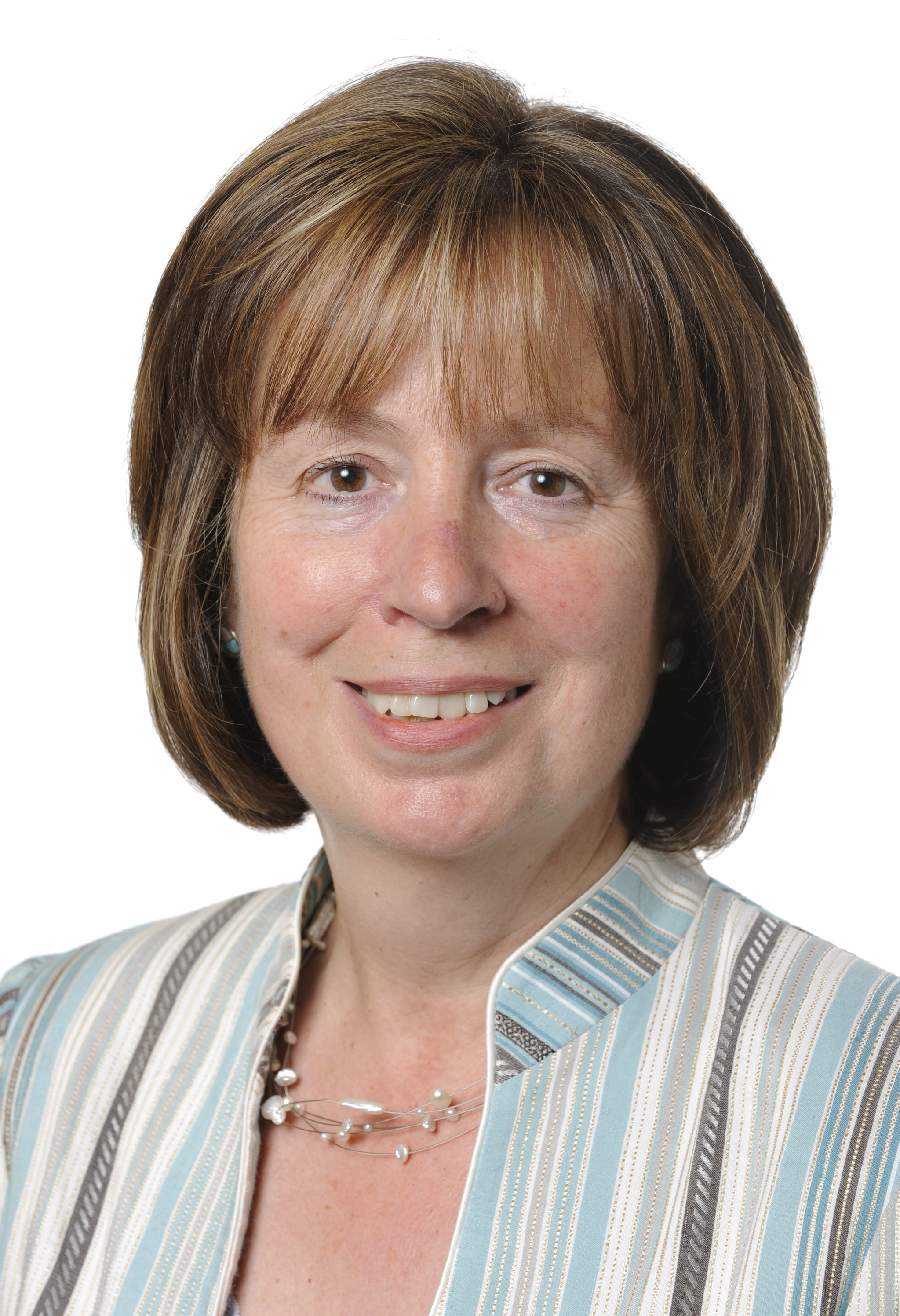

Member of the European Parliament for Yorkshire and the Humber
- In office 10 June 1999 – 8 March 2012
- Preceded by: New constituency
- Succeeded by: Rebecca Taylor

Personal details
- Born: 28 June 1954 (age 72) Hitchin, Hertfordshire, England
- Party: Change UK (2019); Yorkshire Party (2015–2019); Liberal Democrat (past)
- Spouse: Stewart Arnold
- Education: North London Polytechnic; University of Kent
- Occupation: Politician and lawyer
- Profession: Lawyer
- Website: https://dianawallis.wordpress.com/

Diana Paulette Wallis, FCIL (born 28 June 1954 in Hitchin, Hertfordshire) is a British former Liberal Democrat Member of the European Parliament (MEP) for Yorkshire and the Humber. Wallis was first elected in 1999 and re-elected in 2004 and in 2009. She resigned her seat in January 2012 and went on to pursue academic, legal and mediation-related activities.

On 6 September 2013, Wallis was elected President of the European Law Institute, an independent non-profit organisation established to initiate, conduct and facilitate research, make recommendations and provide practical guidance in the field of European legal development with a goal of enhancing the European legal integration. She was re-elected in 2015 for a second term, which lasted until 2017.

Wallis contested Haltemprice and Howden as a Yorkshire Party candidate in the 2015 and 2017 UK General Elections and subsequently left that party in March 2019.

She later joined Change UK and was selected as the lead candidate for Yorkshire and the Humber at the 2019 European Parliament elections.

== Early career ==
Wallis read History at North London Polytechnic, graduating as a BA. She further studied at the University of Kent, where she obtained the degree of Master of Arts (MA), Liege, Zurich and Chester. Before being elected to the European Parliament she practised for over 15 years as a litigation lawyer (solicitor), mainly in London where she developed a European cross-border practice. Wallis was lecturer at the University of Hull in European business law from 1995 to 1999. Wallis was also a Councillor on Humberside County Council and deputy leader of the East Riding Unitary Council from 1994 to 1999.

== Member of the European Parliament ==
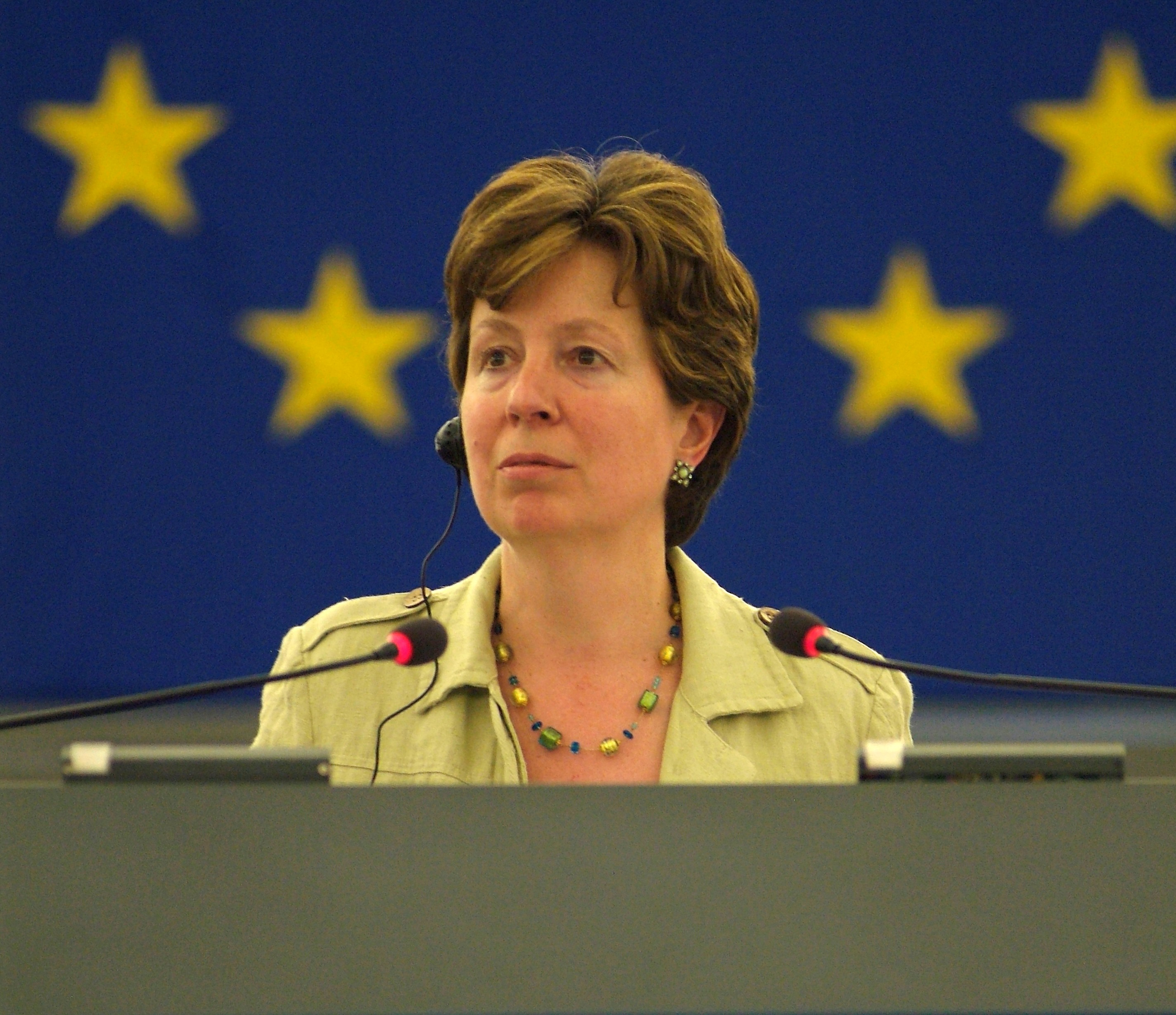
Wallis as Vice-President chairing a parliamentary session

Wallis was elected Member of the European Parliament on three successive occasions in 1999, 2004 and 2009 (5th, 6th and 7th legislative terms of the European Parliament). During her tenure she held a number of senior positions and authored a large number of parliamentary reports.

=== Vice-Presidency of the European Parliament ===
In 2007, Diana Wallis became the first British female of any political persuasion in twenty years to be elected to the post of Vice President of the European Parliament, as well as being the first British Liberal Democrat to do so. After the change into the sixth legislative term in 2009, the Parliament's plenary re-elected her to the position for a second term.

As a member of Parliament's Bureau, comprising the President, Vice-Presidents and Quaestors, her portfolio focused on transparency and access to documents (meaning under the Parliament's internal rules that she signed off on appeals for access to the Parliament's documents under Regulation 1049/2001), the Arctic and high north, Question Time (jointly with another Vice-President) and the Academy of European Law based in Trier (Germany). Her further duties as Vice-President included chairing the plenary sessions of the European Parliament and replacing the Parliament's President in international fora (Arctic and high north) or at official events. Wallis notably led the call for an official day to commemorate the Srebrenica genocide of 1995 and attended the commemoration in Potocari, Bosnia and Herzegovina, on behalf of the European Parliament.

As Vice-President for transparency, she led the Parliament's lengthy negotiations with the European Commission led in 2011 to the first Transparency Register for interest representatives seeking to influence decision-making of the EU institutions (commonly referred to as lobbyists), together with a Code of Conduct. The Transparency Register has grown to include a very large number of registered entities and individuals (over 10,000 in total) and is managed jointly by the European Parliament's and the European Commission's services. Furthermore, she opened up the directly-elected Parliament's archives from the time of its first President (1979), Simone Veil, in her presence in Paris on 23 March 2008.

As Vice-President she took part in two key working groups whose aim it was to reform, on the one hand the functioning of the Parliament's plenary, and on the other hand, the Parliament more generally.

=== Leadership of national delegation ===
As a Member of the ALDE European-level political group in the European Parliament, Wallis was leader of the Liberal Democrats in the European Parliament 2000–2004, and then from June 2006 to January 2007.

=== Committee on Legal Affairs / Committee on Internal Market and Consumer Protection (previously merged) ===
During her membership of more than ten years in the JURI and IMCO committees, Wallis led work on behalf of her political group ("coordinator"), and was responsible as rapporteur for a number of pieces of legislation passing through the Parliament, including the "Brussels I" and "Rome II" Regulations which are two key pillars of the European Union's private international law, the Regulation on Trade in Seal Products, the Regulation establishing the law applicable to maintenance obligations. She was also rapporteur on a number of non-legislative issues including the role of national judges in the EU's legal system, e-commerce, e-publishing, collective redress, e-Justice, judicial training, mediation, consumer law, and European contract law.

=== Committee on Petitions and Inquiry into crisis at Equitable Life ===
Wallis was also a full member of the Petitions Committee where she regularly authored reports on the application of EU law across the Member States and the European Commission's role in monitoring these common rules. As Rapporteur to the Committee of Inquiry into the Equitable Life affair, she is author of a report which was approved by a large majority in the Parliament and which made a number of recommendations prior to the 2008 financial crisis, including the "further strengthening of prudential supervisory and regulatory standards throughout the Union", in order to avoid such a situation recurring in the future.

Following the entry into force of the Treaty of Lisbon on 1 December 2009, Wallis played a key role as co-rapporteur in the setting-up of the European Citizen's Initiative, which allows a minimum of 1 million citizens from a significant number of Member States to request a legislative initiative from the European Commission.

=== Delegation for relations with Switzerland, Iceland, Norway ===
Until 2007, she was chair of the delegation for relations with Switzerland, Iceland and Norway and the European Economic Area (EEA) Joint Parliamentary Committee and remained a full member of that Committee during the remainder of her parliamentary career.

=== Further parliamentary work ===
Throughout her time as an MEP, Wallis has authored 28 full reports excluding purely technical ones, and 16 opinions, asked 40 written and oral questions of the Commission and Council (during Parliament's 2004–2009 term). She successfully piloted two written declarations until their adoption by the Parliament – one in 2007 on the European Emergency Number 1-1-2 (which achieved 530 MEP signatures, which is the record so far), and one in 2008 on Emergency cooperation in recovering missing children.

=== Bid for presidency of European Parliament and resignation ===
On 30 November 2011 Wallis announced her intention to stand for the position of President of the European Parliament as an independent candidate on the basis of nomination by 40 MEPs from different political groups. Other candidates were Martin Schulz and Nirj Deva. Martin Schulz was elected on 17 January 2012, as anticipated, and pursuant to the agreement between certain political groups, with Wallis obtaining 141 votes.

On 19 January 2012, two days after failing to become the Parliament president, Wallis announced her resignation, which took effect from 31 January 2012. Wallis had been due to be succeeded by her husband Stewart Arnold who was also employed by her as a Parliamentary Assistant, who had been second on the list of Liberal Democrat candidates for the seat in the 2009 election, but he declined the appointment and eventually went on to found the Yorkshire Party with Richard Carter. Rebecca Taylor, who was third on the list, was appointed instead.

== Past and present non-parliamentary activities ==
=== Democracy and gender equality ===
Wallis has a particular interest in issues of direct democracy and in 2001 she co-founded the Initiatives and Referendums Institute - Europe (IRI-Europe) whose aim it is to assist modern direct democracy across the globe. In March 2006, she hosted an IRI-Europe conference in Brussels to discuss different approaches across Europe towards the issue of direct democracy and in particular the campaign for introducing a citizens' initiative at the European level. She is a board member of the Initiative & Referendum Institute Europe. This is a think tank which has a particular interest in all issues relating to direct democracy.

Before and after the entry into force of the Treaty of Lisbon, she played an active role in shaping and implementing the European Citizen's Initiative.

Wallis meeting Commission President Barroso (2009)

Wallis has been a vocal proponent of increasing the share of women in decision-making roles. In the run-up to the appointment of the second Barroso Commission in 2009, she co-launched a campaign "send2women" with the aim of securing at least two women among the top positions in the EU institutions which were rotating that year, and the ambition to increase female representation in the EU institutions overall. In this framework she met Commission President Jose-Manuel Barroso in a bid to increase gender equality within the College of Commissioners.

=== Legal issues, mediation and arbitration ===
- On 6 September 2013, Wallis was elected President of the European Law Institute, an independent non-profit organisation established to initiate, conduct and facilitate research, make recommendations and provide practical guidance in the field of European legal development with a goal of enhancing the European legal integration. She was re-elected in 2015 for a second term, which lasted until 2017.
- since 2012, Trustee of the Academy of European Law, Trier (ERA, Trier) which provides training to legal practitioners throughout Europe.
- member of the board of directors of the International Mediation Institute.
- from 2017, member of the board of trustees of BIICL.
- Senior lecturer at the Law School at the University of Hull (her local University where she previously taught part-time in the 1990s developing a module on Comparative Law for joint law and language undergraduates).
- Honorary associate of the Centre for Socio-legal Studies at the University of Oxford.
- since 2012, Member of the UK Law Society's EU Committee.
- Since 2015, Commercial Mediator Centre for Effective Dispute Resolution (CEDR) accredited Mediator and a Member of the Charter Institute of Arbitrators;
- Since 2012, Independent arbitrator and chair of Joint Committee on Non-Print Legal Deposit Post created pursuant to Non-Print Legal Deposit Regulations 2013

=== Linguistic activities ===
From 2002 to 2009, Wallis was the President of the UK Institute of Translation and Interpreting.

Wallis speaks French and German and some Icelandic.

=== Health-related campaigns ===
Wallis is a Member of the European Emergency Number Association (EENA) Advisory Board

She completed the London Marathon on 26 April 2009 in a time of 5 hours 22 minutes, running in aid of the World Endometriosis Research Foundation.

== Publications ==
- Wallis, Diana; Arnold, Stewart; Jones, Ben Idris (2002). Forgotten Enlargement: Future EU Relations with Iceland, Norway and Switzerland. London: Centre for Reform. ISBN 1-902622-39-1.
- D. Wallis, Expectations for the Final Common Frame of Reference, ERA Forum, 2008
- D. Wallis, Governing Common Seas; From a Baltic Strategy to an Arctic Policy Journal of Baltic Studies, 2011
- D.Wallis (ed), European Property Rights and Wrongs, Connexia, 2001
- Wallis D, ‘Foreword’ Hardacre A, How the EU Institutions Work and How to Work with the EU Institutions, John Harper Publishing, June 2011
- Wallis D (ed), The Spitsbergen Treaty: Multilateral Governance in the Arctic (Alliance of Liberals and Democrats for Europe Applied International Law Network 2011)
- Wallis D, ‘Foreword’ in Schonewille M and Schonewille F (eds), The Variegated Landscape of Mediation: A Comparative Study of Mediation Regulation and Practices in Europe and the World (Eleven International Publishing 2014)
- Wallis D, Common European Sales Law and the Media: Reduction of Complexity or Scaremongering?’ in Lehmann M (ed), Common European Sales Law meets Reality (Sellier 2014)
- Wallis, D. (2015). &#39;Looking for the ‘Justice’ in EU civil and private law?; Verfassungsblog, 3 July 2015.
- Wallis D, European rights: there is no going backwards (LSE BrexitVote blog, 14 April 2016) http://blogs.lse.ac.uk/brexitvote/2016/04/14/european-rights-there- is-no-going-backwards/ accessed 16 May 2016
- Diana Wallis, On the Importance of Sharing National Law so as to Shape Future Trans-National Legal Solutions, The Italian Law Journal Vol. 02 – No. 01 (2016)
- Diana Wallis, Designing a Holistic and Justice Based Approach to Mediation and Consumer ADR in the EU in B. Vadell, M. Lorenzo (eds) Electronic Mediation: A Comparative Approach, ( Comares 2017 )
- D. Wallis, Arctic Law and Governance, Timo Koivurova, QUI Tianbao, Sebastien Duyck and Tapio Nykånen (Eds), Book Review, European Journal of Comparative Law, Winter 2017
