= Mike Hookem =

Former Deputy Leader of the UK Independence Party

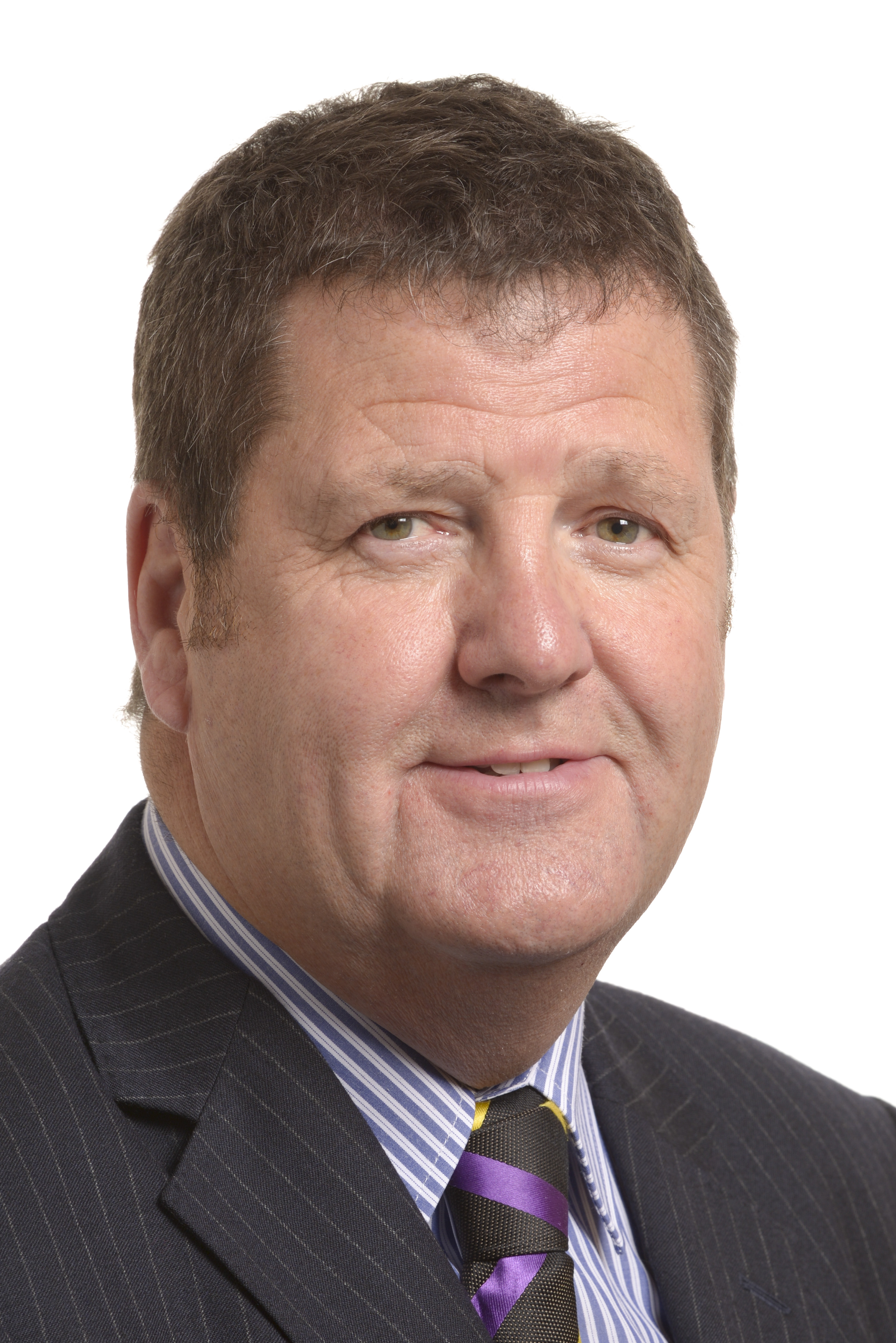

Chairman of the Alliance for Democracy and Freedom
- In office 2020–2024
- Leader: Ernie Warrender; Teck Khong
- Preceded by: New office
- Succeeded by: Ernie Warrender

Deputy Leader of the UK Independence Party
- In office 27 February 2018 – 24 May 2019
- Leader: Gerard Batten
- Preceded by: Margot Parker
- Succeeded by: Pat Mountain

UKIP Spokesperson for Defence
- In office 17 April 2019 – 12 August 2019
- Leader: Gerard Batten; Richard Braine
- Preceded by: Ray Finch
- Succeeded by: Ben Walker
- In office 24 July 2014 – 29 November 2016
- Leader: Nigel Farage; Diane James
- Preceded by: Gerard Batten
- Succeeded by: Bill Etheridge

UKIP Spokesperson for Fisheries and Veterans Affairs
- In office 29 November 2016 – 12 August 2019
- Leader: Paul Nuttall; Henry Bolton; Gerard Batten; Richard Braine
- Preceded by: Ray Finch
- Succeeded by: Jonathon Riley

Member of the European Parliament for Yorkshire and the Humber
- In office 1 July 2014 – 1 July 2019
- Preceded by: Rebecca Taylor
- Succeeded by: Jake Pugh

Personal details
- Born: Michael Hookem; 9 October 1953 (age 73) Kingston upon Hull, England
- Party: Alliance for Democracy and Freedom (since 2020)
- Other political affiliations: Labour (1982–2008); UKIP (2008–2019)

Michael Hookem (born 9 October 1953) is a British politician who served as Member of the European Parliament (MEP) for Yorkshire and the Humber from 2014 to 2019.

A former member of the UK Independence Party (UKIP), Hookem served as UKIP's Deputy Leader under Gerard Batten from February 2018 until his resignation in May 2019 to run for the leadership. He also served as Spokesperson for Fisheries and Veterans Affairs from 2016 to 2019, and as Spokesperson for Defence in 2019 and previously from 2014 to 2016.

== Early life ==
Hookem grew up in the fishing community in the east of Kingston upon Hull, and left school at 15. His father worked on the docks. Hookem enlisted in the Royal Air Force at the age of 17, and served for four years.

After working in various trades he rejoined the military, serving in the Royal Engineers as a TA Commando Engineer for nine years.

== UKIP politics ==
Hookem voted for the Labour Party until he became disillusioned with what he considered "a criminal Labour government". In response to his disillusionment with Labour, Hookem joined UKIP in 2008, after having for years been a Labour member.

He stood as the UKIP candidate in Kingston upon Hull East in the 2010 general election, and finished fourth with 2,745 votes (8%).

=== Member of the European Parliament (2014–2019) ===
Hookem was elected in 2014 to the European Parliament. He had served as UKIP's regional chairman for Yorkshire and North Lincolnshire until that election. He was replaced as chairman by Judith Morris from July 2014.

On 6 October 2016, Hookem was involved in a fight with fellow UKIP MEP Steven Woolfe during a UKIP meeting at the European Parliament in Strasbourg. Hookem said he had not punched Woolfe, but did admit to a "scuffle" with him and that he acted in self-defence. The altercation was an outgrowth of a party meeting to discuss news reports that Woolfe was in talks about defecting to the Conservative Party. Hookem said Woolfe "took exception" to his comment about Woolfe turning his leadership application paperwork late. Hookem was asked if he would accept a suspension and Hookem said: "If they suspend me, yes. By our rules if they suspend me they have to suspend Steven Woolfe".

Hookem stood as UKIP's candidate for Great Grimsby in the 2017 general election, finishing third with 1,647 votes (4.6%), losing his deposit.

Following the election of Henry Bolton as leader of UKIP, Hookem was appointed assistant deputy leader as well as UKIP spokesman on fisheries and on veterans affairs. He stood down as the party's assistant deputy leader on 22 January 2018 after Bolton refused to resign as leader following a vote of no confidence in him from UKIP's National Executive Committee the previous day.

Following the party's split from the EFDD Group led by UKIP's former leader, Nigel Farage, while UKIP leader Gerard Batten and Stuart Agnew joined the Europe of Nations and Freedom group.

On 24 May 2019, a day after voting concluded for the 2019 European elections, Hookem announced his resignation as deputy leader of UKIP. In a statement, he said: "I believe Ukip always has been and always should be a libertarian party that encourages and promotes common-sense policies with a broad electoral appeal. However, under Mr Batten's leadership, and despite my appeals, Ukip has been derailed from this objective. Mr Batten's policy direction and associations have given the mainstream media the ammunition to label our party 'extreme' and 'far-right', accusations I do not believe to be true." Hookem stated his intention to run in the then upcoming leadership election, after Batten announced his own resignation as party leader earlier that month. When the European election results were declared, it was revealed that UKIP had suffered a dramatic collapse in electoral support, largely due to the emergence of Farage's new Brexit Party who won the most seats. As a result, neither Hookem nor any of the other UKIP candidates were returned as MEPs. Richard Braine was announced as UKIP's new leader on 10 August 2019, after winning the leadership contest, with Hookem having come a distant fourth with 13% of all votes cast.

=== Subsequent activity ===
After leaving UKIP, Hookem helped to found the Alliance for Democracy and Freedom (ADF) in 2020, later becoming the party’s Chairman.

== Elections contested ==
UK Parliament

Date of election	Constituency	Party	Votes	%	Result
2010 general election	Kingston upon Hull East	UKIP	2,745	8.0	Not elected
2015 general election	Wentworth and Dearne	UKIP	10,733	24.9	Not elected
2017 general election	Great Grimsby	UKIP	1,648	4.6	Not elected

European Parliament elections

Year	Region	Party	Votes	%	Result	Notes
2014	Yorkshire and the Humber	UKIP	403,630	31.1	Elected	Multi member constituencies; party list
2019	Yorkshire and the Humber	UKIP	56,100	4.4	Not elected	Multi member constituencies; party list
