= Robert Battersby =

British soldier, linguist, diplomat and politician (1924–2002)

Robert Christopher Battersby
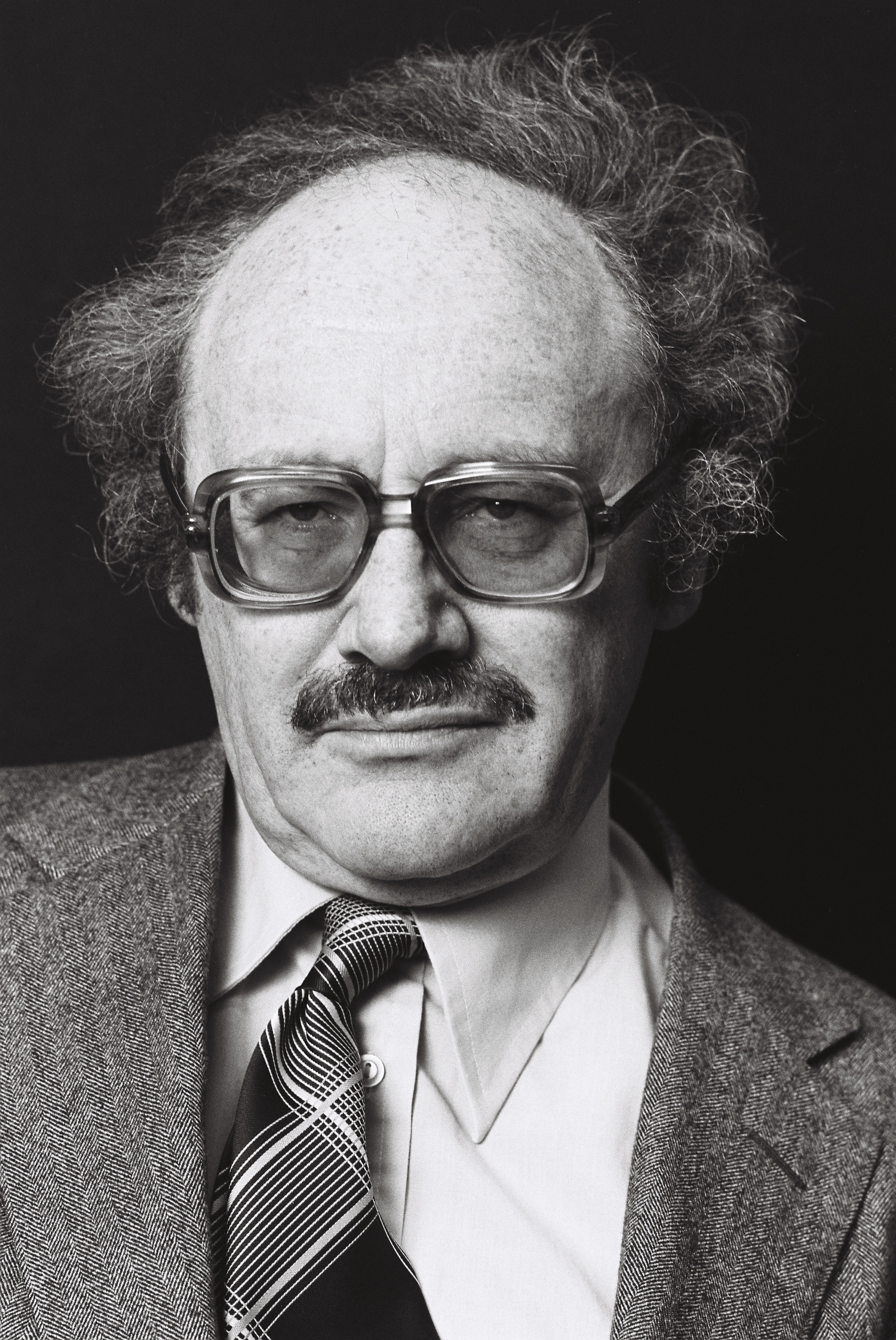

Member of the European Parliament
- In office 7 June 1979 – 15 June 1989
- Constituency: Humberside

Personal details
- Born: 14 December 1924 Sheffield
- Died: 30 September 2002 (aged 77)
- Party: Conservative
- Occupation: Member of the European Parliament

Robert Christopher Battersby KSG CBE (14 December 1924 – 30 September 2002) was a British soldier, linguist, diplomat and politician, who served as a Member of the European Parliament (MEP) for the constituency of Humberside between 1979 and 1989. He was a prominent member of the Conservative Party.

Parliament of the United Kingdom
New constituency	Member of Parliament for Humberside; 1979 – 1989 election	Peter Crampton
