= Brian Key =

British politician

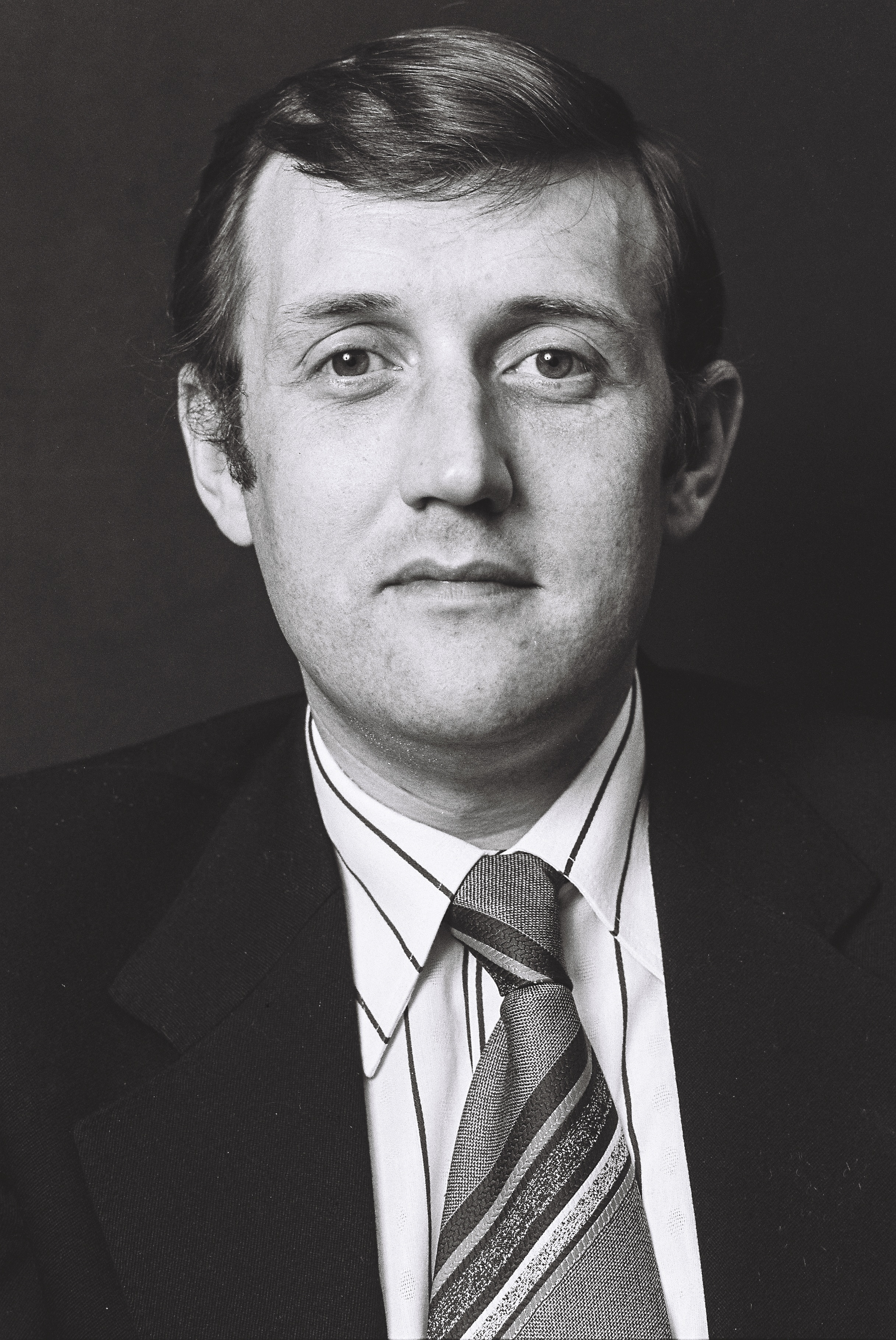
- European Parliament portrait

Member of the European Parliament for Yorkshire South
- In office 1979–1984
- Preceded by: Position established
- Succeeded by: Norman West

Personal details
- Born: 20 September 1947 Darfield, South Yorkshire, UK
- Died: 20 January 2016 (aged 68)
- Party: Labour
- Spouse: Lynn Ambler
- Education: Wath Grammar School University of Liverpool
- Occupation: Local Government Officer
- Profession: School auditor

Brian Michael Key (20 September 1947 – 20 January 2016) was a British Labour Party politician from Barnsley in South Yorkshire. He notably served as the Member of the European Parliament (MEP) for Yorkshire South from 1979 to 1984, having contested the first-ever U.K. election for the European Parliament.

He additionally served on the Barnsley Metropolitan Borough Council before and following his tenure in the European Parliament.

== Early life and education ==
Key was born on 20 September 1947 in Darfield, South Yorkshire. He was educated at Wath Grammar School from 1958 to 1965. He went on to study PPE (Philosophy, Politics, and Economics) at the University of Liverpool. During his time at university, Key was a contemporary of future journalist Jon Snow.

== Political career ==
Key was elected to Barnsley Metropolitan Borough Council in 1973, where he served for six years until his election to the European Parliament. During his tenure on Barnsley Metropolitan Borough Council, Key served as chair of the Labour Group and as a member of the council's education committee.

=== Member of the European Parliament (MEP) ===
In 1979, Key was elected as the Member of the European Parliament (MEP) for Yorkshire South in the first-ever election for the European Parliament in the U.K. In the subsequent 1984 election, Key was deselected by the Labour Party. Labour candidate Norman West won the seat and succeeded him in the European Parliament.

=== Post-MEP career ===
Before retiring, Key worked as a local government officer and school auditor. Between 2011 and 2015, Key represented his home village of Darfield on Barnsley Metropolitan Borough Council, but chose to retire prior to the 2015 local elections.

== Death and legacy ==
Soon after retiring as a councillor, Key died at the age of 68 on 20 January 2016. Following his death, Michael Dugher, Labour MP for Barnsley East, paid tribute to Key's legacy, stating that:

"Barnsley has lost one of its finest sons in Brian Key. From the moment I first met Brian, he was incredibly warm and supportive."
