= Norman West =

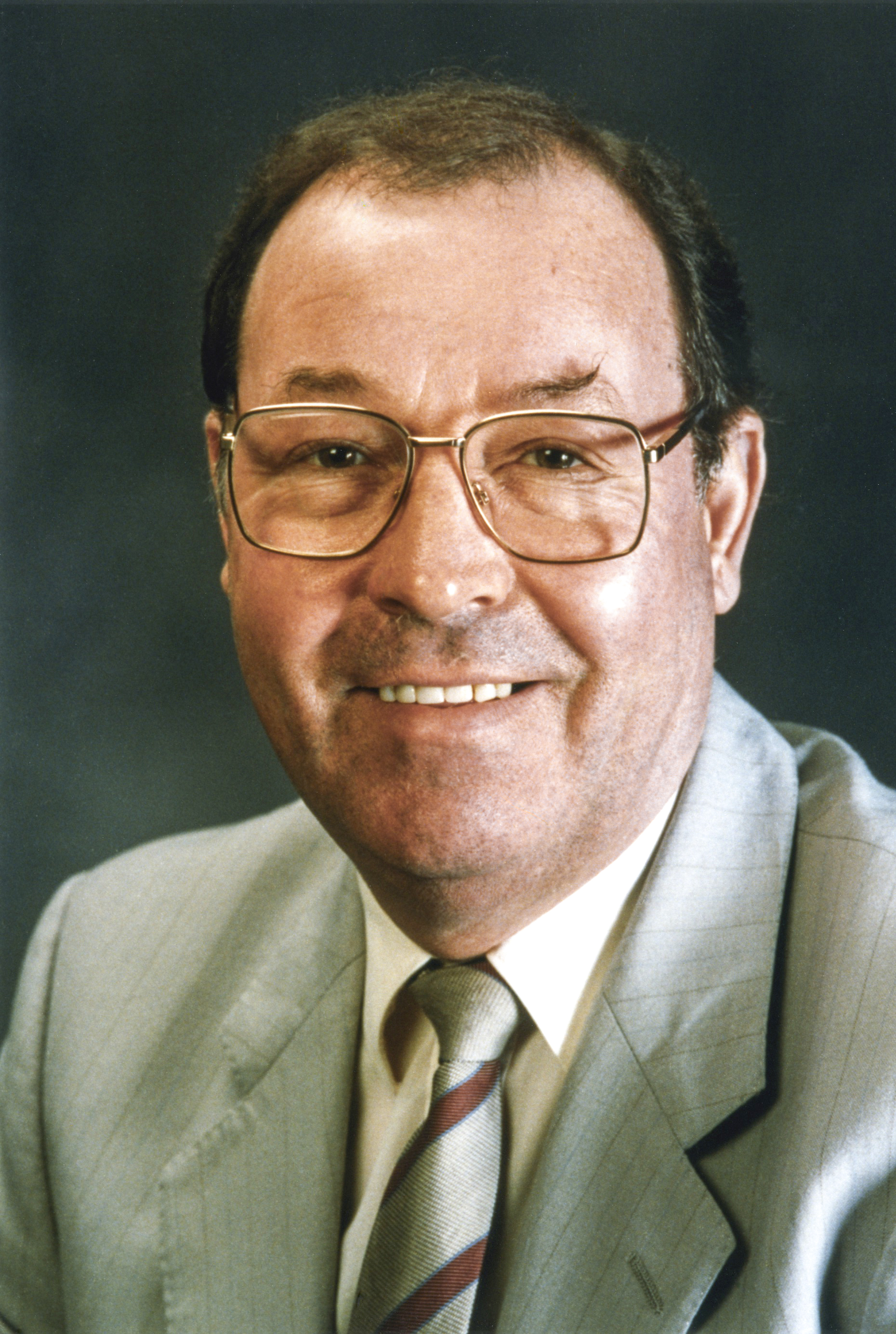
- Official MEP portrait

Member of the European Parliament for Yorkshire South
- In office 14 June 1984 – 1 March 1998
- Preceded by: Brian Key
- Succeeded by: Linda McAvan

Personal details
- Born: 26 November 1935 Worsborough, South Yorkshire, England
- Died: 7 September 2009 (aged 73) Worsborough, South Yorkshire, England
- Party: Labour

Norman West (26 November 1935 – 7 September 2009) was a British politician, coal miner, and trade unionist. A member of the Labour Party, he served as the Member of the European Parliament (MEP) for Yorkshire South from 1984 to 1998.

Prior to this, West was a career coal miner and trade union activist who was elected to the South Yorkshire County Council. He was a member of the Socialist Campaign Group (SCG), a left-wing group within the party.

== Early life and coal mining career ==
West was born in Worsborough near Barnsley, South Yorkshire on 26 November 1935. He studied at Barnsley Grammar School before becoming a coal miner at Barrow Colliery, the local mine in Worsborough. He went on to join the National Union of Mineworkers, and supported Arthur Scargill in his early years.

== Political and trade union career ==
West also became active in the Labour Party, and was elected to South Yorkshire County Council. In the 1984 European Parliament election, he was elected as the Member of the European Parliament (MEP) for Yorkshire South.

During his tenure as an MEP, he supported the UK miners' strike. He was a member of the Socialist Campaign Group. According to The Guardian, West was a "committed internationalist" despite personal "reservations about the case for British membership" in the EU. West stood down as an MEP in 1998, and was succeeded by Linda McAvan in the subsequent by-election.

== Later life and death ==
Following his tenure in the European Parliament, West remained a resident of Worsborough until his death on 7 September 2009. He was survived by his wife Shirley, their two sons, and their four grandchildren.
