= Peter Crampton (politician) =

British Labour Party politician (1932–2011)

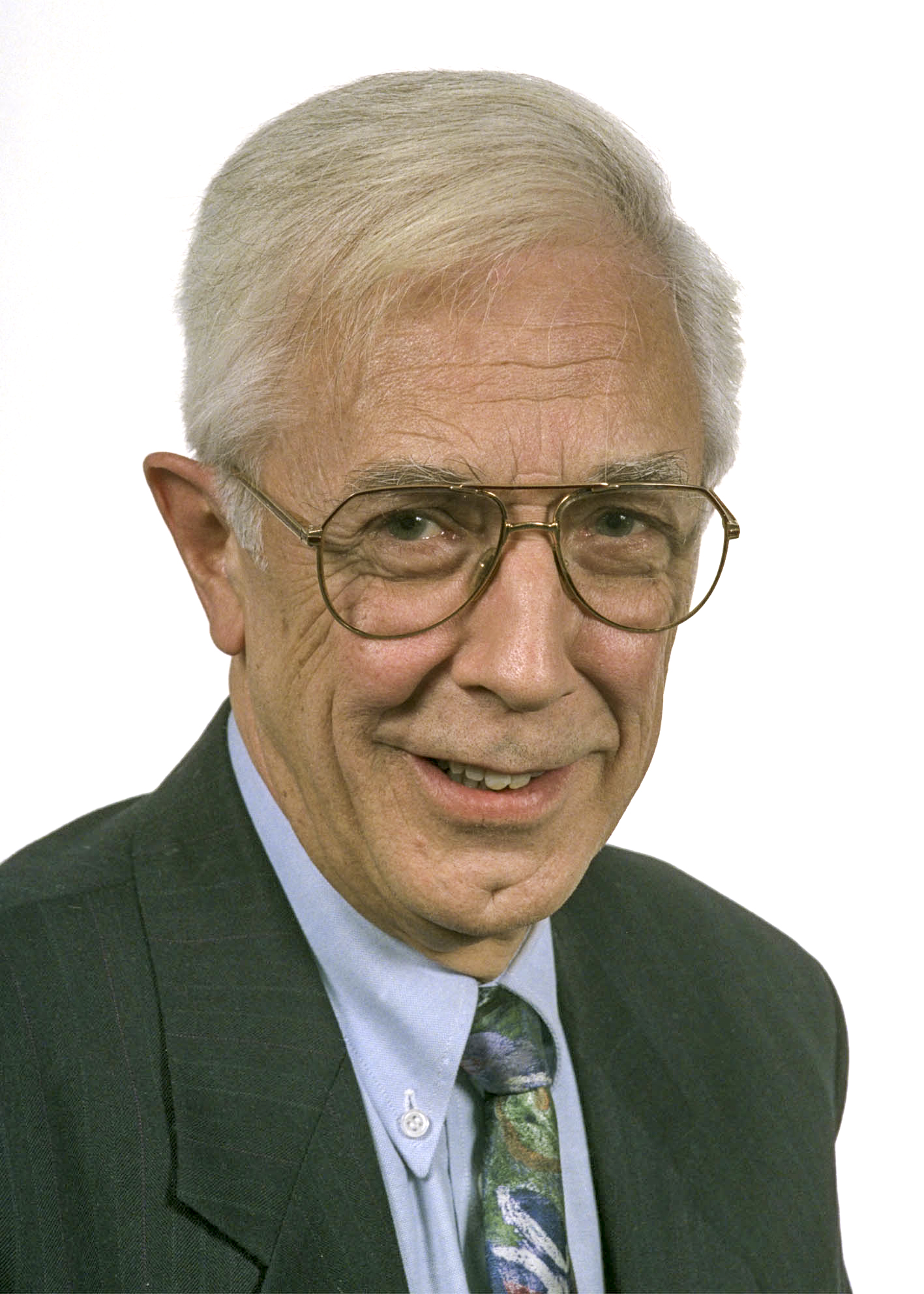
- Crampton in 1994

Member of the European Parliament
- In office 1989 – 20 July 1999
- Preceded by: Robert Battersby
- Succeeded by: Constituency abolished
- Constituency: Humberside

Personal details
- Born: 10 June 1932 Blackpool, United Kingdom
- Party: Labour
- Children: 2 (including Robert)
- Education: University of Nottingham

Peter Crampton (10 June 1932 – 12 July 2011) was a British Labour Party politician who was the Member of the European Parliament (MEP) from 1989 to 1999 representing the Humberside constituency. He was also the father of Times journalist Robert Crampton.

== Biography ==
He was born in Blackpool in 1932 and educated at Blackpool Grammar School and the University of Nottingham. He was a teacher and lecturer of geography. He married a geography teacher from London in 1955. They had two sons, born in 1962 and 1964. After a spell in Solihull, in 1970 the family moved to Hull so he could take up a post at Hull College of Higher Education (now merged into the University of Lincoln). In Hull he was active in Labour politics.

He retired from teaching in 1988 and was briefly a parliamentary researcher for MP Joan Ruddock. He was MEP for the Humberside constituency from 1989 until he stood down at the 1999 election.

In 1995 he was one of 32 MEPs who placed an advertisement in The Guardian opposing the plans of then Labour leader Tony Blair to re-write Clause 4 of the Labour constitution.

Crampton was a socialist, influenced by Methodism. Described in his obituary as a "peace campaigner whose tranquil demeanour masked a ferocious commitment to the cause," he opposed the War in Afghanistan and the Iraq War, and played an active part the Stop the War Coalition. Crampton was also involved in a campaign against the Trident nuclear deterrent.

== Personal life ==
He lived in Hull with his wife. He had two sons, David Crampton (born 1962), and Robert Crampton (born 1964). His brother, E. P. T. Crampton, is an author on religious subjects.

Parliament of the United Kingdom
Preceded by Robert Battersby	Member of Parliament for Humberside; 1989 – 1999 election	Constituency abolished (see Yorkshire and the Humber)
