= Cleveland and Richmond (European Parliament constituency) =

Former European Parliament constituency

- European Parliament constituency
- Boundary within North East England (1994-1999)
- Member state: United Kingdom
- Created: 1994
- Dissolved: 1999
- MEPs: 1

Prior to its uniform adoption of proportional representation in 1999, the United Kingdom used first-past-the-post for the European elections in England, Scotland and Wales. The European Parliament constituencies used under that system were smaller than the later regional constituencies and only had one Member of the European Parliament each.

The constituency of Cleveland and Richmond was one of them.

It consisted of the Westminster Parliament constituencies (on their 1983 boundaries) of Hartlepool, Langbaurgh, Middlesbrough, Redcar, Richmond (Yorks), Stockton North, and Stockton South.

== MEPs ==
Election	Member	Party
1994	David Bowe	Labour

== Election results ==
European Parliament election, 1994: Cleveland and Richmond
Party	Candidate	Votes	%	±%
Labour	David Bowe	103,355	58.7	
Conservative	Robert Goodwill	45,787	26.0	
Liberal Democrats	Brian D. Moore	21,574	12.2	
Green	Ged F. Parr	4,375	2.5	
Natural Law	Richard B. Scott	1,068	0.6	
Majority		57,568	32.7	
Turnout		176,159		
Labour win (new seat)				
