= Peter Vanneck =

British military officer (1922–1999)

Sir Peter Vanneck
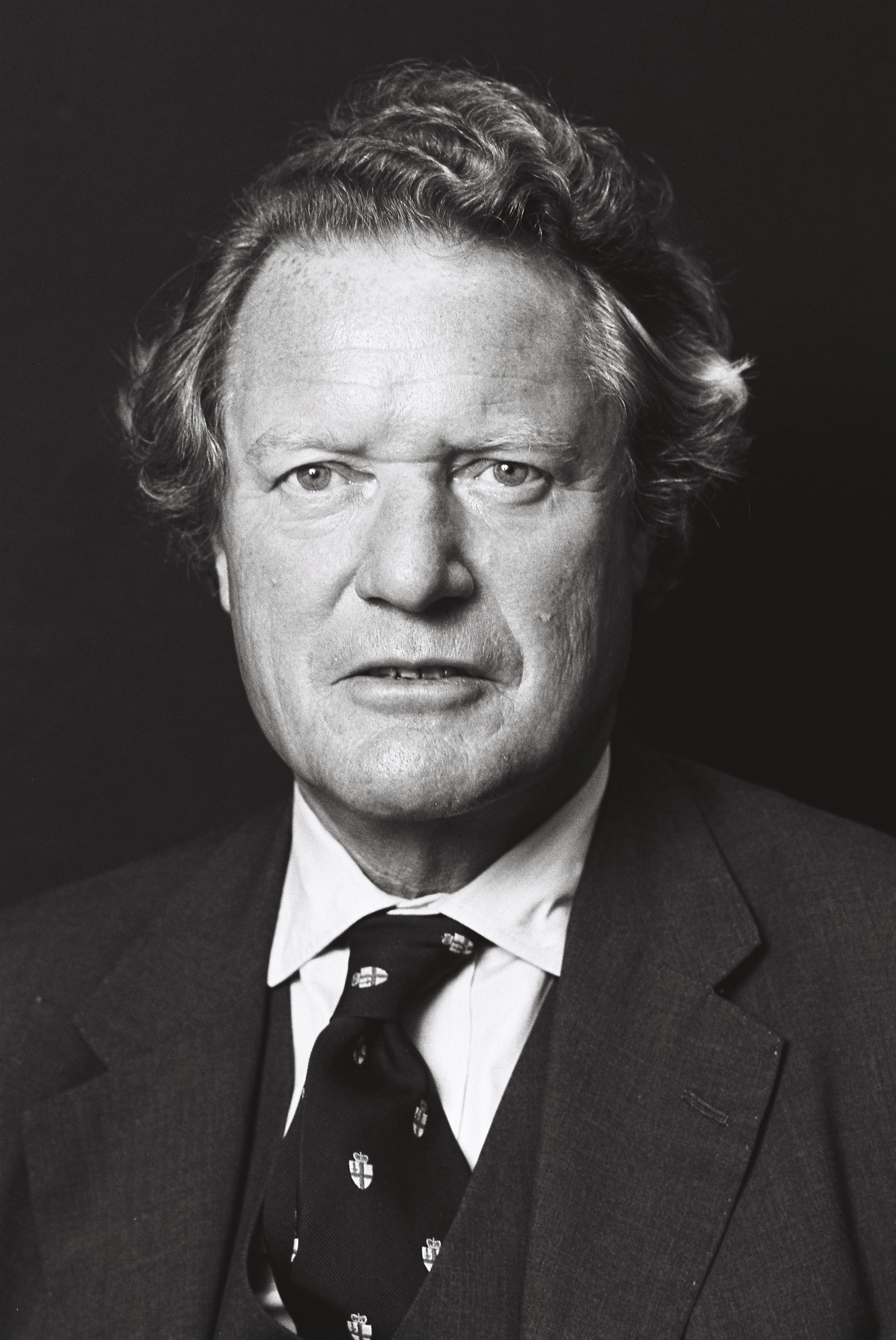
- European Parliament portrait
- Born: Peter Beckford Rutgers Vanneck; 7 January 1922; London
- Died: 2 August 1999 (aged 77); London
- Relatives: Lord Huntingfield (father); Lord Stevenson of Coddenham (son-in-law)
- Military career
- Allegiance: United Kingdom
- Branch: Royal Navy, Royal Air Force Volunteer Reserve, Royal Auxiliary Air Force
- Service years: 1940–1949 (RN); 1949–1950 (RAFVR); 1950-after 1967 (RAuxAF)
- Rank: Air Commodore
- Service number: 205378 (RAuxAF)
- Conflicts: Second World War: Last battle of the battleship Bismarck
- Awards: Knight Grand Cross of the Order of the British Empire (1977); Companion of the Order of the Bath (1973); Air Force Cross (1955); Air Efficiency Award (1954); Knight of Justice of the Order of St John (1959); Commander, Legion of Honour (France) (1981); Grand Officer, Order of the Crown (Belgium) (1983)

Air Commodore Sir Peter Beckford Rutgers Vanneck GBE CB AFC AE DL (7 January 1922 – 2 August 1999) was a British Royal Navy officer, fighter pilot, engineer, stockbroker and politician. He made notable contributions to Anglo-French relations as Lord Mayor of London and as a Member of the European Parliament.

== Early life ==
Vanneck was born on 7 January 1922 in London, the youngest son of Lord Huntingfield and American-born Margaret Eleanor Crosby.

He spent his early years in Australia during his father's tenure as Governor of Victoria in the 1930s. He attended Geelong Grammar School and was sent back to Britain to study at Stowe School, having won a scholarship.

== War service and Royal Navy career ==
Vanneck joined the Royal Navy during World War II. He studied at the Royal Naval College as an officer cadet from 1 January 1940 to 1 September 1940, when he passed out as a midshipman. He served on HMS King George V during the operation to sink the Bismarck, and on HMS Eskimo. He commanded a LCA during service off North African coast.

Having attended a promotion course in Portsmouth from May to August 1941, he was promoted to sub lieutenant on 10 October 1942 with seniority from 1 August 1941. He joined the crew of the sloop HMS Wren in December 1942. He was promoted to lieutenant on 25 May 1943 with seniority from 1 December 1942. HMS Wren was part of the 2nd Escort Group under the command of Captain Johnnie Walker, the most successful anti-submarine unit of World War II. He commanded a Motor Torpedo Boat from August 1944 to the end of the war.

After the war, he trained as a pilot. On 30 September 1945, he transferred to 771 Naval Air Squadron of the Fleet Air Arm. The squadron was based at RNAS Yeovilton. He transferred to 807 Naval Air Squadron on 18 August 1947. He retired from the Royal Navy on 24 May 1949, when he resigned his commission.

== University and Air Force service ==
After leaving the Royal Navy in 1949, Vanneck matriculated at Trinity College, Cambridge. He joined the Cambridge University Air Squadron to further pursue his interest in flying, and was commissioned into the Royal Air Force Volunteer Reserve as a flying officer on 17 November 1949.

He transferred to No. 601 (County of London) Squadron of the Royal Auxiliary Air Force in 1950 and was commissioned into the RAuxAF as a flying officer on 18 December 1950 with seniority from 9 October 1950. He was promoted to flight lieutenant on 16 July 1951 with seniority from 9 October 1950. He graduated from the University of Cambridge with a Master of Arts in engineering. He studied at Harvard University, US in 1953. While there, he was seconded to 101 Squadron Massachusetts Air National Guard, flying the P-51 Mustang.

In 1958, he transferred to No. 3619 (County of Suffolk) Fighter Control Unit based at RAF Nacton He was promoted to squadron leader on 1 July 1958. He commanded the unit from 28 June 1959 to 1 February 1961. He then moved No 1 (County of Hertford) Maritime Headquarters Unit based at RAF Northwood. On 1 July 1962, he was promoted to group captain and appointed Inspector of the Royal Auxiliary Air Force. He resigned that appointment and retired from the Royal Auxiliary Air Force on 1 September 1973.

== Business career ==
Vanneck then went into business with the engineering company Ransome's in Ipswich, followed by Rowe and Pitman (stockbrokers) in the City of London. He was appointed to the Council of the London Stock Exchange in 1968. He was Deputy Chairman from 1973 to 1975. He retired from the Council in 1979.

== Political career ==
Vanneck became involved in Municipal affairs through the City of London Corporation (as Alderman for Cordwainer Ward and a member of many Livery Companies).

After a year serving as a Sheriff of London in 1974, he was elected the 650th Lord Mayor of London in November 1977, towards the end of the Queen's Silver Jubilee year. He made an eloquent speech at the Guildhall in which he recalled the first time he had met The Queen, who accompanied her father during a visit to the Royal Naval College when Vanneck was a young cadet there.

A popular Lord Mayor, Vanneck declared that despite his interesting careers, he had missed out on the one he would most like, which was to be a tug-boat skipper on the Thames. He made excellent contacts with his Paris counterpart Jacques Chirac and arranged an official visit to visit (one of only two that had taken place since the French revolution). Vanneck was a Francophile who was fluent in French.

At the end of his Lord Mayoral term, Vanneck was adopted as Conservative candidate for the European Parliament for Cleveland. He won the seat at the 1979 election, enjoying his time in the European institutions. He was vice-chairman of the Political Affairs committee and served on Energy Resources and Technology. After keeping his seat by only 2,625 votes in 1984, he lost in the 1989 election, and then retired from public life.

== Later life ==
High Sheriff of Suffolk from 1974 until his death, Vanneck continued to enjoy yacht racing (a member of the Royal Yacht Squadron, he was a regular at Cowes Week). Vanneck was a freemason.

He died on 2 August 1999 in London. His widow Lady Vanneck, née Elizabeth Lechmere Macaskie, died 14 June 2023, aged 94.

== Honours and decorations ==
As part of the 1955 Birthday Honours, Vanneck was awarded the Air Force Cross (AFC). In the 1963 New Year Honours, he was appointed Officer of the Order of the British Empire (OBE). In January 1965, he was appointed a Knight of the Venerable Order of Saint John. As part of the 1973 Birthday Honours, he was appointed Companion of the Order of the Bath (CB). He was promoted to Knight Grand Cross of the Order of the British Empire (GBE) as Lord Mayor of London elect.

He was appointed aide-de-camp to Queen Elizabeth II on 26 February 1963. He relinquish the appointment on 1 September 1973, when he retired from the Royal Auxiliary Air Force. He was a Deputy Lieutenant of the County of London from 1970. He was appointed to the honorary position of Inspector-General of the Royal Auxiliary Air Force on 16 September 1974, and held it until 1 January 1984.

European Parliament
Preceded by Direct elections started	Member of the European Parliament for Cleveland; 1979–1984	Succeeded by Constituency altered
Preceded by Constituency created	Member of the European Parliament for Cleveland and Yorkshire North; 1984–1989	Succeeded by David Bowe
Honorary titles
Preceded by Sir Robin Gillett	Lord Mayor of London; 1977–1978	Succeeded by Sir Kenneth Cork
