= Cleveland and Yorkshire North (European Parliament constituency) =

Former European Parliament constituency

- European Parliament constituency
- Boundary within North East England (1984-1994)
- Member state: United Kingdom
- Created: 1984
- Dissolved: 1994
- MEPs: 1

Prior to its uniform adoption of proportional representation in 1999, the United Kingdom used first-past-the-post for the European elections in England, Scotland and Wales. The European Parliament constituencies used under that system were smaller than the later regional constituencies and only had one Member of the European Parliament each.

The constituency of Cleveland and Yorkshire North was one of them.

It consisted of the Westminster Parliament constituencies of Hartlepool, Langbaurgh, Middlesbrough, Redcar, Richmond (Yorks), Skipton and Ripon, Stockton North, and Stockton South.

== Members of the European Parliament ==
Election	Member	Party
1984	Peter Vanneck	Conservative
1989	David Bowe	Labour

== Election results ==
European elections 1984: Cleveland and Yorkshire North
Party	Candidate	Votes	%	±%
Conservative	Peter Vanneck	73,217	40.7	
Labour Co-op	Paul F. Tinnion	70,592	39.3	
SDP	R.C. (Colin) Beever	35,916	20.0	
Majority		2,625	1.4	
Turnout		179,725	31.7	
Conservative win (new seat)				

European elections 1989: Cleveland and Yorkshire North
Party	Candidate	Votes	%	±%
Labour	David Bowe	94,953	47.6	+8.3
Conservative	Peter Vanneck	70,861	35.5	−5.2
Green	Owen Dumpleton	17,225	8.6	New
SLD	Thomas W. Mawston	8,470	4.2	−15.8
SDP	Ralph I. Andrew	7,970	4.0	New
Majority		24,092	12.1	N/A
Turnout		199,479	34.9	+3.2
Labour gain from Conservative		Swing		
