= Merseyside West (European Parliament constituency) =

Former European Parliament constituency

- European Parliament constituency
- Boundary within North West England (1984-1994)
- Member state: United Kingdom
- Created: 1984
- Dissolved: 1999
- MEPs: 1

Prior to its uniform adoption of proportional representation in 1999, the United Kingdom used first-past-the-post for the European elections in England, Scotland and Wales. The European Parliament constituencies used under that system were smaller than the later regional constituencies and only had one Member of the European Parliament each.

From 1984 to 1999, the constituency of Merseyside West was one of them, following on from the previous "Liverpool" constituency which existed on different boundaries from 1979 to 1984.

When it was created in England in 1984, it consisted of the Westminster Parliament constituencies of Bootle, Crosby, Liverpool Broadgreen, Liverpool Mossley Hill, Liverpool Riverside, Liverpool Walton, Liverpool West Derby, Southport, and remained broadly the same, despite the internal re-arrangement of some of these constituencies (Wavertree replacing Broadgreen and Mossley Hill, and a boundary shift for some of the others).

Ken Stewart, a left-wing and anti-Europe Labour councillor, won the seat for Labour in 1984 from the Liverpool constituency's incumbent Gloria Hooper, later Baroness Hooper. He retained it in 1989 and 1994 with increased majorities. His death in 1996 triggered a by-election, one of a number of crucial by-elections resulting in comfortable Labour victories in the closing months of John Major's Conservative government. Labour's candidate was Richard Corbett, pro-Europe (and later the Leader of the Labour MEPs, the EPLP), who held the seat until it was abolished with the introduction of the regional constituency proportional representation system in 1999. Corbett won the selection to be the Labour candidate in a ballot of all party members in the constituency, winning out against David Watts, later MP for St Helens, Margaret Wall (later Baroness Wall of New Barnet), David Martin, leader of Sefton Council and a number of other local councillors from Liverpool and Bootle.

Under the regional constituency system, Merseyside West became part of North West England.

Boundary within North West England (1994-1999)

== MEPs ==
Elected	Member	Party
1984	Kenneth Stewart	Labour
1996 by-election	Richard Corbett	Labour
1999	Constituency abolished: see North West England	

== Election results ==
European Parliament election, 1984: Merseyside West
Party	Candidate	Votes	%	±%
Labour	Kenneth Stewart	65,915	42.3	
Conservative	Miss G. D. Hooper	52,718	33.8	
Liberal	Paul R. Clark	37,303	23.9	
Majority		13,197	8.5	
Turnout		155,936	28.3	
Labour win (new seat)				

European Parliament election, 1989: Merseyside West
Party	Candidate	Votes	%	±%
Labour	Kenneth Stewart	93,717	52.4	+10.1
Conservative	Michael D. Byrne	43,900	24.6	−9.2
Green	Lawrence Brown	23,052	12.9	New
SLD	Mrs. H. F. (Flo) Clucas	16,327	9.1	−14.8
Protestant Reformation	D. J. E. Carson	1,747	1.0	New
Majority		49,817	27.8	+19.3
Turnout		178,743	35.1	+6.8
Labour hold		Swing		

European Parliament election, 1994: Merseyside West
Party	Candidate	Votes	%	±%
Labour	Kenneth Stewart	78,819	58.4	+6.0
Conservative	Chris J. Varley	27,008	20.0	−4.6
Liberal Democrats	David Bamber	19,097	14.1	+5.0
Liberal	S. R. Radford	4,714	3.5	New
Green	Mrs. Linda M. Lever	4,573	3.4	−9.5
Natural Law	John D. Collins	852	0.6	New
Majority		51,811	38.4	+10.6
Turnout		135,063	26.2	−8.9
Labour hold		Swing		

Merseyside West by-election 12 December 1996
Party	Candidate	Votes	%	±%
Labour	Richard Corbett	31,484	53.8	−4.6
Conservative	Jeremy Myers	12,780	21.8	+1.8
Liberal Democrats	Kiron J.C. Reid	8,829	15.1	+1.0
Liberal	Steve Radford	4,050	6.9	+3.4
National Democrats	Simon Darby	718	1.2	New
Natural Law	John D. Collins	680	1.2	+0.6
Majority		18,704	32.0	−6.4
Turnout		58,541	11.3	−14.9
Labour hold		Swing		
