= Kenneth Stewart =

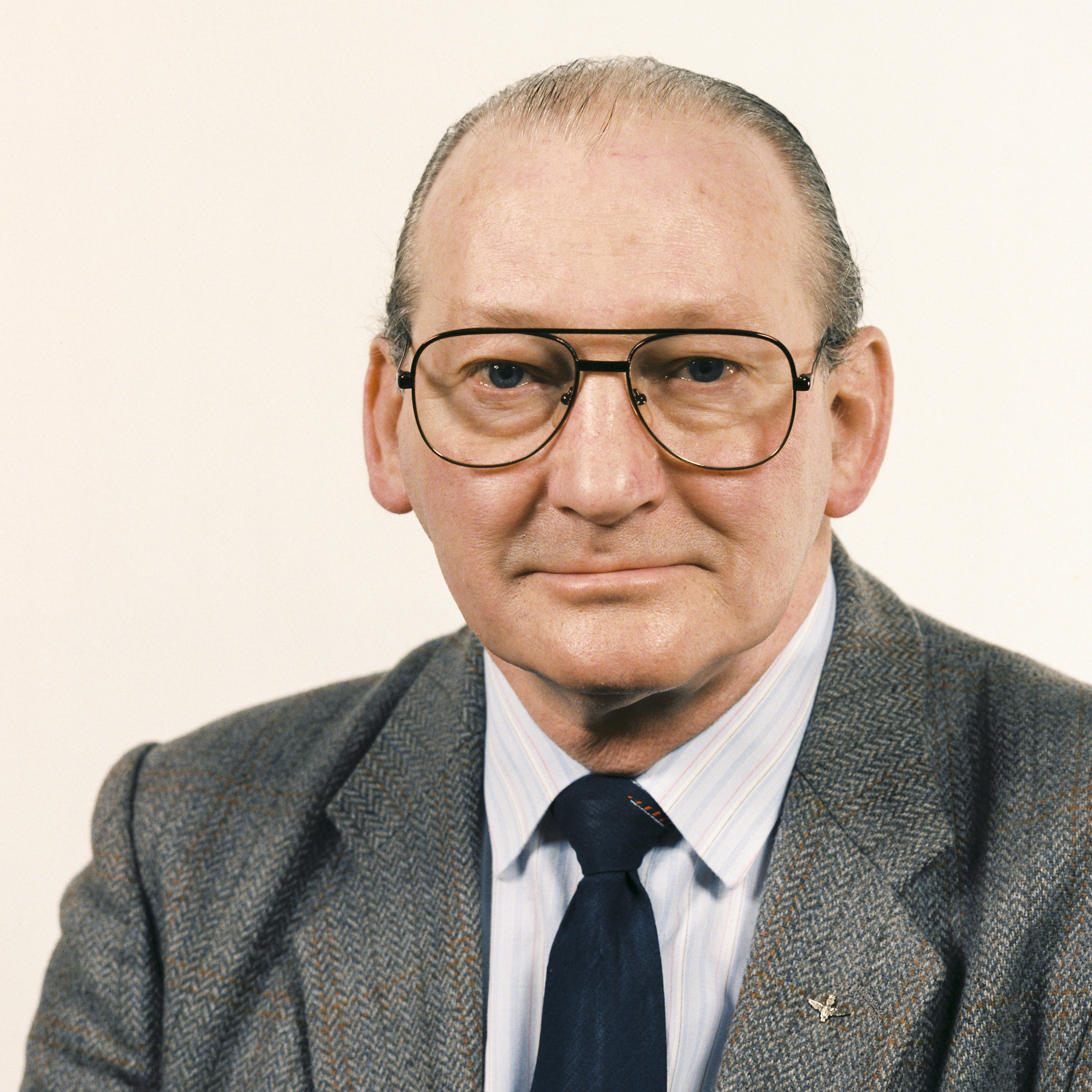
- Official MEP portrait

Member of the European Parliament for Merseyside West
- In office 14 June 1984 – 2 September 1996
- Preceded by: Gloria Hooper (Note: Hooper, a Conservative, represented the Liverpool constituency prior to its abolition in 1984. That year, she ran for the newly established Merseyside West seat but lost to Stewart.)
- Succeeded by: Richard Corbett

Personal details
- Born: Kenneth Albert Stewart; 28 June 1925 Liverpool, England, UK
- Died: 2 September 1996 (aged 71) Liverpool, England, UK
- Party: Labour
- Spouse: Margaret Robertson Vass (m. 1946)
- Children: 3
- Occupation: Joiner carpenter; trade unionist; politician

Military service
- Branch/service: British Army
- Unit: Parachute Regiment
- Battles/wars: Second World War; European theatre

Kenneth Albert Stewart (28 June 1925 – 2 September 1996), was a British politician who served as a Member of the European Parliament (MEP) from 1984 to 1996.

Stewart worked as a carpenter and joiner, and also spent time as a sergeant in the Parachute Regiment, and in the Merchant Navy. He joined the Labour Party, and served on Liverpool City Council from 1964, chairing its housing committee.

At the 1984 European Parliament election, Stewart was elected in Merseyside West, serving until his death in 1996.
