= Labour Movement for Europe =

Socialist Society

- Abbreviation: LME
- Purpose: Improve and broaden the understanding of the European Union within the Labour Party, and to support the closest possible relationship.
- Headquarters: London, England
- Region served: United Kingdom
- President: The Lord Kinnock
- Vice-Presidents: Richard Corbett; The Lady Royall; Anna Turley
- Chair: Stella Creasy
- Parent organization: Labour Party
- Affiliations: Party of European Socialists
- Website: labourmovementforeurope.uk

The Labour Movement for Europe (LME) is one of 20 "socialist societies" affiliated to the UK Labour Party, just like the Fabians and The Jewish Labour Movement.

The society campaigns on European issues within the Labour Party, supporting UK membership of the EU prior to Brexit and campaigning to reform and improve the EU. During the 2016 United Kingdom European Union membership referendum it made a left-wing case for Remain and until the December 2019 general election result argued there should be a "people's vote" between Remain and the final Brexit deal negotiated by the government, in which the Labour Party should argue passionately and clearly to Remain within the EU. Now that Brexit has happened, it campaigns for the government to negotiate the closest possible relationship with the EU and for Labour to maintain relations with its sister parties in the Party of European Socialists. Following the 2024 general election, the LME now has more MPs than the Conservative Party does.

In the 2020 Labour leadership and deputy leadership elections, the LME endorsed Keir Starmer and Ian Murray for Leader and Deputy respectively. Chair of the LME at the time, Anna Turley commented that it was "because of their strong pro-EU values and the fact that we think they are in the best place to take Labour to victory at the next election."

Originally set up in the early 1960s as the Labour Committee for Europe, it split in 1981 when some of its prominent members (notably Roy Jenkins, Shirley Williams, Bill Rodgers, John Roper and Tom Ellis) left Labour to found the SDP. Others (such as Denis Howell MP (who became the new chair) and trade union leaders Geoffrey Drain and Roy Grantham) stayed and renamed the organisation Labour Movement for Europe, making a left wing case for Europe, remaining within the Labour Party.

Over recent years, its Chairs have included Bill Rammell, Chris Bryant, Mary Creagh, Richard Corbett, and Anna Turley. The current chair is Stella Creasy.

== Current executive ==
Chair: Stella Creasy, Labour MP for Walthamstow

Honorary President: Neil Kinnock, former Labour leader (1983-1992), Vice-President of the European Commission (1999-2004), Labour peer since 2005

Hon Vice Presidents:

- Baroness Jan Royall, former Leader of the House of Lords, Labour peer since 2004

- Richard Corbett, the last UK Labour leader in the EU Parliament (2017-2020), Labour MEP from 1996 to 2009 and then again from 2014 to 2020. (From 2010 to 2014 Corbett was senior advisor to the first full-time and long-term President of the European Council, Herman Van Rompuy.)

General Secretary: Giampi Alhadeff, former General Secretary of the European Parliamentary Labour Party (2006-2012)
