= Outwood Academy Portland =

Location
- Netherton Road; Worksop, Nottinghamshire, S80 2SF; England
- Coordinates: 53°17′42″N 1°07′00″W

Information
- Type: Academy
- Motto: "Students First"
- Established: 18 July 2012
- Local authority: Nottinghamshire
- Trust: Outwood Grange Academies Trust
- Department for Education URN: 138248 Tables
- Ofsted: Reports
- Chair of Academy Council: Annette Phillipson
- Principal: Danielle Sheehan
- Gender: Mixed
- Age: 11 to 18
- Enrolment: 1,717 (July 2024)
- Capacity: 1,720
- Houses: Africa, Europe, Asia, America and Oceania
- Colours: Purple and gold
- Publication: Half Termly Newsletters
- Website: portland.outwood.com

Outwood Academy Portland is a secondary school with academy status, in Worksop, North Nottinghamshire, on the site of the former Portland School. It has a mixed intake of over 1,700 boys and girls ages 11–18 with a comprehensive admissions policy.

The school is operated by Outwood Grange Academies Trust, and the current principal is Danielle Sheehan, taking over from Godsway Dzoboku in January 2022.

== History ==
Prior to its conversion, Portland School was in Special Measures (the lowest category for an Ofsted inspection). Following a massive investment of time, support and finance from the local authority, it had managed to achieve 41% 5A*-C including English and Maths, which was more than 10% below its target. However, this had been a great accomplishment as previously the school had spent several years achieving results that were in the teens. In Sept 2011 Outwood Grange Academies Trust began its journey with Portland School. The school was converted and became part of the Outwood Grange Academies Trust and was renamed Outwood Academy Portland. In January 2012 Dr Philip Smith was appointed Principal. The transformation began immediately and by March 2012 Ofsted stated that the ethos of the school was so different they were going to remove the Special Measures category and grade the school as satisfactory. They commented on the orderly manner in which students behaved, the quality of teaching and learning that was now evident, and the belief students were starting to have in themselves. That year the school exceed its target (of 52%) for the first time and achieved 57% 5A*-C including English and maths. The academy continued to excel in all aspects, with results the following year reaching 75%. Ofsted re-visited the school in March 2014 and graded it as Outstanding in every area, with the 24-month change from Special Measures to Outstanding being recorded as the fastest ever turn-around for a secondary school. The following year results increased again, and Outwood Academy Portland was also awarded the regional winner for its provision for disadvantaged pupils. An award it was nominated for again in 2016 following a further increase in 5 A*-Cs up to 81%. This also resulted in the academy receiving a letter from Nick Gibb (MP) stating that the academy had been identified as being in the top-100 schools in England for: attainment of 5A*-Cs, greatest sustained improvement, and value added from KS2 to KS4.

== Ofsted judgement ==
The academy has received a rating of "Outstanding", the highest rating, from Ofsted in its latest inspection in March 2014. OAP also maintained the Outstanding judgement at a monitoring visit in April 2019, and a judgement of 'GOOD' in September 2024.

== Reporting system ==
The progress of each pupil is monitored closely through the Praising Stars system of half-termly assessment, monitoring and intervention. As a commitment to parents the academy reports on every child’s progress every six weeks, giving accurate information for all subjects. The academy holds three parents’ evenings per year where all parents/carers have the opportunity to meet all subject teachers to discuss progress.

== Behaviour and discipline system ==
The academy uses a system of escalating "consequences" as a framework for discipline, beginning with C1 and ranging through to C6 (exclusion). This has proven to be highly successful in altering negative behaviour patterns and providing pupils with full responsibility for their actions and any following outcomes. C1 - C3 are warnings and a C4 means a detention from that particular subject. A C5 means that students have to spend a day in consequences or isolation. A C6 means exclusion

== Pastoral support ==
Pupils are members of tutor groups known as a vertical mentor groups that meet on a daily basis.

Vertical mentor groups are each named after a country, and split into houses named after the continents Africa, Europe, Asia, America and Oceania. Students go to assembly in the vertical mentor groups as each has a different day

== Sixth form ==
Outwood Academy Portland shares a sixth form provision with Outwood Academy Valley. Marketed as Outwood Post 16 Centre, the sixth form was moved to a new building across the road from Outwood Academy Valley in 2008. Although the sixth form centre is operated as a separate institution it is governed by both schools.
