= Portland School, Worksop =

Defunct specialist science college in Worksop, Nottinghamshire, England

Portland School

Location
- Sparken Hill; Worksop, Nottinghamshire, S80 1AW; England; 53.295042°N 1.116765°W

Information
- Type: Specialist Science College
- Motto: "Achieving Success Aiming for Excellence"
- Established: 1956 (redeveloped 2007)
- Closed: 20 July 2011
- Local authority: Nottinghamshire
- Specialist: Specialist Science College
- Gender: Coeducational
- Age: 11 to 16
- Enrolment: 1597
- Houses: Welbeck, Sherwood, Clumber and Rufford.
- Colours: Navy Blue, Maroon, Gold
- Website: www.portland.outwood.com

Portland School was a specialist science college situated in Worksop, United Kingdom.

The headteacher upon closing was Elaine Hamilton. The original school buildings were situated on Sparken Hill Worksop, and were built for when the school opened in 1956. The current school building, which is situated on Netherton road, was built in 2007. Portland School was in special measures, as it had an inadequate report from OFSTED after an inspection in March 2010, before its closure.

== Early history ==
=== Technical school ===
The Winifred Portland County Technical Grammar School opened in September 1956. Previous to that there had been a Secondary Technical School separate from but within the Technical College on Blyth Road. The staff and pupils transferred to Winifred Portland when it opened. The school then became the Winifred Portland Technical Grammar school until it was renamed Portland Comprehensive and merged with both the Central and Priory Secondary Schools

=== Grammar school ===
Henry Hartland Grammar School opened in 1962, being officially opened on 21 June 1963 by Eric James, Baron James of Rusholme.

=== Comprehensive schools ===
In 1970 Worksop's secondary schools became comprehensive - The Hartland School and Portland Comprehensive School.

== Merger with Hartland ==
In late 2003 the decision was made to merge the school with the Hartland secondary school which was north and next door to Portland school. This merger happened in 2004 though not without concerns by some parents . The merge with the Hartland site created a site with: three canteens, two science blocks, two assembly halls, three outdoor sports courts including two large barn buildings, three fields including one large field equivalent to 9 football pitches.

== Move to new site ==
Building of the new school site began in early 2006 with a contract between Nottinghamshire County Council, and Transform Schools. The work was completed in time for students to move in after the Christmas break, in early 2008. The former site was demolished soon after in mid 2008. The new school facilities include: one canteen, one large assembly hall with seating for 300 persons, three outdoor sports spaces including a floodlit Astroturf, a MUGA (Multi Use Games Area), and a large field, two indoor sports halls, and a small gym room with weights, running and rowing machines. The building was smaller than the cumulative size of the former Portland buildings and surrounding walkways

== Further education ==
On 3 September 2008 Worksop Post-16 Centre opened as a consolidated site for further education in Worksop. The centre is situated on Valley Road, adjacent to Valley School.

Courses consist primarily of A-levels across a range of art, humanity and science subjects.

== Academic performance ==
Portland School had often achieved GCSE results below the national average. The School achieved its highest GCSE results ever in 2011.

== Closure ==
On 20 July 2011 the school officially closed to become part of the Outwood Grange of Schools and became Outwood Academy Portland upon reopening for the new school term.

== Notable former pupils ==
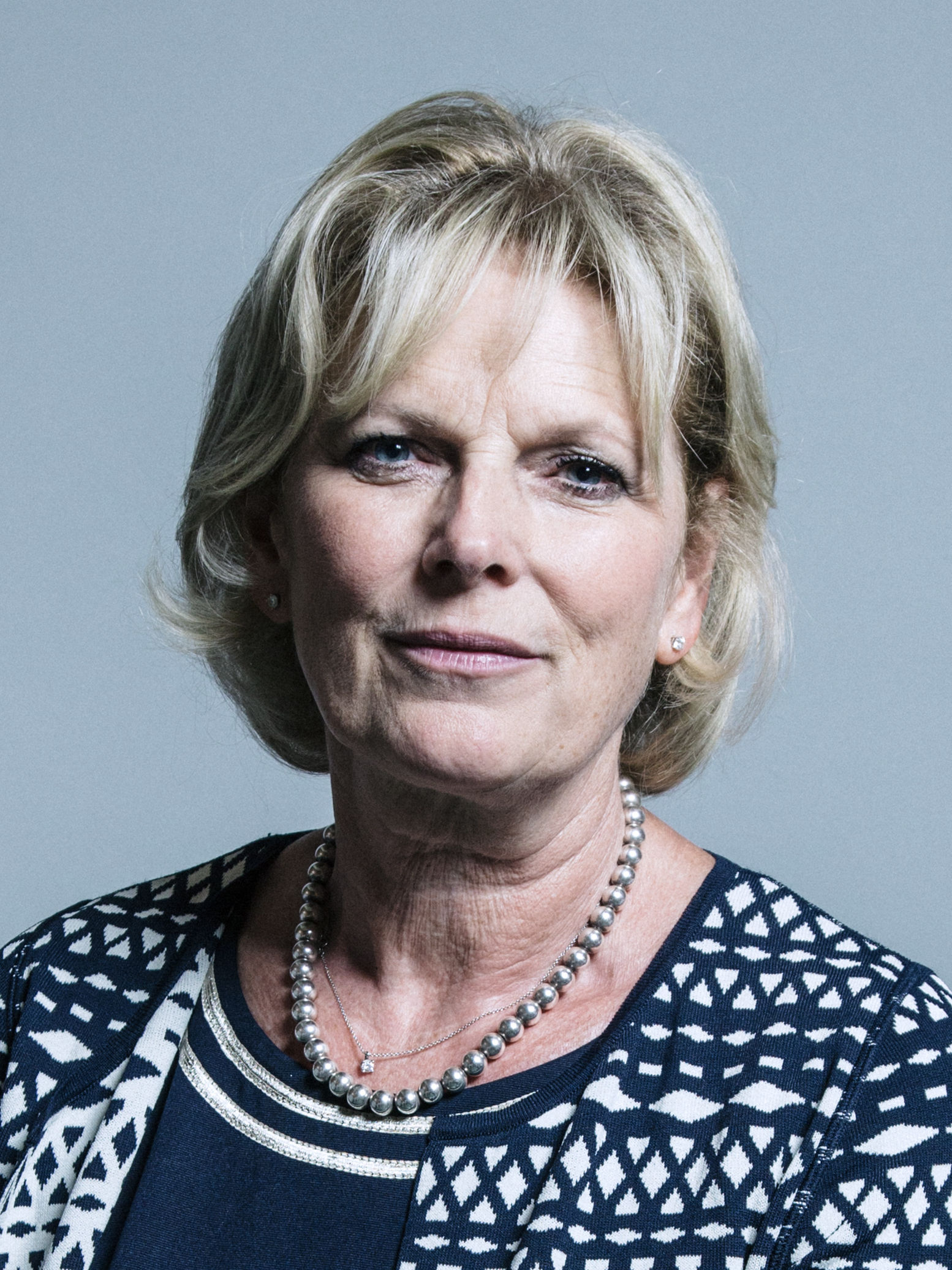
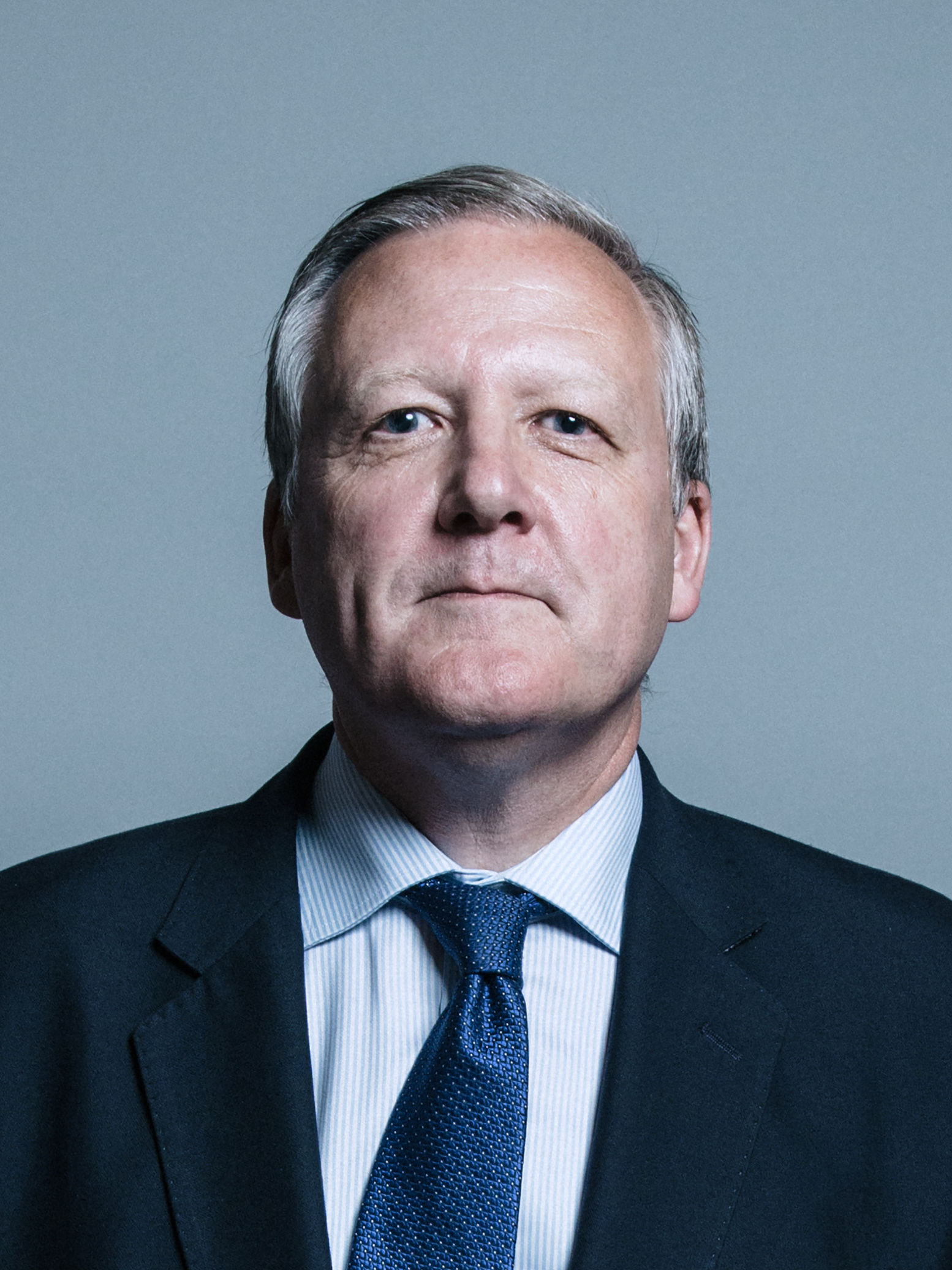
Anna Soubry (left) and Kevan Jones (right).

=== Henry Hartland Grammar School ===
- Cynthia Bower, controversial first Chief Executive of the Care Quality Commission
- Anna Soubry (became comprehensive in her third year), MP for Broxtowe, and former local television journalist from 1984 to 1992 for Central News East

=== Hartland School ===
- Rory Palmer, Labour MEP for the East Midlands

=== Portland Comprehensive School ===
- Kevan Jones, Labour MP since 2001 for North Durham
- Luke Wood, cricketer for Nottinghamshire
- Lee Thompson
