= Oxford University Labour Club =

Political club at the University of Oxford

- Logo of the Club
- Abbreviation: OULC
- Formation: 1919; 107 years ago
- Type: Student political society
- Location: Oxford, United Kingdom
- Co-Chairs: Tom Haydon (St Hugh's); Catherine Harrison (St Hugh's)
- Honorary Co-Chairs: Neil Kinnock; Ella Staddon
- Affiliations: Labour Party
- Website: www.oxunilabour.com

Oxford University Labour Club (OULC) is a student club at the University of Oxford founded in 1919 to promote democratic socialism at Oxford University. The club is affiliated to the Labour Party and claims to be the UK's largest and oldest student Labour Club.

The club caters for any students who are interested in the ideals of the labour movement whether members of the Labour Party or entirely new to politics. Stewart Wood, special adviser to consecutive Labour Party leaders Gordon Brown and Ed Miliband, said that 'OULC is held up as an exemplar of what needs to be done.' During his visit to Oxford in July 2009 the Prime Minister Gordon Brown was reported as having praised OULC's 'brilliant contribution to progressive politics in the University, the city and the country.' The club was instrumental in returning Andrew Smith to Parliament for Oxford East at the 2010 General Election with a 4.1% swing to Labour, the largest in England outside London.

Throughout the year it hosts a range of speaker, social, discussion, and campaigning events, as well as producing a termly magazine called Look Left. Signature events include the annual Barbara Castle Memorial Lecture and John Smith Memorial Dinner.

In 2016, some officers of the Oxford University Labour Club resigned citing allegations of antisemitism in the club. This resulted in the national Labour Party officially investigating the club for antisemitism, resulting in a report concluding that the true extent of the problem was hard to verify.

== History ==
=== David Lewis and the early 1930s ===
David Lewis in 1968

When David Lewis came to Oxford, the Labour Club was a tame organisation adhering to Christian activism and the theories of people such as R. H. Tawney and his book The Acquisitive Society. David's modified Jewish Labour Bundist interpretation of Marxism, that Cameron Smith labels "Parliamentary Marxism," ignited the renewed interest in the club after the disappointment with Ramsay MacDonald's second Labour government. In 1932 the Labour Club and the October Club (Oxford University's communist society) jointly organised a reception for a contingent of hunger marchers passing through Oxford.

The Oxford newspaper The Isis noted Lewis' leadership ability at this early stage in his career in their 7 February 1934 issue: "The energy of these University Socialists is almost unbelievable. If the Socialist movement as a whole is anything like as active as they are, then a socialist victory at the next election is inevitable."

In February 1934, British fascist William Joyce, (Lord Haw Haw), visited Oxford. Lewis and future Ontario Co-operative Commonwealth Federation leader Ted Jolliffe, organised a noisy protest against the fascist, by simply planting Labour Club members in the dance hall that Joyce was speaking in, and causing a commotion, as groups of two and three left making much noise on the creaking wooden floors. The speech was foiled. Afterwards, the Blackshirts contingent had a street battle in Oxford with members of the Labour Club and the townsfolk.

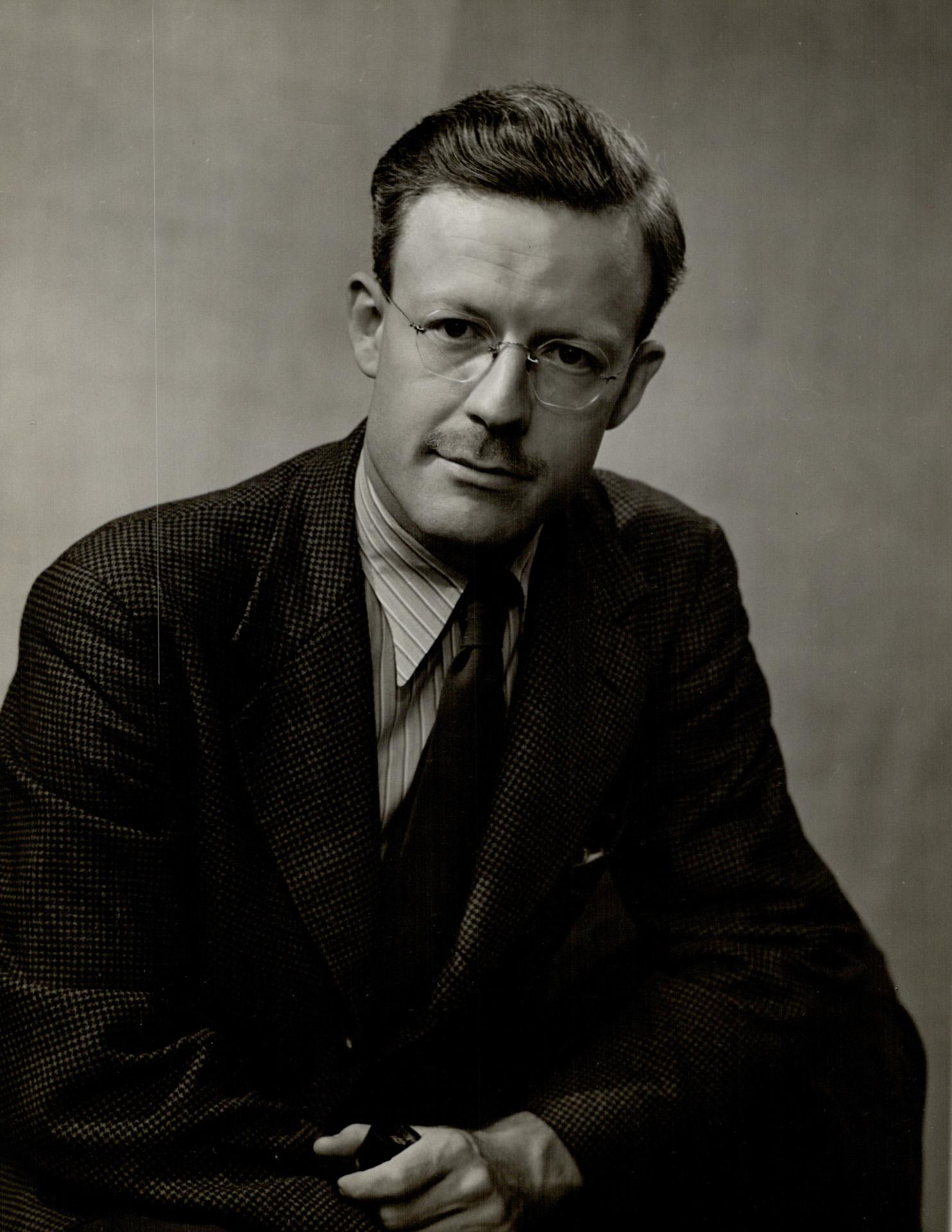
Ted Jolliffe in 1945

Lewis prevented the communists from really making inroads at Oxford during his time there. He increased the Labour Club's membership by three-quarters, from 484 members in December 1932 to over 850 members by the time he left, while the October Club never rose above 300 members. Ted Jolliffe stated "there was a difference between his speeches at the [Oxford] Union and his speeches at the Labour Club. His speeches at the Union had more humour in them; the atmosphere was entirely different. But his speeches at the Labour Club were deadly serious.... His influence at the Labour Club, more than anyone else's, I think, explains the failure of the Communists to make headway there." In 1935, the Soviet controlled Comintern's Seventh Congress, called for a united left response to fascism, called the popular front. The communist October Club used this call, for a popular front, as a pretext to have a union between themselves and the Labour Club. Under Lewis' leadership, the club was able to easily defeat a motion by the October Club, as only 20 OULC members voted for the union.

When Lewis returned to Canada in the summer of 1935, there really wasn't anyone to replace him, to keep the communists at bay as The Isis noted: "The Labour may have rejected fusion [with the October Club] but the matter is not yet settled. An interesting thing is the dearth of what are technically known as 'promising people' in the ranks of the Labour Club. For years the Labour Club has been turning out a Geoffrey Wilson, a Frank Hardie, a John Cripps, a David Lewis, each year: but this [coming] year there seems to be no figures as outstanding as these."

=== Communist merger ===
Since there was not a strong Labour leader to take over from Lewis after he graduated and left in the summer of 1935, the Labour Club amended its constitution to remove impediments to fusion with the communist October Club in December 1935. Shortly thereafter the two clubs joined together forming a "popular front". The club's membership peaked before the war at between 1000 and 1200 members depending on whose numbers were used, which was approximately a fifth of all of Oxford's 5023 students. Of the club's total membership, the Communists made up approximately less than 200 members.

=== Antisemitism inquiry ===
The national Labour Party appointed Janet Royall, to head an inquiry into allegations of antisemitism within the Club made in February 2016. The then-current Co-Chair and another officer resigned from the Club, alleging they were disturbed by the discrimination and antisemitism they alleged was inherent in the Club. The report – which was not published in full but was leaked to the media in August 2016 – concluded that antisemitic incidents had occurred and some Jewish members felt uncomfortable attending the Club, but that the extent of the problem was hard to verify.

== Constitution and organisation ==
OULC is run by an elected Executive Committee, as established under the OULC Constitution. The Constitution can be changed by a two-thirds majority at any OULC General Meeting, Termly General Meeting (TGM), or Extraordinary General Meeting; at which its members can also pass policy in the form of motions (such as submissions to the Labour Party's Policy Review), hear reports from the executive and elect (at the TGM) the new Executive.

OULC alumnus Roy Jenkins (right) with the President of the European Metalworkers' Federation

Under the most recent version of the OULC Constitution (as of Trinity Term 2022), the head of the Executive is the two Co-Chairs. One Co-Chair position must at all times be held by someone who "self-identifies partly or wholly as a woman or transfeminine", and three other positions on the Executive at every TGM, must be reserved for those who self-identify as belonging to a marginalised gender. The positions so reserved rotate around the Executive. If no one who self-identifies as a marginalised gender stands for such a position, the incoming Co-Chairs must produce a report to be made public, detailing what they will do to enhance the position of those who so self-identify within the Club. This also applies if the only two people standing for Co-Chair are men.

At the General Meeting in Trinity Term 2016, the Club also re-established its long-forgotten alumni network. Upon receiving permission from Lord Attlee, the grandson of Clement Attlee, the former Labour Prime Minister, the alumni network was named The Attlee Association, in recognition of the former Prime Minister.

OULC is responsible for the online blog, Look Left, that publishes articles about a range of political topics. It also provides reports of recent speaker events.

== Events ==
Neil Kinnock addressing the Club in Michaelmas Term 2026, alongside Co-Chairs Tom Haydon and Catherine Harrison

OULC has hosted a range of speakers from the Labour movement, including a number of high-profile politicians. In Trinity term 2009, OULC hosted the then current Secretary of State for Foreign and Commonwealth Affairs, David Miliband. He commented "I recently met with the OULC members and was impressed. [They] can help Labour be at the cutting edge."

OULC holds regular informal meetings to discuss policy. This provides its members with an opportunity to engage in serious political debate. An October 2008 review of party political events by the Cherwell commented that OULC is 'an active political party as opposed to a social gathering. Their meetings are informal, and last year they were visited by a number of prominent left wing politicians.'

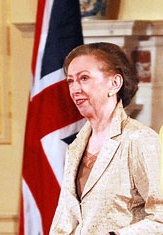
Recent speakers include Neil Kinnock, John McDonnell, and Margaret Beckett

OULC also runs campaigns. The club plays a role in the efforts to keep Oxford East Labour and contributed significantly to the election effort in July 2009 where Labour gained four seats on the county council, the most successful Labour result in the county. In its report on the election victory, the Cherwell cited the club's then co-chair, Jacob Turner, as saying that he felt the result was a consequence of "a very great effort from the local party including Labour Club members. We've been going out, meeting people, and asking them not to vote for us, but just how our councillors can help them. We've built up a relationship with residents which is ultimately expressed in voting." In the run up to the 2010 General Election the club regularly turned out 20 campaigners every Sunday. This made a huge contribution to Oxford East's position of having the highest voter contact rate of anywhere in the country (more than Wales, Scotland and the North-East put together). In 2012, the club was instrumental in Labour winning its first Student Ward in the city in over two decades. When possible the club sends members to other towns to campaign, including Reading, Slough, Southampton and even Edinburgh. In 2022, OULC travelled to Birmingham to campaign in the successful defence of Birmingham Erdington.

OULC holds a number of social events including a fresher's dinner in Michaelmas Term and a barbecue or picnic in Trinity term. OULC also hosts an annual dinner, the John Smith Memorial Dinner, in the fifth week of Hilary term. The dinner commemorates the contribution and life of John Smith, the former Labour party leader, who died suddenly in 1994. Recent speakers at this event have included Neil Kinnock, Andrew Adonis and Margaret Beckett.

The most prominent and regular social event at the society is called 'Beer and Bickering'. This is a weekly debating society whereby three or four motions, or points of discussion, are debated, where students take it in turns to make speeches either for or against the motion. The title of every motion always begins with the phrase 'this house believes', and there is usually a mixture of serious and joke motions. The event usually takes place at a college common room and lasts two or three hours.

== Involvement in Labour politics ==
=== Labour Students ===
OULC is affiliated with Labour Students and the national Labour Party, and former OULC members have held a number of positions there.

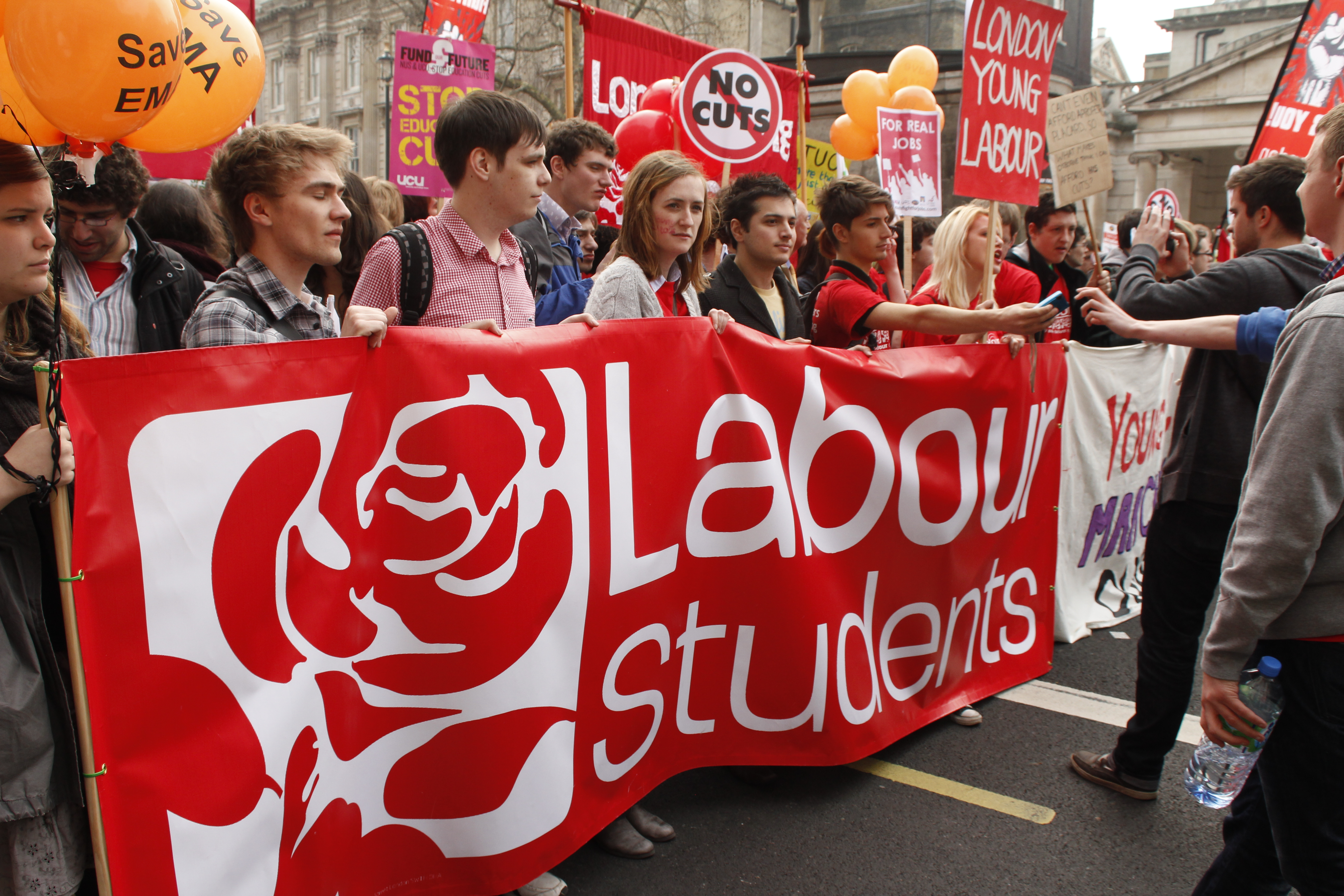
Labour Students protesting against government cuts in March 2011

In February 2011, OULC disaffiliated from Labour Students for a one-year period as a protest over the way the organisation was run. In February 2012, OULC voted by 20 to 4 to rejoin Labour Students citing the progress made by the leadership of the organisation in improving accountability and democracy. However, in 2019, the club voted unanimously to disaffiliate with the co-chairs Owen Winter and Rosie Sourbut citing incompetence by Labour Students' national committee and the expulsion of all but one Northern Labour Club. Shortly afterwards Labour's National Executive Committee voted to disaffiliate Labour Students altogether.

Following the recreation of Labour Students in 2022, OULC narrowly voted to support a motion in favour of engaging in their upcoming internal elections by endorsing candidates. Two members of OULC stood for the 2022 Labour Students executive, including one candidate for chair.

=== Other ===
OULC also has links with other socialist organisations, trade unions, and Labour Party groups, including the Oxford District, Reading and Slough Labour Parties.

== Broader political involvement ==
=== Oxford University Student Union ===
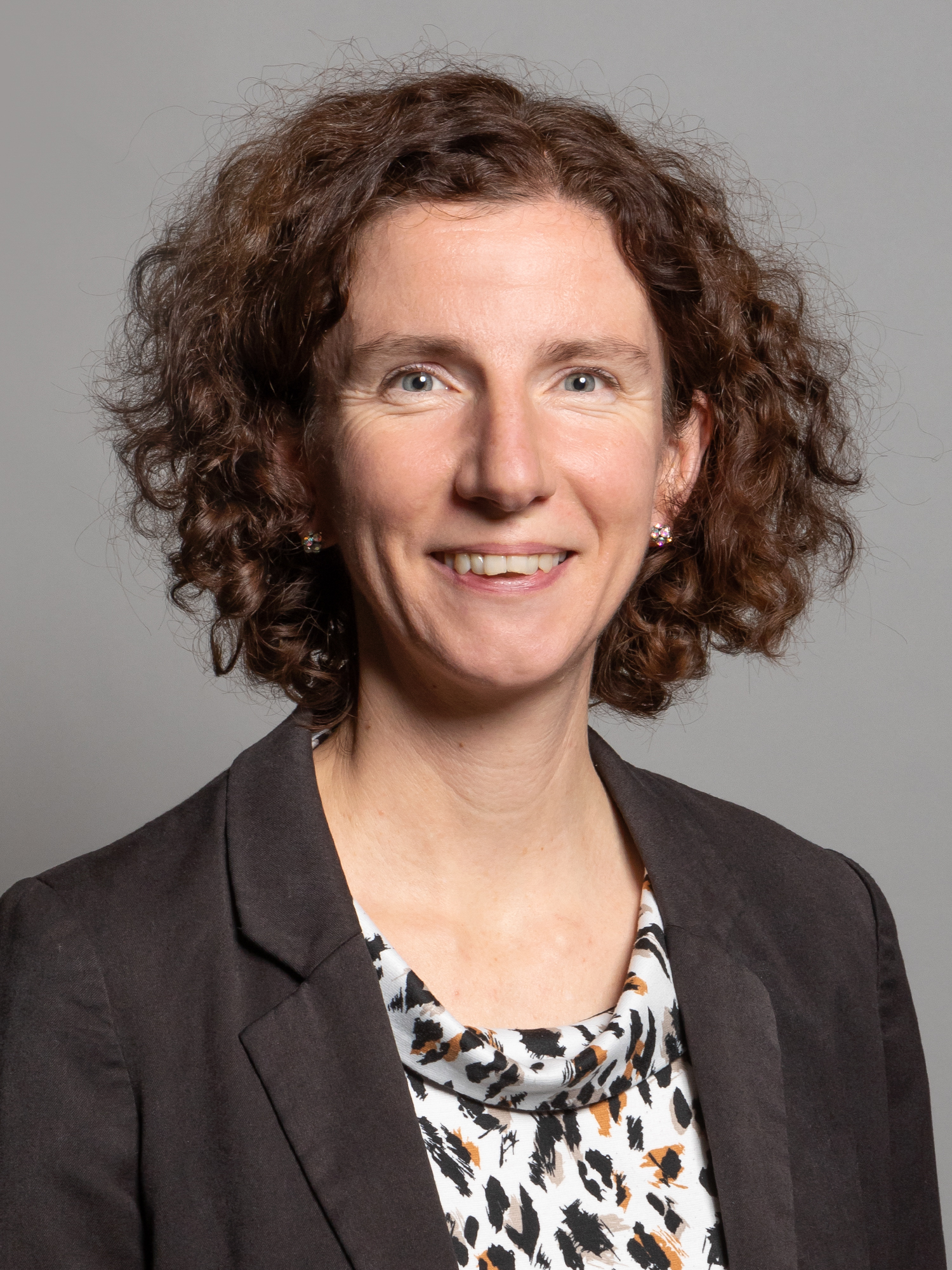
Anneliese Dodds was a Student Union President in the 1990s

Since the establishment of the Oxford University Student Union (OUSU) in the early 1970s, OULC has maintained a presence. There have been many Labour presidents, starting with John Grogan in the early 1980s, and OULC candidates have in recent years been successful in the 1999 (Anneliese Dodds), 2000 (Kirsty McNeill), 2004 (Emma Norris), 2005 (Alan Strickland) and 2006 (Martin McCluskey) elections. Whilst the Club no longer runs official candidates, OUSU's executive committee and delegate body has also had a Labour presence. In 2019, former co-chair Anisha Faruk was elected president of Oxford SU, and her fellow co-chair Ray Williams was elected VP for Access and Academic Affairs.

=== National Union of Students ===
Stephen Twigg was National President of the National Union of Students and an OULC member in the early 1990s.

=== Local government ===
Six current or former members of OULC currently sit on Oxford City Council, and one is a County Councillor in Oxfordshire. As of the 2016 Oxford City Council Elections, Dan Iley-Wiliamson, OULC Membership and Alumni Officer at the time, was elected as a councillor for the Holywell ward, serving most city centre University colleges. In 2021, Michael O'Connor, a graduate student and OULC member, was elected County Councillor for Holywell Ward.

A number of former OULC co-chairs stood for council seats in 2022, including David Parton and Eleanor Ormsby, both for Westminster City Council.

=== Parliament ===
At the 2005 General Election, five recent former OULC members stood for election as Labour candidates. In the 2019 election, Rosie Sourbut, who had been the co-chair earlier that year, ran as the Labour candidate in Oxford West and Abingdon.

In parliament former OULC members currently include Angela and Maria Eagle, Ed Miliband, Rachel Reeves, Ellie Reeves, Anneliese Dodds, Bridget Phillipson, Keir Mather, and Alistair Strathern. While no longer in parliament, John Grogan, David Miliband and Ed Balls were OULC members at Oxford (Balls was also a member of the Oxford University Conservative Association) and before Britain left the European Union, OULC alumni Richard Corbett and Mary Honeyball were both members of the European Parliament.

== Former members of the executive committee ==
Notable former members of the executive committee

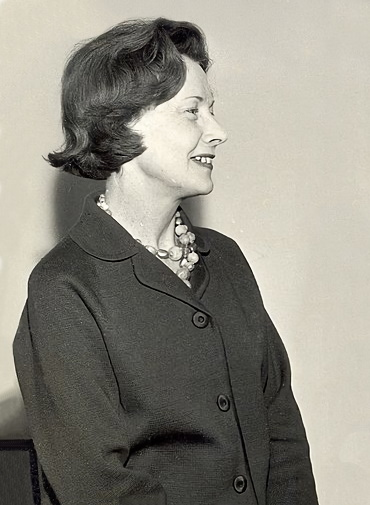
Barbara Castle (St Hugh's College), former Minister

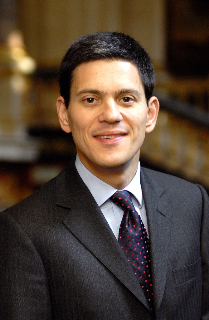
David Miliband (Corpus Christi College), former Foreign Secretary

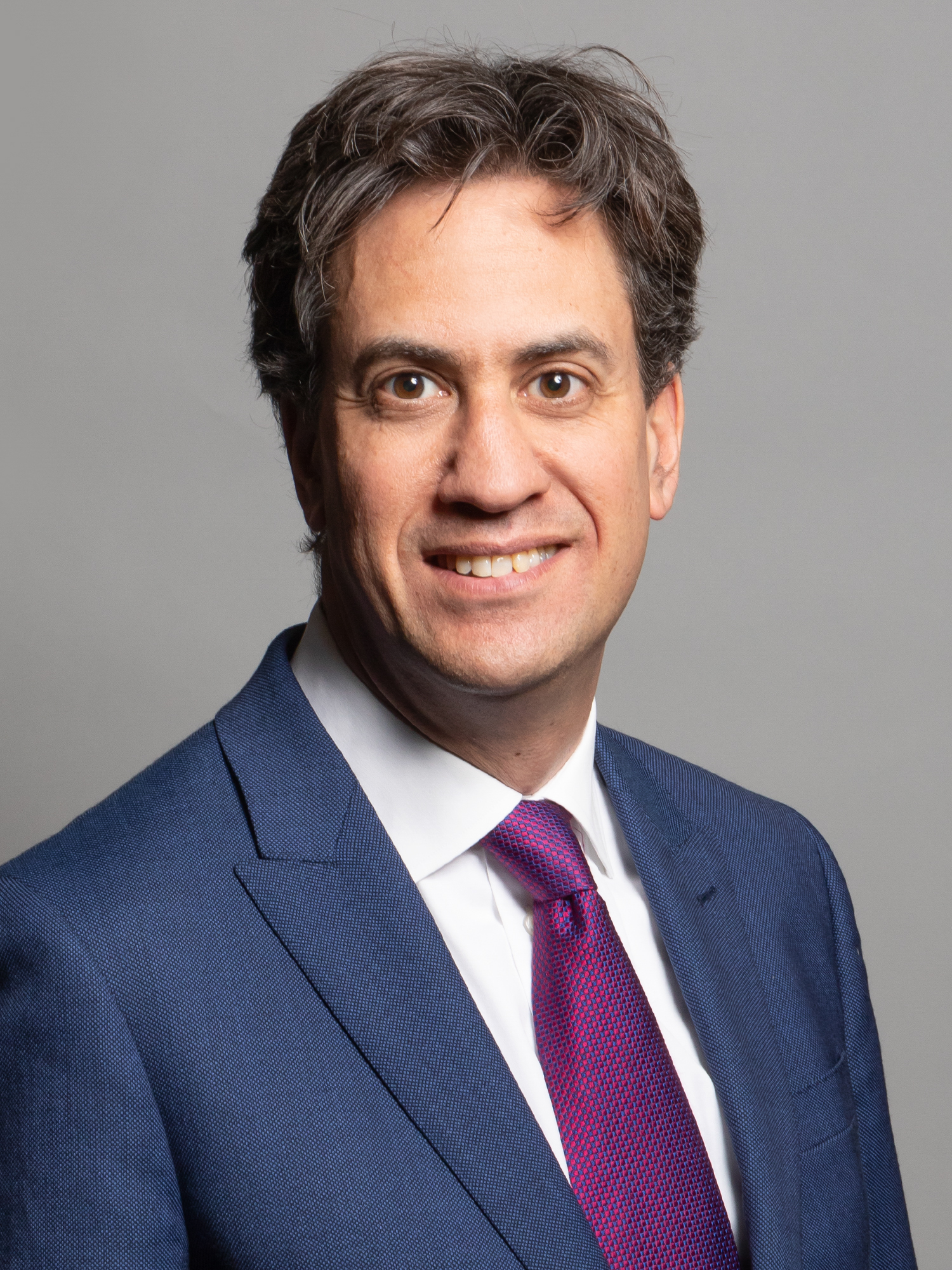
Ed Miliband (Corpus Christi College), former leader of the Labour Party

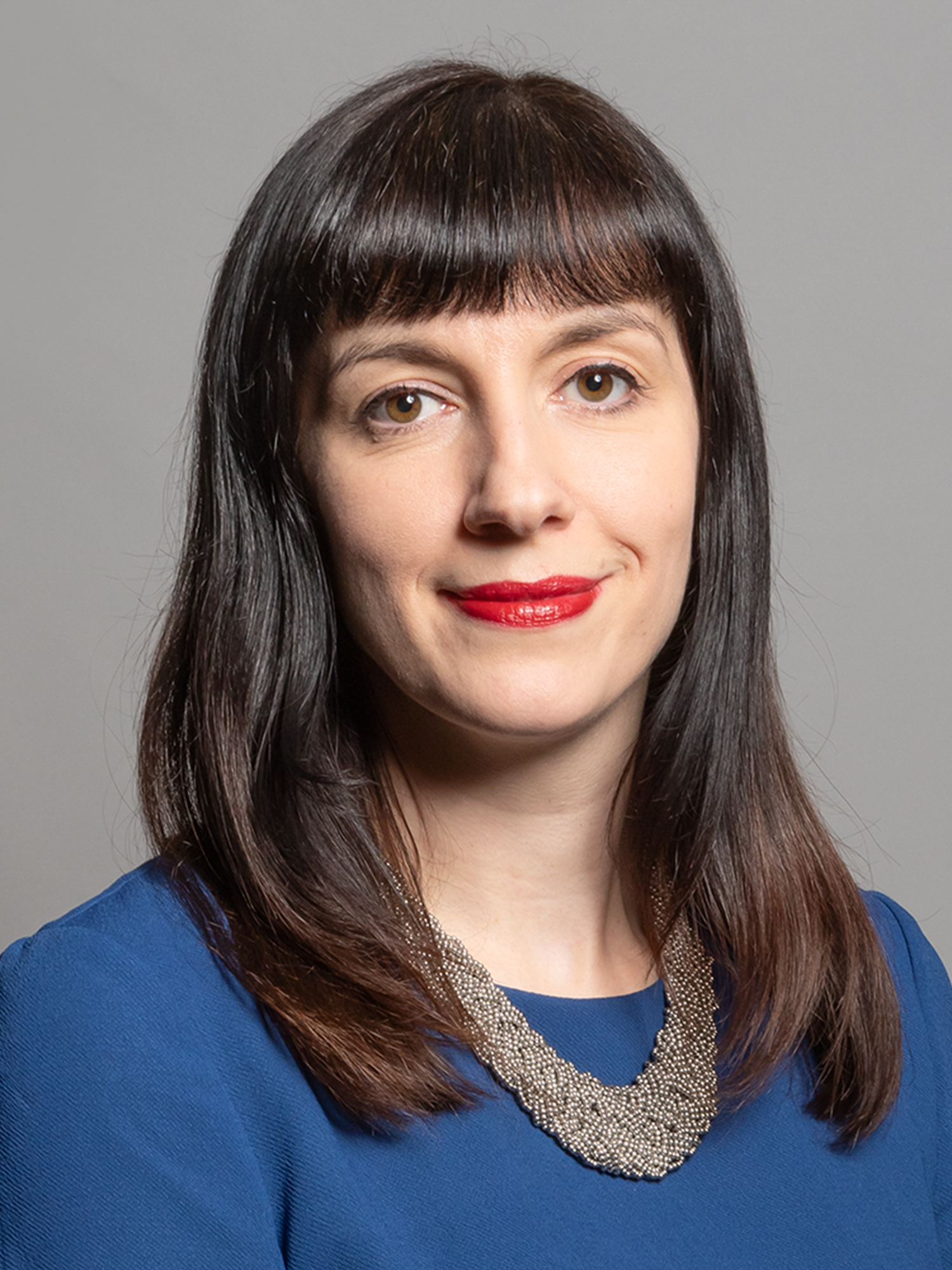
Bridget Phillipson (Hertford College), Secretary of State for Education and Minister for Women and Equalities
- Rushanara Ali, MP and associate director of the Young Foundation
- Tony Benn, former MP, former cabinet minister
- Barbara Castle, former MP, former cabinet minister and former leader of the Labour MEPs
- Richard Corbett, MEP, Leader of the Labour MEPs (EPLP)
- Richard Crossman, former MP, former cabinet minister, diarist
- Tony Crosland, former MP, former cabinet minister
- Anneliese Dodds DBE, MP, former Shadow Chancellor
- Helena Dollimore, MP
- Michael Foot, former MP and former Leader of the Labour Party
- Georgia Gould, MP, Minister of State for School Standards
- Christopher Hitchens, author, journalist and socialist thinker
- Anthony Howard, journalist
- Billy Hughes, former MP and principal of Ruskin College
- Chris Huhne, MP and former Secretary of State for Energy and Climate Change
- Roy Jenkins, former MP, former Chancellor of the Exchequer, President of the European Commission, co-founder of Social Democratic Party
- Oliver Kamm, writer and journalist
- David Lewis, former Leader of the New Democratic Party of Canada
- David Marquand, former MP, academic, President of the society in 1957
- Keir Mather, MP, Parliamentary Under-Secretary of State for Aviation, Maritime and Decarbonisation
- Martin McCluskey, MP, Parliamentary Under-Secretary of State for Energy Consumers
- David Miliband, MP, former cabinet minister
- Ed Miliband, MP, former cabinet minister and former Labour party leader
- Austin Mitchell, MP
- Iris Murdoch, writer
- Rupert Murdoch, media tycoon
- Bridget Phillipson, MP, Secretary of State for Education and Minister for Women and Equalities
- Sir Julian Priestley, former Secretary General of the European Parliament
- Bill Rodgers, MP, former cabinet minister
- Andrew Smith, MP, former cabinet minister
- Howard K. Smith, American TV news journalist and anchor
- Shirley Williams, MP, former cabinet minister, first female President of OULC in 1950
- Bilawal Bhutto Zardari, Chairman of the Pakistan Peoples Party

== List of previous co-chairs ==
=== Key ===
- All Souls
- Balliol
- Brasenose
- Christ Church
- Corpus Christi
- Exeter
- Green Templeton
- Harris Manchester
- Hertford
- Jesus
- Keble
- Kellogg
- Lady Margaret Hall
- Linacre
- Lincoln
- Magdalen
- Mansfield
- Merton
- New College
- Nuffield
- Oriel
- Pembroke
- Queen's
- Regent's Park
- Somerville
- St Anne's
- St Antony's
- St Catherine's
- St Cross
- St Edmund Hall
- St Hilda's
- St Hugh's
- St John's
- St Peter's
- Trinity
- University
- Wadham
- Wolfson
- Worcester

=== 1950–1960 ===
Year	Michaelmas	Hilary	Trinity
1950–51	Shirley Catlin		M W Smart
1951–52	H Near		Oleg Kerensky
1952–53	M H Jones		
1953–54		H Middleton	Jeremy Isaacs
1954–55	Anthony Howard	Ruth Finnegan	
1955–56			
1956–57			
1957–58		John Horsfield	
1958–59		Dennis Potter	
1959–60			

=== 1990–2000 ===
Year	Michaelmas	Hilary	Trinity
1996–97			Jessica Spearman
1997–98	Sarah Atkinson		
1998–99	Andrew Chidgey		
1999–00	Andrew Small	Joel Brookfield	John Craig

=== 2000–2010 ===
Year	Michaelmas	Hilary	Trinity
2000–01	Anneliese Dodds; Daniel Paskins	Ellie Reeves	Ben Harris; Kat Overton
2001–02	Karim Palant	Julian Hudson; Sophia Woodley	Mark Goodsell; Andrew Thomas
2002–03	Nicky Ellis; Peter Morton	Oliver Kempton; Heather Pipe	James Cloyne
2003–04	Rebecca Wilkinson	Greg Hilditch; Bridget Phillipson	Tim Flatman; Joe Taylor
2004–05	Max Schmid; Dan Simpson	Stephen Longden	Alex Brodkin
2005–06	Jack Graves; Martin McCluskey	Niklas Albin Svensson	Nicky Blair; Phil Patterson
2006–07	Simon Latham; Emily Richards	Georgia Gould; Thom Greenwood	Mark Baker; Luke Sherlock
2007–08	Kieran Hutchinson; Harriet Myles	Alice Taylor; Stuart Tooley	David Green; Sarah Hutchinson
2008–09	Vincent Romanelli; Daniel Wilson	Scott Seamons	Jamie Susskind; Jacob Turner
2009–10	Ayo Ajanaku; Ben Lyons	Charlotte Carnegie; Hannah Cusworth	Sam Burt; Alistair Strathern

=== 2010–2020 ===
Year	Michaelmas	Hilary	Trinity
2010–11	Stephen Bush; Kieran Cunnigham	Jack Evans; Kat Shields	Lincoln Hill
2011–12	Colin S. Jackson; Nicola Sugden	Thomas Adams; David Butler	Anthony Breach; Kevin Feeney
2012–13	Grace Pollard; Claire Smith	Joe Collin; Adam Whiley	Alex Graham; Jonathan Metzer
2013–14	Helena Dollimore; Aled Jones	Daniel Turner; Henry Zeffman	Felix Light; Orla Oakey
2014–15	Charlie Atkins; Nikhil Venkatesh	David Cesar-Heymann; Hannah Lovell	Madalena Leao; Loughlan O'Doherty
2015–16	David Klemperer; Kate Welsh	Alex Chalmers; Noni Csogor	Eleanor Ormsby; David Parton
2016–17	Tom Turner; Tom Wadsworth	Lucas Bertholdi-Saad; Katie Oldham	Hannah Taylor; Tom Zagoria
2017–18	Zoe Hodge; Iris Kaye-Smith	Lizzy Diggins; Keir Mather	Anisha Faruk; Ray Williams
2018–19	Charlotte Austin; Francesca Best	Rosie Sourbut; Owen Winter	Grace Davies; Arya Tandon
2019–20	Megan Howells; Jay Staker	Euan Huey; Lottie Sellers	Ali Al-Zubaidi; Connie Bostock

=== 2020–present ===
Year	Michaelmas	Hilary	Trinity
2020–21	Sophie Heath; Matthew Kayanja	Sofia Cotterill; Zed Nott	Laura Ennis; Danial Hussain
2021–22	Olly Boyland; Anjali Kawa	Amy Field; Danny Leach	Hari Bravery; Maia Hamilton
2022–23	Madelaine Cooke; Isabella Simpson	Ella Staddon	Ali Khosravi; Nidhi Madhani
2023–24	Thripty Dutt; James Melia	Rose Harris; Aaron McIntyre	Elinor Clare; Jack Hurrell
2024–25	Niamh Balroop; Thomas Taborn	Akshita Anand; Joseph Thomas	Mhairi Beken; Hattie Simpson
2025-26	Jack Leader; Willow Parker	Freya Cushman; Harry Aldridge	Melodi Doğru; Seth Olner
2026-27	Tom Haydon; Catherine Harrison	Awab Kennedy; Gabriella Bedford	

== See also ==
- Cambridge University Labour Club
- Oxford University Liberal Democrats
- Oxford University Conservative Association
- The October Club
- Oxford Union

== References and notes ==
- Smith, Cameron (1989). Unfinished Journey: The Lewis Family. Toronto: Summerhill Press. ISBN 0-929091-04-3.
