= Richard Corbett =

Former Leader of the European Parliamentary Labour Party

Richard Corbett CBE
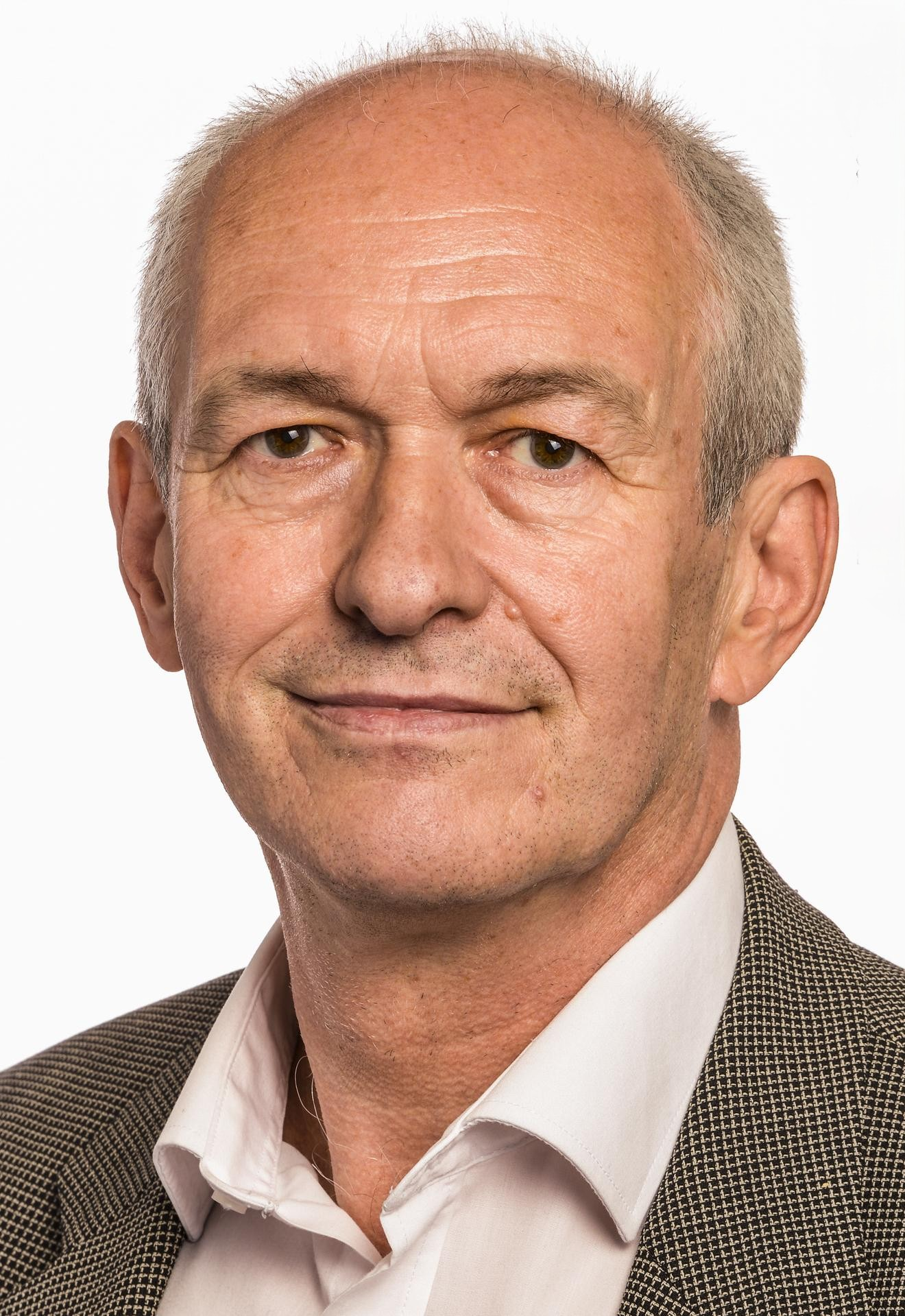
- Official portrait, 2019

Leader of the European Parliamentary Labour Party
- In office 25 October 2017 – 31 January 2020
- Deputy: Seb Dance
- General Secretary: Stephen Pearse
- Chair: Theresa Griffin
- Leader: Jeremy Corbyn
- Preceded by: Glenis Willmott
- Succeeded by: Position abolished

Member of the European Parliament for Yorkshire and the Humber
- In office 1 July 2014 – 31 January 2020
- Preceded by: Andrew Brons
- Succeeded by: Constituency abolished
- In office 20 July 1999 – 13 July 2009
- Preceded by: Constituency established
- Succeeded by: Andrew Brons

Member of the European Parliament for Merseyside West
- In office 23 December 1996 – 19 July 1999
- Preceded by: Kenneth Stewart
- Succeeded by: Constituency abolished

Personal details
- Born: Richard Graham Corbett; 6 January 1955 (age 71) Southport, England
- Party: Labour
- Education: Trinity College, Oxford; University of Hull
- Website: Official website

Richard Graham Corbett CBE (born 6 January 1955) is a former British politician who served as the final Leader of the European Parliamentary Labour Party (EPLP), from 2017 to 2020.

He was for decades one of the leading political and academic participants in the debates over British membership of the EU and of reforming the EU. His contributions to reforming the European Parliament were such that a book on prominent British MEPs suggested that "No single MEP did more to significantly increase the (European Parliament's) powers, standing and efficiency".

He was a Member of the European Parliament (MEP) for Merseyside West from 1996 to 1999 (under the system that predated the proportional representation regional system) and then for Yorkshire and the Humber from 1999 to 2009, when he lost his seat, and again from 2014 to 2020. As Labour Leader in the European Parliament, he attended Shadow Cabinet meetings and was a member of the Labour Party's National Executive Committee, where he played a key role in Labour's decision to back a second referendum on Brexit once the actual terms of the Brexit deal were known.

Between January 2010 and February 2014, Corbett was an advisor to the first full-time and long-term President of the European Council, Herman Van Rompuy. In this capacity, and as a frequent writer and commentator on European affairs, he was voted by a panel of retired diplomats, journalists, academics and think-tankers on 14 November 2012 as the fourth most influential Briton on EU policy, ahead of the Prime Minister.

In 2003, Corbett became the first MEP to write a regular personal blog, and in 2015 he became the first British politician to develop and release a phone app.

== Education ==
Corbett was born in Southport, Lancashire, to parents of working-class background from Wales and London. He attended primary school at Farnborough Road School in Southport. When his father was offered a post as a statistician at the World Health Organization, the family moved to Geneva, Switzerland, and Corbett attended the International School of Geneva (attended at the time mostly by children from UN Agencies in Geneva), where he obtained the International Baccalaureate. He was captain of the football team and also played for the junior team of a Swiss second division club.

He won a place at Trinity College, Oxford, the first generation of his family to be able to go to university, and obtained a degree in Philosophy, Politics and Economics. He was the Secretary of the Labour Club and chairman of the Oxford Committee for Europe. He co-ordinated the Oxford student 'Yes' campaign in the 1975 referendum on membership of the European Community. He also skied for Oxford against Cambridge.

Corbett later completed a doctorate in political science at the University of Hull.

== Political career ==
=== Before the European Parliament ===
Richard Corbett's activities in the European Students at Oxford led on to him being elected first to the youth board of the European Movement in Britain and then to the international presidency of the youth wing of the European Movement and of the Union of European Federalists, the Young European Federalists (JEF), a post he held from 1979 to 1981, drafting their manifesto, which was the first to coin the phrase "democratic deficit" in relation to the European Parliament's then lack of power over European legislation.

Corbett was secretary-general of the European Co-ordination Bureau of International Non-Governmental Youth Organisations from 1977 to 1981, representing youth organisations in the Council of Europe's European Youth Foundation and European Youth Centre. He also helped to set up the Youth Forum of the European Communities, the predecessor of the European Youth Forum, and represented Western European youth organisations in negotiations with Eastern European organisations pursuant to the Helsinki Treaty (as well as at the World Festival of Youth and Students in Havana in 1978, along with Charles Clarke and Peter Mandelson). He worked with Altiero Spinelli MEP on the latter's proposal for a draft treaty establishing a European Union, adopted by the European Parliament in 1984.

Before being elected to the European Parliament, Corbett worked in the voluntary sector and as a civil servant, later becoming a policy advisor to and then Deputy Secretary General of the Socialist Group in the European Parliament. He worked on drafting the parts of the treaties of Maastricht and Amsterdam that increased the powers of the Parliament, notably helping to draft the "codecision procedure" which now applies for adopting European legislation through successive readings of the Parliament and the Council.

In 1992, Corbett was made Ambassador of Goodwill of the US State of Arkansas, by its then Governor Bill Clinton.

=== First Period as a Member of the European Parliament ===
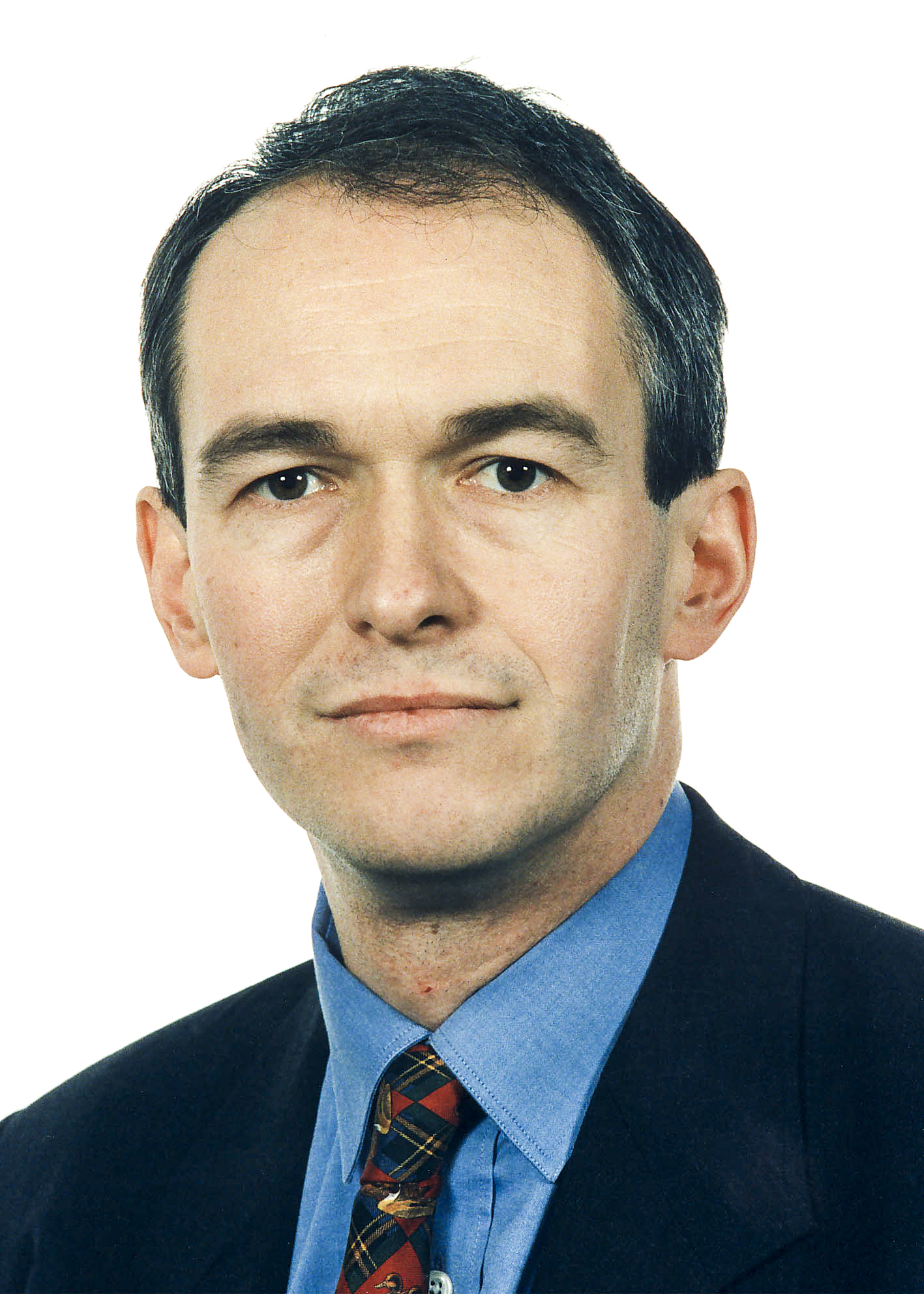
Official portrait, 1994

Corbett was a member of the Parliament's Constitutional Affairs committee and from 1999 to 2009 was the spokesman for the Labour Party, as well as the whole of the wider Group of the Party of European Socialists, on European constitutional affairs. In 2006, he was elected Deputy Leader of the European Parliamentary Labour Party, which he remained until the end of his first period as an MEP, declining (to some surprise) to challenge for the leadership when Gary Titley stood down in 2008.

In 2003, his proposals to re-write the European Parliament's Rules of Procedure were largely accepted. In 2004–2005, he was the co-rapporteur (with Iñigo Méndez de Vigo) for Parliament on the Treaty establishing a constitution for Europe. This report formed the basis of Parliament's official position on the treaty, which he was then invited to present to several national parliaments.

In 2005, he was appointed as Parliament's negotiator (along with Joseph Daul MEP) to broker a new system of parliamentary scrutiny over Commission implementing measures (under the previously much-criticised "comitology" procedure), which led to an agreement among the Council of ministers, the Commission and the Parliament in 2006 giving Parliament the right to veto quasi-legislative implementing measures. This represented a major increase in Parliament's powers over the Commission.

In 2007–08, he was again co-rapporteur with Iñigo Méndez de Vigo for Parliament on the Treaty of Lisbon, (which replaced the constitutional treaty after two member states had declined to ratify it) and was again rapporteur for a new overhaul of Parliament's procedures in 2009 and, after his five years out of the Parliament (see below), in 2016 and 2018.

Corbett was a strong advocate of EU reform, with a particular interest in improving democratic accountability by continuing to increase the European Parliament's power within the EU institutional system. Professor Juliet Lodge of Leeds University has named Corbett as one of five "movers and shakers" in the European Parliament who "have brought the European Parliament from being a mere talking shop to a legislature with genuine power".

Corbett's voting record and other parliamentary activities can be found on the VoteWatch website.

=== Five years out of the European Parliament ===
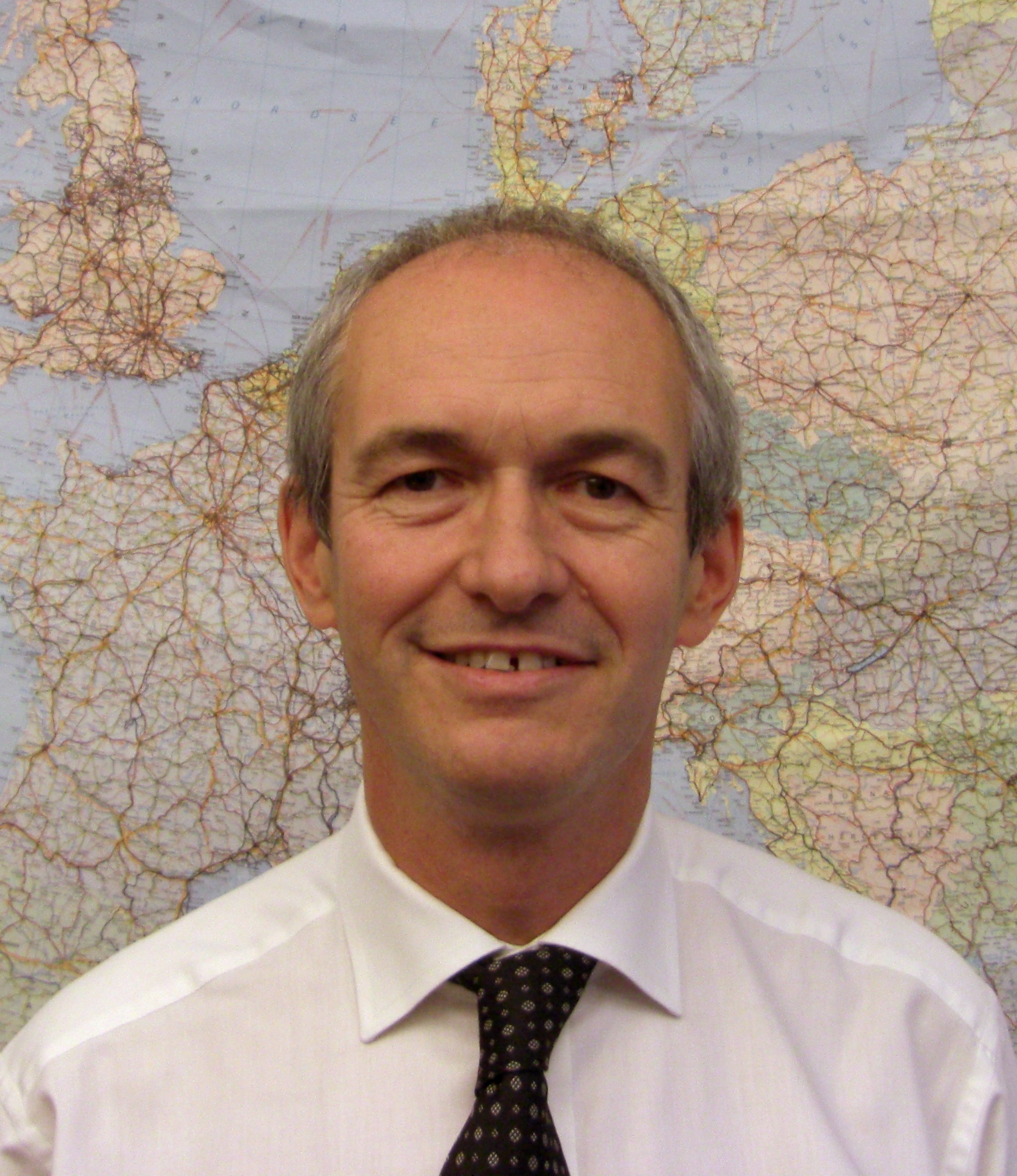
Corbett in 2008

Corbett lost his seat in the 2009 European Parliament elections, which saw a big fall in the Labour share of the vote in the wake of the Westminster expenses scandal. The BNP took the seat. The BBC website carried the following comment from their European editor, Mark Mardell:

"The saddest moment of the night: Labour MEP Richard Corbett lost his seat. Irrespective of party politics, there are some people who are good for politics as a whole. Mr Corbett, a decent, thoughtful politician, is also one of the few people who understand how the European Parliament actually works and explained it well. He'll be missed on all sides of the chamber".

Mark Mardell had previously referred to Richard Corbett as:

"an example of a conscientious and hard working politician if ever there was one".

After his defeat, Corbett spent two months in Ireland from August to October 2009 helping (behind the scenes) the "Yes" campaign in the second Irish referendum on the Lisbon Treaty, in which 67% of the 59% turnout voted in favour.

In December 2009, Corbett was invited to join the private office (cabinet) of the first full-time President of the European Council, Herman Van Rompuy, as his advisor on constitutional issues, but also handling his relations with the European Parliament and national parliaments, with the European Committee of the Regions and the European Economic and Social Committee as well as helping on relations with some governments, including the UK.

=== Return to the European Parliament ===
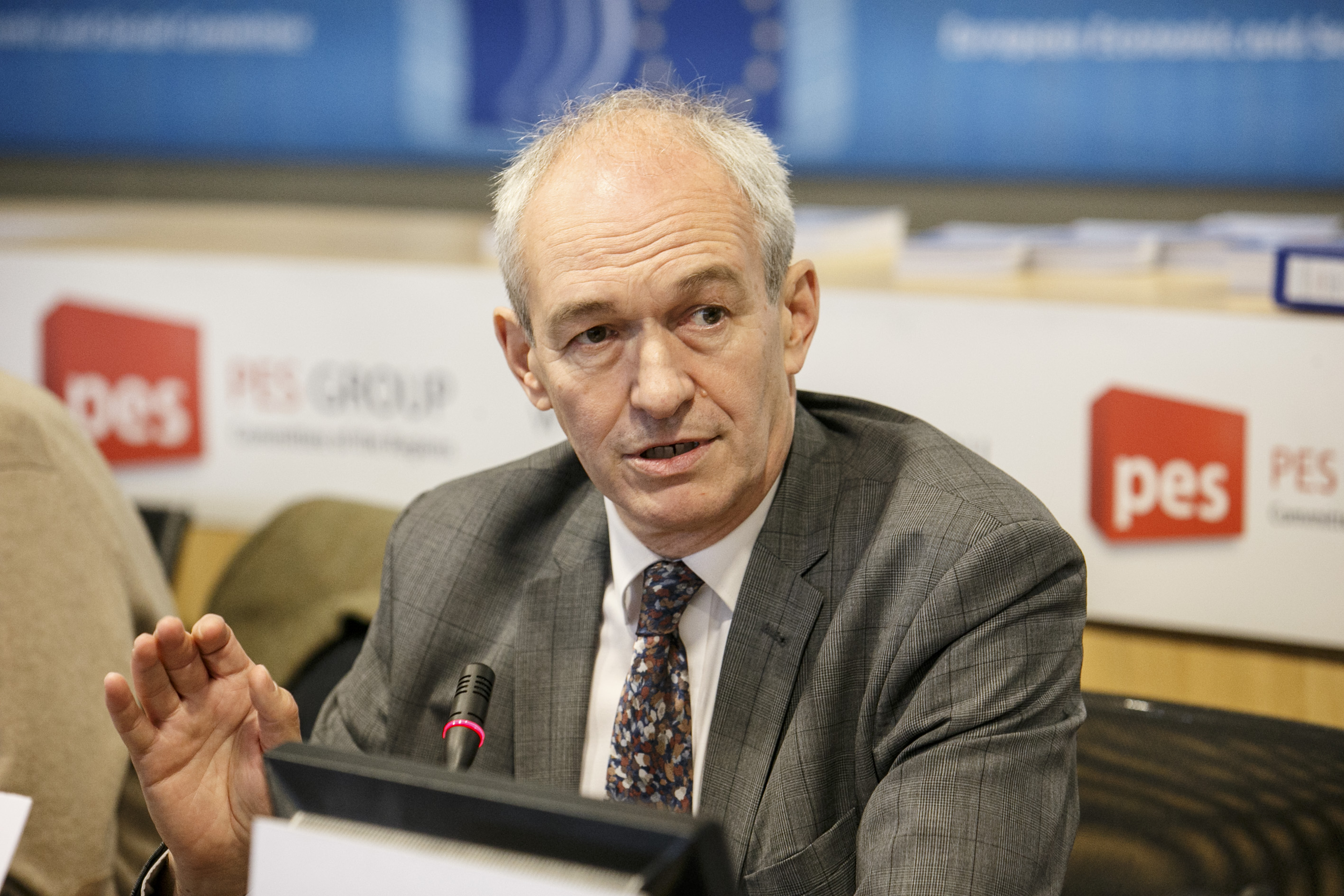
Corbett in 2016

Corbett left the Van Rompuy cabinet in March 2014, in order to stand for election in the 2014 European Parliament elections as the Labour party's second candidate in Yorkshire & Humber. In Labour's internal ballot of party members to choose their candidates, Corbett came first (with the highest proportion of first preference votes of all new candidates in the country) securing him second spot on the list of Labour candidates, behind the sitting MEP Linda McAvan. Labour won two seats in the election in Yorkshire, and so Corbett was returned to the Parliament.

In Parliament, Corbett returned to the Constitutional Committee and served also on the Fisheries Committee (as a full member) and the Economic Committee (as a substitute). He was elected again as Deputy Leader of the Labour MEPs in September 2014. He was again rapporteur for a new overhaul of Parliament's procedures in 2016 and 2018–19. On 25 October 2017 he was elected Leader of the Labour MEPs (EPLP) following the retirement of Glenis Willmott, defeating Siôn Simon and Clare Moody in the vote.

As Leader of the EPLP, Corbett was a member of the Labour Party NEC and attended Shadow Cabinet. In these roles, he was heavily engaged in the internal party discussions that eventually led to Labour calling for a new referendum on Brexit. He spoke at some of the large marches in London and elsewhere calling for a peoples' vote on the final Brexit deal, on the grounds that Brexit was turning out to be very different from what the Leave campaign had promised.

In advance of the United Kingdom European Union membership referendum, Corbett launched an app called Doorstep EU for IPhone and Android in order to debunk myths about the EU, deliver authoritative briefings on key issues and detailed statistics of the EU's impact on the United Kingdom.

He supported Yvette Cooper in the 2015 Labour Party leadership election, Owen Smith in the 2016 election, and Keir Starmer in the 2020 election.

=== After Brexit ===
In 2021-22, the European Parliament asked Corbett to represent it in the Common Secretariat running the Conference on the Future of Europe, while simultaneously being Deputy chef de cabinet to the Secretary General of the European Parliament.

In 2023, the S&D Group in the European Parliament asked him to be one of three experts to carry out an independent inquiry into the Qatargate scandal. As the Belgian judicial investigation was still on-going, the inquiry could not trespass on its work, so it instead focussed on weaknesses in the rules and practices of the EU, the European Parliament and the S&D Group that might have made inappropriate interference in the work of the Parliament more easy. Their report made a number of recommendations and those that required changes to the Parliament's Rules of Procedure and the Code of Conduct for Members were subsequently taken up and largely adopted by the Parliament in the autumn of 2023.

Now retired, Corbett has continued to speak and write about European affairs. He authored the primer booklet "The Progressive Potential of the EU" that is being used for training of candidates and activists of the Party of European Socialists in the 2024 European elections.

== Other activities ==
=== Richard Corbett versus the UK Independence Party ===
Richard Corbett was an early critic of the United Kingdom Independence Party (UKIP).

In June 2004, he drew attention, in The Independent newspaper, to UKIP links with the far-right British National Party in that year's local elections: "In Yorkshire, where both the BNP and UKIP put up candidates, they appear to have come to an arrangement not to stand against one another".

Richard Corbett's pamphlet 25 Things You Didn't Know When You Voted For UKIP.

Following Ashley Mote's imprisonment in September 2007 for fraud, Corbett called on the government to change the law which allowed the former UKIP MEP to be paid in full during his spell in jail. The Minister responsible for payment of MEPs (and MPs), Harriet Harman, promised to look into the matter.

Corbett continued to campaign vigorously against the UK Independence Party in the run-up to the 2014 European elections. After they secured the biggest share of the vote in these elections, he subsequently wrote "I think it is a mistake to focus exclusively on UKIP's racism. That unsavoury side of UKIP has been adequately exposed by others [...] We need to expose them on their policies".

=== Sports policy ===
In 2006, Corbett served on the Independent European Sport Review, set up by several national governments and UEFA and chaired by the former Portuguese Deputy Prime Minister Jose Luis Arnaut. The review was in fact about the governance of football, and Corbett chaired the sub-group on political aspects. The review paved the way for a number of changes introduced by UEFA, among them the UEFA Financial Fair Play Regulations. Corbett has maintained an interest in the governance of football ever since, taking up a number of issues with UEFA.

=== Grimethorpe Colliery Band ===
Corbett is the Honorary President of the Grimethorpe Colliery Band, a brass band based in Grimethorpe, South Yorkshire. The band achieved worldwide fame after appearing in the film Brassed Off, as well as becoming (along with Black Dyke Mills Band), the first brass band to perform at the Proms.

=== Labour Party positions ===
Corbett has held a number of offices in the UK Labour Party. As well as being Deputy Leader and, from October 2017 until Brexit, Leader of the European Parliamentary Labour Party (EPLP), he served on the Regional Board for Yorkshire and the party's National Policy Forum, a position to which he was re-elected by fellow Labour MEPs in May 2014. He was national chair of the Labour Movement for Europe from 2009 to 2011, and subsequently served as one of its Labour MEP representatives.

As Leader of the EPLP, Corbett was a member of the National Executive Committee (NEC) of the Labour Party and attended shadow cabinet meetings.

=== Other organisations ===
Corbett is Honorary Vice President of the UK European Movement, having served as Chair following the resignation of Laura Sandys in the wake of the 2016 referendum result. He did not want to continue as Chair, citing time constraints, and handed over to Stephen Dorrell in December 2016.

=== Academic ===
Corbett was a visiting professor at the College of Europe in Bruges and on the board of the Salzburg Centre for European Union Studies (SCEUS) of the University of Salzburg.

He has written numerous academic articles and books (see 'Publications' below)

=== Publications and communications activities ===
Corbett is the co-author of the ten editions of an eponymous academic textbook on the European Parliament (now the standard reference book on it across Europe) and several other academic publications, most notably the Oxford University Press textbook "The European Union: how does it work?" (see below).

Corbett was an early user of new media. In 2003, he was the first MEP from any country to launch a blog, which he resumed in 2014 as part of his election campaign. In 2004 his website was cited as one of the most comprehensive of any British politician's by New Statesman magazine, which nominated him for a New Media award. In 2015, he became the first MEP to launch a mobile app, Doorstep EU, aimed at activists, journalists and other politicians. In the same year, he also took part in an AMA on Reddit.

Corbett starred in the docudrama film Do it like a European?, which won a prize at the international Winton Film Contest.

=== Languages ===
Corbett speaks English, French, German and Dutch.

== Personal life ==
Corbett lives in Shipley near Bradford; he formerly lived in the nearby village of Saltaire, for whose World Heritage Status he helped to campaign. As an MEP, he had his constituency office in Leeds, where he shared premises with Hilary Benn MP.

Corbett is married to Lorraine Kirkwood. He was previously married to Inge Van Gaal and Anne De Malsche. He has three children and five grandchildren.

== Publications ==
- ‘The European Union: How Does it Work?' Latest (6th) edition with Profs Daniel Kenealy and John Peterson (2022, Oxford University Press) ISBN 978-0-19-886224-6
- Corbett, Richard; Jacobs, Francis; Neville, Darren (2024), 'The European Parliament' (10 ed.), London: John Harper Publishing, ISBN 978-1-7391436-5-7. Apart from Darren Neville replacing Michael Shackleton, the same three co-authors have written every edition since the first in 1990.
- 'The Evolving Roles of the European Parliament and of National Parliaments' in ' EU Law after Lisbon' by Professors Piet Eeckhout, Andrea Biondi and Stephanie Ripley (2012, Oxford University Press) ISBN 978-0-19-964432-2
- 'Parameters of a Crisis' in 'The future of Economic Governance in the EU' (Policy Network, London, 2012)
- ‘President of the European Council, new kid on the block: asset or complication?'. In T. Christiansen, M. Shackelton and S. Vanhoonacker (eds), The European Union after the Lisbon Treaty. Maastricht: Maastricht Centre for European Governance, Maastricht Monnet Lecture Series Vol. 3 (2011).
- 'The Treaty of Maastricht: from conception to ratification' Longman - Cartermill Publishing (1993) ISBN 0-582-20906-4
- 'The European Parliament's Role in Closer European Integration', London, Macmillan (1998)ISBN 0-333-72252-3 and New York, St Martin's Press (1998) ISBN 0-312-21103-1. Reprinted in paperback by Palgrave, London (2001) ISBN 0-333-94938-2
- 'Electing Europe's First Parliament' Fabian tract, with Rod Northawl, Fabian Society, London (1977) ref no. 0307-7535. ISBN 978-0-7163-0449-4
- 'A Socialist Policy for Europe', pamphlet with Geoff Harris, introduction by the Rt Hon Denis Howell MP. London, Labour Movement for Europe (1985)
- 'Progress and Prospects' (of the draft treaty on European Union) in Juliet Lodge (ed), Foreword by Altiero Spinelli; 'European Union: The European Community in Search of a Future' London, Macmillan (1986) ISBN 0-333-39739-8
- 'The 1985 Intergovernmental Conference and the Single European Act' in Roy Pryce (ed); The Dynamics of European Union', London, Croom Helm (1987) ISBN 0-7099-4327-X
- 'Shaping European Integration. The Directly Elected European Parliament 1979-89', EU Publications Office, Luxembourg, 2024 ISBN 978-92-848-1239-4
- 'The European Parliament's new "Single Act" Powers, in 'Nieuw Europa' Magazine, year 15, nr 1 (1989), The Hague
- 'Representing the People', in A.Duff, J. Pinder and R. Pryce (eds); Maastricht and Beyond, London, Routledge (1994)
- 'The European Parliament and the Idea of European Representative Government' in John Pinder (ed), Foreword by Princess Margariet of the Netherlands; 'Foundations of Democracy in the European Union' London, Macmillan (1999) ISBN 0-333-77470-1 and New York, St Martin's Press (1999) ISBN 0-312-22296-3
- 'A Very Special Parliament: The European Parliament in the Twenty-First Century' in 'The Journal of Legislative Studies, Vol 8' (2002). Frank Cass. 1357-2334
- 'Combatting Mythology and Changing Reality: the Debate on the Future of Europe', London, Labour Movement for Europe (2003)
- 'The EU - Who makes the decisions? A guide to the process and the UK's role'. London, European Movement (2006)
- 'The European Parliament 2004-2009' in Juliet Lodge (ed), 'The 2009 elections to the European Parliament'. Palgrave macmillan 2010 ISBN 978-0-230-23040-8
- 'The Progressive Potential of the EU'. Foundation for European Progressive Studies FEPS (2022) ISBN 978-3-8012-3101-9
- 'The European Parliament and the Spitzenkandidaten Process' in Matilde Ceron, Thomas Christiansen, Dionyssis G. Dimitrakopoulos (eds) 'The Politicisation of the European Commission’s Presidency: Spitzenkandidaten and Beyond' ISBN 978-3-031-48172-7 (print) and ISBN 978-3-031-48173-4 (eBook)
- Numerous newspaper articles and articles in academic journals

Party political offices
Preceded by Glenis Willmott	Leader of the Labour Party in the European Parliament; 2017–2020	Succeeded by Position abolished
