= Outwood Academy Valley =

Location
- Valley Road; Worksop, Nottinghamshire, S81 7EN; England; 53°19′00″N 1°07′43″W

Information
- Type: Academy
- Motto: "Students First"
- Established: 1957
- Local authority: Nottinghamshire
- Trust: Outwood Grange Academies Trust
- Department for Education URN: 138247 Tables
- Ofsted: Reports
- Principal: Dave Cavill
- Gender: Mixed
- Age: 11 to 18
- Enrolment: 1,718
- Capacity: 1,700
- Colours: Purple, black and gold
- Website: valley.outwood.com

Outwood Academy Valley (formerly Valley Comprehensive School) is a mixed secondary school with academy status, located in Worksop in Nottinghamshire, England. It had an enrolment of 1,550 pupils in 2017, with a comprehensive admissions policy.

The school is operated by Outwood Grange Academies Trust, and the current principal is Dave Cavill. Alongside Outwood Academy Portland they publish a termly magazine called Outlook.

== History ==
Valley Comprehensive School was a community school operated by the Local Education Authority.

Prior to its conversion, Valley Comprehensive School was graded as an inadequate school with a Notice to Improve with 43% of students achieving the 5+A*-C measure including English and Maths in 2011, which was more than 10% below its target.

In September 2011 Outwood Grange Academies Trust began its journey with Valley Comprehensive School. The school was converted and became part of the Outwood Grange Academies Trust and was renamed Outwood Academy Valley with Rob Tarn as the Principal on 14 August 2014.

The transformation began immediately and by May 2012 Ofsted stated that the ethos of the school was so different they were going to remove the inadequate category, and grade the school as good with outstanding features. They commented that behaviour was constantly outstanding and that the outstanding leadership and management had resulted in the school making rapid progress in a short period of time. That year the school exceeded its target for the first time and achieved 68% 5+A*-C including English and maths.

The academy continued to excel in all aspects, with results the following year reaching 78% with Angela Hull as Principal. Ofsted re-visited the school in March 2014 and graded it once again as good with outstanding features. The report stated 'Outstanding leadership and management ensure that the quality of teaching and students' achievement are continually improving. In September 2014, Dr Smith became Principal at both Outwood Academy Valley and Outwood Academy Portland. Results have continued to improve and in 2015 the academy achieved a record breaking value added score demonstrating outstanding progress and achievement.

The academy received a rating of "Outstanding" from Ofsted in its latest inspection in May 2017.

== Academic tracking and reporting ==
The progress of each student is monitored through a system known as Praising Stars. This system of half-termly assessment, monitoring and intervention includes a report to parents on their child's progress in all subjects every six weeks. The academy holds three parents' evenings per year where parents/carers have the opportunity to meet subject teachers to discuss progress.

== Behaviour and discipline system ==
The academy uses a system of escalating "consequences" as a framework for discipline, beginning with C1 and ranging through to C6 (exclusion).

== Daily pastoral support ==
Students are members of mixed-age tutor groups, known as PDaG Groups, each including students from all 5-year groups at the school. This means that each group evolves every year, as older students leave and are replaced by younger students entering the school. An advantage of mixed age tutor groups is the increased sense of community, allowing for students to share experiences and foster understanding.

== Post 16 ==
On 3 September 2008 the then Worksop Post-16 Centre opened. The building is across the road from the then Valley Comprehensive School which later became Outwood Academy Valley. The Post-16 centre is operated in conjunction with Outwood Academy Portland.

== Notable former pupils ==
- Gary Bellamy, footballer
- Andrew Hadfield, slalom canoeist
- Sam Walker, table tennis player
- Lee Westwood, golfer

Liam Palmer, footballer

== See also ==
- HMS Bentinck – shared the school's former name
- Outwood Grange Family of Schools - the academy trust of which the school is a member of
