= Glenis Willmott =

British Labour politician (born 1951)

Dame Glenis Willmott DBE
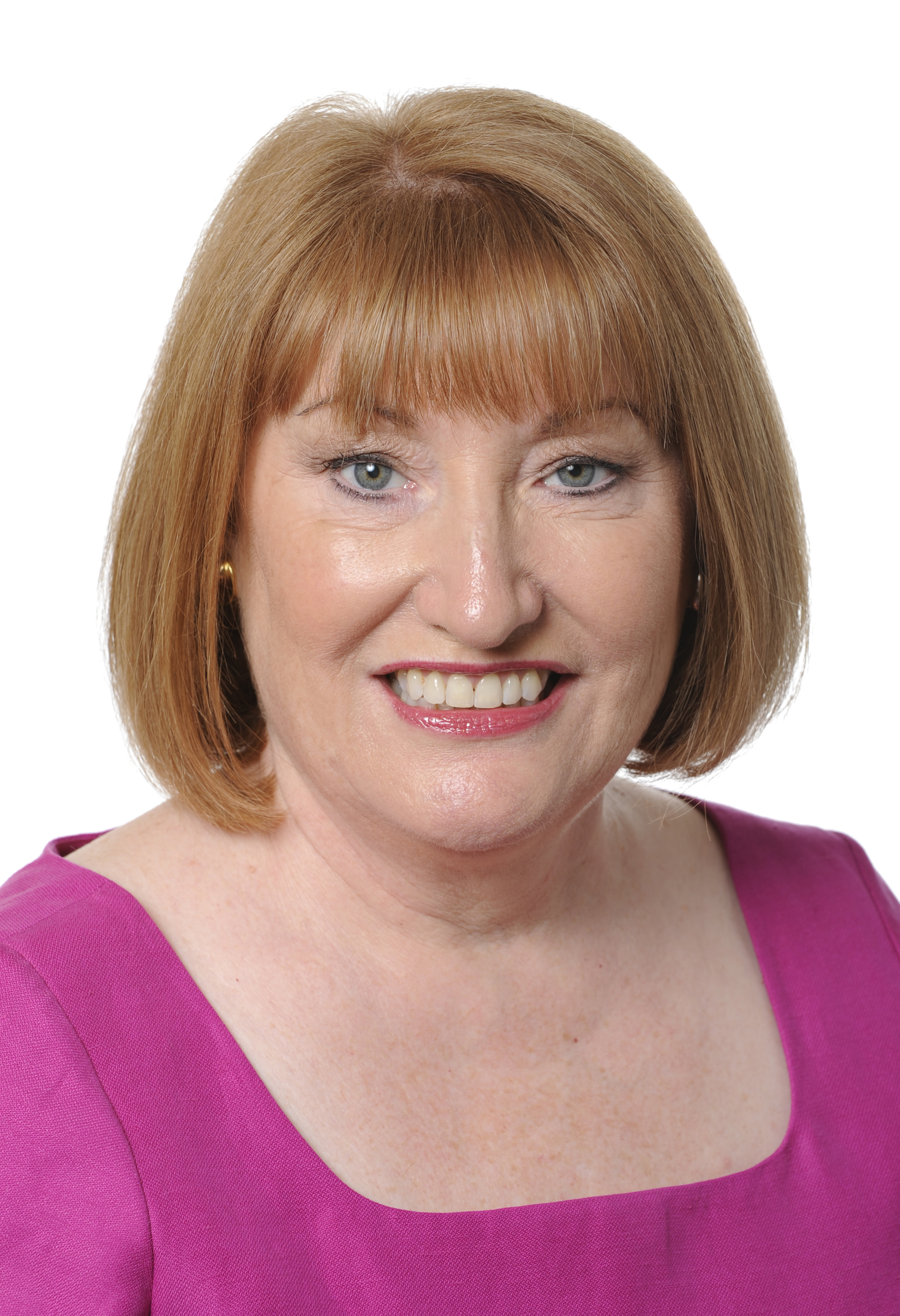
- Official portrait, 2007

Leader of the European Parliamentary Labour Party
- In office 18 January 2009 – 3 October 2017
- Deputy: Richard Corbett
- Leader: Gordon Brown; Harriet Harman (acting); Ed Miliband; Harriet Harman (acting); Jeremy Corbyn
- Preceded by: Gary Titley
- Succeeded by: Richard Corbett

Member of the European Parliament for the East Midlands
- In office 1 January 2006 – 3 October 2017
- Preceded by: Phillip Whitehead
- Succeeded by: Rory Palmer

Personal details
- Born: Glenis Scott; 4 March 1951 (age 75) Horden, County Durham, England
- Party: Labour
- Education: Trent Polytechnic
- Profession: Medical scientist

Dame Glenis Willmott, DBE (née Scott; born 4 March 1951) is a British retired Labour Party politician who served as leader of the European Parliamentary Labour Party (EPLP) and as a Member of the European Parliament for the East Midlands.

== Early life and career ==
Willmott was born in the mining village of Horden, County Durham, but moved to Mansfield with her family at the age of 10. She was educated in Mansfield and at Trent Polytechnic where she obtained an HNC in medical science. She worked as a medical scientist for the National Health Service at King's Mill and Mansfield Hospitals from 1969 to 1990.

She was chair of Mansfield Constituency Labour Party and a member of Nottinghamshire County Council for the Leeming and Forest Town division from 1989 to 1993. She also worked as an assistant to Alan Meale (Member of Parliament for Mansfield) from 1987 to 1990.

In 1990, she became political officer for the GMB trade union's Midland and East Coast region. She served as chair of the East Midlands Regional Labour Party and was second on the Labour Party list of candidates for the East Midlands region at the 2004 elections to the European Parliament. According to the Palestine Solidarity Campaign, as of 2010 Willmott was a member of the Labour Friends of Israel and has served as vice-chair.

== Member of the European Parliament ==
On 1 January 2006, she replaced Phillip Whitehead as a member of the European Parliament for the East Midlands following his death. Along with other Labour MEPs, Willmott was part of the Progressive Alliance of Socialists and Democrats Group in the European Parliament.

In July 2006 she was elected to the position of Chief Whip of the Labour MEPs, a position she held until January 2009 when she was elected as the Leader of the European Parliamentary Labour Party (EPLP), replacing Gary Titley, who had resigned the post. She was the longest-serving leader of the EPLP, surpassing Barbara Castle and Gary Titley.

In September 2014, Willmott was appointed rapporteur for changes to medical devices legislation primarily triggered by scandals involving PIP breast implants and 'metal-on-metal' hip replacements. In October 2014, she received the Outstanding Leadership Award from the Belgian Association of Clinical Research Professionals for her work on clinical trials legislation. She also hosted an S&D event at the Espace Léopold focused on improved labelling of alcoholic drinks.

=== Membership of Committees and Delegations ===
Following the 2014 election, Willmott sat (or was a substitute) on the following Committees and Delegations:

- Member of the Committee on the Environment, Public Health and Food Safety.
- Member of the Delegation for relations with Canada.
- Substitute on the Committee on Employment and Social Affairs.
- Substitute on the Delegation for relations with Switzerland, Norway and Iceland.

=== 2014 election campaign ===
In May 2014, Willmott launched her East Midlands campaign for the 2014 European Parliament election in Derby, "promising to help people struggling with the cost of living". She said the Conservative Party wanted to help energy companies and bankers. "We don't know what [aspects of EU membership] David Cameron will renegotiate or when he will do it. ... Nearly 340,000 East Midlands jobs are dependent on us being in [the EU]. A [EU] referendum would just be a distraction when we are trying to grow the economy." She also claimed UKIP's stated objective of "cutting red tape" were really about "cutting people's rights at work". In the East Midlands, where five seats were contested, Labour retained Willmott's seat and increased their share of the vote by 8%, narrowly missing out on gaining a second seat in the region.

=== 2016 EU referendum ===
Willmott opposed David Cameron's decision to call the referendum on the UK's membership of the EU, and played a prominent role in Labour In for Britain, Labour's campaign for Britain to remain in the EU. She was critical of Cameron's proposed reforms to the EU, including changes to legislation on workers' rights, product standards and environmental protections. She argued that the five key arguments for remaining a member of the EU were on job protection and creation, employment rights, protections for consumers, cross-border security and increased influence on the world stage.

Following the UK's vote to leave the EU, Willmott argued that if the deal reached during the Brexit negotiations led to extensive deregulation and weakening of social and workers' rights, then Labour ought to oppose it. In the aftermath of the referendum result, she wrote a letter on behalf of the EPLP to Jeremy Corbyn calling for his resignation as Leader of the Labour Party after a party briefing document appeared to promote the work of Kate Hoey and Gisela Stuart, two key MPs in the rival Labour Leave campaign.

=== Retirement ===
Willmott announced in July 2017 that she would stand down in October and was formally replaced as MEP for the East Midlands by Leicester city councillor Rory Palmer on 3 October. She was replaced as Leader of the EPLP by her colleague Richard Corbett. She was honoured with a 'thank you' dinner on 4 November 2017 which celebrated her career and contribution to the Labour Party and European politics; the dinner was attended by Corbyn and former leader Ed Miliband.

== Personal life ==
Willmott lives in Leicestershire with her husband Ted. She was appointed a Dame Commander of the Order of the British Empire (DBE) in the 2015 Dissolution Honours on 27 August 2015.

Party political offices
| Preceded by Gary Titley | Leader of the European Parliamentary Labour Party; 2009–2017 | Succeeded by Richard Corbett |
| Preceded by Michael Cashman | European Parliamentary representative on the National Executive Committee of the Labour Party; 2012 – 2017 | Succeeded by Richard Corbett |
| Preceded by Paddy Lillis | Chair of the Labour Party; 2016 – 2017 | Succeeded by Andy Kerr |
