= Andrew Hadfield =

British slalom canoeist (born 1984)

Andrew Hadfield (born 1984) is a former British slalom canoeist who competed from 1999 to 2012 in K1 individual and team events.

He represented Great Britain at senior level in 2006, 2007 and 2008 alongside Campbell Walsh and Richard Hounslow winning Team Gold in 2007 at Foz do Iguaçu, Brazil and finishing 14th at the 2008 European Canoe Slalom Championships in Kraków, Poland.

He also represented Great Britain at U23 level in 2004, 2006 and 2007, was British U18 Champion in 2002, U23 Champion in 2006 and 2007, British Universities Champion in 2006 and 2009 and Inter Services and RAF Champion in 2011.

After three GB Olympic Selection campaigns in 2004, 2008 and 2012, he retired from competitive sport before pursuing a flying career with the RAF and more recently within the private sector.

== Personal and early life ==
He was born in Worksop attending Prospect Hill Junior school and later Valley Comprehensive School before graduating with an Economics degree from Loughborough University.

In 2016 he was awarded the Diamond Jubilee Scholarship Award by The Honorable Company of Air Pilots.
