= Rory Palmer =

British politician (born 1981)

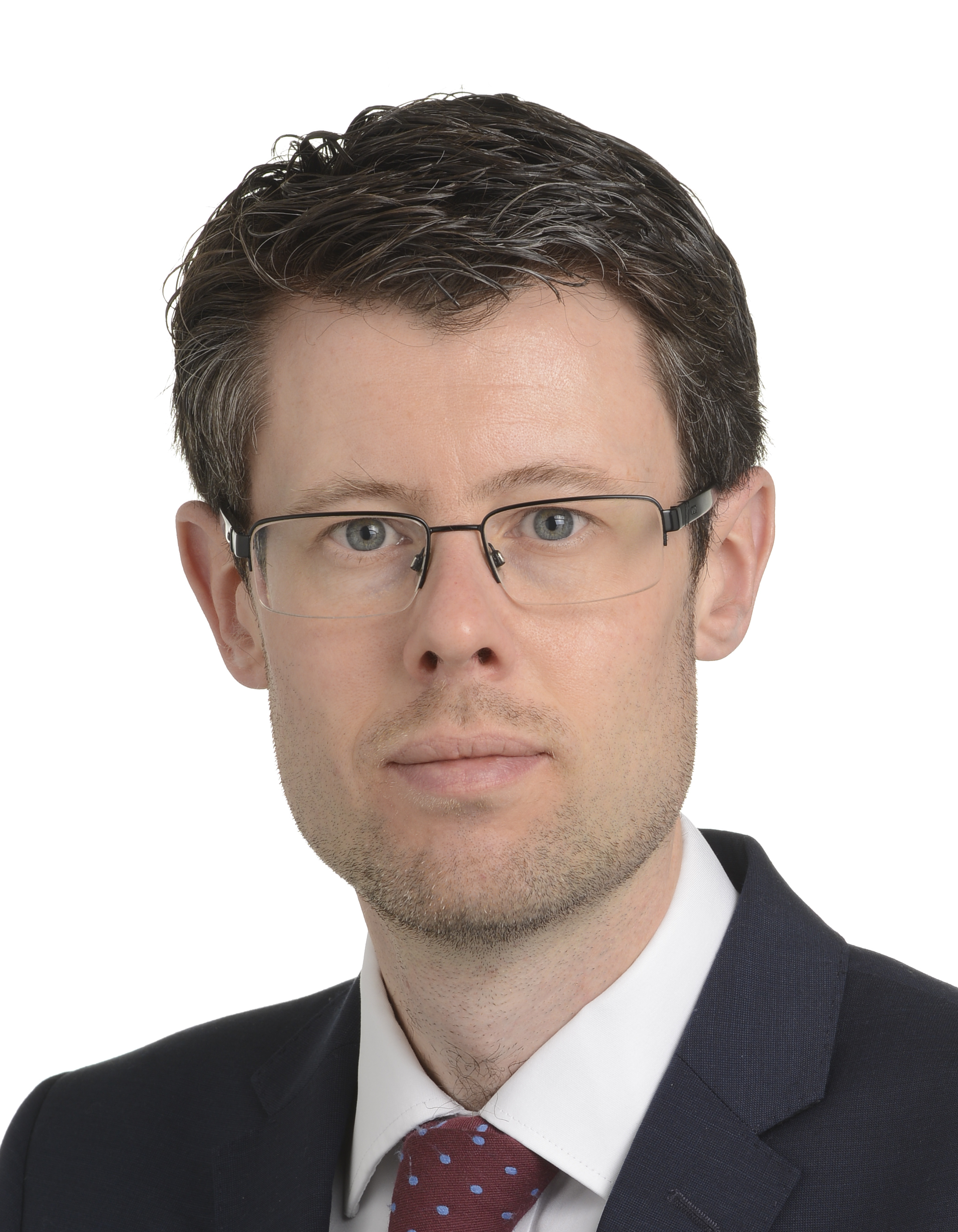

Member of the European Parliament for the East Midlands
- In office 3 October 2017 – 31 January 2020
- Preceded by: Glenis Willmott
- Succeeded by: Office abolished

Deputy Mayor of Leicester
- In office 10 May 2011 – 3 October 2017
- Mayor: Peter Soulsby
- Preceded by: Office established
- Succeeded by: Adam Clarke

Member of Leicester City Council for Eyres Monsell
- In office 3 May 2007 – 3 October 2017
- Succeeded by: Elaine Pantling

Personal details
- Born: 19 November 1981 (age 44) Worksop, Nottinghamshire, England
- Party: Labour
- Education: University of York (BA)

Rory Palmer (born 19 November 1981) is a British politician who served as a Member of the European Parliament for the East Midlands from 2017 to 2020. A member of the Labour Party, he was also the Labour candidate in the 2024 Leicestershire Police and Crime Commissioner election.

== Early life and career ==
Palmer attended Hartland School in Worksop, Nottinghamshire. He studied Social Policy at the University of York from 2000 to 2003.

Palmer briefly worked for the Institute for Public Policy Research as a research assistant, before working for nearly five years as a parliamentary assistant to the Labour MPs John Mann and Peter Soulsby. Having first been elected for the Labour Party as a councillor for the Eyres Monsell ward of Leicester City Council in May 2007, he became the city's Deputy Mayor in May 2011 after Soulsby became Mayor of Leicester.

Palmer worked as senior policy, public affairs and campaigns manager at the Guide Dogs for the Blind Association. After leaving the European Parliament, he became network lead for the Trussell Trust East Midlands.

== Political career ==
In the 2010 general election, he unsuccessfully stood as the Labour Party candidate in the Bosworth constituency in Leicestershire. In the 2014 European Parliament election, he was second on the Labour party list in the East Midlands constituency but was not elected. After the Labour MEP Glenis Willmott announced in July 2017 that she would stand down in October of that year, Palmer succeeded her and became an MEP. He remained in this role, being elected in his own right at the 2019 election, until the United Kingdom's withdrawal from the EU on 31 January 2020.

Palmer is a member of the Fabian Society and spent two years on the Executive Committee of the Society from 2019 to 2021. In the 2024 England and Wales police and crime commissioner elections, Palmer was Labour's candidate for Leicestershire, coming second.
