= Gloria Hooper, Baroness Hooper =

Britiah lawyer and politician (born 1939)

The Right Honourable The Baroness Hooper CMG DSG FRSA FRGS
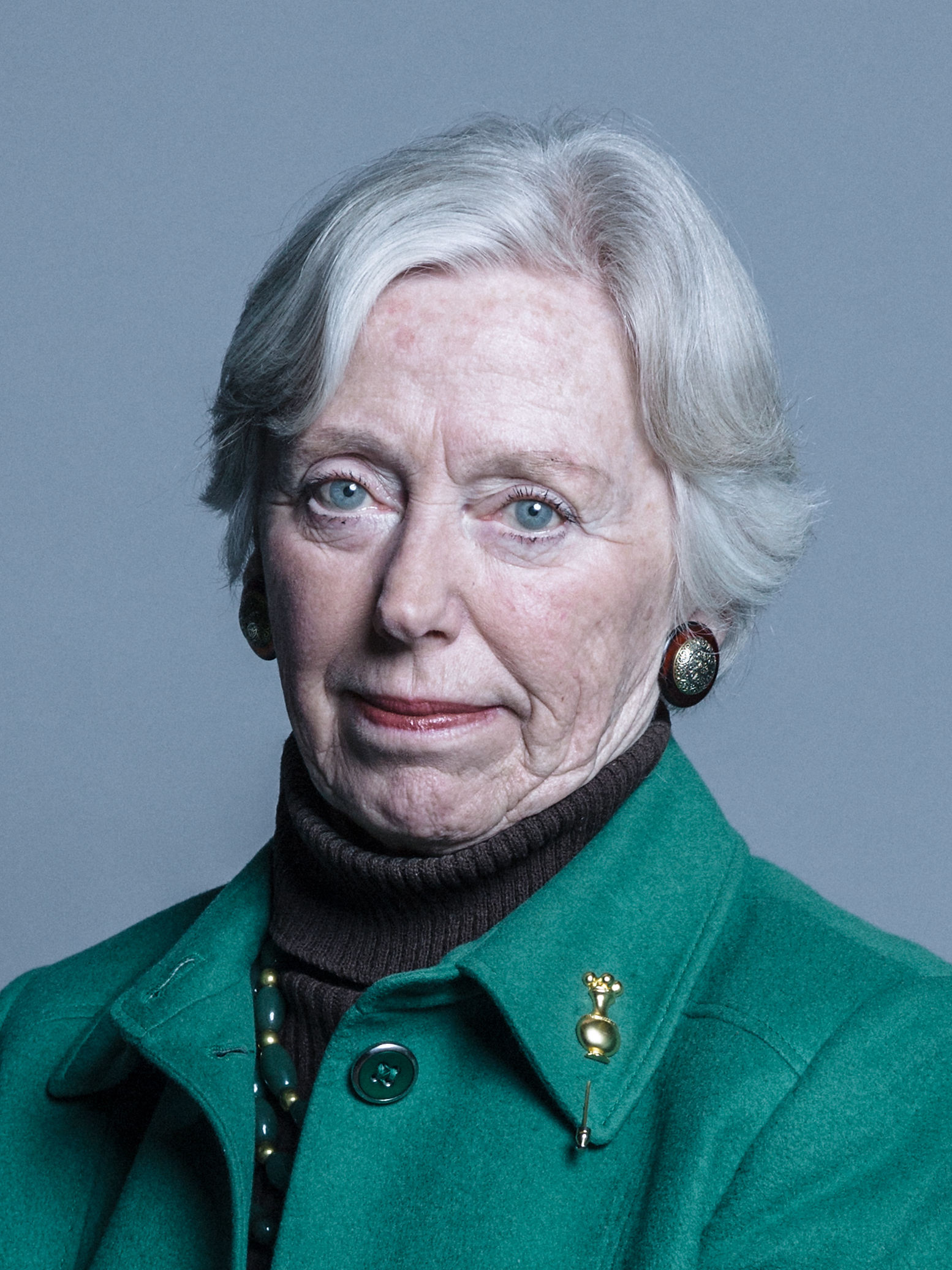

Parliamentary Under-Secretary of State for Health
- In office 28 July 1989 – 14 April 1992
- Prime Minister: Margaret Thatcher; John Major
- Preceded by: new appointment
- Succeeded by: The Baroness Cumberlege

Parliamentary Under-Secretary of State for Energy
- In office 26 July 1988 – 28 July 1989
- Prime Minister: Margaret Thatcher
- Preceded by: new appointment
- Succeeded by: Tony Baldry

Parliamentary Under-Secretary of State for Education and Science
- In office 13 June 1987 – 26 July 1988
- Prime Minister: Margaret Thatcher
- Preceded by: George Walden
- Succeeded by: John Butcher

Member of the House of Lords
- Lord Temporal
- Life peerage 10 June 1985

Member of the European Parliament for Liverpool
- In office 17 July 1979 – 16 July 1984
- Preceded by: Constituency created
- Succeeded by: Kenneth Stewart

Personal details
- Born: 25 May 1939 (age 87)
- Party: Conservative

Gloria Dorothy Hooper, Baroness Hooper, CMG, DSG, FRSA, FRGS (born 25 May 1939) is a British lawyer and a Conservative life peer in the House of Lords.

The daughter of Frederick and Frances (née Maloney) Hooper, she was educated at La Sainte Union Convent High School, Southampton, and at the Royal Ballet School. She attended the University of Southampton, where she received a Bachelor of Arts in law in 1960 and at Universidad Central del Ecuador, where she was a Rotary Foundation Fellow. Baroness Hooper opened The British School of Quito in September 1995.

== Legal background ==
Hooper was assistant to the chief registrar of John Lewis Partnership between 1960 and 1961 and editor in current law of Sweet & Maxwell, Law Publishers between 1961 and 1962. From 1962 to 1967, she was information officer, to the Winchester City Council and from 1967 to 1972, assistant solicitor with Taylor and Humbert. In 1972–73, Hooper was legal adviser to Slater Walker France S.A. Between 1974 and 1984, she was partner with Taylor and Humbert (now Taylor, Wessing).

== Political career ==
An active member of the Conservative Party, Hooper was the party's candidate for Liverpool in the 1979 European Parliament election. Although the seat was thought to be safe Labour, Hooper won it by 7,227 over Labour's Terry Harrison, a member of the Militant group. Comparing the election with the total votes cast in the 1979 general election five weeks previously, the swing to the Conservatives was 11% in Liverpool, as against 5% nationally. Hooper was defeated in the 1984 election in the Merseyside West constituency.

== Affiliations ==
- Anguilla All Party Parliamentary Group, co-chair
- Law Society of England and Wales, member
- Member of the advisory board, Polar Research and Policy Initiative
- President of the British Educational Suppliers Association
- Vice-president of Canning House (Hispanic and Luso Brazilian Council)
- President of Waste Watch
- President of the European Foundation For Heritage Skills
- Institute for the Study of the Americas (University of London), councilmember
- President of Good Guy's Cancer Appeal
- President of the Anglo Latin-American Foundation
- President of the Friends of Colombia for Social Aid
- President of the Central America Business Council (CABC)

== Trusteeships and Fellowships ==
- Trustee, Royal Academy of Dance
- Trustee, Centre for Global Energy Studies
- Trustee, National Museums and Galleries of Merseyside Development Trust
- Trustee/Fellow, Industry and Parliament Trust (and fellow)
- Trustee, The Tablet
- Fellow, Royal Society of Arts
- Fellow, Royal Geographical Society.

== Peerage ==
She was invested as a Companion of the Order of St Michael and St George (CMG) in the 2002 New Year's Honours and on 10 June 1985, she was created a life peer with the title Baroness Hooper, of Liverpool and St James's in the City of Westminster. She was created a Dame of the Order of St Gregory the Great.
