= Kevan Jones =

British politician and life peer (born 1964)

The Right Honourable The Lord Beamish PC
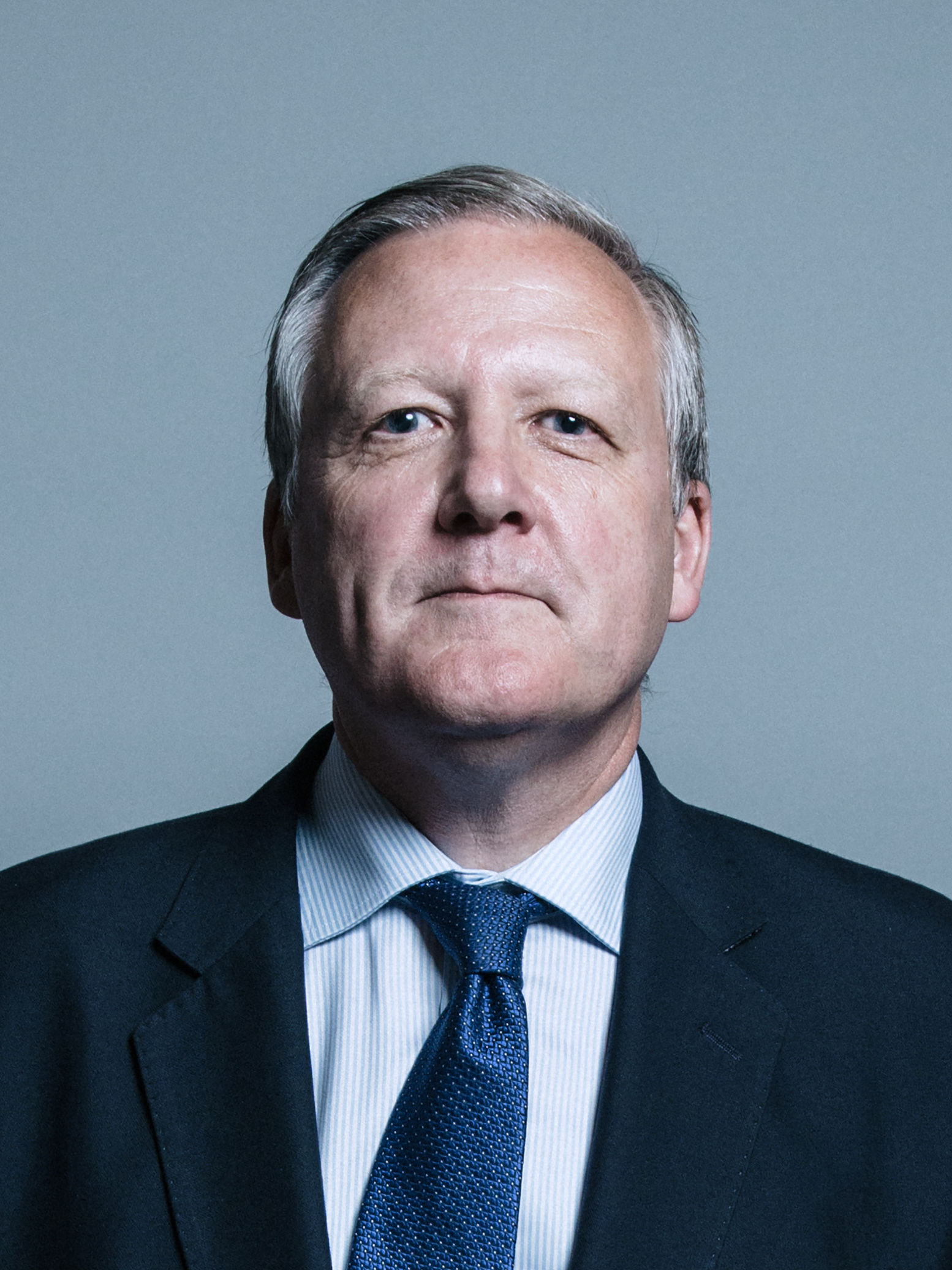
- Official portrait, 2017

Parliamentary Under-Secretary of State for Veterans
- In office 5 October 2008 – 11 May 2010
- Prime Minister: Gordon Brown
- Preceded by: Derek Twigg
- Succeeded by: Andrew Robathan

Member of the House of Lords
- Lord Temporal
- Life peerage 15 August 2024

Member of Parliament for North Durham
- In office 7 June 2001 – 30 May 2024
- Preceded by: Giles Radice
- Succeeded by: Luke Akehurst

Personal details
- Born: Kevan David Jones; 25 April 1964 (age 62) Worksop, Nottinghamshire, England
- Party: Labour
- Education: Newcastle Polytechnic; University of Southern Maine

Kevan David Jones, Baron Beamish (born 25 April 1964), is a British politician who served as the Member of Parliament (MP) for North Durham from 2001 to 2024. A member of the Labour Party, he has been a member of the House of Lords and chair of the Intelligence and Security Committee (ISC) since 2024.

== Early life and career ==
Kevan Jones was born on 25 April 1964 in Nottinghamshire and is the son of a coal miner. He attended Portland Comprehensive School in Worksop and Newcastle Polytechnic, before studying at the University of Southern Maine, gaining a BA (Hons) in Government and Public Policy.

Before becoming an MP, he was a Newcastle upon Tyne councillor from 1990 to 2001 and Chairman of the Development Committee as well as an elected officer of the GMB union.

== Parliamentary career ==
At the 2001 general election, Jones was elected to Parliament as MP for North Durham with 67.2% of the vote and a majority of 18,683.

After becoming an MP, Jones became a member of the influential Defence Select Committee, and also a member of the Labour Party's Parliamentary Committee. His private member's bill, the Christmas Day (Trading) Act 2004, successfully passed Parliament, and came into force in December 2004. The Act makes it illegal for large shops to open on Christmas Day.

Jones was re-elected as MP for North Durham at the 2005 general election with a decreased vote share of 64.1% and a decreased majority of 16,781.

=== Ministerial career ===
Jones was appointed Parliamentary Under Secretary of State and Minister for Veterans at the Ministry of Defence (MoD) in October 2008.

In August 2009 he was accused of briefing against the Chief of the General Staff, General Sir Richard Dannatt, who had been an outspoken critic of the government's record on equipping troops. A series of freedom of information requests had been made concerning Dannatt's expenses, and blogger Guido Fawkes "outed" Jones as the culprit, although he did not provide any evidence that directly connected Jones to the requests. Jones, who had tabled Parliamentary questions on Army officials' spending before becoming a minister, denied the allegations and said he had a good working relationship with Dannatt.

Jones publicly apologised to Joanna Lumley in March 2010 after he had accused her of "deathly silence" over misleading advice being given to some Gurkhas following Lumley's successful campaign to allow more Gurkhas to settle in the UK.

In 2017, Jones said that while in office he had sought to revoke the government's agreement with Annington Homes, by which the MoD agreed to rent back military housing sold to the company under the John Major government in 1996, while allowing the company to sell homes the armed forces no longer required, but found it impossible to do so. Jones described the arrangements as "an incredibly bad deal for the taxpayer".

=== In opposition ===
At the 2010 general election, Jones was again re-elected with a decreased vote share of 50.5% and a decreased majority of 12,076. After the election, Harriet Harman appointed Jones Shadow Minister for the Armed Forces, outside the Shadow Cabinet. He retained this position under Labour leader Ed Miliband and in Jeremy Corbyn's first appointment of shadow ministers in 2015.

Jones became a member of the special Select Committee set up to scrutinise the Bill that became the Armed Forces Act 2011. He was also a member of the public bill committee for the Defence Reform Act 2014.

At the 2015 general election, Jones was again re-elected, with an increased vote share of 54.9% and an increased majority of 13,644.

In December 2015 Jones made public his strong criticism of the new Labour leader Jeremy Corbyn, in particular after Corbyn opposed military intervention in the Syrian civil war. Jones stated "because of [Corbyn's] incompetence, the Tories are getting away with things that are not being properly scrutinised and the people who are suffering are the ones that we represent".

In January 2016, Jones resigned as a Shadow Minister for the Armed Forces, following a reshuffle in which Jeremy Corbyn had promoted Emily Thornberry, who opposes the replacement of the Trident nuclear weapon system, to shadow Defence Secretary. In his resignation letter, Jones said he believed that the country had to "maintain a credible nuclear deterrent, while working to advance global nuclear disarmament".

Jones later supported Owen Smith in the failed attempt to replace Jeremy Corbyn in the 2016 Labour leadership election.

Jones supported the Saudi Arabian-led intervention in Yemen.

He is Treasurer of the All-Party Parliamentary Group on Industrial Heritage.

At the snap 2017 general election, Jones was again re-elected, with an increased vote share of 59.9% and a decreased majority of 12,939.

He is a member of Labour Friends of Israel.

Jones was again re-elected at the 2019 general election, with a decreased vote share of 44.2% and a decreased majority of 4,742.

In February 2024, Jones was criticised for being "rude" and "disrespectful" during a debate in the House of Commons chamber after describing the Deputy Speaker Dame Eleanor Laing as "irritating", resulting in a reprimand from Laing who was in the Speaker's Chair.

In May 2024, Jones announced that he would not stand again in the 2024 general election due to health issues.

=== Peerage ===
After standing down as an MP, Jones was nominated for a life peerage in the 2024 Dissolution Honours. He was created Baron Beamish, of Beamish in the County of Durham, on 15 August 2024. Instead of following the usual convention of using his surname in his title, he chose the name of Beamish, a village in his former constituency, as well as to pay tribute to Lord Lawson of Beamish, whom he described as one of his political heroes.

Jones is a campaigner for workers mistreated by the Post Office.

== Mental health ==
In 2012, in a debate in Parliament on mental health issues and their "taboo", Jones spoke about his experience of having depression, alongside Conservative Charles Walker, who spoke about his own 30-year experience of obsessive–compulsive disorder. Jones stated that he had had depression since 1996. Jones and Walker were both later praised for their speeches by Time to Change, a mental health anti-stigma campaign run by charities Mind and Rethink Mental Illness.

In a 2015 public disagreement with Ken Livingstone regarding the Trident nuclear missile system, Livingstone told the Daily Mirror that Jones was "obviously depressed and disturbed" and "should see a GP". Jones responded that the remarks "belong in the dark ages" and that mental health should not be used to attack political differences. Livingstone eventually apologised unreservedly.

== Notes ==
Parliament of the United Kingdom
Preceded by Giles Radice	Member of Parliament for North Durham; 2001–2024	Succeeded by Luke Akehurst
Orders of precedence in the United Kingdom
Preceded by The Lord Spellar	Gentlemen; Baron Beamish	Followed by The Lord Cryer
