= Gary Titley =

British politician (born 1950)

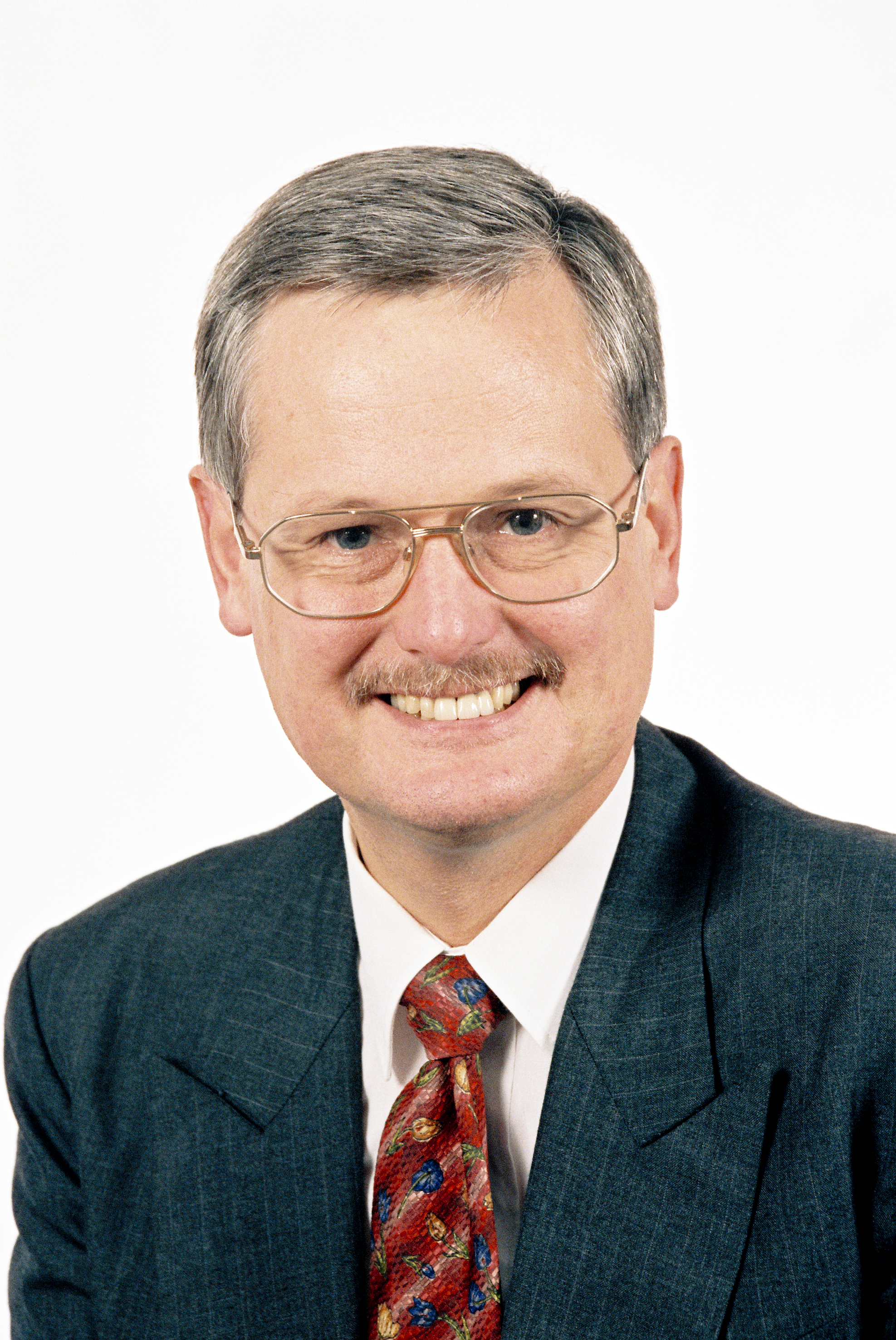

Member of the European Parliament for North West England Greater Manchester West (1989–1999)
- In office 25 July 1989 – 13 July 2009
- Preceded by: Barbara Castle
- Succeeded by: Seat abolished

Personal details
- Born: 19 January 1950 (age 76) Salford, Lancashire, England, United Kingdom
- Party: Labour
- Other political affiliations: Socialist Group

Gary Titley (born 19 January 1950) is a British Labour Party politician and a former Member of the European Parliament (MEP) for the North West of England.

Born in Salford, Titley was educated at the University of York. He worked as a teacher, then as campaign manager for Terry Pitt, and later for John Bird. He served on West Midlands County Council from 1981 to 1986, and unsuccessfully contested Bromsgrove at the 1983 general election, and Dudley West at the 1987 general election.

He is a former director of the West Midlands Enterprise Board and chaired the West Midlands Co-op Finance Company and the Black Country Co-op Development Agency. He was previously a member of the Labour Party's Plant Committee on electoral reform.

He was first elected an MEP in June 1989. From 1991 to 1993, he was the chair of the Joint Parliamentary Committee with Finland, from 1991 to 1994 he was the Parliament's rapporteur of Finland's accession to the EU, from 1993 to 1994 he was the founding president of the European Economic Area Joint Parliamentary Assembly, from 1996 to 1999 he was the foreign affairs spokesman for the Socialist Group, from 1997 to 2001 he was European Parliamentary private secretary to Rt Hon Robin Cook MP, the foreign secretary, from 1999 to 2002 he was chair of the Joint Parliamentary Committee with Lithuania, and from 2002 to 2004 he was vice president of the Socialist Group with Responsibility for Enlargement. He then served as leader of the European Parliamentary Labour Party (EPLP) from 2002 until January 2009.

In January 2004 a letter bomb was sent to his office and opened by his wife, a member of his staff. It immediately started to smoke and then caught fire, but no one was injured.

As a result of his activities in the European Parliament he has been made a Commander of the White Rose of Finland, and the Order of the Lithuanian Grand Duke Gediminas.

He announced in 2009 that he would not stand for re-election in the 2009 European Parliament election.

Party political offices
Preceded by Simon Murphy	Leader of the European Parliamentary Labour Party; 2002–2009	Succeeded by Glenis Willmott
