= Liverpool (European Parliament constituency) =

Former European Parliament constituency

- European Parliament constituency
- Boundary within North West England (1979-1984)
- Member state: United Kingdom
- Created: 1979
- Dissolved: 1984
- MEPs: 1

Prior to its uniform adoption of proportional representation in 1999, the United Kingdom used first-past-the-post for the European elections in England, Scotland and Wales. The European Parliament constituencies used under that system were smaller than the later regional constituencies and only had one Member of the European Parliament each.

The constituency of Liverpool was one of them.

When it was created in England in 1979, it consisted of the Westminster Parliament constituencies of Bootle, Liverpool Edge Hill, Liverpool Garston, Liverpool Kirkdale, Liverpool Scotland Exchange, Liverpool Toxteth, Liverpool Walton, Liverpool Wavertree, Liverpool West Derby.

== Member of the European Parliament ==
Elected	Name	Party
1979	Gloria Hooper	Conservative
1984	Constituency abolished	

== Results ==
European Parliament election, 1979: Liverpool
Party	Candidate	Votes	%	±%
Conservative	Gloria Hooper	49,646	45.2	
Labour	Terry Harrison	42,419	38.7	
Liberal	Paul R. Clark	17,650	16.1	
Majority		7,227	6.5	
Turnout		109,715	23.7	
Conservative win (new seat)				
