= Tutor group =

A tutor group is a term used in schools in the United Kingdom to denote a group of students whose pastoral and academic needs are looked after by one tutor. This will happen either through regular tutorials, or on a more casual basis. A group of students under one tutor are called tutees. Other terms, which are sometimes used synonymously, include form group and class.

In secondary schools, tutor groups are usually the group with which a student is registered at the beginning or end of each school session, often before the first lesson and after lunch. If students are taught in a number of different sets for different subjects throughout the day, then a tutor group may comprise students with whom they do not have lessons. However, such groupings may be used for the teaching of some subjects in school.

The term is broadly equivalent to the term homeroom used in the United States.

== Types of tutoring ==
=== Horizontal tutoring ===
The traditional way of organising a secondary school in the UK relies on same-age grouping usually referred to as a year-system. In the USA this is called a grade system. Tutor group sizes may vary, but are typically between 25 and 30 students all from the same year group. In some schools, a group of students is assigned a tutor who will remain with that group for several years, possibly throughout their time at that school. Tutor groups are sometimes given names, though more often they are assigned a code such as 6A, where the number indicates the National Curriculum year group. Tutor time, a short session that tutors and tutees spend together, is usually at the start of the day and lasts about 20 minutes. Schools see this as a settling in time and an opportunity to get basic school administration done, such as registration.

=== Vertical tutoring ===
An alternative tutorial arrangement is vertical tutoring (VT), which has been adopted by many schools in the UK and internationally since 2000. Such schools populate tutor groups with students from all age groups changing the way the school organises communications, assessments, and networks of learning. Research by Peter A. Barnard tracks the development of a number of principles and practices emanating from this tranche of schools. These include:

- Using all available classrooms to reduce group sizes to an optimal number of 18 students
- Ensuring that groups are as balanced as possible by gender, ability, behaviour (not friendship)
- Ensuring that all staff including support, admin, and leadership team are tutors, i.e. there are two tutors per group
- Moving tutor time to the 20 minutes before morning break
- Ensuring that all communications are re-routed through tutors who act as information hubs between the school, students, and parents
- Revamping the assessment and reporting system to support deep learning conversations between the school, the student, and home
- Moving the school from year-based organisation to a house system (a nested or ecological system), restructuring the management system

In independent schools, tutoring usually operates within the house system. This means that tutors will be attached to a house and all their tutees will be in the same house. Tutors will work with housemasters to encourage pupils' development.

== See also ==
- House system
