= European Parliamentary Labour Party =

Former European parliamentary party

The European Parliamentary Labour Party (EPLP) was the parliamentary party of the British Labour Party in the European Parliament. The EPLP was part of the pan-European Group of Socialists and Democrats (S&D), (with MEPs from sister parties such as the French Socialist Party, the German SPD, the Swedish Social Democrats and Dutch Labour Party), and which is the parliamentary wing of the Party of European Socialists (PES), to which Labour was (and remains) affiliated.

Like other national delegations, the EPLP had its own leadership and spokespeople representing Labour in Brussels and Strasbourg (and the EPLP in the UK).

Several Labour MEPs went on to careers in Westminster, including John Prescott as Deputy Prime Minister, Geoff Hoon as Minister for Europe and subsequently Defence Secretary, Ann Clwyd as Chair of the Parliamentary Labour Party, Joyce Quin and Glenys Kinnock, both as Ministers for Europe, and Richard Caborn as Minister for Sport.

The EPLP ceased to exist after the UK left the European Union in January 2020. At the time of dissolution, Labour had 10 Members of the European Parliament.

== Leader ==
The leader of the EPLP had a seat on the Labour Party National Executive Committee and attended shadow cabinet meetings.

=== List of Leaders of the European Parliamentary Labour Party ===
Name	Years as Leader
Michael Stewart	1975–1976
John Prescott	1976–1979
Barbara Castle	1979–1985
Alf Lomas	1985–1987
David Martin	1987–1988
Barry Seal	1988–1989
Glyn Ford	1989–1993
Pauline Green	1993–1994
Wayne David	1994–1998
Alan Donnelly	1998–1999
Simon Murphy	1999–2002
Gary Titley	2002–2009
Glenis Willmott	2009–2017
Richard Corbett	2017–2020

== Positions in the European Parliament and related bodies ==
Labour figures held, over the years of UK membership, a number of key positions in the EU, including many held by Labour MEPs in the European Parliament. These included:

- 1 leader of the S&D Group Pauline Green
- 4 Vice-presidents of the Parliament, including the longest serving one ever, David Martin
- 12 Chairs of Parliamentary committees, including the longest serving Ken Collins
- The European Parliament's rapporteurs on the Maastricht Treaty, the Amsterdam Treaty, the Constitutional Treaty and the Lisbon Treaty David Martin and Richard Corbett
- The draftsman of the revised Rules of Procedure of the European Parliament Richard Corbett
- 2 Secretaries General of the Group Julian Priestley and David Harley
- 1 Secretary General of the Parliament Julian Priestley
- 1 President of the PES Robin Cook
- 1 President of the Commission Roy Jenkins
- 1 EU High Representative for Foreign Affairs Cathy Ashton

EPLP members were frequently elected as the S&D Group's Committee Co-ordinators, acting as spokespeople for the Group in their respective parliamentary committees and on the subjects they covered.
