= Real progress =

Green Party of England and Wales tagline

Real Progress was a strapline, brand and theme of the Green Party of England and Wales in the 2004 European Parliament election and the 2005 UK general election. It was the subject of a Guardian editorial simply entitled "Real progress".

== Origins ==
The slogan was conceived by the Publications Co-ordinator on the Green Party Executive, 25-year-old Matt Wootton in late Summer 2003. It was first used in a leaflet at the Green Party's Autumn Conference in Lancaster in 2003. The Real Progress phrase was based on a theme initiated by External Communications Co-ordinator 2000–2004 Dr Spencer Fitz-Gibbon. By the end of the year Wootton had employed graphic designer Jim Killock to unify the words Green Party and Real Progress in a single "badge" and the "lozenge" was born, inspired as a homage to the European Green Party's "rhomb" which Wootton and Killock considered clunky (see Wootton's homepage).

== Stylistic changes ==
The Real Progress rebrand was also a house style change, using a new set of colours, according to Wootton's website, inspired by the colours used on the website of the Swedish Green Party.

The rebrand utilised a designer typeface - the first time the Green Party had used one - which was chosen to be the modern-looking FF Profile which was chosen for its progressive, clean and slightly quirky qualities.

== Impact and significance ==
The rebrand was first launched to the media at the Spring Conference 2004 and made was covered by the BBC and The Times. The Times article demonstrates the importance of the rebrand to the Green Party at that time, with the party apparently eschewing "beards, sandals and nut cutlets" for "sharp suits, a new colour scheme, a corporate logo and an “upbeat” range of “commonsense” policies."

Although not an essentially research-based rebrand created using qualitative feedback, Wootton and Killock (Killock joined the Executive the next year) went on to become the party's two leading advocates of research and demographics.

A series of Guardian articles are below, demonstrating the impact of the rebranding.
