= Paul Brannen =

British politician

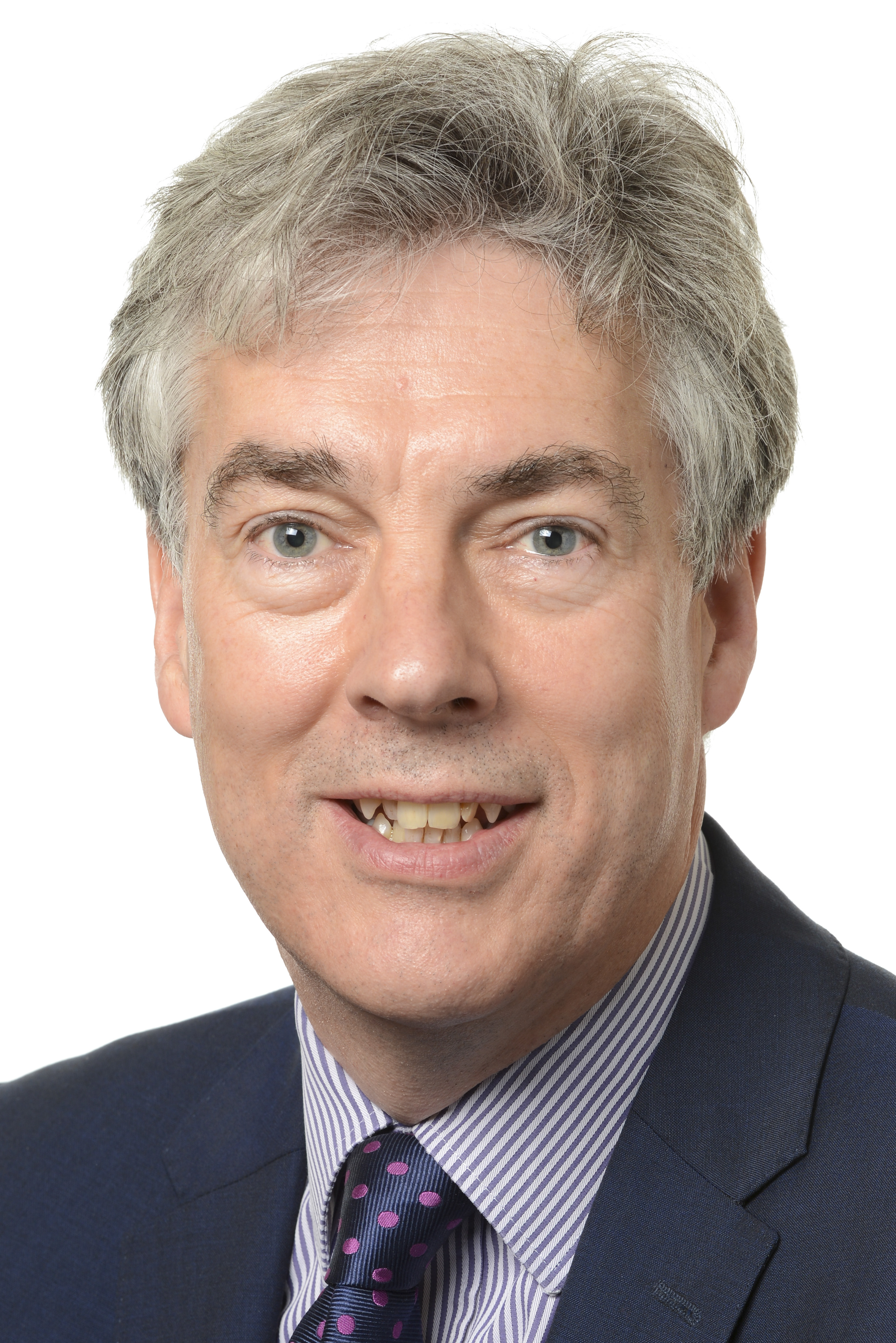

Member of the European Parliament for North East England
- In office 1 July 2014 – 1 July 2019
- Preceded by: Fiona Hall
- Succeeded by: John Tennant

Personal details
- Born: 13 September 1962 (age 63) Peterborough, United Kingdom
- Party: Labour
- Education: University of Leeds

Paul Brannen (born 13 September 1962) is a British Labour Party politician. He is a former Member of the European Parliament (MEP) for the North East England region: he was elected in 2014 and lost his seat in 2019.

== Early life ==
Brannen was brought up in Tyneside, North East England. He attended the University of Leeds, where he studied theology and religious studies. Being involved in student politics, he became President of the Leeds University Union. Brannen also holds an MBA from Durham University Business School.

== Early career ==
After university, Brannen worked as a campaigns officer for the Anti-Apartheid Movement, leading the campaign against executions by the apartheid government in South Africa. He famously interrupted a press conference being held by Mike Gatting to announce his plans to lead a rebel cricket tour to South Africa in breach of the international sporting boycott. He was a press officer for the Labour Party from 1991 to 1992. He then moved to Christian Aid, where he was head of campaigns from 1992 to 1997. He led campaigns on poverty and, more recently, climate change.

== Political career and activism ==
Brannen served five years as a Councillor on Newcastle City Council. He has twice stood for election as a Member of Parliament; for Berwick-upon-Tweed in 1997, and for Hexham in 2001. He was unsuccessful at both elections having come second.

=== European Parliament ===
Brannen stood in the 2014 European Parliament election as a Labour Party candidate for the North East England region. With Labour having won the most votes in the region, he was elected a Member of the European Parliament. On 1 July 2014, he was elected to the Committee on Agriculture and Rural Development.

He supported Owen Smith in the 2016 Labour Party (UK) leadership election.
