= Judith Kirton-Darling =

British politician

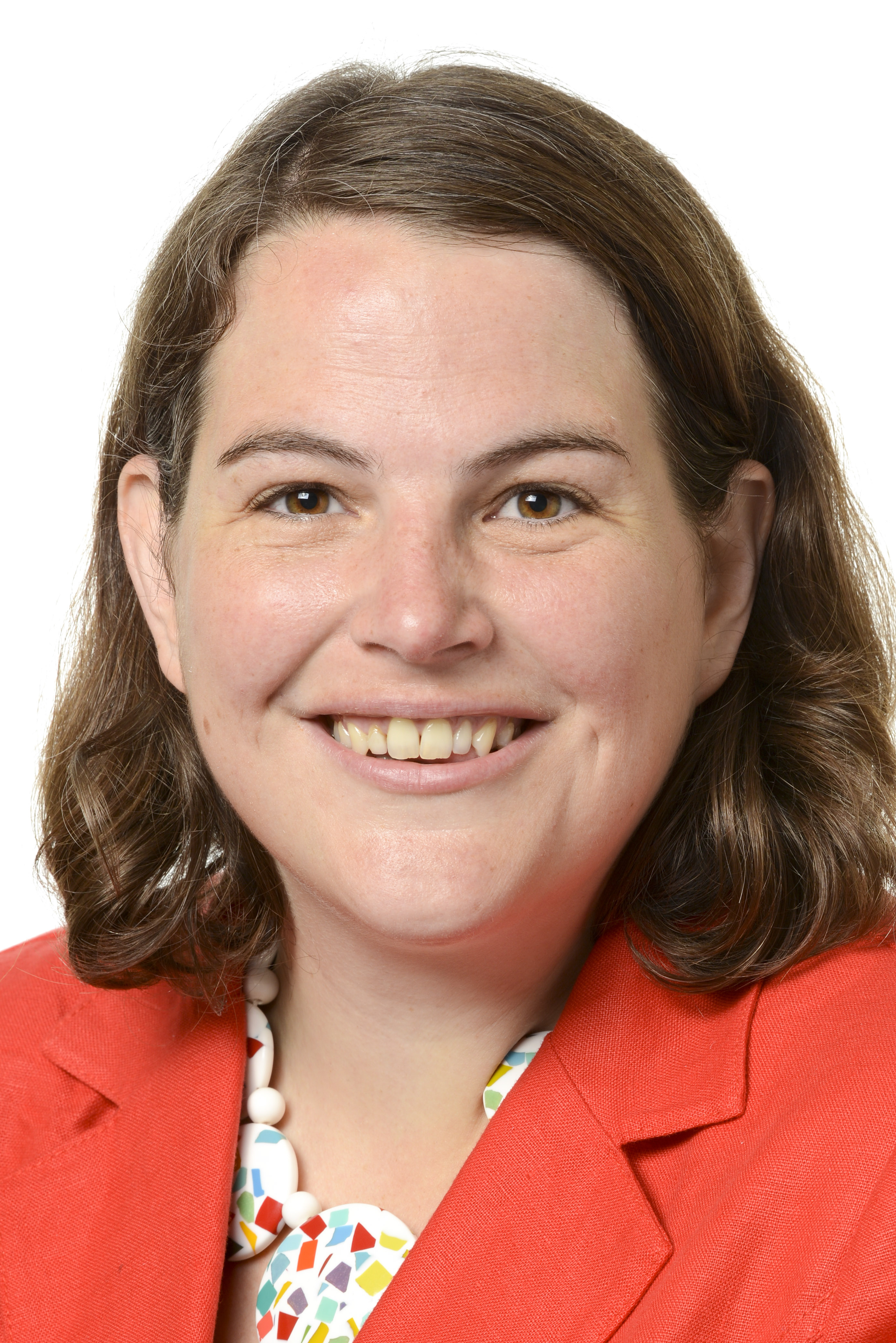

Member of the European Parliament for North East England
- In office 1 July 2014 – 31 January 2020
- Preceded by: Stephen Hughes
- Succeeded by: constituency abolished

Personal details
- Born: 2 June 1977 (age 49) Dar-Es-Salaam, Tanzania
- Party: Labour

Judith "Jude" Kirton-Darling (born 2 June 1977) is a British politician who served as Member of the European Parliament for the North East England region for the Labour Party between 2014 and the United Kingdom's withdrawal from the EU.

== Early life ==
Kirton-Darling was born on 2 June 1977 in Dar es Salaam, Tanzania. She was educated in Middlesbrough, England, at Hall Garth Secondary School and Acklam Sixth Form College. In 1996, she matriculated into the University of Sheffield where she studied history and politics. In 1999, she graduated with an upper second class Bachelor of Arts (BA) degree. From 2000 to 2001, she studied at the University of Bath (with study abroad at the University of Pavia) and completed a Master of Science (MSc) degree in European Social Policy Analysis.

== Political career ==
Kirton-Darling began her political career as a programme assistant with the Quaker Council for European Affairs from 1999 to 2000. On 18 May 2011, she was elected Confederal Secretary of the European Trade Union Confederation.

=== European Parliament ===
Kirton-Darling stood in the 2014 European Parliament election as a Labour Party candidate for the North East England region. With Labour having won the most votes in the region, she was elected a Member of the European Parliament. On 1 July 2014, she was elected to the Committee for International Trade and the Committee on Petitions.

She was re-elected as MEP in the 2019 European elections and then elected as whip of the Labour party MEPs. However, with the passing of the Brexit accords, her membership ended on 30 January 2020.

Winner of the International Trade Award, MEP Awards 2017.

== Personal life ==
Kirton-Darling is a practising Quaker.
