= Sacred Heart Catholic High School, Newcastle upon Tyne =

Sacred Heart High School

Location
- Fenham Hall Drive; Newcastle upon Tyne, Tyne and Wear, NE4 9YH; England; 54.983°N 1.657°W

Information
- Type: Academy
- Religious affiliation: Roman Catholic
- Established: 1905
- Founder: Society of the Sacred Heart
- Local authority: Newcastle upon Tyne
- Specialists: Technology and Arts
- Department for Education URN: 137708 Tables
- Ofsted: Reports
- Headteacher: Suzanne Howell
- Staff: 350
- Gender: Girls
- Age: 11 to 18
- Enrolment: 1,000 +
- Diocese: Hexham and Newcastle
- Website: http://www.sacredheart-high.org/

Sacred Heart High School is a secondary school with academy status for girls. It is located on Fenham Hall Drive in Newcastle upon Tyne, England.

== General Information ==
The school educates around 1,400 girls between the ages of eleven and eighteen on the site which has had a near £10 million makeover. The school consists of the main building, a technology and art building, a P.E. block, a maths and modern foreign languages building, a geography building, the sixth form centre, a small pottery and a dance studio. The uniform is currently (2015) a navy blue blazer and jumper, and a Douglas Tartan kilt or trousers(dark blue, light blue, green and white).

== History ==
A private college was founded in Fenham Hall in 1903 becoming a Government-recognised boarding and day school in 1905, taking ex-pupil-teachers, scholarship and fee-paying pupils. The college initially opened with 60 pupils and was under the sponsorship of the Society of the Sacred Heart nuns. It went through a number of changes until 1926 when it obtained Direct Grant status and became a grammar school.

The grammar school lasted until 1977 when it became the Sacred Heart Comprehensive School, taking girls from 11 – 18 years old. In 1998 it was renamed the Sacred Heart Roman Catholic High School.

In 2007 the school signed up to the Building Schools for the Future initiative.

== Alumni ==
- Donna Air, actress and television presenter
- Emma Foody, Labour and Co-operative Party politician who has served as MP for Cramlington and Killingworth since 2024.
- Aimee Kelly, actress
- Catherine McKinnell (née Grady), Labour MP since 2010 for Newcastle upon Tyne North

=== Sacred Heart Grammar School ===
- Mary Glindon (née Mulgrove), Labour MP since 2010 for North Tyneside
- Frances Lannon, academic, principal from 2002 to 2015 of Lady Margaret Hall, Oxford
- Val McLane, actress, scriptwriter, director and teacher
- Mo O'Toole, politician, Labour MEP for North East England from 1999 to 2004

=== Former teachers ===
- Sister Bernadette Porter CBE (taught 1975–78), Vice-Chancellor from 1999 to 2004 of Roehampton University
