= Tyne and Wear (European Parliament constituency) =

Former European Parliament constituency

- European Parliament constituency
- Boundary within North East England (1984-1994)
- Member state: United Kingdom
- Created: 1984
- Dissolved: 1999
- MEPs: 1

Prior to its uniform adoption of proportional representation in 1999, the United Kingdom used first-past-the-post for the European elections in England, Scotland and Wales. The European Parliament constituencies used under that system were smaller than the later regional constituencies and only had one Member of the European Parliament each.

The constituency of Tyne and Wear was one of them.

It consisted of the Westminster Parliament constituencies (on their 1983 boundaries) of Gateshead East, Houghton and Washington, Jarrow, Newcastle-upon-Tyne East, South Shields, Sunderland North, Sunderland South, and Tyne Bridge.

Boundary within North East England (1994-1999)

== MEPs ==
| Elected | Member | Party |
|---|---|---|
| 1984 | Joyce Quin | Labour |
| 1989 | Alan Donnelly | Labour |
| 1999 | Constituency abolished: see North East England | |

== Election results ==
European Parliament election, 1984: Tyne and Wear
| Party | Candidate | Votes | % | ±% |
|---|---|---|---|---|
| Labour | Joyce Quin | 89,024 | 60.3 | |
| Conservative | Roger R Cook | 39,610 | 26.8 | |
| Liberal | Brendan P Carroll | 19,081 | 12.9 | |
| Majority | | 49,414 | 33.5 | |
| Turnout | | 147,715 | | |
| Labour win (new seat) | | | | |

European Parliament election, 1989: Tyne and Wear
| Party | Candidate | Votes | % | ±% |
|---|---|---|---|---|
| Labour | Alan Donnelly | 126,682 | 69.3 | +9.0 |
| Conservative | Nicholas C Gibbon | 30,902 | 16.9 | −9.9 |
| Green | Ralph Stather | 18,107 | 9.9 | New |
| SLD | Peter J Arnold | 6,101 | 3.4 | −9.5 |
| Socialist (GB) | TP Kilgallon | 919 | 0.5 | New |
| Majority | | 95,780 | 52.4 | +18.9 |
| Turnout | | 182,711 | | |
| Labour hold | | Swing | | |

European Parliament election, 1994: Tyne and Wear
| Party | Candidate | Votes | % | ±% |
|---|---|---|---|---|
| Labour | Alan Donnelly | 107,604 | 74.4 | +5.1 |
| Conservative | Ian Liddell-Grainger | 19,224 | 13.3 | −3.6 |
| Liberal Democrats | Peter J Maughan | 8,706 | 6.0 | +2.6 |
| Green | Gareth LN Edwards | 4,375 | 3.0 | −6.9 |
| Independent | Winifred E Lundgren | 4,174 | 2.9 | New |
| Independent | Alexander W Fisken | 650 | 0.4 | New |
| Majority | | 88,380 | 61.1 | +8.7 |
| Turnout | | 144,733 | | |
| Labour hold | | Swing | | |
