= North East England (European Parliament constituency) =

Former European Parliament constituency

- European Parliament constituency
- Location among the 2014 constituencies

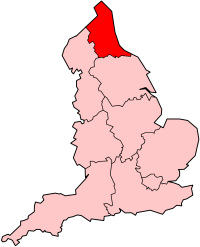
- Shown within England
- Member state: United Kingdom
- Created: 1999
- Dissolved: 31 January 2020
- MEPs: 4 (1999–2004); 3 (2004–2020)

North East England was a constituency of the European Parliament. It elected 3 MEPs using the D'Hondt method of party-list proportional representation, until the UK exit from the European Union on 31 January 2020.

== Boundaries ==
The constituency corresponded to the North East England region of the United Kingdom, comprising the ceremonial counties of Northumberland, Tyne and Wear, County Durham and parts of North Yorkshire.

== History ==
The constituency was formed as a result of the European Parliamentary Elections Act 1999, replacing a number of single-member constituencies. These were Durham, Northumbria, Tyne and Wear, and parts of Cleveland and Richmond.

MEPs for former North East England constituencies, 1979 – 1999
Election	1979 – 1984	1984 – 1989	1989 – 1994	1994 – 1999
Cleveland (1979 – 1984); Cleveland and Yorkshire North (1984 – 1994); Cleveland and Richmond (1994 – 1999)	Peter Vanneck; Conservative		David Bowe; Labour	
Durham	Roland Boyes; Labour	Stephen Hughes; Labour		
Northumbria	Gordon Adam; Labour			
Tyne South and Wear (1979 – 1984); Tyne and Wear (1984 – 1999)	Joyce Quin; Labour		Alan Donnelly; Labour	

== Returned members ==
MEPs for North East England, 1999 onwards
Election	1999 (5th parliament)		2004 (6th parliament)	2009 (7th parliament)	2014 (8th parliament)	2019 (9th parliament)
MEP Party	Martin Callanan; Conservative				Jonathan Arnott; UKIP (2014–18); Independent (2018 - 2019); Brexit Party (2019)	Brian Monteith; Brexit Party
MEP Party	Alan Donnelly; Labour until December 1999	Gordon Adam; Labour from December 1999	Fiona Hall; Liberal Democrat		Paul Brannen; Labour	John Tennant; Brexit Party
MEP Party	Stephen Hughes; Labour				Judith Kirton-Darling; Labour	
MEP Party	Mo O'Toole; Labour		Seat abolished			

Key to political groups of the European Parliament (UK)
Party			Faction in European Parliament	
Brexit Party	29		Non-Inscrits	57
DUP	1		Non-Inscrits	57
Liberal Democrats	16	17	Renew Europe	108
Alliance	1	17	Renew Europe	108
Green	7	11	Greens–European Free Alliance	75
SNP	3	11	Greens–European Free Alliance	75
Plaid Cymru	1	11	Greens–European Free Alliance	75
Labour	10		Socialists and Democrats	154
Conservative	4		European Conservatives and Reformists Group	62
Sinn Féin	1		European United Left–Nordic Green Left	41
Total	73		Total	750

== Election results ==
Elected candidates are shown in bold. Brackets indicate the number of votes per seat won and the order in which candidates won their seats.

=== 2019 ===
2019 results

European Election 2019: North East England
List	Candidates	Votes	Of total (%)	± from prev.
Brexit Party	**Brian Monteith** (1) **John Tennant** (2) Richard Monaghan	240,056 (120,028)	38.73	+38.73
Labour	**Jude Kirton-Darling** (3) Paul Brannen, Clare Penny-Evans	119,931	19.35	−17.12
Liberal Democrats	Fiona Hall, Julie Pörksen, Aidan King	104,330	16.83	+10.90
Green	Rachel Featherstone, Jonathan Elmer, Dawn Furness	49,905	8.05	+2.86
Conservative	Richard Lawrie, Chris Galley, Duncan Crute	42,395	6.84	−10.86
UKIP	Richard Elvin, Christopher Gallacher, Alan Breeze	38,269	6.17	−23.02
Change UK	Frances Weetman, Penny Hawley, Kathryn Heywood	24,968	4.03	+4.03
Turnout		619,854	32.7	+1.8

=== 2014 ===
2014 results

European Election 2014: North East England
List	Candidates	Votes	Of total (%)	± from prev.
Labour	**Judith Kirton-Darling** (1) **Paul Brannen** (3) Jayne Shotton	221,988 (110,994)	36.5	+11.5
UKIP	**Jonathan Arnott** (2) Richard Elvin, Phillip Broughton	177,660	29.2	+13.8
Conservative	Martin Callanan, Ben Houchen, Andrew Lee	107,733	17.7	−2.1
Liberal Democrats	Angelika Schneider, Owen Temple, Christian Vassie	36,093	5.9	−11.7
Green	Shirley Ford, Alison Whalley, Caroline Robinson	31,605	5.2	−0.6
An Independence from Europe	Sherri Forbes, Nawal Hizan, Mary Forbes	13,934	2.3	New
BNP	Martin Vaughan, Lady Dorothy Brooks, Peter Foreman	10,360	1.7	−7.2
English Democrat	Kevin Riddiough, Sam Kelly, John Lewis	9,279	1.5	−0.7
Turnout		608,652	30.9	+0.5

=== 2009 ===
2009 results

European Election 2009: North East England
List	Candidates	Votes	Of total (%)	± from prev.
Labour	**Stephen Hughes** (1) Fay Tinnon, Nick Wallis	147,338	25.0	−9.1
Conservative	**Martin Callanan** (2) Barbara Musgrave, Richard Bell	116,911	19.8	+1.2
Liberal Democrats	**Fiona Hall** (3) Chris Foote-Wood, Neil Bradbury	103,644	17.6	−0.2
UKIP	Gordon Parkin, Sandra Allison, John Tennant	90,700	15.4	+3.2
BNP	Adam Walker, Peter Mailer, Ken Booth	52,700	8.9	+2.5
Green	Shirley Ford, Iris Ryder, Nic Best	34,081	5.8	+1.0
English Democrat	Frank Roseman, Allan White, Graham Robinson	13,007	2.2	New
Socialist Labour	Michael York, John Taylor, James Dodsworth	10,238	1.7	New
NO2EU	Martin Levy, Hannah Walter, Peter Pinkney	8,066	1.4	New
Christian	Don Botham, Daniel Parker, Coral Thompson	7,263	1.2	New
Libertas	Ken Rollings, Alasdair Macleod, William Tremlett	3,010	0.5	New
Jury Team (UK)	Ahmed Khan, Jackie Riley	2,904	0.5	New
Turnout		589,862	30.4	−10.4

=== 2004 ===
2004 results

European Election 2004: North East England
List	Candidates	Votes	Of total (%)	± from prev.
Labour	**Stephen Hughes** (1) Mo O'Toole, Joanne Thompson	266,057	34.1	−8.1
Conservative	**Martin Callanan** (2) Jeremy Middleton, Amanda Vigar	144,969	18.6	−8.8
Liberal Democrats	**Fiona Hall** (3) Chris Wood, Gregory Stone	138,791	17.8	+4.3
UKIP	Piers Merchant, Charlotte Bull, Val Cowell	94,887	12.2	+3.4
BNP	Alan Patterson, Andrew Harris, Jenny Agnew	50,249	6.4	+5.5
Independent	Neil Herron	39,658	5.1	New
Green	Pam Woolner, Nic Best, Judith Brennan	37,247	4.8	+0.1
Respect	Yvonne Ridley, Yunus Bakhsh, David Stewart	8,633	1.1	New
Turnout		780,491	40.8	+21.3

=== 1999 ===
1999 results

European Election 1999: North East England
List	Candidates	Votes	Of total (%)	± from prev.
Labour	**Alan Donnelly** (1) **Stephen Hughes** (3) **Mo O'Toole** (4) Gordon Adam	162,573 (54,191)	42.2	
Conservative	**Martin Callanan** (2) Aidan Ruff, Brendan Murphy, Neil Macgregor	105,573	27.4	
Liberal Democrats	Chris Foote Wood, Fiona Hall, Peter Maughan, Jane Harvey	52,070	13.5	
UKIP	Rodney Atkinson, William Brown, Martin Rouse, Graeme Oswald	34,063	8.8	
Green	Nicolas Best, Ruth Whiteside, Bridget Speight, Michael Greveson	18,184	4.7	
Socialist Labour	Brian Gibson, Gordon Potts, James Fitzpatrick, Kenneth Hall	4,511	1.2	
BNP	Alan Gould, John Bowles, Iain Wilson, Colin Smith	3,505	0.9	
Pro-Euro Conservative	Dominic Tilley, Marie Adams, Desmond Harney, John Meredith	2,926	0.8	
Socialist (GB)	John Bisset, Steven Colborn, Stephen Davison, Andrew Pitts	1,510	0.4	
Natural Law	Paul Kember, Richard Buswell, Richard Keyton, Christopher Adamson	826	0.2	
Turnout		385,741	19.5	
