= Mo O'Toole =

British Labour Party politician (born 1960)

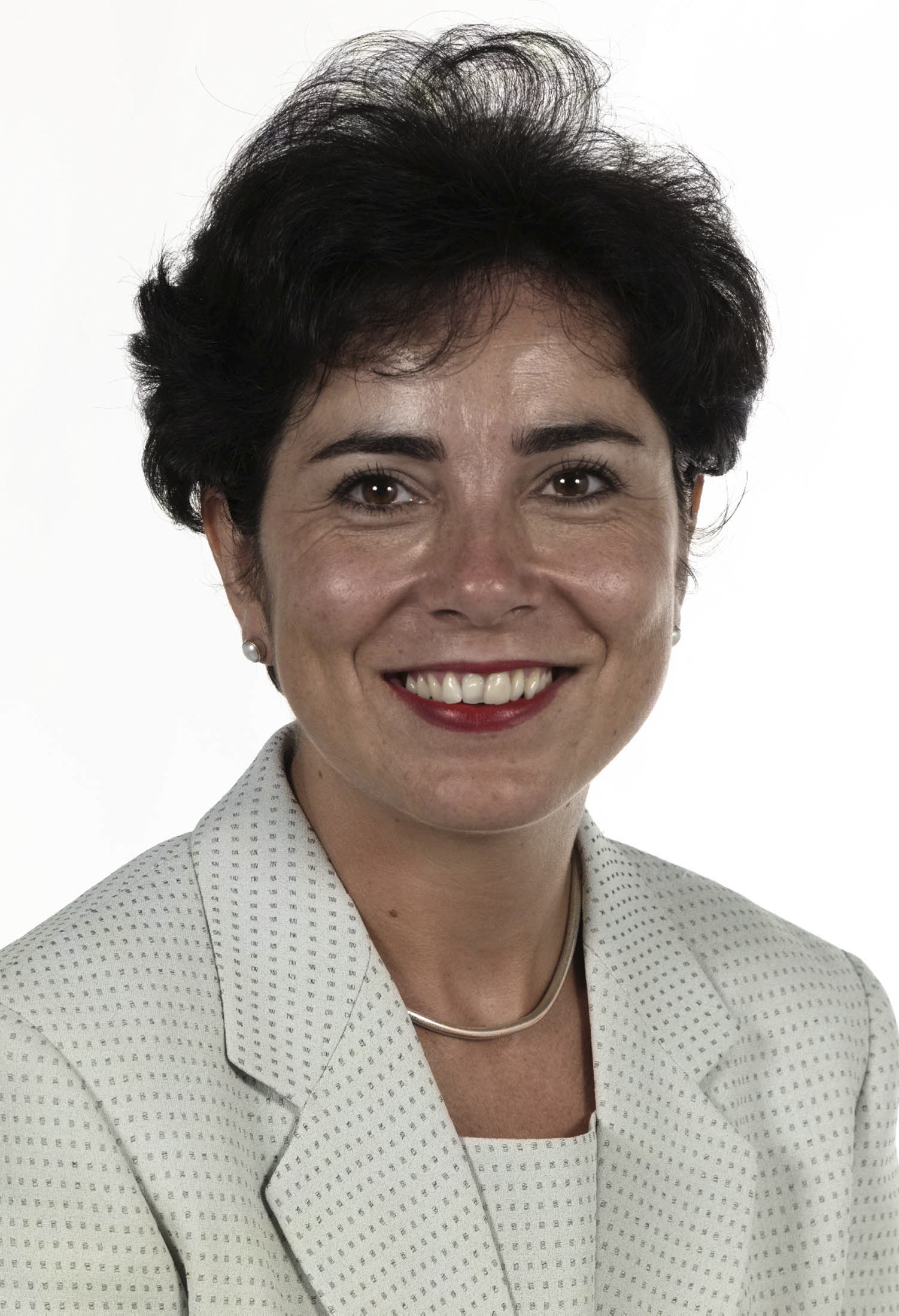
- Official portrait, 1999

Member of the European Parliament for North East England
- In office 10 June 1999 – 10 June 2004
- Preceded by: Constituency established
- Succeeded by: Constituency abolished

Personal details
- Born: Barbara Maria O'Toole; 24 February 1960 (age 66)
- Party: Labour
- Education: University of Leeds

Barbara Maria O'Toole (born 24 February 1960), known as Mo O'Toole, is a former politician in the United Kingdom.

O'Toole attended Sacred Heart Convent School in Fenham, Newcastle upon Tyne, then studied at Northumbria University. Soon afterwards, she married future Labour Party MP Alan Milburn, although the couple split in the late 1980s. During this period, O'Toole also served as a Labour Party councillor in Newcastle-upon-Tyne.

O'Toole then completed a PhD at the University of Newcastle upon Tyne, then became a lecturer in Government and Public Policy, first at the University of Bristol, then at Newcastle. At the European Parliament election, 1999, she was elected for the Labour Party in North East England from third on the party list. She lost her seat in 2004, despite being moved up to second on the party list. O'Toole was on an all-woman shortlist to be the Labour candidate in the safe seat of Bishop Auckland at the 2005 general election, but was not selected.

Since 2008 she has been a visiting professor and the Jean Monnet Fellow at Newcastle University.
