= 2014 European Parliament election in the United Kingdom =

- 22 May 2014

All 73 United Kingdom seats to the European Parliament
- Registered: 46,481,532 (Note: The number of registered voters included EU nationals who are not eligible to vote in UK general elections)
- Turnout: 35.6% ▲0.9%
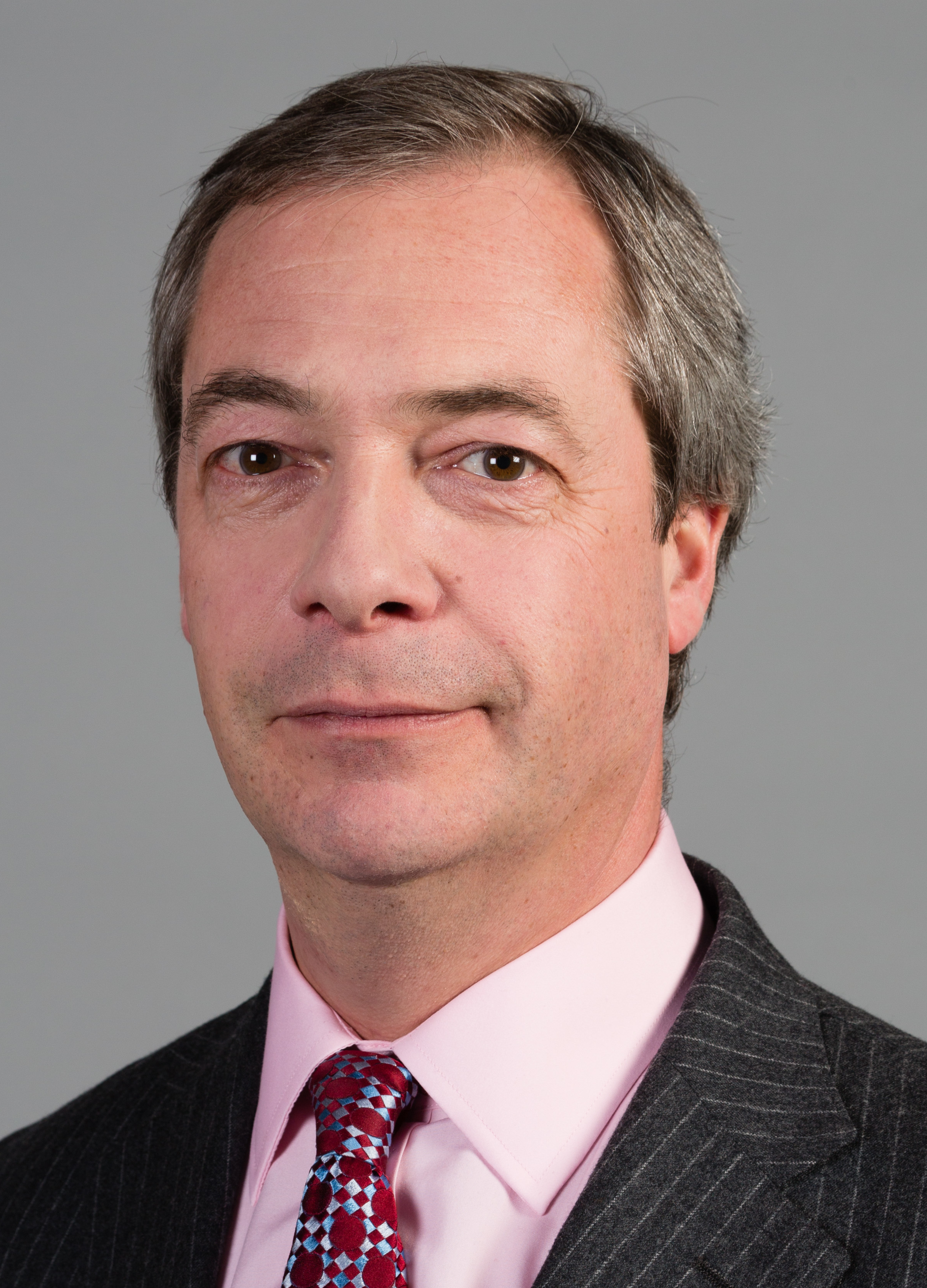

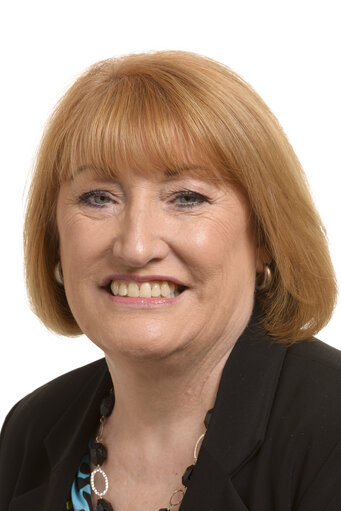

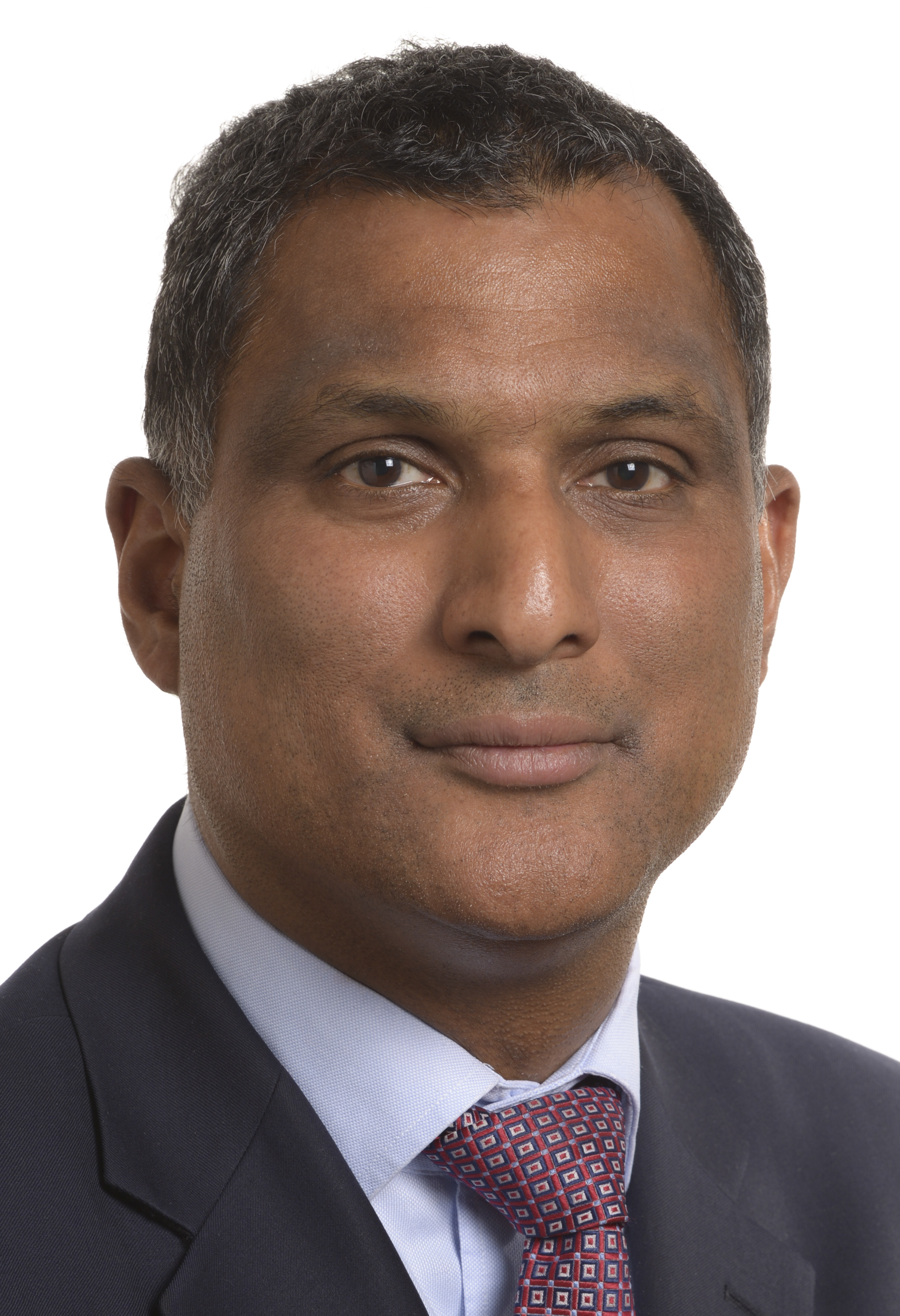

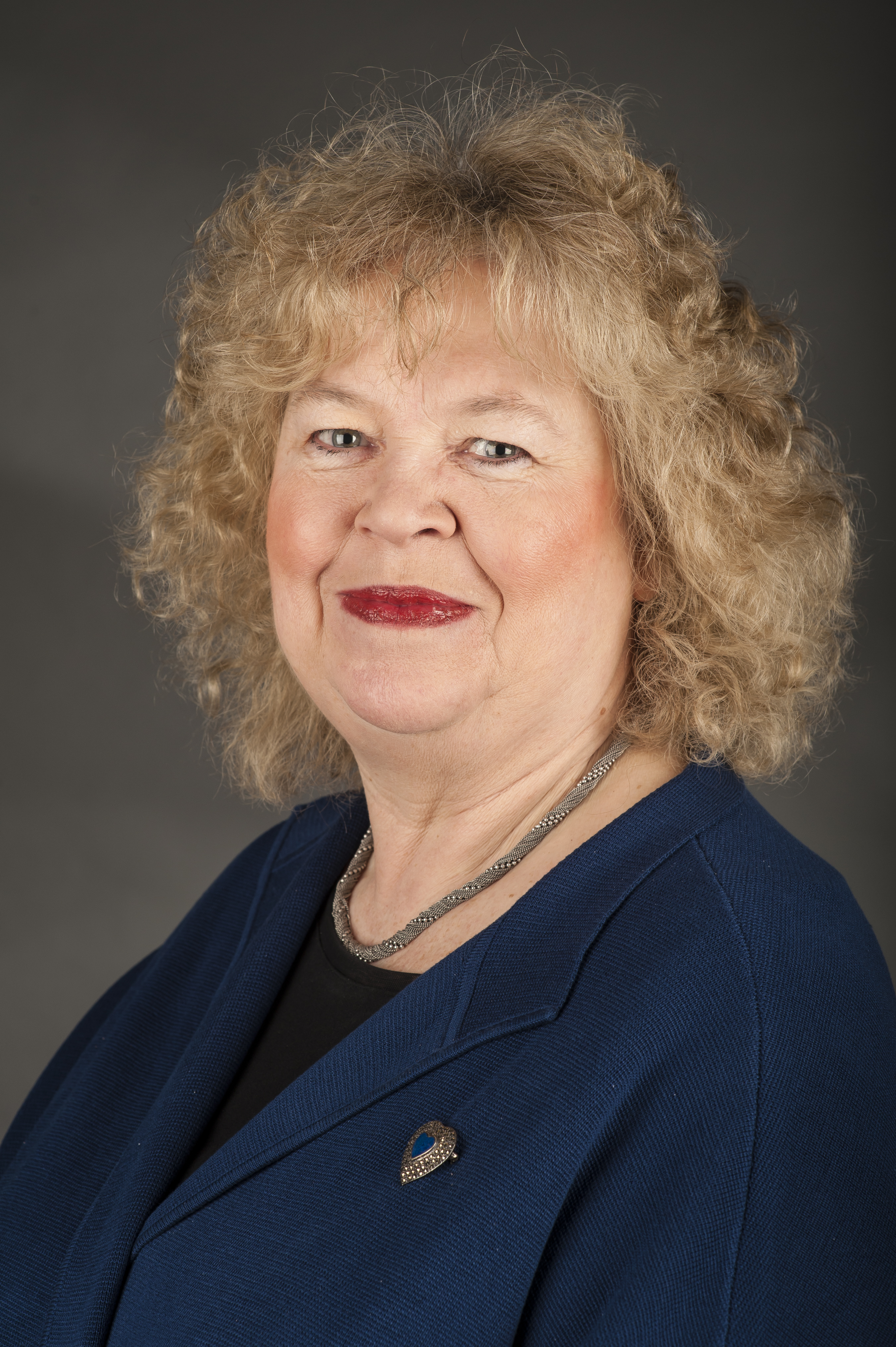

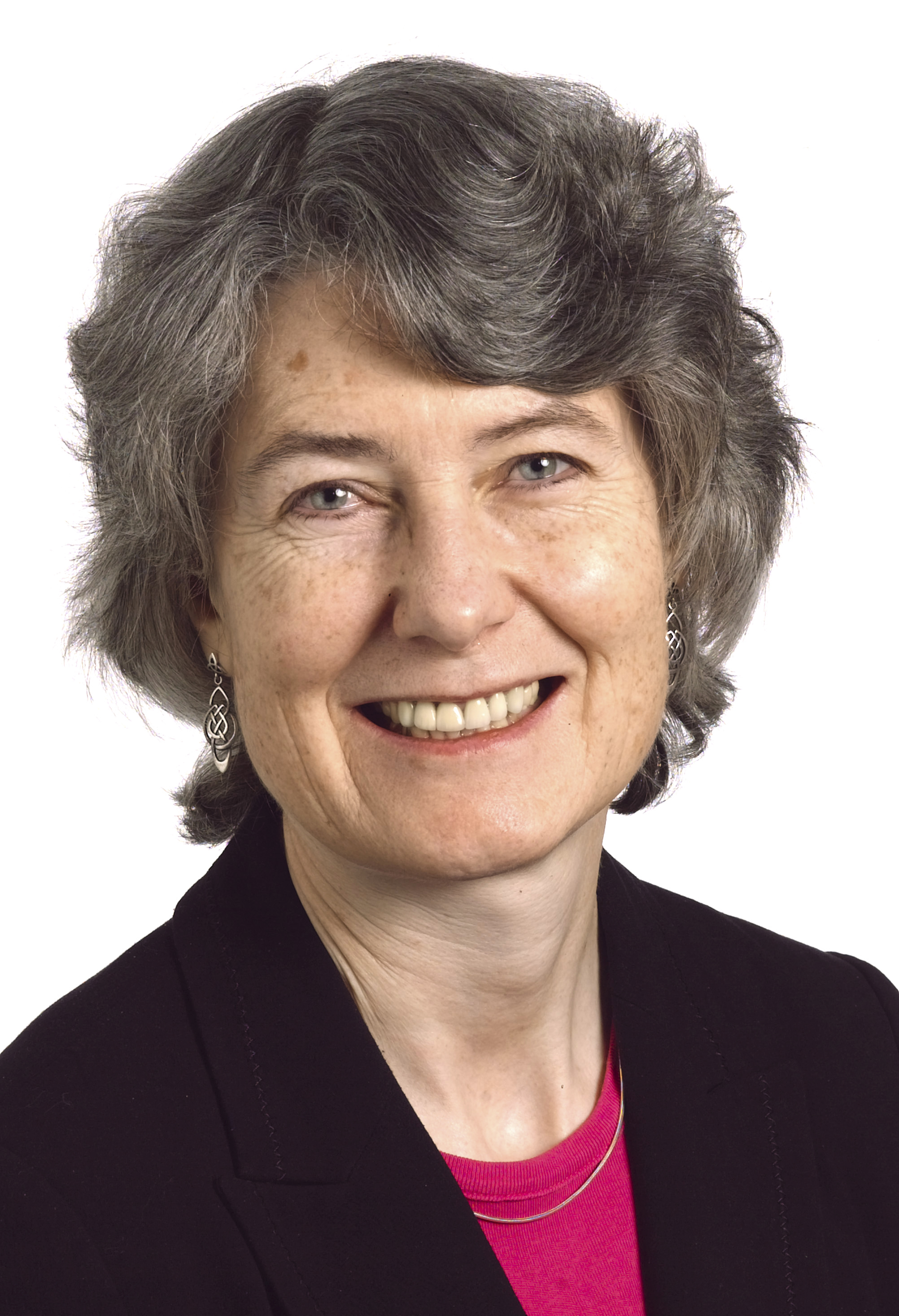

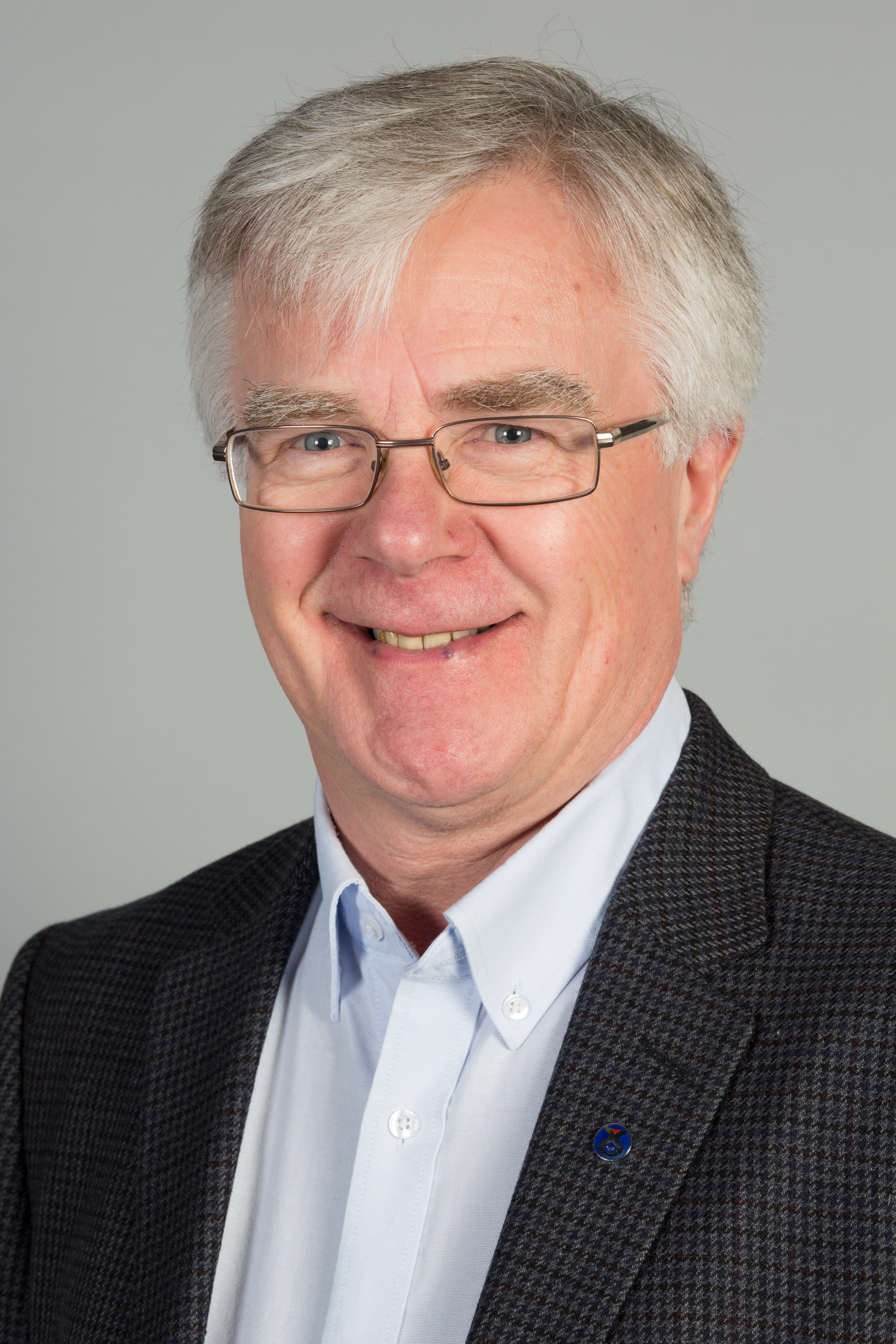
| | First party | Second party | Third party |
|---|---|---|---|
| Leader | Nigel Farage | Glenis Willmott | Syed Kamall |
| Party | UKIP | Labour | Conservative |
| Alliance | EFDD | S&D | ECR |
| Leader since | 5 November 2010 | 18 January 2009 | 19 November 2013 |
| Leader's seat | South East England | East Midlands | London |
| Last election | 13 seats, 16.0% | 13 seats, 15.2% | 26 seats, (Note: In 2009, the Conservatives were in alliance with the Ulster Unionist Party in Northern Ireland as Ulster Conservatives and Unionists, electing 1 Northern Irish MEP under this label. By 2014 the UCUNF alliance had been dissolved.) 27.4% |
| Seats won | 24 | 20 | 19 |
| Seat change | ▲11 | ▲7 | ▼7 |
| Popular vote | 4,376,635 | 4,020,646 | 3,792,549 |
| Percentage | 26.6% | 24.4% | 23.1% |
| Swing | ▲10.6% | ▲9.2% | ▼4.3% |
| | Fourth party | Fifth party | Sixth party |
| Leader | Jean Lambert (Note: Lambert was the longest-serving Green MEP.) | Fiona Hall | Ian Hudghton (Note: Hudghton was the SNP's lead candidate.) |
| Party | Green | Liberal Democrats | SNP |
| Alliance | Green | ALDE | EFA |
| Leader since | 6 May 2010 | 21 July 2009 | June 1999 |
| Leader's seat | London | North East England (stood down) | Scotland |
| Last election | 2 seats, 7.8% | 11 seats, 13.3% | 2 seats, 2.1% |
| Seats before | 2 | 11 | 2 |
| Seats won | 3 | 1 | 2 |
| Seat change | ▲1 | ▼10 | Steady |
| Popular vote | 1,136,670 | 1,087,633 | 389,503 |
| Percentage | 6.9% | 6.6% | 2.3% |
| Swing | ▼0.9% | ▼6.7% | ▲0.3% |
- Map of the 2014 European Parliamentary Election in the United Kingdom

Leader of Largest Party before election
David Cameron
Conservative
Subsequent Leader of Largest Party
Nigel Farage
UKIP

The 2014 European Parliament election was the United Kingdom's component of the 2014 European Parliament election, held on Thursday 22 May 2014, coinciding with the 2014 local elections in England and Northern Ireland. In total, 73 Members of the European Parliament were elected from the United Kingdom using proportional representation. England, Scotland and Wales use a closed-list party list system of PR (with the D'Hondt method), while Northern Ireland used the single transferable vote (STV).

Most of the election results were announced after 10pm on Sunday 25 May – with the exception of Scotland, which did not declare its results until the following day – after voting closed throughout the 28 member states of the European Union.

The most successful party overall was the UK Independence Party (UKIP) which won 24 seats and 27% of the popular vote, the first time a political party other than the Labour Party or Conservative Party had won the popular vote at a British election since the 1906 general election. It was also the first time a party other than Labour or Conservative had won the largest number of seats in a national election since the December 1910 general election. In addition, the 23.1% of the vote won by the Conservatives was the lowest recorded vote share for the party in a national election until 2019.

The Labour Party became the first Official Opposition party since 1984 to fail to win a European Parliament election, although it did gain 7 seats, taking its overall tally to 20. The governing Conservative Party was pushed into third place for the first time at any European Parliament election, falling to 19 seats, while the Green Party of England and Wales saw its number of MEPs increase for the first time since 1999, winning 3 seats. In Scotland, the Scottish National Party won the largest share of the vote, taking 29% of the vote and 2 MEPs. The Liberal Democrats, who were in government in the UK with the Conservatives at the time, lost 10 of the 11 seats they were defending, and won just 7% of the popular vote.

Figures released in December 2014 showed that the Conservatives and UKIP each spent £2.96m on the campaign, the Liberal Democrats £1.5m, and the Labour Party approximately £1m.

== Voting system and regional representation ==
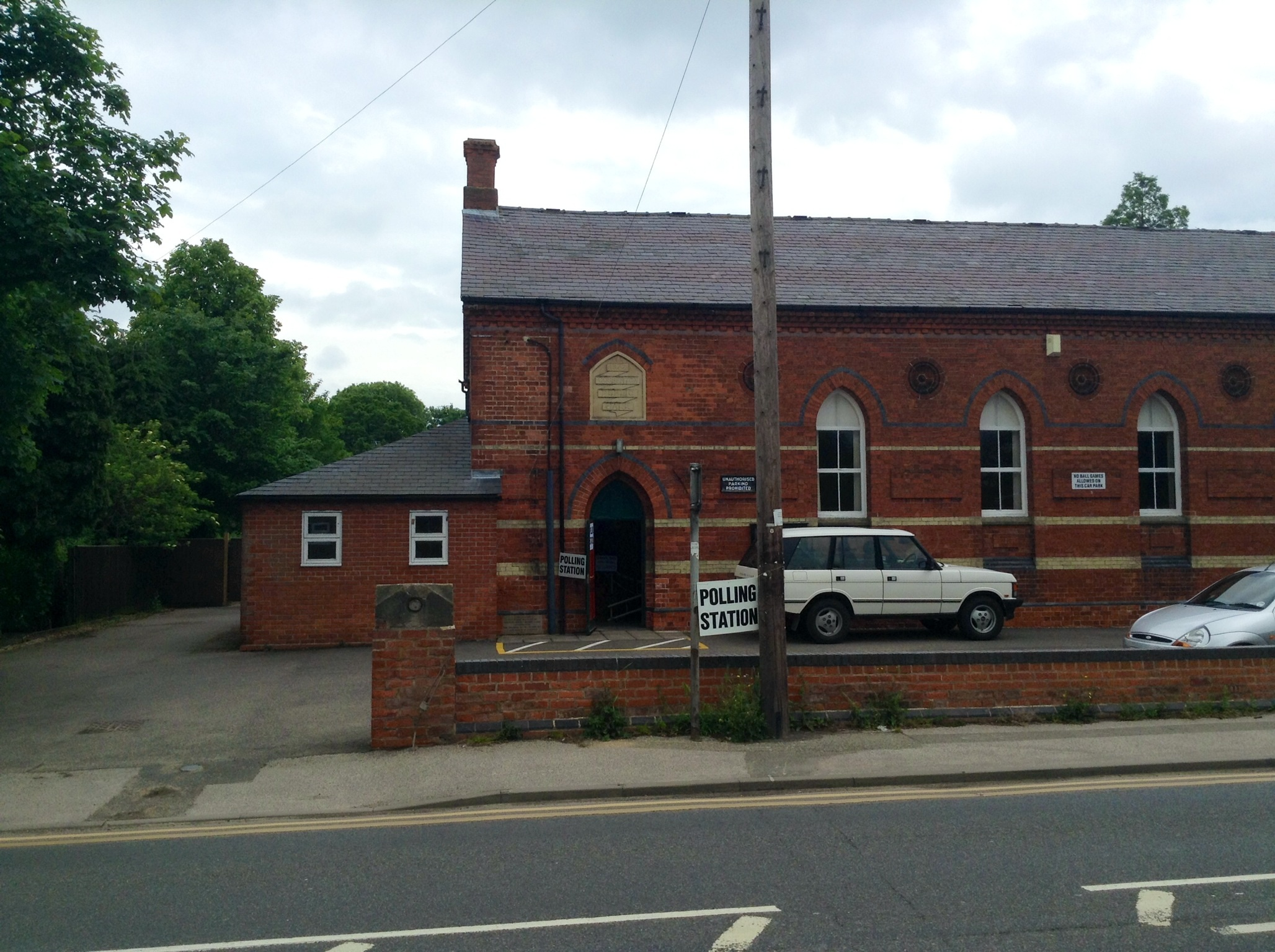
Polling station in Gosberton in Lincolnshire within the East Midlands constituency on 22 May 2014

The United Kingdom elected 73 Members of the European Parliament using proportional representation. The United Kingdom was divided into twelve multi-member constituencies. The eleven of these regions which form Great Britain used a closed-list party list system method of proportional representation, calculated using the D'Hondt method. Northern Ireland used the Single transferable vote (STV). As a result of the Treaty of Lisbon coming into force, the UK became entitled to a 73rd MEP as from November 2011. The Electoral Commission performed a reallocation in keeping with the same procedures it used to allocate 72 MEPs; an extra Conservative MEP was allocated to the West Midlands constituency, based on the 2009 vote, and was enshrined in the European Union Act 2011 as an amendment of the European Parliamentary Elections Act 2002.

Representation by region
| Electoral region | 2009 election | 2014 election | +/- |
|---|---|---|---|
| East Midlands | 5 | 5 | Steady |
| East of England | 7 | 7 | Steady |
| London | 8 | 8 | Steady |
| North East England | 3 | 3 | Steady |
| North West England | 8 | 8 | Steady |
| South East England | 10 | 10 | Steady |
| South West England^{1} | 6 | 6 | Steady |
| West Midlands | 6 | 7 | ▲1 |
| Yorkshire and the Humber | 6 | 6 | Steady |
| Wales | 4 | 4 | Steady |
| Scotland | 6 | 6 | Steady |
| Northern Ireland | 3 | 3 | Steady |

^{1} Includes Gibraltar, the only British Overseas Territory which was part of the European Union.

=== Returning officers ===
The European Parliamentary Elections (Returning Officers) Order 2013 provides for the designated Returning officer for each electoral region to be the council official responsible for elections in each of the following Westminster constituencies: Kettering for the East Midlands, Chelmsford for the Eastern region, Lewisham, Deptford for the London region, Sunderland Central for the North East region, Manchester Central for the North West region, Falkirk for Scotland, Southampton, Test for the South East region, Poole for the South West region, Preseli Pembrokeshire for Wales, Birmingham Ladywood for the West Midlands region, Leeds Central for the Yorkshire and Humber region, and Belfast South for the Northern Ireland Region.

== MEPs before the 2014 election, by European Parliament group ==
Between the 2009 and 2014 elections, there were various changes to the breakdown of UK members. In December 2011, a 73rd member from the UK (Anthea McIntyre, Conservative) was allocated to England because of the implementation of the Treaty of Lisbon. There were also various defections:

- one Conservative MEP (Edward McMillan-Scott) defected to the Liberal Democrats (March 2010);
- one Conservative MEP (Roger Helmer) defected to UKIP (March 2012);
- two UKIP MEPs (David Campbell Bannerman in May 2011 and Marta Andreasen in February 2013) defected to the Conservatives;
- one UKIP MEP (Nikki Sinclaire) left the party, and later founded the We Demand a Referendum party;
- one UKIP MEP (Mike Nattrass) left the party in September 2013, and later founded An Independence from Europe;
- one UKIP MEP (Godfrey Bloom) left the party in September 2013, and sat as an independent;
- one BNP MEP (Andrew Brons) left the party, and later founded the British Democratic Party.

The Ulster Conservatives and Unionists – New Force (UCUNF) electoral pact between the Conservatives and the Ulster Unionist Party (UUP) was dissolved.

Thus, before the 2014 election, the following parties had MEPs representing UK constituencies:

Parties in the European Parliament (UK) before the 2014 election
| United Kingdom party | Seats/73 | European Parliament group | Seats/766 |
|---|---|---|---|
| Conservative | 26 | European Conservatives and Reformists | 52 |
| UUP | 1 | European Conservatives and Reformists | 52 |
| Labour | 13 | Progressive Alliance of Socialists and Democrats | 195 |
| Liberal Democrats | 12 | Alliance of Liberals and Democrats for Europe | 75 |
| UKIP | 9 | Europe of Freedom and Democracy | 31 |
| Independent | 1 | Europe of Freedom and Democracy | 31 |
| Green | 2 | Greens–European Free Alliance | 52 |
| Scottish National | 2 | Greens–European Free Alliance | 52 |
| Plaid Cymru | 1 | Greens–European Free Alliance | 52 |
| Sinn Féin | 1 | European United Left–Nordic Green Left | 35 |
| Democratic Unionist | 1 | Non-Inscrits | – |
| British Democratic | 1 | Non-Inscrits | – |
| British National | 1 | Non-Inscrits | – |
| We Demand a Referendum | 1 | Non-Inscrits | – |
| An Independence from Europe | 1 | Non-Inscrits | – |

== Parties and candidates ==
39 parties stood a total of 747 candidates. The Conservative Party and UKIP had candidates in every region, as did the three Green parties. Labour, the Liberal Democrats and the BNP had a full slate of candidates in all the regions in Great Britain (i.e. excluding Northern Ireland). The English Democrats and An Independence from Europe had a full slate of candidates in all the English regions. No2EU had a full slate in seven regions, while Britain First and the Socialist Party of Great Britain had full slates in two regions each. The Harmony Party stood in four regions and the Christian Peoples Alliance in three regions. Other parties only stood in one region.

== Retiring/resigned incumbents ==
=== British Democratic Party ===
(Elected in 2009 as British National Party)

- Andrew Brons – Yorkshire and the Humber

=== Conservative ===
- Struan Stevenson (Scotland)
- Sir Robert Atkins (North West England)
- Giles Chichester (South West England and Gibraltar)
- Robert Sturdy (East of England)

=== Green ===
- Caroline Lucas (South East England) – Resigned 17 May 2010 & replaced by Keith Taylor

=== Labour ===
- Michael Cashman (West Midlands)
- Stephen Hughes (North East England)
- Arlene McCarthy (North West England)
- Brian Simpson (North West England)
- Peter Skinner (South East England)

=== Liberal Democrats ===
- Diana Wallis (Yorkshire and the Humber) – Resigned 31 January 2012 & replaced by Rebecca Taylor
- Liz Lynne (West Midlands) – Resigned 4 February 2012 & replaced by Phil Bennion
- Sharon Bowles – (South East England)
- Rebecca Taylor (Yorkshire and the Humber)
- Fiona Hall (North East England)

=== UKIP ===
- John Bufton (Wales)
- Trevor Colman (South West England and Gibraltar)
- Derek Clark (East Midlands)
- Godfrey Bloom (Yorkshire & Humber), Having spent the last 8 months of his term as an independent

== Debates ==
On 20 February, the Deputy Prime Minister Nick Clegg used his weekly phone-in show on LBC 97.3 to challenge the leader of the UK Independence Party, Nigel Farage, to a live public debate on the UK's membership of the European Union. Clegg said, "he is the leader of the party of 'out'; I am the leader of the party of 'in'. I think it's time we now have a proper, public debate so that the public can listen to the two sides of the argument and judge from themselves." Farage accepted, but said he would also like to see Ed Miliband and David Cameron participate.

The first hour-long debate between the two men was held on 26 March 2014 and was broadcast live on television by Sky News and on the BBC News Channel. The debate was hosted by LBC and moderated by Nick Ferrari. After the first debate, a YouGov poll asked "Who performed better?", with 57% saying Farage did better compared to 36% for Clegg.

The second debate was held on BBC Two on 2 April in a special programme called The European Union: In or Out, moderated by David Dimbleby. Farage was again seen as outperforming his rival, with a snap poll by YouGov showing 68% of people thought he did better in the debate compared to 27% for Clegg. A snap Guardian poll also showed that 69% thought Farage won the debate.

Despite David Cameron and Ed Miliband declining to participate in the leaders' debates, the Conservative and Labour parties were represented in a lower-profile debate on the BBC. On 13 February Andrew Neil hosted a four-way debate on the BBC's Sunday Politics programme. The Conservatives were represented by Syed Kamall MEP, Labour by Richard Howitt MEP, the Liberal Democrats by Baroness Sarah Ludford MEP and the UK Independence Party by Patrick O'Flynn, the party's Director of communications and an MEP candidate.

== Opinion polls ==
=== Graphical summary ===
Graph of opinion polls conducted. Trend lines represent local regressions and the grey areas represent uncertainty about the trendlines and not those of the results.

These opinion polls are for Great Britain and generally exclude Northern Ireland. The methodology used for these polls broadly corresponds to that used for opinion polling for the 2015 United Kingdom general election; see that article for the methodology used by each polling company. YouGov have experimented with different methods of polling for these elections, using their own method for their 8–9 January 2013 poll and another corresponding to that used by Survation and ComRes for their 10–11 January 2013 poll (both below) and argue that their method gives more accurate answers. Data for these polls are generally gathered at the same time as the data for General Election polling.

=== 2014 ===
| Date(s) | Polling organisation/client | Sample | Con | UKIP | Lab | Lib Dems | Others | Lead |
|---|---|---|---|---|---|---|---|---|
| 22 May 2014 | EU election, 2014 (GB) results | 16,017,366 | 23.9% | 27.5% | 25.4% | 6.9% | 16.3% | 2.1% |
| 20–21 May | YouGov/The Sun | 6,124 | 22% | 27% | 26% | 9% | 16% (BNP 1%) | 1% |
| 19–21 May | Opinium/Daily Mail | 1,967 | 21% | 32% | 25% | 6% | 16% | 7% |
| 19–20 May | Survation/Mirror | 1,106 | 23% | 32% | 27% | 9% | 11% | 5% |
| 19–20 May | YouGov/The Sun | 1,874 | 23% | 27% | 27% | 10% | 14% (BNP 1%) | Tied |
| 18–19 May | YouGov/The Sun | 1,740 | 21% | 24% | 28% | 10% | 17% (BNP 1%) | 4% |
| 15–19 May | TNS | 1,217 | 21% | 31% | 28% | 7% | 13% | 3% |
| 16–18 May | ComRes | 2,061 | 20% | 33% | 27% | 7% | 13% | 6% |
| 15–16 May | YouGov/Sunday Times | 1,892 | 23% | 26% | 27% | 9% | 14% | 1% |
| 13–16 May | Opinium/Daily Mail | 2,036 | 20% | 31% | 29% | 5% | 15% | 2% |
| 14–15 May | ICM/Sunday Telegraph | 2,033 | 26% | 25% | 29% | 7% | 13% | 3% |
| 14–15 May | ComRes | 2,045 | 20% | 35% | 24% | 6% | 15% | 11% |
| 13–14 May | YouGov/The Sun | 1,968 | 22% | 25% | 28% | 10% | 15% (BNP 0%) | 3% |
| 9–12 May | Opinium | 1,936 | 22% | 30% | 28% | 7% | 13% | 2% |
| 9–11 May | ICM/The Guardian | 1,000 | 27% | 26% | 24% | 7% | 16% | 1% |
| 9–11 May | ComRes/C4M | 2,056 | 22% | 34% | 24% | 8% | 12% | 10% |
| 9 May | Survation/Mail on Sunday | 1,005 | 21% | 32% | 28% | 9% | 11% | 4% |
| 6–8 May | Opinium/Daily Mail | 1,972 | 23% | 28% | 27% | 8% | 14% | 1% |
| 28 Apr – 6 May | YouGov/Sky News | 1,933 | 23% | 31% | 25% | 9% | 14% | 6% |
| 2–3 May | Survation/Mirror | 1,005 | 24% | 31% | 28% | 7% | 10% | 3% |
| 1–2 May | YouGov/Sunday Times | 1,945 | 22% | 29% | 28% | 7% | 14% | 1% |
| 30 Apr – 1 May | YouGov/Sun on Sunday | 1,844 | 23% | 29% | 26% | 10% | 12% | 3% |
| 30 Apr – 1 May | YouGov/The Sun | 1,813 | 22% | 27% | 30% | 9% | 13% (BNP 1%) | 3% |
| 27–30 Apr | YouGov/The Sun | 5,331 | 22% | 28% | 29% | 9% | 13% (BNP 1%) | 1% |
| 24–28 Apr | TNS | 1,199 | 18% | 36% | 27% | 10% | 12% | 9% |
| 25–27 Apr | ComRes | 2,052 | 18% | 38% | 27% | 8% | 14% | 11% |
| 24–25 Apr | YouGov/Sunday Times | 1,835 | 19% | 31% | 28% | 9% | 13% | 3% |
| 21–22 Apr | YouGov/The Sun | 2,190 | 22% | 27% | 30% | 10% | 11% (BNP 1%) | 3% |
| 15–17 Apr | ICM/Sunday Telegraph | 2,000 | 22% | 27% | 30% | 8% | 13% | 3% |
| 11–13 Apr | ICM/The Guardian | 1,000 | 25% | 20% | 36% | 6% | 13% | 11% |
| 3–7 Apr | TNS | 1,193 | 21% | 29% | 30% | 9% | 11% | 1% |
| 4–6 Apr | Populus/Financial Times | 2,034 | 27% | 25% | 31% | 10% | 7% | 4% |
| 3–4 Apr | YouGov/Sunday Times | 1,998 | 22% | 28% | 30% | 9% | 10% | 2% |
| 4 Apr | Survation/Mail on Sunday | 1,001 | 21% | 27% | 34% | 9% | 9% | 7% |
| 2–3 Apr | ComRes/The People | 2,067 | 22% | 30% | 30% | 8% | 10% | Tied |
| 2 Apr | Broadcast of The European Union: In or Out debate. | | | | | | | |
| 27–28 Mar | YouGov/The Sunday Times | 1,916 | 24% | 23% | 32% | 11% | 10% | 8% |
| 26–27 Mar | YouGov/The Sun | 2,039 | 24% | 26% | 28% | 11% | 11% | 2% |
| 26 Mar | LBC radio debate on the European Union between the Lib Dems' Nick Clegg and Nigel Farage of UKIP. | | | | | | | |
| 20–21 Mar | Survation/Mail on Sunday | 1,000 | 28% | 23% | 32% | 7% | 10% | 4% |
| 17–18 Mar | YouGov/Times | 2,284 | 24% | 23% | 32% | 10% | 11% | 8% |
| 12–13 Mar | ComRes/Independent on Sunday | 2,001 | 21% | 30% | 28% | 8% | 13% | 2% |
| 7–9 Feb | ICM/The Guardian | 1,002 | 25% | 20% | 35% | 9% | 11% | 10% |
| 14–15 Jan | YouGov/The Sun | 1,893 | 23% | 26% | 32% | 9% | 10% | 6% |
| 3 Jan | Survation/Mail on Sunday | 1,001 | 23% | 26% | 32% | 9% | 10% | 6% |

=== 2013 ===
| Date(s) | Polling organisation/client | Sample | Con | UKIP | Lab | Lib Dems | Others | Lead |
|---|---|---|---|---|---|---|---|---|
| 21–22 Nov | Survation/Daily Star | 1,006 | 24% | 25% | 32% | 8% | 12% | 7% |
| 11 Oct | Survation/Mail on Sunday | 1,017 | 21% | 22% | 35% | 11% | 11% | 13% |
| 22–24 May | ComRes/Open Europe | 2,003 | 21% | 27% | 23% | 18% | 11% | 4% |
| 17–18 May | Survation/Mail on Sunday | 1,000 | 20% | 30% | 31% | 8% | 11% | 1% |
| 17–18 Jan | YouGov/The Sun | 1,912 | 30% | 12% | 38% | 13% | 10% | 8% |
| 10–11 Jan | YouGov/The Sun | 1,995 | 24% | 19% | 36% | 12% | 10% | 12% |
| 9–10 Jan | ComRes/Sunday People | 2,002 | 22% | 23% | 35% | 8% | 12% | 12% |
| 8–9 Jan | YouGov/The Sun | 1,980 | 27% | 17% | 38% | 12% | 6% | 11% |
| 5 Jan | Survation/Mail on Sunday | 772 | 24% | 22% | 31% | 11% | 12% | 7% |
| 4 Jun 2009 | EU election, 2009 (GB) Results | 15,136,932 | 27.7% | 16.5% | 15.7% | 13.7% | 25.6% | 11.2% |

=== Scottish polls ===
| Date(s) | Polling organisation/client | Sample | SNP | Lab | Con | Lib Dems | UKIP | Others | Lead |
|---|---|---|---|---|---|---|---|---|---|
| 22 May 2014 | EU election, 2014 (Scotland) | 1,343,483 | 29.0% | 25.9% | 17.2% | 7.1% | 10.5% | 10.4% | 3.1% |
| 12–15 May 2014 | ICM/Scotsman | 1,003 | 36% | 27% | 13% | 7% | 9% | 8% | 9% |
| 9–12 May 2014 | Survation/Daily Record | 1,003 | 37% | 26% | 13% | 6% | 11% | 7% | 11% |
| 11–22 Apr 2014 | YouGov/Edinburgh University | 1,014 | 33% | 31% | 12% | 7% | 10% | 7% | 2% |
| 14–16 Apr 2014 | ICM/Scotland on Sunday | 1,004 | 37% | 28% | 11% | 7% | 10% | 6% | 9% |
| 4–7 Apr 2014 | Survation/Daily Record | 1,002 | 39% | 30% | 14% | 6% | 7% | 5% | 9% |
| 17–21 Mar 2014 | ICM/Scotsman | 1,010 | 41% | 29% | 13% | 5% | 6% | 6% | 12% |
| 21–24 Jan 2014 | ICM/Scotsman | 1,010 | 43% | 24% | 14% | 6% | 7% | 6% | 19% |
| 4 Jun 2009 | EU election, 2009 (Scotland) | 1,104,512 | 29.1% | 20.8% | 16.8% | 11.5% | 5.2% | 16.6% | 8.3% |

=== Welsh polls ===
| Date(s) | Polling organisation/client | Sample | Con | Lab | Plaid | UKIP | Lib Dems | Others | Lead |
|---|---|---|---|---|---|---|---|---|---|
| 22 May 2014 | EU election, 2014 (Wales) Results | 733,060 | 17.4% | 28.2% | 15.3% | 27.6% | 4.0% | 7.7% | 0.6% |
| 12–14 May 2014 | YouGov/ITV | 1,092 | 16% | 33% | 15% | 23% | 7% | 7% | 10% |
| 11–22 Apr 2014 | YouGov/Cardiff University | 1,027 | 18% | 39% | 11% | 20% | 7% | 6% | 19% |
| 10–12 Feb 2014 | YouGov/ITV | 1,250 | 17% | 39% | 12% | 18% | 7% | 7% | 21% |
| 2–4 Dec 2013 | YouGov/ITV | 1,001 | 20% | 41% | 13% | 13% | 8% | 5% | 21% |
| 4 Jun 2009 | EU election, 2009 (Wales) Results | 684,520 | 21.2% | 20.3% | 18.5% | 12.8% | 10.7% | 16.6% | 0.9% |

=== London polls ===
| Date(s) | Polling organisation/client | Sample | Con | Lab | Lib Dems | Green | UKIP | Others | Lead |
|---|---|---|---|---|---|---|---|---|---|
| 22 May 2014 | EU election, 2014 (London) Results | 2,200,475 | 22.5% | 36.7% | 6.7% | 8.9% | 16.9% | 8.3% | 14.2% |
| 6–8 May 2014 | YouGov/Evening Standard | 1,422 | 23% | 37% | 9% | 7% | 21% | 3% | 14% |
| 28–29 Apr 2014 | Survation | 1,001 | 21% | 39% | 13% | 7% | 20% | 1% | 18% |
| 7–9 Apr 2014 | YouGov/Evening Standard | 1,209 | 25% | 33% | 11% | 5% | 24% | 3% | 8% |
| 8–10 Oct 2013 | YouGov/Evening Standard | 1,231 | 23% | 34% | 10% | 9% | 22% | 1% | 11% |
| 4 Jun 2009 | EU election, 2009 (London) Results | 1,751,026 | 27.4% | 21.3% | 13.7% | 10.9% | 10.8% | 15.9% | 6.1% |

== Results ==
=== United Kingdom results ===
| Party | Votes | | | Seats | | |
| Party | Number | % | +/- | Seats | +/- | % |
|---|---|---|---|---|---|---|
| UK Independence Party | 4,376,635 | 26.6 | ▲10.6 | 24 | ▲11 | 32.9 |
| Labour Party | 4,020,646 | 24.4 | ▲9.2 | 20 | ▲7 | 27.4 |
| Conservative Party | 3,792,549 | 23.1 | ▼3.8 | 19 | ▼7 | 26.0 |
| Green Party of England and Wales | 1,136,670 | 6.9 | ▼0.9 | 3 | ▲1 | 4.1 |
| Liberal Democrats | 1,087,633 | 6.6 | ▼6.7 | 1 | ▼10 | 1.4 |
| Scottish National Party | 389,503 | 2.4 | ▲0.3 | 2 | Steady | 2.7 |
| An Independence from Europe | 235,124 | 1.4 | New | 0 | Steady | |
| British National Party | 179,694 | 1.1 | ▼5.0 | 0 | ▼2 | |
| Sinn Féin | 159,813 | 1.0 | ▲0.2 | 1 | Steady | 1.4 |
| DUP | 131,163 | 0.8 | ▲0.2 | 1 | Steady | 1.4 |
| English Democrats | 126,024 | 0.8 | ▼1.0 | 0 | Steady | |
| Plaid Cymru | 111,864 | 0.7 | ▼0.1 | 1 | Steady | 1.4 |
| Scottish Greens | 108,305 | 0.7 | ▲0.1 | 0 | Steady | |
| Ulster Unionist Party | 83,438 | 0.5 | New | 1 | ▲1 | 1.4 |
| SDLP | 81,594 | 0.5 | Steady | 0 | Steady | |
| TUV | 75,806 | 0.5 | Steady | 0 | Steady | |
| Christian Peoples Alliance | 50,222 | 0.3 | ▼1.3 | 0 | Steady | |
| Alliance | 44,432 | 0.3 | ▲0.1 | 0 | Steady | |
| No2EU | 31,757 | 0.2 | ▼0.8 | 0 | Steady | |
| 4 Freedoms Party (UK EPP) | 28,014 | 0.2 | New | 0 | Steady | |
| We Demand a Referendum Now | 23,426 | 0.1 | New | 0 | Steady | |
| NHA | 23,253 | 0.1 | New | 0 | Steady | |
| Animal Welfare Party | 21,092 | 0.1 | Steady | 0 | Steady | |
| Britain First | 20,272 | 0.1 | New | 0 | Steady | |
| Yorkshire First | 19,017 | 0.1 | New | 0 | Steady | |
| Europeans Party | 10,712 | 0.1 | New | 0 | Steady | |
| Green (NI) | 10,598 | 0.1 | Steady | 0 | Steady | |
| NI21 | 10,553 | 0.1 | New | 0 | Steady | |
| Peace Party | 10,130 | 0.1 | Steady | 0 | Steady | |
| Others | 55,011 | 0.3 | ▼3.4 | 0 | Steady | |
| Valid Votes | 16,454,950 | 99.5 | | 73 | ▲1 | |
| Rejected Votes | 90,812 | 0.6 | | | | |
| Registered voters | 46,481,532 | | | | | |

=== Election results by constituency ===
| Constituency | Members |
|---|---|
| East Midlands | |
| East of England | |
| London | |
| North East England | |
| North West England | |
| South East England | |
| South West England | |
| West Midlands | |
| Yorkshire and the Humber | |
| Scotland | |
| Wales | |
| Northern Ireland | |

=== MEPs defeated ===
Conservative

- Marina Yannakoudakis – London
- Martin Callanan – North East
- Marta Andreasen – South East

Liberal Democrats

- Bill Newton Dunn – East Midlands
- Andrew Duff – East of England
- Sarah Ludford – London
- Chris Davies – North West
- Graham Watson – South West
- Phil Bennion – West Midlands
- Edward McMillan-Scott – Yorkshire and the Humber
- George Lyon – Scotland

British National Party

- Nick Griffin – North West

An Independence from Europe

- Mike Nattrass – West Midlands

We Demand a Referendum

- Nikki Sinclaire – West Midlands

=== Analysis ===
The UK Independence Party (UKIP) came top of the poll, the first time a political party other than the Labour Party or Conservative Party had won the popular vote at a British election since the 1906 general election. It was also the first time a party other than Labour or Conservative had won the largest number of seats in a national election since the December 1910 general election. However, by the end of 2018, following multiple departures and other changes, only 9 MEPs remained affiliated to UKIP. By February 2019, there were only 7 UKIP MEPs, while 7 former UKIP MEPs had joined the new Brexit Party.

The Labour Party became the first Official Opposition party since 1984 to fail to win a European Parliament election, although it did gain 7 seats, taking its overall tally to 20. It concurrently won the largest share of the vote in 100 council areas, with its largest vote share recorded in Newham at 58.4%.

The governing Conservative Party was pushed into third place for the first time at any European Parliament election, winning just 23.3% of the national vote share and losing 7 seats to fall to 19 overall, one behind Labour. It won the largest share of the vote in just 89 council areas and its highest vote was recorded in Elmbridge at 43.1%.

The Green Party of England and Wales saw its number of MEPs increase for the first time since 1999, winning a total of 3 seats. The party rose from fifth place to fourth, although its vote share declined slightly compared to 2009. This was the first time since 1989 that the Greens had outpolled the Liberal Democrats in a European election.

In Scotland, the Scottish National Party won the largest share of the vote taking 28.9% of the vote and retained its two of the six Scottish seats.

The Liberal Democrats, who were in coalition with the Conservatives at the time, lost ten of the eleven seats they were defending and won just 6.9% of the vote share nationally. Their highest vote share was recorded in Gibraltar, where they won a 67.2% share of the vote.

== See also ==
- Bloomberg speech
- List of political parties in the United Kingdom
- Opinion polling for the 2015 United Kingdom general election
- 2016 United Kingdom European Union membership referendum
- 2015 United Kingdom general election
