= Durham (European Parliament constituency) =

Former European Parliament constituency

- European Parliament constituency
- Boundary within North East England (1979-1984)
- Member state: United Kingdom
- Created: 1979
- Dissolved: 1999
- MEPs: 1

Prior to its uniform adoption of proportional representation in 1999, the United Kingdom used first-past-the-post for the European elections in England, Scotland and Wales. The European Parliament constituencies used under that system were smaller than the later regional constituencies and only had one Member of the European Parliament each.

The constituency of Durham was one of them.

From 1979 to 1984, it consisted of the Westminster Parliament constituencies of Bishop Auckland, Chester-le-Street, Consett, Darlington, Durham, Durham North West, Easington, and Houghton-le-Spring. From 1984 to 1999 it consisted of: Bishop Auckland, Blaydon, City of Durham, Darlington, Easington, North Durham, North West Durham, Sedgefield.

Boundary within North East England (1984-1994)

Boundary within North East England (1994-1999)

== Members of the European Parliament ==
Election	Member	Party
1979	Roland Boyes	Labour
1984	Stephen Hughes	Labour
1989	Stephen Hughes	Labour
1994	Stephen Hughes	Labour
1999	Constituency abolished: see North East England	

== Election results ==
European elections 1979: Durham
Party	Candidate	Votes	%	±%
Labour	Roland Boyes	81,982	54.2	
Conservative	R. Sheaf	53,043	35.1	
Liberal	Chris Foote Wood	16,094	10.7	
Majority		28,939	19.1	
Turnout		151,029	27.7	
Labour hold		Swing		

European elections 1984: Durham
Party	Candidate	Votes	%	±%
Labour	Stephen Hughes	106,073	57.9	+3.7
Conservative	Hon. W.R.F. Vane	44,846	24.5	−10.6
Liberal	Chris Foote Wood	32,307	17.6	+6.9
Majority		61,227	33.4	+14.3
Turnout		183,226	34.6	+6.9
Labour hold		Swing		

European elections 1989: Durham
Party	Candidate	Votes	%	±%
Labour	Stephen Hughes	124,448	65.8	+7.9
Conservative	Robert Hull	37,600	19.9	−4.6
Green	Miss Hazel I. Lennox	18,770	9.9	New
SLD	Peter Freitag	8,369	4.4	−13.2
Majority		86,848	45.9	+11.5
Turnout		189,187	35.7	+1.1
Labour hold		Swing		

European elections 1994: Durham
Party	Candidate	Votes	%	±%
Labour	Stephen Hughes	136,671	72.1	+6.3
Conservative	Philip Bradbourn	25,033	13.2	−6.7
Liberal Democrats	Nigel Martin	20,935	11.1	+6.7
Green	Simeon R. Hope	5,670	3.0	−6.9
Natural Law	Christopher J. Adamson	1,198	0.6	New
Majority		111,638	58.9	+13.0
Turnout		532,051	35.6	−0.1
Labour hold		Swing		
