= Alan Donnelly =

British Labour Party politician and former trade unionist

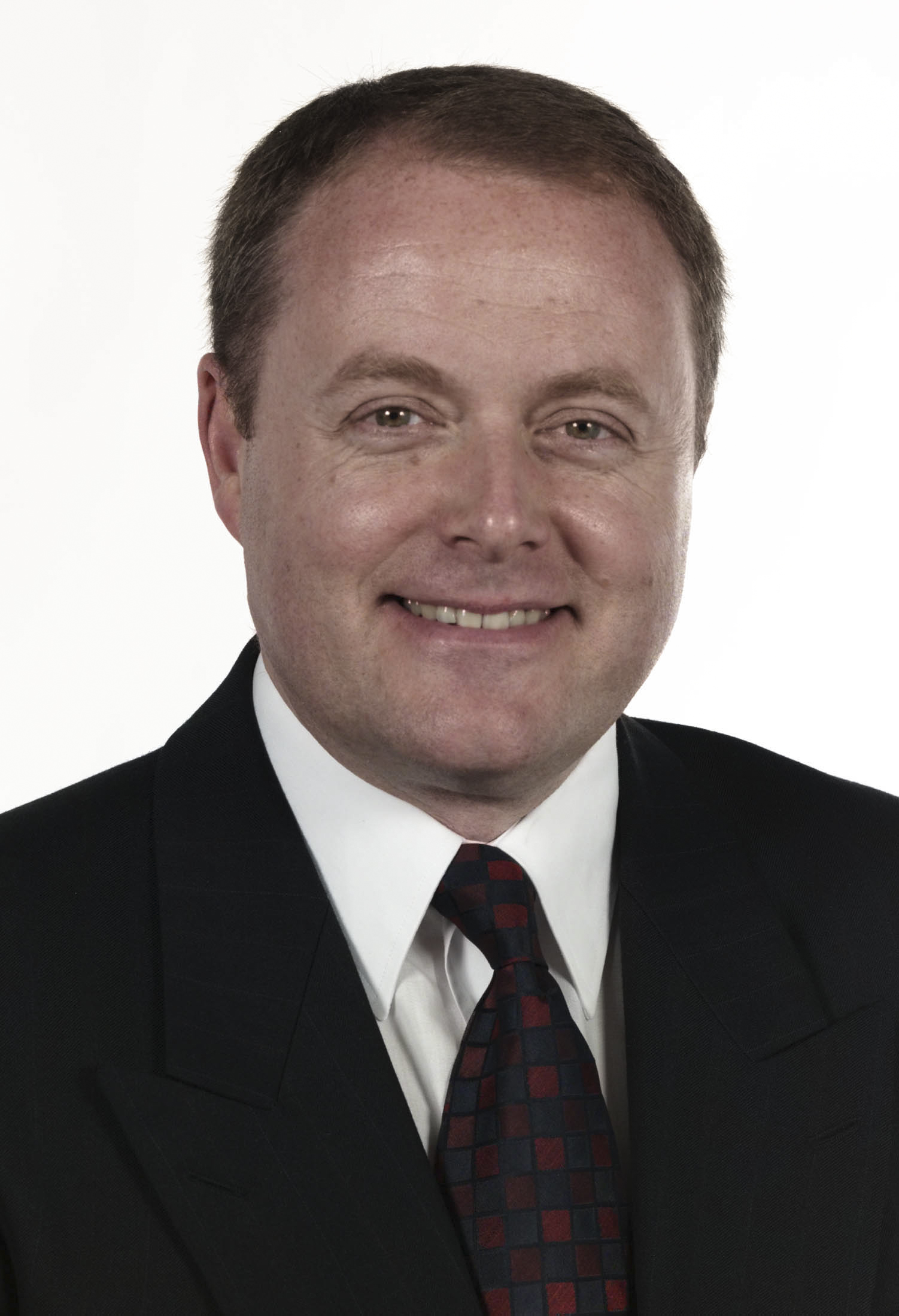
Official portrait, 1999

Alan John Donnelly (born 16 July 1957) is a British Labour Party politician and former trade unionist from Jarrow. He served as a Member of the European Parliament (MEP) and as leader of the European Parliamentary Labour Party.

== Career ==
Donnelly was first elected to the European Parliament in 1989, representing the Tyne and Wear constituency. He took 69.3% of the vote in 1989, winning by a majority of 95,780. He was re-elected in 1994, winning 74.4% of the vote. When European Parliament constituencies were abolished in June 1999 and replaced by multi-member regional seats, Donnelly was selected as the first candidate on the Labour list in the North East and was elected. He resigned in December 1999, after being leader of the European Parliamentary Labour Party since 1997.

Before becoming an MEP, Donnelly worked for the GMB trade union, first in the North East region, and then as National Finance Officer in London. During this time he was part the St Ermin's group of moderate trade unions that met in St. Ermin's Hotel to plan the expulsion of the Militant tendency from the Labour Party. As an MEP, he was later seen as a key ally of Tony Blair and served on the National Executive Committee.

He is currently the executive chairman of Sovereign Strategy, a public affairs company that he founded in January 2000. The company now has offices in Newcastle, London, and Brussels.

Donnelly has worked closely with Bernie Ecclestone and Max Mosley, becoming chief race steward in 2007–09. He has also been chair of the South Shields Labour Party since 2005. When David Miliband resigned from this seat in 2013, it was Donnelly that he wrote his resignation letter to.

He is openly gay.

Party political offices
Preceded by Wayne David	Leader of the European Parliamentary Labour Party; 1998–1999	Succeeded by Simon Murphy
