= The European Union: In or Out =

British television debate

- Genre: Factual
- Presented by: David Dimbleby
- Starring: Nick Clegg; Nigel Farage
- Country of origin: United Kingdom
- Original language: English

Production
- Production location: Broadcasting House
- Editor: Will Boden
- Running time: 60 minutes

Original release
- Network: BBC Two; BBC Two HD
- Release: 2 April 2014

The European Union: In or Out is a British television debate that was first broadcast on BBC Two on 2 April 2014. The hour long live debate between Nick Clegg and Nigel Farage was hosted by David Dimbleby. Questions came from the audience, with an equal number of people for and against British membership of the European Union.

A radio debate between Clegg and Farage on LBC, hosted by Nick Ferrari, was broadcast one week before the televised debate. The debate was broadcast ahead of the European Parliament election, 2014, and was set across the backdrop of a proposed referendum on United Kingdom membership of the European Union.

Snap polls by YouGov and ICM suggested that Farage performed best in the debate. The YouGov survey suggested 68% thought Farage had performed best in the debate, compared to 27% who favoured Clegg with a Guardian/ICM giving similar results. The BBC's Nick Robinson wrote in his analysis: "History will record that Nigel Farage was the winner of these debates. Nick Clegg will hope that, nevertheless, he may have won something too by being seen to challenge Britain's political insurgent."

== See also ==
- 2010 United Kingdom general election debates
- 2015 United Kingdom general election debates
- People's Pledge
- 2016 United Kingdom European Union membership referendum
- Campaigning in the 2016 United Kingdom European Union membership referendum
