= 2004 European Parliament election in the United Kingdom =

- 10 June 2004

All 78 of the United Kingdom's seats in the European Parliament
- Turnout: 38.5% ▲14.5%
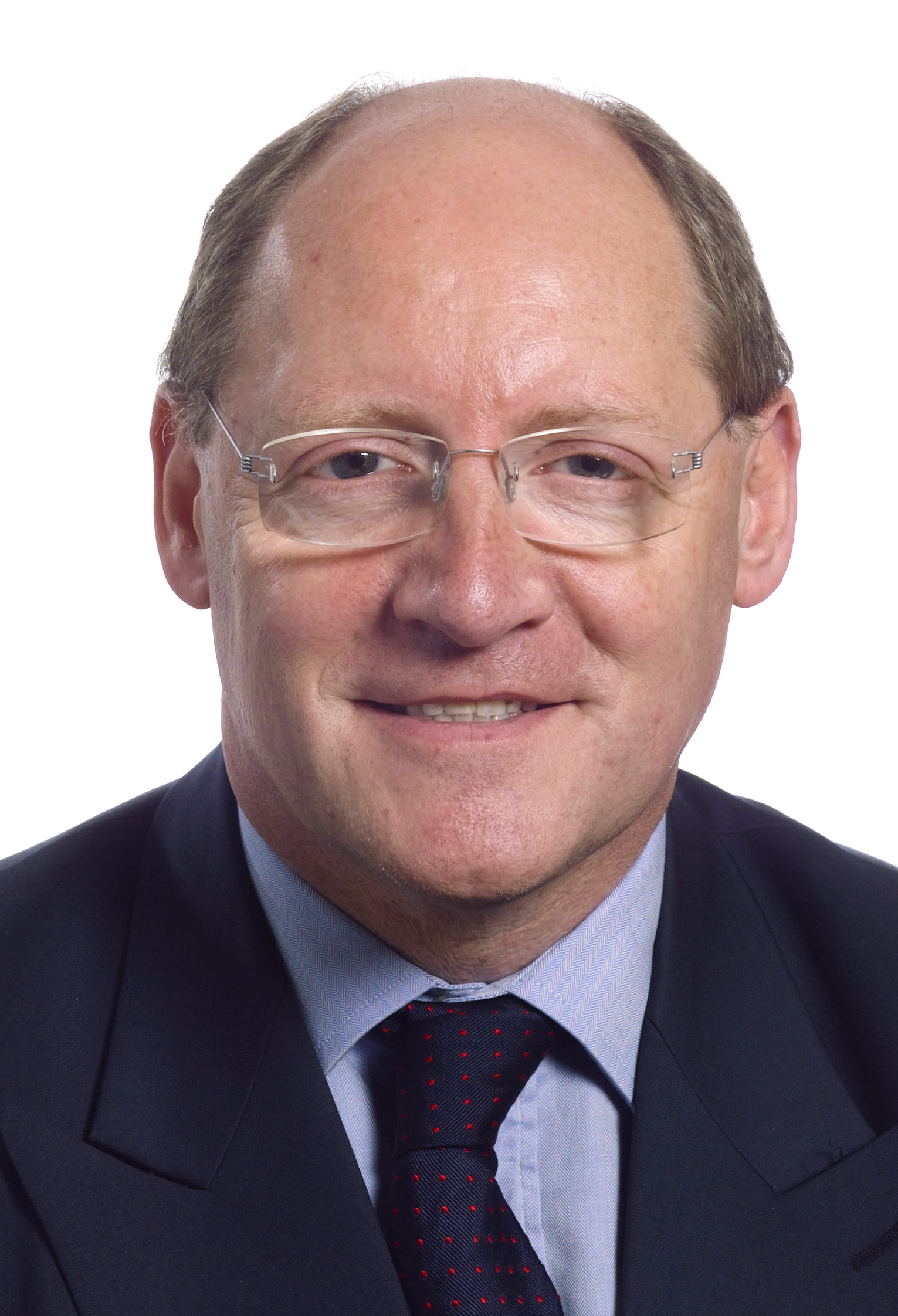

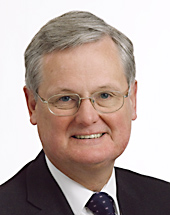

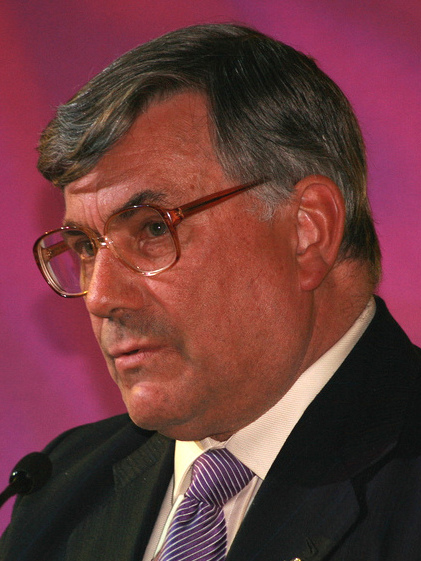

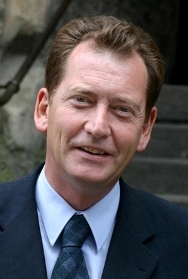

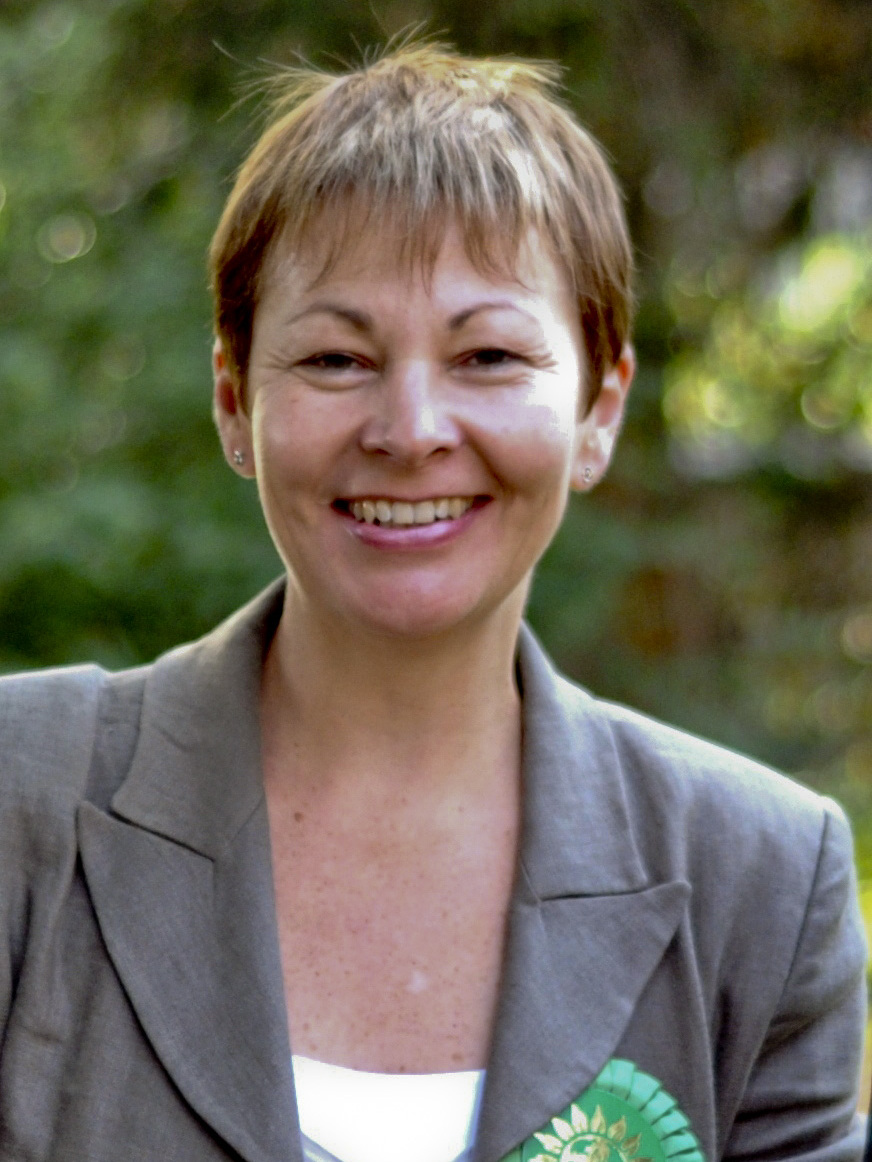

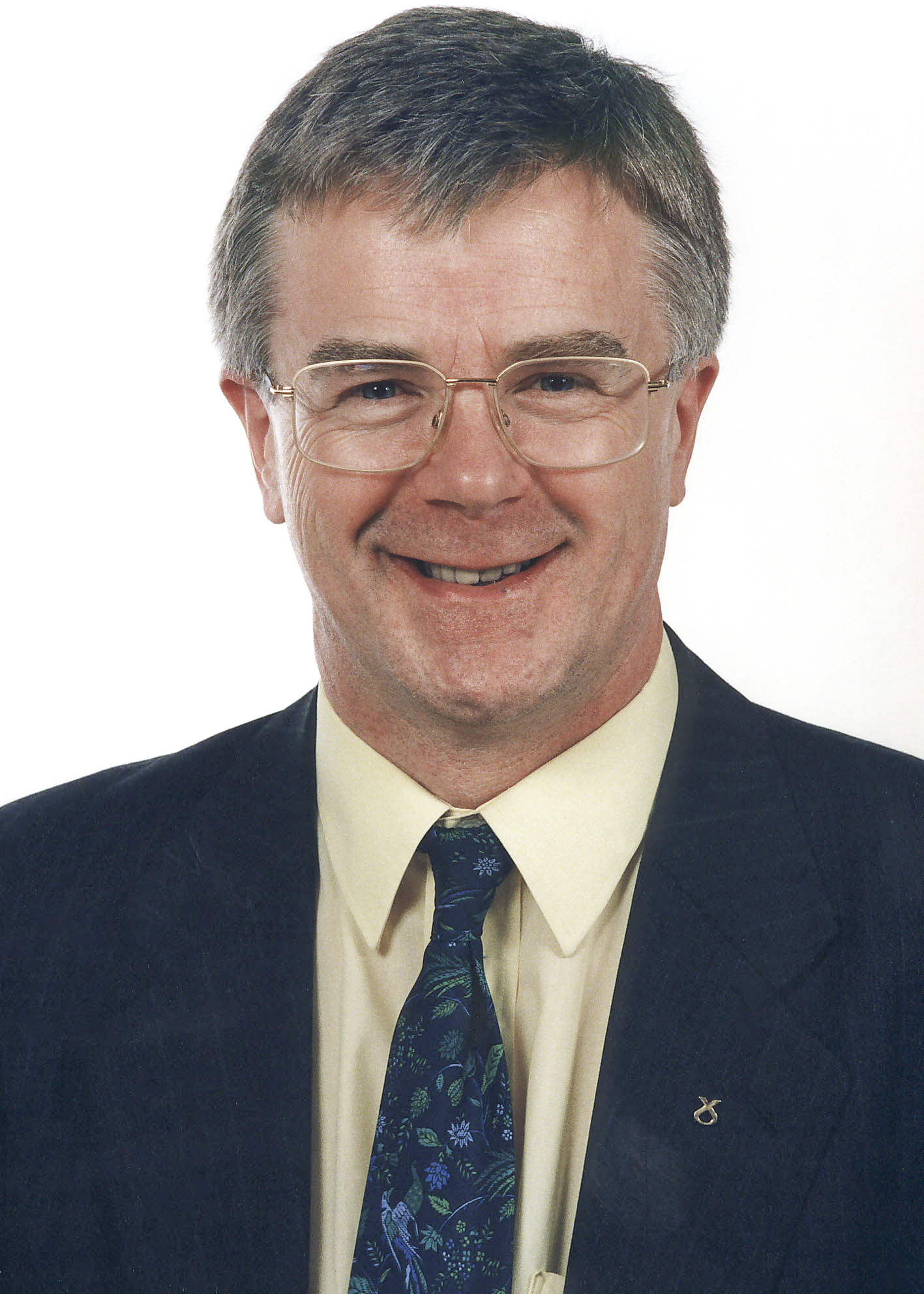
	First party	Second party	Third party
Leader	Jonathan Evans	Gary Titley	Roger Knapman
Party	Conservative	Labour	UKIP
Alliance	EPP	PES	IND/DEM
Leader since	14 December 2001	2002	5 October 2002
Leader's seat	Wales	North East England	Ran in South West England (won)
Last election	36 seats, 33.5%	29 seats, 26.3%	3 seats, 6.5%
Seats before	35 (Note: Notional 1999 results.)	25	2
Seats won	27	19	12
Seat change	▼8*	▼6*	▲10*
Popular vote	4,397,087	3,718,683	2,650,768
Percentage	25.9%	21.9%	15.6%
Swing	▼7.6%	▼4.4%	▲9.1%
	Fourth party	Fifth party	Sixth party
Leader	Graham Watson	Caroline Lucas (Note: Lucas was one of the party's Principal Speakers.)	Ian Hudghton (Note: Hudghton was the SNP's lead candidate.)
Party	Liberal Democrats	Green	SNP
Alliance	ALDE	Green	EFA
Leader since	January 2002	30 November 2003	June 1999
Leader's seat	South West England	South East England	Scotland
Last election	10 seats, 11.9%	2 seats, 5.3%	2 seats, 2.6%
Seats before	10	2	2
Seats won	12	2	2
Seat change	▲2*	Steady	Steady
Popular vote	2,452,327	948,588	231,505
Percentage	14.4%	5.6%	1.4%
Swing	▲2.6%	▲0.3%	▼1.2%
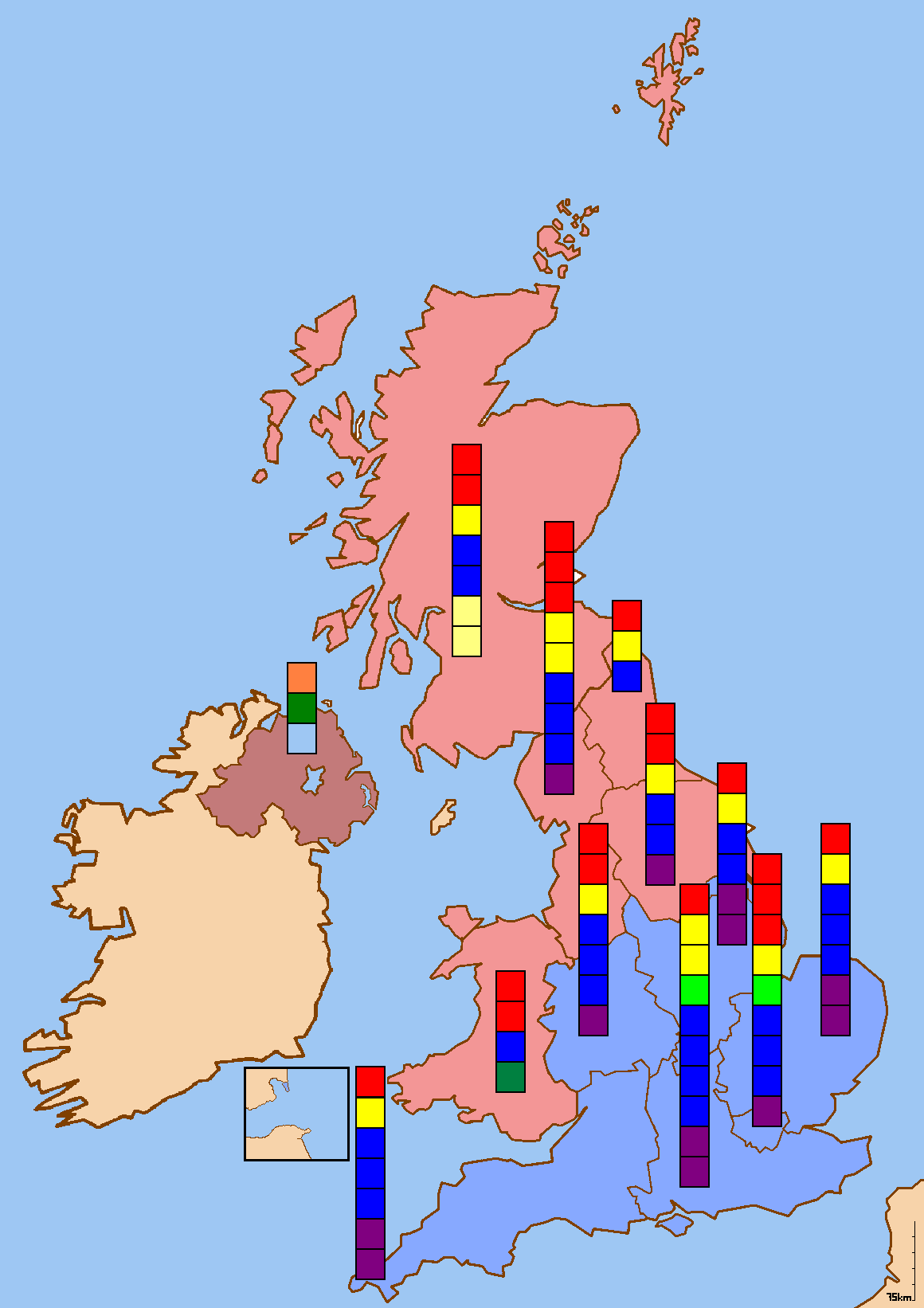
- Colours denote the winning party, as shown in the results tables *Seat change has been adjusted to allow for direct comparison with the results from the 1999 election.

The 2004 European Parliament election was the United Kingdom's part of the wider 2004 European Parliament election which was held between 10 and 13 June 2004 in the 25 member states of the European Union. The United Kingdom's part of this election was held on Thursday 10 June 2004. The election also coincided with the 2004 local elections and the London Assembly and mayoral elections. In total, 78 Members of the European Parliament were elected from the United Kingdom using proportional representation.

The Conservative Party and the Labour Party both polled poorly. The Conservatives experienced their second-lowest ever recorded vote share in a national election (even less than their 1832 nadir, although the party would do worse still in the 2014 and 2019 elections), and Labour their lowest since 1918. The UK Independence Party (UKIP) saw a large increase in support, increasing its number of MEPs from 3 to 12 and on popular vote pushed the Liberal Democrats, who themselves had increased their representation from 10 to 12 seats into fourth place. In Northern Ireland, Sinn Féin beat the SDLP in the polls and took its first Northern Ireland seat.

== Background ==
=== Electoral system ===
The United Kingdom elected 78 Members of the European Parliament using proportional representation. The United Kingdom was divided into twelve multi-member constituencies. The eleven of these regions which form Great Britain used a closed-list party list system method of proportional representation, calculated using the D'Hondt method. Northern Ireland used the Single Transferable Vote (STV). As a consequence of the 2004 enlargement of the European Union, the number of seats allocated to the United Kingdom was fewer than in 1999.

It was the first European election to be held in the United Kingdom using postal-only voting in four areas: the North East, North West, Yorkshire and the Humber, and East Midlands regions.

=== Regional seat allocations ===
A combination of the effects of the Treaty of Nice and the 2004 enlargement of the European Union meant that the number of seats allocated to the United Kingdom for the 2004 election was reduced from the 87 MEPs allocated for the 1999 election to 78 MEPs.

As a result of the successful challenge of Matthews v United Kingdom before the European Court of Human Rights in 1999 residents of Gibraltar, voted in the European Parliament election for the first time, as part of the South West England region.

Changes in regional seat allocations
Constituency	Representation in 1999	Representation in 2004	Net Gain/Loss
East Midlands	6	6	Steady
East of England	8	7	▼1
London	10	9	▼1
North East England	4	3	▼1
North West England	10	9	▼1
Northern Ireland	3	3	Steady
Scotland	8	7	▼1
South East England	11	10	▼1
South West England^{1}	7	7	Steady
Wales	5	4	▼1
West Midlands	8	7	▼1
Yorkshire and the Humber	7	6	▼1
Overall	87	78	▼9

^{1} Includes Gibraltar, the only British overseas territory which was part of the EU.

== Results ==
Partial map, showing most popular party by counting area in Great Britain only.

Turnout for all the regions was 38.2% on an electorate of 44,157,267 (43,084,598 in Great Britain and 1,072,669 in Northern Ireland). The Conservatives and Labour both polled poorly. The Conservatives, although getting a vote share 4.1% greater than Labour, experienced their lowest vote share in a national election since 1832. Labour's vote share was its lowest since 1918. Labour's decline in votes was regarded as being largely due to widespread public dissatisfaction about the Iraq War and (as with the Conservatives) the increased popularity of UK Independence Party (UKIP). UKIP saw a large increase in support, increasing its number of MEPs from 3 to 12, drawing level with the Liberal Democrats, who themselves had increased their representation from 10 to 12 seats. UKIP polled higher than the Liberal Democrats to push the latter into fourth place.

Turnout was lowest in Scotland, which did not hold local elections on the same day. In Scotland, Labour topped the poll, followed by the Scottish National Party (SNP). The Conservatives' share of the vote declined by 2 per cent, making it the region with the smallest swing against them.

Wales was the only region were Labour increased its share of the vote compared to 1999. The Conservatives managed to make gains pushing Plaid Cymru into third and whose share of the vote fell by 12 percentage points relative to 1999. Similarly UKIP narrowly beat the Liberal Democrats into fourth place. Wales was the region where the Green Party polled their lowest share of the vote.

=== United Kingdom ===
Party	Votes won	% of vote	Loss/Gain	Seats	Loss/Gain†	% of seats
Conservative	4,397,090	25.9	-7.6	27	-8	34.6
Labour	3,718,683	21.9	-4.4	19	-6	24.4
UKIP	2,650,768	15.6	+9.1	12	+10	15.4
Liberal Democrats	2,452,327	14.4	+2.6	12	+2	15.4
Green	948,588	5.6	+0.3	2	0	2.6
BNP	808,201	4.8	+3.8	0	0	0
Respect	252,216	1.5	New	0	0	0
SNP	231,505	1.4	-1.2	2	0	2.6
DUP	175,761	1.0	-0.8	1	0	1.3
Plaid Cymru	159,888	0.9	-0.8	1	0	1.3
Sinn Féin	144,541	0.9	-0.3	1	+1	1.3
English Democrat	130,056	0.8	New	0	0	0
Liberal	96,325	0.6	-0.3	0	0	0
Independent - Martin Bell	93,028	0.6	New	0	0	0
UUP	91,164	0.5	-0.6	1	0	1.3
SDLP	87,559	0.5	-1.3	0	-1	0
Green	79,695	0.5	-0.1	0	0	0
Scottish Socialist	61,356	0.4	New	0	0	0
CPA	56,771	0.3	New	0	0	0
Senior Citizens	42,861	0.3	New	0	0	0
Countryside	42,107	0.2	New	0	0	0
Independent - Herron	39,658	0.2	New	0	0	0
Independent - Gilliland	36,270	0.2	New	0	0	0
Pensioners	33,501	0.2	New	0	0	0
Christian Vote	21,056	0.1	New	0	0	0
ProLife Alliance	20,393	0.1	New	0	0	0
Forward Wales	17,280	0.1	New	0	0	0
Independent - Ellis	14,762	0.1	New	0	0	0
People's Party for Better Government	13,776	0.1	New	0	0	0
Peace	12,572	0.1	New	0	0	0
Socialist Environmental	9,172	0.1	New	0	0	0
Common Good	8,650	0.1	New	0	0	0
Independent - Neal	8,318	0.0	New	0	0	0
Scottish Wind Watch	7,255	0.0	New	0	0	0
Christian Democratic Party	6,821	0.0	New	0	0	0
Independent - Rhodes	5,671	0.0	New	0	0	0
Independent - Naisbitt	5,137	0.0	New	0	0	0
Green (NI)	4,810	0.0	New	0	0	0
Independent - Tait	3,624	0.0	New	0	0	0
Independent - Rogers	2,615	0.0	New	0	0	0
Independent - Shadmyraine	847	0.0	New	0	0	0
Total	16,443,397	—	—	78	—	—

All parties listed.

†Loss/gain figures for seats are losses/gains versus the 1999 notional result, as the number of MEPs overall fell.

=== Great Britain ===
Summary of the election results for Great Britain

Party	Votes won	% of vote	Loss/Gain	Seats	Loss/Gain†	% of seats
Conservative	4,397,090	26.7	-9.0	27	-8	36.0
Labour	3,718,683	22.6	-5.4	19	-6	25.3
UKIP	2,650,768	16.1	+9.2	12	+10	16.0
Liberal Democrats	2,452,327	14.9	+2.3	12	+2	16.0
Green	948,588	5.8	+0.1	2	0	2.7
BNP	808,201	4.9	+3.9	0	0	0
Respect	252,216	1.5	New	0	0	0
SNP	231,505	1.4	-1.3	2	0	2.7
Plaid Cymru	159,888	1.0	-0.9	1	0	1.3
English Democrat	130,056	0.8	New	0	0	0
Liberal	96,325	0.6	-0.3	0	0	0
Independent - Martin Bell	93,028	0.6	New	0	0	0
Green	79,695	0.5	-0.1	0	0	0
Scottish Socialist	61,356	0.4	New	0	0	0
CPA	56,771	0.3	New	0	0	0
Senior Citizens	42,861	0.3	New	0	0	0
Countryside	42,107	0.3	New	0	0	0
Independent - Herron	39,658	0.2	New	0	0	0
Pensioners	33,501	0.2	New	0	0	0
Christian Vote	21,056	0.1	New	0	0	0
ProLife Alliance	20,393	0.1	New	0	0	0
Forward Wales	17,280	0.1	New	0	0	0
Independent - Herron	14,762	0.1	New	0	0	0
People's Party for Better Government	13,776	0.1	New	0	0	0
Peace	12,572	0.1	New	0	0	0
Common Good	8,650	0.1	New	0	0	0
Independent - Neal	8,318	0.1	New	0	0	0
Scottish Wind Watch	7,255	0.0	New	0	0	0
Christian Democratic Party	6,821	0.0	New	0	0	0
Independent - Rhodes	5,671	0.0	New	0	0	0
Independent - Naisbitt	5,137	0.0	New	0	0	0
Independent - Tait	3,624	0.0	New	0	0	0
Independent - Rogers	2,615	0.0	New	0	0	0
Independent - Shadmyraine	847	0.0	New	0	0	0
Total	16,443,397	—	—	75	—	—

All parties listed.

†Loss/gain figures for seats are losses/gains versus the 1999 notional result, as the number of MEPs overall fell.

=== Gibraltar ===
Gibraltar participated in the United Kingdom's election for the first time in 2004 as part of the South West England constituency. Gibraltar is a British overseas territory (BOT) and therefore is under the jurisdiction and sovereignty of the United Kingdom but does not form part of it. Gibraltar was however part of the EU, the only BOT to be so included. Following however, the result of the successful challenge of Matthews v United Kingdom before the European Court of Human Rights in 1999 residents of Gibraltar were given the right to vote in the European Parliament elections. The British government decided not to give Gibraltar its own seat due to its small electorate of just over 20,000 which would have meant with just one seat Gibraltar would have been over-represented by about 30 times the average.

None of the main Gibraltar political parties contested the election, so voters chose from United Kingdom party lists. However, Lyana Armstrong-Emery of Gibraltar's Reform Party had a place on a joint list with the Green Party. In addition both the leader of the Conservative Party, Michael Howard, and his deputy, Michael Ancram, campaigned in Gibraltar.

Turnout in Gibraltar was 57.5%, higher than the 37.6% for the South West England electoral region as a whole. The Conservative Party polled over two-thirds of the Gibraltar vote, with no other party exceeding 10% support.

=== Northern Ireland ===
Turnout in Northern Ireland was 51.2%. Sinn Féin beat the SDLP in the polls and took its first Northern Ireland seat. Sinn Féin also won a seat in the corresponding elections in the Republic of Ireland. Sinn Féin and the DUP increased their shares of the vote relative to the 1999 European Parliament elections, while the shares for both the SDLP and the UUP fell. This was also the final election in which a Unionist candidate topped the poll in Northern Ireland. Jim Allister of the DUP and Bairbre de Brún of Sinn Féin were elected in the first round while Jim Nicholson of the UUP was elected in the third stage, after the votes of the other candidates were reallocated.

Summary of the election results for Northern Ireland

Party	Candidate(s)	Seats	Loss/Gain	First Preference Votes	
Party	Candidate(s)	Seats	Loss/Gain	Number	% of vote
DUP	Jim Allister	1	Steady	175,761	31.9
Sinn Féin	Bairbre de Brún	1	▲1	144,541	26.3
UUP	Jim Nicholson	1	Steady	91,164	16.6
SDLP	Martin Morgan	0	▼1	87,559	15.9
Independent	John Gilliland	0	Steady	36,270	6.6
Socialist Environmental	Eamonn McCann	0	Steady	9,172	1.6
Green (NI)	Lindsay Whitcroft	0	Steady	4,810	0.9
Total				549,277	
Turnout					51.2%

=== MEPs defeated ===
Labour

- David Bowe (Yorkshire and the Humber)
- Bill Miller (Scotland)
- Brian Simpson (North West England) - returned to the European Parliament in September 2006 and defended his seat in 2009.
- Mo O'Toole (North East England)
- Mark F. Watts (South East England)

Conservative

- Jacqueline Foster (North West England) - was reelected in the 2009 election.
- Alexander Macmillan (South West England)
- Roy Perry (South East England)
- Ian Twinn (London) - only took seat on 21 October 2003 after the ill-health resignation of Lord Bethell.

Plaid Cymru

- Eurig Wyn (Wales)

== Aftermath ==
Both Tony Blair and Michael Howard faced criticism for their results with then Secretary of State for Health John Reid calling the results "disappointing" for Labour and "disastrous" for the Conservatives.

Shortly after the election UKIP's Robert Kilroy-Silk, who was credited with raising the profile of the party during the election, was interviewed by Channel 4 television about leadership ambitions, Kilroy-Silk did not deny having ambitions to lead the party, but stressed that Roger Knapman would lead it into the next general election. However, the next day, on Breakfast with Frost, he criticised Knapman's leadership. After further disagreement with the leadership, Kilroy-Silk resigned the UKIP whip in the European Parliament on 27 October 2004. Initially, he remained a member, while seeking a bid for the party leadership. However, this was not successful and he resigned completely from UKIP on 20 January 2005, calling it a "joke". Two weeks later, he founded his own party, Veritas, taking a number of UKIP members, including both of the London Assembly members, with him.

UKIP formed a new European Parliament Group, Independence/Democracy which was co-chaired by Nigel Farage and Hanne Dahl.

== See also ==
- 2005 United Kingdom general election
- List of political parties in the United Kingdom
