= Tyne South and Wear (European Parliament constituency) =

Former European Parliament constituency

- European Parliament constituency
- Boundary within North East England (1979-1984)
- Member state: United Kingdom
- Created: 1979
- Dissolved: 1984
- MEPs: 1

Prior to its uniform adoption of proportional representation in 1999, the United Kingdom used first-past-the-post for the European elections in England, Scotland and Wales. The European Parliament constituencies used under that system were smaller than the later regional constituencies and only had one Member of the European Parliament each.

The constituency of Tyne South and Wear was one of them.

It consisted of the Westminster Parliament constituencies (on their 1974 boundaries) of Blaydon, Gateshead East, Gateshead West, Jarrow, South Shields, Sunderland North, Sunderland South, and Tynemouth.

== Member of the European Parliament ==
Elected	Name	Party
1979	Joyce Quin	Labour
1984	Constituency abolished	

== Results ==
European Parliament election, 1979: Tyne South and Wear
Party	Candidate	Votes	%	±%
Labour	Joyce Quin	73,936	49.2	
Conservative	J. Landau	67,475	44.9	
Liberal	Peter Freitag	8,958	5.9	
Majority		6,461	4.3	
Turnout		150,369	29.8	
Labour win (new seat)				
