= Matthews v United Kingdom =

1999 European Court of Human Rights case

Matthews v United Kingdom is a human rights case (18 February 1999) on the right to vote, under the European Convention on Human Rights.

Gibraltarians, although EU citizens under the British Treaty of Accession, were unable to vote in elections for the European Parliament. Gibraltar is bound by EU laws and has implemented EU legislation fully and promptly, but Gibraltarians and other EU nationals resident in Gibraltar had been denied the vote in elections to the European Parliament. The reason given was that the British Government had failed to make the necessary legal arrangements and declined to do so.

In 1998 Lord Bethell moved an amendment to the European Parliamentary Elections Bill in the House of Lords, to make a provision for the right to vote for residents of Gibraltar, but it was defeated by the Labour Government, supported by the Liberal Democrats.

The Gibraltar Self-Determination Group (SDGG) took the case to the European Court of Human Rights, and won a landmark decision.

The applicant, Denise Matthews, is a British citizen and resident of Gibraltar. In April 1994 she applied to be registered as a voter in the elections to the European Parliament. She was told that under the terms of the EC Act on Direct Elections of 1976 Gibraltar was not included in the franchise for those elections.

The applicant claimed that the absence of elections in Gibraltar to the European Parliament was in violation of her right to participate in elections to choose the legislature under Article 3 of Protocol No. 1. She also alleged a violation of Article 14 on the ground that she was entitled to vote in European Parliament elections anywhere in the European Union where she lived except in Gibraltar. It was common ground that Article 3 of Protocol No. 1 applied in Gibraltar.

As a consequence of this decision in 1999 and after consultation by the Electoral Commission, Gibraltar was included in the South West England constituency for the European Parliament election in 2004.

Spain took a complaint about Gibraltar participating in EU elections to the European Court of Justice, the European Union's high court, but this was unsuccessful.

== See also ==
- Law of Gibraltar
