= Stephen Hughes (politician) =

British politician

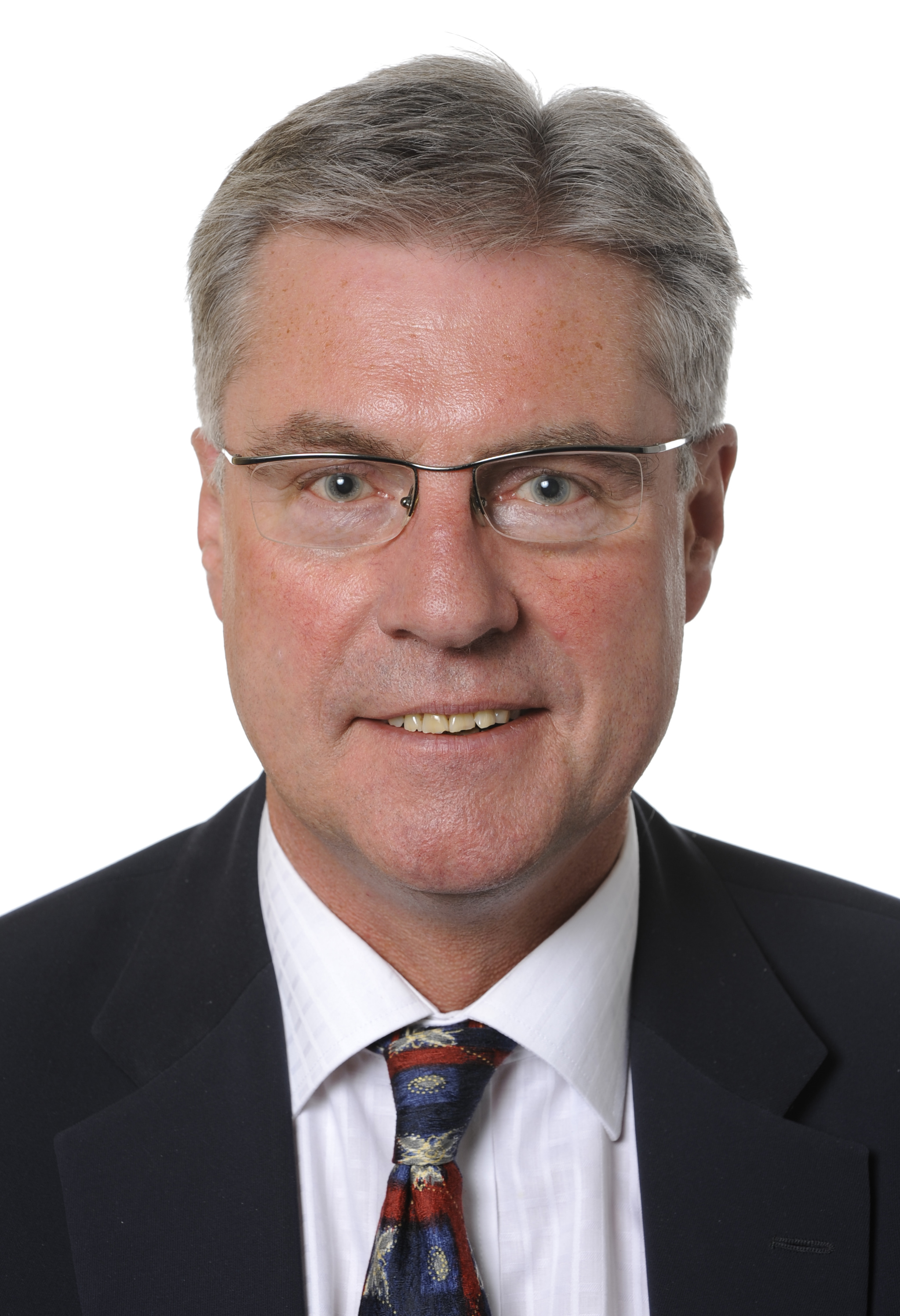

Member of the European Parliament for North East England
- In office 10 June 1999 – 2 July 2014
- Preceded by: Constituency created
- Succeeded by: Judith Kirton-Darling

Member of the European Parliament for Durham
- In office 14 June 1984 – 10 June 1999
- Preceded by: Roland Boyes
- Succeeded by: Constituency dissolved

Personal details
- Born: 19 August 1952 (age 73) Sunderland, County Durham
- Party: Labour

Stephen Skipsey Hughes (born 19 August 1952, in Sunderland, County Durham) is a British Labour Party politician who served as a Member of the European Parliament (MEP) from 1984 to 2014.

Hughes attended St Bede's School in Lanchester, County Durham, and then Newcastle Polytechnic. He became a local government officer.

Representing the Durham European Parliament constituency between 1984 and 1999, Hughes was elected to its successor constituency, North East England in 1999 and re-elected in 2004 and 2009. He stood down at the 2014 election. In 1994 he appeared in the Guinness Book of World Records for the biggest majority in an English election.

Hughes was deputy leader of the European Parliamentary Labour Party from 1989 until 1991, and was also the Social Group spokesperson on health and safety and on the working environment. Between 1994 and 1999 he was Chair of the Parliament's Committee on Employment and Social Affairs.

In 2009 the Labour list of candidates, which he led, took 25% of the vote, the highest in the region, and the highest share of the vote for Labour in the UK in that election.

== Personal life ==
He is the father of five children. He plays saxophone in a blues band called the Vast Majorities.
