= Fiona Hall (politician) =

British politician

Fiona Hall MBE
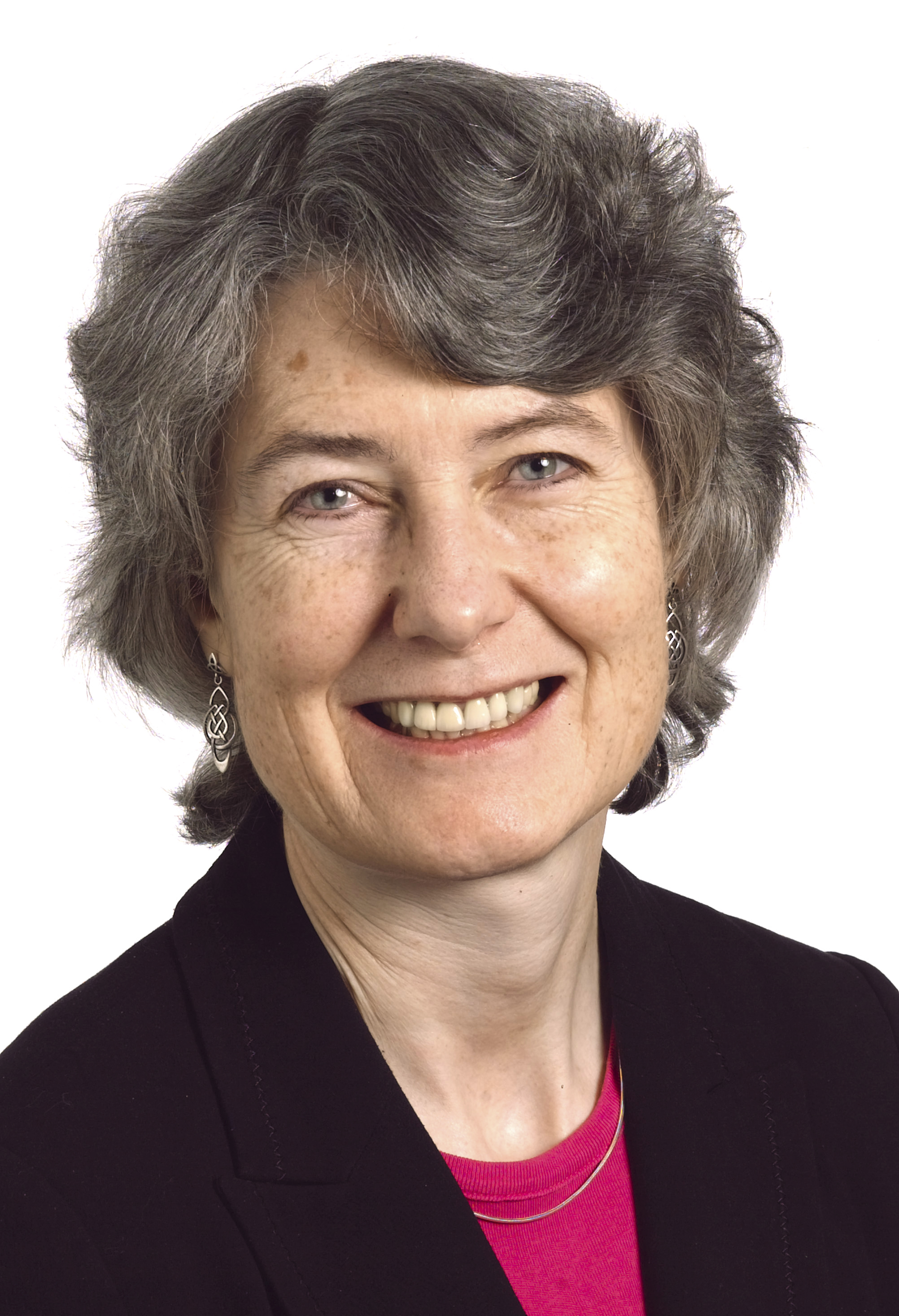
- Official portrait, 2012

Leader of the UK Liberal Democrats in the European Parliament
- In office 21 July 2009 – 2 July 2014
- Leader: Nick Clegg
- Preceded by: Diana Wallis
- Succeeded by: Catherine Bearder

Member of the European Parliament for North East England
- In office 10 June 2004 – 2 July 2014
- Preceded by: Gordon Adam
- Succeeded by: Paul Brannen

Personal details
- Born: 15 July 1955 (age 71) Swinton, Lancashire, England
- Party: Liberal Democrat
- Children: 2 daughters
- Education: St Hugh's College, Oxford

Fiona Jane Hall MBE (née Cutts; born 15 July 1955 in Swinton, Lancashire) is a British politician who was a Member of the European Parliament (MEP) for North East England. She served as leader of the Liberal Democrats in the European Parliament from 2009 to 2014. She was elected to the European Parliament in 2004, and re-elected in 2009, coming in third behind Labour and Conservative candidates with 17% of the vote, the highest of any UK Liberal Democrat candidate.

Hall attended Worsley Wardley Grammar School and Eccles College. She went on to study at St Hugh's College, Oxford, and graduated with a degree in Modern languages. She worked part-time as a teacher after moving to Northumberland, where she campaigned against nuclear power in the early 1990s.

Hall began working as a political officer for the Liberal Democrats in 1997 and was a parliamentary researcher two years later. Hall was an Organization for Security and Co-operation in Europe polling station supervisor in Kosovo in 2001 following the 1999 NATO bombing of Yugoslavia.

Hall led the European Union's observer mission in Togo during the October 2007 Togolese parliamentary election. She has been vice-president of the European Forum for Renewable Energy Sources since 2008, and is a member of the group MEPs Against Cancer.

Hall was appointed a Member of the Order of the British Empire (MBE) in the 2013 New Year Honours List for public and political service.
