= Alliance for Democracy (UK) =

Organization

- Formation: 2010
- Type: Political organisation
- Purpose: Electoral alliance
- Headquarters: London
- Location: Alliance For Democracy England, PO Box 65106, London, England, SW1P 9PN
- Region served: United Kingdom
- Official language: English
- Leader: Vacant
- Remarks: Ideology: English nationalism Christian right Conservatism; Euroscepticism

The Alliance for Democracy was an electoral coalition of two British political parties, the English Democrats and the Jury Team. The Christian Party, and Veritas were associates.

Its priorities were expanding the use of referendums, promoting non-career politicians, and cleaning up government and the processes surrounding the selection of the prime minister. The Alliance was launched on 10 February 2010.

== Background ==
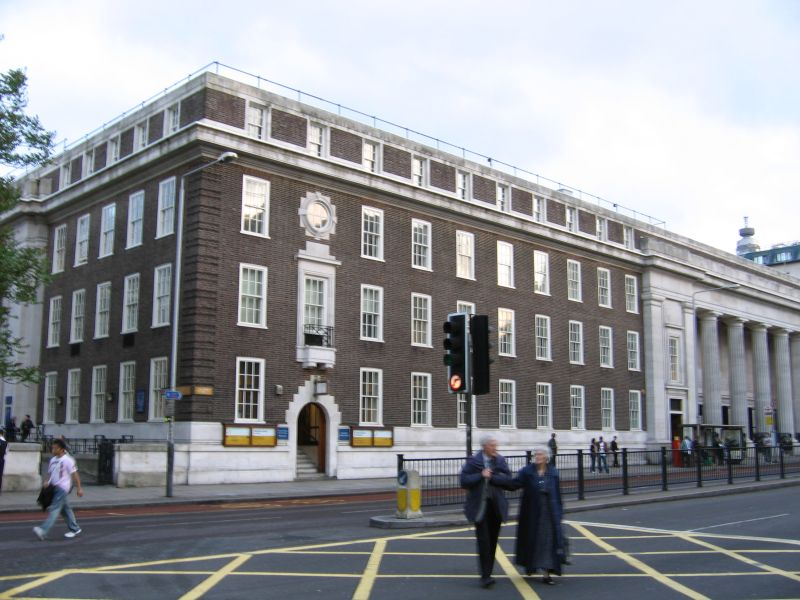
The Friends Meeting House in Euston, the location of early meetings.

Following the 2004 European Union elections, representatives of four parties who stood in those elections, Robin Tilbrook and Steve Uncles from the English Democrats, Steve Radford from the Liberal Party, Grahame Leon-Smith from the Senior Citizens Party and Richard Malbon of the Countryside Party met to consider working together in the 2005 General Election. They met twice at the Friends House in Euston Road, London and agreed a common set of principles under which to contend the election, intending to stand enough candidates to obtain a collective party political broadcast. However, the National Executive of the Liberal Party opposed the plan due to some of the policies of the Countryside Party, although that party did not stand at the election.

Although there was no formal agreement, candidates were co-ordinated so that with the exception of one constituency, the English Democrats, Liberal Party and Senior Citizens Party did not stand against each other.

== Foundation ==
Following the 2009 European elections, the English Democrats, Jury Team, and Popular Alliance held a similar meeting to discuss working together at the 2010 General Election. The Popular Alliance involved the Christian Party, United Kingdom First Party, and Veritas, with Alan Wood of the United Kingdom Independence Party attending one meeting. The English Democrats invited the UK Libertarian Party to join the discussions, but they declined to participate. The first meeting of the Alliance was on 7 November 2009, again at the Friends House in Euston.

== 2010 general election ==
Steve Uncles and Elaine Cheeseman from the English Democrats, George Hargreaves from the Christian Party, Paul Judge from the Jury Team, Robin Page from the United Kingdom First Party, Therese Muchewicz from Veritas and Brian Buxton from the Popular Alliance discussed their plans for the 2010 general election, meeting five times in Euston and Vauxhall and agreed common principles and not to stand against each other.

The Alliance was led by the English Democrats and Jury Team. The Christian Party and Veritas had associate status, while United Kingdom First and the Popular Alliance withdrew as they were unlikely to field candidates. Following the launch of the Alliance on 15 February 2010, other parties were invited to join the Alliance, aiming to field 350 candidates. In the event about half this many stood.

Opponents have pointed to the diversity of viewpoints as a potential pitfall for the Alliance, noting in particular that while the Christian Party promises to "uphold marriage between one man and one woman for life", leader Sir Paul was married to his third wife after two divorces.

English Democrats fielded 106 candidates in the General Election. These averaged 1.3% of the vote and one candidate saved his deposit. Jury Team and Veritas failed to field any candidates at all. The Christian Party stood against the English Democrats in 13 seats. Their candidates achieved less than 1% of the vote on average.

It was confirmed that the Alliance for Democracy has now been abandoned. All queries about the Alliance have now been requested to be sent to the English Democrats alone.

=== Manifesto ===
In 2010, the Alliance released a manifesto that the constituent parties agreed to use as a joint platform with these highlights:

- Negotiating the withdrawal of the UK from the European Union in a way that maintains the closest possible trading links.
- Requiring referendums to be held on a particular issue if there is a petition with signatures from 5% of the electorate.
- Limiting the amount the government can borrow each year to no more than 10% of its total expenditure.[...]
- Increasing to 10 years (from the current 3 or 5) the minimum time that immigrants must live in the UK before getting UK Citizenship,[...]
- Limiting the number of British troops sent to Afghanistan to the average number sent by other NATO countries (relative to their population).
- Giving courts the ability to sentence violent criminals to “army style” punishment and training courses.
- Making private medical insurance a requirement for all non-EU citizens obtaining visas for more than three months unless they are working and paying social security.
- Allowing state schools the option of becoming independent state funded charities outside the control of the local education authority if a majority of parents agree (to be legislated separately in each of the four nations of the UK).
- Limiting the total amount that an able-bodied claimant with no children can receive in tax credits and social security, including housing benefit, to 80% of the after tax minimum wage (currently to £157.67 per week for a person over 21).
- Changing the voting system for election to the House of Commons to direct proportional representation.
- Setting up an English Parliament to decide matters that relate solely to England.

== See also ==
=== Constituent parties ===
- Christian Party
- English Democrats
- Jury Team
- Popular Alliance
- UK First Party
- Veritas
