= Christian Party election results =

The Christian Party, which includes the Scottish Christian Party and the Welsh Christian Party, is a minor political party in Great Britain.

== United Kingdom Parliament ==
=== House of Commons ===
House of Commons of the United Kingdom
Election year	# of total votes	% of overall vote	# of seats won	Rank
2005	4,004 ▲	0.0%▲	0	26
2010	18,622 ▲	0.1% ▲	0	17
2015	3,205 ▼	0.0% ▼	0	27
2017	1,720 ▼	0.0% ▼	0	23
2019	705 ▼	0.0% ▼	0	23
2024	806 ▲	0.0% ▲	0	TBD

=== By-elections, 2005–10 ===
Date of election	Constituency	Candidate	Votes	%
6 January 2006	Dunfermline & West Fife	George Hargreaves	411	1.2
19 July 2007	Sedgefield	Tim Grainger	177	0.6
19 July 2007	Ealing, Southall	Yaqub Masih	280	0.8
10 July 2008	Haltemprice & Howden	George Hargreaves	76	0.3

=== 2010 general election ===
The party fielded 71 candidates who polled 18,622 votes. In the seats it contested, the party received an average of 0.60% of the votes, losing all deposits at a cost of £35,500.

Constituency	Candidate	Votes	%
Aberconwy	Ms E L Wynne-Jones	137	0.5
Aldershot	Ms J Brimicombe	231	0.5
Aldridge-Brownhills	Ms S Gray	394	1.0
Barking	George Hargreaves	482	1.1
Bath	S P Hewett	250	0.5
Birmingham, Edgbaston	C H Fernando	127	0.3
Birmingham, Erdington	T J Gray	217	0.6
Birmingham, Perry Barr	Ms D Hey-Smith	507	1.2
Birmingham, Selly Oak	S L Leeds	159	0.3
Blackley & Broughton	S Zaman	161	0.5
Brecon & Radnorshire	J D Green	222	0.6
Brent, Central	E A Williams	488	1.1
Brentford & Isleworth	A J Bhatti	210	0.4
Buckingham	D P R Hews	369	0.8
Cardiff, North	D L Thomson	300	0.6
Cardiff, South & Penarth	C S Bate	285	0.6
Chatham & Aylesford	M I Smith	109	0.3
Chippenham	R G Sexton	118	0.2
Clwyd, West	D P Griffiths	239	0.6
Croydon, Central	J K N Gitau	264	0.5
Croydon, North	N L Williams	586	1.1
Dagenham & Rainham	P D Watson	305	0.7
Ealing, Central & Acton	S Fernandes	295	0.6
Ealing, North	P Ljubisic	415	0.9
Ealing, Southall	M Anil	503	1.2
Edmonton	C Morrison	350	0.9
Enfield, North	A Williams	161	0.4
Filton & Bradley Stoke	R M Johnson	199	0.4
Gateshead	D Walton	131	0.4
Greenwich & Woolwich	E A Adeleye	443	1.1
Hackney, North & Stoke Newington	M Hargreaves	299	0.6
Hackney, South & Shoreditch	J Williams	434	1.0
Harlow	O Adeeko	101	0.2
Hayes & Harlington	A Shahzad	83	0.2
Hornchurch & Upminster	J A Olukotun	281	0.5
Horsham	S Lyon	469	0.8
Inverness, Nairn, Badenoch & Strathspey	D M Boyd	835	1.8
Ipswich	K Christofi	149	0.3
Leigh	R G Hessell	137	0.3
Leyton & Wanstead	S K Bhatti	342	0.9
Maidstone & The Weald	H A Simmonds	131	0.3
Manchester, Gorton	P Harrison	254	0.7
Northampton, North	T S D Webb	98	0.2
Norwich, North	A M Holland	118	0.3
Nottingham, East	P A Sardar	125	0.4
Oldham, East & Saddleworth	G Nazir	212	0.5
Pendle	R E Masih	141	0.3
Pontypridd	D W E Watson	365	1.0
Preston	G Ambroze	272	0.8
Redditch	S Beverley	101	0.2
Ruislip, Northwood & Pinner	R Akhtar	198	0.4
Sheffield, Hallam	R Green	250	0.5
Slough	S Chaudhary	495	1.0
Stockton, South	E A Strike	302	0.6
Streatham	G W Macharia	237	0.5
Stretford & Urmston	S A Jacob	178	0.4
Swindon, South	A J Kirk	176	0.4
Tamworth	C A Detheridge	235	0.5
Thurrock	A I Araba	266	0.6
Tooting	S H Paul	171	0.3
Tottenham	A Kadara	262	0.6
Vale of Glamorgan	J Harrold	236	0.5
Vauxhall	L J Martin	200	0.5
Walsall, North	B Shakir	144	0.4
Walsall, South	G Khan	482	1.2
Walthamstow	A J Mall	248	0.6
Wansbeck	M Flynn	142	0.4
Westminster, North	G Fajardo	98	0.3
Wimbledon	D L Martin	235	0.5
Worthing, West	S Dearsley	300	0.6
Ynys Mon	D Owen	163	0.5

=== By-elections, 2010–15 ===
Date of election	Constituency	Candidate	Votes	%
19 July 2007	Eastleigh	Kevin Milburn	163	0.4

=== 2015 general election ===
The party fielded 9 candidates who between them polled 3,205 votes, losing eight deposits at a cost of £4,000.

Constituency	Candidate	Votes	%
Birmingham, Edgbaston	Gabriel Ukandu	163	0.4
Cardiff, N	Jeff Green	331	0.6
Halifax	Trevor Bendrien	312	0.7
Inverness, Nairn, Badenoch & Strathspey	Donald Boyd	422	0.7
Na h-Eileanan an Iar (Western Isles)	John Cormack	1,045	6.6
Old Bexley & Sidcup	Laurence Williams^{*}	245	0.5
Surrey Heath	Juliana Brimicombe	361	0.7
Twickenham	Dominic Stockford	174	0.3
Westminster North	Gabriela Fajardo	152	0.4

^{*} Williams has also contested Erith and Thamesmead for the English Democrats in the 2010 general election, the London region for the Christian Peoples Alliance in the 2014 European elections, in Sidcup for the Liberal Party in the 2018 local election and Vale of Glamorgan for Gwlad Gwlad in the 2019 general election.

=== 2017 general election ===
Constituency	Candidate	Votes	%
Inverness, Nairn, Badenoch & Strathspey	Donald Boyd	612	1.2
Na h-Eileanan an Iar (Western Isles)	John Cormack	1,108	7.5

=== 2019 general election ===
Constituency	Candidate	Votes	%
Brecon and Radnorshire	Jeff Green	245	0.6
Ross, Skye and Lochaber	Donald Boyd	460	1.2

=== 2024 general election ===
Constituency	Candidate	Votes	%
Glasgow West	John Cormack	310	0.8
Na h-Eileanan an Iar	Donald Boyd	496	3.7

== Scottish Parliament ==
=== 2007 Scottish Parliament election ===
The election was on 3 May 2007.
Constituencies
The party received 4,616 across the 7 constituencies it contested.

Constituency	Candidate	Votes	%
Glasgow, Baillieston	George Hargreaves	588	3.4
Glasgow, Kelvin	Isobel MacLeod	456	1.9
Glasgow Rutherglen	Tom Greig	548	2.3
Glasgow, Shettleston	Bob Graham	406	2.7
Glasgow, Springburn	David Johnston	484	1.0
Motherwell and Wishaw	Tom Selfridge	1,491	5.7
Strathkelvin and Bearsden	Bob Handyside	613	1.7

Additional Member System – Regional

Region	Votes	%	Results	Notes
Glasgow	2,991	1.4	None elected	Multi-member region; party list

=== 2011 Scottish Parliament election ===
The election was on 5 May 2011.
Additional Member System – Regional

Region	Votes	%	Results	Notes
Glasgow	1,501	0.7	None elected	Multi-member region; party list

=== 2016 Scottish Parliament election ===
The election was on 5 May 2016.

==== Constituency ====
Region	Candidates	Votes	%	Result
Na h-Eileanan an Iar	John Cormack	1,162	8.8	Not elected

==== Regional ====
Region	Candidates	Votes	%	Results	Notes
Highlands and Islands	Donald Boyd, Andrew Shearer, Isobel MacLeod, John Lister	3,407	1.7	None elected	Multi-member region; party list
North East Scotland	Tom Morrow, Norman Ogston	2,068	0.7	None elected	Multi-member region; party list

== National Assembly for Wales ==
=== 2007 National Assembly for Wales election ===
The election was held on 3 May 2007. The party received 8,693 votes (0.9%) in the regional additional member polls, but did not contest individual constituencies.

Region	Candidates	Votes	%	Results	Notes
Mid and West Wales	A Bridgman, M Williams, J Morgan, M Davies, M Wiltshire	1,493	0.7	None elected	Multi-member region; party list
North Wales	Mrs E M L Griffiths, Rev. Heather Butler, M MacLeod, J Davies	1,300	0.7	None elected	Multi-member region; party list
South Wales Central	W Johannsen, D Thomson, D Williams, J Storey	757	0.4	None elected	Multi-member region; party list
South Wales East	J Green, G Waggett, P Watkins, R Patching	2,498	1.3	None elected	Multi-member region; party list
South Wales West	D Griffiths, A Kelly, Mrs K Bridgman, T Price, TMrs T Jenkins	1,685	1.0	None elected	Multi-member region; party list

=== 2011 National Assembly for Wales election ===
The election was held on 5 May 2011. The party ran in the regional additional member polls, but did not contest individual constituencies.

Region	Candidates	Votes	%	Results	Notes
Mid and West Wales	Jeff Green, Adam Bridgman, Martin Wiltshire, Sue Green	1,630	0.8	None elected	Multi-member region; party list
North Wales	Ralph Kinch, Louise Wynne-Jones, Lindsay Griffiths, Neil Bastow	1,401	0.7	None elected	Multi-member region; party list
South Wales Central	John Harrold, Clive Bate, Donald Watson, Derek Thomson	1,873	0.9	None elected	Multi-member region; party list
South Wales East	Dave Owen, Steve McCreery, Raphael Martin, Tracey Martin	2,441	1.3	None elected	Multi-member region; party list
South Wales West	David Griffiths, Dick Van Steenis, Maggie Harrold, Ray Bridgman	1,602	1.0	None elected	Multi-member region; party list

=== 2016 National Assembly for Wales election ===
The election was held on 5 May 2016. The party ran in the regional additional member polls, but did not contest individual constituencies.

Region	Candidates	Votes	%	Results	Notes
Mid and West Wales	Jeff Green, Sue Green, Louise Jones, Barbara Hill	1,103	0.5	None elected	Multi-member region; party list

=== 2021 Senedd election ===
The election was held on 6 May 2021. The party ran in the regional additional member polls, but did not contest individual constituencies.

Region	Candidates	Votes	%	Results	Notes
Mid and West Wales	Jeff Green, Sue Green, Louise Jones, Barbara Hill	1,366	0.6	None elected	Multi-member region; party list

=== 2026 Senedd election ===
Constituency	Candidates	Votes	%	Results	Notes
Brycheiniog Tawe Nedd	Jeff Green, Sue Green	456	0.6	None elected	Multi-member region; party list

== European Parliament elections ==
=== 2009 European Parliament election in the United Kingdom ===
The European Parliament election was held in the UK on 4 June 2009.

Constituency	Candidates	Votes	%	Results	Notes
London	George Hargreaves, Susan May, Paula Warren, Stephen Hammond, Mary Boyle, Suzanne; Fernandez, Peter Ljubisic, David Williams	51,336	2.9	None elected	Multi-member constituencies; party list
