= UKF =

UKF may refer to:

- Unscented Kalman filter, a special case of an algorithm to handle measurements containing noise and other inaccuracies
- UK funky, a genre of electronic dance music from the United Kingdom
- UKF Music, an electronic music brand based in the United Kingdom
- United Kingdom First, a small short-lived populist, Eurosceptic British political party
- Univerzita Konštantína Filozofa, a university in Nitra, Slovakia
