= 2012 South Cambridgeshire District Council election =

2012 UK local government election

South Cambridgeshire District Council election, 2012

Results by ward of the 2012 local election in South Cambridgeshire

Overall composition of the council following the 2012 election

Elections to South Cambridgeshire District Council took place on Thursday 3 May 2012, as part of the 2012 United Kingdom local elections. Nineteen seats, making up one third of South Cambridgeshire District Council, were up for election. Seats up for election in 2012 were last contested at the 2008 election. The Conservative Party retained their majority on the council.

== Summary ==
At this election, Conservatives were defending 10 seats while Liberal Democrats and Independents were defending 4 seats each. Labour were defending their only seat on the council in Bassingbourn. Of the councillors elected in 2008, all were running for re-election except for incumbent Liberal Democrat Liz Heazell in Haslingfield and the Eversdens, and independent Mike Mason in Histon and Impington. The incumbent councillor in Longstanton, Alex Riley, was elected as an independent in 2008, but joined the Conservatives in 2011.

Only two seats changed hands at this election. In Haslingfield and the Eversdens, journalist Robin Page defeated the Liberal Democrat candidate by two votes, while in Linton the Conservatives defeated the incumbent Liberal Democrats by just one vote.

== Results ==
South Cambridgeshire District Council election, 2012
| Party | Seats | | | | Popular vote | |
| Party | Won | Not up | Total | ± | Votes | % |
|---|---|---|---|---|---|---|
| Conservative | 11 | 22 | 33 | +1 | 11,009 | 41.5 |
| Liberal Democrats | 2 | 14 | 16 | −2 | 5,252 | 19.8 |
| Independent | 5 | 2 | 7 | +1 | 3,795 | 14.3 |
| Labour | 1 | 0 | 1 | 0 | 5,809 | 21.9 |
| Green | 0 | 0 | 0 | 0 | 487 | 1.8 |
| UKIP | 0 | 0 | 0 | 0 | 151 | 0.6 |
| Total | 19 | 38 | 57 | – | 26,503 | – |
| Turnout | | | | | | 34.9 |

== Results by ward ==
Bassingbourn Ward
| Party | Candidate | Votes | % | ±% |
|---|---|---|---|---|
| Labour | Nigel Nielsen Cathcart | 743 | 58.1 | +18.5 |
| Conservative | Peter James Robinson | 371 | 28.9 | −1.7 |
| Green | Simon Saggers | 132 | 10.3 | −2.6 |
| Liberal Democrats | Mark Holmes | 34 | 2.7 | N/A |
| Majority | | 372 | 29.2 | |
| Turnout | | 1,280 | 35.4 | |
| Labour hold | | Swing | | |

Bourn Ward
| Party | Candidate | Votes | % | ±% |
|---|---|---|---|---|
| Conservative | Mervyn Loynes | 779 | 46.5 | −2.9 |
| Labour | Gavin Clayton | 666 | 39.7 | +30.7 |
| Liberal Democrats | Peter Robert Fane | 232 | 13.8 | −27.8 |
| Majority | | 113 | 6.8 | |
| Turnout | | 1,677 | 24.8 | |
| Conservative hold | | Swing | | |

Cottenham Ward
| Party | Candidate | Votes | % | ±% |
|---|---|---|---|---|
| Conservative | Simon Mark Edwards | 1,089 | 45.9 | −11.7 |
| Labour | Andrew Papworth | 891 | 37.6 | +29.9 |
| Liberal Democrats | Richard William Gymer | 239 | 10.1 | −16.7 |
| UKIP | Michael Eric Heaver | 151 | 6.4 | N/A |
| Majority | | 198 | 8.3 | |
| Turnout | | 2,370 | 38.7 | |
| Conservative hold | | Swing | | |

Gamlingay Ward
| Party | Candidate | Votes | % | ±% |
|---|---|---|---|---|
| Liberal Democrats | Sebastian Kindersley | 667 | 58.5 | −5.9 |
| Conservative | Heather Brewer | 346 | 30.3 | −5.3 |
| Labour | Norman Alexander Crowther | 128 | 11.2 | N/A |
| Majority | | 321 | 28.2 | |
| Turnout | | 1,141 | 29.8 | |
| Liberal Democrats hold | | Swing | | |

Girton Ward
| Party | Candidate | Votes | % | ±% |
|---|---|---|---|---|
| Independent | Douglas Raymond de Lacey | 718 | 52.8 | +5.4 |
| Conservative | Alastair John Simpson | 428 | 31.5 | −5.9 |
| Labour | Tom Moule | 160 | 11.8 | +4.9 |
| Liberal Democrats | Petra Pellew | 55 | 4.0 | N/A |
| Majority | | 290 | 21.3 | |
| Turnout | | 1,361 | 39.8 | |
| Independent hold | | Swing | | |

Harston and Hauxton Ward
| Party | Candidate | Votes | % | ±% |
|---|---|---|---|---|
| Liberal Democrats | Janet Elizabeth Lockwood | 415 | 53.1 | −6.4 |
| Conservative | Gina Kay Youens | 283 | 36.2 | +2.8 |
| Labour | David John Taylor | 83 | 10.6 | N/A |
| Majority | | 132 | 16.9 | |
| Turnout | | 781 | 41.1 | |
| Liberal Democrats hold | | Swing | | |

Haslingfield and the Eversdens Ward
| Party | Candidate | Votes | % | ±% |
|---|---|---|---|---|
| Independent | Robin Page | 516 | 43.8 | +5.8 |
| Liberal Democrats | Rebecca Jane Ridley | 514 | 43.7 | −4.9 |
| Conservative | Thomas Benjamin Frearson | 95 | 8.1 | −5.3 |
| Labour | Helen Mary Haugh | 52 | 4.4 | N/A |
| Majority | | 2 | 0.1 | |
| Turnout | | 1,177 | 56.1 | |
| Independent gain from Liberal Democrats | | Swing | | |

Histon and Impington Ward
| Party | Candidate | Votes | % | ±% |
|---|---|---|---|---|
| Independent | Neil Sinnett Davies | 1287 | 46.5 | N/A |
| Liberal Democrats | Yemi Macaulay | 568 | 20.5 | −12.9 |
| Labour | Huw Jones | 473 | 17.1 | +12.3 |
| Conservative | Steven James Mastin | 438 | 15.8 | −7.7 |
| Majority | | 719 | 26.0 | |
| Turnout | | 2,766 | 36.9 | |
| Independent hold | | Swing | | |

Linton Ward
| Party | Candidate | Votes | % | ±% |
|---|---|---|---|---|
| Conservative | Roger Keith Hickford | 640 | 41.5 | +0.2 |
| Liberal Democrats | John Dennis Batchelor | 639 | 41.4 | −16.9 |
| Labour | Tom Purser | 264 | 17.11 | N/A |
| Majority | | 1 | 0.1 | |
| Turnout | | 1,543 | 42.1 | |
| Conservative gain from Liberal Democrats | | Swing | | |

Longstanton Ward
| Party | Candidate | Votes | % | ±% |
|---|---|---|---|---|
| Conservative | Alex Riley | 484 | 62.7 | +7.8 |
| Independent | Mick Yarrow | 190 | 24.6 | N/A |
| Labour | Janet Shepherd | 62 | 8.0 | N/A |
| Liberal Democrats | Jeremy Craig Taylor | 35 | 4.5 | N/A |
| Majority | | 294 | 38.1 | |
| Turnout | | 771 | 38.1 | |
| Conservative hold | | Swing | | |

Melbourn Ward
| Party | Candidate | Votes | % | ±% |
|---|---|---|---|---|
| Conservative | Val Barrett | 786 | 55.6 | +0.1 |
| Liberal Democrats | Margaret Hunter | 320 | 22.7 | −5.5 |
| Labour | Peter Andrew Vincent Sarris | 307 | 21.7 | +16.1 |
| Majority | | 466 | 32.9 | |
| Turnout | | 1,413 | 32.4 | |
| Conservative hold | | Swing | | |

Papworth and Elsworth Ward
| Party | Candidate | Votes | % | ±% |
|---|---|---|---|---|
| Conservative | Mark Phillip Howell | 840 | 68.6 | N/A |
| Labour | John Samuel Shepherd | 244 | 19.9 | N/A |
| Liberal Democrats | Joyce Elizabeth Leslie Baird | 140 | 11.4 | N/A |
| Majority | | 596 | 48.7 | |
| Turnout | | 1,224 | 33.1 | |
| Conservative hold | | Swing | | |

Sawston Ward
| Party | Candidate | Votes | % | ±% |
|---|---|---|---|---|
| Independent | Sally Ann Hatton | 535 | 37.1 | −14.2 |
| Conservative | Lucy Alice Sales | 505 | 35.1 | −13.7 |
| Labour | Martin Higgins | 335 | 23.3 | N/A |
| Liberal Democrats | Chika Akinwale | 66 | 4.6 | N/A |
| Majority | | 30 | 2.0 | |
| Turnout | | 1,441 | 26.1 | |
| Independent hold | | Swing | | |

The Mordens Ward
| Party | Candidate | Votes | % | ±% |
|---|---|---|---|---|
| Independent | Cicely Anne Elsa Murfitt | 549 | 70.8 | +7.8 |
| Conservative | Duncan Richard Bullivant | 142 | 18.3 | −6.9 |
| Labour | Angela Mary Patrick | 60 | 7.7 | N/A |
| Liberal Democrats | David Thurston | 24 | 3.1 | N/A |
| Majority | | 407 | 52.5 | |
| Turnout | | 775 | 40.5 | |
| Independent hold | | Swing | | |

The Shelfords and Stapleford Ward
| Party | Candidate | Votes | % | ±% |
|---|---|---|---|---|
| Conservative | Charles Reginald Nightingale | 960 | 46.2 | −11.2 |
| Labour | Mike Nettleton | 400 | 19.3 | +12.3 |
| Liberal Democrats | Bill Powell | 363 | 17.5 | −18.2 |
| Green | Linda Jane Whitebread | 355 | 17.1 | N/A |
| Majority | | 560 | 26.9 | |
| Turnout | | 2,078 | 36.4 | |
| Conservative hold | | Swing | | |

The Wilbrahams Ward
| Party | Candidate | Votes | % | ±% |
|---|---|---|---|---|
| Conservative | Robert John Turner | 443 | 61.6 | −9.3 |
| Labour | June Ford | 188 | 26.2 | N/A |
| Liberal Democrats | Ian Douglas Wallace | 88 | 12.2 | −16.8 |
| Majority | | 255 | 35.6 | |
| Turnout | | 719 | 33.1 | |
| Conservative hold | | Swing | | |

Waterbeach Ward
| Party | Candidate | Votes | % | ±% |
|---|---|---|---|---|
| Conservative | James Andrew Hockney | 919 | 57.0 | −3.3 |
| Liberal Democrats | Maurice Leonard Leeke | 502 | 31.1 | −5.6 |
| Labour | Paul Thomas Finley | 191 | 11.9 | +8.9 |
| Majority | | 417 | 25.9 | |
| Turnout | | 1,612 | 39.3 | |
| Conservative hold | | Swing | | |

Whittlesford Ward
| Party | Candidate | Votes | % | ±% |
|---|---|---|---|---|
| Conservative | Peter William Wilson Topping | 540 | 65.8 | +26.2 |
| Liberal Democrats | Clare Delderfield | 162 | 19.7 | −13.1 |
| Labour | Dinah Elizabeth Pounds | 119 | 14.5 | New |
| Majority | | 378 | 46.1 | |
| Turnout | | 820 | 39.2 | |
| Conservative hold | | Swing | | |

Willingham and Over Ward
| Party | Candidate | Votes | % | ±% |
|---|---|---|---|---|
| Conservative | Ray Maurice Antony Manning | 921 | 59.5 | −7.3 |
| Labour | Ben Monks | 438 | 28.3 | +21.9 |
| Liberal Democrats | Barry John Platt | 189 | 12.2 | −14.6 |
| Majority | | 483 | 31.2 | |
| Turnout | | 1,548 | 28.9 | |
| Conservative hold | | Swing | | |
