= 2008 South Cambridgeshire District Council election =

2008 UK local government election

South Cambridgeshire District Council election, 2008

Results by ward of the 2008 local election in South Cambridgeshire

Overall composition of the council following the 2008 election

Elections to South Cambridgeshire District Council took place on Thursday 1 May 2008, as part of the 2008 United Kingdom local elections. Twenty seats, making up just over one third of South Cambridgeshire District Council, were up for election. Both seats in Gamlingay were contested at this election after one of the councillors retired earlier in the year. Seats up for election in 2008 were last contested at the 2004 election, and were next contested at the 2012 election. The Conservative Party retained their majority on the council.

== Summary ==
At this election, Conservatives were defending 8 seats, Independents were defending 6 seats and Liberal Democrats 5 seats. Labour were defending their only seat on the council in Bassingbourn. Several councillors had switched parties in the year leading up to the election, with independents Mark Howell (Papworth and Elsworth) and Simon Edwards (Cottenham) joining the Conservatives, while Liberal Democrat James Quinlan (Whittlesford) ran for re-election as an independent. Incumbent Liberal Democrat Val Trueman also ran as an independent in Melbourn. Conservatives gained the latter two seats at the election, but lost in Girton to an independent candidate. No other seats changed hands.

== Results ==
South Cambridgeshire District Council election, 2008
Party	Seats				Popular vote	
Party	Won	Not up	Total	±	Votes	%
Conservative	9	23	32	+1	12,797	44.0
Liberal Democrats	5	10	15	0	9,362	32.2
Independent	5	4	9	−1	4,603	15.8
Labour	1	0	1	0	1,583	5.4
Green	0	0	0	0	693	2.4
UKIP	0	0	0	0	29	0.1
Total	20	37	57	–	29,067	–
Turnout						41.3

== Results by ward ==
Bassingbourn Ward
Party	Candidate	Votes	%	±%
Labour	Nigel Nielsen Cathcart	576	39.5	+6.8
Conservative	Adrian Neil Dent	447	30.7	−16.1
Independent	Peter James Robinson	247	16.9	N/A
Green	Simon Peter Saggers	188	12.9	−7.7
Majority		129		
Turnout			41.6	
Labour hold		Swing		

Bourn Ward
Party	Candidate	Votes	%	±%
Conservative	Mervyn Benjamin Loynes	922	49.4	−5.3
Liberal Democrats	Roger Keith Hume	778	41.7	+7.4
Labour	Mark David Hurn	168	8.9	+2.1
Majority		144		
Turnout			34.5	
Conservative hold		Swing		

Cottenham Ward
Party	Candidate	Votes	%	±%
Conservative	Simon Mark Edwards	1,256	57.6	+21.5
Liberal Democrats	Matthew James Barnett	583	26.8	+0.6
Green	Heather Anne Macbeth-Hornett	173	7.9	N/A
Labour	John Samuel Shepherd	167	7.7	N/A
Majority		673		
Turnout			36.2	
Conservative hold		Swing		

Gamlingay Ward
Party	Candidate	Votes	%	±%
Liberal Democrats	Sebastian Kindersley	1,030	34.3	−3.8
Liberal Democrats	Bridget Zoe Dorrington Smith	897	29.9	−1.2
Conservative	Celia Brenda Waldron	558	18.7	+2.3
Conservative	Lister John Wilson	507	16.9	+2.6
Turnout			41.0	
Liberal Democrats hold		Swing		
Liberal Democrats hold		Swing		

Girton Ward
Party	Candidate	Votes	%	±%
Independent	Douglas de Lacey	715	47.3	N/A
Conservative	Mark Jonathan Taylor	564	37.3	−18.3
Labour	Christopher Jones	104	6.9	N/A
Green	Teal Richard Riley	99	6.6	−13.6
UKIP	Helene Yvette Davis	29	1.9	N/A
Majority		151		
Turnout			46.8	
Independent gain from Conservative		Swing		

Harston and Hauxton Ward
Party	Candidate	Votes	%	±%
Liberal Democrats	Janet Elizabeth Lockwood	501	59.5	+13.7
Conservative	Richard Michael Turner	282	33.5	−3.9
Green	Jackie Garfit	59	7.0	−4.1
Majority		77		
Turnout			49.1	
Liberal Democrats hold		Swing		

Haslingfield and the Eversdens Ward
Party	Candidate	Votes	%	±%
Liberal Democrats	Liz Heazell	602	48.6	−8.7
Independent	Robin Page	471	38.1	N/A
Conservative	Mandy Lorraine Smith	165	13.3	−17.8
Majority		131		
Turnout			60.1	
Liberal Democrats hold		Swing		

Histon and Impington Ward
Party	Candidate	Votes	%	±%
Independent	Mike Mason	957	35.6	+19.1
Liberal Democrats	Vanessa Ann Kelly	900	33.4	−1.1
Conservative	Philip 'Scotty' Scott	632	23.5	−8.1
Labour	Christopher Jeffrey Wilson	129	4.8	−3.4
Green	William Jon Quinn	73	2.7	−1.7
Majority		57		
Turnout			42.3	
Independent hold		Swing		

Linton Ward
Party	Candidate	Votes	%	±%
Liberal Democrats	John Dennis Batchelor	939	58.3	−2.4
Conservative	Roger Keith Hickford	672	41.7	+8.9
Majority		267		
Turnout			45.3	
Liberal Democrats hold		Swing		

Longstanton Ward
Party	Candidate	Votes	%	±%
Independent	Alex Riley	435	55.0	−12.3
Conservative	Roger Owen Valentine	356	45.0	+24.1
Majority		79		
Turnout			43.2	
Independent hold		Swing		

Melbourn Ward
Party	Candidate	Votes	%	±%
Conservative	Val Barrett	1,053	55.5	+14.6
Liberal Democrats	Christine Dallas Cartwright	534	28.2	−23.1
Independent	Val Trueman	203	10.7	N/A
Labour	Hywel Lamont Jackson	107	5.6	N/A
Majority		519		
Turnout			45.5	
Conservative gain from Independent		Swing		

Papworth and Elsworth Ward
Party	Candidate	Votes	%	±%
Conservative	Mark Phillip Howell	unopposed	N/A	N/A
Conservative hold		Swing		

Sawston Ward
Party	Candidate	Votes	%	±%
Independent	Sally Ann Hatton	747	51.3	+28.9
Conservative	Richard Louis Denham	709	48.7	−0.8
Majority		38		
Turnout			27.2	
Independent hold		Swing		

The Mordens Ward
Party	Candidate	Votes	%	±%
Independent	Cicely Anne Elsa Demain Murfitt	547	63.1	−14.9
Conservative	Robert James Poulter	219	25.3	N/A
Green	Sam Morris	101	11.7	−10.3
Majority		328		
Turnout			47.3	
Independent hold		Swing		

The Shelfords and Stapleford Ward
Party	Candidate	Votes	%	±%
Conservative	Charles Reginald Nightingale	1,379	57.4	−7.6
Liberal Democrats	Sarah Catherine Whitebread	857	35.7	+13.5
Labour	Michael Robert Nettleton	168	6.9	−5.9
Majority		522		
Turnout			44.1	
Conservative hold		Swing		

The Wilbrahams Ward
Party	Candidate	Votes	%	±%
Conservative	Robert John Turner	639	70.9	+9.9
Liberal Democrats	Frances Amrani	262	29.1	−9.9
Majority		377		
Turnout			44.6	
Conservative hold		Swing		

Waterbeach Ward
Party	Candidate	Votes	%	±%
Conservative	James Andrew Hockney	1,148	60.3	+20.5
Liberal Democrats	Adrian James Wright	700	36.8	+3.1
Labour	Jess Blair	57	2.9	N/A
Majority		448		
Turnout			48.5	
Conservative hold		Swing		

Whittlesford Ward
Party	Candidate	Votes	%	±%
Conservative	Peter William Wilson Topping	403	39.6	+3.6
Liberal Democrats	Michael Kilpatrick	334	32.8	−31.2
Independent	James Alex Quinlan	282	27.7	N/A
Majority		69		
Turnout			51.3	
Conservative gain from Independent		Swing		

Willingham and Over Ward
Party	Candidate	Votes	%	±%
Conservative	Ray Maurice Antony Manning	1,109	66.8	+12.8
Liberal Democrats	Leslie Gelling	445	26.8	−8.9
Labour	Norman Alexander Crowther	107	6.4	N/A
Majority		664		
Turnout			32.9	
Conservative hold		Swing		
