= Petrina Holdsworth =

British politician (born 1952)

Chairman of the UK Independence Party
- In office September 2004 – 15 October 2005
- Leader: Roger Knapman
- Preceded by: David Lott
- Succeeded by: David Campbell Bannerman

Personal details
- Born: 1 October 1952 (age 74)
- Party: UK Independence Party
- Other political affiliations: United Kingdom First Party
- Education: London University

Petrina Alexandra Holdsworth (born 1 October 1952), is an English barrister turned politician, who was formerly National Chairman of the UK Independence Party (UKIP). She stood for election for UKIP in two general elections.

== Early life ==
Holdsworth was born in 1952. Her father was a scientist and her mother was a school headmistress. She was educated at a private school, then studied Law at London University (now the University of London).

== Career ==
Holdsworth was called to the bar in November 1975. In the late 1970s, she worked in the Inner London Magistrates' Court as a Deputy Clerk to the Justices. She went on to serve as a Principal Crown Prosecutor with the Criminal Prosecution Service, and then returned to private practice in London specialising in Crime and Industrial Tribunal work. She later trained in private detective work.

== Political career ==
Holdsworth joined UKIP in June 1999, drawn to the party due to her experiences of employment law. She represented the party as a candidate in two General Elections, standing against Nicholas Soames in Mid-Sussex in 2001, where she was the local UKIP constituency chairman; and Michael Howard (then leader of the Conservative Party) in Folkestone, where he had a 5,907 majority, in 2005.

She was elected to the UKIP National Executive Committee in 2004 and became Chairman of the NEC and National Chairman in that year. During this time she wrote "Bye, Bye English Legal System", which appeared on the UKIP website. Also in 2005, Holdsworth appeared on BBC1's political debate programme Question Time from Stirling in Scotland, alongside Michael Ancram, David Blunkett, Nicola Sturgeon and Jim Wallace. She participated in BBC2's The Election Roadshow from Oxford in Oxfordshire.

When Robert Kilroy-Silk announced that he was resigning from UKIP in early 2005, Holdsworth stated that his plans to create a new euro-sceptic political party were "extremely silly." When he launched the political party Veritas with other former UKIP members, she said that this would be "a parody of the party the men have left."

In October 2005, Holdsworth herself resigned from the UKIP party Chairmanship and NEC, but agreed to return a day later after undertakings were given by the then leader Roger Knapman in relation to the behaviour of one of UKIP's MEPs. However, following further internal difficulties she later resigned again, just days ahead of the party conference.

In May 2006, Holdsworth announced her intention to run for leader of UKIP, but later withdrew her candidacy due to her husband's ill health. She instead supported leadership candidate Richard Suchorzewski.

In the 2009 European Parliament Elections she ran as lead candidate in South East England for the newly formed United Kingdom First Party, whose leader was Robin Page.

Holdsworth was elected Chairman of The Campaign for an Independent Britain in mid-2014.

Party political offices
Preceded by David Lott	Chairman of the UK Independence Party; 2004–2005	Succeeded by David Campbell-Bannerman
