= Gordon Beningfield =

English painter

- Born: 31 October 1936; Bermondsey, London, United Kingdom
- Died: 4 May 1998 (aged 61)
- Occupations: Artist, broadcaster, naturalist
- Known for: Look Stranger (1974); In Deepest Britain (1976); In The Country (1980); A Brush with Hardy (1985)

Gordon George Beningfield (31 October 1936, Bermondsey – 4 May 1998, London) was an English wildlife artist, broadcaster and naturalist known for his watercolour artworks, most notably of butterflies.

== Early life and career ==
Born in Bermondsey, London, Beningfield moved to Hertfordshire in 1941 as a result of The Blitz. His father was a lighterman and an amateur artist, who Beningfield describes as his first influence. Describing his school life, Beningfield claimed he was good at "very little", no doubt a result of his struggles with dyslexia, despite this, however, his Headmaster encouraged him to paint frequently and also introduced him to the works of another lifelong influence, J. M. W. Turner

Upon leaving school, Beningfield worked for St Albans based studio called Faith-Craft. Faith-Craft was operated by the Anglican Church and produced ecclesiastical art in a variety of mediums including paintings, sculpture and stained glass windows. Using skills learned at Faith-Craft, Beningfield produced eight stained glass windows for the Guards Chapel. Upon leaving the organisation after thirteen years, Beningfield initially supported himself as a sculptor. Whilst this provided income, it also enabled Beningfield to work on his paintings with the goal of holding his first London exhibition. This took place at the Moorland Gallery on Cork Street, and was a success – Beningfield sold all of his paintings.

== Further career ==
Following the success of his inaugural exhibition, Beningfield became a freelance artist, working from the studio in his garden. Following continued success as an artist, in 1974 Beningfield was invited to participate in a television series for the BBC entitled Look Stranger. This would be the first of several forays into television for Beningfield, which included In Deepest Britain, The Country Game, In the Country and One Man and His Dog. Beningfield would later work on a documentary film, A Brush with Hardy, which celebrated his love for the works of Thomas Hardy.

Much of Beningfield's work involved butterflies, which he felt were overlooked. This decision to specialise on the insect led to the publication of Beningfield's first book, Beningfield's Butterflies, which was released in 1974. This specialisation also led to Beningfield being invited to design a set of Postage stamps for the Post Office in 1981. A further set, depicting a variety of British insects followed in 1985.

Further books would follow, including Beningfield's Countryside, which focused on the countryside in Hertfordshire and Dorset, and Hardy's Country which highlighted 'Hardy's Dorset'. Other's included Beningfield's English Landscapes and Poems of the Seasons. His final book Beningfield's Vanishing Songbirds, was published posthumously and was completed by his wife Betty and friend Robin Page.

Due to this fondness of the insect, Beningfield was made President of Butterfly Conservation following the death of inaugural President Sir Peter Scott in 1989. Following Beningfield's death in 1998, Sir David Attenborough was named president.

Beningfield once again got involved in the charity sector four years later, when he, along with Robin Page and Sir Laurens van der Post, founded the Countryside Restoration Trust, a farming charity which promotes and campaigns for environmentally sustainable methods in agriculture and works to restore wildlife habitats on its farms. Beningfield acted as Vice-Chairman of the Trust until his death.

== Personal life and legacy ==
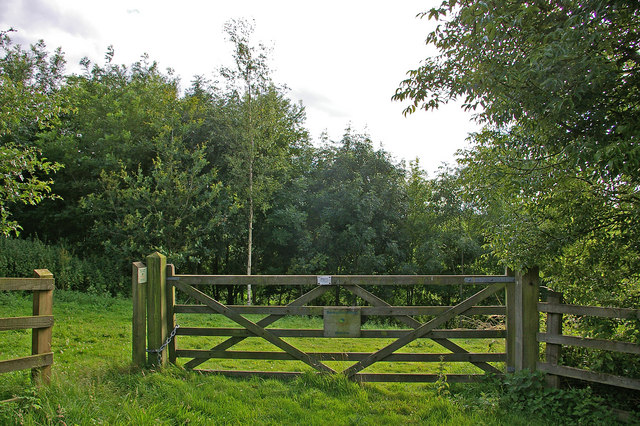
The entrance to Beningfield Wood

During his time in Hertfordshire, Beningfield lived in London Colney, Redbourn, and finally Water End, having moved to the village in 1980. In May 1998, Beningfield passed away as a result of cancer. He was buried at St John the Baptist church in Great Gaddesden, and is survived by his wife Betty and two daughters, Sally and Sarah.

A series of events was held in the summer of 2018 to commemorate the 20th anniversary of Beningfield's passing. These included a Flower festival at St John the Baptist Church as well as an exhibition of his artwork at the Natural History Museum.

Beningfield Wood, just outside West Milton, Dorset was named in his honour. Originally fields of improved grasslands, mixed native broadleaves were planted across the 8.3 ha (20.5 acre) site in 1995.

In 2015, the Countryside Restoration Trust announced the 'Gordon Beningfield Dorset Farm Appeal'. The appeal aimed to turn Beningfield's dream of a working, wildlife-friendly farm in Hardy's Dorset, into a reality by raising £1 million. Shortly after the appeals launch, it was announced that Dame Judi Dench would serve as its patron.
