= Jury Team =

- Leader: Sir Paul Judge
- Founded: 13 March 2009
- Dissolved: 9 May 2011
- Headquarters: 152 Grosvenor Road, London, SW1 3JL, United Kingdom
- Ideology: Nonpartisan politics; Localism; Direct democracy; English Nationalism
- Political position: Big tent (claimed) Right-Wing
- National affiliation: Alliance for Democracy (2010)

Website
- http://www.juryteam.org/

The Jury Team was a British political campaign established in 2009 to back independent candidates in United Kingdom domestic and European elections. Although it was a registered UK political party, it was described as an umbrella organisation giving financial and marketing backing to independent candidates, who were free to set their own political agenda outside of the traditional model of standing as the candidate of a particular party. Jury Team employed a novel selection process for its independent candidates, allowing any member of the public to apply to be promoted for backing, and leaving final candidate selection to the public, by text message voting. After contesting the European Parliament elections in June 2009, the Jury Team's first Independent United Kingdom parliamentary candidate was John Smeaton, who stood in the 2009 Glasgow North East by-election.

The organisation was dissolved in 2011. None of its candidates was ever elected.

== Foundation ==
The Jury Team campaign for more independent politicians was launched on 8 March 2009 by Sir Paul Judge, a businessman and former director-general of the Conservative Party. Jury Team was registered with the UK's Electoral Commission's Register of Political Parties on 13 March 2009, eligible to field candidates in England, Scotland and Wales. Judge was the registered Jury Team Leader and Treasurer, while Alan Wallace was the Jury Team Nominating Officer.

== Politics ==
The name Jury Team reflected the idea behind the jury, that "regular people can make decisions about complex problems with integrity and without any vested interests".

Jury Team was described as an umbrella organisation, with the purpose of giving Independent non-party candidates the platform to compete against the established UK political parties, free of party allegiance and a party whip. The Jury Team aimed to "break the traditional party leaderships' control over the political process". A YouGov poll commissioned by Jury Team as part of its launch suggested that 55% of electors would vote for an independent candidate if they thought they had a realistic chance of being elected.

Jury Team had no manifesto or specific policies; any member of the public who was considered to be "committed to the principles of good governance, including selflessness, integrity, openness and honesty" could be publicised by the organisation as a potential Jury Team candidate, and candidates were selected by a system of public voting by text message. The Jury Team candidates that stood in the 2009 European elections represented both sides of the political spectrum as well as those representing several single issue platforms.

As well as Jury Team, Jury Team Party and Jury Team Independents, the organisation also registered the following as official Party Descriptions: Democracy 2.0, Democracy, Accountability, Transparency, Politics for the People, Politics Isn't Working, Politics with Principles and Politics without Parties.

While Jury Team had no party policies, they did declare 12 basic principles on issues of governance and representation, covering areas such as term limits and pay transparency for elected representatives, changes to the operation of select committees and government departments, independence of statistical reporting and complaints functions, and changes to the rules regarding referendums and calling of general elections. They opposed the alternative vote and said that the AV referendum was a "political stitch-up".

== Candidate selection ==
According to its founder and leader Sir Paul Judge, Jury Team Independent candidates "legally committed themselves to our three guiding principles of democracy, accountability and transparency and to abiding by the seven Nolan Principles of Public Life", and "had all "pledged to vote on conscience for the good of their constituents and the country and will not be required to obey a party whip".

Jury Team Independent candidates for the 2009 European Parliament elections could stand for selection in every British European Parliament constituency region except Northern Ireland. Candidates individual political positions were promoted through the Jury Team website between 16 March to 24 April 2009, during which time the public could vote for their preferred candidates. The successful candidates in each region were then ranked by the number of text votes cast, in order to produce a 'party list' for each region according to their allocated number of seats. (European Parliament seats from in England, Scotland and Wales are allocated using a system of proportional representation using the d'Hondt formula.)

On 25 September 2009 it was announced that John Smeaton, an airport worker who came to national attention for intervening in the 2007 Glasgow International Airport attack, would be the first candidate selected by Jury Team to stand for a seat in the Westminster Parliament, and would contest the 2009 Glasgow North East by-election for the vacant seat formerly held by the Speaker of the House Michael Martin.

== Elections ==
=== European Parliament election 2009 ===
Jury Team backed 59 Independent candidates in the 2009 European Parliament elections. No Jury Team candidate gained a seat; the candidates collectively registered 0.5% of the total votes cast in Great Britain, ranking Jury Team candidates as a whole 13th among other parties in Great Britain.

=== Glasgow North East by-election, 2009 ===
John Smeaton stood as the Jury Team backed Independent candidate in the 2009 Glasgow North East by-election, he came eighth out of 13 candidates with 258 votes.

=== 2010 general election ===
Jury Team fielded independent candidates in the 2010 general election, on 6 May 2010. The group hoped to increase on the number of 5 independent MPs elected in 2005 out of a total of 646 currently sitting in the House of Commons. No Jury Team candidates were elected MPs.

== Funding ==
The Jury Team campaign was funded by Sir Paul Judge from his estimated £30m personal wealth, together with three other financial backers. The organisation's financial rules precluded individual donations of more than £50,000, in line with the 2006 Sir Hayden Phillips inquiry.

== Reception ==
Jury Team's candidate public vote by text message selection method was likened to the reality TV shows The X-Factor and American Idol. TIME magazine called the movement similar to the reality show American Idol Jury Team's lack of manifesto attracted the moniker the "anti-party party". Anthony King stated of Jury Team that "The idea that a non-party party could get very far is farfetched."

== See also ==
- Alliance for Democracy
- List of political parties in the United Kingdom
- List of UK minor party and independent MPs elected
- Non-partisan democracy
