= Jan Jananayagam =

Sri Lankan politician and banker

Janani Jananayagam

Personal details
- Born: Jaffna, Sri Lanka
- Party: Independent
- Education: University of Manchester; Imperial College London; INSEAD
- Occupation: Project Manager
- Website: http://vote4jan.org/beta/

Janani Jananayagam (Tamil: ஜனனி (ஜான்) ஜனநாயகம்) is a British Tamil banking professional, activist and politician. She was an independent candidate for the London region in the 2009 European Parliamentary elections.

== Early life ==
Jan was born in Jaffna, Sri Lanka but spent most of her youth in Nigeria and Zambia where her parents were teachers. Later she and her parents emigrated to the United Kingdom. She studied at the University of Manchester and graduated with distinction in computing and information systems. She later received a master's degree in applied mathematics from Imperial College London and a Master of Business Administration from INSEAD business school.

== Professional career ==
After a period in computing research and development Jan moved into the banking industry. She currently works in the London and German offices of a leading Italian bank as a project manager. She is involved in the setting up of e-commerce ventures. Jananayagam has written columns in the Tamil Guardian that focused on Sri Lanka's treatment of Tamils.

== European Parliament candidate ==
Jan stood as an independent candidate for the London region in the 2009 European Parliamentary elections. She did not win a seat, but garnered 2.86% of the vote. The main policies on which she campaigned on were:

- Civil rights and individual freedom
- Financial transparency and effective regulation
- Equality and diversity
- Small businesses and entrepreneurship
- Ethical foreign policy
- Animal welfare

She campaigned against the British National Party.

She had been endorsed by the Oscar-nominated musician Maya Arulpragasam (MIA). MIA started an online campaign in support of Jan and offered a free song.

Despite winning many votes for an Independent, she did not win a seat against competitive parties. Jan came 8th out of the 19 parties/independents contesting London after receiving 50,014 votes (2.86%). This was more than the combined vote for all other independent candidates across the whole of the UK. Her £5000 deposit was returned, as she got more than the 2.5% threshold in the vote.

Votes received by Jan for each London borough:

Borough	Votes	%	Pos	Borough	Votes	%	Pos	Borough	Votes	%	Pos
Barking and Dagenham	386	1.08%	10th	Hammersmith & Fulham	140	0.35%	13th	Lewisham	1,992	3.76%	8th
Barnet	1,234	1.51%	8th	Haringey				Newham	3,520	7.40%	3rd
Bexley	378	0.62%	11th	Harrow	6,856	11.00%	3rd	Redbridge	4,910	7.81%	6th
Brent	4,867	8.33%	5th	Havering	203	0.33%	13th	Richmond upon Thames	147	0.28%	13th
Bromley	619	0.71%	9th	Hillingdon	2,433	3.96%	7th	Southwark	163	0.30%	13th
Camden	121	0.26%	15th	Hounslow	1,054	2.09%	8th	Sutton	1,664	3.40%	7th
Croydon	3,128	3.87%	8th	Islington	128	0.30%	15th	Tower Hamlets	109	0.24%	16th
Ealing	4,716	6.51%	6th	Kensington & Chelsea	70	0.26%	15th	Waltham Forest	1,493	2.86%	8th
Enfield	1,194	1.83%	8th	Kingston upon Thames	2,150	5.16%	6th	Wandsworth	928	1.35%	8th
Greenwich	773	1.53%	9th	Lambeth	176	0.31%	14th	Westminster	100	0.27%	16th
Hackney				Merton	3,960	7.95%	6th	City of London	4	0.19%	=14th
