= David Lott =

British politician

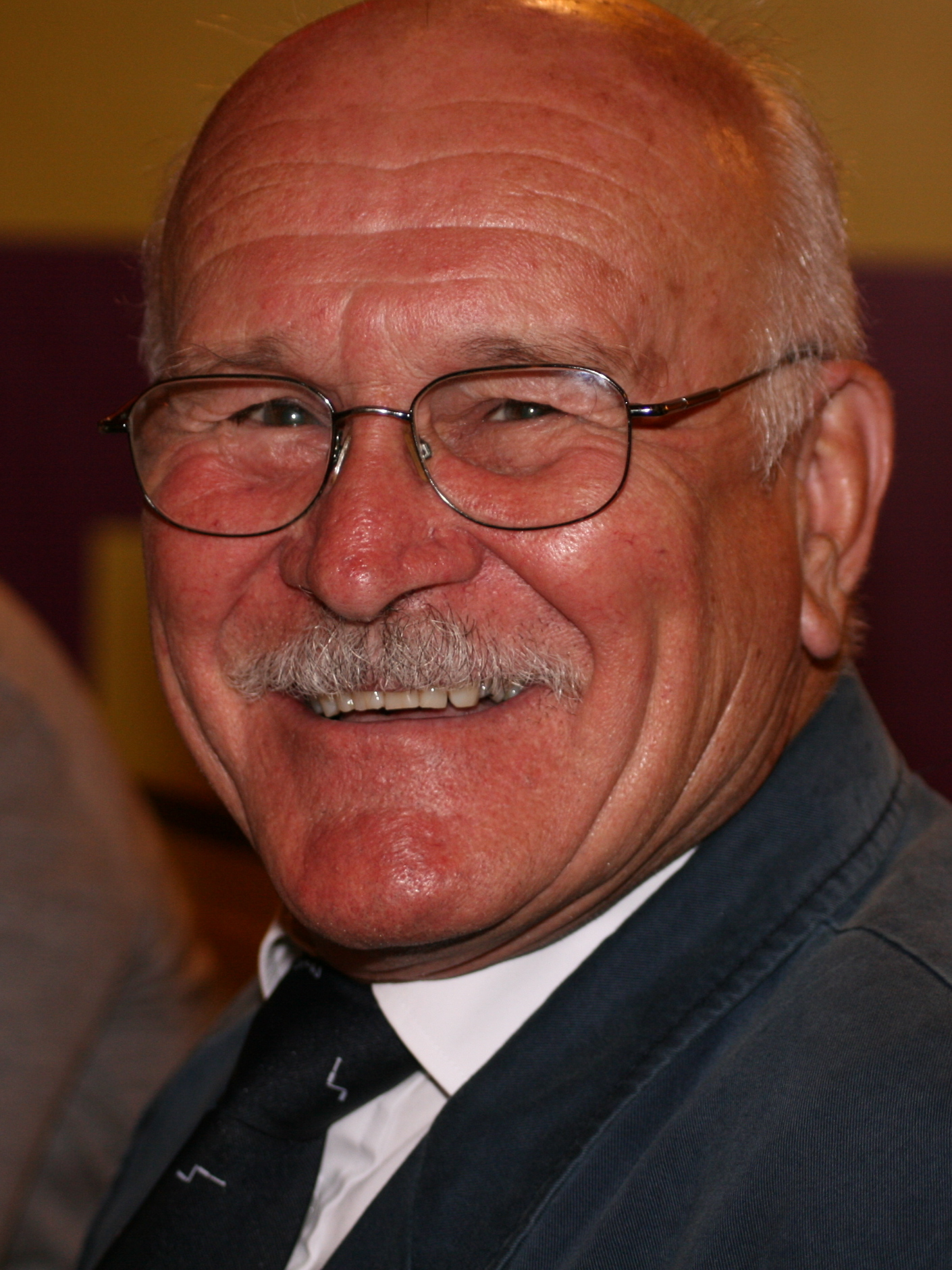
- Lott at the 2009 UKIP conference

Chairman of the UK Independence Party
- In office 5 October 2002 – September 2004
- Leader: Roger Knapman
- Preceded by: Mike Nattrass
- Succeeded by: Petrina Holdsworth

Personal details
- Party: UK Independence Party

David Lott is a British politician, best known as a political organiser for the UK Independence Party (UKIP).

Lott worked in the air force, then as a pilot for Britannia Airways. He retired at the age of 53, intending to spend his time hunting, but instead joined the fledgling UK Independence Party in 1994. He stood for the party in Northumbria at the 1994 European Parliament election, taking 4.2% of the votes cast. After the election, he spent much of his time working for the party, touring the country, organising local branches. He also stood in Hexham at the 1997 general election, where he took 2.5% of the vote.

In 1997, Lott along with Nigel Farage and Michael Holmes was expelled from the party by Alan Sked backed by the UKIP NEC for organising an enquiry to discover why UKIP (with no money and 187 candidates) had not won the 1997 general election. After a legal challenge which the party lacked funds to fight, they were all readmitted. However, he resigned from the party's NEC soon after the appointment of Michael Holmes as Sked's successor. After working on Peter Davies's campaign in the Yorkshire South by-election in 1998, Lott spent a year touring the United States, then went on to Australia, before return to lead the party's campaign at the 1999 European election. The following year, he organised the EGM which saw Holmes deposed as party leader.

At the 2001 general election, Lott stood in the Isle of Wight, where he took 3.3% of the vote. From 2002 to 2004, he served as the party chairman, and he was third on the party's South East England list for the 2004 European election. He ran the party's 2005 general election campaign, then became the party's Brussels team leader.

Party political offices
Preceded by Mike Nattrass	Chairman of the UK Independence Party; 2002–2004	Succeeded by Petrina Holdsworth
