= Christian Party (UK) =

British political party

- Leader: Jeff Green
- Founder: George Hargreaves
- Founded: 2004; 22 years ago
- Split from: Christian Peoples Alliance
- Ideology: Christian right; Social conservatism; British unionism; Euroscepticism
- Political position: Right-wing
- National affiliation: Alliance for Democracy (2010)

Website
- http://www.ukchristianparty.org/

The Christian Party (also known as the Scottish Christian Party and Welsh Christian Party (Welsh: Plaid Gristnogol)) is a minor Christian political party in Great Britain.

== History ==
The party originated as Operation Christian Vote, founded by George Hargreaves, a Pentecostal minister and former songwriter, in May 2004. It was based in Stornoway, Scotland. It contested the 2004 European Elections in the Scotland constituency, gaining 1.8% of the popular vote.

Hargreaves was a candidate for Operation Christian Vote in the Birmingham Hodge Hill by-election in 2004 where he received 90 votes, last place in a field of seven candidates, and lost his deposit. In the 2005 general election, Hargreaves stood in Na h-Eileanan an Iar, where he was placed fourth, ahead of the Conservatives, and retained his deposit with 1,048 votes or 7.6%. The party was involved in protests, such as at Glasgow.

The party became known as the Christian Party.

== Registration as a party ==
The party was registered by the Electoral Commission on 29 April 2004, with the name Christian Party "Proclaiming Christ's Lordship".

In June 2012, legal action was taken against the Christian Party treasurer by the Electoral Commission for £2,750 for failure to supply accounts for two years as well as for failure to pay previous fines. The party de-registered the following month. Hargreaves was given a further six months to supply accounts, but failed to do so and was consequently fined a further £3,000 on top of a previous fine of £1,125 for failing to meet the deadline for provision of accounts.

As a result, the party was de-registered in July 2012 and, after the regulatory six months had elapsed, re-registered under a new party RPP under the leadership of Jeff Green. Sue Green is the party treasurer and Dr Donald Boyd is the nominating officer and leader of the Scottish Christian Party. The leader of the Welsh Christian Party and overall leader is Jeff Green.

== Elections ==
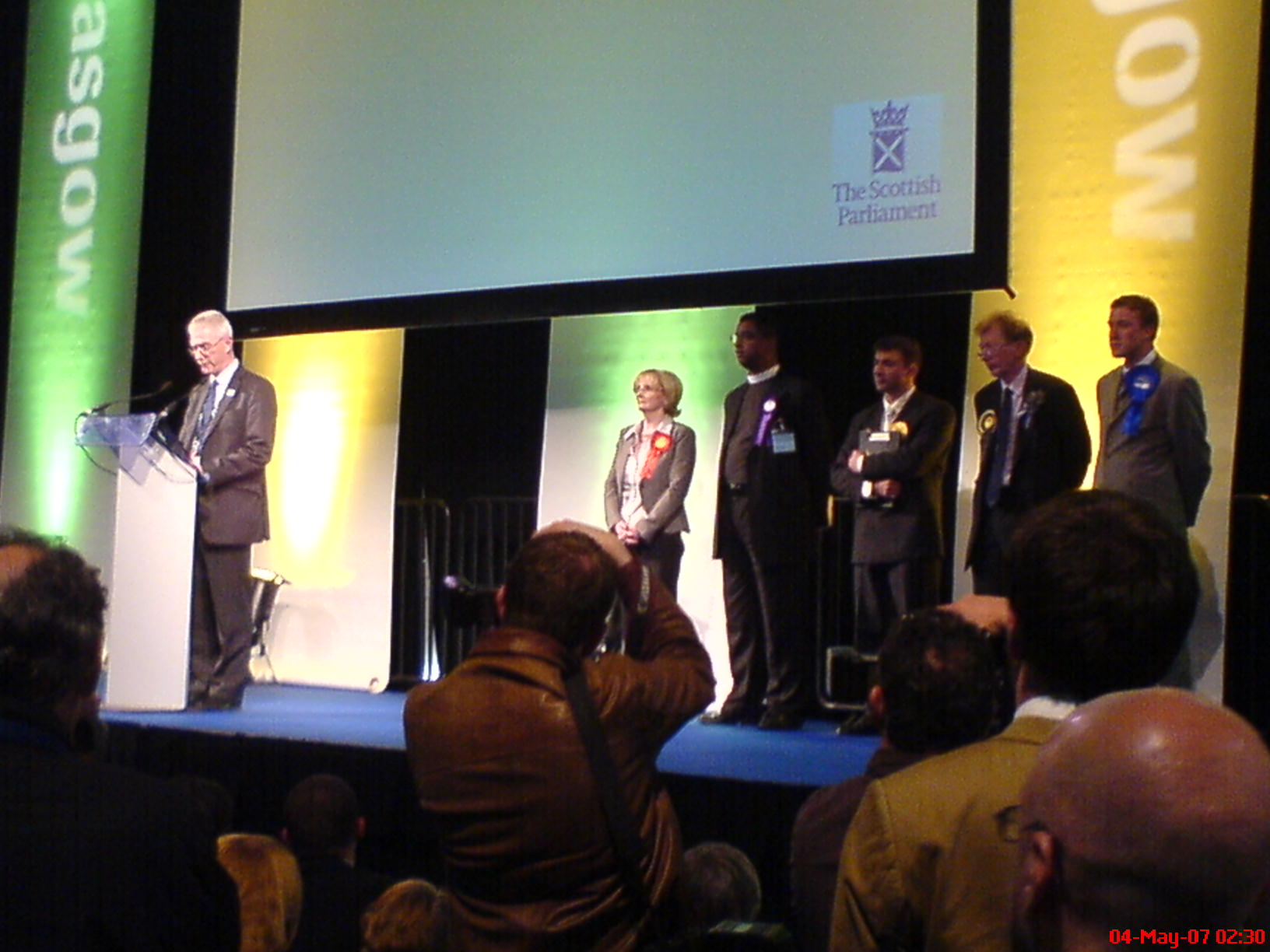
The Rev Hargreaves (second from left in candidates line-up) and other candidates who contested the Glasgow Baillieston constituency in the 2007 Scottish Parliament election.

Candidates from the party stood in the Sedgefield and Ealing Southall by-elections in 2007. The party received 26,575 votes (0.7%) in the 2007 Scottish Parliament election and 8,693 votes (0.9%) in the 2007 Welsh Assembly Election; it did not win any seats.

Hargreaves stood for the party at the 2008 Haltemprice and Howden by-election, and received 76 votes or 0.3% of the total votes cast.

The party competed in the 2009 European elections. Its campaign was mainly focused in London. The British Humanist Association had put up advertisements on London buses saying "there's probably no God, now stop worrying and enjoy your life". The party then produced similar adverts saying "there definitely is a God, so join the Christian Party and enjoy your life". The advert received over 1,000 complaints. On election day, the party retained one deposit in the London region, gaining 51,336 votes (2.9%).

In the 2010 general election, the party stood 71 candidates, gaining 18,623 votes.

The newly re-registered Christian Party contested the Eastleigh by-election in February 2013 with its candidate, Kevin Milburn, a retired former prison officer and health care worker, who stood against same-sex marriage. He received 163 votes (0.4%).

The party fielded nine candidates in the 2015 general election who between them polled 3,205 votes. Only John Cormack in Na h-Eileanan an Iar (Western Isles) saved his deposit with 6.6%; the other eight each received less than 1% of the votes cast. At the 2016 Scottish Parliament election, in the Na h-Eileanan an Iar constituency Cormack received 8.8% of the vote, coming fourth ahead of the Liberal Democrats.

In the 2017 general election, the party fielded two candidates in Scotland.

In the 2019 general election, the party ran an alliance with the Christian Peoples Alliance.

The party fielded two candidates in the 2024 general election.

== Policies ==
The party's mission statement is "Christians working together to bring Christian concern, goodwill and action into the community, education, business and politics."

The party's website includes a statement of its policies which include the following:

Banking

- Promote personal and corporate financial responsibility
- Promote government creation of money to be managed by the Bank of England to avoid national indebtedness to commercial banks

Law and order

- Change the role of the Social Services to support parental authority
- Make contraception for minors illegal without parental approval
- Re-instate in loco parentis as a fundamental principle of school teaching

Health

- Make private health insurance a visa requirement for migrants
- Oblige private medical insurers to inform the Home Office when a private medical insurance policy linked to a visa is allowed to lapse or expires
- Review and reduce Health and Safety legislation

Social security

- Reform the benefit system to remove the risk associated with leaving the welfare system and entering work. This would be accomplished by suspending benefit claims for a period of 9 months rather than closing them when an unemployed person gains employment. Within the 9-month period an unemployed person will be able to audit three jobs before their claim is liable to closure.

Immigration

- Negotiated agreement with the European Union to apply the immigration points system to migrants from the European Union, or in the event of non-agreement the declaration of a unilateral change in immigration policy
- Make private health insurance a visa requirement for immigrants
- Initiate a "No (private sector) Home – No Visa" policy

Environment

- Challenge the increasing levels of consumption
- Have Sunday restored as a day of rest
- Seek a new global financial system which supports sustainable use of resources

Government and democracy

- Support significant cuts in the public sector workforce in order to reduce the size of government and the size of the government spending
- Support a major re-employment and training programme to make it easier for public sector workers to transfer to the private sector
- Call for a referendum on the Lisbon Treaty within the first year of the new Parliament

"Respect for the human person"

- Oppose abortion
- Opposing the legal recognition of same-sex marriage
- Support funding for hospices which provide terminal or palliative care for adults, children and infants

Defence

- Maintain a well resourced military with a nuclear deterrent
- Support the doctrine of a just war, but not military adventurism
- Withdraw British troops from Afghanistan

In 2007, George Hargreaves campaigned to replace the Flag of Wales with the Flag of Saint David, claiming that the red dragon on the Welsh flag was "nothing less than the sign of Satan".

== See also ==
- Alliance for Democracy (UK)
- Christian Party election results
- ProLife Alliance (1997–2004)
- Christian Peoples Alliance
