= United Kingdom First Party =

British political party

- Leader: Robin Page
- Founded: 2009
- Dissolved: 2010
- Ideology: Populism; Euroscepticism
- National affiliation: Alliance for Democracy
- Colours: Red, white and blue

Website
- www.ukfp.org

The United Kingdom First Party was a small short-lived populist, Eurosceptic British political party, founded in 2009. It fielded candidates in three English regions for the 2009 European parliamentary elections: the East Midlands, the East of England and the South East.

The party agreed to work with the Popular Alliance during the election, in order to achieve the two parties' goals, with each party saying it had similar backgrounds and goals.

It disbanded in 2010 after its failure in the European parliamentary elections. It was voluntarily deregistered in April 2010.

== Policies ==
The party placed its opposition to British membership of the European Union in the context of a desire to reduce "the cost, the scope and the number of layers of government". It set out a brief summary of its policies, with an undertaking to develop them further after the European elections, influenced by the outcome, towards simpler taxation, smaller government and less centralisation.

The party also stated that it believed in freedom for Britain to negotiate its own trade deals individually or as part of a trade bloc, free speech and the ability to hold politicians to account through referendums.

== European Parliament election, 2009 ==
Candidates for the European Parliament in 2009 included the journalist and former presenter of One Man and His Dog, Robin Page, and the former UK Independence Party chairman Petrina Holdsworth.

The candidates pledged to serve only one term, not to employ family members, to publish their accounts and refuse invitations to "sit on committees of the European Parliament nor attend the plenaries in Brussels and Strasbourg except in the case of a vote which the party leadership regards as of critical importance to British interests".

At the 2009 European election, UK First received 74,000 votes – 0.5% of the national vote – and none of its candidates were elected.

=== MEP candidate list, 2009 ===
Eastern Region	South East Region	East Midlands Region
Robin Page	Petrina Holdsworth	Ian Gillman
Bruce Lawson	Martin Haslam	David Noakes
John West	John Petley	Christopher Elliot
Peter Cole		Mariann French
Len Baynes		Nadine Platt

== See also ==
- Alliance for Democracy
