= Paul Judge =

British businessman and philanthropist (1949–2017)

Sir Paul Judge
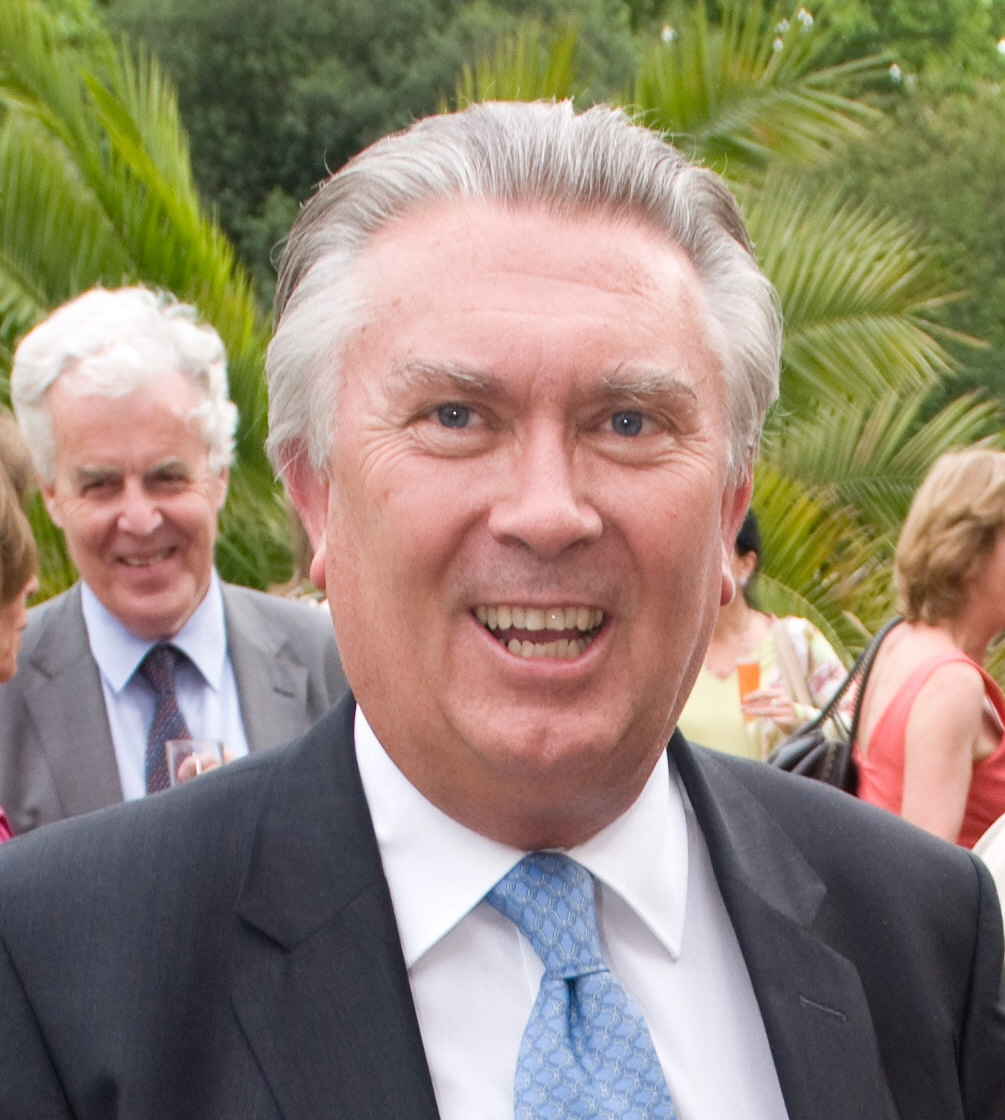
- Paul Judge in June 2011
- Born: Paul Rupert Judge; 25 April 1949; London, England
- Died: 21 May 2017 (aged 68); London, England
- Education: St Dunstan's College
- Alma mater: Trinity College, Cambridge; University of Pennsylvania
- Occupations: Businessman; philanthropist; political leader
- Title: Chairman of Schroder Income Growth Fund plc
- Political party: Conservative (before 2009); Jury Team (2009–2011)
- Board member of: Eurasian Natural Resources Corporation, Tempur-Pedic, The Abraaj Group
- Spouses: Jane Urquart (m. 1976; div. 1980); Anne Foff (m. 1983; div. 2001); Barbara Singer Thomas (m. 2002)
- Children: 2

Sir Paul Rupert Judge (25 April 1949 – 21 May 2017) was an English business and political figure. He served as Chairman of the Royal Society of Arts, President of the Chartered Management Institute, and Deputy Chairman of the American Management Association. He also served as the Director General of the Conservative Party and a Ministerial Advisor to the Cabinet Office. He was educated at Trinity College, Cambridge.

== Early life ==
Paul Rupert Judge was born at Queen Charlotte's and Chelsea Hospital in London on 25 April 1949. As a child, he attended St Dunstan's College, an independent school in Catford, London. Following this, he went up to study at Trinity College, Cambridge, after being awarded an Open Scholarship.

Later in life, he was appointed a Thouron Fellow at the Wharton School at the University of Pennsylvania. He maintained close ties to the University of Cambridge all his life and was major benefactor to the Cambridge Judge Business School, which is named in his honour.

== Career ==
His early career was with Cadbury Schweppes, where he undertook a number of international postings and projects, and where he led the buyout of their food companies in 1985 to form Premier Brands, which was successfully sold in 1989. In the 1990s, he was Chairman of Food from Britain, Director General of the Conservative Party (1992–95) and a Ministerial Advisor to the Cabinet Office, resigning in 2009, disillusioned by scandals.

In the 2000s, he was Chairman of the Royal Society of Arts and of Teachers TV, President of the Chartered Management Institute, Deputy Chairman of the American Management Association, a Director of Standard Bank Group of South Africa, which is Africa's largest bank and is quoted on the Johannesburg Stock Exchange, and Master of the Worshipful Company of Marketors.

== Appointments ==
Judge's honorary appointments included being an Alderman of the City of London, President of The Chartered Institute of Marketing and of the Association of MBAs, Chairman of the Enterprise Education Trust, of St Dunstan's College and of the British-Serbian Chamber of Commerce, UK Chairman of the British–North American Committee, a Special Adviser to the Royal Institute of International Affairs at Chatham House where he chaired the North American Advisory Council and a Member of the Council of the Crown Agents.

He was the President of Togo's International Advisory Council and was a member of the Advisory Board for HEC in Paris, for the Athens University of Economics and Business and for the Russian Presidential Academy of National Economy and Public Administration. He was an Emeritus Trustee of The Cambridge Foundation and a member of the University of Cambridge's Alumni Advisory Board (for which he chaired the University's Alumni Communications Group), and in 1990 he endowed £8 million to the University of Cambridge for the foundation of the Cambridge Judge Business School.

Judge was also a Member of the Finance Committee and of the Alumni Advisory Committee of Trinity College, Cambridge. From 2005 to 2008, he was Chair of the Teachers TV Board of Governors and from 2000 to 2009 was Chairman of the Marketing Standards Board.

=== UK commercial appointments ===
At his death, Judge was Chairman of Schroder Income Growth Fund, a European equity focused investment trust, a director of ENRC plc, whose main mining assets are in Kazakhstan, Southern Africa and Brazil, and of the United Kingdom Accreditation Service, which is the government-sponsored umbrella body for International ISO and other standards in the UK.

As well as his career with Cadbury Schweppes, Judge previously was a main board director of the Boddington Group, Grosvenor Development Capital and the WPP Group. He was a member of the Advisory Board for Barclays Private Bank from 2000 to 2009.

=== Further international appointments ===
Judge was a Director of Tempur-Pedic International Inc. of Lexington, Kentucky, which is the biggest global mattress and bedding brand and is quoted on the New York Stock Exchange and of The Abraaj Group of Dubai, which is the world's leading emerging markets private equity group.

His honorary appointments included being the Chairman of the British-Serbian Chamber of Commerce, UK Chairman of the British–North American Committee, a Special Adviser to the Royal Institute of International Affairs at Chatham House and a Member of the Council of the Crown Agents and he was a member of the advisory board of OMFIF. He was a member of the President of Togo's International Advisory Council and on the Advisory Board for HEC in Paris, for the Athens University of Economics and Business and for the Russian Presidential Academy of National Economy and Public Administration.

He was previously Chairman of the Wharton Board for Europe, Middle East and Africa from 2001 to 2009 and on the Advisory Board for Lynka Promotional Solutions of Kraków.

== Other honours ==
He was elected as Alderman of the City of London for the Ward of Tower in 2007 and served on the Corporation's Finance Committee. He was a Freeman of the City of London, Liveryman of the Worshipful Company of Marketors and of the Worshipful Company of Clothworkers and a Court Assistant of the Company of Educators. Sir Paul served as the first Master of the Worshipful Company of Entrepreneurs in 2014-15.

Judge was the Aldermanic Sheriff of the City of London for 2013–14.

He was a Fellow of the Royal Society of Arts, the Institute of Directors, The Chartered Institute of Marketing and the Marketing Society and a Companion of the Chartered Management Institute.

Judge had an honorary Doctor of Laws degree from the University of Cambridge, an honorary Doctor of Letters degree from the University of Westminster, an honorary Doctor of Science degree from City University and an honorary doctorate from the University of Belgrade in Serbia. He was an Honorary Professor of the Cyprus International Institute of Management and of the Sinerghia Institute of Moscow. He was the founding chairman of the Museum of Brands from 2003 until his death. In the 1996 New Year Honours, he was knighted for political and public service. On 17 December 2013, Judge was appointed a Brother of the Order of St John by Queen Elizabeth II.

=== Cambridge Judge Business School ===
In 1990, the University of Cambridge announced that it would be naming its world-ranking business school after Judge, a British businessman and Cambridge alumnus. Judge provided an endowment of £8 million to the University as a financial foundation for the Cambridge Judge Business School. At the time, this was one of the largest donations to any British university, though subsequent endowments have grown progressively larger. He was an Emeritus Trustee of the Cambridge Foundation and a member of the University of Cambridge's Alumni Advisory Board (for which he chaired the University's Alumni Communications Group).

Judge maintained an active presence at the University of Cambridge throughout his life, serving in a number of positions and working with his business colleagues to help make the University of endowment the largest of any university outside the United States. Judge was also a Member of the Finance Committee and of the Alumni Advisory Committee of Trinity College.

=== Independent political movement ===
On 8 March 2009, Judge launched a new political movement aimed at promoting independent thought and open governance, termed the Jury Team. The organisation was designed to promote independent candidates with no party allegiance.

== Personal life and death ==
He married Jane Urquart at Trinity College Chapel on 10 July 1976, and their divorce was finalised on 24 April 1980. In 1983, he married Anne Foff; they had two children and divorced in 2001. In 2002, he married Barbara Singer Thomas, chairman of the Pension Protection Fund. He had two sons from his marriage to Anne. Judge died in the London Borough of Lambeth on 21 May 2017, aged 68.

Following Judge's death, numerous tributes were written about him from the marketing industry, the Association of MBAs and entrepreneurs he had supported.

== Sources ==
- Biography, Wharton, University of Pennsylvania
- Profile, Bloomberg Business Week
- Profile, National School of Government
- Profile, City of London
