= Robin Page (journalist) =

British journalist (1943–2023)

Robin Page (3 May 1943 – 27 May 2023) was an English farmer, conservationist and political activist, who worked as a journalist and television presenter.

Page farmed in Barton, Cambridgeshire where he was born, and his work focused on rural affairs.

== Countryside Restoration Trust ==
Page founded the CRT in 1993 with the late artist and conservationist, Gordon Beningfield. It promotes a "living" countryside including wildlife-friendly farming. By 2021, when Page's Executive Chairmanship of the CRT ended, it had developed into a nationwide chain of 18 small farms involved with principles of conservation of land, wildlife and farming. As at 2021 Page continued to serve as a trustee.

Later projects involving the CRT included an attempt in 2020 to buy a farm in the Lake District. This would have been a community-based project involving the Friends of the Lake District and the author and farmer James Rebanks.

== Media work ==
=== Print ===
Page was the author of numerous books, such as The Wildlife of the Royal Estates, 1984 (foreword by the Duke of Edinburgh) and The Hunting Gene, 2000 (foreword by Robin Hanbury-Tenison). These are mainly published by Bird's Farm Books based in Barton. Until 2016 he wrote a long-running column for The Daily Telegraph.

Page's views about conservation were sometimes controversial, for example his call for blanket protection to be removed from birds of prey, on the premise that their population is unnaturally high, causing excessive destruction of many songbirds and other prey. According to BBC wildlife presenter Chris Packham, a 2015 article by Page about raptors was "an idiotic, ill informed rant" by someone with "no qualified understanding of even basic ecology".

=== Television ===
In the 1990s Page presented One Man and His Dog on BBC Television, which featured sheepdog trials.

== Political career ==
Page was elected to South Cambridgeshire District Council as an independent in 1972, holding his seat until he resigned in 2006.

Page stood as the Conservative Party candidate in Bethnal Green and Bow at the 1979 general election, finishing in third place.

A Eurosceptic, Page campaigned for the UK to leave the European Union. At the 1997 general election he stood in South Cambridgeshire for the Referendum Party. He subsequently joined the UK Independence Party (UKIP), standing in the Winchester by-election later the same year, and again in South Cambridgeshire at the 2005 general election.

Page resigned from UKIP after not being selected as a party candidate for the East of England constituency at the 2009 European Elections. He said that the party's MEPs were part of a "gravy train", and that leader Nigel Farage dominated the party excessively. He joined the UK First Party, and was the lead candidate on their list in the East of England. The UK First Party disbanded in 2010 and in the 2010 United Kingdom general election he stood for a third time in South Cambridgeshire, as an independent.

Page supported fox hunting.

== Allegations of racism ==
In 2002, Page was arrested, based upon false allegations of inciting racial hatred in a speech he gave at a fair in Gloucestershire, but was later released as police were of the opinion that no crime had been committed. Page said that he was framed by Gloucestershire Police. In 2008 Gloucestershire Police made a four-figure payment to Page for his wrongful arrest, conceding and compensating him for his complaint.

In 2016 Page again attracted controversy by making remarks (which he dismissed as a joke) about deceiving immigrants into taking contraceptive drugs.

== Death ==
Page died from pancreatic cancer on 27 May 2023, at the age of 80.

== Elections contested ==
Date of election	Constituency	Party	Votes	%
1979	Bethnal Green and Bow	Conservative	5,567	19.5
1997	South Cambridgeshire	Referendum Party	3,300	6.1
1997 Winchester by-election	Winchester	UK Independence Party (UKIP)	521	1.0
2005	South Cambridgeshire	UK Independence Party (UKIP)	1,556	3.0
2009 European Election	East of England	UK First Party	38,185	2.4
2010	South Cambridgeshire	Independent	1,968	3.3
