= 2009 European Parliament election in the United Kingdom =

- 4 June 2009

All 72 of the United Kingdom's seats in the European Parliament
- Turnout: 34.7% ▼3.8%
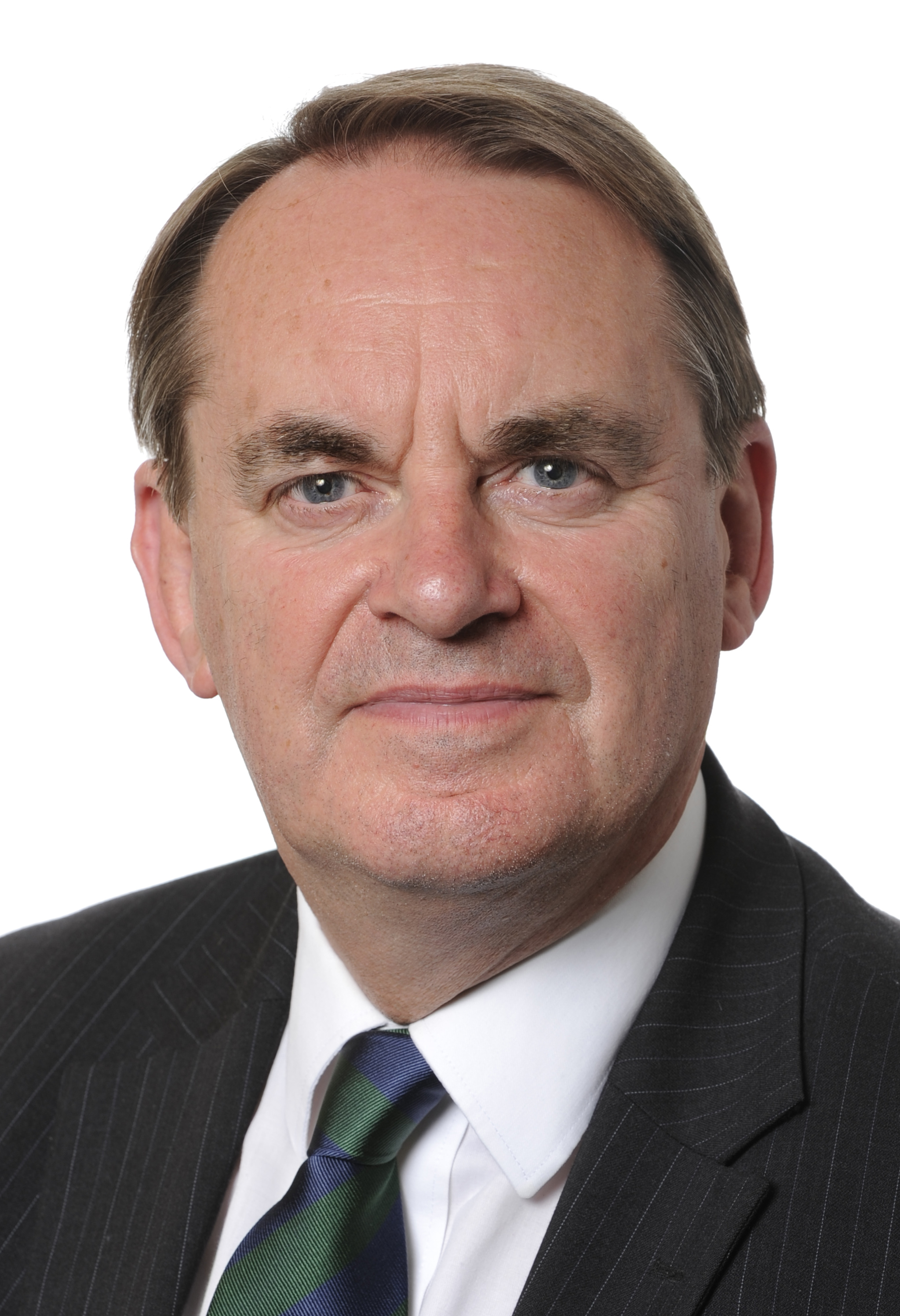

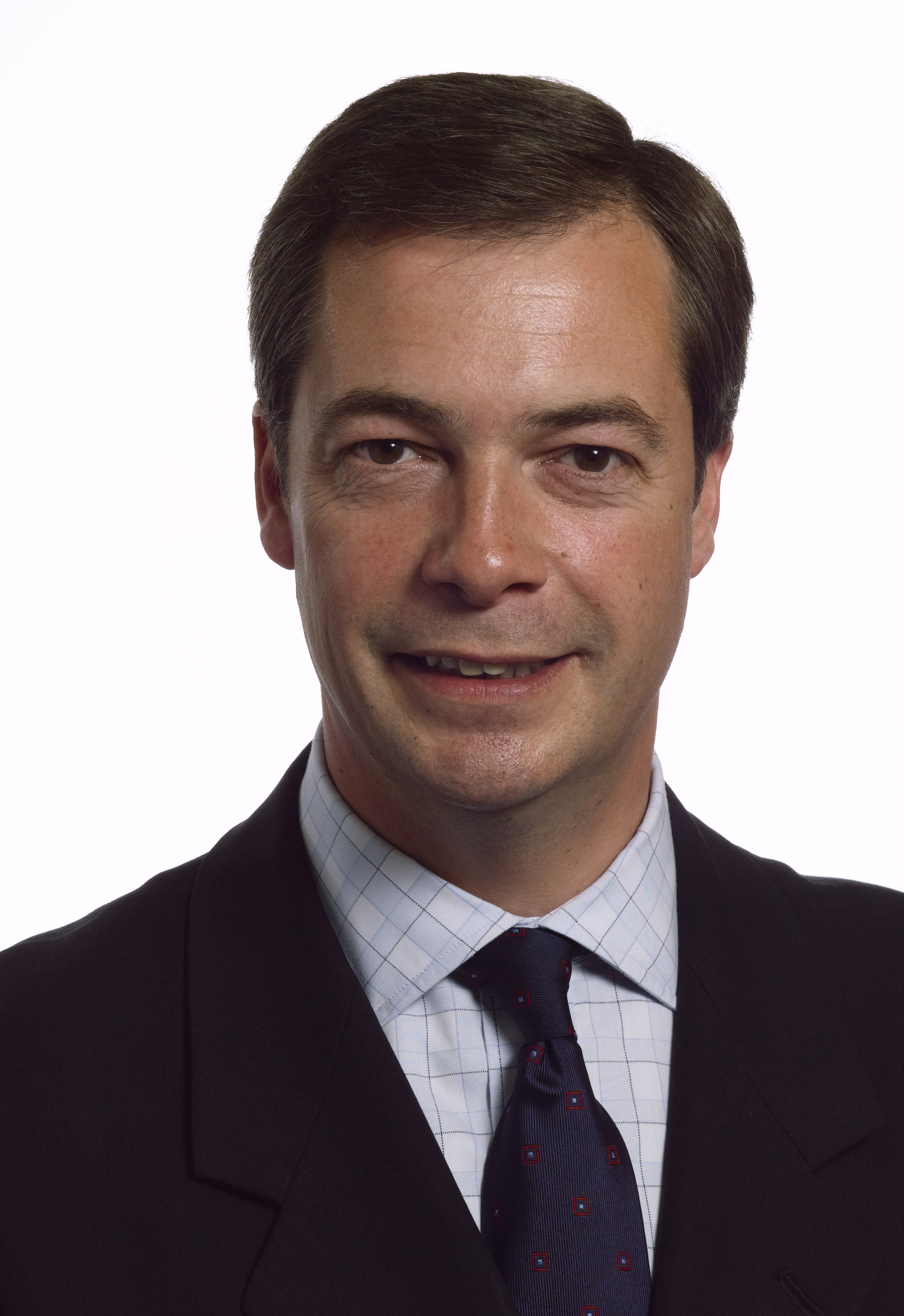

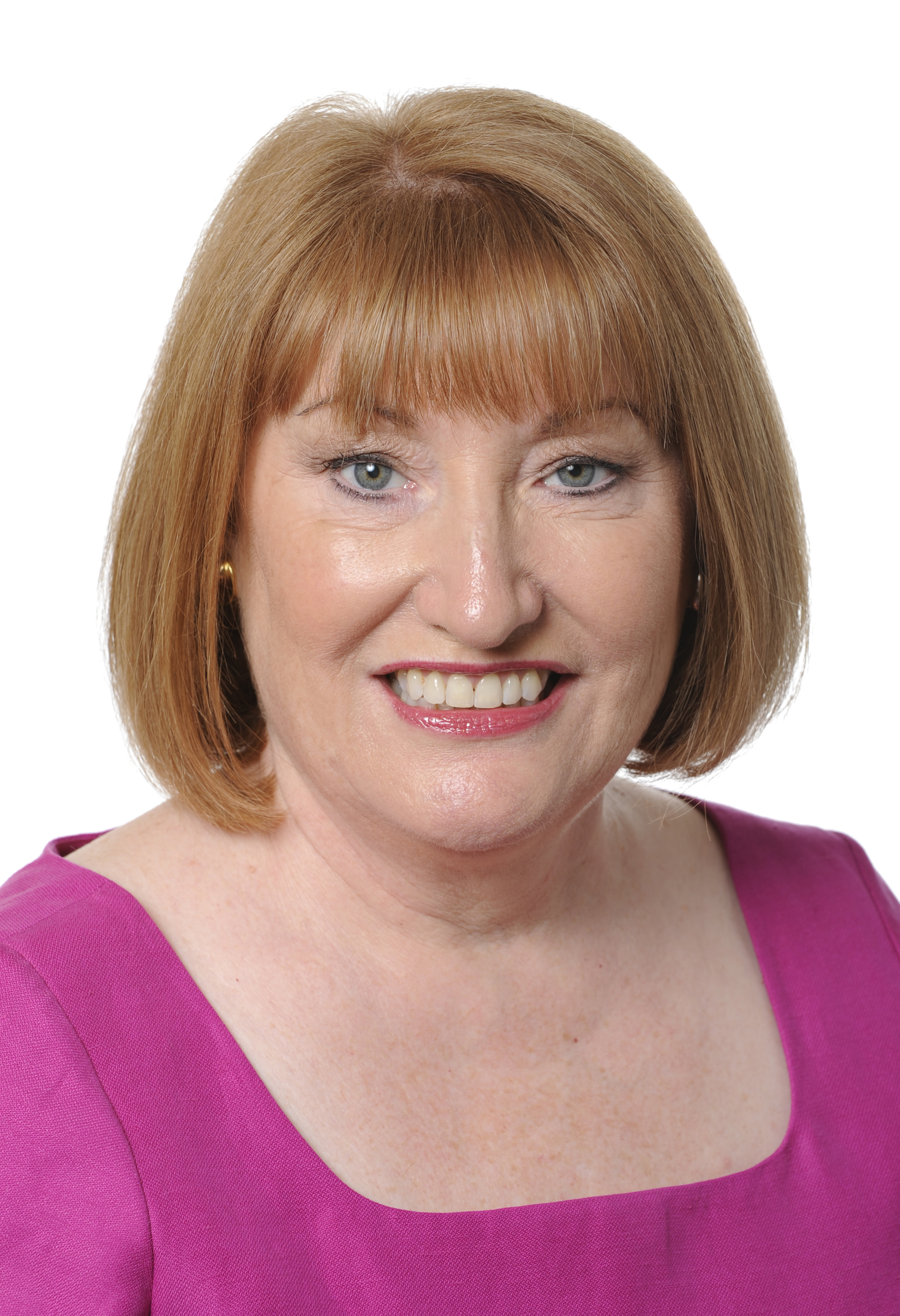

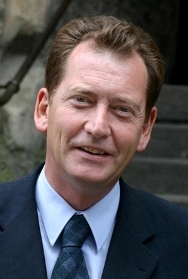

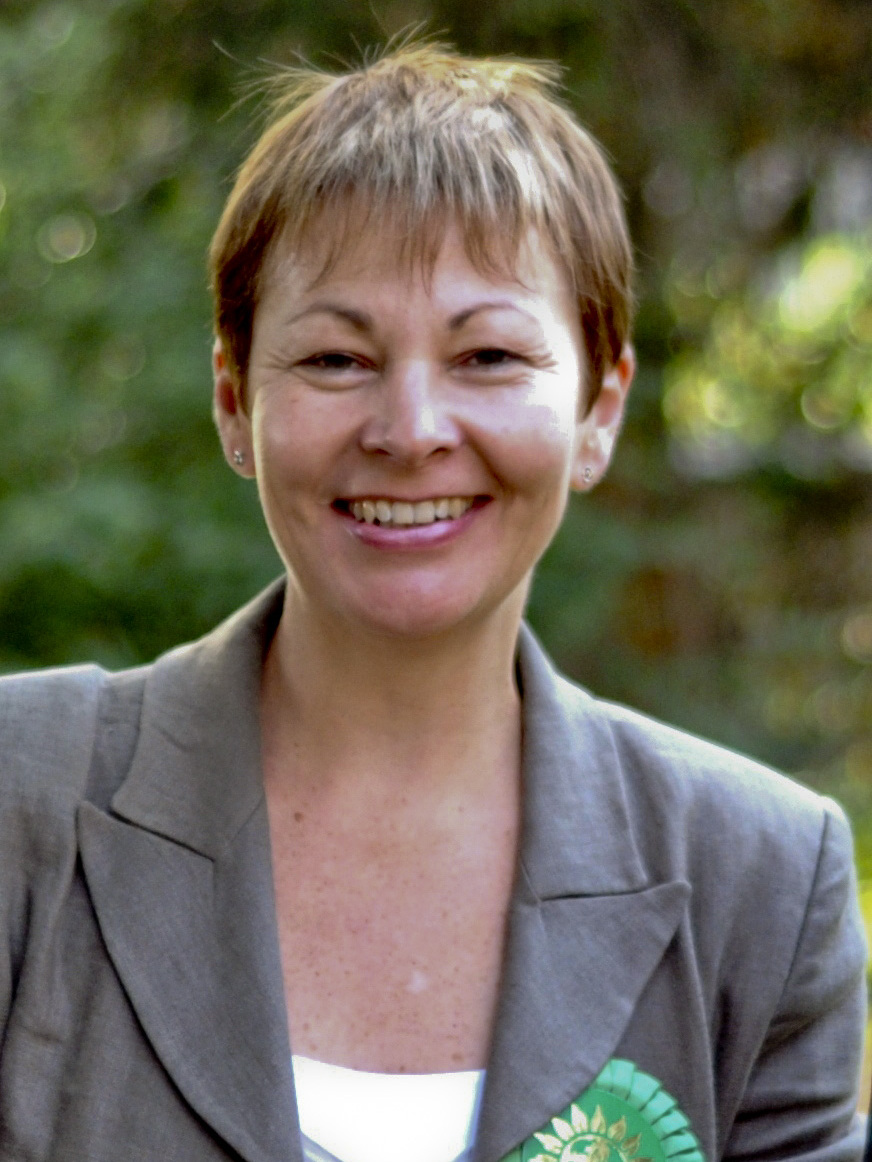

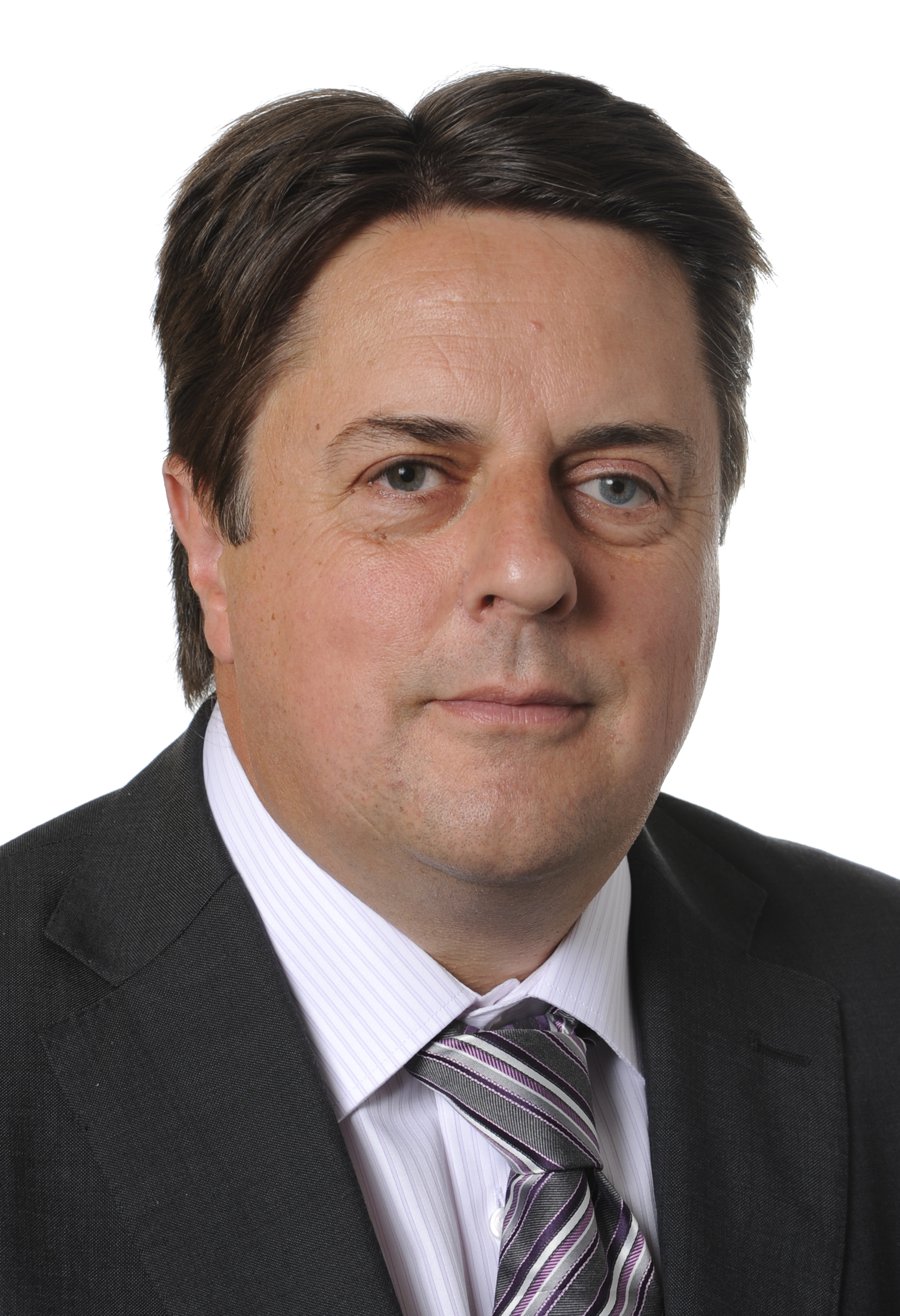

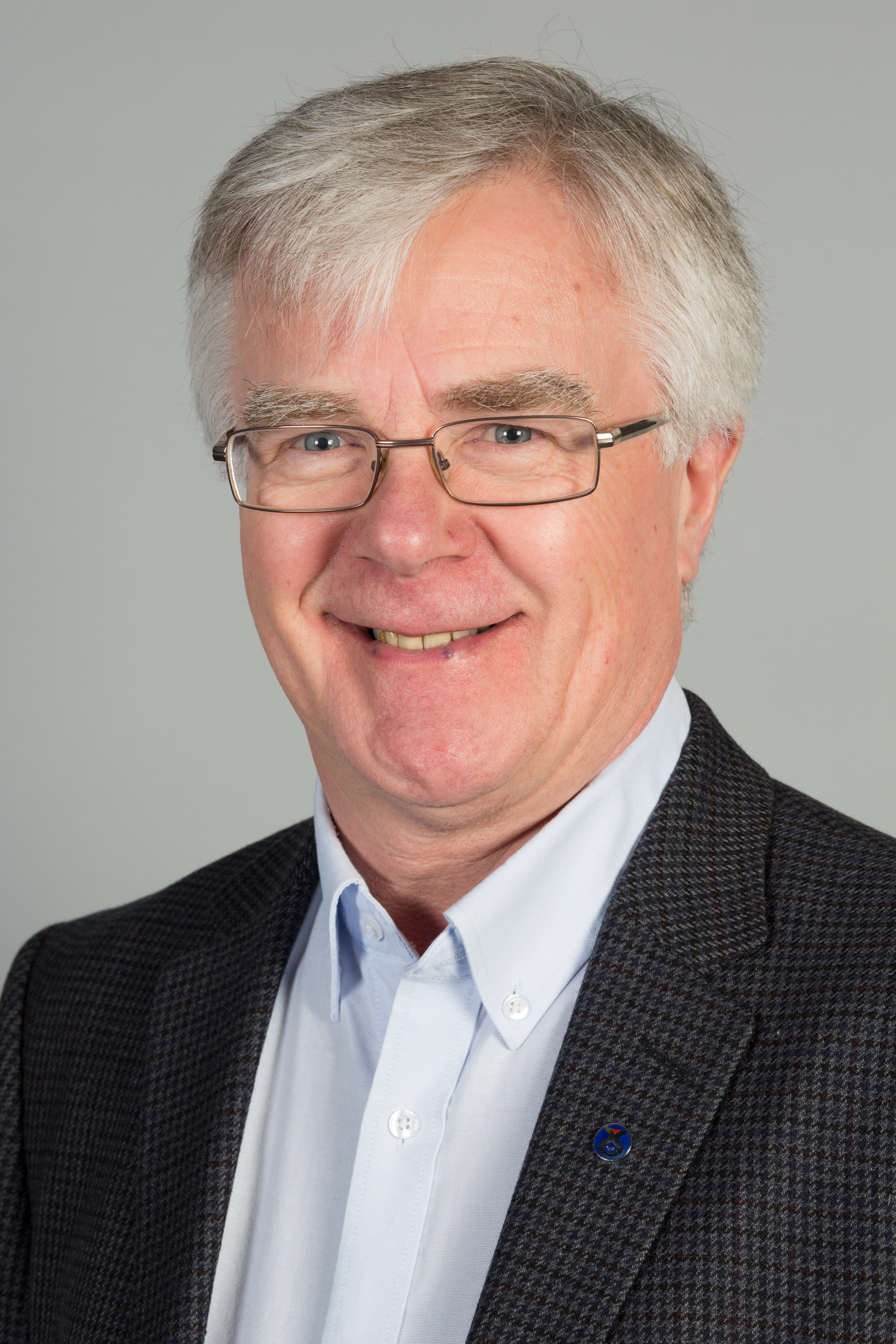
	First party	Second party	Third party
Leader	Timothy Kirkhope	Nigel Farage	Glenis Willmott
Party	Conservative	UKIP	Labour
Alliance	ECR	EFD	S&D
Leader since	18 November 2008	12 September 2006	18 January 2009
Leader's seat	Yorkshire and the Humber	South East England	East Midlands
Last election	27 seats, 25.9%	12 seats, 15.6%	19 seats, 21.9%
Seats before	25 (Note: Notional 2004 results.)	12	18
Seats won	26	13	13
Seat change	▲1*	▲1*	▼5*
Popular vote	4,281,286^{†}	2,498,226	2,381,760
Percentage	27.4%	16.0%	15.2%
Swing	▲1.0%	▲0.4%	▼6.6%
	Fourth party	Fifth party	Sixth party
Leader	Graham Watson	Caroline Lucas (Note: Lucas was the party's national leader.)	Nick Griffin
Party	Liberal Democrats	Green	BNP
Alliance	ALDE	European Greens	NI
Leader since	January 2002	5 September 2008	27 September 1999
Leader's seat	South West England	South East England	Ran in North West England (won)
Last election	12 seats, 14.4%	2 seats, 2.8%	0 seats, 0.0%
Seats before	10	2	0
Seats won	11	2	2
Seat change	▲1*	Steady	▲2*
Popular vote	2,080,613	1,223,303	943,598
Percentage	13.3%	7.8%	6.2%
Swing	▼1.1%	▲2.2%	▲1.3%
	Seventh party
Leader	Ian Hudghton (Note: Hudghton was the SNP's lead candidate.)
Party	SNP
Alliance	European Free Alliance
Leader since	June 1999
Leader's seat	Scotland
Last election	2 seats, 1.4%
Seats before	2
Seats won	2
Seat change	Steady
Popular vote	321,007
Percentage	2.1%
Swing	▲0.7%
- Map of the results indicating the seats won in each region by party *Seat change has been adjusted to allow for direct comparison with the results from the 2004 election.^{†}(including 1 UCUNF)^{‡}Notional results

Leader of Largest Party before election
David Cameron
Conservative
Subsequent Leader of Largest Party
David Cameron
Conservative

The 2009 European Parliament election was the United Kingdom's component of the 2009 European Parliament election, the voting for which was held on Thursday 4 June 2009. The election was held concurrently with the 2009 local elections in England. 72 members of the European Parliament (MEPs) were elected from the United Kingdom using proportional representation.

The election was won by the Conservative Party, who won 27 seats with a share of 27.9% of the national vote. This was the last European election in the United Kingdom at which either the Conservatives or the Labour Party finished in first place. Other notable outcomes were that Labour – which came third – suffered a significant drop in support, and that the UK Independence Party (UKIP) finished second in a major election for the first time in its history, coming level with Labour in terms of seats but ahead of it in terms of votes. This was the first time in British electoral history that a party in government had been outpolled in a national election by a party with no representation in the House of Commons.

The British National Party (BNP) also won two seats, its first ever in a nationwide election. It also marked the first time the Scottish National Party (SNP) won the largest share of the European election vote in Scotland, and the first time Labour had failed to come first in a Welsh election since 1918. It was the Democratic Unionist Party (DUP)'s worst ever European election result, and also the first time an Irish Republican party, Sinn Féin, topped the polls in Northern Ireland.

== Background ==
=== Electoral system ===
The United Kingdom elected 72 members of the European Parliament using proportional representation. It was divided into twelve multi-member constituencies, or regions. The eleven of these regions which form Great Britain used a closed-list party list system method of proportional representation, calculated using the D'Hondt method. Northern Ireland used the single transferable vote (STV).

The experimental use of all-postal ballots in four regions in 2004 was not repeated, resulting in a sharp reduction in turnout in those regions.

=== Constituencies and representation ===
As had been the case since 1999, the electoral constituencies were based on the government's nine English regions, Scotland, Northern Ireland and Wales, creating a total of 12 constituencies. The Treaty of Nice fixed the number of MEPs for the whole European Parliament at 736; as a consequence of the accession of Romania and Bulgaria in 2007, the number of seats allocated to the United Kingdom was reduced from 78 to 72. If the Treaty of Lisbon had entered into force by June 2009, this figure would have been 73.

On 31 July 2007, in line with the required reduction in representation from the United Kingdom, the number of members elected from each region was modified by the Boundary Commission and Electoral Commission, based on the size of the electorate in each region. The recommended changes were approved by the Parliament of the United Kingdom in 2008.

Changes in regional seat allocations

Constituency	Representation in 2004	Representation in 2009	Net gain/loss
East Midlands	6	5	▼1
East of England	7	7	Steady
London	9	8	▼1
North East England	3	3	Steady
North West England	9	8	▼1
Northern Ireland	3	3	Steady
Scotland	7	6	▼1
South East England	10	10	Steady
South West England^{1}	7	6	▼1
Wales	4	4	Steady
West Midlands	7	6	▼1
Yorkshire and the Humber	6	6	Steady
Overall	78	72	▼6

^{1}Includes Gibraltar, the only British overseas territory which was then part of the EU.

=== MEPs retiring ===
Conservative

- Christopher Beazley (East of England)
- John Bowis (London)
- Philip Bushill-Matthews (West Midlands)
- Jonathan Evans (Wales) – Became MP for Cardiff North in 2010
- Chris Heaton-Harris (East Midlands) – Became MP for Daventry in 2010
- Caroline Jackson (South West England)
- Neil Parish (South West England) – Became MP for Tiverton and Honiton in 2010
- John Purvis (Scotland)
- David Sumberg (North West England)

Labour

- Robert Evans (London)
- Glenys Kinnock (Wales)
- Eluned Morgan (Wales)
- Gary Titley (North West England)

UKIP

- Jeffrey Titford (East of England)
- John Whittaker (North West England)
- Roger Knapman (South West England)

Liberal Democrat

- Elspeth Attwooll (Scotland)
- Emma Nicholson (South East England)

Independents

- Den Dover (North West England) – former Conservative MEP, expelled over his expenses
- Robert Kilroy-Silk (East Midlands) – former UKIP MEP, created new party Veritas
- Ashley Mote (South East England) – former UKIP MEP, expelled for expenses fraud for which he was later jailed
- Tom Wise (East of England) – former UKIP MEP, expelled for expenses fraud for which he was later jailed

== Opinion polls ==
In the run up to the election, several polling organisations carried out public opinion polling in regards to voting intentions in Great Britain. Results of such polls are displayed below.

ComRes, ICM, Populus and YouGov are members of the British Polling Council, and abide by its disclosure rules. BPIX is not a member of the BPC, and does not publish detailed methodology and findings.

Date(s) conducted	Polling organisation/client	Con	Lab	UKIP	Lib Dem	Green	BNP	Others	Lead
4 June 2009	EU Election, 2009 (GB Result)	27.7%	15.7%	16.5%	13.7%	8.6%	6.2%	11.6%	11.2%
03/06/09	YouGov/Daily Telegraph	26%	16%	18%	15%	10%	5%	10%	8%
31/05/09	ComRes/Green Party	24%	22%	17%	14%	15%	2%	6%	2%
29/05/09	YouGov/Daily Telegraph	27%	17%	16%	15%	9%	7%	9%	10%
28/05/09	ICM/Sunday Telegraph	29%	17%	10%	20%	11%	5%	8%	9%
28/05/09	Populus/Times	30%	16%	19%	12%	10%	5%	8%	11%
21/05/09	ICM/Guardian	30%	24%	10%	18%	9%	1%	8%	6%
16/05/09	YouGov/Daily Telegraph	28%	22%	15%	17%	7%	5%	5%	6%
14/05/09	ComRes/UKIP	28%	23%	15%	14%	11%	4%	5%	5%
14/05/09	YouGov/Sun	29%	20%	15%	19%	6%	3%	6%	9%
10/05/09	Populus/Times	34%	25%	6%	20%	5%	2%	8%	9%
08/05/09	YouGov/Sunday Times	36%	25%	7%	20%	4%	4%	7%	11%
04/05/09	ICM/TPA	32%	28%	9%	22%	1%	1%	7%	4%
08/01/09	YouGov/TPA	35%	29%	7%	15%	5%	4%	5%	6%
10 June 2004	EU Election, 2004 (GB results only)	26.7%	22.6%	16.1%	14.9%	6.3%	4.9%	8.5%	4.1%

== Results ==
=== United Kingdom ===
Party	Votes			Seats		
Party	Number	%	+/-	Seats	+/-^{‡}	%
Conservative^{†}	4,281,286	27.4	▲1.0	26	▲1	36.1
UKIP	2,498,226	16.0	▲0.4	13	▲1	18.1
Labour	2,381,760	15.2	▼6.6	13	▼5	18.1
Liberal Democrats	2,080,613	13.3	▼1.1	11	▲1	15.3
Green (E&W)	1,223,303	7.8	▲2.2	2	Steady	2.8
BNP	943,598	6.2	▲1.3	2	▲2	2.8
SNP	321,007	2.1	▲0.7	2	Steady	2.8
English Democrat	279,801	1.8	▲1.0	0	Steady	
Christian/CPA^{1}	249,493	1.6	▲1.3	0	Steady	
Socialist Labour	173,115	1.1	New	0	Steady	
No2EU – Yes to Democracy	153,236	1.0	New	0	Steady	
Plaid Cymru	126,702	0.8	▼0.1	1	Steady	1.4
Sinn Féin	126,184	0.8	Steady	1	Steady	1.4
DUP	88,346	0.6	▼0.5	1	Steady	1.4
Green (Scot.)	80,442	0.5	Steady	0	Steady	
Jury Team	78,569	0.5	New	0	Steady	
SDLP	78,489	0.5	Steady	0	Steady	
UK First	74,007	0.5	New	0	Steady	
Libertas	73,544	0.5	New	0	Steady	
TUV	66,197	0.4	New	0	Steady	
Jan Jananayagam (Ind.)	50,014	0.3	New	0	Steady	
Pensioners	37,785	0.2	Steady	0	Steady	
Alliance	26,699	0.2	New	0	Steady	
Green (NI)	15,764	0.1	▲0.1	0	Steady	
Mebyon Kernow	14,922	0.1	New	0	Steady	
Animal Welfare	13,201	0.1	New	0	Steady	
Scottish Socialist	10,404	0.1	▼0.3	0	Steady	
Duncan Robertson (Ind.)	10,189	0.1	New	0	Steady	
Peter Rigby (Ind.)	9,916	0.1	New	0	Steady	
Peace	9,534	0.1	Steady	0	Steady	
Katie Hopkins (Ind.)	8,971	0.1	New	0	Steady	
Fair Play Fair Trade Party	7,151	0.0	New	0	Steady	
Roman Party	5,450	0.0	New	0	Steady	
Steven Cheung (Ind.)	4,918	0.0	New	0	Steady	
Socialist (GB)	4,050	0.0	New	0	Steady	
Francis Apaloo (Ind.)	3,621	0.0	New	0	Steady	
Yes 2 Europe	3,384	0.0	New	0	Steady	
Sohale Rahman (Ind.)	3,248	0.0	New	0	Steady	
Gene Alcantara (Ind.)	1,972	0.0	New	0	Steady	
Haroon Saad (Ind.)	1,603	0.0	New	0	Steady	
Wai D	789	0.0	New	0	Steady	
Total	15,621,503			72	▼6	100

^{†}Includes Ulster Conservatives and Unionists (82,892 votes, 1 MEP).

^{‡} As the number of seats was reduced, these are notional changes estimated by the BBC.

^{1}Joint ticket, ran in England as: The Christian Party - Christian Peoples Alliance.

Vote share
Conservative	27.4%
UK Independence	16.0%
Labour	15.2%
Liberal Democrat	13.3%
Green	7.8%
British National	6.0%
Scottish National	2.1%
English Democrats	1.8%
Christian Peoples	1.6%
Socialist Labour	1.1%
No2EU	1.0%
Plaid Cymru	0.8%
Sinn Féin	0.8%
Democratic Unionist	0.6%
Others	4.5%

Seats
Conservative	36.1%
UK Independence	18.1%
Labour	18.1%
Liberal Democrat	15.3%
Green	2.8%
British National	2.8%
Scottish National	2.8%
Plaid Cymru	1.4%
Sinn Féin	1.4%
Democratic Unionist	1.4%

=== Great Britain ===
Map showing most popular party by counting area (in Great Britain)

Turnout in Great Britain was 34.3%, with 15,137,202 votes out of a total electorate of 44,171,778. Most of the results of the election were announced on Sunday 7 June, after similar elections were held in the other 26 member states of the European Union. Scotland declared its result on Monday 8 June, as counting in the Western Isles was delayed due to observance of the Sabbath.

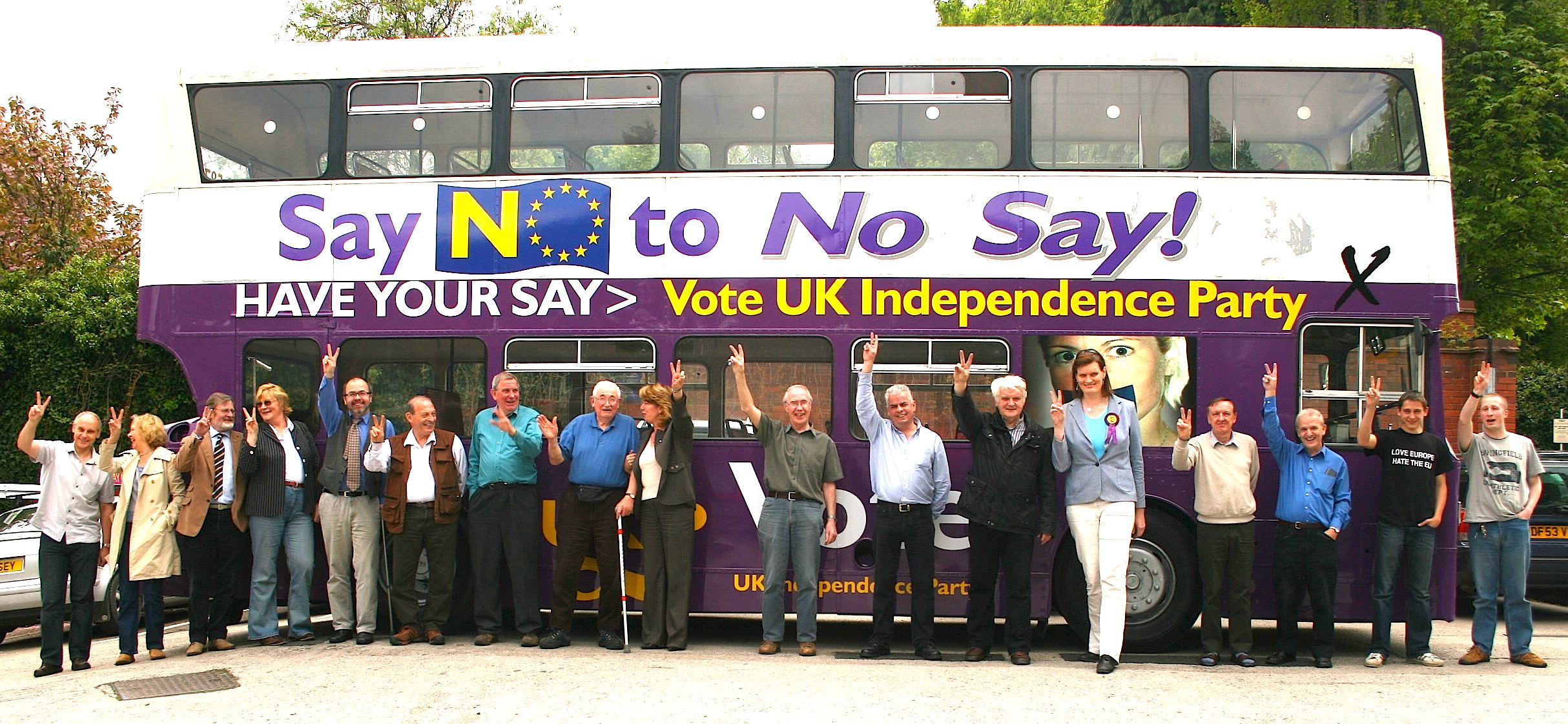
UKIP activists in Walsall

Great Britain kept to the Europe-wide trend towards the right. The Labour Party, which was in its twelfth year of government of the United Kingdom, polled third and suffered a significant drop in support; UKIP finished second in a major election for the first time in its history, coming level with Labour in terms of seats but ahead of it in terms of votes. This was the first time in British electoral history that a party in government had been outpolled in a national election by a party with no representation in the House of Commons.

The Conservatives won in every region in Great Britain except the North East, where Labour won, and Scotland, where the SNP won. Labour suffered most notably in Cornwall, where it came sixth behind Mebyon Kernow, and in the wider South West region and South East, where it polled fifth behind the Green Party. The British National Party won two seats, its first ever in a national election. The share of the vote achieved by the English Democrats doubled.

The turnout in Scotland was the lowest in the United Kingdom at 28.8%, with 1,104,512 votes out of a total electorate of 3,872,975. In Scotland it was the first time the SNP won the largest share of the European election vote. The SNP share of the vote rose by 9.4% points compared to 2004; this was the biggest positive swing for any party in any region in Great Britain.

In Wales it was the first time since 1918 that Labour had failed to come first in a Welsh election, dropping 12.2%. In Wales the Conservative Party topped the poll, with the nationalist Plaid Cymru coming a close third. UKIP took the fourth Welsh seat, the first time Wales had elected a UKIP MEP. Both the Liberal Democrats and the Green Party polled their lowest regional shares in Wales, though Wales was the only region where the Liberal Democrat share of the vote rose compared with 2004.

Summary of the election results for Great Britain

Party	Votes won	% of vote	% Plus/ minus	Seats	Plus/minus vs actual '04 result	Plus/minus vs notional '04 result†	Seats %
Conservative	4,198,394	27.7%	▲1.0	25	▼2	▲1	37.7
UKIP	2,498,226	16.5%	▲0.4	13	▲1	▲1	18.8
Labour	2,381,760	15.7%	▼6.9	13	▼6	▼5	18.8
Liberal Democrats	2,080,613	13.7%	▼1.2	11	▼1	▲1	15.9
Green	1,223,303	8.1%	▲2.3	2	Steady	Steady	2.9
BNP	943,598	6.2%	▲1.3	2	▲2	▲2	2.9
SNP	321,007	2.1%	▲0.7	2	Steady	Steady	2.9
English Democrat	279,801	1.8%	▲1.1	0	Steady	Steady	0
Christian/Christian Peoples Alliance^{1}	249,493	1.6%	▲1.3	0	Steady	Steady	0
Socialist Labour	173,115	1.1%	New	0	Steady	Steady	0
No2EU – Yes to Democracy	153,236	1.0%	New	0	Steady	Steady	0
Plaid Cymru	126,702	0.8%	▼0.1	1	Steady	Steady	1.4
Green	80,442	0.5%	Steady	0	Steady	Steady	0
Jury Team	78,569	0.5%	New	0	Steady	Steady	0
UK First	74,007	0.5%	New	0	Steady	Steady	0
Libertas	73,544	0.5%	New	0	Steady	Steady	0
Jan Jananayagam (Independent)	50,014	0.3%	New	0	Steady	Steady	0
Pensioners	37,785	0.2%	Steady	0	Steady	Steady	0
Mebyon Kernow	14,922	0.1%	New	0	Steady	Steady	0
Animal Welfare	13,201	0.1%	New	0	Steady	Steady	0
Scottish Socialist	10,404	0.1%	▼0.3	0	Steady	Steady	0
Duncan Robertson (Independent)	10,189	0.1%	New	0	Steady	Steady	0
Peter Rigby (Independent)	9,916	0.1%	New	0	Steady	Steady	0
Peace	9,534	0.1%	Steady	0	Steady	Steady	0
Katie Hopkins (Independent)	8,971	0.1%	New	0	Steady	Steady	0
Fair Play Fair Trade Party	7,151	0.0%	New	0	Steady	Steady	0
Roman Party	5,450	0.0%	New	0	Steady	Steady	0
Steven Cheung (Independent)	4,918	0.0%	New	0	Steady	Steady	0
Socialist (GB)	4,050	0.0%	New	0	Steady	Steady	0
Francis Apaloo (Independent)	3,621	0.0%	New	0	Steady	Steady	0
Yes 2 Europe	3,384	0.0%	New	0	Steady	Steady	0
Sohale Rahman (Independent)	3,248	0.0%	New	0	Steady	Steady	0
Gene Alcantara (Independent)	1,972	0.0%	New	0	Steady	Steady	0
Haroon Saad (Independent)	1,603	0.0%	New	0	Steady	Steady	0
Wai D	789	0.0%	New	0	Steady	Steady	0
Total	15,136,932			69	▼6	Steady	100

†Seat change has been adjusted to allow for direct comparison with the results from the 2004 election.

^{1}Joint ticket, ran in England as The Christian Party - Christian Peoples Alliance.

=== Gibraltar ===
Gibraltar is a British overseas territory (BOT) and therefore is under the jurisdiction and sovereignty of the United Kingdom but does not form part of it. Gibraltar was, however, part of the EU, the only BOT to be so, and participated as part of the South West England constituency.

Turnout was 35% in Gibraltar, below the 39% for the South West England electoral region as a whole and significantly lower than the turnout in Gibraltar in 2004.

The Conservatives won with 53.3% of the votes. Labour narrowly retained second place achieving 19% to the Liberal Democrats' 18.2%.

Party	Votes won	Vote share (%)	Change (%)
Conservative	3,721	53.3	▼16.2
Labour	1,328	19.0	▲9.6
Liberal Democrats	1,269	18.2	▲10.6
Green	224	3.2	▼5.5
UKIP	100	1.4	▲0.3
BNP	94	1.4	▲0.5
Christian	70	1.0	New
Socialist Labour	56	0.8	New
English Democrat	37	0.5	New
Pensioners	26	0.4	New
Independent - Katie Hopkins	15	0.2	New
No2EU – Yes to Democracy	12	0.2	New
Mebyon Kernow	8	0.1	New
Fair Pay Fair Trade	8	0.1	New
Jury Team	6	0.1	New
Wai D Your Decision	4	0.1	New
Libertas	3	0.0	New

=== Northern Ireland ===
Map of Northern Irish results

It was the DUP's worst ever European election result: the party had previously topped the poll in every European election in Northern Ireland since the first one in 1979. It was also the first time an Irish Republican topped the poll, Bairbre de Brún of Sinn Féin coming first with 125,000 votes. The share of the votes for most parties in Northern Ireland remained essentially unchanged, the main exceptions were the DUP where their share of the vote fell by 13.8%, and the TUV, a party created by former DUP MEP Jim Allister whose share of the vote rose 13.7%. The DUP's decreased vote share was largely blamed on the TUV splitting the vote.

Summary of the election results for Northern Ireland

Party	Candidate	Seats	Loss/gain	First preference votes	
Party	Candidate	Seats	Loss/gain	Number	% of vote
Sinn Féin	Bairbre de Brún	1	0	126,184	25.8
DUP	Diane Dodds	1	0	88,346	18.1
UCU-NF	Jim Nicholson	1	0	82,892	17.0
SDLP	Alban Maginness	0	0	78,489	16.1
TUV	Jim Allister	0	0	66,197	13.5
Alliance	Ian Parsley	0	0	26,699	5.5
Green (NI)	Steven Agnew	0	0	15,764	3.2
Turnout				488,891	42.8

=== Incumbents defeated ===
Labour

- Glyn Ford (South West England)
- Neena Gill (West Midlands)
- Richard Corbett (Yorkshire and the Humber)

Traditional Unionist Voice

- Jim Allister (Northern Ireland) – was elected in the 2004 election as a candidate for the DUP; subsequently in 2007 Allister resigned from the DUP and formed the TUV. In the 2009 election, Diane Dodds retook the seat for the DUP.

== Aftermath ==
Gordon Brown faced calls for him to resign as Prime Minister following Labour's defeat.

During the 2005 Conservative leadership election, David Cameron argued for withdrawal of the Conservatives from EPP-ED and for the formation of a new group. After the European election it was announced that the Conservatives were leaving the EPP-ED and forming a new group, the European Conservatives and Reformists. On 22 June 2009, the first official list of the new group's members was released. The group held its inaugural meeting on 24 June, during which Conservative MEP Timothy Kirkhope was named interim leader. The first election for the group leadership was also scheduled for 14 July, pitting interim leader Kirkhope against fellow Briton Geoffrey Van Orden. However, both Conservative leadership candidates were forced to forfeit the leadership in order to prevent the group from collapsing, when then-Conservative MEP Edward McMillan-Scott defied his party whip and stood for one of the vice-presidency posts despite pledges the previous week that Polish MEP Michał Kamiński would be backed for it. Kaminski's bid for Vice-President of the European Parliament subsequently failed, and the Poles threatened to abandon the new caucus unless Kaminski was made the group leader in the parliament.

Similarly, UKIP helped found a new European Parliament Group, Europe of Freedom and Democracy, after the other parties in UKIP's pre-election European parliamentary grouping, Independence/Democracy, had polled badly.

Of the two BNP candidates elected to the European Parliament at the 2009 election, the UK Government announced that it would provide them both with only the bare minimum level of support, denying them the ready access to officials and information that the other 70 British MEPs received.

Summary of the post-election European Parliament groupings of each party

EP group	MEPs	UK party	MEPs
European Conservatives and Reformists	26	Conservative	25
European Conservatives and Reformists	26	Conservatives and Unionists	1
Europe of Freedom and Democracy	13	UKIP	13
Progressive Alliance of Socialists and Democrats	13	Labour	13
Alliance of Liberals and Democrats for Europe	11	Liberal Democrats	11
Greens–European Free Alliance	5	Green Party of England and Wales	2
Greens–European Free Alliance	5	Scottish National Party	2
Greens–European Free Alliance	5	Plaid Cymru	1
European United Left-Nordic Green Left	1	Sinn Féin	1
Non-Inscrits	3	British National Party	2
Non-Inscrits	3	Democratic Unionist	1

== See also ==
- 2009 European Parliament election
- Members of the European Parliament for the United Kingdom 2009–2014 (alphabetic order)
- Treaty of Lisbon
- 2009 United Kingdom local elections
- 2010 United Kingdom general election
- Opinion polling for the 2010 United Kingdom general election
