= Electoral history of Nigel Farage =

Elections featuring British politician

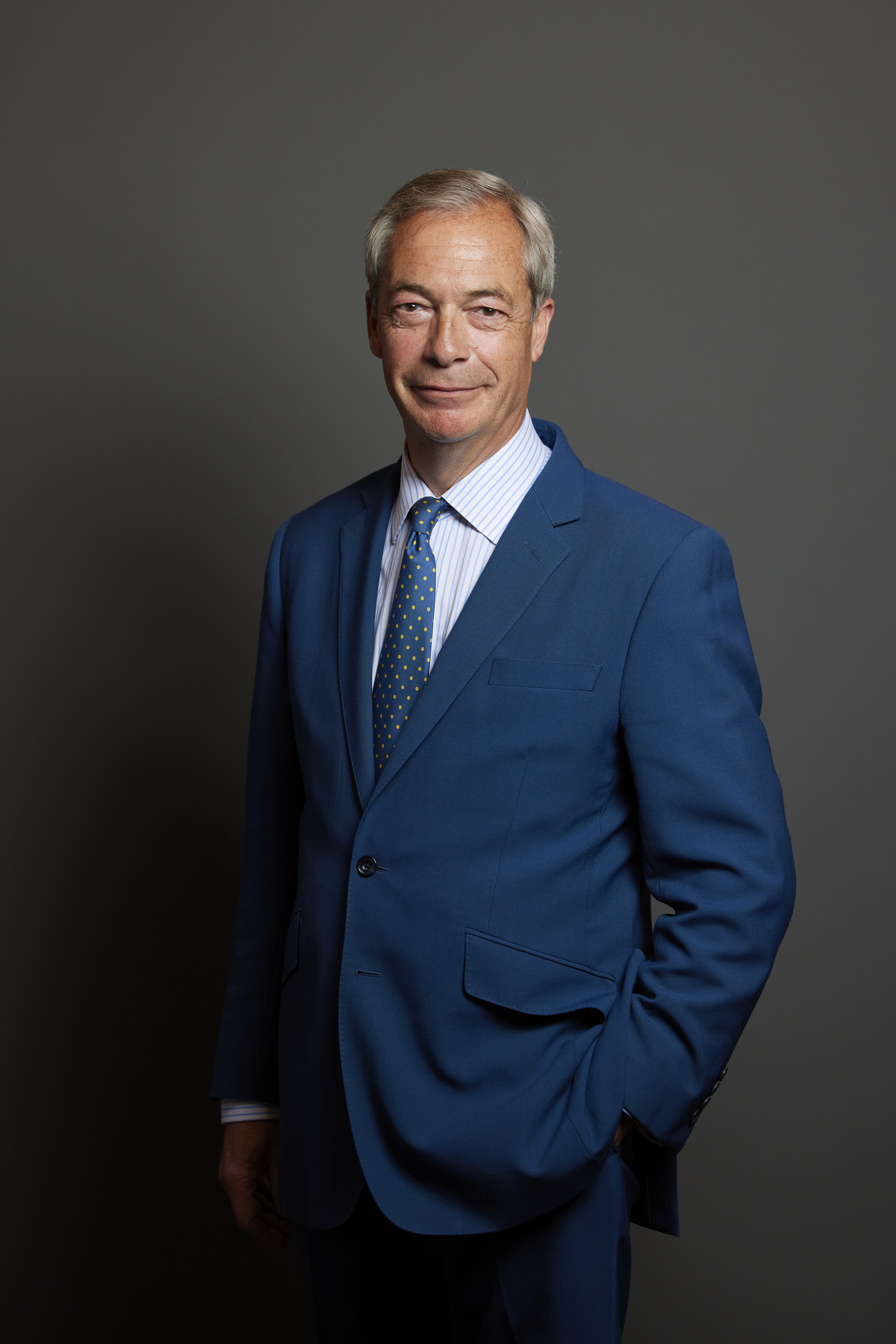
Nigel Farage

Nigel Farage is a British MP for Clacton and former MEP for South East England who has stood as a candidate representing eurosceptic parties UK Independence Party (UKIP) and Reform UK (Note: Known as the Brexit Party from 2018 to 2021) since 1994. He was a Member of the European Parliament representing South East England from the 1999 election until the British withdrawal from the European Union in 2020, winning re-election four times. Farage has stood for election to the House of Commons nine times, in six general elections and three by-elections, losing in every attempt until 2024 in Clacton. He was also a proponent of the UK leaving the European Union in the 2016 referendum, in which the electorate voted to do so by 52% to 48%.

Farage was voted UKIP leader in the September 2006 leadership election, and led them in the 2009 European Parliament election in which his party won the second-highest number of votes and seats after the Conservative Party. He resigned as leader later that year in order to concentrate on the 2010 general election. In late 2010, he was voted leader for a second time following the resignation of Lord Pearson of Rannoch. Farage led UKIP in the 2014 European Parliament election, in which his party won the most votes and seats; this was the first time since the December 1910 general election that Labour or the Conservatives did not get the most seats in a British nationwide election. He resigned as UKIP leader after the 2016 referendum.

The first election to the House of Commons that Farage contested was the 1994 Eastleigh by-election. After standing unsuccessfully for election in the next three general elections, all in a different constituency, he stood in the 2006 Bromley and Chislehurst by-election, in which he finished third with 8.1% of the vote. In the 2010 general election, Farage stood against the Speaker of the House of Commons, John Bercow, in the constituency of Buckingham, again finishing third with 17.4% of the vote. Five years later, he stood in the general election in the constituency of South Thanet, finishing second to the Conservative Craig Mackinlay, with 32.4% of the vote. He did not stand as a candidate for election in the 2019 general election. In 2024, Farage became Leader of Reform UK once more, ahead of the that year's general election, and won election for Parliament in Clacton.

In 2026, Farage unexpectedly resigned as MP for Clacton, declaring that 'the people of Clacton' would act as his judge in the matter of the parliamentary investigation into the possibility that Farage had received (or benefitted from) political donations in secret. In the following by-election, none of the major parties stood candidates. Farage was re-elected with a vote total comparable to his 2024 total. His main opponent, the political satirist Count Binface, received 9,455 votes, more than Farage had received in his six attempts at election (as an MP) prior to 2015. The parliamentary investigation into Farage's political donations was suspended for the Clacton by-election but has since resumed.

== Summary ==
UK Parliament elections

Date of election	Constituency	Party	Votes	%	Result
1994 by-election	Eastleigh	UKIP	952	1.7	Not elected
1997 general election	Salisbury	UKIP	3,332	5.7	Not elected
2001 general election	Bexhill and Battle	UKIP	3,474	7.8	Not elected
2005 general election	South Thanet	UKIP	2,079	5.0	Not elected
2006 by-election	Bromley and Chislehurst	UKIP	2,347	8.1	Not elected
2010 general election	Buckingham	UKIP	8,410	17.4	Not elected
2015 general election	South Thanet	UKIP	16,026	32.4	Not elected
2024 general election	Clacton	Reform	21,225	46.2	Elected
2026 by-election	Clacton	Reform	22,239	63.34	Elected

European Parliament elections

Date of election	Constituency	Party	Votes	%	Result
1994 European election	Itchen, Test and Avon	UKIP	12,423	5.4	Not elected
1999 European election	South East England	UKIP	144,514	9.7	Elected
2004 European election	South East England	UKIP	431,111	19.5	Elected
2009 European election	South East England	UKIP	440,002	18.8	Elected
2014 European election	South East England	UKIP	751,439	32.1	Elected
2019 European election	South East England	Brexit Party	915,686	36.07	Elected

UKIP leadership elections

Date of election	Votes	%	Result
2006 leadership election	3,239	45.0	Elected
2010 leadership election	6,085	60.5	Elected

== Elections to the House of Commons ==
Elections to the House of Commons are decided by first-past-the-post voting. Each voter votes for one candidate, and the candidate who receives the most votes in each constituency becomes a Member of Parliament.

Eastleigh by-election, 1994
Party	Candidate	Votes	%	±%
Liberal Democrats	David Chidgey	24,473	44.3	+16.3
Labour	Marilyn Birks	15,234	27.6	+6.8
Conservative	Stephen Reid	13,675	24.7	−26.5
UKIP	Nigel Farage	952	1.7	N/A
Monster Raving Loony	David Sutch	783	1.4	N/A
Natural Law	Peter Warburton	145	0.3	N/A
Majority		9,239	16.7	
Turnout		55,262	58.7	−24.2
Liberal Democrats gain from Conservative		Swing	−16.8	

General election 1997: Salisbury
Party	Candidate	Votes	%	±%
Conservative	Robert Key	25,012	43.0	−9.0
Liberal Democrats	Yvonne Emmerson-Peirce	18,736	32.2	−5.0
Labour	Ricky Rogers	10,242	17.6	+8.6
UKIP	Nigel Farage	3,332	5.7	N/A
Green	Hamish Soutar	623	1.1	+0.1
Independent	William Holmes	184	0.3	N/A
Natural Law	Shirley Haysom	110	0.2	0.0
Majority		6,276	10.8	
Turnout		58,239	73.6	
Conservative hold		Swing	−2.0	

General election 2001: Bexhill and Battle
Party	Candidate	Votes	%	±%
Conservative	Gregory Barker	21,555	48.1	0.0
Liberal Democrats	Stephen Philip Hardy	11,052	24.7	−0.8
Labour	Anne Elizabeth Moore-Williams	8,702	19.4	+1.3
UKIP	Nigel Farage	3,474	7.8	+6.2
Majority		10,503	23.4	
Turnout		44,783	64.9	−9.6
Conservative hold		Swing	+0.4	

General election 2005: South Thanet
Party	Candidate	Votes	%	±%
Labour	Stephen Ladyman	16,660	40.4	−5.3
Conservative	Mark MacGregor	15,996	38.8	−2.3
Liberal Democrats	Guy Voizey	5,431	13.2	+3.8
UKIP	Nigel Farage	2,079	5.0	+3.7
Green	Howard Green	888	2.2	+2.2
Independent	Maude Kinsella	188	0.5	+0.5
Majority		664	1.6	
Turnout		41,242	65	1.1
Labour hold		Swing	−1.5	

Bromley and Chislehurst by-election, 2006
Party	Candidate	Votes	%	±%
Conservative	Bob Neill	11,621	40.0	−11.1
Liberal Democrats	Ben Abbotts	10,988	37.8	+17.5
UKIP	Nigel Farage	2,347	8.1	+4.9
Labour	Rachel Reeves	1,925	6.6	−15.6
Green	Ann Garrett	811	2.8	−0.4
National Front	Paul Winnett	476	1.6	N/A
Independent	John Hemming-Clark	442	1.5	N/A
English Democrat	Steven Uncles	212	0.7	N/A
Monster Raving Loony	John Cartwright	132	0.5	N/A
Independent	Nick Hadziannis	65	0.2	N/A
Money Reform	Anne Belsey	33	0.1	N/A
Majority		633	2.2	−26.7
Turnout		29,052	40.18	−24.68
Conservative hold		Swing	14.3%	

General election 2010: Buckingham
Party	Candidate	Votes	%	±%
Speaker	John Bercow	22,860	47.3	N/A
Buckinghamshire Campaign for Democracy	John Stevens	10,331	21.4	N/A
UKIP	Nigel Farage	8,410	17.4	+14.4
Independent	Patrick Phillips	2,394	5.0	N/A
Independent	Debbie Martin	1,270	2.6	N/A
BNP	Lynne Mozar	980	2.0	N/A
Monster Raving Loony	Colin Dale	856	1.8	N/A
Independent	Geoff Howard	435	0.9	N/A
Christian	David Hews	369	0.8	N/A
Independent	Anthony Watts	332	0.7	N/A
Cut The Deficit	Simon Strutt	107	0.2	N/A
Majority		12,529	25.9	
Turnout		48,344	64.5	−3.8
Speaker hold		Swing	N/A	

General election 2015: South Thanet
Party	Candidate	Votes	%	±%
Conservative	Craig Mackinlay	18,838	38.1	−9.9
UKIP	Nigel Farage	16,026	32.4	+26.9
Labour	Will Scobie	11,740	23.8	−7.6
Green	Ian Driver	1,076	2.2	N/A
Liberal Democrats	Russell Timpson	932	1.9	−13.2
No description	Al Murray	318	0.6	N/A
Manston Airport Independent	Ruth Bailey	191	0.4	N/A
We Are The Reality Party	Nigel Askew	126	0.3	N/A
Party for a United Thanet	Grahame Birchall	63	0.1	N/A
Independent	Dean McCastree	61	0.1	N/A
Al-Zebabist Nation of Ooog	Robert George Zebadiah Abu-Obadiah	30	0.05	N/A
Majority		2,812	5.7	−10.9
Turnout		49,401	70.4	+5.1
Conservative hold		Swing	−18.4	

General election 2024: Clacton
Party	Candidate	Votes	%	±%
Reform	Nigel Farage	21,225	46.2	New
Conservative	Giles Watling	12,820	27.9	−44.0
Labour	Jovan Owusu-Nepaul	7,448	16.2	0.6
Liberal Democrats	Matthew Bensilum	2,016	4.4	−1.8
Green	Natasha Osben	1,935	4.2	1.3
Independent	Tony Mack	317	0.7	New
UKIP	Andrew Pemberton	116	0.3	New
Climate	Craig Jamieson	48	0.1	New
Heritage	Tasos Papanastasiou	33	0.1	New
Majority		8,405		
Turnout			58	−1.7
Reform gain from Conservative		Swing		

== Elections to the European Parliament ==
Up to and including the 1994 election, British elections to the European Parliament used the first-past-the-post system.

European Election 1994: Itchen, Test and Avon
Party	Candidate	Votes	%
Conservative	Edward Kellett-Bowman	81,456	35.4
Liberal Democrats	A.D. Barron	74,553	32.4
Labour	E.V. Read	52,416	22.7
UKIP	Nigel Farage	12,423	5.4
Green	F. Hulbert	7,998	3.5
Natural Law	A.D. Miller-Smith	1,368	0.6
Total votes		550,406	100.0
Turnout			41.8
Conservative win (new seat)			

From 1999, all British elections to the European Parliament were done by a proportional representation system, in which each voter votes for one party in their constituency. The seats allotted for the constituency were then divided between the parties depending on their share of the vote.

Elected candidates are named. Brackets indicate the number of votes per seat won.

European Election 1999: South East England
List	Candidates	Votes	Of total (%)	± from prev.
Conservative	James Provan, Roy Perry, Daniel Hannan, James Elles, Nirj Deva	661,932 (132,386.4)	44.4	N/A
Labour	Peter Skinner, Mark F. Watts	292,146 (146,073)	19.6	N/A
Liberal Democrats	Baroness Nicholson of Winterbourne, Chris Huhne	228,136 (114,068)	15.3	N/A
UKIP	Nigel Farage	144,514	9.7	N/A
Green	Caroline Lucas	110,571	7.4	N/A
Pro-Euro Conservative		27,305	1.8	N/A
BNP		12,161	0.8	N/A
Socialist Labour		7,281	0.5	N/A
Natural Law		2,767	0.2	N/A
Open Democracy for Stability		1,857	0.1	N/A
Making a Profit in Europe		1,400	0.1	N/A
Turnout		1,490,069	24.7	N/A

European Election 2004: South East England
List	Candidates	Votes	Of total (%)	± from prev.
Conservative	Daniel Hannan, Nirj Deva, James Elles, Richard Ashworth	776,370 (194,092.5)	35.2	−9.2
UKIP	Nigel Farage, Ashley Mote	431,111 (215,555.5)	19.5	+9.8
Liberal Democrats	Chris Huhne, Baroness Nicholson of Winterbourne	338,342 (169,171)	15.3	0
Labour	Peter Skinner	301,398	13.7	−5.9
Green	Caroline Lucas	173,351	7.9	+0.5
BNP		64,877	2.9	+2.1
Senior Citizens		42,861	1.9	N/A
English Democrat		29,126	1.3	N/A
Respect		13,426	0.9	N/A
Peace		12,572	0.6	N/A
CPA		11,733	0.5	N/A
ProLife Alliance		6,579	0.3	N/A
Independent		5,671	0.3	N/A
Turnout		2,207,417	36.5	+11.8

European Election 2009: South East England
List	Candidates	Votes	Of total (%)	± from prev.
Conservative	Daniel Hannan, Richard Ashworth, Nirj Deva, James Elles	812,288 (203,072)	34.8	−0.4
UKIP	Nigel Farage, Marta Andreasen	440,002 (220,001)	18.8	−0.7
Liberal Democrats	Sharon Bowles, Catherine Bearder	330,340 (165,170)	14.1	−1.2
Green	Caroline Lucas	271,506	11.6	+3.8
Labour	Peter Skinner	192,592	8.2	−5.4
BNP		101,769	4.4	+1.4
English Democrat		52,526	2.2	+0.9
Christian		35,712	1.5	N/A
NO2EU		21,455	0.9	N/A
Libertas		16,767	0.7	N/A
Socialist Labour		15,484	0.7	N/A
UK First		15,261	0.7	N/A
Jury Team		14,172	0.6	N/A
Peace		9,534	0.4	−0.2
Roman Party		5,450	0.2	N/A
Turnout		2,334,858	37.5	+1.0

European Election 2014: South East England
List	Candidates	Votes	Of total (%)	± from prev.
UKIP	Nigel Farage, Janice Atkinson, Diane James, Ray Finch	751,439 (187,860)	32.14	+13.29
Conservative	Daniel Hannan, Nirj Deva, Richard Ashworth	723,571 (241,190)	30.95	−3.84
Labour	Anneliese Dodds	342,775	14.66	+6.41
Green	Keith Taylor	211,706	9.05	−2.57
Liberal Democrats	Catherine Bearder	187,876	8.04	−6.11
An Independence from Europe		45,199	1.93	N/A
English Democrat		17,771	0.76	−1.49
BNP		16,909	0.72	−3.64
CPA		14,893	0.64	−0.89
Peace		10,130	0.43	+0.02
Socialist (GB)		5,454	0.23	N/A
Roman Party		2,997	0.13	−0.11
YOURvoice		2.932	N/A	N/A
Liberty GB		2,494	0.13	N/A
Harmony Party		1,904	0.08	N/A
Turnout		2,348,168	36.5%	−1%

European Election 2019: South East England
List	Candidates	Votes	Of total (%)	± from prev.
Brexit Party	Nigel Farage, Alexandra Lesley Phillips, Robert Andrew Rowland, Belinda Claire De Camborne Lucy, James Gilbert Bartholomew	915,686 (228,921.5)	36.07	N/A
Liberal Democrats	Catherine Bearder, Antony Hook, Judith Bunting	653,743	25.75	+17.71
Green	Alexandra Phillips	343,249	13.52	+4.46
Conservative	Daniel Hannan	260,277	10.25	−20.70
Labour	John Howarth	184,678	7.27	−7.39
Change UK		105,832	4.17	N/A
UKIP		56,487	2.22	−29.91
UKEU		7,645	0.3	+0.3
Independent		3,650	0.14	N/A
Socialist (GB)		3,505	0.14	−0.1
Independent		2,606	0.1	N/A
Independent		1,587	0.06	N/A
Turnout		2,538,945		

== Leadership elections ==
2006 UK Independence Party leadership election
Candidate	Votes	%
Nigel Farage	3,329	45.0
Richard Suchorzewski	1,782	24.1
David Campbell Bannerman	1,443	19.5
David Noakes	851	11.5
Turnout	7,405	

2010 UK Independence Party leadership election
Candidate	Votes	%
Nigel Farage	6,085	60.5
Tim Congdon	2,037	20.3
David Campbell Bannerman	1,404	14.0
Winston McKenzie	530	5.3
Turnout	10,056	
