= List of members of the European Parliament for the United Kingdom (1994–1999) =

== List ==
Name	National party	EP Group	Constituency
Gordon Adam	Labour Party	PES	Northumbria
Richard Balfe	Labour Party	PES	London South Inner
Roger Barton	Labour Party	PES	Sheffield
Angela Billingham	Labour Party	PES	Northamptonshire and Blaby
David Bowe	Labour Party	PES	Cleveland and Richmond
Bryan Cassidy	Conservative Party	EPP	Dorset and East Devon
Giles Chichester	Conservative Party	EPP	Devon and East Plymouth
Ken Coates	Labour Party / / Independent (Jan 1998)	PES / G	Nottinghamshire North and Chesterfield
Kenneth Collins	Labour Party	PES	Strathclyde East
John Corrie	Conservative Party	EPP	Worcestershire and South Warwickshire
Peter Crampton	Labour Party	PES	Humberside
Christine Crawley	Labour Party	PES	Birmingham East
Tony Cunningham	Labour Party	PES	Cumbria and Lancashire North
Wayne David	Labour Party	PES	South Wales Central
Alan Donnelly	Labour Party	PES	Tyne and Wear
Brendan Donnelly	Conservative Party / Pro-Euro Conservative Party (Jan 1999)	EPP	Sussex South and Crawley
James Elles	Conservative Party	EPP	Buckinghamshire and Oxfordshire East
Michael Elliott	Labour Party	PES	London West
Robert Evans	Labour Party	PES	London North West
Winnie Ewing	Scottish National Party	ERA	Highlands and Islands
Alexander Falconer	Labour Party	PES	Mid Scotland and Fife
Glyn Ford	Labour Party	PES	Greater Manchester East
Pauline Green	Labour Party	PES	London North
David Hallam	Labour Party	PES	Herefordshire and Shropshire
Veronica Hardstaff	Labour Party	PES	Lincolnshire and Humberside South
Lyndon Harrison	Labour Party	PES	Cheshire West and Wirral
Mark Hendrick	Labour Party	PES	Lancashire Central
Michael Hindley	Labour Party	PES	Lancashire South
Richard Howitt	Labour Party	PES	Essex South
Stephen Hughes	Labour Party	PES	Durham
John Hume	Social Democratic and Labour Party	PES	Northern Ireland
Caroline Jackson	Conservative Party	EPP	Wiltshire North and Bath
Edward Kellett-Bowman	Conservative Party	EPP	Itchen, Test and Avon
Hugh Kerr	Labour Party / Scottish Socialist Party (1998)	PES / G	Essex West and Hertfordshire East
Glenys Kinnock	Labour Party	PES	South Wales East
Alfred Lomas	Labour Party	PES	London North East
Allan Macartney	Scottish National Party	ERA	North East Scotland
David Martin	Labour Party	PES	Lothians
Graham Mather	Conservative Party	EPP	Hampshire North and Oxford
Arlene McCarthy	Labour Party	PES	Peak District
Michael McGowan	Labour Party	PES	Leeds
Anne McIntosh	Conservative Party	EPP	Essex North and Suffolk South
Hugh McMahon	Labour Party	PES	Strathclyde West
Edward McMillan-Scott	Conservative Party	EPP	North Yorkshire
Eryl McNally	Labour Party	PES	Bedfordshire and Milton Keynes
Thomas Megahy	Labour Party	PES	Yorkshire South West
Bill Miller	Labour Party	PES	Glasgow
James Moorhouse	Conservative Party / Liberal Democrats (Oct 1998)	EPP / ELDR	London South and Surrey East
Eluned Morgan	Labour Party	PES	Mid and West Wales
David Morris	Labour Party	PES	South Wales West
Simon Murphy	Labour Party	PES	Midlands West
Clive Needle	Labour Party	PES	Norfolk
Stan Newens	Labour Party	PES	London Central
Eddie Newman	Labour Party	PES	Greater Manchester Central
Jim Nicholson	Ulster Unionist Party	EPP	Northern Ireland
Christine Oddy	Labour Party	PES	Coventry and North Warwickshire
Ian Paisley	Democratic Unionist Party	NI	Northern Ireland
Roy Perry	Conservative Party	EPP	Wight and Hampshire South
Lord Plumb	Conservative Party	EPP	Cotswolds
Anita Pollack; Nationality: Australian	Labour Party	PES	London South West
James Provan	Conservative Party	EPP	South Downs West
Imelda Read	Labour Party	PES	Nottingham and Leicestershire North West
Barry Seal	Labour Party	PES	Yorkshire West
Brian Simpson	Labour Party	PES	Cheshire East
Peter Skinner	Labour Party	PES	Kent West
Alex Smith	Labour Party	PES	South of Scotland
Tom Spencer	Conservative Party / Independent (Jan 1999)	EPP	Surrey
Shaun Spiers	Labour Party	PES	London South East
John Stevens	Conservative Party / Pro-Euro Conservative Party (Jan 1999)	EPP	Thames Valley
Kenneth Stewart	Labour Party	PES	Merseyside West
Jack Stewart-Clark	Conservative Party	EPP	East Sussex and Kent South
Robert Sturdy	Conservative Party	EPP	Cambridgeshire
Michael Tappin	Labour Party	PES	Staffordshire West and Congleton
Robin Teverson	Liberal Democrats	ELDR	Cornwall and West Plymouth
David Thomas	Labour Party	PES	Suffolk and South West Norfolk
Gary Titley	Labour Party	PES	Greater Manchester West
John Tomlinson	Labour Party	PES	Birmingham West
Carole Tongue	Labour Party	PES	London East
Peter Truscott	Labour Party	PES	Hertfordshire
Susan Waddington	Labour Party	PES	Leicester
Graham Watson	Liberal Democrats	ELDR	Somerset and North Devon
Mark Watts	Labour Party	PES	Kent East
Norman West	Labour Party	PES	Yorkshire South
Ian White	Labour Party	PES	Bristol
Phillip Whitehead	Labour Party	PES	Staffordshire East and Derby
Joe Wilson	Labour Party	PES	North Wales
Terry Wynn	Labour Party	PES	Merseyside East and Wigan

== By-elections ==
=== 1996 ===
- 12 December: Merseyside, West--Richard Corbett (Lab), replacing deceased Kenneth Stewart

=== 1998 ===
- 7 May: Yorkshire, South--Linda McAvan (Lab), replacing resigned Norman West
- 26 November: Scotland, North East--Ian Hudghton (SNP), replacing deceased Allan Macartney

== Changes of allegiance ==
- Ken Coates and Hugh Kerr had the Labour whip suspended in January 1998 when they joined the Green group in the European Parliament; Kerr subsequently joined the Scottish Socialist Party.
- James Moorhouse changed from Conservative to Liberal Democrat on 8 October 1998.
- Brendan Donnelly and John Stevens resigned from the Conservative Party in January 1999 and subsequently established the Pro-Euro Conservative Party.
- Tom Spencer had the Conservative whip suspended on 31 January 1999.

== See also ==
- 1994 European Parliament election in the United Kingdom
