= List of members of the European Parliament for the United Kingdom (2019–2020) =

United Kingdom of the 2019 European Parliament election

The 9th European Parliament was elected across the European Union in the late days of May 2019 for the 2019–2024 session. In the United Kingdom the election took place on 23 May. The elected MEPs sat until the formal Brexit date – 31 January 2020.

== Final members ==
Name	Image	Constituency	National party	European Parliament group
Scott Ainslie		London	Green Party (England and Wales)	Greens–EFA
Christian Allard		Scotland	Scottish National Party	Greens–EFA
Heather Anderson		Scotland	Scottish National Party	Greens–EFA
Martina Anderson		Northern Ireland	Sinn Féin	EUL-NGL
Catherine Bearder		South East England	Liberal Democrats	Renew Europe
Phil Bennion		West Midlands	Liberal Democrats	Renew Europe
Jane Brophy		North West England	Liberal Democrats	Renew Europe
David Bull		North West England	Brexit Party	NI
Jonathan Bullock		East Midlands	Brexit Party	NI
Judith Bunting		South East England	Liberal Democrats	Renew Europe
Ellie Chowns		West Midlands	Green Party (England and Wales)	Greens–EFA
Richard Corbett		Yorkshire and the Humber	Labour Party	S&D
Seb Dance		London	Labour Party	S&D
Martin Daubney		West Midlands	Brexit Party	NI
Chris Davies		North West England	Liberal Democrats	Renew Europe
Dinesh Dhamija		London	Liberal Democrats	Renew Europe
Diane Dodds		Northern Ireland	Democratic Unionist Party	NI
Gina Dowding		North West England	Green Party (England and Wales)	Greens–EFA
Jill Evans		Wales	Plaid Cymru	Greens–EFA
Nigel Farage		South East England	Brexit Party	NI
Lance Forman		London	Conservative Party	ECR
Claire Fox		North West England	Brexit Party	NI
Barbara Gibson		East of England	Liberal Democrats	Renew Europe
Nathan Gill		Wales	Brexit Party	NI
Neena Gill		West Midlands	Labour Party	S&D
James Glancy		South West England	Brexit Party	NI
Theresa Griffin		North West England	Labour Party	S&D
Ben Habib		London	Brexit Party	NI
Daniel Hannan		South East England	Conservative Party	ECR
Lucy Harris		Yorkshire and the Humber	Conservative Party	ECR
Michael Heaver		East of England	Brexit Party	NI
Antony Hook		South East England	Liberal Democrats	Renew Europe
Martin Horwood		South West England	Liberal Democrats	Renew Europe
John Howarth		South East England	Labour Party	S&D
Jackie Jones		Wales	Labour Party	S&D
Christina Jordan		South West England	Brexit Party	NI
Andrew Kerr		West Midlands	Independent	NI
Jude Kirton-Darling		North East England	Labour Party	S&D
Naomi Long		Northern Ireland	Alliance Party of Northern Ireland	Renew Europe
John Longworth		Yorkshire and the Humber	Conservative Party	ECR
Rupert Lowe		West Midlands	Brexit Party	NI
Belinda De Camborne Lucy		South East England	Brexit Party	NI
Magid Magid		Yorkshire and the Humber	Green Party (England and Wales)	Greens–EFA
Anthea McIntyre		West Midlands	Conservative Party	ECR
Aileen McLeod		Scotland	Scottish National Party	Greens–EFA
Nosheena Mobarik		Scotland	Conservative Party	ECR
Shaffaq Mohammed		Yorkshire and the Humber	Liberal Democrats	Renew Europe
Brian Monteith		North East England	Brexit Party	NI
Claude Moraes		London	Labour Party	S&D
June Mummery		East of England	Brexit Party	NI
Lucy Nethsingha		East of England	Liberal Democrats	Renew Europe
Bill Newton Dunn		East Midlands	Liberal Democrats	Renew Europe
Henrik Overgaard-Nielsen		North West England	Brexit Party	NI
Rory Palmer		East Midlands	Labour Party	S&D
Matthew Patten		East Midlands	Brexit Party	NI
Alex Phillips		South East England	Green Party (England and Wales)	Greens–EFA
Alexandra Phillips		South East England	Brexit Party	NI
Luisa Porritt		London	Liberal Democrats	Renew Europe
Jake Pugh		Yorkshire and the Humber	Brexit Party	NI
Annunziata Rees-Mogg		East Midlands	Conservative Party	ECR
Sheila Ritchie		Scotland	Liberal Democrats	Renew Europe
Catherine Rowett		East of England	Green Party (England and Wales)	Greens–EFA
Robert Rowland		South East England	Brexit Party	NI
Molly Scott Cato		South West England	Green Party (England and Wales)	Greens–EFA
Louis Stedman-Bryce		Scotland	Independent	NI
John Tennant		North East England	Brexit Party	NI
Richard Tice		East of England	Brexit Party	NI
Geoffrey Van Orden		East of England	Conservative Party	ECR
Caroline Voaden		South West England	Liberal Democrats	Renew Europe
Irina Von Wiese		London	Liberal Democrats	Renew Europe
Julie Ward		North West England	Labour Party	S&D
James Wells		Wales	Brexit Party	NI
Ann Widdecombe		South West England	Brexit Party	NI

== Changes in members or affiliation ==
- Alyn Smith won a seat in the House of Commons for SNP in December 2019. He therefore ceased to be an MEP for Scotland then. Heather Anderson was nominated to replace him as MEP. Anderson only served as MEP from 28 January until the Brexit date on 31 January, a total of 4 days.
- Annunziata Rees-Mogg, Lance Forman, Lucy Harris and John Longworth left the Brexit Party and joined the Conservatives. Louis Stedman-Bryce and Andrew England Kerr changed their affiliation from the Brexit Party to be independent.
