= Members of the European Parliament for the United Kingdom 1999–2004 by region =

This is a list of United Kingdom members of the European Parliament for the 1999–2004 session. The UK is divided into twelve constituencies, with varying numbers of members: one constituency each for Scotland, Wales and Northern Ireland, and one each for the nine Regions of England.

See MEPs for the UK 1999–2004 for an alphabetical list.

== East Midlands ==
1. Roger Helmer
2. Mel Read
3. Bill Newton Dunn
4. Phillip Whitehead
5. Christopher Heaton-Harris
6. Nicholas Clegg

== East of England ==
1. Robert Sturdy
2. Eryl McNally
3. Christopher Beazley
4. Bashir Khanbhai
5. Richard Howitt
6. Andrew Duff
7. Geoffrey van Orden
8. Jeffrey Titford

== London ==
1. Claude Moraes
2. Theresa Villiers
3. Robert Evans
4. Charles Tannock
5. Richard Balfe
6. Sarah Ludford
7. Ian Twinn
8. Mary Honeyball (replaced resigned Pauline Green in 2000)
9. John Bowis
10. Jean Lambert

== Northern Ireland ==
1. Ian Paisley
2. John Hume
3. Jim Nicholson

== North East England ==
1. Gordon Adam
2. Martin Callanan
3. Alan Donnelly (resigned January 2000)
4. Stephen Hughes
5. Barbara O'Toole

== North West England ==
1. Richard Inglewood
2. Arlene McCarthy
3. Robert Atkins
4. Gary Titley
5. David Sumberg
6. Chris Davies
7. Terry Wynn
8. Den Dover
9. Brian Simpson
10. Jacqueline Foster

== Scotland ==
1. David Martin
2. Ian Hudghton
3. Struan Stevenson
4. Bill Miller
5. Neil MacCormick
6. John Purvis
7. Elspeth Attwooll
8. Catherine Stihler

== South East England ==
1. James Provan
2. Roy Perry
3. Peter Skinner
4. Emma Nicholson
5. Daniel Hannan
6. James Elles
7. Mark Watts
8. Nigel Farage
9. Nirj Deva
10. Chris Huhne
11. Caroline Lucas
12. Marta Andreasen

== South West England ==
1. Caroline Jackson
2. Giles Chichester
3. Glyn Ford
4. Graham Watson
5. Alexandar Macmillan
6. Graham Booth (replaced resigned Michael Holmes in 2002)
7. Neil Parish

== Yorkshire and the Humber ==
1. Andrew Brons
2. Edward McMillan Scott
3. Linda McAvan
4. Timothy Kirkhope
5. David Bowe
6. Diana Wallis
7. Robert Goodwill
8. Richard Corbett

== Wales ==
1. John Bufton
2. Glenys Kinnock
3. Jillian Evans
4. Jonathan Evans
5. Eluned Morgan
6. Eurig Wyn

== West Midlands ==
1. John Corrie
2. Simon Murphy
3. Philip Bushill-Matthews
4. Michael Cashman
5. Malcolm Harbour
6. Liz Lynne
7. Philip Bradbourn
8. Neena Gill
