= Ray Finch =

British politician (born 1963)

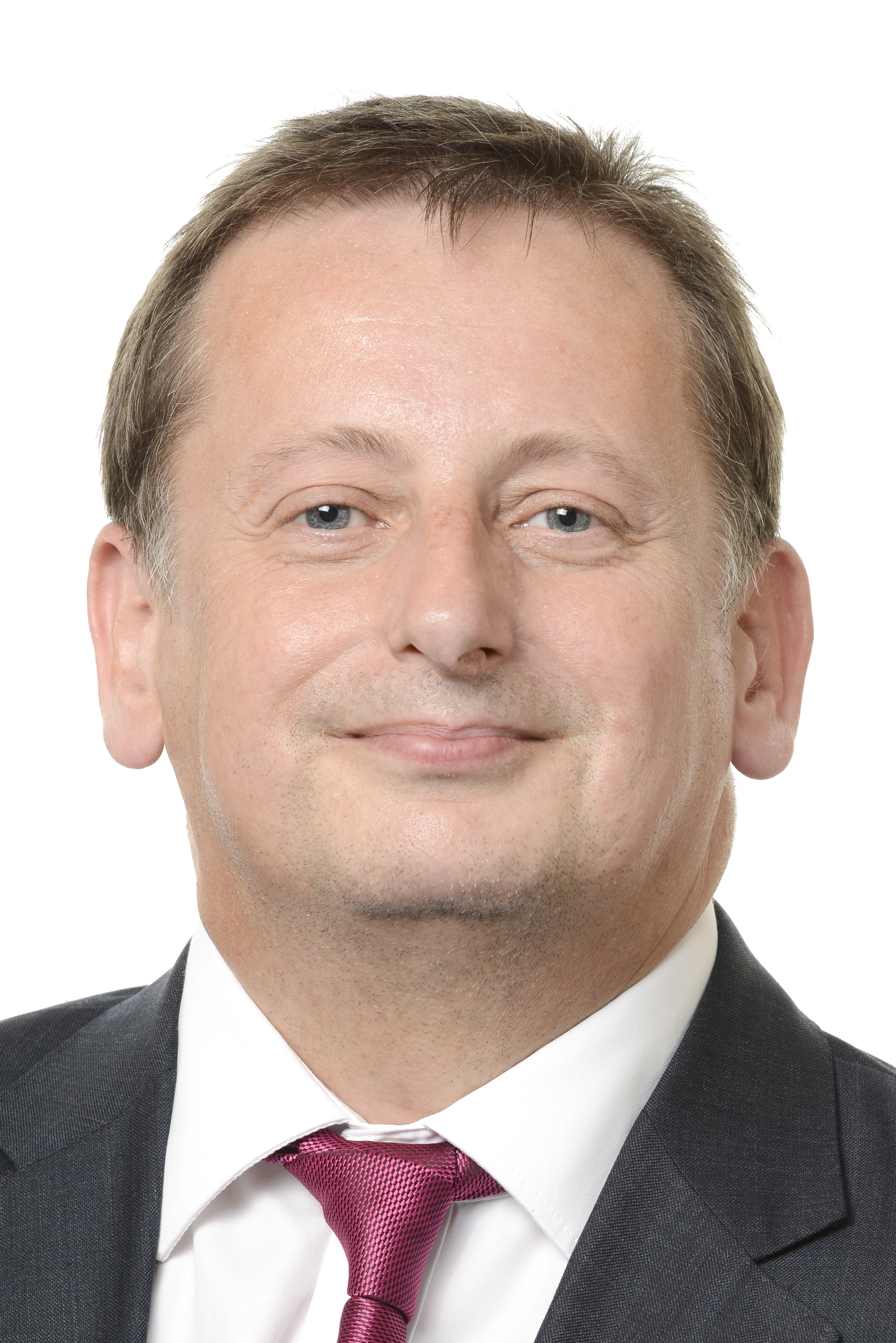

Member of the European Parliament for South East England
- In office 1 July 2014 – 1 July 2019
- Preceded by: James Elles
- Succeeded by: Robert Rowland

Personal details
- Born: 2 June 1963 (age 63) Liverpool, England
- Party: UK Independence Party (until April 2019); Brexit Party (April–May 2019)
Other UKIP offices
UKIP Spokesperson for Foreign and Commonwealth Affairs
In office 6 December 2016 – 16 April 2019
Succeeded by	Vacant
UKIP Spokesperson for Defence
In office 17 February 2018 – 17 April 2019
Leader	Gerard Batten
Preceded by	Henry Bolton
Succeeded by	Mike Hookem
Leader of UKIP in the European Parliament
In office 7 January 2017 – 14 April 2018; Deputy Leader: 14 April 2018 - 16 April 2019
Preceded by	Paul Nuttall
Succeeded by	Gerard Batten (Leader); Stuart Agnew (Deputy)
UKIP Spokesperson for Housing
In office 6 December 2016 – 14 April 2018
Preceded by	Andrew Charalambous
Succeeded by	Andrew Charalambous
UKIP Spokesperson for Fisheries
In office 24 July 2014 – 29 November 2016
Preceded by	Office established
Succeeded by	Mike Hookem

Raymond Finch (born 2 June 1963) is a British politician who served as a Member of the European Parliament (MEP) for South East England between 2014 and 2019.

The fourth named candidate on the UK Independence Party (UKIP) list for the South East England constituency, he was elected as a Member of the European Parliament after the 2014 European Parliamentary Election.

Finch was the leader of the UKIP group on Hampshire County Council, standing down on election to the European Parliament. He resigned as a councillor in January 2017 following his appointment as head of the UK Europe of Freedom and Direct Democracy delegation in the European Parliament.

On 17 April 2019, Finch left UKIP to join the Brexit Party. He was not selected as a Brexit Party candidate for the 2019 European Parliamentary election, and ceased to sit as a Brexit Party MEP on 26 May 2019.
