= South East England (European Parliament constituency) =

- European Parliament constituency
- Location among the 2014 constituencies

- Shown within England
- Member state: United Kingdom
- Created: 1999
- Dissolved: 31 January 2020
- MEPs: 11 (1999–2004); 10 (2004–2020)

South East England was a constituency of the European Parliament. It elected 10 Members of the European Parliament (MEPs) using the D'Hondt method of party-list proportional representation until the UK exit from the European Union on 31 January 2020.

== Boundaries ==
The constituency corresponded to South East England, in the south east of the United Kingdom, comprising the ceremonial counties of Berkshire, Buckinghamshire, East Sussex, Hampshire, the Isle of Wight, Kent, Oxfordshire, Surrey and West Sussex.

== History ==
It was formed as a result of the European Parliamentary Elections Act 1999, replacing a number of single-member constituencies. These were Buckinghamshire and Oxfordshire East, East Sussex and Kent South, Hampshire North and Oxford, Itchen, Test and Avon, Kent East, Kent West, South Downs West, Surrey, Sussex South and Crawley, Thames Valley, Wight and Hampshire South, and parts of Bedfordshire and Milton Keynes, Cotswolds, and London South and Surrey East.

MEPs for former South East England constituencies, 1979–1999
Election	1979–1984	1984–1989	1989–1994	1994–1999
Sussex East (1979–1994); East Sussex and Kent South (1994–1999)	Jack Stewart-Clark; Conservative			
Hampshire West (1979–1984); Hampshire Central (1984–1994); Itchen, Test and Avon (1994–1999)	Basil de Ferranti; Conservative		Edward Kellett-Bowman; Conservative	
Kent East	Christopher Jackson; Conservative			Mark Watts; Labour
Kent West	Ben Patterson; Conservative			Peter Skinner; Labour
Surrey (1979–1984, 1994–1999); Surrey West (1984–1994)	Charles Wellesley; Conservative		Tom Spencer; Conservative	
Sussex West (1979–1994); Sussex South and Crawley (1994–1999)	Madron Seligman; Conservative			Brendan Donnelly; Conservative (1994–1999); Pro-Euro Conservative (1999)
Thames Valley	Diana Elles; Conservative		John Stevens; Conservative (1989–1999); Pro-Euro Conservative (1999)	
Wight and Hampshire East (1979–1994); Wight and Hampshire South (1994–1999)	Stanley Johnson; Conservative	Richard Simmonds; Conservative		Roy Perry; Conservative
Oxfordshire and Buckinghamshire (1984–1994); Buckinghamshire and Oxfordshire East (1994–1999)	Seat not established	James Elles; Conservative		
Hampshire North and Oxford	Seat not established			Graham Mather; Conservative
South Downs West	Seat not established			James Provan; Conservative

== Returned members ==
MEPs for South East England, 1999 onwards
Election	1999 (5th parliament)	2004 (6th parliament)	2009 (7th parliament)	2014 (8th parliament)	2019 (9th parliament)
MEP Party	Nigel Farage; UKIP (1999–2018); Independent (2018–2019); Brexit Party (2019–2020)				
MEP Party	Roy Perry; Conservative	Ashley Mote; UKIP (2004); Independent (2004–2009)	Marta Andreasen; UKIP (2009–2013); Conservative (2013–2014)	Ray Finch; UKIP (2014–2019); Brexit Party (2019)	Robert Rowland; Brexit Party
MEP Party	James Elles; Conservative			Diane James; UKIP (2014–2016); Independent (2016–2019); Brexit Party (2019)	Alexandra Phillips; Brexit Party
MEP Party	Nirj Deva; Conservative				Belinda de Lucy; Brexit Party
MEP Party	Daniel Hannan; Conservative				
MEP Party	James Provan; Conservative	Richard Ashworth; Conservative (2004–2017); Independent (2017–2019); Change UK (2019)			Judith Bunting; Liberal Democrats
MEP Party	Chris Huhne; Liberal Democrats		Sharon Bowles; Liberal Democrats	Janice Atkinson; UKIP (2014–2015); Independent (2015–2019)	Antony Hook; Liberal Democrats
MEP Party	Emma Nicholson, Baroness Nicholson of Winterbourne; Liberal Democrats		Catherine Bearder; Liberal Democrats		
MEP Party	Caroline Lucas; Green			Keith Taylor; Green	Alexandra Phillips; Green
MEP Party	Peter Skinner; Labour			Anneliese Dodds (2014–2017); Labour	John Howarth (2017–2020); Labour
MEP Party	Mark Watts; Labour	Seat abolished			

Key to political groups of the European Parliament (UK)
Party			Faction in European Parliament	
Brexit Party	29		Non-Inscrits	57
DUP	1		Non-Inscrits	57
Liberal Democrats	16	17	Renew Europe	108
Alliance	1	17	Renew Europe	108
Green	7	11	Greens–European Free Alliance	75
SNP	3	11	Greens–European Free Alliance	75
Plaid Cymru	1	11	Greens–European Free Alliance	75
Labour	10		Socialists and Democrats	154
Conservative	4		European Conservatives and Reformists Group	62
Sinn Féin	1		European United Left–Nordic Green Left	41
Total	73		Total	750

== Election results ==
Elected candidates are shown in bold. Brackets indicate the order candidates were elected and the number of votes per seat won in their respective columns.

=== 2019 ===
2019 results

2019: South East England
List	Candidates	Votes	Of total (%)	± from prev.
Brexit Party	**Nigel Farage** (1) **Alexandra Lesley Phillips** (3) **Robert Andrew Rowland** (6) **Belinda de Lucy** (8) James Gilbert Bartholomew, Christopher Graham Ellis, John Kennedy, Matthew Peter Taylor, George Thomas Stahel Farmer, Peter David Wiltshire	915,686 (228,921.5)	36.07	New
Liberal Democrats	**Catherine Bearder** (2) **Antony Hook** (5) **Judith Bunting** (9) Martin Paul Niebuhr Tod, Elizabeth Pendrill Raphael Leffman, Christopher Alan Bowers, Giles Damian Goodall, Ruvi Ziegler, Nicholas David Stanford Perry, John William Vincent	653,743 (217,914.33)	25.75	+17.71
Green	**Alexandra Phillips** (4) Elise Danielle Benjamin, Vix Lowthion, Leslie Christine Groves Williams, Phelim Mac Cafferty, Jan Hendrik Jamison Doerfel, Larry Sanders, Isabella Lina Marie Moir, Oliver Sykes, Jonathan Christopher St.Aubyn Essex	343,249	13.52	+4.46
Conservative	**Daniel Hannan** (7) Nirj Deva, Richard McDonald Robinson, Mike Whiting, Juliette Katherine Christie Ash, Anna Firth, Adrian Pepper, Clarence Mitchell, Neva Sadikoglu-Novaky, Caroline Anne Newton	260,277	10.25	−20.70
Labour	**John Howarth** (10) Cathy Shutt, Arran Richard Neathey, Emma Christina Turnbull, Rohit K. Dasgupta, Amy Lauren Fowler, Duncan Shaw Thomas Enright, Lubna Aiysha Arshad, Simon Guy Burgess, Rachael Eowyn Ward	184,678	7.27	−7.39
Change UK	Richard Ashworth, Victoria Groulef, Warren Morgan, Eleanor Mary Fuller, Robin John Bextor, Nicholas Mazzei, Suzana Carp, Phil Murphy, Heather Marion Allen, Diane Helen Yeo	105,832	4.17	New
UKIP	Piers Wauchope, Elizabeth Fletcher Philips, Daryll James Pitcher, Martin Toby Brothers, Tony Gould, Clive Keith Egan, Troy De Leon, Alan Harvey Stone, Judy Moore, Patricia Ann Mountain	56,487	2.22	−29.91
UKEU	Pacelli Ndikumana, Clinton Powe	7,645	0.3	New
Independent	Jason Guy Spencer McMahon	3,650	0.14	New
Socialist (GB)	Mandy Bruce, Raymond Dennis Carr, David Stanley Chesham, Robert Alexander Cox, Michael Foster, Stephen Harper, Neil Kirk, Anton Charles Pruden, Andrew Brian Thomas-Emans, Darren James Williams	3,505	0.14	−0.1
Independent	David Victor Round	2,606	0.1	New
Independent	Michael Jeffrey Turberville	1,587	0.06	New
Turnout		2,538,945		

=== 2014 ===
2014 results

2014: South East England
List	Candidates	Votes	Of total (%)	± from prev.
UKIP	**Nigel Farage** (1) **Janice Atkinson** (3) **Diane James** (6) **Ray Finch** (10) Donna Edmunds, Patricia Culligan, Nigel Jones, Alan Stevens, Simon Strutt, Barry Cooper	751,439 (187,860)	32.14	+13.29
Conservative	**Daniel Hannan** (2) **Nirj Deva** (4) **Richard Ashworth** (7) Marta Andreasen, Richard Robinson, Graham Knight, Julie Marson, George Jeffrey, Rory Love, Adrian Pepper	723,571 (241,190)	30.95	−3.84
Labour	**Anneliese Dodds** (5) John Howarth, Emily Westley, James Swindlehurst, Farah Nazeer, James Watkins, Maggie Hughes, Chris Clark, Karen Landles, Tracey Hill	342,775	14.66	+6.41
Green	**Keith Taylor** (8) Alexandra Phillips, Derek Wall, Jason Kitcat, Miriam Kennet, Beverley Golden, Jonathan Essex, Jonathan Kent, Stuart Jeffrey, Ray Cunningham	211,706	9.05	−2.57
Liberal Democrats	**Catherine Bearder** (9) Antony Hook, Dinti Batstone, Giles Goodall, Ian Bearder, Allis Moss, Steve Sollitt, Bruce Tennent, John Vincent, Alan Bullion	187,876	8.04	−6.11
Independence from Europe	Laurence Stassen, Joyce Nattress, Paul Godfrey, Alan Sheath, Ken Holton, Mark Henry, Keith Vernon, Michaelina Argy, Seana Connolly, Dorothy Sheath	45,199	1.93	New
English Democrat	Steve Uncles, Julia Gasper, Amanda Hopwood, Simone Clark, Steve Clegg, Milly Uncles, Mike Russell, Mike Tibby, Doreen Dye, William James	17,771	0.76	−1.49
BNP	John Robinson, Gavin Miller, Eric Elliot, John Moore, Alwyn Deacon, Anthony Banner, Brenda Waterhouse, Mark Jones, Jack Renshaw, Yvonne Deacon	16,909	0.72	−3.64
CPA	Norman Burnett, Suzanne Fernandes, Flora Amar, Rev Anthony, Dorothy Mugara, Kayode Shedowo, Bridget Oyekan, Nnenna St Luce, Chukka Roja	14,893	0.64	−0.89
Peace	John Morris, Jim Duggan, Julie Roxburgh, Jeff Bolam, Geoff Pay, David Brown, Keith Scott, Imdad Hussain, Minim Chowdhury, Charles Wilkinson	10,130	0.43	+0.02
Socialist (GB)	Dave Chesham, Rob Cox, Les Courtney, Sean Deegan, Max Hess, Claudia Hogg-Blake, Danny Lambert, Andy Matthews, Howard Pilott, Mike Young	5,454	0.23	New
Roman Party	Jean-Louis Pascual	2,997	0.13	−0.11
YOURvoice	Julian James, Rachel Ling, Fulvia James	2.932	0.12	New
Liberty GB	Paul Weston, Enza Ferreri, Jack Buckby	2,494	0.10	New
Harmony Party	Tony Leach, Raymond Crick	1,904	0.08	New
Turnout		2,348,168	36.5	−1.0

=== 2009 ===
2009 results

2009: South East England
List	Candidates	Votes	Of total (%)	± from prev.
Conservative	**Daniel Hannan** (1) **Richard Ashworth** (3) **Nirj Deva** (6) **James Elles** (8) Thérèse Coffey, Sarah Richardson, Richard Robinson, Tony Devenish, Niina Kaariniemi, Marc Brunel-Walker	812,288 (203,072)	34.8	−0.4
UKIP	**Nigel Farage** (2) **Marta Andreasen** (7) Steve Harris, Phillip Van der Elst, Harry Aldridge, Victor Webb, Christopher Browne, Andrew Moncreiff, Mark Stroud, Rob Burberry, Mahzar Manzoor, Ray Finch	440,002 (220,001)	18.8	−0.7
Liberal Democrats	**Sharon Bowles** (4) **Catherine Bearder** (10) Ben Abbots, Jim Barnard, Antony Hook, Zoe Patrick, Gary Lawson, David Grace, John Vincent, James Walsh	330,340 (165,170)	14.1	−1.2
Green	**Caroline Lucas** (5) Keith Taylor, Derek Wall, Miriam Kennet, Jason Kitcat, Hazel Dawe, Jonathan Essex, Matthew Ledbury, Steve Dawe, Beverley Golden	271,506	11.6	+3.7
Labour	**Peter Skinner** (9) Janet Sully, Bob Fromont, Lisa Homan, Stephen Alambritis, Janet Keene, Munir Malik, Silke Thomson-Pottebohm, Rajinder Sandhu, Sukhi Dhaliwal	192,592	8.2	−5.5
BNP	Tim Rait, Donna Bailey, Mark Burke, Andrew Emerson, Lynne Mozar, David Little, Peter Lane, Brian Horne, Adam Champneys, Andy McBride	101,769	4.4	+1.5
English Democrat	Steve Uncles, David Knight, Mike Tibby, Sean Varnham, Cllr Clive Maltby, Laurence Williams, Elizabeth Painter, Gerald Lambourne, John Griffiths, George Herbert	52,526	2.2	+0.9
Christian	Anthony May, Peter Joyce, Christabel McLean-Bacchus, William Thompson, David Ashton, Alexander Wilson, David Hews, Debra Smith-Gorick, Je'ran Cherub, Kenneth Scrimshaw	35,712	1.5	New
NO2EU	Dave Hill, Garry Hassell, Kevin Hayes, Owen Morris, Gawain Little, Robert Wilkinson, Jacqui Berry, Nick Wright, Nick Chaffey, Sarah Wrack	21,455	0.9	New
Libertas	Kevin O'Connell, Daniel Hill, Neil Glass, Chloe Woodhead, Guy Lambert, Graheme Leon-Smith, Peter Grace, Nicholas Heather, David Peace	16,767	0.7	New
Socialist Labour	Derek Isaacs, Paramjit Singh Bahia, John McLeod, Ian Fyvie, Patricia Ruiz, Richard Mooney, Maureen Stubbings, Derek Stubbings, Mary Byrne, Eleanor Little	15,484	0.7	New
UK First	Petrina Holdsworth, John Petley, Martin Haslam, Jennifer Parsons	15,261	0.7	New
Jury Team	Nick Trew, Nonie Bouverat, Lyn Tofari, Geoff Howard, Gerry Brierley, Anant Vyas, Michael Guest, Tony Sansum, John Lenton	14,172	0.6	New
Peace	John Morris, Geoffery Pay, Jim Duggan, Julie Roxburgh, Keith Scott, Shafaq Iqbal, Jenny Watson, Marcus Trower, Jeff Bolam, David Brown	9,534	0.4	−0.2
Roman Party	Jean-Louis Pascal	5,450	0.2	New
Turnout		2,334,858	37.5	+1.0

=== 2004 ===
2004 results

2004: South East England
List	Candidates	Votes	Of total (%)	± from prev.
Conservative	**Daniel Hannan** (1) **Nirj Deva**(3) **James Elles** (6) **Richard Ashworth** (8) Roy Perry, Thérèse Coffey, David Logan, Ferris Cowper, Richard Robinson	776,370 (194,092.5)	35.2	−9.2
UKIP	**Nigel Farage** (2) **Ashley Mote** (7) David Lott, Craig Mackinlay, Timothy Cross, Petrina Holdsworth, David Abbott, Stephen Harris, Michael Wigley, Lisa Hawkins	431,111 (215,555.5)	19.5	+9.8
Liberal Democrats	**Chris Huhne** (4) **Baroness Nicholson of Winterbourne** (10) Sharon Bowles, Catherine Bearder, James Walsh, Ann Lee, John Vincent, John Ford, Charles Fraser-Fleming, James Barnard	338,342 (169,171)	15.3	0.0
Labour	**Peter Skinner** (5) Mark Watts, Ann Davison, Simon Burgess, Janet Sully, Mark Muller, Josephine Wood, Raj Chandarana, Gillian Roles, David Menon	301,398	13.7	−5.9
Green	**Caroline Lucas** (9) Mike Woodin, Miriam Kennet, Keith Taylor, Alan Francis, Xanthe Bevis, Hazel Dawe, Derek Wall, Anthony Cooper, Michael Stimson	173,351	7.9	+0.5
BNP	Brian Galloway, Julie Russell, Timothy Rait, Peter Lane, Roger Robertson, Julian Crewe, Adam Champneys, Ian Johnson, Dennis Whiting, Vernon Atkinson	64,877	2.9	+2.1
Senior Citizens	Grahame Leon-Smith, David Gray, Patrick Eston, Rona Brown, Paresh Kotecha, Larry Kreeger, Michael Devine, Terry Patinson, Ian Murdoch, Alfred Egleton	42,861	1.9	New
English Democrat	Steven Uncles, Robert Sulley, Courtney Williams, Richard Sutton, Jacqueline Brookman, David Uncles, Louise Uncles	29,126	1.3	New
Respect	Ingrid Dodd, Patrick O'Keeffe, Muriel Hirsch, Ajaz Khan, Sally Watkins, Jonathan Molyneux, Norman Thomas, Ella Noyes, Bunny La Roche, Angelina Rai	13,426	0.9	New
Peace	John Morris, Caroline O'Reilly, Geoffrey Pay, Rachel Hancock, James Duggan, Kate Hebden, Cyril Bolam, Carol Morris, Anne Brewer	12,572	0.6	New
CPA	David John Bamber, David Campanale, Gladstone Macaulay	11,733	0.5	New
ProLife Alliance	Dominica Roberts, Gillian Duval, Josephine Quintavalle, Penelope Orford, Mark Carroll, Rebecca Ng, John Dixon, Francis O'Brien, Yvonne Windsor, Carl St John	6,579	0.3	New
Independent	Philip Rhodes	5,671	0.3	New
Turnout		2,207,417	36.5	+11.8

=== 1999 ===
1999 results

1999: South East England
List	Candidates	Votes	Of total (%)	± from prev.
Conservative	**James Provan** (1) **Roy Perry** (2) **Daniel Hannan** (5) **James Elles** (6) **Nirj Deva** (9) Bryony, Baroness Bethell, Edward Kellett-Bowman, Alison Parry, Jeremy Mayhew, Barry Tanswell, Richard Ashworth	661,932 (132,386.4)	44.4	
Labour	**Peter Skinner** (3) **Mark Watts** (7) Anita Pollack, Anne Snelgrove, Parmjit Dhanda, Ann Davison, Tamara Flanagan, John Howarth, Liz Clements, Alison Chapman, Sarah McCarthy-Fry	292,146 (146,073)	19.6	
Liberal Democrats	**Baroness Nicholson of Winterbourne** (4) **Chris Huhne** (10) Sharon Bowles, David Bellotti, Jo Hawkins, James Walsh, Barbara Hewett-Silk, Gerald Vernon-Jackson, Catherine Bearder, Christopher Berry, Dorothy Webb	228,136 (114,068)	15.3	
UKIP	**Nigel Farage** (8) Christopher Skeate, Tony Stone, Michael Phillips, Bernard Collignon, Ron Walters, Lynda Ross, Harold Green, Kim Rose, Michael Knight, Rob McWhirter	144,514	9.7	
Green	**Caroline Lucas** (11) Mike Woodin, Alan Francis, Pete West, Hazel Dawe, Steve Dawe, Alastair Stark, Johnny Denis, Lorraine E. Serrecchia, Laurence Littman, Julian Salmon	110,571	7.4	
Pro-Euro Conservative	John Stevens, Richard Basset, Anthony Frost, Anahita Gonzalez-Moreno, Mark Littlewood, Rebecca Pickering, Peter Sutters, Alan Armitage, Jonathan Swift, David Hurford-Jones, Richard Carswell	27,305	1.8	
BNP	Michael Easter, Dennis Whiting, Robert Andrews, Gordon Callow, Mark Cray, Ian Dell, Matthew Gould, Richard Molesworth, Margaret Stones, Christopher Telford, Kevin Yates	12,161	0.8	
Socialist Labour	Katrina Howse, Ian Fyvie, Nathan Parkin, Hannah Williams, Ken King, Sarah Hipperson, Monica Anne Parkin, John McCleod, Kenneth Ray, John Hayward, Michael Allen	7,281	0.5	
Natural Law	Peter Warburton, Nigel Kahn, John Oldbury, Jeremy Bowler, John Douglas-Small, Paul Cragg, Paul Levy, Bernard Bence, William Treend, Robert Stephens, John Hunter Thompson	2,767	0.2	
Open Democracy for Stability	Brian Bundy	1,857	0.1	
Making a Profit in Europe	John Goss	1,400	0.1	
Turnout		1,490,069	24.7	
