= Denmark Road High School =

Denmark Road High School, Gloucester
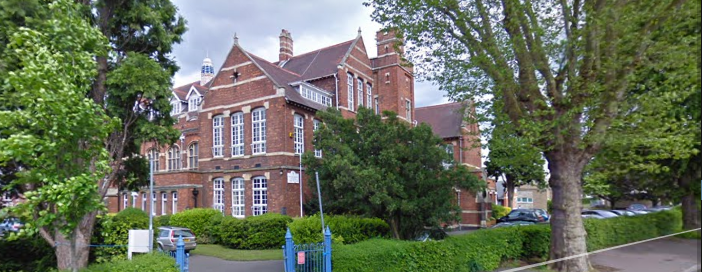

Location
- Denmark Road; Gloucester; England
- Coordinates: 51°52′22″N 2°14′12″W

Information
- Type: Grammar school; Academy
- Motto: Love genuinely, in honour, preferring one another (Romans 12:10)
- Established: 1883
- Department for Education URN: 136666 Tables
- Ofsted: Reports
- Head teacher: Claire Giblin
- Staff: 85
- Gender: Girls Year 7–11, Girls and Boys Sixth Form
- Age: 11 to 18
- Enrolment: 884
- Houses: Barwell, Bearland, Hartland, Mynd and Kyneburga
- Colours: Green, Red, Yellow, Blue, White
- Website: DenmarkRoad.org

Denmark Road High School (Formerly known as High School for Girls) is a girls' grammar school with academy status on Denmark Road, Gloucester. It has a mixed sixth form and is one of only three girls' grammar schools in Gloucestershire. It consistently ranks in league tables as one of the best schools in England, and one of the top selective schools in the UK.

== Admission ==
As a grammar school, Denmark Road has a selective admissions procedure. Girls must achieve an exceptionally high standard in the 11+ exam for admission to the main school, or be expected to do well at GCSE to be admitted to the Sixth Form. Boys and girls from other schools may attend the High School Sixth Form if they meet the entrance criteria.

== School site ==
The school was originally established in Mynd House, closer to the city centre, but relocated to Denmark Road in 1909. In January 2009, the school celebrated its 100th anniversary at the site in Denmark Road. In January 2019, the school name was formally changed from High School for Girls to Denmark Road High School, since the school had been widely known as 'Denmark Road' for many decades.

== Houses ==
There are five Houses, to which students are allocated when they join the school. These are Mynd (blue), Barwell (green), Bearland (red), Hartland (yellow) and Kyneburga (white). The names come from various aspects of the school's history: Kyneburga is the patron saint of Gloucester; Mynd was the first home of the school from 1883 to 1904; Barwell was the first headmistress on the Denmark Road site; Bearland was the home of the school from 1904 to 1908 and Hartland was the first chair of the governors at the school.

== Notable former students ==
- Monica Sims OBE – Head of Children's Programmes BBC Television, Controller of BBC Radio 4. Director of Children's Film Foundation. Writer of Women in BBC Management report.
- Alex Phillips – former Brexit Party MEP, currently a TV presenter for GB News
