= Roman Party =

British political party

The Roman Party, also known as the Roman Party. Ave, was a British political party founded by Jean-Louis Pascual, a Frenchman from Bordeaux who works as a bus driver in Reading, Berkshire. An admirer of the ancient Romans whom he wants more people to learn about, he credits "when in Rome, do as the Romans" as the basis of his policy, as well as being "against injustice", and believes that teenage mothers should be sent back to school.

The party ran in South East England in the 2009 European election, and received 5,450 votes or 0.2% of those cast in the region, the least of any candidate. Pascual therefore lost his £5,000 deposit. He spent £2,000 on his campaign, but said, "It was a great experience and the money is not wasted if that is your hobby." He ran again in the same region in 2014 as his party's only candidate (most of the other parties fielded 10 candidates), and came 12th of 15 parties, with 2,997 votes (0.13%). He also stood for the party in elections to Reading Borough Council, contesting the Battle ward. He received 43 votes and finished last of five candidates on 22 May 2014. Philip West contested the seat of Reading West for the party in the 2015 general election, finishing last of eight candidates with 64 votes.

The party did not have a website.

== Registration history ==
The party was first registered with the Electoral Commission on 26 May 2006 as "The Roman Party. Ave!". It was statutorily deregistered on 2 November 2010. Its leader and nominating officer was Pascual and its treasurer was Laetitia Jolivet. "The Roman Party. Ave" was registered on 16 April 2014 with Pascual listed as holding all three positions, and deregistered the following year. Neither version of the party filed accounts with the Commission.

== Elections contested ==
Parliamentary elections
General election, 7 May 2015

Constituency	Candidate	Votes	%
Reading, W	Philip West	64	0.1

European Parliament elections
2009 European elections

Regional lists	Candidates	Votes	%	MEPs
South East England	Jean-Louis Pascual	5,450	0.2	0

2014 European elections

Regional lists	Candidates	Votes	%	MEPs
South East England	Jean-Louis Pascual	2,997	0.13	0

Local elections

Date	District	Ward	Candidate	Votes	%
22 May 2014	Reading Borough Council	Battle	Jean-Louis Pascual	43	2.0
