= Coventry and North Warwickshire (European Parliament constituency) =

Former European Parliament constituency

- European Parliament constituency
- Boundary within the West Midlands (1994-1999)
- Member state: United Kingdom
- Created: 1994
- Dissolved: 1999
- MEPs: 1

Prior to its uniform adoption of proportional representation in 1999, the United Kingdom used first-past-the-post for the European elections in England, Scotland and Wales. The European Parliament constituencies used under that system were smaller than the later regional constituencies and only had one Member of the European Parliament each. The constituency of Coventry and North Warwickshire was one of them.

It consisted of the Westminster Parliament constituencies of Coventry North East, Coventry North West, Coventry South East, Coventry South West, Meriden, North Warwickshire, Nuneaton, and Solihull.

== Member of the European Parliament ==
Elected	Name	Party
1994	Christine Oddy	Labour

== Results ==
European Parliament election, 1994: Coventry and North Warwickshire
Party	Candidate	Votes	%	±%
Labour	Christine Oddy	89,500	52.5	
Conservative	Miss Josephine A. Crabb	45,599	26.8	
Liberal Democrats	Geoff B. Sewards	17,453	10.3	
For British Independence and Free Trade	Robert K. Meacham	9,432	5.5	
Green	Paul E.A. Baptie	4,360	2.6	
Liberal	Robert Wheway	2,885	1.7	
Natural Law	Russell B. France	1,098	0.6	
Majority		43,901	25.7	
Turnout		170,327	32.5	
Labour win (new seat)				
