= James Bartholomew (journalist) =

British journalist

James Gilbert Bartholomew (born April 1950) is a British journalist and author. He has written for the Financial Times, the Daily Mail, The Telegraph and The Spectator.

== Biography ==
Bartholomew trained as a banker in the City of London. He then moved into journalism with the Financial Times and the Far Eastern Economic Review, working in Hong Kong and Tokyo.

He is critical of the welfare state, which he regards as "dysfunctional". His book The Welfare State We're In received the Institute of Economic Affairs' Arthur Seldon Award in 2005 and the Atlas Foundation’s Sir Antony Fisher Memorial Award in 2007.

Bartholomew is credited with popularising the term "virtue signalling". Writing in The Spectator in April 2015, he defined virtue signalling as statements and positions held with the intention that the holder be "welcomed and approved for having displayed the approved, virtuous views". He comments that "No one actually has to do anything. Virtue comes from mere words or even from silently held beliefs." He has been credited with coining the phrase by The Guardian, and of being its "main popularizer" by The New York Times.

He is the founder and Director of the Museum of Communist Terror.

In the 2019 European Parliament election, Bartholomew stood as a candidate for the Brexit Party. Placed fifth on the Brexit Party's list in South East England, he was not elected, as the Brexit Party won four seats in the constituency.

== Books ==
- The Richest Man in the World: The Sultan of Brunei (1989)
- Yew & Non-Yew: Gardening for Horticultural Climbers (1996)
- The Welfare State We're In (2004; 2nd edition 2013)
- The Welfare of Nations (2015)

== See also ==
- "Authors: James Bartholomew". The Telegraph.
- "Author: James Bartholomew". The Spectator.
