= South Downs West (European Parliament constituency) =

Former European Parliament constituency

- European Parliament constituency
- Boundary within South East England and London (1994-1999)
- Member state: United Kingdom
- Created: 1994
- Dissolved: 1999
- MEPs: 1

Prior to its uniform adoption of proportional representation in 1999, the United Kingdom used first-past-the-post for the European elections in England, Scotland and Wales. The European Parliament constituencies used under that system were smaller than the later regional constituencies and only had one Member of the European Parliament each.

The constituency of South Downs West was one of them.

It consisted of the Westminster Parliament constituencies (on their 1983 boundaries) of Arundel, Chichester, East Hampshire, Havant, Horsham, and South West Surrey.

James Provan of the Conservative Party was the sole MEP for the constituency's entire existence.

== MEPs ==
Elected	Member	Party
1994	James Provan	Conservative
1999	Constituency abolished: see South East England	

== Election results ==
European Parliament election, 1994: South Downs West
Party	Candidate	Votes	%	±%
Conservative	James Provan	83,813	43.7	
Liberal Democrats	Dr. James M. M. Walsh	62,746	32.7	
Labour	Mrs. Lynne R. Armstrong	32,344	16.8	
Green	Eric Paine	7,703	4.0	
Liberal	Bill Weights	3,630	1.9	
Natural Law	Paul A. Kember	1,794	0.9	
Majority		21,067	11.0	
Turnout		192,030	39.4	
Conservative win (new seat)				
