= Hampshire North and Oxford (European Parliament constituency) =

Former European Parliament constituency

- European Parliament constituency
- Boundary within South East England and London (1994-1999)
- Member state: United Kingdom
- Created: 1994
- Dissolved: 1999
- MEPs: 1

Prior to its uniform adoption of proportional representation in 1999, the United Kingdom used first-past-the-post for the European elections in England, Scotland and Wales. The European Parliament constituencies used under that system were smaller than the later regional constituencies and only had one Member of the European Parliament each.

The constituency of Hampshire North and Oxford was one of them.

It consisted of the Westminster Parliament constituencies of Aldershot, Basingstoke, Newbury, North West Hampshire, Oxford East, Oxford West and Abingdon, and Wantage.

== MEPs ==
Election	Member	Party
1994	Graham Mather	Conservative

== Election results ==
European Parliament election, 1994: Hampshire North and Oxford
Party	Candidate	Votes	%	±%
Conservative	Graham Mather	72,209	35.8	
Liberal Democrats	Mrs. Jo A. Hawkins	63,015	31.3	
Labour	John S. Tanner	48,525	24.1	
UKIP	David G.J. Wilkinson	8,377	4.2	
Green	Mike Woodin	7,310	3.6	
Natural Law	Hugh R.A. Godfrey	1,027	0.5	
Boston Tea Party	Richard Boston	1,018	0.5	
Majority		9,194	4.5	
Turnout		201,481		
Conservative win (new seat)				
