= Buckinghamshire and Oxfordshire East (European Parliament constituency) =

Former European Parliament constituency

- European Parliament constituency
- Boundary within the East of England (1994-1999)
- Member state: United Kingdom
- Created: 1994
- Dissolved: 1999
- MEPs: 1

Prior to its uniform adoption of proportional representation in 1999, the United Kingdom used first-past-the-post for the European elections in England, Scotland and Wales. The European Parliament constituencies used under that system were smaller than the later regional constituencies and only had one Member of the European Parliament each.

The constituency of Buckinghamshire and Oxfordshire East was one of them.

It consisted of the Westminster Parliament constituencies (on their 1983 boundaries) of Aylesbury, Banbury, Beaconsfield, Buckingham, Chesham and Amersham, Henley, and Wycombe.

== Members of the European Parliament ==
Election	Member	Party
1994	James Elles	Conservative
1999	Constituency abolished: see South East England	

== Election results ==
European Parliament election, 1994: Buckinghamshire and Oxfordshire East
Party	Candidate	Votes	%	±%
Conservative	James Elles	77,037	42.3	
Labour	Duncan S.T. Enright	46,372	25.5	
Liberal Democrats	Sharon Bowles	42,836	23.6	
Green	Lee Roach	8,433	4.6	
Liberal	Mrs. Alison C. Micklem	5,111	2.8	
Natural Law	Geoffrey Clements	2,156	1.2	
Majority		30,665	16.8	
Turnout		181,945		
Conservative win (new seat)				
