= Alex Phillips (TV presenter) =

British journalist and politician (born 1983)

Alexandra Phillips
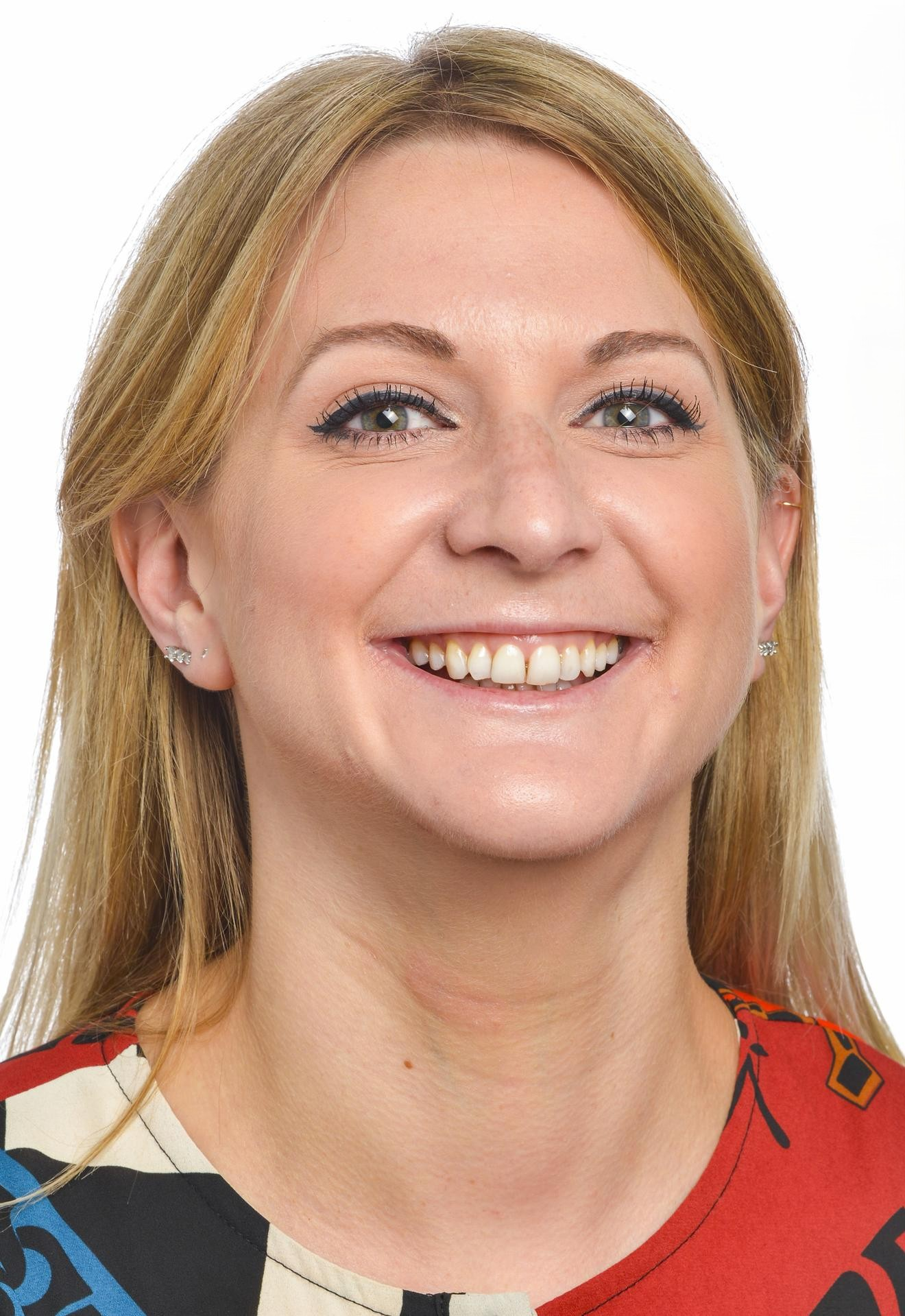
- Phillips in 2019

Member of the European Parliament for South East England
- In office 2 July 2019 – 31 January 2020
- Preceded by: Diane James
- Succeeded by: Constituency abolished

Personal details
- Born: Alexandra Lesley Phillips; 26 December 1983 (age 42) Gloucester, England
- Party: Reform UK (since 2023)
- Other political affiliations: Brexit (2019–2020); Conservative (2016–2019); UK Independence Party (before 2016)
- Education: St Mary's College, Durham; Cardiff University
- Occupation: Broadcaster; journalist; politician

Alexandra Lesley Phillips (born 26 December 1983) is a British journalist, broadcaster, and former Brexit Party politician.

Phillips was a member of the European Parliament (MEP) for the South East England constituency from 2019 to 2020, representing the Brexit Party. She was the second candidate on the Brexit party's list for the constituency after party leader Nigel Farage. In February 2023, Phillips joined Reform UK. In July 2023, she joined the streaming service Talk.

== Early life and career ==
Alexandra Lesley Phillips was born on 26 December 1983 in Gloucester. She has an older brother. Her early education was at Denmark Road High School and Sir Thomas Rich's School in Gloucester. She studied English literature and philosophy at St. Mary's College, Durham University, and broadcast journalism at Cardiff University.

Phillips made a film about the UK Independence Party (UKIP) as a student journalist while covering the 2007 National Assembly for Wales election. She reported that this experience was an important factor in her later joining the party as she was enthralled by then leader Nigel Farage's personality, and supported the party's positions on the expansion of grammar schools, supporting fracking, and Euroscepticism. Prior to joining UKIP, Phillips had worked as a local journalist for ITV, and later BBC Wales.

== Political career ==
Phillips worked as UKIP's head of media for three years. Soon after the 2016 United Kingdom European Union membership referendum in which she voted for Brexit, she left UKIP, at around the same time as Farage, and in September joined the Conservatives, a few weeks after Theresa May had been elected as leader. She stayed on as a media advisor to Nathan Gill, a UKIP MEP and Welsh Assembly member who had become an independent in the Assembly after being beaten by Neil Hamilton for the position of group leader there. She explained her reasons for joining the Conservative Party as her admiration for then Prime Minister Theresa May's positions on Brexit, grammar schools, fracking, and the infighting within UKIP.

In May 2019, Phillips was announced as the Brexit Party's candidate for the South East England constituency in the European parliamentary election. A Green Party candidate also named Alexandra Phillips stood in the same constituency. Both were elected. On 30 May 2019, less than a week after the election, Phillips appeared on the panel of the BBC's weekly Question Time. In July of the same year, Phillips admitted to working for SCL Group, the parent company of Cambridge Analytica, on Kenyan President Uhuru Kenyatta's successful 2017 re-election campaign. She had previously denied working for Cambridge Analytica, but said the work she did was sub-contracted out by SCL. Cambridge Analytica was a British political consulting firm that closed in 2018 after being found to have harvested millions of Facebook users' data without their consent for political advertising. In the European Parliament, Phillips was a member of the Committee on Development, and was part of the Delegation for relations with South Africa.

On 2 August 2019, Phillips was selected as the Brexit Party's prospective parliamentary candidate (PPC) for Southampton Itchen. However, on 11 November 2019, the Brexit Party announced that it would not stand in incumbent Conservative seats. The following day, Phillips announced that she would not be voting in the general election as she had been "disenfranchised" by her party. Her term as MEP ended in January 2020 when the United Kingdom withdrew from the European Union. In February 2023, she joined Reform UK (the successor to the Brexit Party) as a policy adviser to deputy party leader Richard Tice.

== Broadcasting career ==
Phillips presented a twice-weekly show on talkRADIO and is a contributor to The Daily Telegraph. She co-hosted an afternoon programme on GB News with Simon McCoy between June and August 2021. After McCoy moved to the breakfast show, she was given her own show, The Afternoon Agenda, in August 2021. She left GB News in September 2022 after her show was cancelled. Phillips joined Talk in July 2023.

She was a guest on the first The Liz Truss Show on 5 December 2025.
