= Judith Bunting =

British politician (born 1960)

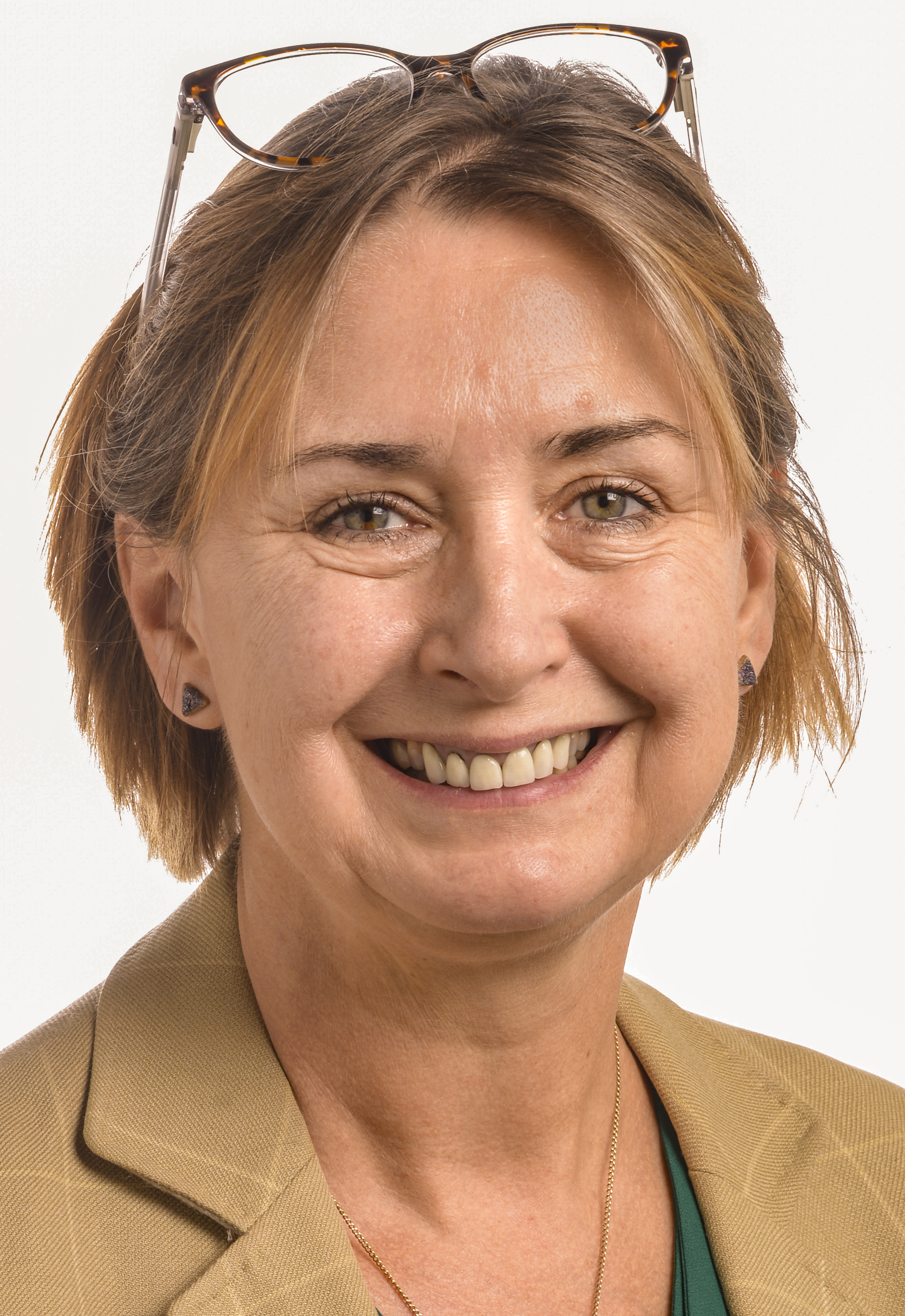

Member of the European Parliament for South East England
- In office 2 July 2019 – 31 January 2020
- Preceded by: Richard Ashworth
- Succeeded by: Constituency abolished

Personal details
- Born: Dogsthorpe, Peterborough
- Education: Fitzwilliam College, Cambridge

Judith Ann Bunting is a television producer and politician who served as a Liberal Democrat Member of the European Parliament (MEP) for the South East England from 2019 to 2020. In 2014, she was chosen by the Royal Society of Chemistry to be one of their 175 Faces of Chemistry.

== Early life ==
She had a sister, Janette. They grew up in Dogsthorpe, Peterborough.

Bunting attended Peterborough County Grammar School for Girls, then Fitzwilliam College, Cambridge, where she obtained a Master's Degree in Natural Sciences (Chemistry). Her father taught Mechanical Engineering at Peterborough Regional College.

== Career ==
=== Television ===
Bunting has been a producer of educational and science-based documentary television since the 1990s. Her early producing credits include the BBC series Tomorrow's World, Teen Species, Horizon and Robert Winston's The Secret Life of Twins and Superhuman.

She produced three series of the series Body Hits and the RTS Award-winning Breast Cancer - the Operation for BBC3.

In 2007, she was series producer for the BBC Wales series, The Museum. She followed this by executive producing Rocket Science for BBC2 and Headshrinkers of the Amazon for the National Geographic Channel. Her 2009 documentary for the National Geographic Channel, The Neanderthal Code was nominated for a Grierson Award for Best Science Documentary.

Since 2013, Bunting has been series producer for production company Remark! on over 30 episodes of Magic Hands, a programme for CBeebies featuring poetry and Shakespeare for children translated entirely into British Sign Language, in which the presenters are all profoundly deaf.

=== Politics ===
In the 2015 and 2017 UK General Elections, Bunting stood as the Liberal Democrat candidate for Newbury and both times coming second to Richard Benyon. She has consistently pursued a broader engagement with science in politics and education. In September 2017, Bunting ruled out a third run as the Liberal Democrat parliamentary candidate for Newbury to "focus on her career as a television producer".

Bunting was elected as a Liberal Democrat MEP for the South East England in the 2019 European Elections. She took the role of Vice President of the European Union's Delegation for relations with the Korean Peninsula (DKOR), opening negotiations for a three way cultural tour with the North Korean Embassy in London. She was the Liberal Democrat Spokesperson for Education and Culture in Europe, and also sat on the Industry, Research and Energy committee.

== Personal life ==
She lives in Newbury, Berkshire.
