= John Howarth (politician) =

British politician

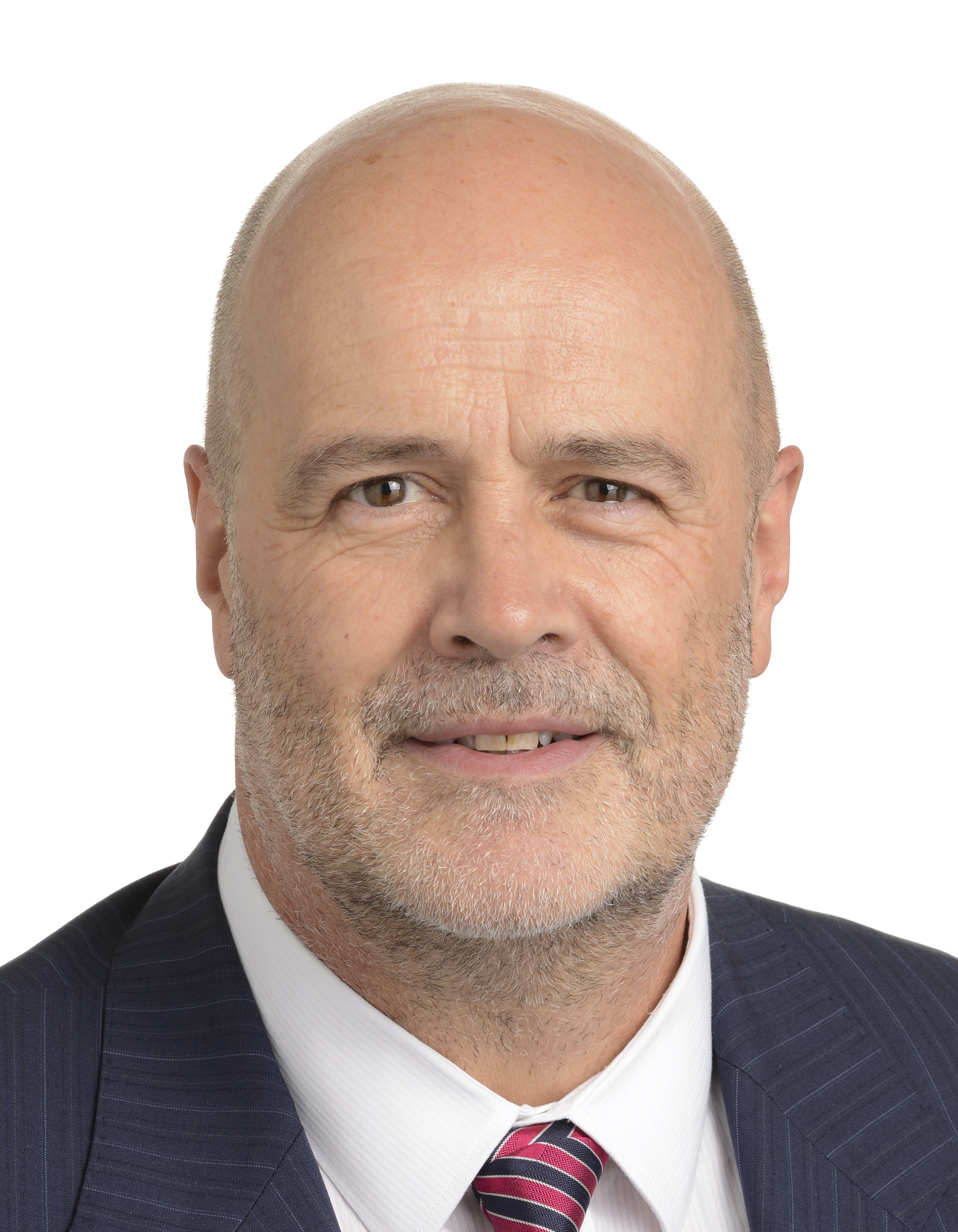

Member of the European Parliament for South East England
- In office 30 June 2017 – 31 January 2020
- Preceded by: Anneliese Dodds
- Succeeded by: Constituency abolished

Personal details
- Born: 31 October 1958 (age 67) Newcastle-upon-Tyne
- Party: Labour
- Spouse: Jane Coney
- Children: Two from first marriage and a step daughter
- Education: University of Essex
- Profession: Designer

John Howarth (born 31 October 1958) is a British Labour Party politician who served as a member of the European Parliament (MEP) for South East England from 2017 to 2020.

== Early life and education ==
John Howarth grew up in Gateshead and attended local schools, including Highfield Comprehensive (later Thomas Hepburn Community School). He studied Economics at the University of Essex and completed a master’s degree in the History of Art, focusing on Werner Herzog's work.

His father, also John Howarth, worked in the coal industry, and his mother, Freda Howarth (née Robinson), was an industrial conscript during World War II. Freda's father, Joe Robinson, a pit deputy and World War I veteran, significantly influenced Howarth’s early political thinking.

== Political life ==
John Howarth joined the Labour Party during the February 1974 General Election and later became National Secretary of Labour Students. After university, he worked as a Labour organiser and settled in Reading in 1988. He served as Chair of Reading Labour Party (1990–1994) and Press Officer for a decade, while also holding regional and national roles within the party.

== Working life ==
After leaving Labour in 1989, Howarth worked in IT marketing before founding Public Impact in 1995. He also worked as public affairs consultant for Instinctif Partners and wrote as a columnist.

== Local government ==
In 1993 he won the Redlands Division seat on Berkshire County Council, he served until its dissolution in 1998. He held leadership roles and advocated for the Council's replacement with a unitary local government.

Elected in 2001 to Reading Borough Council for Park Ward and re-elected in 2004, he held key roles in transport and strategic planning, secured funding for Reading railway station improvements, and served on regional committees. He stepped down in 2007.

== European Parliament ==
In the 1994 European elections, Howarth unsuccessfully contested the Thames Valley seat. He ran for South East England constituency in 1999 and 2014, narrowly missing election in 2014. However, he took up a seat in the European Parliament in 2017 when Anneliese Dodds stepped down to take up the Oxford East seat in the UK parliament following the 2017 General Election. In the 2019 European elections, he was reelected Labour’s sole MEP for South East England.

Howarth served on committees, including Budget (BUDG), Internal Market (IMCO), Regional Development (REGI), and Budgetary Control (CONT). He was Vice Chair of the South Asia Delegation and participated in delegations to CARIFORUM, North Macedonia, and Palestine. He contributed as Rapporteur for the EU’s 2019 Budget and on legislation for the 2021-27 Multiannual Financial Framework, covering the EU Space Programme, Horizon Europe, Creative Europe, and Erasmus+.

== After parliament ==
Howarth is a Senior Advisor to Signum Global Advisors and Senior Counsel at Instinctif Partners. He co-founded Politics Without Borders with Seb Dance and writes the Golfing in the Red Wall newsletter. Now based in Newcastle upon Tyne, he is a trustee for Northumberland CVA.

== Personal life ==
John Howarth is married to Jane Coney, a designer. He has two children from his first marriage and a step daughter. He is a season ticket holder at Newcastle United and follows Reading F.C. as his "second team".
