= Antony Hook =

British politician

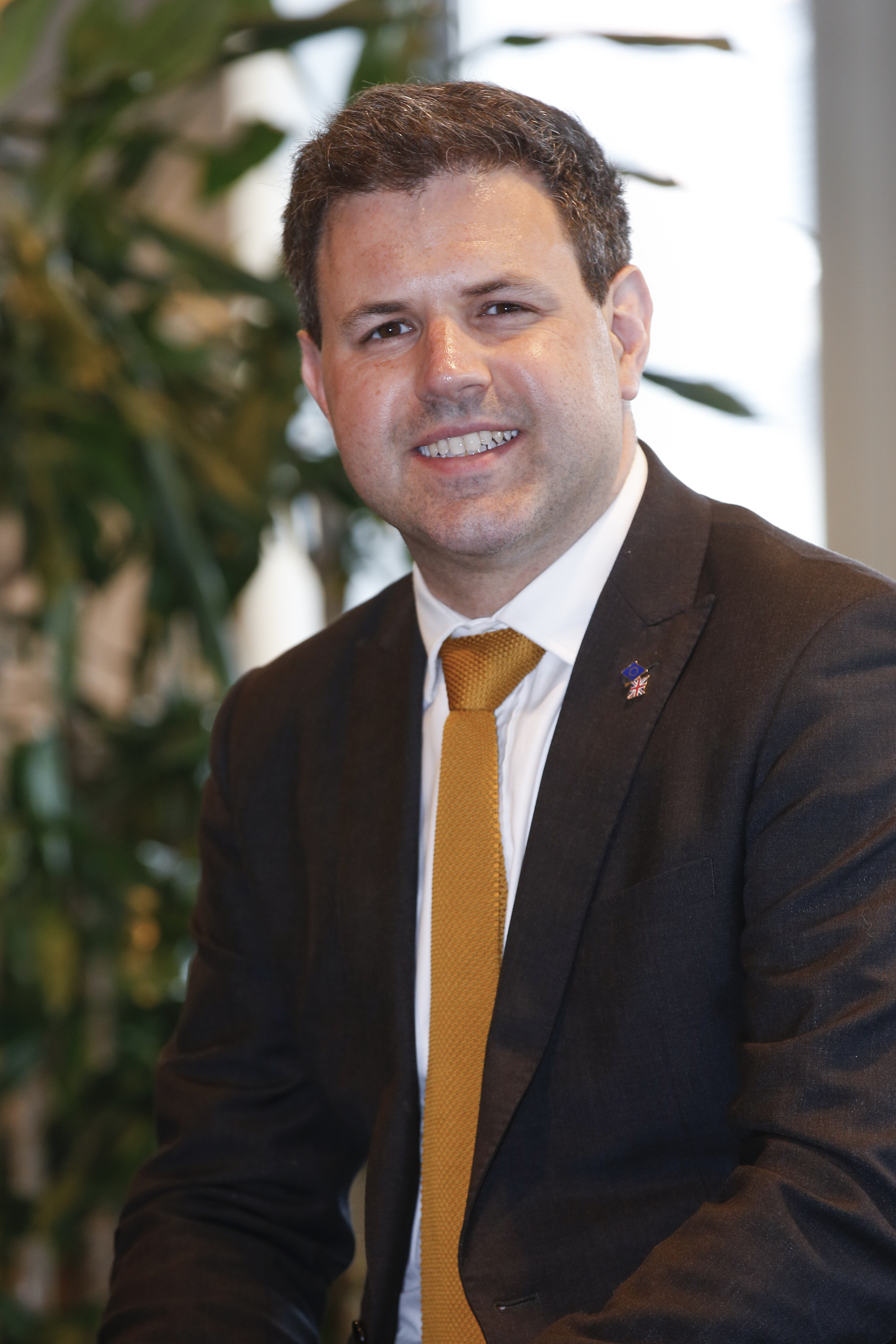
- Hook in 2019

Member of Kent County Council for Faversham
- Incumbent
- Assumed office 5 May 2017
- Preceded by: Tom Gates

Member of the European Parliament for South East England
- In office 2 July 2019 – 31 January 2020
- Preceded by: Janice Atkinson
- Succeeded by: Constituency abolished

Personal details
- Born: 10 April 1980 (age 46)
- Party: Liberal Democrats
- Education: University College London; City, University of London
- Profession: Barrister
- Website: antonyhook.org

Antony James Hook (born 10 April 1980) is a British barrister and politician, who served as a Liberal Democrats Member of the European Parliament (MEP) for the South East England from 2019 to 2020 and is Leader of the Liberal Democrats in Kent since 2021.

== Early life and education ==
Antony Hook was born on 10 April 1980.

He was a pupil at Dover Grammar School for Boys and was President of the association of former students, the Old Pharosians, in 2010-11.

He studied history at University College London, graduating with a Bachelor of Arts (BA) degree in 2001. He went on to study law at City University and undertook the Bar Vocational Course at the Inns of Court School of Law.

He is married and has two daughters.

He joined the Liberal Democrats when he was aged 18.

== Legal career ==
Hook is a barrister at Great James Street Chambers, and formerly worked for the Crown Prosecution Service.

He successfully represented the claimant in R (on the application of Costello) v North East Essex Justices, a judicial review of a decision by Magistrates to try a man, and refuse an adjournment, the day after the man's son had attempted suicide. Following the successful judicial review in the High Court, Mr Justice Collins quashed Costello's conviction on the basis he had not had a fair trial.

In August 2021 he was reported by the Daily Telegraph to be representing the Association of Vehicle Recovery Operators (AVRO) in a dispute with Home Office minister Kit Malthouse over consultation on charges for vehicle recovery. In response to his representations, the Minister extended the consultation period and promised to address AVRO's concerns.

== Local government ==
He is a member of Kent County Council for the Faversham Division since 2017, when he was elected with 41% of the vote. He was he victim of assault the night after the election after seeing a woman who appeared to be pulled along the street by a man and in distress if she was okay.

He is member of Faversham Town Council for Abbey Ward.

He called for Council Tax to be abolished and proposed a motion that led Kent County Council to write to the government asking for the Council Tax system to be reviewed.

In July 2020, he proposed to Kent County Council a motion against racism but the Conservative majority amended the motion and refused to give "unequivocal support" to ethnic minorities.

He was elected to Kent County Council for a second term on 6 May 2021, with 45% of the vote over his Conservative rival Andy Culham on 31%.

Shortly after being re-elected as County Councillor he was elected as Leader of the Liberal Democrats in Kent. He was elected to that role by unanimous vote of Liberal Democrat members of Kent County Council.

Hook was elected to a third term on Kent County Council in May 2025, winning the ward of Faversham with 43.6% of the vote next to second-placed Reform UK candidate Jess Valentine on 25.7%.

== European Parliament ==
He was elected to the 9th European Parliament and served from the start of that parliament in July 2019 until January 2020.

He was a member of the Committee on Civil Liberties, Justice and Home Affairs and the Parliament's delegation for relations with Belarus and delegation to the Euronest Parliamentary Assembly.

In September 2019, when UK Prime Minister Boris Johnson's attempt to prorogue the UK Parliament was annulled by the Supreme Court he said the incident showed the need for a written constitution in the UK.

His term as an MEP ended when the UK left the European Union on 31 January 2020.

A few days before Brexit he drew media attention by unveiling a large "We still love EU" banner" above the White Cliffs of Dover, measuring 150 square metres and crowdfunded from members of the public. The image of the banner was also projected onto cliffs at Ramsgate on 31 January 2020.

His final speech in the European Parliament was on 30 January 2020 in a debate about the Gender Pay Gap. He called for action to reduce the difference between pay of men and women.
