= Mark F. Watts =

British politician

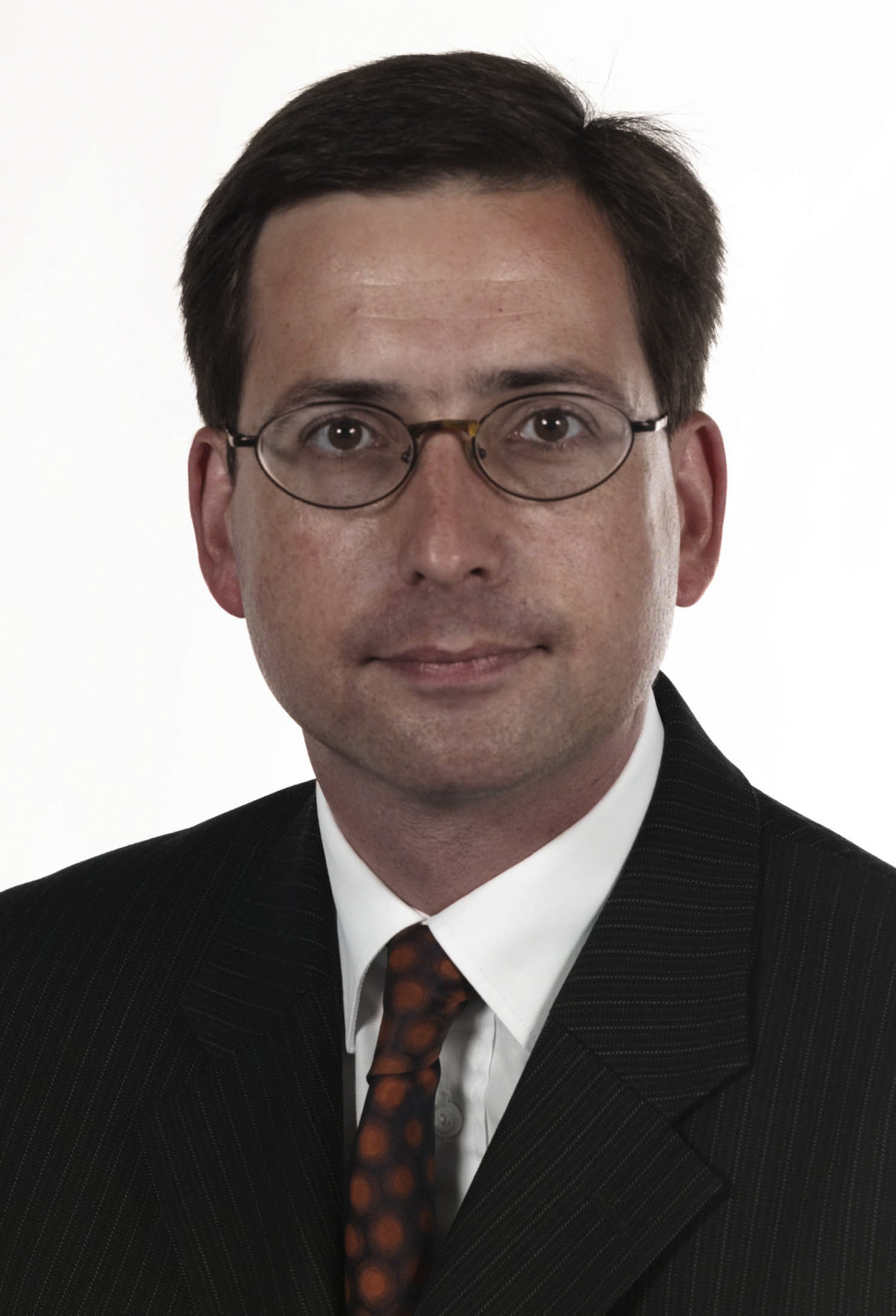
Watts in 1999

Mark Francis Watts (born 11 June 1964, in London), is a former Labour Party Member of the European Parliament (MEP), and now public affairs lobbyist and public relations advisor, having represented Kent East and South East England from 1994 to 2004.

== Early years ==
Watts attended Maidstone Grammar School and MidKent College and studied economics, BSc & MSc (Econ), at the London School of Economics. He worked for the Royal Borough of Kingston upon Thames covering planning, transport and economic development.

== Political life ==
Watts was elected as a Maidstone Borough Councillor in 1986, and became Leader of its Labour Group in 1990. He was elected an MEP in 1994, gaining the East Kent Constituency for Labour from the Conservatives, beating incumbent Christopher Jackson, and stood again successfully for the South East England regional constituency in 1999, but was not re-elected in 2004 when Labour's national performance declined.

He specialised in transport issues, being Labour Transport and Tourism Spokesman in the European Parliament for eight years. He served on the Committee on Transport and Tourism and then the Committee on Regional Policy, Transport and Tourism. He was a champion of enlargement and the application of the Copenhagen Criteria to Central and Eastern and the islands of Malta and Cyprus. He was vice-chair, first of the Delegation to the EU-Bulgaria Joint Parliamentary Committee and then of the Delegation to the EU-Malta Joint Parliamentary Committee. He was Rapporteur on a number of important pieces of EU legislation. He also championed Better Regulation and was appointed by Tony Blair as link MEP to the Cabinet Office (1999–2004). He led the ultimately unsuccessful campaign in the European Parliament to Save Duty Free in the EU.

Watts was a leading supporter of Tony Blair and New Labour. He voted to support the Iraq war that led to the removal of Saddam Hussein.

== Life since the European Parliament ==
Watts was Director of Waterfront Europe, a public affairs consultancy, specialising in transport issues between 2004 and 2009. He is now co-owner and Director of LP Brussels, an integrated communications consultancy inspired by the legend of King Arthur, his castle Camelot, his sword Excaliber and the Knights of the Round Table. He offers strategic pa and pr advice to leading companies, governments and individuals seeking to understand and influence the EU. He was elected a Fellow of the Royal Society for the encouragement of Arts, Manufactures and Commerce (RSA) in 2010. He writes and lectures regularly on a range of international topics.

Watts continues to champion EU enlargement and recently advocated a European Mediterranean Union to include countries in the Middle East and North Africa which guarantee democracy, the rule of law, human rights, and the respect for and protection of minorities.

He advocates an In/out EU membership referendum in the UK which he says "will give us pro-Europeans the chance to make the case for Europe and secure the consent of our generation."

== Red Orchestra Commemoration ==
Watts organised a commemorative event in the European Parliament on Tuesday 6 December 2011, hosted by Peter Skinner, a senior British MEP, to mark the 70th Anniversary of the raid by the German Abwehr on the Red Orchestra Brussels HQ. The Red Orchestra was probably the most successful spy network in WW2. The raid led to the capture, torture, and execution of over 100 agents. The event included a seminar with Hans Coppi, Jr.an expert on the Red orchestra whose parents were members of the RO, and were executed by the Gestapo, Natalia Narochnitskaya Ph.D., Prof., a doctor of historical science, an expert on international relations around WW1 and WW2, and a prominent public figure in Russia, Rabbi Avil Tawil, Director of the European Jewish Community Centre in Brussels, and Lital Levin, an Israeli journalist and relative of Leopold Trepper. Other experts and relatives of the Red orchestra and the Resistance also contributed to the seminar. There was a commemorative reception. The Russian Ambassador to the EU, H.E. Vladimir Chizhov, was guest of honour. The British Ambassador to Belgium, Jonathan Brenton, the Israeli Ambassador to Belgium H.E. Jacques Revah, and the German Ambassador to Belgium H.E.Eckart Cuntz attended.
