= Robert Rowland (politician) =

British politician (1966–2021)

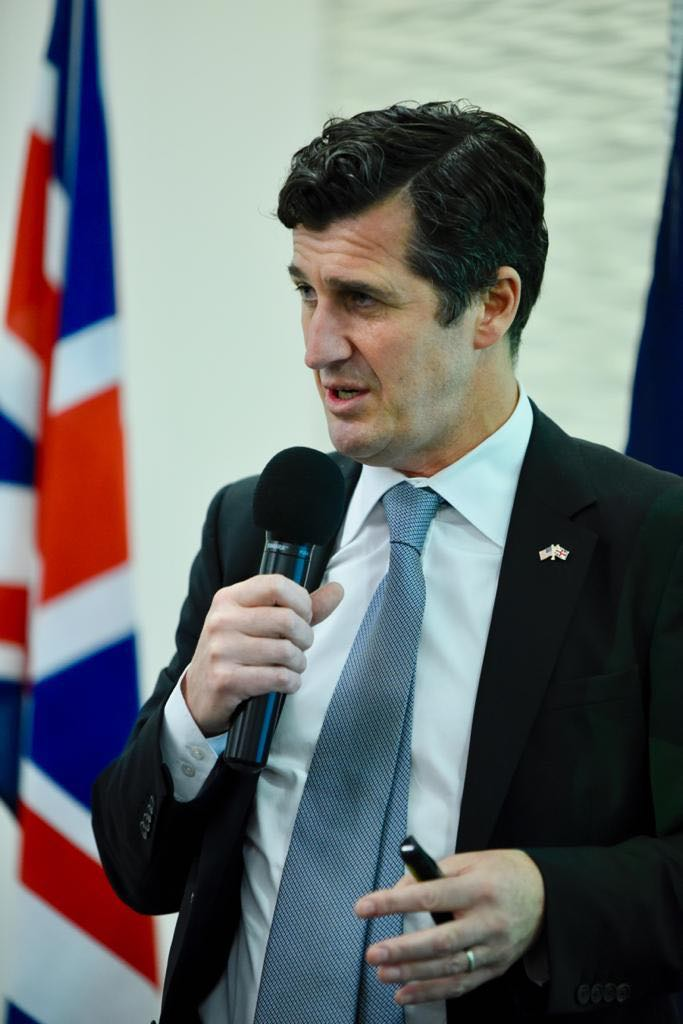
- Rowland in 2020

Member of the European Parliament for South East England
- In office 2 July 2019 – 31 January 2020
- Preceded by: Ray Finch
- Succeeded by: Constituency abolished

Personal details
- Born: Robert Andrew Rowland; 28 February 1966 Bowdon, Greater Manchester, England
- Died: 23 January 2021 (aged 54) The Bahamas
- Party: Brexit
- Spouse: Lisa Marie
- Children: 4
- Education: Sedbergh School; Newcastle University

Robert Andrew Rowland (28 February 1966 – 23 January 2021) was a British politician who served as a Brexit Party Member of the European Parliament (MEP) for South East England from 2019 until the United Kingdom's exit from the EU in 2020. He was a member of the Committee on Economic and Monetary Affairs and was a substitute on the Committee for Industry, Research and Energy.

== Early career ==
Rowland attended Sedbergh School in Cumbria and graduated from Newcastle University in 1988 with a BA (Hons) and began his career in the investment industry. Rowland was a fund manager with Odey Asset Management before becoming a director at Soros Fund Management. He then moved to New York, where he became a partner at Cheyne Capital Management (UK). Rowland was a director of the charity 'Tickets for Troops'. The charity distributes free tickets to members of the armed forces for a variety of sporting, musical and cultural events.

== Political career ==
Rowland's first introduction to politics was while he was studying at the University of Newcastle. He stood for Deputy President of the Students' Union in 1987, and on failing to win that position, the 5 March 1987 issue of the student newspaper, the Courier, reports that he stood unopposed for election for the Convener of the Disciplinary Committee, but lost by 335 votes to 395 against "Re-open Nominations (R.O.N)."

In the 10 March 1988 edition of the Courier, he wrote a letter directed at what he dubbed "the fascist left," defending freedom of speech, and opposing the practice of providing "no platform" to speakers whose views were considered objectionable by some.

In 2019, Rowland chose to return to politics, and at a European level, by standing as a candidate for the Brexit Party. Rowland gave his first major speech as a candidate at the Lakeside Hotel in Frimley, Surrey, in May of that year, where he described opposition to Brexit as a potential "coup against democracy".

Rowland was elected third on the Brexit Party list for the South East of England in the European Parliament elections in May 2019. He sat on the ECON (Economic and Monetary Affairs) committee in the European Parliament.

Rowland was a climate change denier. In a speech on 23 October 2019 he said "decarbonisation is deindustrialisation. It amounts to unilateral disarmament." He argued that decarbonisation policies replace tax revenues generated from fossil fuels with subsidies to the detriment of the funding public services.

Writing for the Daily Telegraph in September 2019, Rowland warned that the UK was giving up a claim to accumulated profits from the European Investment Bank in the proposed European Union withdrawal agreement. In the same article he also argued that large eurozone liabilities and the highly leveraged way that the Bank lends puts it at risk of a banking crisis.

On 9 July 2019, Rowland's Twitter activities received national attention when he tweeted at David Lammy, MP: "Lammy, you're [sic] first port of call should be the Chicago School of Economics. Complete 3 years and then you might understand 10% of what we all understand. Ignorance and race baiting is your signature tune." Twitter users pointed out that the Chicago School of Economics is not an actual university, but a school of thought; and that American degrees would in any case require four years, not three. David Lammy also said that he had, in fact, attended Harvard University.

The following day, on 10 July 2019, Rowland tweeted: "We are behind all our fisherman and the restoration of sovereignty over our waters. 200 miles of exclusion zone with any foreign fishing vessel given the same treatment as the Belgrano! Well done June. We are 110% behind you and will ensure you give ‘em hell on committee." His threat to sink foreign civilian fishing vessels was widely shared and criticised on social media.

On 9 October 2020, Rowland spoke in favour of re-electing Donald Trump in the 2020 United States presidential election in a debate at the Durham Union Society.

== Personal life ==
Rowland was married to Lisa Marie. Together, they had three sons and one daughter. The youngest son Alex is a pro golfer

Rowland died on 23 January 2021, on holiday in the Bahamas. He was 54, and drowned in a diving accident.
