= Belinda de Lucy =

British politician (born 1976)

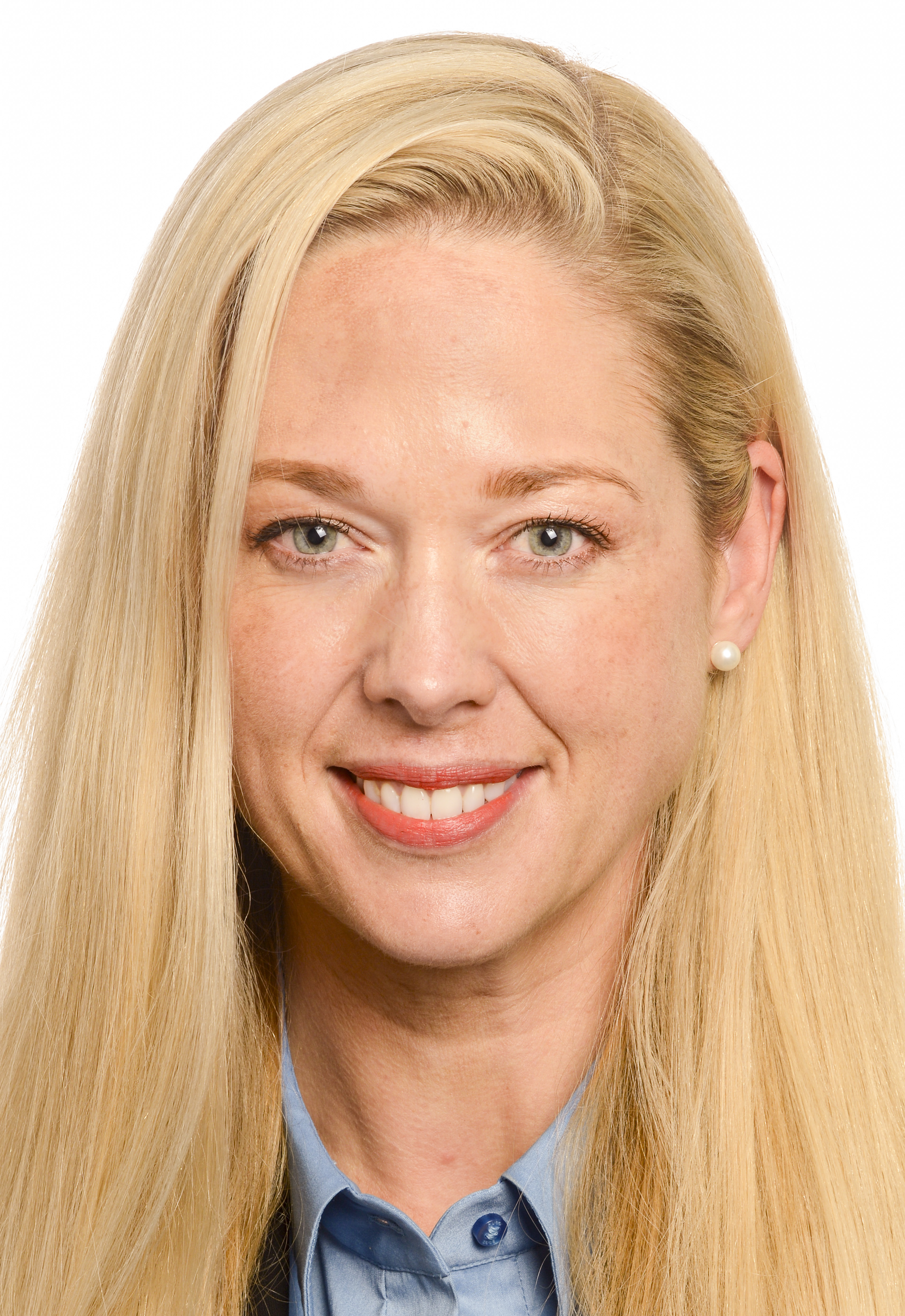

Member of the European Parliament for South East England
- In office 2 July 2019 – 31 January 2020
- Preceded by: Nirj Deva
- Succeeded by: Constituency abolished

Personal details
- Born: 15 October 1976 (age 49) Sheffield, South Yorkshire, England
- Party: Reform UK
- Spouse: Raymond McKeeve
- Children: 4
- Occupation: Politician

Belinda Claire De Camborne Lucy (born 15 October 1976) is a British politician who was Reform UK's Education and Families spokesperson from 2023–2026. She was previously a Brexit Party Member of the European Parliament (MEP) for South East England from 2019 to 2020. In the European Parliament, she was a member of the Committee on Women's Rights and Gender Equality, and part of the delegation to the EU–Russia Parliamentary Cooperation Committee.

== Early life ==
Belinda Claire De Camborne Lucy was born in Sheffield, South Yorkshire, on 15 October 1976. Her great-grandfather was Edward Selby Little, a missionary in China, and a co-founder of the resort town of Guling, Jiujiang.

== Political career ==
In the 2016 United Kingdom European Union membership referendum de Lucy campaigned for Brexit with the Leave Means Leave and Ladies for Leave groups. In the 2019 European parliamentary election she stood as a candidate for the Brexit Party in the South East England constituency. She was fourth on her party's list and was elected as one of its four MEPs in the constituency. In the European Parliament she was a member of the Committee on Women's Rights and Gender Equality, and part of the delegation to the EU–Russia Parliamentary Cooperation Committee.

In March 2023 de Lucy was appointed as Education and Families spokesperson for Reform UK (successor to the Brexit Party). She was replaced in this role by Suella Braverman in February 2026 following Braverman's defection to Reform UK from the Conservative Party the previous month.

== Personal life ==
De Lucy is married to Raymond McKeeve and they have four children. McKeeve is a senior partner at corporate firm Dial Partners. He was a senior advisor at the legal firm Avonhurst, group chief transaction and legal officer at Cingo Global, and a part-time senior advisor and non-executive director at Azura Partners, and a private equity specialist and corporate finance partner at the law firm Jones Day. Avonhurst was set up by a former Jones Day partner in July 2019. McKeeve had left Jones Day in 2020 after being accused of contempt of court. The charge stemmed from his advice to one of the founders of Ocado to "burn" a messaging application after receiving a High Court search order in July 2019. He denied the charge but suggested that he had done so to protect his wife from potential litigation. McKeeve was subsequently fined £25,000 and ordered to pay a further £610,353 in legal costs to Ocado in October 2022 after being found guilty of contempt of court in August 2022.

De Lucy was a trustee of the charity Give Us Time, which was founded by former Secretary of State for Defence Liam Fox in 2012.
