= Nirj Deva =

British politician (born 1948)

Nirj Deva FRSA DL
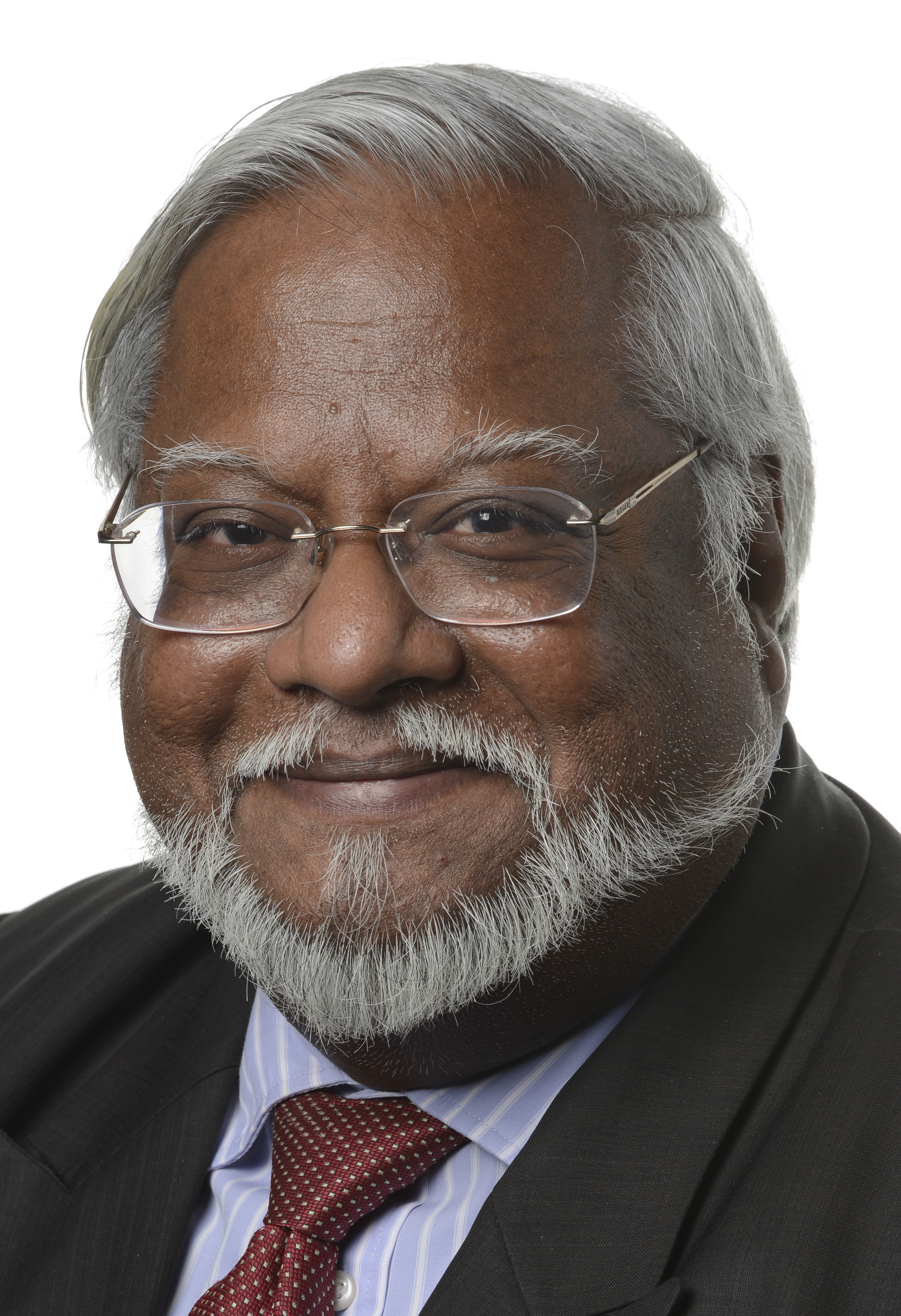

Member of the European Parliament for South East England
- In office 10 June 1999 – 1 July 2019
- Preceded by: Position established
- Succeeded by: Belinda de Lucy

Member of Parliament for Brentford and Isleworth
- In office 9 April 1992 – 8 April 1997
- Preceded by: Barney Hayhoe
- Succeeded by: Ann Keen

Personal details
- Born: Niranjan Joseph De Silva Deva Aditya; 11 May 1948 (age 78) Colombo, Dominion of Ceylon
- Citizenship: Sri Lanka and United Kingdom
- Party: Conservative
- Other political affiliations: European Conservatives and Reformists
- Spouse: Indra
- Children: 1
- Website: www.nirjdeva.co.uk European Parliament

Niranjan Joseph De Silva Deva Aditya (born 11 May 1948), known as Nirj Deva, is a British politician. A member of the Conservative Party, he served as a Member of the European Parliament for South East England from 1999 to 2019. He was a Member of Parliament (MP) in the British House of Commons from 1992 to 1997, for the seat of Brentford and Isleworth.

Deva was born in Sri Lanka into a politically active family and was raised in Britain. He was the fifth Asian-born person to be elected a Member of the House of Commons, and in 1999 became the second so-born to be elected as a Conservative to the European Parliament which operates via a party list system. In November 2011 Deva became the European Conservatives and Reformists Group's candidate for President of the European Parliament, following three UN-related roles, representing the European Union, in the 2005 to 2006 period.

== Family background and education ==
Deva was born in Colombo, Sri Lanka, to a leading family of Rajasthani (Indian) descent, and is a Roman Catholic. His grandfather was a Senator in the first Sri Lankan (Ceylon) Parliament. Deva's father was Dr. Kingsley De Silva Deva Aditya, a prominent eye surgeon in Colombo, Sri Lanka. His mother Zita was the daughter of Dr. M. G. Perera, a member of the Senate in then Ceylon. He spent his primary and secondary education at St. Joseph's College, a Catholic school in Colombo. He holds Sri Lankan and British citizenship, and speaks Sinhala and English.

Deva was educated at Loughborough University, where he completed a degree in Aeronautical Engineering and was subsequently a Postgraduate Research Fellow in Economics.

== British Parliament ==
Deva stood as the Conservative Party candidate in Hammersmith at the 1987 general election but lost by 2,415 votes to sitting Labour MP Clive Soley.

At the 1992 general election, Deva was elected to the House of Commons as MP for the London constituency of Brentford and Isleworth with a majority of 2,086. During his time in Parliament, Deva served as a Parliamentary private secretary (PPS) at the Scottish Office. Deva was only the fifth Asian-born person to be elected a Member of the House of Commons and serve in the British Government.

He was defeated in the 1997 general election, losing to the Labour candidate Ann Keen by 14,424 votes.

== European Parliament ==
Deva was chosen by the Conservatives to be one of their candidates for the South East England at the 1999 European Parliament election. This was to be the first European election in the UK to use the closed party-list proportional representation electoral system and Deva was placed fifth amongst the eleven Conservatives candidates in South East England. Following the election the Conservatives were entitled to five MEPs from South East England and therefore Deva was elected to the European Parliament. Deva became the first Asian-born person to be elected as a Conservative member of the European Parliament. At the 2004 European Parliament election Deva was moved up to second place on the Conservatives' list of candidates for South East England. After the election the Conservatives were entitled to four MEPs from South East England and therefore Deva was re-elected to the European Parliament.

In April 2005 he was chairman of the European Parliament's delegation to the UN Commission on Sustainable Development in New York, and delivered a paper on the future of the United Nations at the US Council on Foreign Relations. A few months later, he headed the European Parliament's delegation to the UN High-Level Conference on global financing of aid. Also in 2005 he was Co-Chairman (with former Prime Minister of France Michel Rocard) of the European Parliaments' Delegation to the World Summit at the United Nations 60th General Assembly.

At the 2009 European Parliament election Deva was placed third on the Conservatives' list of candidates for South East England. After the election the Conservatives were entitled to four MEPs from South East England and therefore Deva was re-elected to the European Parliament.

In November 2011 it was announced that Deva would be the European Conservatives and Reformists Group's candidate for President of the European Parliament. In the election in January 2012 he was backed by 142 MEPs, compared to the S&D winning candidate Martin Schulz, backed by 387 MEPs.

At the 2014 European Parliament election Deva was ranked one spot higher for the same EU region. Following the election the Conservatives were entitled to three MEPs from South East England and therefore Deva was re-elected to the European Parliament. After the election mainstream Sri Lankan media falsely reported Deva had increased "his share" of the vote: electors vote for the party, not the candidate, and Conservative votes and share of the vote decreased.

Deva serves as co-ordinator on the Committee on Overseas Development and Cooperation, and is a bureau member of the ACP-EU Joint Parliamentary Assembly. He is also a member of the Committee on Foreign Affairs of the European Parliament. He has established an online campaign calling for a referendum on the European Constitution (www.giveusareferendum.eu), and launched an online survey asking the views of his constituents on the future of the EU (www.southeastsurvey.eu).

== Lobbying ==
Whilst an MP Deva served as a consultant for tobacco manufacturer Rothmans, builders Laing and power station equipment manufacturer KHD. Following the cash-for-questions affair Deva was amongst a number of MPs who were investigated by an official inquiry led by Gordon Downey. The inquiry found that Deva had no case to answer.

Deva used an official European Parliament trip to Barbados in 2009 to promote Symphony Environmental Technologies, a company from which he received £33,000 a year for being its chairman.

Deva lobbies extensively for the Sri Lankan government and founded the Friends of Sri Lanka group in the European Parliament. He is regarded as an unofficial "Ambassador-at-Large for Sri Lanka".

== Business interests ==
=== Sri Lanka ===
Deva's family has extensive business interests in Sri Lanka including tea, rubber and coconut plantations as well as a distillery and residential property. Deva is a director of Waulugalle Distilleries Limited, Serene Residencies (Private) Limited and the family trust.

Deva holds directorships of a number of Sri Lanka's largest companies. He is a director of conglomerate Aitken Spence PLC. He was appointed a non-executive director of Aitken Spence Hotel Holdings PLC, a subsidiary of Aitken Spence PLC, with effect from 1 July 2010. He was appointed to the board of directors of MTD Walkers PLC with effect from 29 February 2012. He is a director of Distilleries Company of Sri Lanka PLC and its subsidiary Melstacorp Limited. He is also a director of The Kingsbury PLC (formerly Hotel Services (Ceylon) PLC), a subsidiary of Hayleys PLC.

=== United Kingdom ===
Deva is a shareholder, director and chairman of Symphony Environmental Technologies PLC, a company listed on the Alternative Investment Market. He received a salary of £42,000 in 2013 for being chairman. He is also a director of two of the company's subsidiaries, Symphony Recycling Technologies Limited and Symphony Plastics (2010) Limited. He is also currently director of Deva Imperial Limited, Monte Zita Limited and Stassen Teas Limited. He had previously been director of Airlines of the World Limited, Budget Hotels Limited, CMB Technologies Limited, Corporate and Public Affairs Strategy Limited, First European Communications Corporation Limited, Global Business Link Limited, International Management Consulting Group Limited, P.P.A.I. Limited, Policy Research Centre for Business Limited, Project Management (Balaton) Limited, Serendib Business Investments Limited, Speed Promotions Limited, Winfotech Europe Limited and World Corporate Travel Buyers Club Limited.

== Other roles and activities ==
In 1981, Deva became Chairman of the Bow Group, a conservative think tank in Great Britain, and initiated the Transatlantic Conferences between the Bow Group and the Republican Party and The Heritage Foundation in Washington, D.C.

Deva was appointed Chairman of the Department of Transport and National Consumer Council Committee on Deregulation of Air Transport, whose report was published by the UK Government in March 1986. This resulted in the low-fare airlines in Europe.

Deva was a Member of the Council of the Royal Commonwealth Society from 1976 to 1980. In 1985, he became the first Asian-born person to be appointed by Queen Elizabeth II to the office of Deputy lieutenant for Greater London – a position which he holds for life. He is a Fellow of Britain's Royal Society of Arts, President of the EU-India Chamber of Commerce, and a Patron of the International Monarchist League. Deva has backed many important education and health issues – he is a staunch supporter of the Autism Awareness Campaign UK and in Sri Lanka.

In 2006 Deva tried to become a candidate for the post of Secretary-General of the United Nations. Deva claimed to have received the recommendation of Fijian Foreign Minister Kaliopate Tavola, a claim refuted by Fiji. He tried unsuccessfully to receive the endorsement of Sri Lankan President Mahinda Rajapaksa. The British government also refused to support Deva. With so little support Deva didn't go forward as an official candidate.

Since 2008 Deva has served as the President of the International Committee on Human Dignity for the Rome-based Dignitatis Humanae Institute, and is also the Vice-President of the European Parliament's Working Group on Human Dignity since its launch in 2009.

== Family life ==
Deva is married to Indra – a French-speaking Mauritian. Indra has worked as Deva's personal assistant since he was elected an MP in 1992. As of 2009 Indra was earning a salary of £30,000-£39,999 for working as one of Deva's assistants in the European Parliament.

The couple have one son.

Parliament of the United Kingdom
| Preceded by Barney Hayhoe | Member of Parliament for Brentford and Isleworth; 1992–1997 | Succeeded by Ann Keen |
