= James Provan =

British farmer, businessman and politician

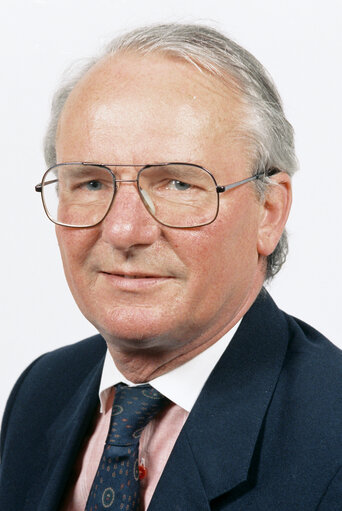

Member of the European Parliament for South Downs West
- In office 1994–2004

Member of the European Parliament for North East Scotland
- In office 1979–1989
- Preceded by: New constituency
- Succeeded by: Henry McCubbin

Personal details
- Born: 19 December 1936 (age 88) Scotland
- Political party: Conservative

James Lyal Clark Provan (born 19 December 1936) is a British farmer, businessman and politician who served four terms as a Member of the European Parliament (MEP). A member of the Conservative Party, he specialised in agriculture, and became a critic of the development of the European Union and especially of the European Commission.

== Family and education ==
Provan was born in Scotland and attended Ardvreck School in Crieff before going to Oundle School, a public school in Northamptonshire. Rather than pursue an academic career he went on to the Royal Agricultural College in Cirencester. In 1960 he married Roweena Lewis; they have a daughter and twin sons.

== Perthshire ==
In 1965 Provan became area President of Perthshire for the National Farmers Union of Scotland, a position which he also held in 1971. He was an active member of the Conservative Party in Perth and East Perthshire, being Treasurer of the local association from 1975 to 1977. He was a member of the Lord Lieutenant's Queen's Jubilee Appeal Committee in 1977.

== Political career ==
Provan was elected to Tayside Regional Council in 1978, serving on the Tay River Purification Board. He was selected to be the Conservative Party candidate for North East Scotland for the 1979 European Parliament election, and won the seat despite only obtaining 33% of the vote when his opponents divided the rest evenly.

=== Agriculture committee ===
Immediately appointed to the Agriculture and Fisheries Committee, in March 1980 Provan voted against a proposal to increase farm prices by 7.9% because of its consequential increase in the European budget requirement and the proportion devoted to agricultural subsidies. That May he was a rapporteur on a report calling for a full intervention scheme in the mutton and lamb market, which had been passed by 11 votes to 10 after French pressure and against British resistance. The Commission rejected the proposal. Provan became the European Democrat group spokesman on agriculture in 1982.

Provan sponsored an emergency motion in September 1983 which condemned Greece for blocking a common European response criticising the Soviet Union shooting down of Korean Air Lines Flight 007. He was re-elected in the 1984 election with a slight improvement in his vote but still only polled 34%.

=== Mafia ===
On Provan's initiative the European Parliament set up a team to monitor the effect of milk quota system in 1984. In January 1985 he endorsed the claim of a Sicilian Communist MEP that the Mafia was taking a great deal of European Community funds, stating that three former Members of the European Parliament were involved with the Mafia and that they must also have infiltrated the senior ranks of the European Commission.

== Defeat ==
Provan was elected as a Quaestor in 1987, a job that gave him responsibility for the Parliament's finance and administration. The same year he became a Fellow of the Royal Society of Arts. He published his analysis of the development of the European Community, "The European Community: an ever closer union?", in 1989. However, the unpopularity of the Conservative Party in Scotland made his position especially vulnerable and at the 1989 European election he was defeated, coming in third behind both the Labour Party and the Scottish National Party.

After leaving the European Parliament, Provan went into business, becoming Chairman of McIntosh Donald Ltd and of James McIntosh & Co. He was also executive director of Scottish Financial Enterprise from 1990 to 1991, and became a member of the Agricultural and Food Research Council. From 1992 to 1998 he was chairman of the Rowett Research Institute.

== Retread ==
Having a home in the south of England, Provan was selected as Conservative candidate for South Downs West in the run-up to the 1994 European Parliament election, a much better area for the Conservatives. He was elected with a 21,000 majority and became the Chief Whip for the Conservative Group. The tensions in the group became apparent when it split three ways in a vote on approving the Santer Commission; Provan himself voted against.

=== Animal welfare ===
Provan successfully moved a motion calling for a ban on veal crates and a maximum journey time of eight hours for live cattle being transported across Europe in 1995. During the 1997 general election campaign, he contradicted a claim by the Referendum Party on the extent of gold reserves which the Bank of England would have to transfer for the Pound sterling to join the Euro.

=== Reselection ===
He became a Vice President of the European People's Party and the party's Chief Whip in 1996. In the transition to a regional list system for elections to the European Parliament, Provan was chosen on top of the list for the South East England, attributed to his support for party leader William Hague's position on the single currency. After his re-election, Provan was elected a Vice President of the European Parliament.

Provan's decision to help unveil a Scottish pro-European Union poster alongside members of other parties in October 1999 caused some trouble. Provan reminded his critics that he had voted against the euro and said that he believed Britain should join a successful single European currency. However, Provan pulled out of the event at the last minute, facing reported disciplinary action. He explained that it had not been made clear to him that he was the sole Scottish Conservative representative, and that it was wrong for him to go as his European Parliament constituency was in England.

== Retirement ==
In November 2001 Provan pushed the Agriculture Committee of the European Parliament to undertake an inquiry into the 2001 United Kingdom foot-and-mouth crisis, after the United Kingdom government had refused to hold one. He stood down from the European Parliament in 2004.
