= Graham Mather =

British politician (born 1954)

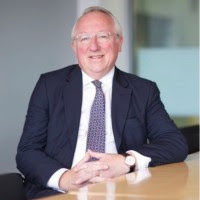
Graham MATHER portrait photo

Graham Christopher Spencer Mather CBE (born 23 October 1954, Preston) is a British former Member of the European Parliament (MEP).He has led a number of think tanks and served on the UK competition authorities and on the boards of economic regulators in several sectors.

Mather was educated at Hutton Grammar School and as an open scholar of New College, Oxford. While there, he became an officer in the Oxford University Conservative Association. He qualified as a solicitor with a firm which subsequently became part of CMS. He was a member of the Westminster City Council 1982–86. He became the first head of the policy unit at the Institute of Directors.

At the 1983 general election, he unsuccessfully stood in Blackburn. From 1987 to 1992 he was General Director of the Institute of Economic Affairs.

He was a Conservative Party Member of the European Parliament (MEP) from 1994 to 1999 for the Hampshire North and Oxford constituency.

He has been a visiting fellow at Nuffield College Oxford.

He served on the Monopolies & Mergers Commission from 1987-93 and the Competition Appeal Tribunal from 2000-2012. He was a board member of the Office of Communication (Ofcom) from 2014-2023 and of the Office of Road & Rail (ORR) from 2016 - 2021. He has been a board member of the Gas & Electricity Markets Authority (Ofgem) since 2023 and is Chairman of its RIIO-3 and ED-3 Committee of Authority.

He is president of the European Policy Forum, which he established in 1992, now including The Infrastructure Forum, The Regulation Forum and European Financial Forum.

Mather was appointed Commander of the Order of the British Empire (CBE) in the 2017 Birthday Honours for services to economic regulation, competition, and infrastructure development.
