= Itchen, Test and Avon (European Parliament constituency) =

Former European Parliament constituency

- European Parliament constituency
- Boundary within South East England and London (1994-1999)
- Member state: United Kingdom
- Created: 1994
- Dissolved: 1999
- MEPs: 1

Prior to its uniform adoption of proportional representation in 1999, the United Kingdom used first-past-the-post for the European elections in England, Scotland and Wales. The European Parliament constituencies used under that system were smaller than the later regional constituencies and only had one Member of the European Parliament each.

The constituency of Itchen, Test and Avon was one of them.

It consisted of the Westminster Parliament constituencies (on their 1983 boundaries) of Christchurch, Eastleigh, New Forest, Romsey and Waterside, Salisbury, Southampton Itchen, and Southampton Test.

== MEPs ==
Election	Member	Party
1994	Edward Kellett-Bowman	Conservative

== Election results ==
Itchen, Test and Avon, European Parliament election, 1994
Party	Candidate	Votes	%
Conservative	Edward Kellett-Bowman	81,456	35.4
Liberal Democrats	A.D. (Tony) Barron	74,553	32.4
Labour	Edward V. Read	52,416	22.7
UKIP	Nigel Farage	12,423	5.4
Green	Fiona Hulbert	7,998	3.5
Natural Law	Adam D. Miller-Smith	1,368	0.6
Majority		6,903	3.0
Turnout		230,214	41.8
Total votes		550,406	100.0
Conservative win (new seat)			
