= James Elles =

British politician (born 1949)

The Honourable James Elles
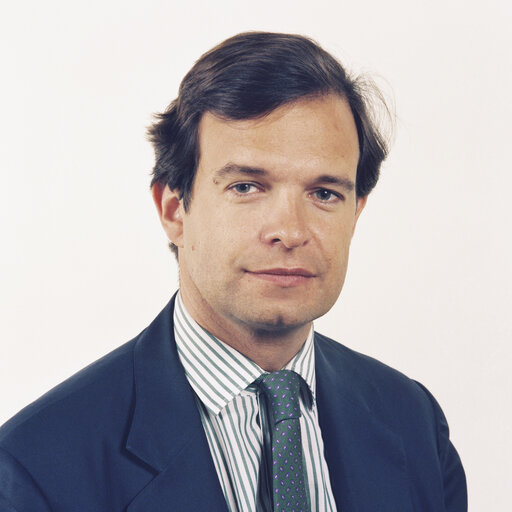

Member of the European Parliament for South East England Buckinghamshire and Oxfordshire East (1994-1999) Oxfordshire and Buckinghamshire (1984-1994)
- In office 14 June 1984 – 22 May 2014
- Preceded by: District created
- Succeeded by: Diane James

Personal details
- Born: James Edmund Moncrieff Elles; 3 September 1949 (age 76) London, England
- Party: Conservative
- Parent: Diana Elles (mother)

James Edmund Moncrieff Elles (born 3 September 1949 in London) is a former Conservative Party Member of the European Parliament (MEP) for South East England.

Elles is the son of Diana Newcombe Elles, Baroness Elles and her husband, Neil Patrick Moncrieff Elles. He served as the MEP for Oxfordshire and Buckinghamshire from 1984 to 1994, and following boundary changes for Buckinghamshire and Oxfordshire East from 1994 to 1999. He then represented South East England in the European Parliament from 1999 to 2014.

In 2019 he published the book Fiction, Fact and Future: The Essence of EU Democracy as an author under the Haus Curiosities series of The University of Chicago Press.

== Early career ==
He was educated at Eton College and the University of Edinburgh where he graduated with a BSc in agriculture. He became a European MP after an eight-year career as a civil servant with the European Commission, initially as a Tokyo Round negotiator and latterly as Assistant to the Deputy Director-General of Agriculture.

== Member of the European Parliament ==
Elles served six terms in the European Parliament, his principal Committee being the Budgets Committee for the entire 30-year period. He was overall rapporteur on the EU budget for the years 1996 and 2007. During this period, he was also a substitute member of the Foreign Affairs Committee and the Budget Control Committee. He founded the Thames Valley European Forum, now renamed the South East Conservative European Network (SECEN), of which he is currently chairman.

He did not contest the 2014 election and retired from the European Parliament.

== Transatlantic Policy Network (TPN) ==
In 1992 he founded the Transatlantic Policy Network (TPN). The purpose of TPN is to help build bridges between the EU and the US involving business and policymakers on both sides of the Atlantic, feeding in ideas, for example, to create the new transatlantic agenda (NTA) in 1995 and, more recently, putting forward suggestions to strengthen transatlantic partnership through the completion of the transatlantic market from 2008 onwards. This has led to the Transatlantic Trade and Investment Partnership (TTIP) under negotiation between the EU and the U.S. since February 2013. He is currently Chairman of the Management Committee of the Network.

== European Internet Foundation (EIF) ==
In 2000, Elles and two other parliamentarians, as co-founders, launched the European Internet Foundation (EIF). The purpose of the European Internet Foundation is to help encourage European political leadership in the development of active public policies that respond to the political, economic, and social challenges of the worldwide digital revolution. The EIF aims to ensure that the European Union remains open to developments in the digital economy and benefits fully from it through enhanced global competitiveness and social progress. Its most recent contribution to long-term thinking was contained in its document "The Digital World in 2030: what place for Europe?" in which it called for completing the Digital Single Market (March 2014). He remains a member of the EIF Steering Committee.

== European Ideas Network (EIN) ==
In August 2002, Elles founded the European Ideas Network (EIN), an open network think-tank on a European scale for the centre-right. He stepped down as Chairman of the Network in March 2008.

== European Strategy and Policy Analysis System (ESPAS) ==
Elles laid the foundation for creating the European Strategy and Policy Analysis System (ESPAS) by tabling two budget amendments in 2010 and 2012. Their purpose was to establish an inter-institutional system looking closely at long-term trends with a view to providing foresight, feeding in-principle ideas into strategic policy-making. It is governed by a Steering Group where all EU institutions are represented at Secretary-General or substitute level meetings on a regular basis where Elles is Honorary President.
