= Peter Skinner =

British Labour politician

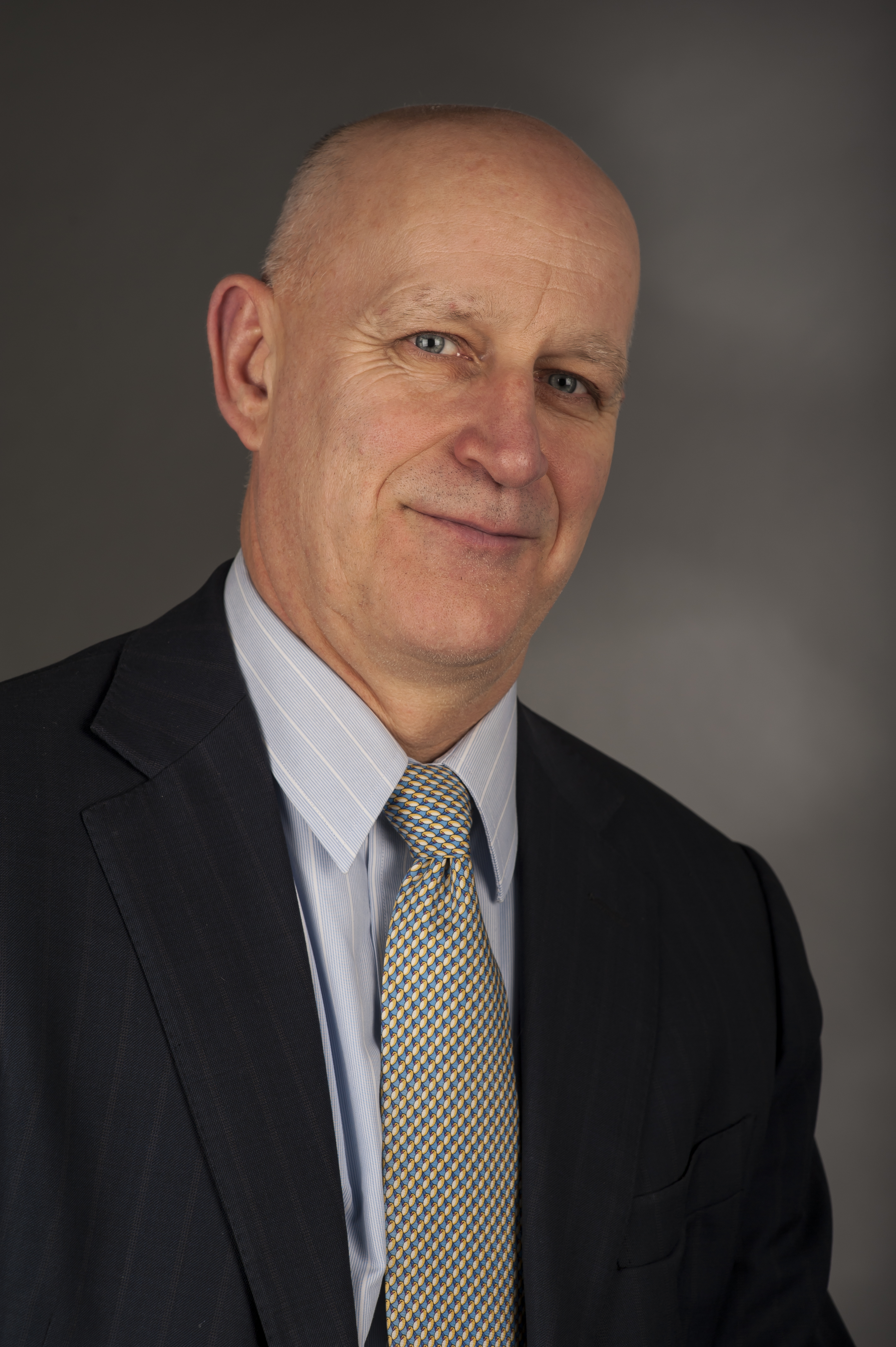
- Skinner in 2014

Member of the European Parliament for South East England
- In office 10 June 1999 – 2 July 2014
- Preceded by: Position established
- Succeeded by: Anneliese Dodds

Member of the European Parliament for Kent West
- In office 9 June 1994 – 10 June 1999
- Preceded by: Ben Patterson
- Succeeded by: Position abolished

Personal details
- Born: 1 June 1959 (age 67) Oxford, England
- Party: Labour
- Education: University of Bradford; University of Warwick; University of Greenwich
- Profession: Politician

Peter William Skinner (born 1 June 1959 in Oxford) is a British former Labour Party politician. He was a Member of the European Parliament (MEP) from 1994 until 2014, first for the Kent West constituency from 1994 to 1999, and then from 1999 for South East England, after the reforms in European Elections created multi-member constituencies based on British regions. On 31 March 2016, Skinner was found guilty of fraudulently claiming expenses whilst an MEP, and subsequently jailed for 4 years.

== Early life ==
Peter Skinner was born in Oxford on 1 June 1959. Educated at St. Josephs R.C. Secondary Modern School in Orpington, Kent, he attended Bradford University between 1979 and 1982 where he attained a BSc in Economics and Politics. Between 1986 and 1987 he undertook a post-graduate course in Industrial Relations at the university of Warwick, and in 1991 completed a post-graduate Diploma in Education at Coventry University. Skinner has also gained a professional qualification in Management from the University of Greenwich.

== Professional career ==
Skinner was a press consultant and latterly a lecturer in Economics and Business at North West Kent College of Technology and University of Greenwich before being elected to the European Parliament.

== Member of the European Parliament ==
In 1994, Skinner was elected to the European Parliament as the Member of the European Parliament (MEP) for Kent West, a political constituency within England. In 1999, he was elected again to the European Parliament, as an MEP for the South East of England Region. He was re-elected in 2004 and 2009, before standing down at the 2014 European Parliament election. He was succeeded by Anneliese Dodds.

== Expenses fraud and conviction ==
In 2015, Skinner was charged with: two counts of making a false instrument; one count of fraud; and one count of false accounting between 2004 and 2009. In his subsequent trial at Southwark Crown Court, the jury heard that he had claimed almost £100,000 for support staff over a five-year period. In evidence, it was alleged that Skinner had made payments of £10,000 a month to his wife from December 2007 until July 2009, which entitled him to claim secretarial or parliamentary assistance allowance. It is also alleged that he created a fake letter, for a payment of £5000 for work conducted by his father. In his defence, Skinner claimed he had been confused over the rules, and blamed a lack of information given to him by the European Parliament. On 31 March 2016, Skinner was found guilty of: one count of making a false instrument; one count of fraud; and one count of false accounting. Warned that he would face a prison sentence, on 29 April 2016 he was jailed for 4 years.
