= Phil Bennion =

British politician

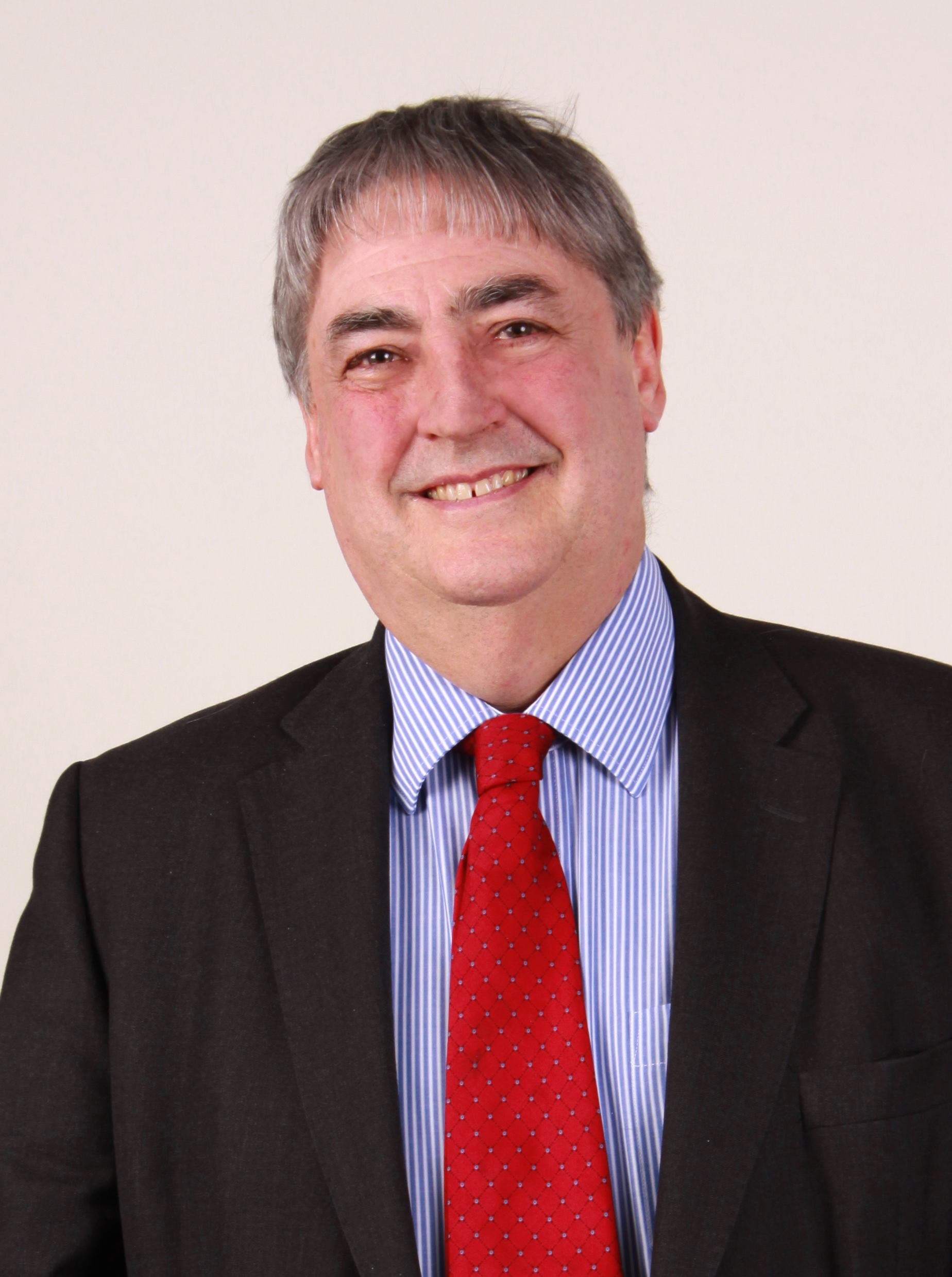
- Bennion in 2014

Member of the European Parliament for West Midlands
- In office 2 July 2019 – 31 January 2020
- Preceded by: James Carver
- Succeeded by: Constituency abolished
- In office 6 February 2012 – 2 July 2014
- Preceded by: Liz Lynne
- Succeeded by: James Carver

Personal details
- Born: 7 October 1954 (age 71) Tamworth, Staffordshire, England
- Party: Liberal Democrats
- Education: University of Aberdeen; Newcastle University; University of Birmingham
- Occupation: Farmer

Phillip Bennion (born 7 October 1954) is a British Liberal Democrat politician. He served as a Member of the European Parliament (MEP) for the West Midlands from 2012 to 2014, and then from 2019 to 2020.

== Early life and education ==
Bennion was born in Tamworth, Staffordshire and educated at Queen Elizabeth Grammar School. He went on to study agriculture and agronomy at Aberdeen and Newcastle. After returning to Staffordshire to run his family farm, he gained a second degree, in history and economic history, from the University of Birmingham.

== Political career ==
Bennion advised Charles Kennedy on agricultural issues during his leadership of the Liberal Democrats. Bennion went on to serve on the party's federal policy committee for eight years.

=== European parliament ===
He was second on the party list for the West Midlands constituency at the 2009 European Parliament election, but the party's 12% share of the vote entitled them to only one seat. When Liz Lynne stepped down in February 2012, electoral rules meant that Bennion, as the next Liberal Democrat candidate on the list, took her seat. He stood for re-election in 2014 and was placed top of his party's list of candidates, but he lost his seat as the Liberal Democrats polled 5.6% of the vote, too little to secure one of the West Midlands' seven seats. He re-gained his seat in 2019.

He sat on the Committee on Foreign Affairs and the Sub-Committee on Human Rights, and also acted as a substitute on the Committee on the Internal Market and Consumer Protection, as a member of the 9th Parliament from July 2019 to January 2020.

=== Electoral history ===
He served as a councillor on Lichfield District Council from 1999 to 2011 and on Staffordshire County Council from 2002–2005. He was again elected to Lichfield District Council in 2023.

Bennion stood as the Parliamentary candidate for Lichfield in 1997 and 2001, for Tamworth in 2005, Telford in 2010 and Birmingham Hodge Hill in 2015 and 2017.

General election 1997: Lichfield
Party	Candidate	Votes	%	±%
Conservative	Michael Fabricant	20,853	42.9	N/A
Labour	Susan Woodward	20,615	42.4	N/A
Liberal Democrats	Phil Bennion	5,473	11.3	N/A
Referendum	George Seward	1,652	3.4	N/A
Majority		238	0.5	N/A
Turnout		48,593	77.5	N/A
Conservative win (new seat)				

General election 2001: Lichfield
Party	Candidate	Votes	%	±%
Conservative	Michael Fabricant	20,480	49.1	▲6.2
Labour	Martin Machray	16,054	38.5	▼3.9
Liberal Democrats	Phil Bennion	4,462	10.7	▼0.6
UKIP	John Phazey	684	1.6	N/A
Majority		4,426	10.6	▲10.1
Turnout		41,680	65.9	▼11.5
Conservative hold		Swing	▲5.05	

General election 2005: Tamworth
Party	Candidate	Votes	%	±%
Labour	Brian Jenkins	18,801	43.0	▼6.0
Conservative	Christopher Pincher	16,232	37.1	▼0.5
Liberal Democrats	Phillip Bennion	6,175	14.1	▲2.4
Veritas	Patrick Eston	1,320	3.0	N/A
UKIP	Tom Simpson	1,212	2.8	▲1.1
Majority		2,569	5.9	▼6.5
Turnout		43,740	61.0	▲3.2
Labour hold		Swing	▼2.8	

General election 2010: Telford
Party	Candidate	Votes	%	±%
Labour	David Wright	15,977	38.7	▼9.5
Conservative	Tom Biggins	14,996	36.3	▲3.2
Liberal Democrats	Phillip Bennion	6,399	15.5	▲1.4
UKIP	Denis Allen	2,428	5.9	▲1.2
BNP	Phil Spencer	1,513	3.7	N/A
Majority		981	2.4	
Turnout		41,313	63.5	▲4.8
Labour hold		Swing	▼6.3	

General election 2015: Birmingham Hodge Hill
Party	Candidate	Votes	%	±%
Labour	Liam Byrne	28,069	68.4	▲16.4
Conservative	Kieran Mullan	4,707	11.5	▼0.2
UKIP	Albert Duffen	4,651	11.3	▲9.7
Liberal Democrats	Phil Bennion	2,624	6.4	▼21.3
Green	Chris Nash	835	2.0	Steady
Communist	Andy Chaffer	153	0.4	Steady
Majority		23,362	56.9	▲32.6
Turnout		41,039	54.5	▼1.1
Labour hold		Swing	▲8.3	

General election 2017: Birmingham, Hodge Hill
Party	Candidate	Votes	%	±%
Labour	Liam Byrne	37,606	81.1	▲12.7
Conservative	Ahmereen Reza	6,580	14.2	▲2.7
UKIP	Mohammed Khan	1,016	2.2	▼9.1
Liberal Democrats	Phil Bennion	805	1.7	▼4.7
Green	Clare Thomas	387	0.8	▼1.2
Majority		31,026	66.9	▲10.0
Turnout		46,394	61.3	▲6.8
Labour hold		Swing	▲5.0	

European Parliamentary Candidate for West Midlands (European Parliament constituency) in 1999, 2004 and 2009, being elected to No2 on the Liberal Democrats' regional list in 2009 taking his seat in 2012 after Liz Lynne stepped down. Phil was re-elected as no1 on the Liberal Democrats' regional list in 2019.

=== 2019 ===
Map showing highest polling party by counting area in the 2019 European Parliament election; Brexit Party Labour Liberal Democrats

2014 results

European Election 2019: West Midlands
List	Candidates	Votes	Of total (%)	± from prev.
Brexit Party	Rupert Lowe (1) Martin Daubney (2) Andrew England Kerr (5) Vishal Khatri, Nikki Page, Laura Kevehazi, Katharine Harborne	507,152 (169,050.67)	37.66	+37.66
Labour	Neena Gill (3) Sion Simon, Julia Buckley, Ansar Khan, Zarah Sultana, Sam Hennessy, Liz Clements	228,298	16.95	−9.76
Liberal Democrats	Phil Bennion (4) Ade Adeyemo, Jeanie Falconer, Jenny Wilkinson, Jennifer Gray, Beverley Nielsen, Lee Dargue	219,982	16.33	+10.77
Green	Ellie Chowns (6) Diana Toynbee, Paul Woodhead, Julian Dean, Louis Stephen, Helen Heathfield, Kefentse Dennis	143,520	10.66	+5.40
Conservative	Anthea McIntyre (7) Daniel Dalton, Suzanne Webb, Meirion Jenkins, Alex Philips, Mary Noone, Ahmed Ejaz	135,279	10.04	−14.27
UKIP	Ernest Valentine, Paul Williams, Graham Eardley, Paul Allen, Nigel Ely, Joe Smyth, Derek Bennett	66,934	4.97	−26.52
Change UK	Stephen Dorrell, Charlotte Gath, Peter Wilding, Amrik Kandola, Joanna McKenna, Victor Odusanya, Lucinda Empson	45,673	3.39	+3.39
Turnout		1,355,222	33.1%	Steady

European Election 2014: West Midlands
List	Candidates	Votes	Of total (%)	± from prev.
UKIP	Jill Seymour, James Carver, Bill Etheridge Phil Henrick, Michael Wrench, Michael Green, Lyndon Jones	428,010 (142,670)	31.5	+10.2
Labour	Neena Gill, Siôn Simon Lynda Waltho, Ansar Ali Khan, Olwen Hamer, Tony Ethapemi, Philippa Louise Roberts	363,033 (181,517)	26.7	+9.7
Conservative	Philip Bradbourn, Anthea McIntyre, Daniel Dalton, Michael Burnett, Sibby Buckle, Daniel Sames, Alex Avern	330,470 (165,235)	24.3	−3.8
Liberal Democrats	Phil Bennion, Jonathan Webber, Christine Tinker, Ayoub Khan, Tim Bearder, Neville Farmer, John Redfern	75,648	5.6	−6.4
Green	Will Duckworth, Aldo Mussi, Vicky Duckworth, Tom Harris, Karl Macnaughton, Duncan Kerr, Laura Katherine Vesty	71,464	5.3	−0.9
An Independence from Europe	Mike Nattrass, Mark Nattrass, Joshna Pattni, Carl Henry Humphries, George Viner Forrest, Douglas Stephen Ingram, Paul Alders	27,171	2.0	N/A
We Demand a Referendum	Nikki Sinclaire, Andy Adris, Linda Brown, David Bennett, Judith Smart, Thomas Reid, Amanda Wilson	23,426	1.7	N/A
BNP	Michael Coleman, Jennifer Matthys, Kenneth Griffiths, Simon Patten, David Bradnock, Mark Badrick, Phil Kimberley	20,643	1.5	−7.1
English Democrat	Derek Hilling, Chris Newey, Stephen Paxton, Charles Hayward, Margaret Stoll, David Lane, Fred Bishop	12,832	0.9	−1.4
NO2EU	Dave Nellist, Pat Collins, Joanne Stevenson, Sophia Hussain, Paul Edward Reilly, Andrew Mark Chaffer, Amanda Jane Marfleet	4,653	0.3	−0.7
Harmony Party	Reg Mahrra	1,857	0.1	N/A
Turnout		1,359,210	33.1	−1.7

Anthea McIntyre became an MEP in November 2011 when the relevant provisions of the Treaty of Lisbon came into effect, her addition being based on the 2009 vote. Phil Bennion became an MEP on the resignation of Liz Lynne.

European Election 2009: West Midlands
List	Candidates	Votes	Of total (%)	± from prev.
Conservative	Philip Bradbourn, Malcolm Harbour Anthea McIntyre, Michael Burnett, Mark Spelman, Daniel Dalton	396,847 (198,423.5)	28.1	+0.7
UKIP	Mike Nattrass, Nikki Sinclaire Jill Seymour, Rustie Lee, Malcolm Hurst, Jonathan Oakton	300,471 (150,235.5)	21.3	+3.8
Labour	Michael Cashman Neena Gill, Claire Edwards, Anthony Painter, Victoria Quinn, Mohammed Nazir	240,201	17.0	−6.4
Liberal Democrats	Liz Lynne Phil Bennion, Susan Juned, Colin Ross, Stephen Barber, William Powell	170,246	12.0	−1.7
BNP	Simon Darby, Alby Walker, Chris Turner, Ken Griffiths, Ellie Walker	121,967	8.6	+1.1
Green	Felicity Norman, Peter Tinsley, Chris Williams, Ian Davison, Vicky Dunn, Dave Wall	88,244	6.2	+1.1
English Democrat	David Lane, Frederick Bishop, John Lane, Graham Walker, Michael Ellis, Kim Gandy	32,455	2.3	N/A
Christian	David Booth, Samuel Nelson, Abiodun Akiwumi, Yeside Oguntoye, Ade Raji, Maxine Hargreaves	18,784	1.3	N/A
Socialist Labour	John Tyrrell, Satbir Singh Johal, Rajinder Claire, Bhagwant Singh, Surinder Pal Virdee, Shangra Singh Bhatoe	14,724	1.0	+0.4
NO2EU	David Nellist, Dyal Singh Bagri, Malcolm Gribbin, Jo Stevenson, Peter MacLaren, Andy Chaffer	13,415	1.0	N/A
Jury Team	Geoffery Coady, Graham Burton, Jeremy Spencer, David Bennett, Colin Thompson	8,721	0.6	N/A
Libertas	Jimmy Millard, Bridget Rose, Zigi Davenport, Andrew Bebbington, David Black, Matthew Lingard	6,961	0.5	N/A
Turnout		1,413,036	34.8	−1.2

European Election 2004: West Midlands
List	Candidates	Votes	Of total (%)	± from prev.
Conservative	Philip Bushill-Matthews, Philip Bradbourn, Malcolm Harbour Andrew Griffiths, Peter Butler, Michael John Burnett, Jeremy Lefroy	392,937 (130,979)	27.3	−10.6
Labour	Michael Cashman, Neena Gill Sue Hayman, Anthony Paul Carroll, Claire Edwards, Mohammad Nazir, Jane Louise Heggie	336,613 (168,306.5)	23.4	−4.6
UKIP	Michael Nattrass Earl of Bradford, Denis Vernon Brookes, Richard John Chamings, Christopher Rupert Kingsley, Greville James Guy Warwick, Andrew Moore	251,366	17.5	+11.8
Liberal Democrats	Liz Lynne Paul Calvin Tilsley, Phillip Bennion, Martin Marshall Turner, Nicola Sian Davies, Lorely Burt, Michael David Dixon	197,479	13.7	+2.4
BNP	Simon Darby, Simon Charles Smith, Martin David Roberts, Robert Purcell, Mark Andrew Payne, Michael Coleman, William Thomas Locke	107,794	7.5	+5.8
Green	Chris Lennard, Felicity Mary Norman, David Wall, Barney Smith, Thomas Christopher Hellberg, Damon Leroy Hoppe, Rebecca Roseff	73,991	5.1	−0.6
Respect	John Rees, Salma Yaqoob, Cheryl Jacqueline Naomi Garvey, Mohammad Naseem, Winifred Olive Mary Whitehouse, Anil Seera, Penelope Hicks	34,704	2.4	N/A
Pensioners	Barry Hodgson	33,501	2.3	N/A
Common Good	Dick Rodgers	8,650	0.6	N/A
Turnout		1,437,035	36.0	+15.0

European Election 1999: West Midlands
List	Candidates	Votes	Of total (%)	± from prev.
Conservative	John Corrie, Philip Bushill-Matthews, Malcolm Harbour, Philip Bradbourn Richard Normington, Virginia Taylor, Mark Greenburgh, Michael Burnett	321,719 (80,429.75)	37.9	N/A
Labour	Simon Murphy, Michael Cashman, Neena Gill Mike Tappin, David Hallam, Phil Davis, Nuala O'Kane, Brenda Etchells	237,671 (79,223.67)	28.0	N/A
Liberal Democrats	Liz Lynne Paul Tilsley, Susan Juned, Phillip Bennion, Joan Walmsley, Sardul Marwa, Jamie Calder, John Cordwell	95,769	11.3	N/A
UKIP	Mike Nattrass, Paul Garratt, Jonathan Oakton, Richard Charnings, Douglas Hope, Ian Crompton, Richard Adams, Clive Easton	49,621	5.8	N/A
Green	Felicity Norman, Guy Woodford, Paul Baptie, Hazel Clawley, Richard Mountford, Alan Clawley, Andrew Holtham, Elly Stanton	49,440	5.8	N/A
Independent Labour	Christine Oddy	36,849	4.3	N/A
Liberal	Michael Hyde, Robert Wheway, Colin Hallmark, Ann Winfield, Nicholas Brown, Anthony Bourko, David Hallmark, Joyce Millington	14,954	1.8	N/A
BNP	Sharron Edwards, Simon Darby, Stephen Edwards, Jeffrey Astbury, Keith Axon, Steven Batkin, Tommy Rogers, John Haycock	14,344	1.7	N/A
Pro-Euro Conservative	Brendan Donnelly, Rob Coppinger, Tim Perkins, Diane Hazeldine, Andrew Notman, John Gretton, Steve Law, John Marshall	11,144	1.3	N/A
Socialist Alliance	Dave Nellist, John Rothery, Lanne Hubbard, Salman Mirzo, Natasha Millward, Robert Hope, James Cessford, Peter McNally	7,203	0.8	N/A
Socialist Labour	Sonan Singh, Satbir Singh Johal, Judith Sambrook-Marshall, Surinder Pal Virdee, David Ayrton, Brenda Procter, Carlos Rule, Michael Atherton	5,257	0.6	N/A
EDP English Freedom Party	Michael Gibbs	3,066	0.4	N/A
Natural Law	Paul Davis, James Drewster, Huw Meads, Roger Gerrett, Mary Griffin, Roderic McCarthy, Brian Winstanley, Michael Twite	1,647	0.2	N/A
Turnout		848,684	21.0	N/A
