= Independence from Europe election results =

Independence from Europe was a minor political party in Great Britain.

== 2014 European Parliament election ==
With 1.5% of the national vote, An Independence from Europe finished in seventh place. It was the highest placed party to not win a seat.

Constituency	No. of candidates	No. of votes	% of vote
East Midlands	5	21,384	1.9
East of England	7	26,564	1.7
London	8	26,675	1.2
North East England	3	13,934	2.3
North West England	8	26,731	1.5
South East England	10	45,199	1.9
South West England	6	23,169	1.6
West Midlands	7	27,171	2.0
Yorkshire and the Humber	6	24,297	1.9
Total	60	235,124	1.5

== 2015 general election ==
All candidates lost their deposits.

Constituency	Candidate	No. of votes	% of vote
Boston & Skegness	Chris Pain	324	0.7
Brigg & Goole	Ray Spalding	28	0.1
Cheadle	Helen Bashford	76	0.1
Meriden	Chris Booth	100	0.2
Solihull	Mike Nattrass	50	0.1
Total	5	678	0.2

== See also ==
- UK Independence Party election results
