= Staffordshire West and Congleton (European Parliament constituency) =

Former European Parliament constituency

- European Parliament constituency
- Boundary within the West Midlands (1994-1999)
- Member state: United Kingdom
- Created: 1994
- Dissolved: 1999
- MEPs: 1

Prior to its uniform adoption of proportional representation in 1999, the United Kingdom used first-past-the-post for the European elections in England, Scotland and Wales. The European Parliament constituencies used under that system were smaller than the later regional constituencies and only had one Member of the European Parliament each.

The constituency of Staffordshire West and Congleton was one of them.

It consisted of the Westminster Parliament constituencies (on their 1983 boundaries) of Congleton, Newcastle-under-Lyme, South Staffordshire, Stafford, Stoke-on-Trent Central, Stoke-on-Trent North, and Stoke-on-Trent South.

Michael Tappin of the Labour Party was this constituency's only MEP.

== MEPs ==
Elected	Member	Party
1994	Michael Tappin	Labour
1999	Constituency abolished: see West Midlands	

== Election results ==
European Parliament election, 1994: Staffordshire West and Congleton
Party	Candidate	Votes	%	±%
Labour	Michael Tappin	84,337	53.1	
Conservative	Anthony G. Brown	44,060	27.7	
Liberal Democrats	H. J. (John) Stevens	24,430	15.4	
Green	Damon L. Hoppe	4,553	2.9	
Natural Law	P. D. M. (David) Lines	1,403	0.9	
Majority		40,277	25.4	
Turnout		158,783	31.6	
Labour win (new seat)				
