= West Midlands (European Parliament constituency) =

Former European Parliament constituency

- European Parliament constituency
- Location among the 2014 constituencies

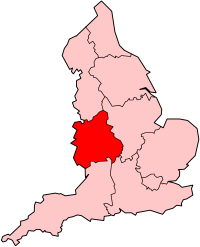
- Shown within England
- Member state: United Kingdom
- Created: 1999
- Dissolved: 31 January 2020
- MEPs: 8 (1999–2004); 7 (2004–2009); 6 (2009–2011); 7 (2011–2020)

West Midlands was a constituency of the European Parliament. It was represented by seven MEPs using the D'Hondt method of party-list proportional representation. In 2009, the constituency was reduced to six seats, but also elected a "virtual MEP" who took her seat in the Parliament when the Treaty of Lisbon came into effect. The constituency was represented by seven MEPs prior to the 2009 election, until the UK exit from the European Union on 31 January 2020.

== Boundaries ==
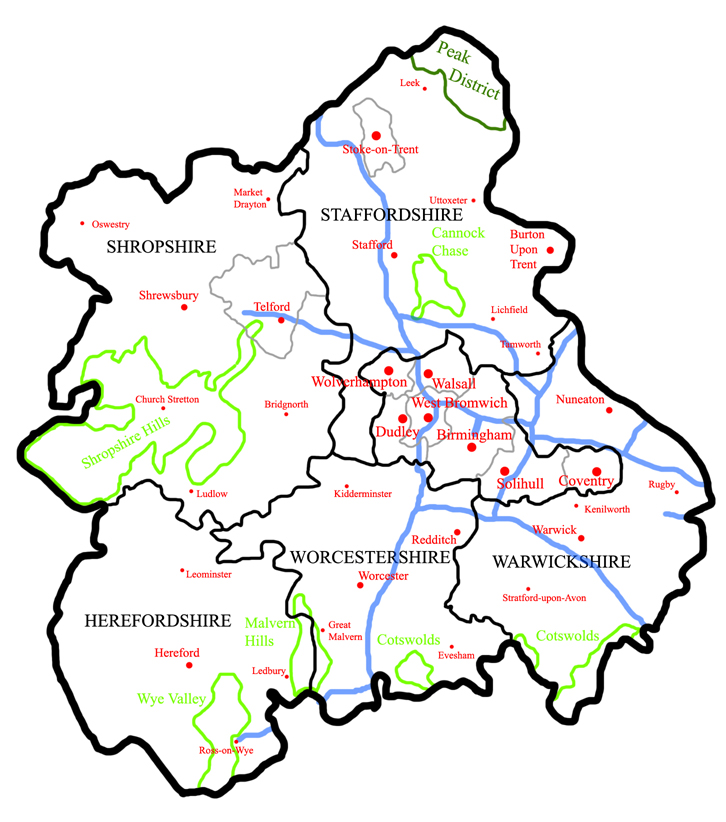
A map of the West Midlands region, showing Towns/Cities in Red, Motorways in Blue, AONBs in Light Green and National Parks in Dark Green.

The constituency corresponded to the West Midlands region of England, comprising the ceremonial counties of Herefordshire, Shropshire, Staffordshire, Warwickshire, West Midlands and Worcestershire.

== History ==
It was formed as a result of the European Parliamentary Elections Act 1999, replacing a number of single-member constituencies. These were Birmingham East, Birmingham West, Coventry and North Warwickshire, Herefordshire and Shropshire, Midlands West, Worcestershire and South Warwickshire, and parts of Peak District, Staffordshire East and Derby, and Staffordshire West and Congleton.

== Returned members ==
MEPs for the West Midlands, 1999 onwards
Election	1999 (5th parliament)	2004 (6th parliament)	2009 (7th parliament)		2014 (8th parliament)	2019 (9th parliament)
MEP Party	Philip Bushill-Matthews; Conservative		Seat Abolished	Anthea McIntyre; Conservative		
MEP Party	Philip Bradbourn; Conservative				Daniel Dalton; Conservative	Rupert Lowe; Brexit Party
MEP Party	Malcolm Harbour; Conservative				Bill Etheridge; UKIP (2014-2018); Independent (2018); Libertarian (2018-2019); Brexit Party (2019)	Andrew Kerr; Brexit Party (2019); Independent (2019-)
MEP Party	John Corrie; Conservative	Mike Nattrass; UKIP (2004–2013); Independent (2013–2014); An Independence from Europe (2014)			Jill Seymour; UKIP (2014-2019); Brexit Party (2019)	Martin Daubney; Brexit Party
MEP Party	Liz Lynne; Liberal Democrat			Phil Bennion; Liberal Democrat	James Carver; UKIP (2014-2018); Independent (2018-19)	Phil Bennion; Liberal Democrat
MEP Party	Neena Gill; Labour		Nikki Sinclaire; UKIP (2009–10); Independent (2010–12); We Demand a Referendum (2012–2014)		Neena Gill; Labour	
MEP Party	Michael Cashman; Labour				Siôn Simon; Labour	Ellie Chowns; Green
MEP Party	Simon Murphy; Labour	Seat abolished				

== Election results ==
Elected candidates are shown in bold. Brackets indicate the number of votes per seat won and the order in which MEPs were elected.

=== 2019 ===
Map showing highest polling party by counting area in the 2019 European Parliament election; Brexit Party Labour Liberal Democrats

European Election 2019: West Midlands
List	Candidates	Votes	Of total (%)	± from prev.
Brexit Party	**Rupert Lowe** (1) **Martin Daubney** (2) **Andrew England Kerr** (5) Vishal Khatri, Nikki Page, Laura Kevehazi, Katharine Harborne	507,152 (169,050.67)	37.66	+37.66
Labour	**Neena Gill** (3) Siôn Simon, Julia Buckley, Ansar Khan, Zarah Sultana, Sam Hennessy, Liz Clements	228,298	16.95	−9.76
Liberal Democrats	**Phil Bennion** (4) Ade Adeyemo, Jeanie Falconer, Jenny Wilkinson, Jennifer Gray, Beverley Nielsen, Lee Dargue	219,982	16.33	+10.77
Green	**Ellie Chowns** (6) Diana Toynbee, Paul Woodhead, Julian Dean, Louis Stephen, Helen Heathfield, Kefentse Dennis	143,520	10.66	+5.40
Conservative	**Anthea McIntyre** (7) Daniel Dalton, Suzanne Webb, Meirion Jenkins, Alex Philips, Mary Noone, Ahmed Ejaz	135,279	10.04	−14.27
UKIP	Ernest Valentine, Paul Williams, Graham Eardley, Paul Allen, Nigel Ely, Joe Smyth, Derek Bennett	66,934	4.97	−26.52
Change UK	Stephen Dorrell, Charlotte Gath, Peter Wilding, Amrik Kandola, Joanna McKenna, Victor Odusanya, Lucinda Empson	45,673	3.39	+3.39
Turnout		1,355,222	33.1	Steady

=== 2014 ===
2014 results

European Election 2014: West Midlands
List	Candidates	Votes	Of total (%)	± from prev.
UKIP	**Jill Seymour** (1) **James Carver** (4) **Bill Etheridge** (7) Phil Henrick, Michael Wrench, Michael Green, Lyndon Jones	428,010 (142,670)	31.5	+10.2
Labour	**Neena Gill** (2) **Siôn Simon** (5) Lynda Waltho, Ansar Ali Khan, Olwen Hamer, Tony Ethapemi, Philippa Louise Roberts	363,033 (181,517)	26.7	+9.7
Conservative	**Philip Bradbourn** (3) **Anthea McIntyre** (6) Daniel Dalton, Michael Burnett, Sibby Buckle, Daniel Sames, Alex Avern	330,470 (165,235)	24.3	−3.8
Liberal Democrats	Phil Bennion, Jonathan Webber, Christine Tinker, Ayoub Khan, Tim Bearder, Neville Farmer, John Redfern	75,648	5.6	−6.4
Green	Will Duckworth, Aldo Mussi, Vicky Duckworth, Tom Harris, Karl Macnaughton, Duncan Kerr, Laura Katherine Vesty	71,464	5.3	−0.9
An Independence from Europe	Mike Nattrass, Mark Nattrass, Joshna Pattni, Carl Henry Humphries, George Viner Forrest, Douglas Stephen Ingram, Paul Alders	27,171	2.0	New
We Demand a Referendum	Nikki Sinclaire, Andy Adris, Linda Brown, David Bennett, Judith Smart, Thomas Reid, Amanda Wilson	23,426	1.7	New
BNP	Michael Coleman, Jennifer Matthys, Kenneth Griffiths, Simon Patten, David Bradnock, Mark Badrick, Phil Kimberley	20,643	1.5	−7.1
English Democrat	Derek Hilling, Chris Newey, Stephen Paxton, Charles Hayward, Margaret Stoll, David Lane, Fred Bishop	12,832	0.9	−1.4
NO2EU	Dave Nellist, Pat Collins, Joanne Stevenson, Sophia Hussain, Paul Edward Reilly, Andrew Mark Chaffer, Amanda Jane Marfleet	4,653	0.3	−0.7
Harmony Party	Reg Mahrra	1,857	0.1	New
Turnout		1,359,210	33.1	−1.7

Anthea McIntyre became an MEP in November 2011 when the relevant provisions of the Treaty of Lisbon came into effect, her addition being based on the 2009 vote. Phil Bennion became an MEP on the resignation of Liz Lynne.

=== 2009 ===
2009 results

European Election 2009: West Midlands
List	Candidates	Votes	Of total (%)	± from prev.
Conservative	**Philip Bradbourn** (1) **Malcolm Harbour** (4) Anthea McIntyre, Michael Burnett, Mark Spelman, Daniel Dalton	396,847 (198,423.5)	28.1	+0.8
UKIP	**Mike Nattrass** (2) **Nikki Sinclaire** (6) Jill Seymour, Rustie Lee, Malcolm Hurst, Jonathan Oakton	300,471 (150,235.5)	21.3	+3.8
Labour	**Michael Cashman** (3) Neena Gill, Claire Edwards, Anthony Painter, Victoria Quinn, Mohammed Nazir	240,201	17.0	−6.4
Liberal Democrats	**Liz Lynne** (5) Phil Bennion, Susan Juned, Colin Ross, Stephen Barber, William Powell	170,246	12.0	−1.7
BNP	Simon Darby, Alby Walker, Chris Turner, Ken Griffiths, Ellie Walker	121,967	8.6	+1.1
Green	Felicity Norman, Peter Tinsley, Chris Williams, Ian Davison, Vicky Dunn, Dave Wall	88,244	6.2	+1.1
English Democrat	David Lane, Frederick Bishop, John Lane, Graham Walker, Michael Ellis, Kim Gandy	32,455	2.3	New
Christian	David Booth, Samuel Nelson, Abiodun Akiwumi, Yeside Oguntoye, Ade Raji, Maxine Hargreaves	18,784	1.3	New
Socialist Labour	John Tyrrell, Satbir Singh Johal, Rajinder Claire, Bhagwant Singh, Surinder Pal Virdee, Shangra Singh Bhatoe	14,724	1.0	+0.4
NO2EU	David Nellist, Dyal Singh Bagri, Malcolm Gribbin, Jo Stevenson, Peter MacLaren, Andy Chaffer	13,415	1.0	New
Jury Team	Geoffery Coady, Graham Burton, Jeremy Spencer, David Bennett, Colin Thompson	8,721	0.6	New
Libertas	Jimmy Millard, Bridget Rose, Zigi Davenport, Andrew Bebbington, David Black, Matthew Lingard	6,961	0.5	New
Turnout		1,413,036	34.8	−1.2

=== 2004 ===
2004 results

European Election 2004: West Midlands
List	Candidates	Votes	Of total (%)	± from prev.
Conservative	**Philip Bushill-Matthews** (1) **Philip Bradbourn** (5) **Malcolm Harbour** (7) Andrew Griffiths, Peter Butler, Michael John Burnett, Jeremy Lefroy	392,937 (130,979)	27.3	−10.6
Labour	**Michael Cashman** (2) **Neena Gill** (6) Sue Hayman, Anthony Paul Carroll, Claire Edwards, Mohammad Nazir, Jane Louise Heggie	336,613 (168,306.5)	23.4	−4.6
UKIP	**Michael Nattrass** (3) Earl of Bradford, Denis Vernon Brookes, Richard John Chamings, Christopher Rupert Kingsley, Greville James Guy Warwick, Andrew Moore	251,366	17.5	+11.7
Liberal Democrats	**Liz Lynne** (4) Paul Calvin Tilsley, Phillip Bennion, Martin Marshall Turner, Nicola Sian Davies, Lorely Burt, Michael David Dixon	197,479	13.7	+2.4
BNP	Simon Darby, Simon Charles Smith, Martin David Roberts, Robert Purcell, Mark Andrew Payne, Michael Coleman, William Thomas Locke	107,794	7.5	+5.8
Green	Chris Lennard, Felicity Mary Norman, David Wall, Barney Smith, Thomas Christopher Hellberg, Damon Leroy Hoppe, Rebecca Roseff	73,991	5.1	−0.7
Respect	John Rees, Salma Yaqoob, Cheryl Jacqueline Naomi Garvey, Mohammad Naseem, Winifred Olive Mary Whitehouse, Anil Seera, Penelope Hicks	34,704	2.4	New
Pensioners	Barry Hodgson	33,501	2.3	New
Common Good	Dick Rodgers	8,650	0.6	New
Turnout		1,437,035	36.0	+15.0

=== 1999 ===
1999 results

European Election 1999: West Midlands
List	Candidates	Votes	Of total (%)	± from prev.
Conservative	**John Corrie** (1) **Philip Bushill-Matthews** (3) **Malcolm Harbour** (5) **Philip Bradbourn** (7) Richard Normington, Virginia Taylor, Mark Greenburgh, Michael Burnett	321,719 (80,429.75)	37.9	
Labour	**Simon Murphy** (2) **Michael Cashman** (4) **Neena Gill** (8) Mike Tappin, David Hallam, Phil Davis, Nuala O'Kane, Brenda Etchells	237,671 (79,223.67)	28.0	
Liberal Democrats	**Liz Lynne** (6) Paul Tilsley, Susan Juned, Phillip Bennion, Joan Walmsley, Sardul Marwa, Jamie Calder, John Cordwell	95,769	11.3	
UKIP	Mike Nattrass, Paul Garratt, Jonathan Oakton, Richard Charnings, Douglas Hope, Ian Crompton, Richard Adams, Clive Easton	49,621	5.8	
Green	Felicity Norman, Guy Woodford, Paul Baptie, Hazel Clawley, Richard Mountford, Alan Clawley, Andrew Holtham, Elly Stanton	49,440	5.8	
Independent Labour	Christine Oddy	36,849	4.3	
Liberal	Michael Hyde, Robert Wheway, Colin Hallmark, Ann Winfield, Nicholas Brown, Anthony Bourko, David Hallmark, Joyce Millington	14,954	1.8	
BNP	Sharron Edwards, Simon Darby, Stephen Edwards, Jeffrey Astbury, Keith Axon, Steven Batkin, Tommy Rogers, John Haycock	14,344	1.7	
Pro-Euro Conservative	Brendan Donnelly, Rob Coppinger, Tim Perkins, Diane Hazeldine, Andrew Notman, John Gretton, Steve Law, John Marshall	11,144	1.3	
Socialist Alliance	Dave Nellist, John Rothery, Lanne Hubbard, Salman Mirzo, Natasha Millward, Robert Hope, James Cessford, Peter McNally	7,203	0.8	
Socialist Labour	Sonan Singh, Satbir Singh Johal, Judith Sambrook-Marshall, Surinder Pal Virdee, David Ayrton, Brenda Procter, Carlos Rule, Michael Atherton	5,257	0.6	
EDP English Freedom Party	Michael Gibbs	3,066	0.4	
Natural Law	Paul Davis, James Drewster, Huw Meads, Roger Gerrett, Mary Griffin, Roderic McCarthy, Brian Winstanley, Michael Twite	1,647	0.2	
Turnout		848,684	21.0	

== Bibliography ==
- MEPs by region: West Midlands constituency
