= Daniel Dalton (British politician) =

British politician and cricketer

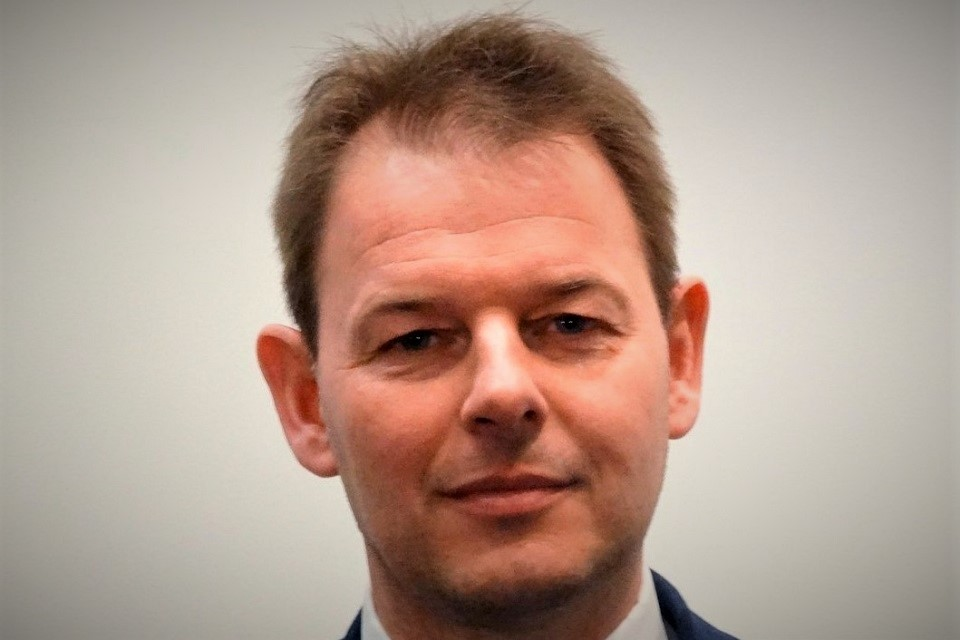

Member of the European Parliament for West Midlands
- In office 8 January 2015 – 1 July 2019
- Preceded by: Philip Bradbourn
- Succeeded by: Rupert Lowe

Personal details
- Born: 31 January 1974 (age 52) Oxford, Oxfordshire, England
- Party: Conservative
- Education: Warwick University; Coventry University
- Cricket career

Personal information
- Height: 5 ft 9 in (1.75 m)
- Batting: Right-handed
- Bowling: Left-arm medium

Domestic team information
- Years: Team
- 1999–2002: Warwickshire Cricket Board

Career statistics
Competition	LA
Matches	8
Runs scored	126
Batting average	15.75
100s/50s	–/–
Top score	46
Balls bowled	306
Wickets	10
Bowling average	21.00
5 wickets in innings	–
10 wickets in match	–
Best bowling	3/16
Catches/stumpings	1/–
- Source: Cricinfo, 26 October 2010

Daniel Anthony Thomas Dalton (born 31 January 1974) is a former cricketer and a Conservative Party politician in the United Kingdom who was a Member of the European Parliament (MEP) from 2014 to 2019.

== Cricket career ==
Born in Oxford, Daniel Dalton played county second eleven cricket for Kent, Gloucestershire and Warwickshire between 1996 and 2005 and Minor Counties cricket with Warwickshire cricket board

Dalton represented the Warwickshire Cricket Board in List A cricket. His debut List A match came against Berkshire in the 1999 NatWest Trophy. From 1999 to 2002, he represented the Board in 8 matches, the last of which came against Herefordshire in the 1st round of the 2003 Cheltenham & Gloucester Trophy, which was held in 2002. In his 8 List A matches, he scored 126 runs at a batting average of 15.75, with a high score of 46. In the field he took a single catch. With the ball he took 10 wickets at a bowling average of 21.00, with best figures of 3/16. Dalton was a right-handed batsman who bowled left-arm medium pace.

== Education ==
Dalton attended two schools in the West Midlands, the first being Arnold Lodge School in Leamington Spa followed by Warwick School. He also attended both Coventry and Warwick Universities.

== Political career ==
Dalton was chosen by the Conservative Party to stand as a candidate in the West Midlands for the 2014 European Parliament election in the United Kingdom. Dalton was placed at number three on the list, after Philip Bradbourn MEP and Anthea McIntyre MEP and was not elected. However he became the MEP for the West Midlands after Bradbourn died suddenly on 19 December 2014. He took his seat in the parliament on 8 January 2015. He had previously worked in the European Parliament for his party's Group. This is unusual: the only other British MEPs to have done so were Caroline Jackson and Anne McIntosh (Conservative) and Richard Corbett (Labour).

== Career after leaving the European Parliament ==
In April 2020, Dalton took over as the new CEO of the British Chamber of Commerce to the EU and Belgium, a group that represents more than 160 companies with business interests in the United Kingdom. Commenting on his appointment at the time, Tom Parker, President of the British Chamber of Commerce said "We are absolutely delighted to have Daniel join us. At this critical time for Europe and the UK, and with inevitably deeper UK-Belgium bilateral relations, Daniel's expertise and experience will ensure that the Chamber plays a central role in navigating a future where we remain close and strong partners."

== Personal life ==
Dalton is the grandson of gynaecologist Dr. Katharina Dalton who researched and pioneered many transformational treatments for women.
