= Jill Seymour =

British Independent politician (born 1958)

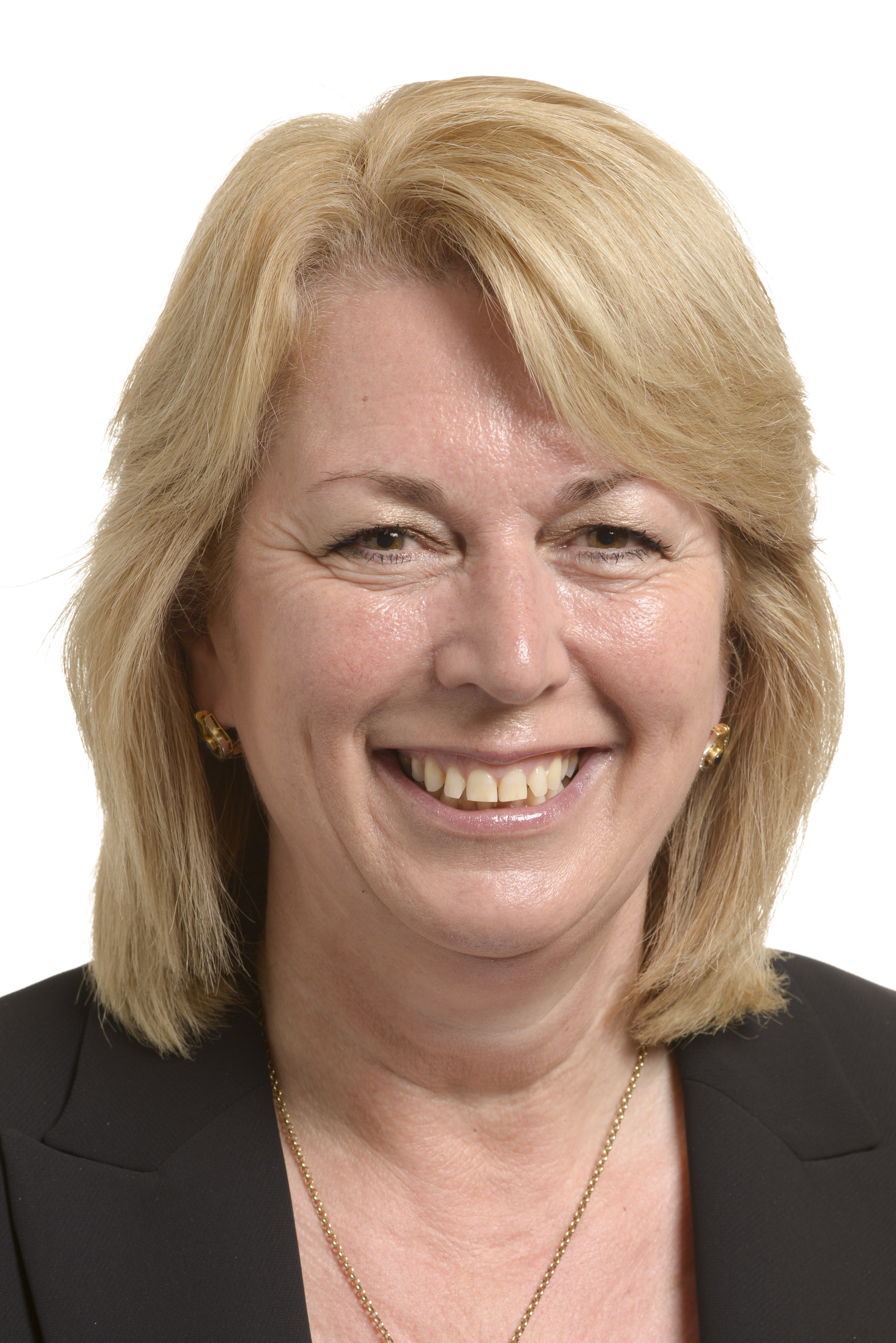

Member of the European Parliament for West Midlands
- In office 1 July 2014 – 1 July 2019
- Preceded by: Mike Nattrass
- Succeeded by: Martin Daubney

UKIP portfolios
- 2014–2018: Transport

Personal details
- Born: 8 May 1958 (age 68) Cosford, Shropshire, England
- Party: UK Independence Party (2002–2019); Brexit Party (April 2019–May 2019)

Jill Seymour (born 8 May 1958) is a British politician who served as a Member of the European Parliament (MEP) for the West Midlands from 2014 to 2019. Elected for the UK Independence Party (UKIP) in 2014, in April 2019 she defected to the Brexit Party. Despite her defection, she was not selected as a Brexit Party candidate for the 2019 European Parliament elections, and ceased to remain an MEP on 26 May 2019.

== Political career ==
In 2015 she was criticized for renting an office in Shropshire from her husband with taxpayers' money. The Independent reported that there was no suggestion that the arrangement was against European Parliament rules. She stood unsuccessfully for the UK Parliament in 2015, coming third at The Wrekin, but she did not stand in the 2017 election.

=== Transport spokesperson ===
After becoming an MEP, Seymour was appointed UKIP's transport spokesperson, serving until 2018 when she expressed unease about the direction the party was taking. As transport spokesperson Seymour was pro-car and anti-High Speed 2. In 2015, she became patron of the Alliance of British Drivers.
