= Andrew England Kerr =

British politician (born 1958)

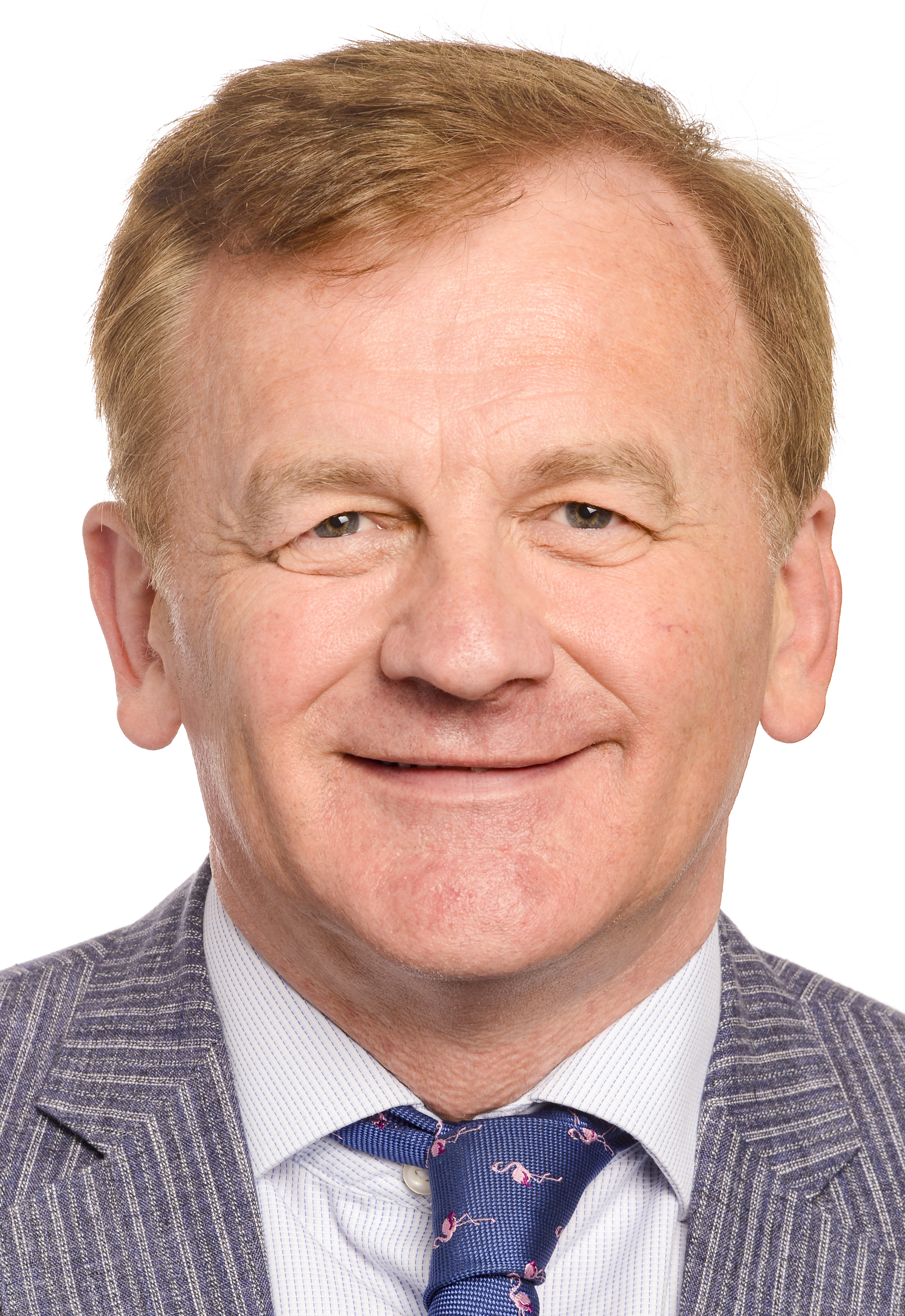

Member of the European Parliament for West Midlands
- In office 2 July 2019 – 31 January 2020
- Preceded by: Bill Etheridge
- Succeeded by: Constituency abolished

Personal details
- Born: Andrew Robert England Kerr; 23 September 1958 (age 67) Birmingham, Warwickshire, England
- Party: Independent (since 2019)
- Other political affiliations: Brexit (2019)
- Spouse: Sally Annaliese England Kerr
- Occupation: Politician and solicitor

Andrew Robert England Kerr (born 23 September 1958) is a British politician. England Kerr was elected as a Brexit Party Member of the European Parliament (MEP) for the West Midlands constituency in the 2019 European parliamentary election. Prior to his political career he was a solicitor who specialised in property law. On 29 September 2019, he became an independent MEP after his party withdrew the whip.

== Early life and legal career ==
Andrew Robert England Kerr was born on 23 September 1958 in Birmingham. He qualified as a solicitor in 1985, specialising in property law.

England Kerr founded England Kerr Hands & Co in 1986. He is a director of the company. He is a director at estate agency Englands Estate Agents and a director of England Safety Ltd, producer of specialised equipment for law enforcement and special forces. He is a former vice-chairman of the Federation of Small Business Defence Committee.

== European Parliament ==
He voted for Brexit in the 2016 United Kingdom European Union membership referendum. England Kerr supports Brexit as he felt that the European Union (EU) was corrupt and undemocratic. In previous general elections he had voted for Eurosceptic Labour MP Gisela Stuart in Birmingham Edgbaston.

England Kerr stood as a candidate for the Brexit Party in the 2019 European parliamentary election. He was third on his party's list, and was elected as one of its three MEPs in the West Midlands constituency. In the European Parliament, England Kerr was a member of the Committee on Industry, Research and Energy, and was part of the delegation to the EU-Kazakhstan, EU-Kyrgyzstan, EU-Uzbekistan and EU-Tajikistan Parliamentary Cooperation Committees and for relations with Turkmenistan and Mongolia.

A month after his election, the Brexit Party withdrew the whip from him, citing "irreconcilable differences regarding a likely conflict of interest"; he therefore sat as an independent MEP from that date. Party leader Nigel Farage specified in a television interview that this was in relation to England Kerr "making comments about a business and a product that he has a direct financial investment in".

== Personal life ==
England Kerr is married to Sally, who is the company director of the estate agency Englands Estate Agents.
