= Martin Daubney =

British commentator and journalist (born 1970)

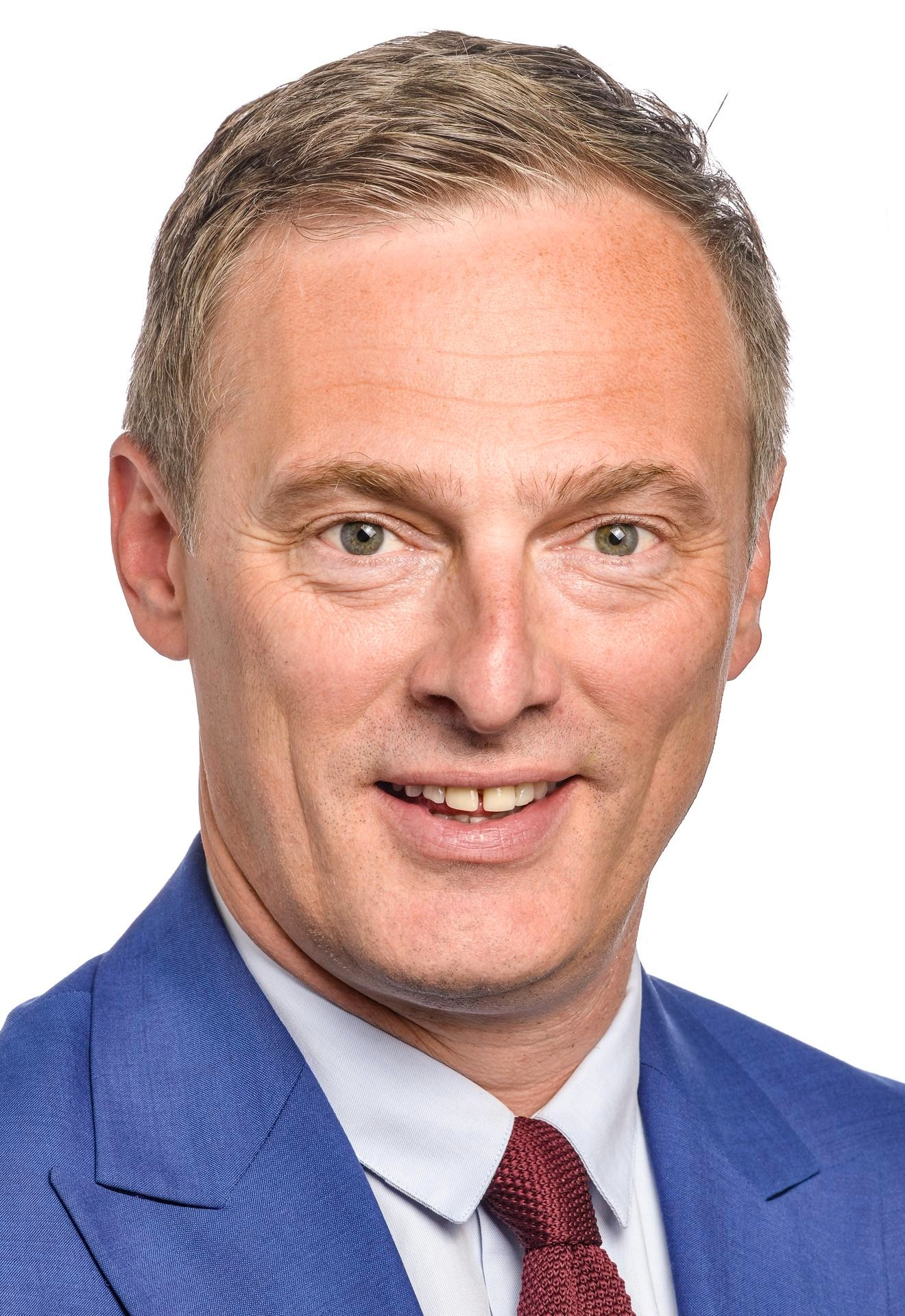
- Daubney in 2019

Deputy Leader of the Reclaim Party
- In office August, 2021 – August, 2022
- Preceded by: Office established
- Succeeded by: Vacant

Member of the European Parliament for West Midlands
- In office 2 July 2019 – 31 January 2020
- Preceded by: Jill Seymour
- Succeeded by: Constituency abolished

Personal details
- Born: Martin Edward Daubney; 22 June 1970 (age 55) Nottingham, Nottinghamshire, England
- Party: Reclaim Party (2021–2022)
- Other political affiliations: Brexit Party (2019); Labour (until 2010)
- Children: 2
- Education: Carlton le Willows School
- Alma mater: University of Manchester (BA)

Martin Edward Daubney (born 22 June 1970) is a British commentator, journalist and former politician who was the deputy leader of the Reclaim Party from 2021 until August 2022. Daubney was a Brexit Party Member of the European Parliament (MEP) for the West Midlands from 2019 to 2020. He was the longest-serving editor of the men's lifestyle magazine Loaded.

== Early life ==
Daubney was born on 22 June 1970 in Nottingham. He grew up in Gedling, Nottinghamshire. His father was a coal miner and his mother was a teacher. He has one sister. He studied geography at the University of Manchester, and was the first man in his family to graduate from university. He graduated with a 2:1 class degree.

== Magazine and television career ==
Daubney's first job in journalism was as a researcher for the women's magazine Bella in 1995. Two years later, he was promoted to commissioning editor. Daubney then became the features editor for the men's lifestyle magazine, FHM in the late 1990s. After this, he was the editor of page3.com for the tabloid newspaper The Sun. He then wrote articles for the sports section of the tabloid newspaper News of the World before becoming the deputy editor of the men's lifestyle magazine Loaded in February 2003. In September that year, he was promoted to editor. In 2005, Loaded increased its depiction of female nudity in an effort to compete with Zoo and Nuts. In a later opinion piece for the Evening Standard, Martin claimed that his days at Loaded "involved boozy photo shoots with topless glamour models and prints with laddish celebs like Ross Kemp and Noel Gallagher". In 2007, he organised a straight pride march as he felt that heterosexuality was being "undermined" and becoming "unfashionable".

Daubney left Loaded in November 2010. He was the longest serving editor of the magazine. After leaving the magazine, he became a "stay-at-home dad", and stated that he had postnatal depression following the birth of his first child.

In 2013, Daubney spent six months making a documentary for Channel 4 on pornography addiction called Porn on the Brain. He supports the men's rights movement.

In October 2023, the media regulator Ofcom ruled that a GB News programme hosted by Daubney breached impartiality and did not give "due weight" to a wide range of views on immigration and asylum policy.

== Political career ==
Daubney was a Labour Party supporter until the election of Ed Miliband as party leader in 2010. He said that he has also voted for the Liberal Democrats and the Women's Equality Party in the past. He voted for the United Kingdom to leave the European Union in the 2016 membership referendum and supported a no-deal Brexit.

On 25 April 2019, it was announced that Daubney would stand for the Brexit Party in the European Parliament election on 23 May. He was second on his party's list in the West Midlands constituency and was elected as one of its three MEPs there. In the European Parliament, he was a member of the Committee on Regional Development and was part of the delegation for relations with the Korean Peninsula.

Daubney was the Brexit Party candidate for Ashfield in the 2019 general election. He finished fourth with 2,501 votes (5.1% of the vote), behind the Conservative, Ashfield Independents and Labour candidates.

In August 2021, Daubney was appointed deputy leader of Laurence Fox's Reclaim Party. Daubney was the party's candidate in the 2021 North Shropshire by-election, finishing seventh with 375 votes (0.98% of the vote).

== Personal life ==
Daubney has a partner and they have two children. They met while working together at The Sun.

== See also ==
- Anti-pornography movement in the United Kingdom
- Lad culture

Media offices
Preceded by Scott Manson	Editor: Loaded; 2003– July 2012	Succeeded by Andy Sherwood
Preceded by	Editor: Page3.com; February 2000 – February 2001	Succeeded by
