= Neena Gill =

British politician

The Right Honourable The Baroness Gill CBE
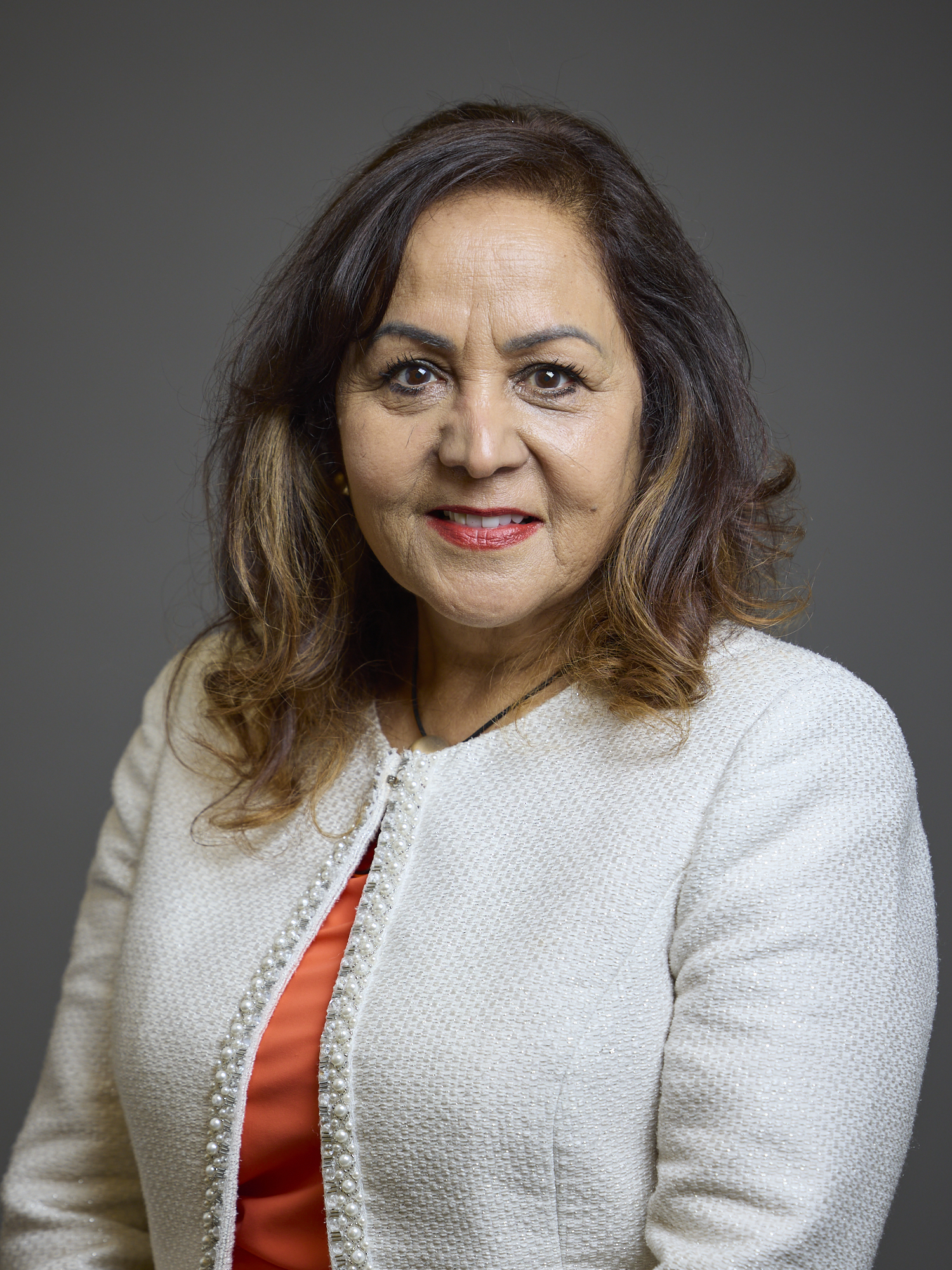
- Official portrait, 2026

Member of the European Parliament for West Midlands
- In office 1 July 2014 – 31 January 2020
- Preceded by: Nikki Sinclaire
- Succeeded by: Constituency abolished
- In office 10 June 1999 – 4 June 2009
- Preceded by: Position established
- Succeeded by: Nikki Sinclaire

Member of the House of Lords
- Lord Temporal
- Life peerage 14 January 2026

Personal details
- Born: Neena Gill; December 24, 1956 (age 69) Ludhiana, Punjab, India
- Party: Labour
- Spouse: John Towner (m. 1982; div. 2009)
- Children: 1
- Education: Liverpool John Moores University; London Business School
- Website: www.neenagillmep.eu

Neena Gill, Baroness Gill CBE (born 24 December 1956) is a British Labour Party politician. She served as a Member of the European Parliament (MEP) for the West Midlands first from 1999 to 2009, and then from 2014 to 2020.

== Early life and career ==
Gill was born in Ludhiana, Punjab, India. She emigrated to the UK with her family when she was ten years old. Her father was a businessman. Gill's first job was working in a library at the age of 16. She graduated with a bachelor's degree in social studies from Liverpool John Moores University in 1979. She was vice president of the students union. Gill later gained a postgraduate professional qualification from the Chartered Institute of Housing in 1984 and in 1996, she completed the senior executive programme at the London Business School.

After graduation, Gill became a trainee accountant but only worked for six weeks before leaving to become a housing officer at Ealing London Borough Council. Aged 29, Gill became the chief executive of ASRA Group, making her the first female, first non-white and youngest chief executive of a UK housing association. She then worked as the chief executive of Newlon Housing Group.

== Political career ==
Prior to Labour's electoral success in 1997, Gill worked with members of Labour's shadow cabinet to help develop the party's social policy. In 1999, she was elected as the first female Asian MEP in the European Parliament. Representing the West Midlands between 1999 and 2009, Gill held various positions, including President of the Delegation for Relations with India and President of the Delegation for Relations with South Asia and SAARC countries. She was also a member of The Legal Affairs Committee and of the Budgets Committee.

Gill was unsuccessful in her bid to be re-elected for a third term as MEP in 2009. During her time outside of parliament, she worked as the vice president for corporate affairs (Europe and Asia Pacific) for software company SAS.

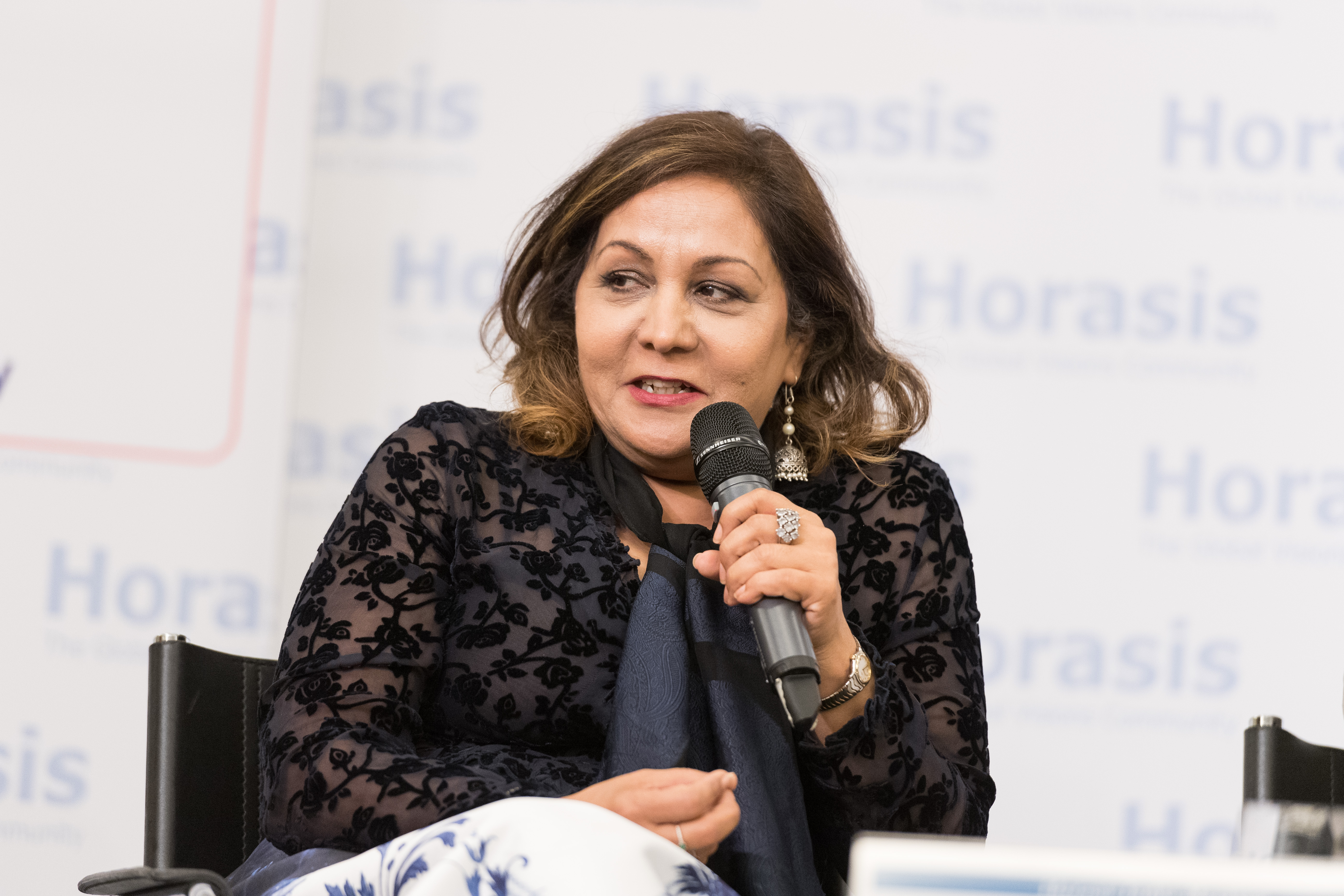
Gill in 2017 discussing Brexit and India

In 2014, she was re-elected as one of two Labour MEPs (the other being Siôn Simon) for the West Midlands. During this term, she was a member of the Committee on Economic and Monetary Affairs, special committee on tax rulings, financial crimes, tax evasion and avoidance, and part of the delegation for relations with India and the United States. She was particularly active on financial regulation and was the rapporteur for the 2015 European Money Market Funds (MMF) Regulation.

In 2017, Gill was one of two UK winners (the other being Conservative MP Priti Patel) of the Pravasi Bharatiya Samman, the highest honour given to NRIs by the Indian government. In the same year, she was appointed Commander of the Order of the British Empire (CBE) in the 2017 New Year Honours. In July 2018, Gill became an honorary fellow of Liverpool John Moores University.

She was re-elected in the 2019 European parliamentary election as the sole Labour MEP for the West Midlands. Gill remained a member of the Committee on Economic and Monetary Affairs. In September 2019, Gill joined the delegation for relations with Japan as Chair and the ACP-EU Joint Parliamentary Assembly as Vice-Chair and S&D Co-ordinator.

In 2024, she was selected as the Labour Party candidate in the Bromsgrove constituency at the 2024 general election. She came second in the contest, receiving 26.8% of the vote share.

In December 2025, as part of the 2025 Political Peerages, Gill was nominated for a life peerage to sit in the House of Lords as a Labour peer; she was created Baroness Gill, of the Jewellery Quarter in the City of Birmingham and of Southall in the London Borough of Ealing, on 14 January 2026.

== Personal life ==
She married Dr. John Towner, an environmental consultant, in 1982 and they have one son. They divorced in 2009.
