= Independence from Europe =

- Leader: Mike Nattrass
- Founded: 20 June 2012
- Dissolved: 2 November 2017
- Headquarters: 48 Fentham Road; Hampton-in-Arden; B92 0AY
- Ideology: Hard Euroscepticism; Direct democracy English devolution

Website
- Independence from Europe

Independence from Europe was a minor, Eurosceptic political party in the United Kingdom. The party was first registered in June 2012 but remained inactive until it was launched in October 2013 by sole party leader Mike Nattrass, a disaffected member of the UK Independence Party (UKIP). It had no official political representation at the time of its dissolution in November 2017, but previously had one Member of the European Parliament (MEP) and three Councillors, all of whom were once members of UKIP.

Nattrass' deselection as a UKIP candidate in August 2013 saw him voluntarily leave the party and after deliberation, launch his own group whilst still an MEP. The party's name changed twice subsequently, largely due to the potential of voters mistaking it with UKIP; use of the word "Independence" in both parties' names proved particularly contentious, prompting two separate investigations by the Electoral Commission. Virtually all commentators dismissed the party as a means for disgruntled former UKIP members to confuse the electorate and split their previous party's support, an allegation Independence from Europe denied. This is despite the party costing UKIP between one and three seats at the 2014 European Parliament election, for which Nattrass' group is perhaps best known. Collecting 1.49% of the national vote, it proved to be their most successful election, although the party never had a candidate elected to any office.

It shared a similar right-wing policy platform with UKIP, with Nattrass stating as such amid the party's launch. Key policies included withdrawing the UK from the European Union (EU), prioritising relations with the Commonwealth of Nations and introducing more stringent measures on immigration. It further supported widespread use of referendums, promoting English devolution and abolishing the National Assembly for Wales. Nattrass placed his party to the left of UKIP, however, due to both the party's general opposition to privatisation and its proposed nationalisation of targeted infrastructure and amenities.

== History ==
=== Background and formation ===
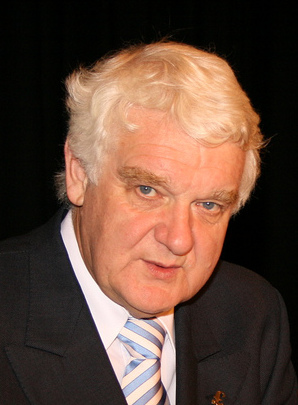
Founder and sole party leader, Mike Nattrass

Before establishing the party, Mike Nattrass had long been involved with Britain's Eurosceptic movement. In 1994, Nattrass joined the right-wing New Britain Party and unsuccessfully stood for the group in the Dudley West by-election of the same year. Alike most New Britain candidates, Nattrass was absorbed into and stood in Solihull for the single-issue Referendum Party at the 1997 general election. Led by James Goldsmith, this party's policy was for a referendum to be held on the UK's relationship with the European Union (EU), specifically as to whether the British population wanted to be part of a federal Europe or a free-trade bloc without wider political functions. Nattrass subsequently joined the UK Independence Party (UKIP) and eventually rose to the positions of Party Chairman and Deputy Leader. As the UKIP candidate, he was elected as a representative for the West Midlands constituency in the 2004 European Parliament election, and was re-elected in 2009.

Nattrass failed a candidacy assessment in August 2013 and was duly deselected as UKIP candidate for the 2014 election, prompting him to initiate unsuccessful legal action against the party. He duly left UKIP and was in talks with the English Democrats, but cancelled plans to ally with them after they prematurely announced his joining the party. Nattrass, still a Member of the European Parliament (MEP), instead launched his own party after considering a career as an independent. An Independence Party's creation was announced in October 2013, being renamed An Independence from Europe on 7 March 2014 to avoid confusion with UKIP. Nattrass had previously considered the label 4 A Referendum. Electoral Commission records show that he had registered his own party significantly earlier, on 20 June 2012. From this date, he had also been filing financial statements for the fledgling, albeit inactive, organisation. The new party's development benefited from an incident in September 2013 when a Lincolnshire County Councillor, Chris Pain, was expelled from UKIP over an internal controversy. Fellow UKIP Councillors Alan Jesson and John Beaver supported Pain's innocence and were also expelled from the party for plotting to form a breakaway faction. All three became members of Nattrass' party and proceeded to represent their wards accordingly.

=== European Parliament election and controversy ===
An Independence from Europe fielded 60 candidates in the 2014 European Parliament election, proposing representatives for each of England's nine constituencies. The most notable of whom were Nattrass, who sought re-election in the West Midlands, and Laurence Stassen, a Dutch MEP who had recently left the Party for Freedom (PVV) and was vying for election in the South East England region. Stassen's unusual standing for the party "demonstrate[d] the extent to which MEPs whose true ambition is to remain in the European Parliament will go in order to remain in their seat" according to political scientist William T. Daniel. The party did not stand candidates in the Wales, Scotland or Northern Ireland constituencies. Campaigning for the election included a nationwide party political broadcast through the BBC on 8 May (Note: The party admitted that the broadcast featured recycled footage from UKIP's 2005 general election advertisement, which Nattrass still owned the rights to. Included in this footage was the EU, represented as a giant octopus, causing havoc and destruction among London's political institutions.) and Nattrass' appearance on Daily Politics, where he was interviewed by Andrew Neil on 14 May. Despite claiming it would receive more than 10% of the national vote and elect up to four MEPs, the party only collected 1.49% (235,124 ballots) and all candidates were defeated. Finishing seventh, it was the highest placed party not to elect an MEP; it polled more votes than the British National Party (BNP), which was defending two seats.

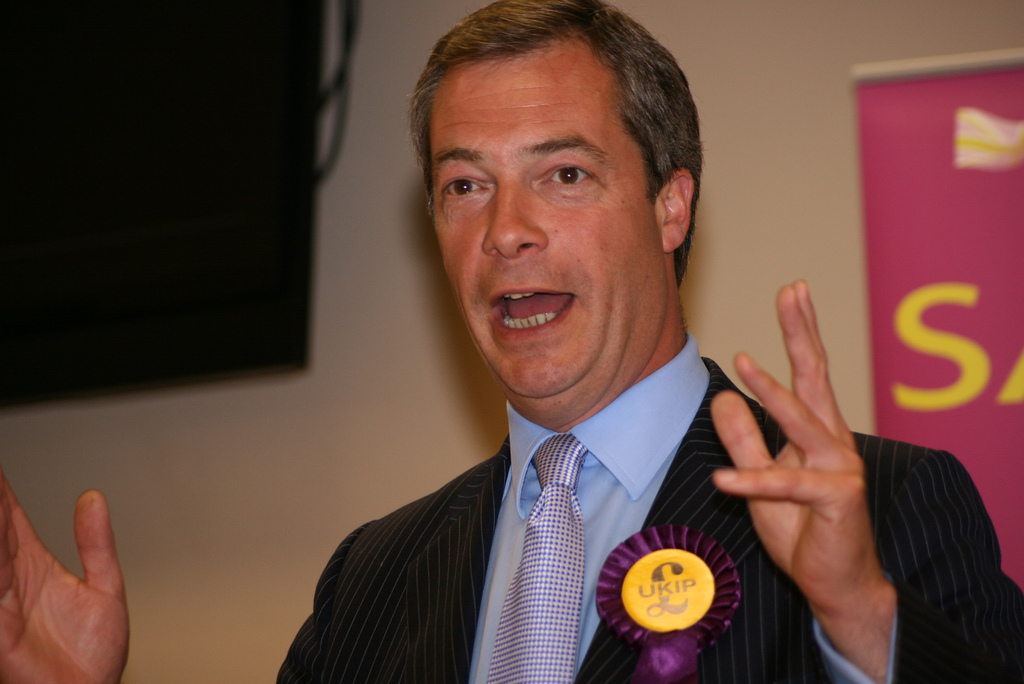
Nigel Farage (pictured) claimed the party was "given the green light to dupe voters" by the Electoral Commission.

Previously, pressure had come from UKIP for the party to change its name and official tagline, 'UK Independence Now', believing it was a strategy to split their vote. This, in addition to the use of 'An' at the beginning of the party name, placing them highest alphabetically on the ballot paper, prompted an investigation by the Electoral Commission at the request of UKIP. Nattrass remarked "UKIP does not have sole right to the word independence" and the Commission soon dismissed the complaint. Notwithstanding, UKIP claimed the party's similar name unfairly cost them a seat in South West England to the benefit of the Green Party, with Nattrass' group acquiring around 23,000 votes in the region. UKIP's then-leader Nigel Farage later complained "[a]llowing Nattrass to launch a party with that name was shocking and showed the absolute contempt that the establishment have for us ... they were given the green light to dupe voters." Political scientists Matthew Goodwin and Caitlin Milazzo concur, calling it "a deliberate attempt to confuse voters and damage Nattrass's old party."

The party's credibility was further attacked by commentators reporting the affair; Christopher Hope of The Daily Telegraph dismissed the group as being "set up late last year to confuse voters who were trying to back Ukip". Journalist Donal Blaney further labelled them "hitherto unheard-of" outside the incident. Blaney also invokes Mike Smithson's opinion that if UKIP had acquired the minor party's overall vote share, it would have won two additional seats; Farage posited "some think it cost us three." In response to the incident, citing his deselection, Nattrass retorted "[d]id [Farage] expect me just to melt away? No, I am going down with my flag." A second review by the Commission found the name was unsuitable and the party became Independence from Europe on 23 February 2015, in time for that year's general election.

=== Domestic elections and downfall ===
At the 2015 general election, the party contested five constituencies, despite previously indicating it would vie for ten. These were the Lincolnshire seats of Boston and Skegness and Brigg and Goole alongside the West Midlands seats of Meriden and Solihull; additionally contested was Cheadle, a constituency in Greater Manchester. Nattrass once again appeared on Daily Politics, interviewed by Jo Coburn on 1 April. No candidates were elected and the party accumulated a negligible vote share. Local elections in the same year saw the party unsuccessfully contest eight wards on East Lindsey District Council, with an additional candidate failing in his bid for election to Leicester City Council. The following year's local elections saw the party field a candidate for Exeter City Council, who was comfortably defeated. A day later, the party contested a local by-election for Croydon London Borough Council triggered by the resignation of Emily Benn; the party finished second last, above Winston McKenzie of the English Democrats. Independence from Europe failed to field any candidates in the 2017 local elections; incumbent Councillors Alan Jesson and John Beaver did not seek re-election and Chris Pain defected to the Lincolnshire Independents, leaving the party with no official political representation. The party did not contest any constituencies at the 2017 general election. It was "statutorily deregistered" by the Electoral Commission on 2 November of that year.

== Ideology and policies ==
Little to no academic commentary has been conducted with regard to the party's ideology. Upon its launch in 2013, Nattrass implied "it will have similar right wing ideals as UKIP", only to assert a year later that "we are not the same, we are to the left of UKIP." He subsequently repeated the line in 2015. Aside from any ideological reason, the party was founded out of a general disaffection with UKIP's management, particularly leader Nigel Farage and Party Chairman Steve Crowther, who left members feeling "dictated to". That said, the party stated in 2014 that some UKIP MEPs were frustrated at the party's 2009 effort in creating, and embracing, the Europe of Freedom and Democracy (EFD) group in the European Parliament. Right-wing populist in ideology, Nattrass labelled EFD as "probably obnoxious" and temporarily left the group whilst an MEP. (Note: Nattrass first left EFD on 23 June 2010 to become a Non-Inscrit UKIP MEP; five days before, his colleague Nikki Sinclaire refused to renew her allegiance to the grouping. He subsequently rejoined on 11 December 2012, but left again on 9 September 2013 as a result of his resignation from UKIP.) Despite calling Farage a "totalitarian", Nattrass maintained "I support the principles UKIP stands for" whilst protesting his deselection in court. The party claimed to advocate a society comprising "[p]ersonal freedom with personal responsibility", supported by what it saw as "traditional commonsense policies".

=== Constitutional and legislative policy ===
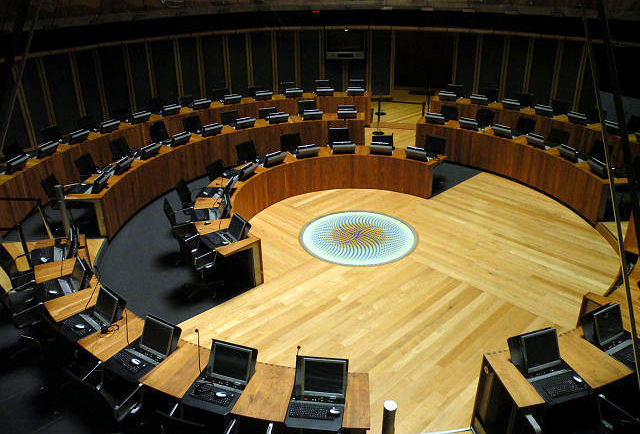
The party favoured the abolition of the National Assembly for Wales (pictured).

Independence from Europe's primary policy was to guarantee that the United Kingdom left the European Union (EU). This included its legal accessories, promising a withdrawal from the European Convention on Human Rights (ECHR). The party advocated the increased use of direct democracy, namely through referendums. Petitions with support from more than 5% of the electorate would trigger a national referendum on a respective issue, with the outcome legally binding by default. Conversely, Nattrass stated in 2014 that his party was averse to the idea of a nationwide vote on the UK's membership of the EU, calling for "MPs with backbone" to ensure a departure was delivered.

The party advocated sweeping reforms of the UK's legislative process. These included a reduction of the number of Members of Parliament (MPs) in the House of Commons by one third (650 to 430) and the replacement of the House of Lords with an elected upper chamber. Scheduled debates would have been introduced, upon which members for Northern Irish, Scottish and Welsh constituencies would return to their devolved legislatures, leaving the UK Parliament to discuss English affairs exclusively. The party repeatedly advocated the abolition of the National Assembly for Wales, however, at one time adopting the tagline 'Abolish Assembly and leave European Union'; it suggested a referendum be held in Wales over the matter. Devolved legislatures' membership would have no longer consisted of politicians elected specifically to those chambers (i.e. MLAs, MSPs or AMs), but would have instead comprised those UK MPs returning routinely from the national parliament.

On an individual basis, MPs would have been paid and claimed expenses in-line with existing British civil service guidelines. If elected, the party claimed it would "[b]uild a condominium to house MP's whilst they reside in London" and scrap their second home allowances. Legislators would have been accountable by way of an 'Independent Politicians Complaints Commission', with its members chosen by designated non-governmental organisations (NGOs). Furthermore, the activities of political parties would have faced greater regulation; whips would have been removed from the select committee appointment process and party sanctioning against rebellious MPs disallowed.

=== Economic policy ===
The party claimed that by disowning tariffs and restrictions imposed by the European Union Customs Union (EUCU) the UK could focus on adopting amicable free trade with the Commonwealth of Nations. The party would have further sought to reduce unemployment by limiting the proportion of migrant work imported from EU member states, as well as attempted to lower Council Tax by scrapping the fiscal implications of the union's Landfill Directive. Independence from Europe claimed that by abandoning the EU, and thus the cost of membership, the UK's national debt could have been cleared. Domestic budgetary policies included the raising of personal allowance to £15,000, broad simplification of both personal and corporate tax and opposition to zero-hours contracts. In addition, the party condoned the forced collection of tax from evaders and the nationalisation of private finance initiatives (PFIs).

=== Energy, environment and transport policy ===
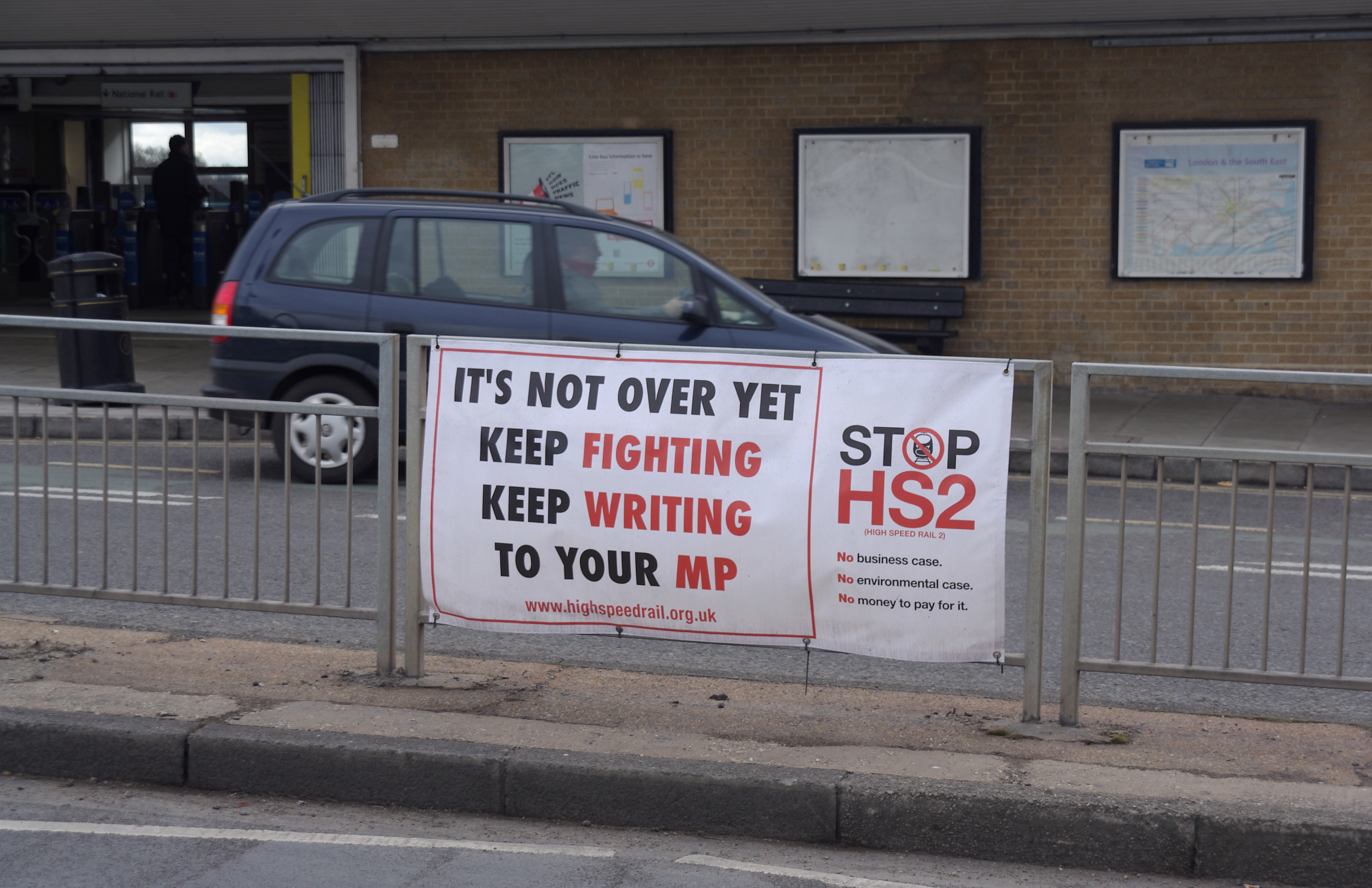
Scrapping plans for the High Speed 2 (HS2) railway has been described among the party's "key policies".

The party opposed government subsidy of wind turbines and instead proposed the increased use of clean coal technology and nuclear fusion to address the UK's energy shortage. This would have been accompanied by a state-owned 'Public British Energy Company', a measure that the party hoped would keep consumer costs affordable. The party would also have abandoned catch quotas set by the EU's Common Fisheries Policy and established 'no fishing zones' to ensure plentiful stocks.

In transport policy, Independence from Europe was generally skeptical of large-scale developments. BBC News characterised the group's opposition to the construction of the High Speed 2 (HS2) railway as among "[i]ts key policies"; the group further warned against expansion of London's Standsted and Gatwick airports, as well as the introduction of a third runway at Heathrow. Furthermore, the party sought to abolish toll roads and nationalise UK railway franchises "if they fail[ed] in viability or in their contractual obligations."

=== Foreign, defence and immigration policy ===
The group sought to re-establish "traditional links" with the Commonwealth of Nations, believing that the UK had "lost invaluable trading links, respect and friendship" with the organisation since joining the EU. Independence from Europe twice asserted that the UK misspends foreign aid on countries wealthy enough to fund independent space programs, it suggested such funding should be diverted to support Britain's elderly population. In defence policy, the party pledged to increase the number of armed forces personnel to 200,000 and reduce the number of British troops sent to fight abroad, further encouraging the United Nations (UN) to take more responsibility over international security.

Independence from Europe called for stricter immigration policy to be implemented in the UK, but refused to set a statistical migration target. It supported an 'Australian-style' points-based system to regulate immigration once the UK had left the European Economic Area (EEA), (Note: Australia issues visas to candidates who accumulate an acceptable number of 'points' to be considered a skilled migrant; points are conditional on criteria such as age, competency in the English language, qualifications and current/past occupation(s).) citing pressures on population growth, housing and infrastructure. Foreigners would also have faced more stringent rules once they had arrived; temporary visitors would have had to carry identification at all times, as well as resided in the UK for at least 10 years before becoming eligible for British citizenship. Such measures, the party hoped, would justify the reintroduction of the country's work permit scheme.

=== Social policy ===
The party supported the maintenance of Britain's National Health Service (NHS) to be free at the point of delivery and described itself as "dead against privatisation" of the institution. Whilst reducing bureaucracy in the NHS, the party would also have aimed to invest a further £5 billion to train 40,000 more nurses in addition to 10,000 extra doctors. Free dental and eye treatment would have been restored and foreign visitors would be required to possess private medical insurance during their time in the UK. It sought to return more community services, like the NHS, into public ownership where they had been privatised entirely or in-part, including prisons and the Post Office. It would have reserved the UK's wider welfare system to cater exclusively for British citizens; they would also have limited the amount of tax credits a childless, able-bodied citizen could receive to 80% of the weekly national minimum wage as well as restricted child benefit payments for households with more than two juveniles and/or a combined annual income of over £50,000. Independence from Europe supported and sought to extend tenants' 'Right to Buy' council and housing association properties.

To address crime, the party sought to deport foreign offenders, extend neighborhood watch schemes and hold a referendum on restoring capital punishment in the UK. It further pledged to invest £2.5 billion into the police service, promising to recruit 10,000 more officers. In addition, the group would have reformed education policy by aiming to cut school class sizes and scrapping tuition fees for UK students attending British universities; conversely, all foreign students would have been required to pay in full.

== See also ==
- Independence from Europe election results
