= Philip Bushill-Matthews =

British politician (1943–2023)

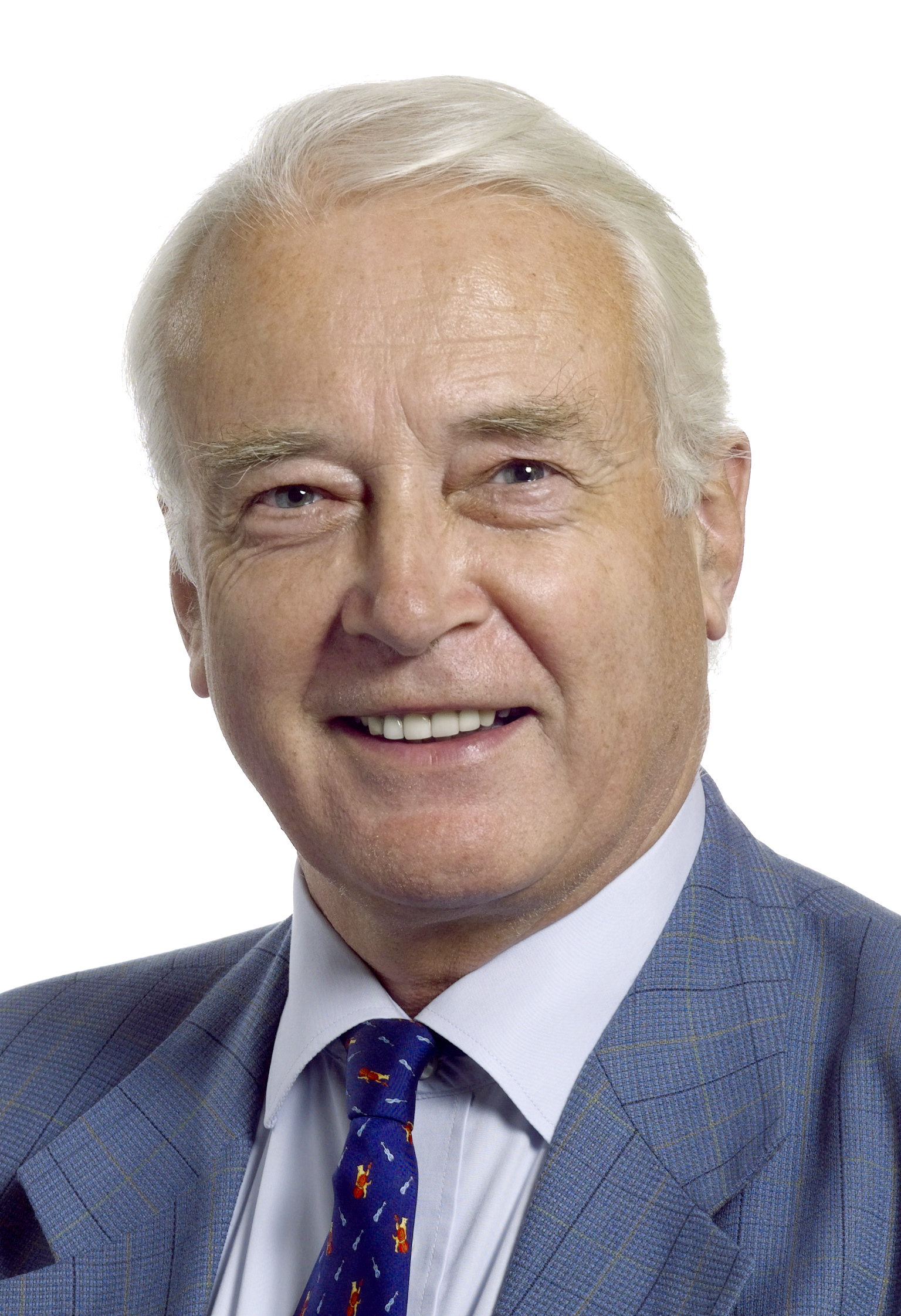

Member of the European Parliament for West Midlands
- In office 10 June 1999 – 4 June 2009
- Preceded by: Position established
- Succeeded by: Anthea McIntyre^{[a]}

Personal details
- Born: 15 January 1943 Droitwich Spa, Worcestershire, England
- Died: 10 December 2023 (aged 80) Coventry, England
- Party: Liberal Democrats, (Conservatives before September 2019)
- Occupation: Politician
- a. Office vacant from 4 June 2009 – 30 November 2011

Philip Bushill-Matthews (15 January 1943 – 10 December 2023) was a British politician who was Conservative Party Member of the European Parliament (MEP) for the West Midlands.

== Biography ==
At Oxford University he became President of the O.U. Broadcasting Society, and Secretary of the O.U. Dramatic Society (OUDS) in succession to Michael York, with whom he acted in Braham Murray's touring productions of A Man for All Seasons and Ionesco's Rhinoceros.

After graduating he joined Unilever as a Graduate Trainee, spending much of his career at Birds Eye, becoming the youngest director of Birds Eye Wall's Ltd in 1981 at the age of 38. Overall he spent some thirty years in food manufacturing running businesses in the UK, Portugal and the Netherlands. Unhappy about the general lack of business experience among politicians from all parties he decided to enter politics himself and was elected to the European Parliament representing his home region of the West Midlands in 1999. He was then re-elected for a second five-year term in 2004, this time as head of the Conservative regional list. In addition to his position as MEP, he was a former leader of the Conservative group in Brussels.

In his first term, as a member of the Environment and Public Health Committee he played an important role in negotiating amendments to the Chocolate Directive, which would finally enable British dairy milk chocolate to be sold throughout the EU. Meanwhile, fed up with the response from the Labour Government back home to the continued boycott of British beef by France for blatantly protectionist reasons, he joined ten other colleagues in a demonstration in Paris in autumn 1999. They carried a banner with the slogan 'Marie Antoinette said "Let them eat cake", British Conservative MEPs say "Let them eat British beef".'

Bushill-Matthews was appointed Conservative Spokesman for Employment & Social Affairs immediately following his first election as an MEP, and held this position for ten years. In 2007 he was also elected Co-ordinator for Employment and Social Affairs for the Group of the European People's Party and European Democrats. His aim was to ensure that EU legislation was proportionate and realistic, and employment opportunities helped not hindered in the process. He was instrumental in preserving the UK individual opt-out from the Working Time Directive and promoting Corporate Social Responsibility as voluntary. German MEPs called him Philip the Fighter because of his tenacity in persuading colleagues to support his legislative arguments.

Having been elected Deputy Leader of the Conservative MEPs in November 2007, in June 2008 Bushill-Matthews was elected Leader after Giles Chichester chose to step down in order to clear his name following allegations of withdrawing parliamentary funds for private use. During his leadership he put in place a 'Right to Know' system whereby Conservative MEPs openly declared their expenses on line. While Leader he fell out briefly with David Cameron who wanted to pull Conservative MEPs out of the EPP-ED Group in the middle of the 2004-9 Parliamentary term, despite the fact that his predecessor (and each of the individual MEPs) had signed a binding commitment to stay in for the full five-year period.

Bushill-Matthews did not submit his name for re-selection at the 2009 European elections and stood down as MEP in June 2009. In 2011 he was appointed a non-executive director of the Coventry and Warwickshire Partnership NHS Trust, and elected vice-chairman in 2012. He briefly came out of political retirement in 2016 to campaign for Remain during the 2016 referendum: his constituency of Warwick & Leamington was one of two constituencies in the West Midlands to vote to stay in along with neighbouring Kenilworth & Southam.

Bushill-Matthews was the author of The Gravy Train published in 2003 (with a foreword by William Hague) and Who Rules Britannia? in 2005. His third book, The Eras of La Gomera, was published in summer 2018. He is a Fellow of the Institute of Directors.

In September 2019, Bushill-Matthews joined the Liberal Democrats.

Bushill-Matthews died after a long illness in Coventry, on 10 December 2023, at the age of 80.

== Education ==
- 1950–1956: [Edgbaston Preparatory School (Hallfield)]
- 1956–1962: Malvern College
- 1962–1965: MA (English Language and Literature), University College, Oxford
- 1987: Harvard Business School: six-week Advanced Management Program
- 2015: BA Hons First Class in Archaeology, University of Leicester

== Career ==
- 1965: Joined Unilever
- 1976: Seconded to Thomas Lipton Inc., U.S.
- 1977: National Accounts Director, Birds Eye Sales Ltd
- 1980: Managing Director, Iglo Indústrias de Gelados, Lisbon
- 1981: Sales Director, later Sales & Distribution Director Birds Eye Wall's Ltd
- 1988: Managing Director, Craigmillar Ltd, and Director, Van den Bergh and Jurgens Ltd
- 1991: Managing Director, Red Mill Snack Foods Ltd, Wednesbury, West Midlands, and Managing Director, Red Mill Company BV, Netherlands
- 1999: Conservative MEP, European Parliament; and Conservative Spokesman for Employment & Social Affairs, European Parliament
- 2003: Author of 'The Gravy Train'
- 2005: Author of 'Who Rules Britannia?'
- 2007: Deputy Leader of Conservative MEPs, European Parliament
- 2007: Co-ordinator for Employment and Social Affairs for European Peoples' Party and European Democrats
- 2008: Leader of Conservative MEPs
- 2011: Non-executive director of the Coventry and Warwickshire Partnership NHS Trust
- 2012: Vice-chairman of the Coventry and Warwickshire Partnership NHS Trust
- 2018: Author of 'The Eras of La Gomera'
