= Bill Etheridge =

UKIP politician (born 1970)

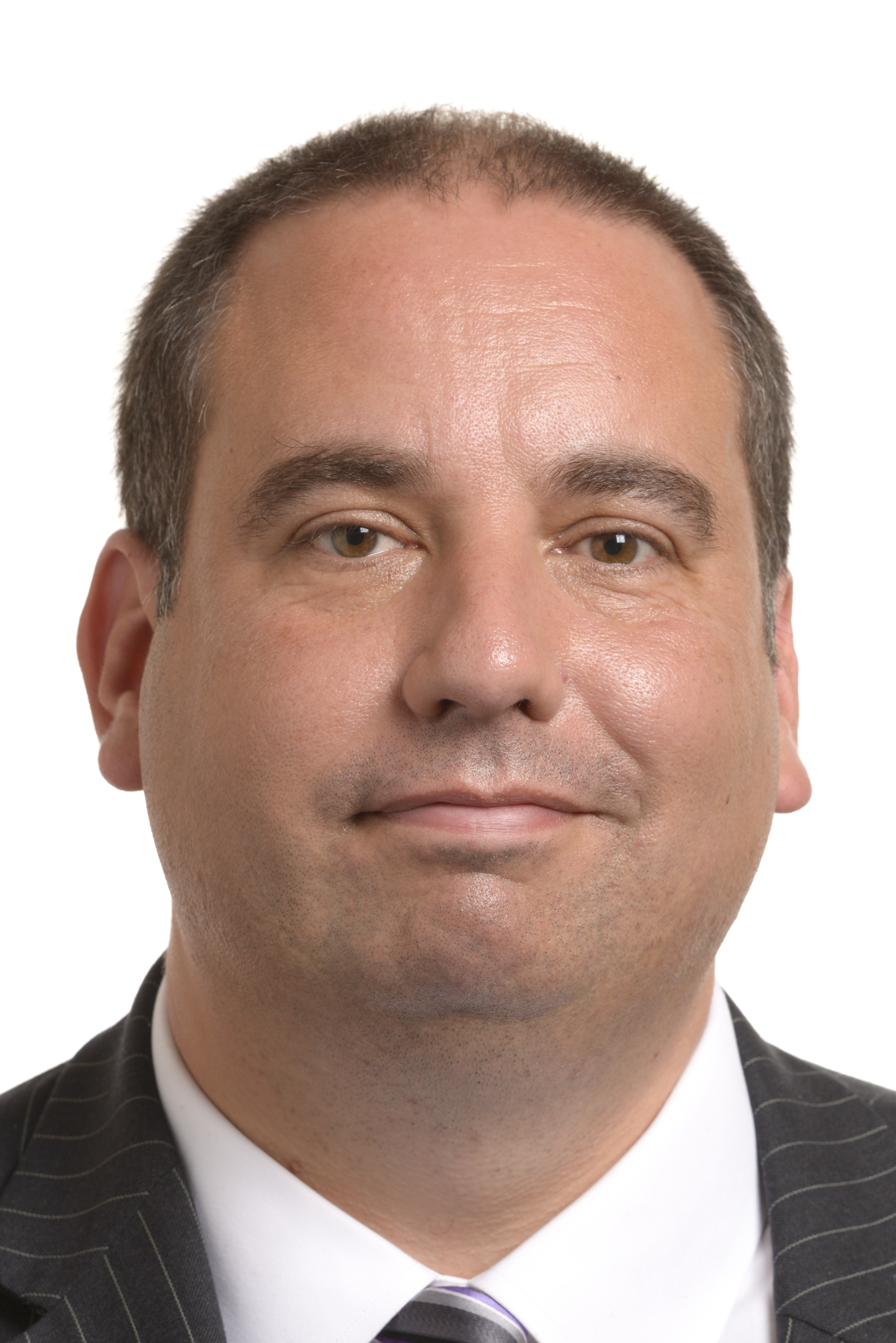

UKIP spokesperson for defence
- In office 29 November 2016 – 15 January 2018
- Leader: Paul Nuttall; Henry Bolton
- Preceded by: Mike Hookem
- Succeeded by: Henry Bolton

Member of the European Parliament for West Midlands
- In office 1 July 2014 – 1 July 2019
- Preceded by: Malcolm Harbour
- Succeeded by: Andrew Kerr

Personal details
- Born: William Milroy Etheridge; 18 March 1970 (age 56) Wolverhampton, England
- Party: Conservative (2008–2011; 2024–Present)
- Other political affiliations: UKIP (2011–2018; 2020–2024); Brexit Party (2019–2020); Libertarian (2018–2019); Thurrock Independents (2018)
- Education: Dudley College; University of Wolverhampton

William Milroy Etheridge (born 18 March 1970) is an English politician who was a Member of the European Parliament (MEP) for the West Midlands region. He was elected in 2014 as a UK Independence Party (UKIP) candidate, but left the party in October 2018. He briefly joined the Thurrock Independents before joining the Libertarian Party and serving as its deputy chairman. In 2019, he left the Libertarian Party and joined the Brexit Party, before rejoining UKIP in September 2020. He stood unsuccessfully for UKIP leader in 2016 and 2024.

== Early life ==
Etheridge was educated at Parkfield High School, Wolverhampton Polytechnic (now University of Wolverhampton) and Dudley College.

Etheridge joined the Conservative Party in 2008. Both he and his wife, Star, unsuccessfully stood as Conservative candidates in the Dudley Metropolitan Borough Council elections in 2010. In March 2011, they resigned from the Conservatives after their membership was suspended following complaints from party members that they were photographed posing with knitted golliwogs on their Facebook profile pages as part of a protest against political correctness. They joined the UK Independence Party and he stood, unsuccessfully, as UKIP candidate in the Dudley council elections in 2011 and 2012.

== Political career ==
Etheridge stood for UKIP in the 2011 local election. In 2012, he stood in the West Midlands Police and Crime Commissioner election for UKIP; he finished fourth with 17,563 votes (7.37%).

=== Member of the European Parliament ===
In 2014, as well as being elected to the European Parliament, he was also elected as a councillor for the Sedgley ward on Dudley Metropolitan Borough Council, unseating a Conservative. His wife, Star, was also elected for UKIP in the Coseley East ward. Etheridge lost his seat on Dudley MBC in the May 2018 local council elections.

In August 2014, Etheridge highlighted the speaking style of Adolf Hitler during a public-speaking seminar he gave to members of the UKIP youth wing, including the dangers it presented. According to Etheridge, he was "the most magnetic and forceful public speaker possibly in history" who "achieved a great deal" in relation to convincing people. A spokesman for UKIP said: "Bill Etheridge gave a seminar on public speaking and highlighted great speakers of the past, like Churchill, Blair, Martin Luther King and Hitler as people whose style, not content could be studied". When contacted by The Independent on Sunday, Etheridge stated that "Hitler and the Nazis were monsters" and said "At no point did I endorse Hitler or anybody else".

At the general election in May 2015, Etheridge stood as UKIP's parliamentary candidate for Dudley North. He finished third with a vote of 9,113, triple that of the vote in 2010. At 24% of the votes cast, it also represented double the national average for UKIP.

Etheridge, who is also a member of the Campaign for Real Ale (CAMRA), has been active in the UKIP front campaign; West Midlands Save The Pub. He has urged the Conservative government to increase the power of the Asset of Community Value, brought in as part of the Localism Act 2011. This would enable local communities to acquire their local pubs. This did lead to Etheridge making efforts to save a number of pubs in his ward, including The Seven Stars.

Etheridge sat on the EU Regional Development Committee; his belief that power should be handed back to communities has seen him emerge as a critic of combined authorities.

Etheridge is an associate of the American Legislative Exchange Council (ALEC).

In May 2017, Etheridge launched his book; Putting Great Back In Britain, with a guest appearance from Nigel Farage. In the book, Etheridge outlines his vision for a post-Brexit Britain.

Etheridge is a prominent UK libertarian and is chairman of The Indigo Group. He has launched a platform of libertarian policies in his EFDD book, Prosperous, Happy and at Peace, co-authored with Paul Brothwood.

Etheridge launched a book, The EU's engagement with the politics of international recognition, co-authored with Paul Brothwood, at an EU conference about Somaliland on 6 December 2018.

==== Resignation from UKIP and subsequent MEP activity ====
Etheridge left UKIP on 2 October 2018, saying the party is seen by voters as a "vehicle of hate towards Muslims and the Gay community". He remained part of the Europe of Freedom and Direct Democracy group in the European Parliament, sitting for a brief period as a Thurrock Independents MEP.

At the Liberty Rising Conference on 6 October 2018, Etheridge announced he had joined the Libertarian Party. He became its deputy chairman. After sitting with the Thurrock Independents from 2 October, he formally became a Libertarian Party MEP on 8 October 2018. In February 2019, Etheridge left to join the Brexit Party, whom he represented for the remainder of his term. After this change in allegiance, he ceased to serve as the deputy chairman of the Libertarian Party.

=== UKIP leadership bids ===
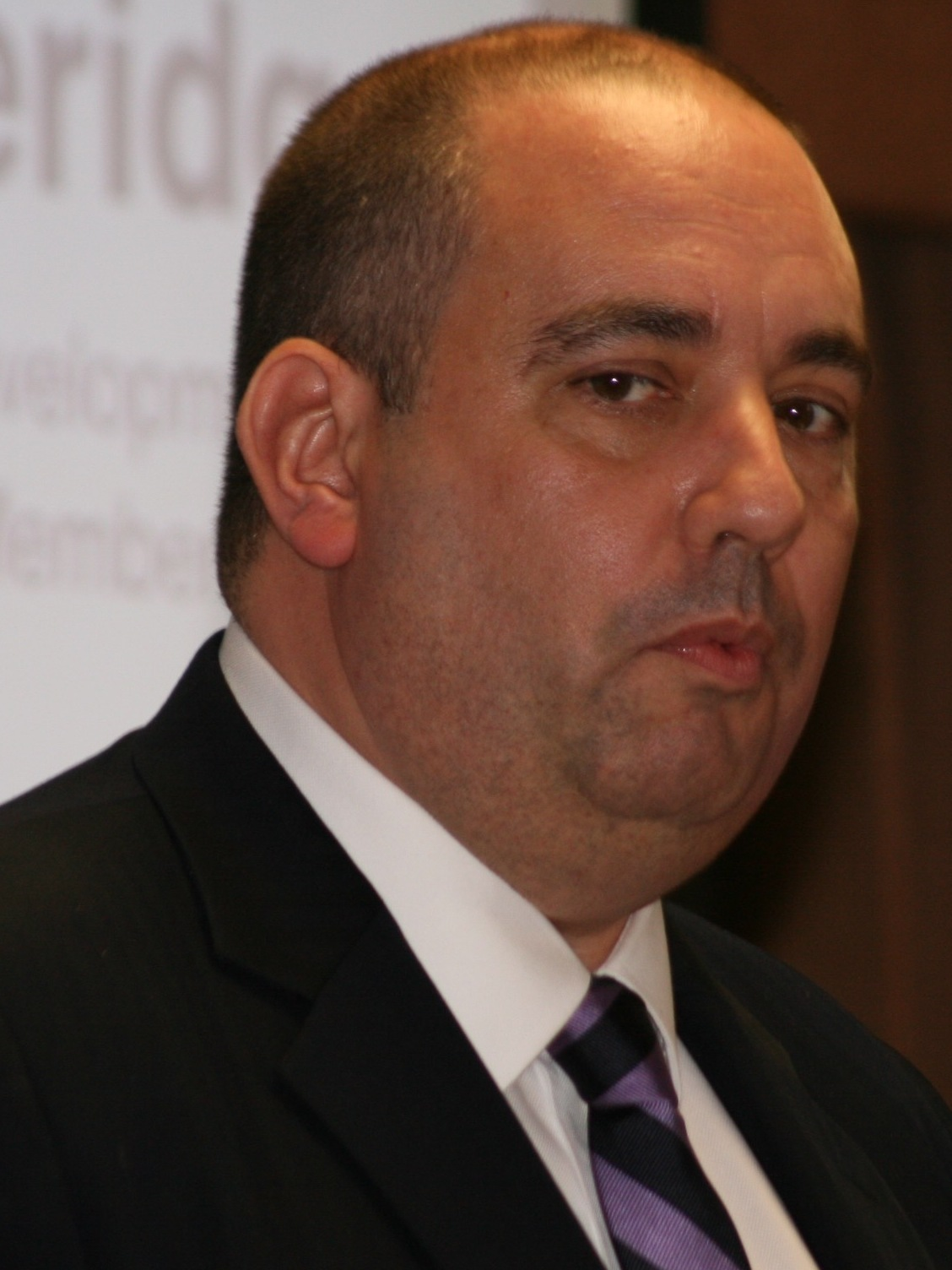
Etheridge in 2016

In July 2016, Etheridge launched his bid to become leader of UKIP following the resignation of Nigel Farage. Launching his campaign at the Seven Stars pub in Sedgley, Etheridge said: "I want us to represent the view of the people against the establishment". Etheridge received 13.7% of the vote, with the third-most votes cast. He promised to work and support with the new leader, Diane James, who was only briefly in the post. His policy proposals included cheaper beer, better representation for fathers in the family court system and a referendum on bringing back the death penalty. Also amongst his policy proposals were prison reform and a move to save the British public house by reintroducing smoking via the use of efficient extraction systems as used within the European Parliament itself. While in favour of Muslim faith schools and same-sex marriage, he advocates banning the burka.

In October 2016, Etheridge launched his bid to become leader of UKIP following Diane James's resignation, after declaring he would refuse to back Steven Woolfe and stand himself during an interview on the BBC's Sunday Politics. He withdrew on 25 October, and endorsed the eventual winner, Paul Nuttall.

Etheridge subsequently launched his third leadership bid for the 2017 UK Independence Party leadership election, having previously stood in both of UKIP's 2016 leadership elections. A key divide between candidates was between what The Guardian described as "Farage-ist economic libertarians" like Etheridge and the "more hard-right, Islam-focused" Anne Marie Waters and Peter Whittle. Etheridge stated that "whichever side wins, the other side won't have a future in the party". On 26 July 2017, two days before close of nominations, Etheridge withdrew his candidacy.

He announced his intention to run again for the party leadership in the 2018 leadership election, but withdrew and backed Gerard Batten.

In the 2024 leadership election, Etheridge stood for the position, alongside Lois Perry, to succeed Neil Hamilton. He came second to Perry, receiving 20.89% of the vote. Etheridge congratulated Perry on X over her "resounding victory, adding "she has my full support." In an interview with broadcaster James Freeman a month later, however, he expressed doubt over how the election was conducted. Etheridge said: “I’m prepared to believe that a large number of activists and people involved in the party appeared to have voted for me, yet the vote turned out to be about 80% to 20% to Lois… So, I’m prepared to believe that a lot of people who aren’t actually active members must have voted, and all voted for Lois. I’m prepared to believe that…" When Freeman put to him that Perry may have been convinced by Reform UK leader Nigel Farage, and their sitting MP Lee Anderson, to collapse UKIP, Etheridge responded with: “What an interesting theory. I couldn’t possibly comment on that theory other than to say I find it fascinating…”

=== Post-MEP career ===
In September 2020, Etheridge rejoined UKIP and became the party's economics spokesman.

In October 2025, he was announced as Conservative Candidate for Dudley Council for the May 2026 elections.

At the 2024 general election, Etheridge endorsed Conservative candidate Marco Longhi for Dudley North, warning voters not to "be taken in by any shallow, fake Brexiteers." Searchlight later reported that Etheridge had resigned from UKIP during the election campaign, amid doubts over the integrity of the party leadership.
