= Anthea McIntyre =

British politician

Anthea McIntyre CBE
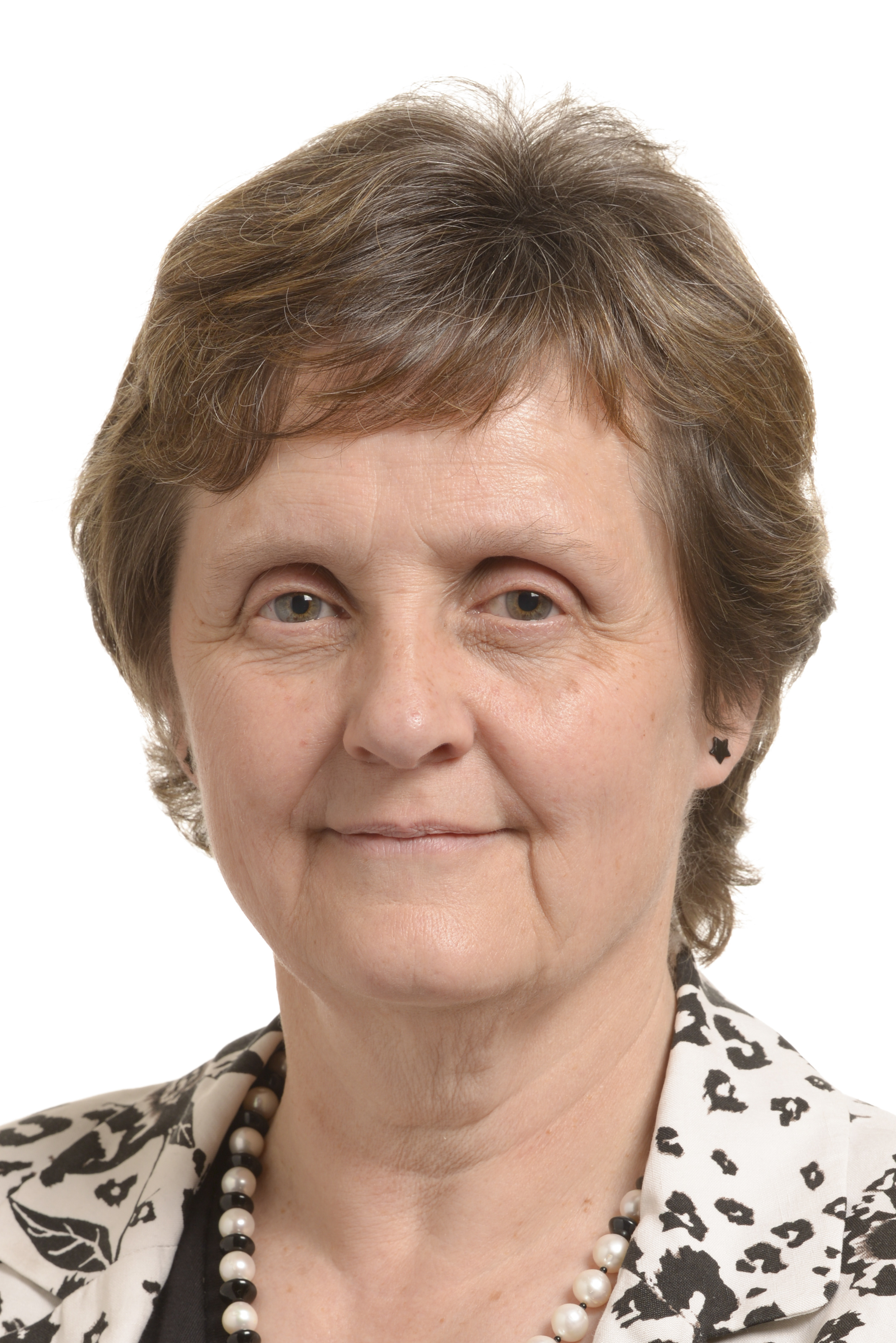

Deputy Chairman of the Conservative Party
- In office 17 July 2016 – 22 September 2016
- Leader: Theresa May
- Chairman: Patrick McLoughlin
- Preceded by: Robert Halfon
- Succeeded by: Amanda Sater

Member of the European Parliament for West Midlands
- In office 1 December 2011 – 31 January 2020
- Preceded by: Philip Bushill-Matthews (Note: Office vacant from 4 June 2009 to 30 November 2011.)
- Succeeded by: Constituency abolished

Personal details
- Born: London, England
- Party: Conservative
- Spouse: Frank Myers
- Education: Claremont School; Queen's College, London
- Occupation: Politician

Anthea Elizabeth Joy McIntyre, CBE (born 29 June 1954) is a British Conservative Party politician who served as a Member of the European Parliament for the West Midlands from 2011 to 2020.

== Career ==
Born in London, the daughter of David Scott McIntyre and Joy Irma Stratford McIntyre, she was educated at the independent Claremont School, Esher, and Queen's College, London. As a business woman in Ross-on-Wye, she has been a partner in the Wythall Estate since 1976; in 1985 she became a consultant with MCP Management Consultants, then was a partner in the company from 1991 to 2011.

McIntyre stood unsuccessfully for parliament as a Conservative for Redditch in the 1997 general election and for Shrewsbury and Atcham in the 2001 general election. She was also unsuccessful as a Conservative candidate in the 2009 European election for the West Midlands constituency, but in December 2011 she was appointed to serve as a member for that constituency in the European Parliament without a new election. This was because the Lisbon Treaty had enlarged the European Parliament by eighteen, and one of these new seats came to the United Kingdom. Britain decided to allocate this to the West Midlands regional constituency, on the basis of population statistics. The results of the 2009 European elections were then considered to decide who would have won the additional seat if it had existed then. The result of this was that it was awarded to McIntyre.

She served on the European Parliament's Committee on Employment and Social Affairs and as a member of the Delegation for relations with South Africa.

McIntyre was appointed Commander of the Order of the British Empire (CBE) in the 2022 New Year Honours for political and public service.

== Personal life ==
Born in London, Anthea moved to her family estate in Herefordshire in the 1970's with her brother Jamie. In 1999 McIntyre married Frank Myers. She lives in Walford, Ross-on-Wye.
