= Michael Tappin =

British academic, author and politician

Mike Tappin
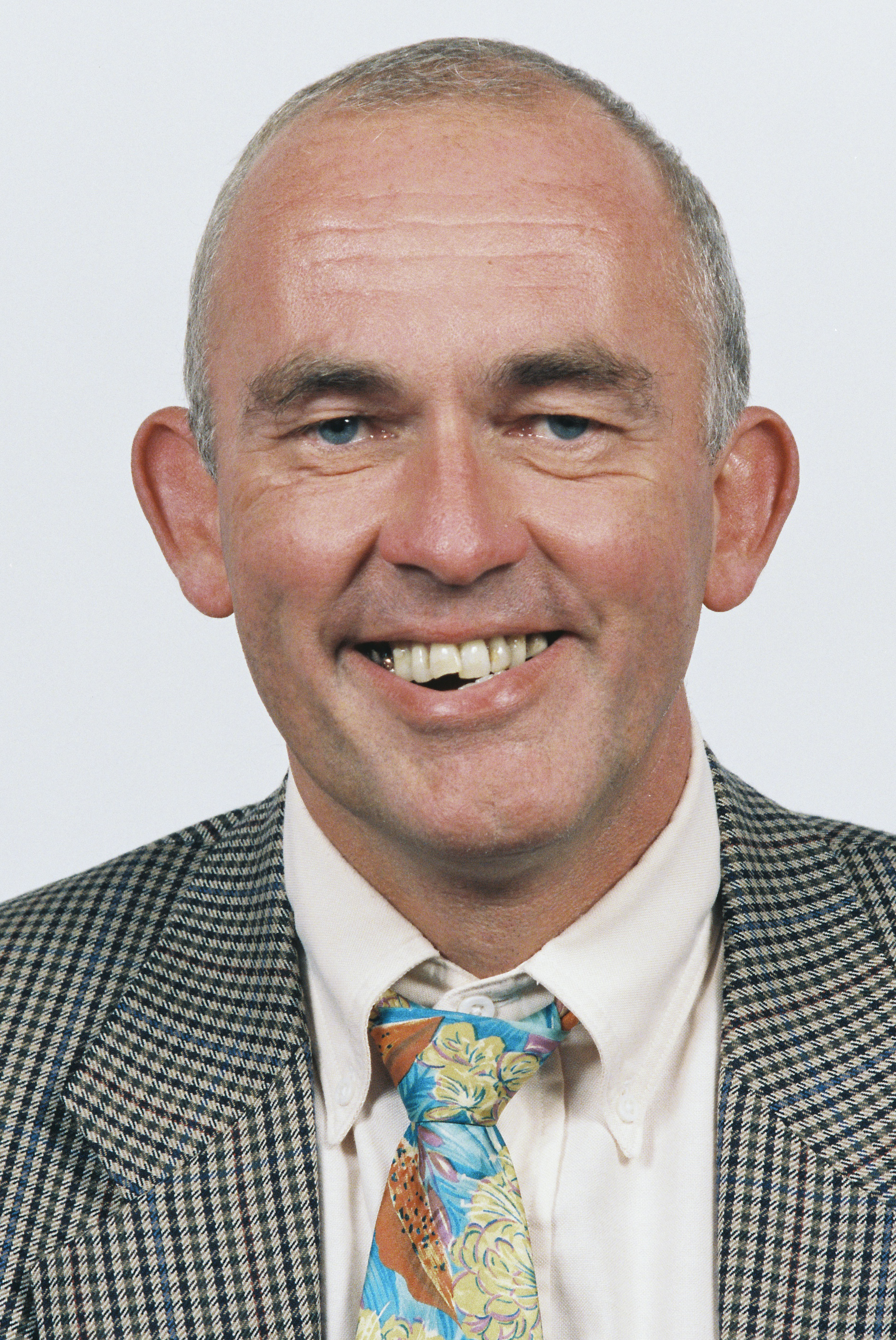
- Official MEP portrait

Member of the European Parliament for Staffordshire West & Congleton
- In office 1994–1999
- Preceded by: New Constituency
- Succeeded by: Constituency abolished
- Majority: 40,277

Personal details
- Born: Michael Tappin; 22 December 1946 (age 79)
- Party: Labour
- Education: University of Essex
- Occupation: Academic, author, politician

Michael Tappin (born 22 December 1946) is a British academic, author and politician.

== Education ==
Tappin graduated a Bachelor of Arts from the University of Essex, he has also been educated at Strathclyde University and the London School of Economics.

== Career ==
Tappin started lecturing at Keele University in 1974. He also worked in the field of politics across the world, being on the campaign team of US Senators. His particular specialization was in American politics.

Tappin was nominated as the Labour Party candidate in the 1994 European Parliament election for the seat of Staffordshire West and Congleton. He won the seat, defeating Conservative Party candidate Anthony Brown. The other two candidates for the seat represented Liberal Democrats, Green and Natural Law parties. Unusually, all parties claimed to be the 'opposition' in the seat - Labour and Lib Dems because of boundary changes, Conservatives because they were in a minority in the European Parliament. Mr Tappin was supported in his campaign by a talented team of young Labour members. The 'inner core' of this team, as one local councillor put it, made the John F. Kennedy campaign look like aged amateurs. He was given a five-year leave of absence from his duties at Keele University, as his important work in the EU saw him work on budget issues. Tappin lost his seat under the new list system in 1999.

Tappin continued his involvement in politics and won the Stoke-on-Trent Council seat for Blurton. In 2007, he became Leader of the Labour group on the Stoke-on-Trent City Council. One major decision under his watch was the sale of the Council's stake in the Britannia Stadium to Stoke City F.C. for £4.5 million. However, in the May 2008 local elections he lost his seat.

He retired from his post at Keele University in 2010, after 36 years at the institution.

== Bibliography ==
- American Politics Today (co-author)

=== Publications ===
- British Journal of Political Science
- Politics Today
