= Malcolm Harbour =

British politician (born 1947)

Malcolm Harbour CBE
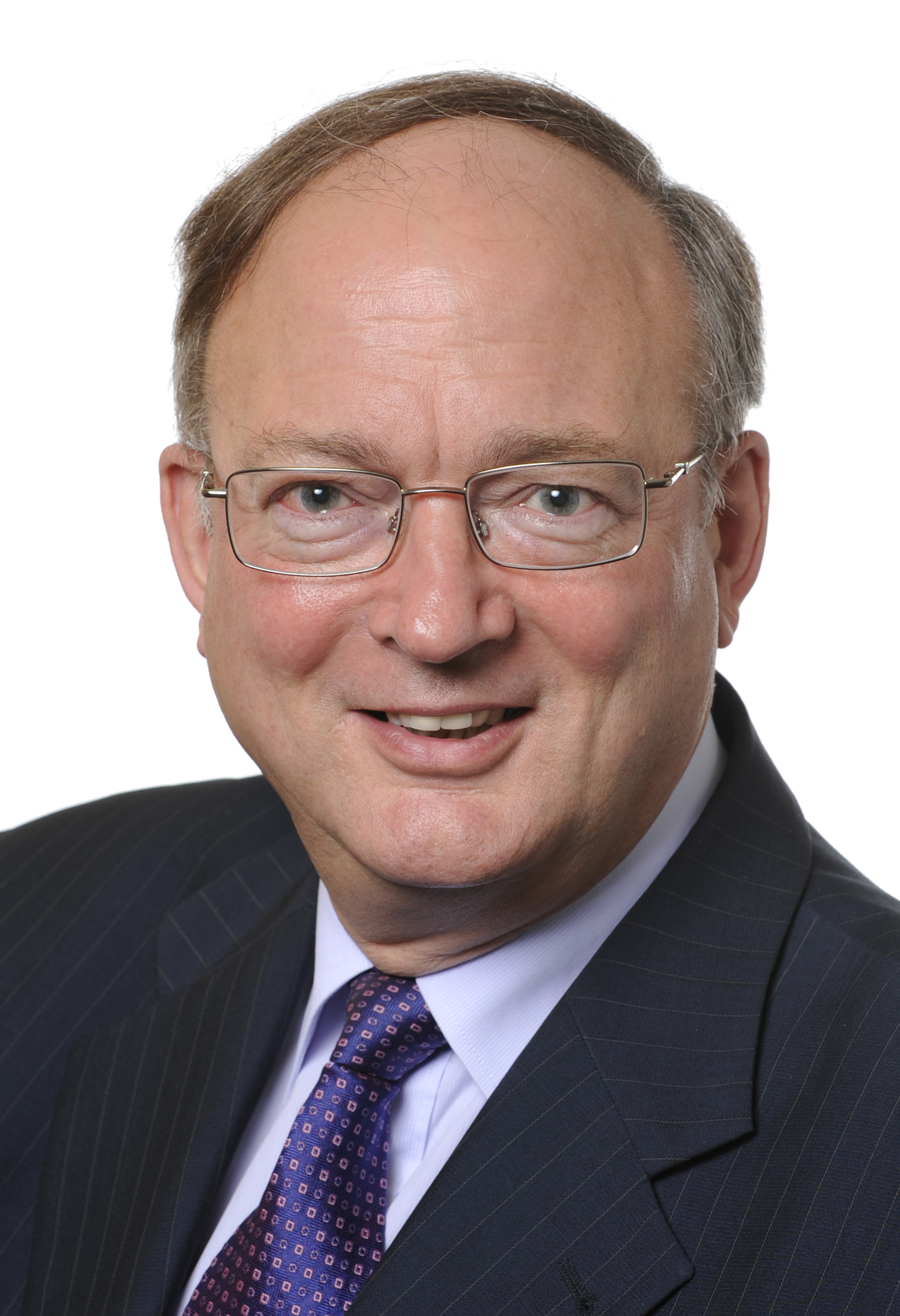

Member of the European Parliament for the West Midlands
- In office 10 June 1999 – 2 July 2014
- Preceded by: constituency established
- Succeeded by: Bill Etheridge

Personal details
- Born: 19 February 1947 (age 79) Woking, Surrey, England
- Party: Conservative
- Education: Trinity College, Cambridge; Aston University

Malcolm John Charles Harbour, CBE (born 19 February 1947), is a British Conservative Party politician who was a Member of the European Parliament (MEP) for the West Midlands between 1999 and July 2014. He was a member of the European Conservatives and Reformists Group and the chairman of the Committee on Internal Market and Consumer Protection.

== Education and qualifications ==
Harbour was educated at Bedford School (1960–64), Trinity College, Cambridge (1964–67) where he graduated in engineering, and at Aston University (1967–70) where he gained a diploma in management studies. In July 2008 he was awarded an honorary DSc by Aston University for services to science, technology and the European Union.

== Motor industry ==
Harbour spent 32 years in the motor industry, as an engineer, a senior commercial executive, a consultant and a researcher. In 1992 he became a founding director of the International Car Distribution Programme and in 1998 initiated the 3DayCar Programme, studying the reconfiguration of the automotive supply chain. He began his motor industry career in the BMC Longbridge Plant as an Austin Engineering apprentice in 1967. After working as a design and development engineer, he spent eight years planning and managing new product programmes in the Rover Triumph Division. In 1980 he became Strategic Planning Director for Austin Rover, in 1982 Marketing Director, in 1984 UK Sales Director and 1986 Overseas Sales Director. In 1989, he jointly founded the specialist consultants Harbour Wade Brown.

== European Parliament ==
Harbour became an active member of the Conservative Party in 1972. He first stood for the European Parliament in 1989 in the constituency of Birmingham East but failed to win election. He missed out again in 1994, before being placed high on the Conservative list for the new multi-member West Midlands region constituency in 1999, ensuring his election in the 1999 European Parliament election. He was re-elected in June 2004 and 2009. He was one of three Conservative members representing the West Midlands Region of the UK. He was chairman of the Committee on Internal Market and Consumer Protection and was a Member of the European Conservatives and Reformists Group. He was vice-chairman of the Parliament's Science and Technology Options Assessment Panel (STOA) and a Member of the Inter-Parliamentary Delegation to Japan. Harbour took a special interest in the EU Single Market, industry, science and technology policy. He was chairman of the European Manufacturing Forum, the Ceramics Industry Forum and the Conservative Technology Forum. He was a governor of the European Internet Foundation. He was the lead MEP (rapporteur) for major legislation on Telecoms, the Single Market and Motor Vehicle standards. He served on the CARS 21 High Level Group, a Europe-wide initiative to boost the automotive industry. He was named as a top 50 European of 2006 for his key role in broking agreement on the Services Directive. In May 2006, he was named the UK's most Small Business Friendly UK Parliamentarian by members of the Forum of Private Business. In September 2010, he was voted Internal Market MEP of the Year.

Harbour was appointed Commander of the Order of the British Empire (CBE) in the 2013 New Year Honours for services to the British economy.

== Personal life ==
Harbour married his wife, Penny, in 1969. He has two daughters, Louise and Katy, and four grandchildren. He lives in Solihull. His interests include travel, cooking, choral singing and motor racing.
