= Mike Nattrass =

British politician (born 1945)

Mike Nattrass FRICS
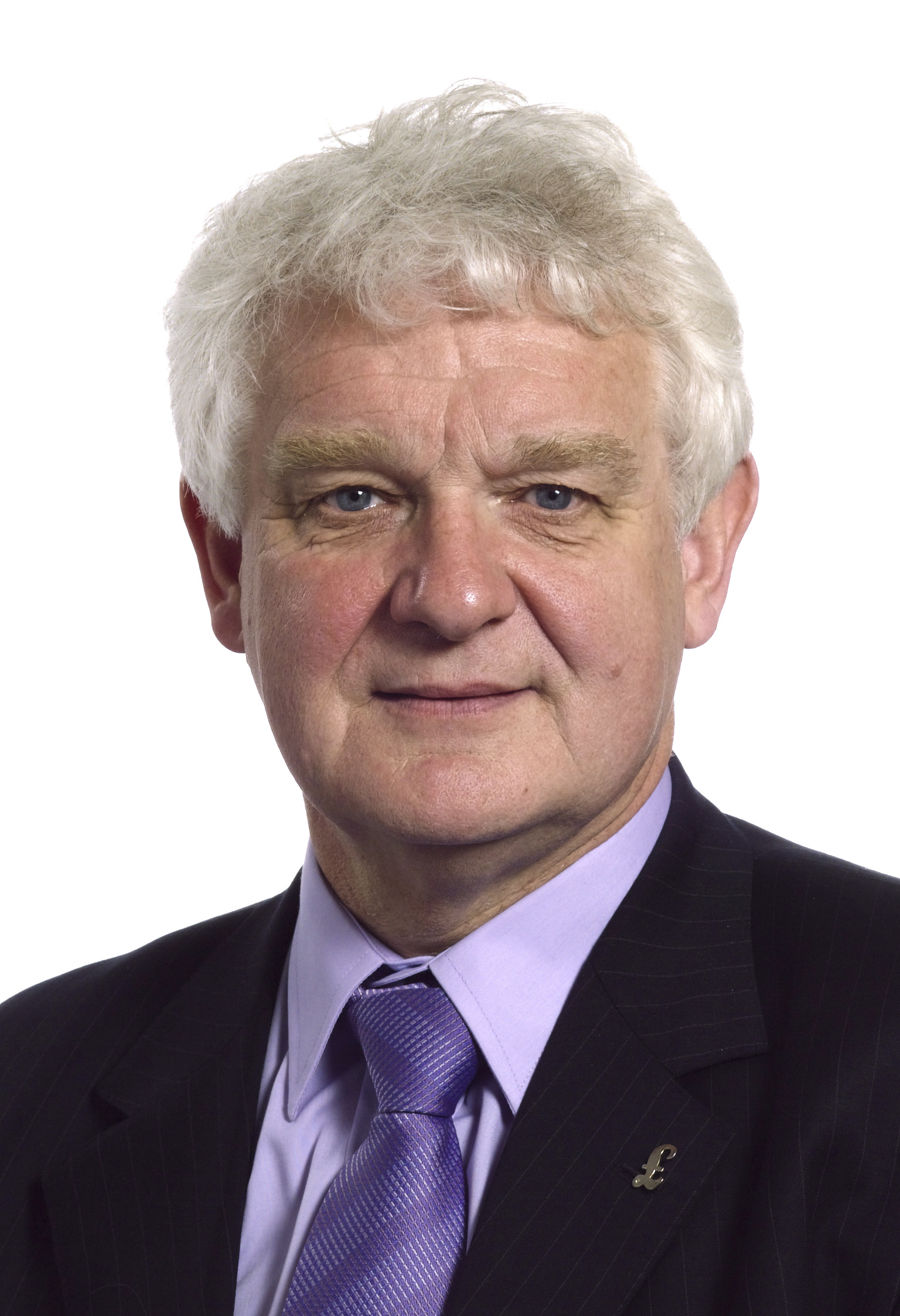

Leader of Independence from Europe
- In office October 2013 – 2 November 2017
- Preceded by: Party founded
- Succeeded by: Party abolished

Deputy Leader of the UK Independence Party
- In office 5 October 2002 – 27 September 2006
- Leader: Roger Knapman
- Preceded by: Graham Booth
- Succeeded by: David Campbell-Bannerman

Chair of the UK Independence Party
- In office 22 January 2000 – 5 October 2002
- Leader: Jeffrey Titford
- Preceded by: Nigel Farage
- Succeeded by: David Lott

Member of the European Parliament for the West Midlands
- In office 10 June 2004 – 2 July 2014
- Preceded by: John Corrie
- Succeeded by: Jill Seymour

Personal details
- Born: 14 December 1945 (age 80) Leeds, West Riding of Yorkshire, England
- Party: Independence from Europe (2013–2017)
- Other political affiliations: UK Independence Party (1998–2013)

Michael Henry Nattrass (born 14 December 1945) is a British politician who served as a Member of the European Parliament (MEP) for the West Midlands constituency, from 2004 to 2014. He was elected as a candidate for the UK Independence Party (UKIP) for the first time in June 2004 and re-elected in June 2009, but resigned from the party in September 2013. He lost his seat in the May 2014 election.

== Political career ==
In 1994, Nattrass joined the New Britain Party, whose candidates were absorbed into the Referendum Party in 1997. Standing in Solihull, he gained the highest vote in the West Midlands for the Referendum Party at the 1997 general election (4.7%). In 1998, he accepted an invitation to join UKIP from its leader Michael Holmes and sat on the UKIP National Executive Committee. In 2000 he became Party Chairman under Leader Jeffrey Titford and from 2002 to 2006 he was Deputy Leader under Roger Knapman.

Nattrass stood unsuccessfully in many parliamentary general elections and by-elections representing UKIP, including Sutton Coldfield in 2001 (finishing fourth of five with 2.7%), the May 2008 Crewe and Nantwich by-election (fourth of ten, with 2.2%), and South Staffordshire in 2010 (fourth of six with 5.5%).

He was elected to the European Parliament in 2004, one of 12 seats won by UKIP, with 16.1% of the vote. Nattrass was re-elected in West Midlands in June 2009.

Nattrass failed a candidate assessment test in August 2013 and was deselected by the party for the 2014 European election. He took the party to court over the decision, but lost. He said he was considering standing as an independent at the next election. He left UKIP in September 2013.

Nattrass was in talks with the English Democrats about the possibility of joining them, and agreed to speak at their September 2013 conference, but he chose not to after the party prematurely claimed he was joining them, citing concerns about elements in the party. In November 2013, Nattrass announced the creation of his new party, called An Independence Party. At the 2014 European election, the party stood as Independence from Europe but failed to win any seats.

Party political offices
Preceded by Nigel Farage	Chairman of the UK Independence Party; 2000–2002	Succeeded by David Lott
Preceded by Graham Booth	Deputy Leader of the UK Independence Party; 2002–2006	Succeeded by David Campbell-Bannerman
