= Results of the 2019 European Parliament election in the United Kingdom =

2019 election of members of the European parliament for the United Kingdom

The United Kingdom's component of the 2019 European Parliament election was held on Thursday 23 May 2019 and the local results were to be announced after 22:00 BST on Sunday 26 May 2019 when all the other EU countries had voted although the counting of votes started at 18:00 BST on that evening. The nine English regions and Wales announced their regional results overnight. Local results were also announced overnight in all Scottish council areas with the single exception of Na h-Eileanan Siar (Western Isles), which did not count their votes until the following morning due to local opposition to counting on the Sabbath. Thus the Scottish national declaration did not take place until around lunchtime on Monday 27 May. Northern Ireland also did not start to count their votes until the Monday morning as votes are by tradition not counted here on Sunday either, as a religious observance. Furthermore, due to the use of the single transferable vote (STV), it was expected that counting could take up to two days, but in the event it was completed on 27 May.

In the election there were a total of 373 voting areas across twelve regions, using the same regional boundaries as used in all previous European Parliamentary elections since 1999, under the provisions of the European Parliamentary Elections Act 2002, with votes counted at local authority level. In England the 317 local government districts were used as the voting areas; these consist of all unitary authorities, all metropolitan boroughs, all shire districts, the London boroughs, the City of London and the Isles of Scilly. The nine regions of England which make up the regional constituencies were then used to count the votes, with Gibraltar being regarded as part of South West England. Northern Ireland due to using a different form of Proportional representation than the rest of the UK was a single voting area and national constituency. In Scotland the 32 Scottish council areas were used as voting areas within its single national constituency whilst in Wales the 22 Welsh council areas were used as the voting areas within its single national constituency.

== Overview ==
Results of the 2019 European Parliament election in the United Kingdom
Party	Alliance	Votes			Seats		
Party	Alliance	Number	%	+/−	Seats	+/−	%
Brexit Party	NI	5,248,533	30.5	new party	29	new party	39.7
Liberal Democrats	ALDE	3,367,284	19.6	▲13.0	16	▲15	21.9
Labour Party	S&D	2,347,255	13.7	▼10.8	10	▼10	13.7
Green Party of England and Wales	G/EFA	1,881,306	11.0	▲4.0	7	▲4	9.6
Conservative Party	ECR	1,512,809	8.8	▼14.3	4	▼15	5.5
Scottish National Party	G/EFA	594,553	3.5	▲1.1	3	▲1	4.1
Plaid Cymru	G/EFA	163,928	1.0	▲0.3	1	Steady	1.4
Sinn Féin	GUE/NGL	126,951	0.7	▼0.2	1	Steady	1.4
Democratic Unionist Party	NI	124,991	0.7	▼0.1	1	Steady	1.4
Alliance Party of Northern Ireland	ALDE	105,928	0.6	▲0.3	1	▲1	1.4
Change UK	EPP (Note: Change UK's sole MEP before the election, Richard Ashworth, was a member of the EPP group.)	571,846	3.3	new party	0	new party	0
UK Independence Party	—N/a	554,463	3.2	▼23.4	0	▼24	0
Scottish Green Party	G/EFA	129,603	0.8	▲0.1	0	Steady	0
Social Democratic and Labour Party	S&D	78,589	0.5	▼0.0	0	Steady	0
Traditional Unionist Voice	NI	62,021	0.4	▼0.1	0	Steady	0
Ulster Unionist Party	ECR	53,052	0.3	▼0.2	0	▼1	0
Yorkshire Party	G/EFA	50,842	0.3	▲0.2	0	Steady	0
English Democrats	—N/a	39,938	0.2	▼0.6	0	Steady	0
UK European Union Party	—N/a	33,576	0.2	new party	0	new party	0
Animal Welfare Party	—N/a	25,232	0.2	▲0.0	0	Steady	0
Women's Equality Party	—N/a	23,766	0.1	new party	0	new party	0
Green Party in Northern Ireland	G/EFA	12,471	0.1	▲0.0	0	Steady	0
Independent Network	—N/a	7,641	<0.1	new party	0	Steady	0
Socialist Party of Great Britain	—N/a	3,505	<0.1	▲0.0	0	Steady	0
Independent	—N/a	80,280	0.5	▲0.5	0	Steady	0
Valid Votes	17,199,701	99.92			73	Steady	0
Rejected Votes	15,138	0.08					
Overall turnout	17,214,839	37.18	▲1.4				
Registered voters	46,550,683						

=== Results by regional constituency and local areas ===
Results by country/region (left) and by local authority areas (right). The Brexit Party won every region in England and Wales, except London, where the Liberal Democrats came top. The SNP was the largest party in Scotland and Sinn Féin in Northern Ireland. At the local authority level, the Brexit Party won most areas in England and Wales, and the SNP most in Scotland, with the Liberal Democrats, Labour, Plaid Cymru and the Green Party winning the remainder.

Constituency	Elected MEPs									
East Midlands	Brx	Brx	Brx	LD	Lab					
East of England	Brx	Brx	Brx	LD	LD	Grn	Con			
London	LD	LD	LD	Lab	Lab	Brx	Brx	Grn		
North East England	Brx	Brx	Lab							
North West England	Brx	Brx	Brx	Lab	Lab	LD	LD	Grn		
South East England	Brx	Brx	Brx	Brx	LD	LD	LD	Grn	Con	Lab
South West England	Brx	Brx	Brx	LD	LD	Grn				
West Midlands	Brx	Brx	Brx	Lab	LD	Grn	Con			
Yorkshire and the Humber	Brx	Brx	Brx	Lab	LD	Grn				
Scotland	SNP	SNP	SNP	Brx	LD	Con				
Wales	Brx	Brx	PC	Lab						
Northern Ireland	SF	APNI	DUP							

== England ==
=== East Midlands (5 seats) ===
Map showing highest polling party by counting area in the East Midlands electoral region.

European Election 2019: East Midlands
List	Candidates	Votes	Of total (%)	± from prev.
Brexit Party	Annunziata Rees-Mogg, Jonathan Bullock, Matthew Patten Tracy Knowles, Anna Bailey	452,321 (150,773.7)	38.23	+38.23
Liberal Democrats	William Newton Dunn Michael Mullaney, Lucy Care, Suzanna Austin, Caroline Kenyon	203,989	17.24	+11.82
Labour	Rory Palmer Leonie Mathers, Tony Tinley, Nicolle Ndiweni, Gary Godden	164,682	13.92	−11.01
Conservative	Emma McClarkin, Rupert Matthews, Tony Harper, Brendan Clarke-Smith, Thomas Randall	126,138	10.66	−15.33
Green	Kat Boettge, Gerhard Lohmann-Bond, Liam McClelland, Daniel Wimberley, Simon Tooke	124,630	10.53	+4.55
UKIP	Alan Graves, Marietta King, Anil Bhatti, Fran Loi, John Evans	58,198	4.92	−27.98
Change UK	Kate Godfrey, Joan Laplana, Narinder Sharma, Pankajkumar Gulab, Emma Manley	41,117	3.47	+3.47
Independent Network	Nick Byatt, Marianne Overton, Daniel Simpson, Pearl Clarke, Nikki Dillon	7,641	0.65	
Independent	Simon Rood	4,511	0.38	
Turnout		1,183,227	34.9	+1.7

The East Midlands electoral region is broken down into 40 local council areas.

District	Turnout	Brexit		Lib Dem		Labour		Green		Conservative		UKIP		Change UK		Others	
District	Turnout	#	%	#	%	#	%	#	%	#	%	#	%	#	%	#	%
Amber Valley	36.5%	14,246	40.0	5,419	15.2	4,344	12.2	4,276	12.0	4,001	11.2	1,911	5.4	1,100	3.1	276	0.8
Ashfield	30.5%	13,946	49.4	2,799	9.9	3,424	12.1	1,988	7.0	1,698	6.0	2,215	7.8	1,313	4.7	850	3.0
Bassetlaw	32.5%	12,977	47.1	3,168	11.5	4,127	15.0	2,007	7.3	2,301	8.4	1,973	7.2	760	2.8	236	0.9
Blaby	33.4%	10,312	41.5	4,117	16.6	2,352	9.5	2,728	11.0	3,192	12.8	1,128	4.5	850	3.4	192	0.8
Bolsover	26.9%	7,612	48.5	1,521	9.7	2,564	16.3	1,133	7.2	889	5.7	1,127	7.2	563	3.6	302	1.9
Boston	32.7%	7,544	56.1	1,049	7.8	933	6.9	717	5.3	1,757	13.1	996	7.4	296	2.2	158	1.2
Broxtowe	39.2%	11,668	35.6	6,802	20.8	3,927	12.0	4,385	13.4	2,883	8.8	1,307	4.0	1,542	4.7	244	0.7
Charnwood	33.3%	14,940	34.5	8,272	19.1	5,346	12.4	5,522	12.8	5,580	12.9	1,745	4.0	1,567	3.6	287	0.7
Chesterfield	32.2%	9,783	39.3	4,590	18.4	4,158	16.7	2,500	10.0	1,435	5.8	1,388	5.6	811	3.3	214	0.9
Corby	35.0%	6,299	40.2	1,829	11.7	3,620	23.1	1,196	7.6	1,147	7.3	836	5.3	594	3.8	142	0.9
Daventry	41.9%	10,339	39.5	5,382	20.5	1,508	5.8	2,933	11.2	3,609	13.8	1,049	4.0	1,174	4.5	206	0.8
Derby	31.8%	18,075	33.3	10,562	19.5	9,885	18.2	4,986	9.2	4,925	9.1	3,950	7.3	1,520	2.8	395	0.7
Derbyshire Dales	44.9%	8,669	34.0	6,192	24.3	1,694	6.6	3,791	14.9	3,165	12.4	936	3.7	915	3.6	148	0.6
East Lindsey	35.2%	20,454	53.8	4,208	11.1	2,372	6.2	2,509	6.6	4,520	11.9	2,543	6.7	938	2.5	478	1.3
East Northamptonshire	38.7%	10,958	41.3	5,328	20.1	1,784	6.7	2,624	9.9	3,510	13.2	1,235	4.7	881	3.3	204	0.8
Erewash	34.2%	11,834	40.3	4,622	15.7	3,666	12.5	3,043	10.4	3,540	12.1	1,491	5.1	921	3.1	244	0.8
Gedling	36.5%	11,788	37.0	5,518	17.3	4,799	15.1	3,998	12.6	2,807	8.8	1,518	4.8	1,166	3.7	257	0.8
Harborough	40.3%	9,848	35.6	6,681	24.2	1,550	5.6	3,329	12.0	4,083	14.8	944	3.4	1,023	3.7	177	0.6
High Peak	39.0%	8,946	31.9	6,058	21.6	3,981	14.2	4,616	16.4	2,310	8.2	1,089	3.9	911	3.2	164	0.6
Hinckley & Bosworth	34.1%	12,651	43.3	6,869	23.5	1,700	5.8	2,357	8.1	3,209	11.0	1,506	5.2	739	2.5	177	0.6
Kettering	37.5%	10,987	41.1	4,473	16.7	2,769	10.3	2,787	10.4	3,228	12.1	1,302	4.9	961	3.6	254	0.9
Leicester	32.6%	11,464	16.1	10,330	14.5	33,449	47.0	6,503	9.1	5,270	7.4	2,201	3.1	1,609	2.3	352	0.5
Lincoln	32.4%	7,343	38.0	3,339	17.3	3,002	15.3	2,443	12.6	1,586	8.2	875	4.5	525	2.7	202	1.0
Mansfield	28.8%	11,108	50.2	1,964	8.9	3,425	15.5	1,313	5.9	1,660	7.5	1,519	6.9	743	3.4	385	1.7
Melton	36.7%	5,962	42.2	2,412	17.1	758	5.4	1,860	13.2	1,817	12.9	660	4.7	519	3.7	151	1.1
Newark and Sherwood	36.6%	13,406	41.4	5,626	17.4	2,898	9.0	3,206	9.9	4,157	12.9	1,571	4.9	1,137	3.5	345	1.1
North East Derbyshire	33.6%	11,293	42.9	4,017	15.3	3,329	12.7	2,527	9.6	2,810	10.7	1,363	5.2	782	3.0	191	0.7
Northampton	36.9%	19,781	37.3	8,704	16.4	8,242	15.5	5,558	10.5	5,472	10.3	2,499	4.7	2,393	4.5	438	0.8
North Kesteven	34.4%	14,201	47.0	4,649	15.4	1,608	5.3	2,385	7.9	3,523	11.7	1,398	4.6	1,038	3.4	1,394	4.6
North West Leicestershire	32.7%	11,019	43.3	4,168	16.4	2,350	9.2	2,520	9.9	2,873	11.3	1,292	5.1	999	3.9	218	0.9
Nottingham	30.8%	15,798	25.8	9,448	15.4	18,194	29.7	8,714	14.2	3,650	6.0	2,770	4.5	2,182	3.6	475	0.8
Oadby and Wigston	33.6%	4,757	33.6	3,576	25.2	1,834	12.9	1,250	8.8	1,677	11.8	592	4.2	401	2.8	82	0.6
Rushcliffe	45.0%	10,503	27.2	10,580	27.3	3,270	8.5	6,024	15.6	5,085	13.1	1,056	2.7	1,851	4.8	315	0.8
Rutland	40.0%	4,176	36.1	2,892	25.0	487	4.2	1,499	13.0	1,581	13.7	377	3.3	424	3.7	121	1.0
South Derbyshire	31.7%	9,976	40.5	3,971	16.1	2,509	10.2	2,318	9.4	3,114	12.6	1,430	5.8	1,112	4.5	192	0.8
South Holland	32.1%	11,445	55.2	1,949	9.4	902	4.3	1,306	13.5	2,800	13.5	1,499	7.2	594	2.9	257	1.1
South Kesteven	36.6%	16,196	42.5	6,689	17.6	2,333	6.1	3,735	9.8	5,183	13.6	1,782	4.7	1,474	3.9	683	1.8
South Northamptonshire	42.8%	10,698	36.3	6,595	22.4	1,508	5.1	3,842	13.0	4,285	14.5	962	3.3	1,323	4.5	255	0.9
Wellingborough	36.2%	7,901	39.5	3,065	15.3	2,561	12.8	1,994	10.0	2,536	12.7	1,036	5.2	721	3.6	183	0.9
West Lindsey	34.7%	11,415	45.4	4,556	18.1	1,520	6.0	2,208	8.8	3,270	13.0	1,127	4.5	745	3.0	308	1.2

==== Best and worst results for each party ====
		Brexit		Liberal Democrat		Labour		Green		Conservative	
		Local authority	%	Local authority	%	Local authority	%	Local authority	%	Local authority	%
Best	1	Boston	56.1	Rushcliffe	27.3	Leicester	47.0	High Peak	16.4	Harborough	14.8
Best	2	South Holland	55.2	Oadby and Wigston	25.2	Nottingham	29.7	Rushcliffe	15.6	South Northamptonshire	14.5
Best	3	East Lindsey	53.8	Rutland	25.0	Corby	23.1	Derbyshire Dales	14.9	Daventry	13.8
Best	4	Mansfield	50.2	Derbyshire Dales	24.3	Derby	18.2	Nottingham	14.2	Rutland	13.7
Best	5	Ashfield	49.4	Harborough	24.2	Chesterfield	16.7	South Holland	13.5	South Kesteven	13.6
Best	6	Bolsover	48.5	Hinckley & Bosworth	23.5	Bolsover	16.3	Broxtowe	13.4	South Holland	13.5
Best	7	Bassetlaw	47.1	South Northamptonshire	22.4	Mansfield	15.5	Melton	13.2	East Northamptonshire	13.2
Best	8	North Kesteven	47.0	High Peak	21.6	Northampton	15.5	Rutland	13.0	Boston	13.1
Best	9	West Lindsey	45.4	Broxtowe	20.8	Lincoln	15.3	South Northamptonshire	13.0	Rushcliffe	13.1
Best	10	Hinckley & Bosworth	43.3	Daventry	20.5	Gedling	15.1	Charnwood	12.8	West Lindsey	13.0
Worst	1	Leicester	16.1	Boston	7.8	Rutland	4.2	Boston	5.3	Bolsover	5.7
Worst	2	Nottingham	25.8	Mansfield	8.9	South Holland	4.3	Mansfield	5.9	Chesterfield	5.8
Worst	3	Rushcliffe	27.2	South Holland	9.4	South Northamptonshire	5.1	East Lindsey	6.6	Ashfield	6.0
Worst	4	High Peak	31.9	Bolsover	9.7	North Kesteven	5.3	Ashfield	7.0	Nottingham	6.0
Worst	5	Derby	33.3	Ashfield	9.9	Melton	5.4	Bolsover	7.2	Corby	7.3
Worst	6	Oadby and Wigston	33.6	East Lindsey	11.1	Harborough	5.6	Bassetlaw	7.3	Leicester	7.4
Worst	7	Derbyshire Dales	34.0	Bassetlaw	11.5	Daventry	5.8	Corby	7.6	Mansfield	7.5
Worst	8	Charnwood	34.5	Corby	11.7	Hinckley & Bosworth	5.8	North Kesteven	7.9	High Peak	8.2
Worst	9	Broxtowe	35.6	Leicester	14.5	West Lindsey	6.0	Hinckley & Bosworth	8.1	Lincoln	8.2
Worst	10	Harborough	35.6	Amber Valley	15.2	South Kesteven	6.1	Oadby and Wigston	8.8	Bassetlaw	8.4

		Change UK		UKIP	
		Local authority	%	Local authority	%
Best	1	Rushcliffe	4.8	Ashfield	7.8
Best	2	Ashfield	4.7	Boston	7.4
Best	3	Broxtowe	4.7	Derby	7.3
Best	4	Daventry	4.5	Bassetlaw	7.2
Best	5	Northampton	4.5	Bolsover	7.2
Best	6	South Derbyshire	4.5	South Holland	7.2
Best	7	South Northamptonshire	4.5	Mansfield	6.9
Best	8	North West Leicestershire	3.9	East Lindsey	6.7
Best	9	South Kesteven	3.9	South Derbyshire	5.8
Best	10	Corby	3.8	Chesterfield	5.6
Worst	1	Boston	2.2	Rushcliffe	2.7
Worst	2	Leicester	2.3	Leicester	3.1
Worst	3	East Lindsey	2.5	Rutland	3.3
Worst	4	Hinckley & Bosworth	2.5	South Northamptonshire	3.3
Worst	5	Lincoln	2.7	Harborough	3.4
Worst	6	Bassetlaw	2.8	Derbyshire Dales	3.7
Worst	7	Derby	2.8	High Peak	3.9
Worst	8	Oadby and Wigston	2.8	Broxtowe	4.0
Worst	9	South Holland	2.9	Charnwood	4.0
Worst	10	North East Derbyshire	3.0	Daventry	4.0

=== East of England (7 seats) ===
Map showing highest polling party by counting area in the East of England electoral region.

European election 2019: East of England
List	Candidates	Votes	Of total (%)	± from prev.
Brexit Party	Richard Tice, Michael Heaver, June Mummery Paul Hearn, Priscilla Huby, Sean Lever, Edmund Fordham	604,715 (201,571.7)	37.83	
Liberal Democrats	Barbara Gibson, Lucy Nethsingha Fionna Tod, Stephen Robinson, Sandy Walkington, Marie Goldman, Jules Ewart	361,563 (180,781.5)	22.62	+15.76
Green	Catherine Rowett Rupert Read, Martin Schmierer, Fiona Radic, Paul Jeater, Pallavi Devulapalli, Jeremy Caddick	202,460	12.67	+4.20
Conservative	Geoffrey Van Orden John Flack, Joe Rich, Thomas McLaren, Joel Charles, Wazz Mughal, Thomas Smith	163,830	10.25	−18.12
Labour	Alex Mayer, Chris Vince, Sharon Taylor, Alvin Shum, Anna Smith, Adam Scott, Javeria Hussain	139,490	8.73	−8.53
Change UK	Emma Taylor, Neil Carmichael, Bhavna Joshi, Michelle de Vries, Amanda Gummer, Thomas Graham, Roger Casale	58,274	3.65	
UKIP	Stuart Agnew, Paul Oakley, Elizabeth Jones, William Ashpole, Alan Graves, John Wallace, John Whitby	54,676	3.42	−31.06
English Democrat	Robin Tilbrook, Charles Vickers, Bridget Vickers, Paul Wiffen	10,217	0.64	−0.41
Independent	Attila Csordas	3,230	0.20	
Turnout		1,598,455	36.5	

The East of England electoral region is broken down into 45 local council areas.

District	Turnout	Brexit		Lib Dem		Labour		Green		Conservative		UKIP		Change UK		Others	
District	Turnout	#	%	#	%	#	%	#	%	#	%	#	%	#	%	#	%
Babergh	39%	11,355	41.3	5,590	20.3	1,347	4.9	4,494	16.3	2,729	9.9	873	3.2	893	3.2	216	0.8
Basildon	31%	20,843	50.5	5,536	13.4	3,807	9.2	3,424	8.3	3,975	9.6	2,052	5.0	1,257	3.0	359	0.9
Bedford	36%	13,868	32.5	10,924	25.6	5,307	12.4	5,115	12.0	4,194	9.8	1,254	2.9	1,658	3.9	365	0.9
Braintree	33%	16,590	44.7	6,317	17.0	2,211	6.0	5,054	13.6	4,009	10.8	1,336	3.6	1,203	3.2	368	1.0
Breckland	35%	15,626	45.8	5,121	15.0	2,113	6.2	4,220	12.4	3,971	11.7	1,656	4.9	1,014	3.0	364	1.1
Brentwood	30%	9,486	43.2	5,219	23.8	1,002	4.6	2,115	9.6	2,582	11.8	668	3.0	695	3.2	170	0.8
Broadland	37%	14,662	39.4	8,733	23.5	2,375	6.4	4,797	12.9	3,874	10.4	1,361	3.7	1,168	3.1	269	0.7
Broxbourne	32%	9,890	44.7	3,186	14.4	2,528	11.4	1,837	8.3	2,884	13.0	843	3.8	748	3.4	207	0.9
Cambridge	48%	5,064	12.7	17,328	43.5	4,551	11.4	9,408	23.6	1,499	3.8	482	1.2	1,323	3.3	151	0.4
Castle Point	32%	12,821	58.7	2,123	9.7	1,237	5.7	1,517	6.9	2,122	9.7	1,194	5.5	662	3.0	183	0.8
Central Bedfordshire	36%	27,102	37.2	14,800	20.3	5,161	7.1	9,462	13.0	9,236	12.7	2,938	4.0	3,492	4.8	637	0.9
Chelmsford	37%	19,113	40.4	13,572	28.7	2,237	4.7	4,503	9.5	4,639	9.8	1,351	2.9	1,555	3.3	282	0.6
Colchester	35%	17,034	37.2	11,114	24.3	3,401	7.4	6,707	14.7	4,175	9.1	1,368	3.0	1,637	3.6	311	0.7
Dacorum	39%	13,427	31.8	13,120	31.1	3,049	7.2	5,134	12.2	4,651	11.0	1,127	2.7	1,435	3.4	281	0.7
East Cambridgeshire	38%	8,057	33.7	7,027	29.4	1,104	4.6	3,408	14.3	2,528	10.6	667	2.8	933	3.9	171	0.7
East Hertfordshire	40%	14,374	34.0	11,090	26.2	2,234	5.3	6,592	15.6	4,953	11.7	1,069	2.5	1,629	3.9	318	0.8
East Suffolk	40%	27,745	39.3	13,893	19.7	4,818	6.8	11,289	16.8	7,758	11.0	2,283	3.2	2,132	3.0	662	0.9
Epping Forest	36%	16,018	45.0	6,626	18.6	2,317	6.5	3,695	10.4	4,260	12.0	1,178	3.3	1,247	3.5	263	0.7
Fenland	31%	11,486	51.9	2,526	11.4	1,270	5.7	1,767	8.0	2,901	13.1	1,260	5.7	691	3.1	236	1.1
Great Yarmouth	31%	11,552	53.0	2,079	9.5	2,236	10.3	1,748	8.0	2,114	9.7	1,267	5.8	562	2.6	230	1.1
Harlow	30%	7,737	43.6	2,172	12.2	3,037	17.1	1,589	9.0	1,633	9.2	899	5.1	502	2.8	165	0.9
Hertsmere	36%	8,145	30.9	6,062	23.0	2,443	9.3	2,559	9.7	4,673	17.7	724	2.7	1,575	6.0	213	0.8
Huntingdonshire	38%	18,494	37.8	11,343	23.2	2,738	5.6	6,313	12.9	5,690	11.6	1,652	3.4	2,281	4.7	420	0.9
Ipswich	34%	11,367	36.7	5,383	17.4	5,095	16.4	4,164	13.4	2,669	8.6	1,208	3.9	825	2.7	269	0.9
King's Lynn and West Norfolk	34%	17,865	47.4	5,248	13.9	2,505	6.6	4,052	10.7	4,516	12.0	1,769	4.7	1,386	3.7	379	1.0
Luton	28%	10,026	28.1	5,030	14.1	12,878	36.1	2,659	7.4	2,499	7.0	1,197	3.4	1,120	3.1	283	0.8
Maldon	35%	8,436	47.2	3,132	17.5	745	4.2	2,061	11.5	1,945	10.9	692	3.9	699	3.9	165	0.9
Mid Suffolk	39%	12,417	40.5	5,924	19.3	1,384	4.5	5,565	18.2	3,320	10.8	1,009	3.3	803	2.6	234	0.8
North Hertfordshire	41%	10,719	26.8	12,595	31.5	3,261	8.2	6,149	15.4	4,324	10.8	924	2.3	1,640	4.1	368	0.9
North Norfolk	39%	13,400	41.7	8,966	27.9	1,236	3.8	3,279	10.2	2,866	8.9	1,325	4.1	760	2.4	320	1.0
Norwich	39%	7,820	21.3	8,800	24.0	6,239	17.0	9,529	26.0	1,915	5.2	949	2.6	1197	3.3	268	0.7
Peterborough	35%	16,196	38.3	6,491	15.4	7,272	17.2	4,563	10.8	4,594	10.9	1,537	3.6	1,277	3.0	349	0.8
Rochford	36%	12,396	52.8	3,276	13.9	1,083	4.6	2,478	10.5	2,201	9.4	985	4.2	773	3.3	298	1.3
South Cambridgeshire	48%	13,174	23.9	20,975	38.1	2,675	4.9	8,351	15.2	4,685	8.5	1,018	1.8	3,906	7.1	316	0.6
Southend-on-Sea	33%	18,032	42.1	8,085	18.9	4,255	9.9	5,214	12.2	3,849	9.0	1,582	3.7	1,465	3.4	390	0.9
South Norfolk	39%	14,288	35.3	9,495	23.5	2,305	5.7	6,547	16.2	4,774	11.8	1,255	3.1	1,421	3.5	359	0.9
St Albans	47%	10,590	21.5	22,232	45.0	2,752	5.6	6,010	12.2	4,583	9.3	717	1.5	2,235	4.5	239	0.5
Stevenage	35%	7,636	34.9	3,803	17.4	3,890	17.8	2,329	10.7	2,391	10.9	767	3.5	848	3.9	202	0.9
Tendring	36%	21,410	54.3	5,016	12.7	2,523	6.4	3,499	8.9	3,282	8.3	2,190	5.6	1,086	2.8	445	1.1
Three Rivers	38%	8,486	33.9	7,707	30.8	1,680	6.7	2,727	10.9	2,725	10.9	682	2.7	925	3.7	130	0.5
Thurrock	30%	17,573	51.7	2,909	8.6	5,080	15.0	2,159	6.4	2,623	7.7	1,947	5.7	1,093	3.2	587	1.7
Uttlesford	40%	10,137	37.8	7,645	28.5	890	3.3	3,460	12.9	2,838	10.6	577	2.2	1,066	4.0	198	0.7
Watford	36%	6,189	27.2	7,806	34.3	3,617	15.9	2,128	9.4	1,632	7.2	568	2.5	682	3.0	123	0.5
Welwyn Hatfield	38%	9,597	33.3	8,080	28.1	2,854	9.9	2,983	10.4	3,294	11.4	774	2.7	1,015	3.5	206	0.7
West Suffolk	36%	16,472	39.7	7,464	18.0	2,748	6.6	5,807	14.0	5,255	12.7	1,502	3.6	1,760	4.2	478	1.2

==== Best and worst results for each party ====
		Brexit		Liberal Democrat		Labour		Green		Conservative	
		Local authority	%	Local authority	%	Local authority	%	Local authority	%	Local authority	%
Best	1	Castle Point	58.7	St Albans	45.0	Luton	36.1	Norwich	26.0	Hertsmere	17.7
Best	2	Tendring	54.3	Cambridge	43.5	Stevenage	17.8	Cambridge	23.6	Fenland	13.1
Best	3	Great Yarmouth	53.0	South Cambridgeshire	38.1	Peterborough	17.2	Mid Suffolk	18.2	Broxbourne	13.0
Best	4	Rochford	52.8	Watford	34.3	Harlow	17.1	East Suffolk	16.8	Central Bedfordshire	12.7
Best	5	Fenland	51.9	North Hertfordshire	31.5	Norwich	17.0	Babergh	16.3	West Suffolk	12.7
Best	6	Thurrock	51.7	Dacorum	31.1	Ipswich	16.4	South Norfolk	16.2	Epping Forest	12.0
Best	7	Basildon	50.5	Three Rivers	30.8	Watford	15.9	East Hertfordshire	15.6	King's Lynn and West Norfolk	12.0
Best	8	King's Lynn and West Norfolk	47.4	East Cambridgeshire	29.4	Thurrock	15.0	North Hertfordshire	15.4	Brentwood	11.8
Best	9	Maldon	47.2	Chelmsford	28.7	Bedford	12.4	South Cambridgeshire	15.2	South Norfolk	11.8
Best	10	Breckland	45.8	Uttlesford	28.5	Broxbourne	11.4	Colchester	14.7	Breckland	11.7
Worst	1	Cambridge	12.7	Thurrock	8.6	Uttlesford	3.3	Thurrock	5.3	Cambridge	3.8
Worst	2	Norwich	21.3	Great Yarmouth	9.5	North Norfolk	3.8	Castle Point	6.9	Norwich	5.2
Worst	3	St Albans	21.5	Castle Point	9.7	Maldon	4.2	Luton	7.4	Luton	7.0
Worst	4	South Cambridgeshire	23.9	Fenland	11.4	Mid Suffolk	4.5	Fenland	8.0	Watford	7.2
Worst	5	North Hertfordshire	26.8	Harlow	12.2	Brentwood	4.6	Great Yarmouth	8.0	Thurrock	7.7
Worst	6	Watford	27.2	Tendring	12.7	East Cambridgeshire	4.6	Basildon	8.3	Tendring	8.3
Worst	7	Luton	28.1	Basildon	13.4	Rochford	4.6	Broxbourne	8.3	South Cambridgeshire	8.5
Worst	8	Hertsmere	30.9	King's Lynn and West Norfolk	13.9	Chelmsford	4.7	Tendring	8.9	Ipswich	8.6
Worst	9	Dacorum	31.8	Rochford	13.9	Babergh	4.9	Harlow	9.0	North Norfolk	8.9
Worst	10	Bedford	32.5	Luton	14.1	South Cambridgeshire	4.9	Watford	9.4	Southend-on-Sea	9.0

		Change UK		UKIP	
		Local authority	%	Local authority	%
Best	1	South Cambridgeshire	7.1	Great Yarmouth	5.8
Best	2	Hertsmere	6.0	Fenland	5.7
Best	3	Central Bedfordshire	4.8	Thurrock	5.7
Best	4	Huntingdonshire	4.7	Tendring	5.6
Best	5	St Albans	4.5	Castle Point	5.5
Best	6	West Suffolk	4.2	Harlow	5.1
Best	7	North Hertfordshire	4.1	Basildon	5.0
Best	8	Uttlesford	4.0	Breckland	4.9
Best	9	Bedford	3.9	King's Lynn and West Norfolk	4.7
Best	10	East Cambridgeshire	3.9	Rochford	4.2
Worst	1	North Norfolk	2.4	Cambridge	1.2
Worst	2	Great Yarmouth	2.6	St Albans	1.5
Worst	3	Mid Suffolk	2.6	South Cambridgeshire	1.8
Worst	4	Ipswich	2.7	Uttlesford	2.2
Worst	5	Harlow	2.8	North Hertfordshire	2.3
Worst	6	Tendring	2.8	East Hertfordshire	2.5
Worst	7	Basildon	3.0	Watford	2.5
Worst	8	Breckland	3.0	Norwich	2.6
Worst	9	Castle Point	3.0	Dacorum	2.7
Worst	10	East Suffolk	3.0	Hertsmere	2.7

=== London (8 seats) ===
Map showing highest polling party by counting area in the Greater London electoral region.

European election 2019: London
List	Candidates	Votes	Of total (%)	± from prev.
Liberal Democrats	Irina Von Wiese, Dinesh Dhamija, Luisa Manon Porritt Jonathan Fryer, Hussain Khan, Helen Cross, Graham Colley, Rabina Khan	608,725 (202,908.3)	27.2	+20.5
Labour	Claude Moraes, Seb Dance Katy Clark, Laura Parker, Murad Qureshi, Taranjit Kaur Chana, James Beckles, Sanchia Alasia	536,810 (268,405)	23.9	−12.8
Brexit Party	Benyamin Habib, Lance Graham Forman Graham Shore, Alka Cuthbert, Jimi Ogunnusi, Simon Marcus, Mehrtash A'zami, Aileen Quinton	400,257 (200,128.5)	17.9	
Green	Scott Ainslie Gulnar Hasnain, Shahrar Ali, Rachel Collinson, Eleanor Margolies, Remco van der Stoep, Kirsten De Keyser, Peter Underwood	278,957	12.5	+3.6
Conservative	Syed Kamall, Charles Tannock, Joy Morrissey, Tim Barnes, Scott Pattenden, Attic Rahman, Kirsty Finlayson, Luke Parker	177,964	7.8	−14.6
Change UK	Gavin Esler, Jacek Rostowski, Carole Tongue, Annabel Mullin, Karen Newman, Nora Mulready, Jessica Simor, Haseeb Ur-Rehman	117,635	5.25	
UKIP	Gerard Batten, Richard Braine, Peter Muswell, Freddy Vachha, Robert Stephenson, Peter McIlvenna, John Poynton, Ronie Johnson	46,497	2.1	−14.8
Animal Welfare	Vanessa Hudson, Jane Smith, Sam Morland, Ranjan Joshi, Mina Da Rui, Jonathan Homan, Simon Gouldman	25,232	1.13	+0.17
Women's Equality	Catherine Mayer, Bea Gare, Nanci Hogan, Aliyah Dunbar-Hussain, Hannah Barham-Brown, Alison Marshall, Olivia Vincenti, Leyla Mohan	23,766	1.06	
UKEU	Pierre Kirk, Richard Stevens, Saleyha Ahsan, Anna Novikova, Angela Antetomaso, Richard Boardman	18,806	0.84	
Independent	Claudia Mcdowell	1,036	0.05	
Independent	Daze Aghaji	1,018	0.05	
Independent	Roger Hallam	924	0.04	
Independent	Kofi Klu	869	0.04	
Independent	Andrea Venzon	731	0.03	
Independent	Mike Shad	707	0.03	
Independent	Zoe Lafferty	436	0.02	
Independent	Andrew Medhurst	430	0.02	
Independent	Alan Kirkby	401	0.02	
Independent	Ian Sowden	254	0.01	
Independent	Henry Muss	226	0.01	
Turnout		2,241,681	41.3%	

The Greater London electoral region is broken down into the 33 London Borough areas.

Borough	Turnout	Brexit		Lib Dem		Labour		Green		Conservative		UKIP		Change UK		Others	
Borough	%	#	%	#	%	#	%	#	%	#	%	#	%	#	%	#	%
Barking and Dagenham	31.6%	11,014	29.0	3,105	8.2	15,449	40.7	1,966	5.2	1,978	5.2	1,899	5.0	928	2.4	1,590	4.4
Barnet	42.5%	17,089	17.7	27,423	28.4	15,980	16.6	9,761	10.1	13,868	14.4	1,624	1.7	7,491	7.8	3,313	3.4
Bexley	37.7%	26,369	41.4	9,198	14.4	8,489	13.3	5,025	7.9	7,076	11.1	3,002	4.7	2,352	3.7	2,208	3.5
Brent	35.5%	8,014	11.5	16,141	23.1	25,565	36.6	6,398	9.2	7,037	10.1	1,337	4.1	2,859	4.1	2,543	3.6
Bromley	43.2%	31,292	31.1	26,912	26.8	8,629	8.6	11,835	11.8	11,051	11.0	2,585	2.6	5,031	5.0	3,132	3.1
Camden	44.8%	6,350	10.5	21,635	35.9	13,564	22.5	9,582	15.9	2,991	5.0	665	1.1	3,932	6.5	1,554	2.6
City of London	54.0%	504	15.7	1,298	40.5	348	10.9	464	14.5	196	6.1	38	1.2	253	7.9	100	3.1
Croydon	38.4%	20,728	21.6	21,289	22.2	22,375	23.3	10,629	11.1	10,139	10.6	2,480	2.6	4,636	4.8	3,801	4.0
Ealing	45.5%	12,858	13.0	25,876	26.1	31,881	32.1	10,519	10.6	7,416	7.5	1,744	1.8	4,961	5.0	3,928	4.0
Enfield	38.4%	14,650	19.4	15,716	20.8	22,843	30.3	7,764	10.3	6,501	8.6	1,785	2.4	3,487	4.6	2,645	3.5
Greenwich	40.1%	14,374	20.4	16,769	23.8	17,602	25.0	9,045	12.9	3,923	5.6	1,917	2.7	3,972	5.6	2,757	3.9
Hackney	41.7%	4,097	6.0	15,966	23.5	23,825	35.0	15,703	23.1	2,109	3.1	686	1.0	3,669	5.4	1,972	2.9
Hammersmith and Fulham	45.1%	7,123	14.1	17,344	34.3	9,906	19.6	5,839	11.5	4,558	9.0	784	1.5	3,297	6.5	1,755	3.5
Haringey	46.5%	5,487	7.5	22,865	31.4	22,158	30.4	13,433	18.4	2,307	3.2	726	1.0	3,863	5.3	2,013	2.8
Harrow	38.8%	12,004	18.5	14,116	21.8	16,312	25.2	5,187	8.0	9,814	15.1	1,388	2.1	3,128	4.8	2,902	4.5
Havering	37.2%	32,165	47.6	8,258	12.2	7,550	11.2	4,762	7.0	6,679	9.9	3,675	5.4	2,087	3.1	2,427	3.6
Hillingdon	37.6%	19,123	27.0	12,372	17.4	16,788	23.7	5,949	8.4	8,812	12.4	2,357	3.3	2,787	3.9	2,713	3.8
Hounslow	38.8%	11,981	18.3	15,095	23.1	19,759	30.2	5,862	9.0	5,644	8.6	1,664	2.5	2,965	4.5	2,492	3.8
Islington	47.7%	6,508	9.8	19,890	29.8	19,017	28.5	13,047	19.6	1,632	2.4	913	1.4	3,771	5.7	1,869	2.8
Kensington and Chelsea	41.0%	5,777	17.2	12,071	36.0	4,662	13.9	3,014	9.0	4,454	13.3	444	1.3	2,231	6.6	914	2.7
Kingston upon Thames	48.1%	10,197	19.2	25,006	47.2	4,005	7.6	4,892	9.2	4,176	7.9	1,035	2.0	2,165	4.1	1,551	2.9
Lambeth	42.0%	7,329	8.4	28,336	32.6	19,502	22.4	17,916	20.6	3,388	3.9	767	0.9	7,076	8.1	2,574	3.0
Lewisham	42.2%	9,117	11.9	21,581	28.1	19,965	26.0	15,444	20.1	2,641	3.4	1,099	1.4	4,514	5.9	2,564	3.3
Merton	44.5%	10,132	16.5	20,021	32.7	12,735	20.8	6,784	11.1	4,808	7.8	1,156	1.9	3,570	5.8	2,067	3.4
Newham	36.2%	7,730	11.8	9,192	14.1	33,379	51.0	5,353	8.2	3,756	5.7	1,336	2.0	2,234	3.4	2,441	3.7
Redbridge	37.8%	13,621	19.2	13,655	19.3	23,615	33.3	5,959	8.4	6,930	9.8	1,545	2.2	3,040	4.3	2,473	3.5
Richmond upon Thames	53.8%	11,699	16.1	38,000	52.3	3,404	4.7	7,802	10.7	5,727	7.9	872	1.2	3,403	4.7	1,684	2.3
Southwark	41.3%	9,072	10.9	27,128	32.5	20,569	24.7	15,286	18.3	2,853	3.4	1,158	1.4	4,908	5.9	2,376	2.9
Sutton	39.3%	17,307	30.4	18,706	32.8	5,563	9.8	4,663	8.2	4,863	8.5	1,845	3.2	2,062	3.6	1,935	3.4
Tower Hamlets	39.5%	6,823	10.1	16,883	25.0	25,602	37.9	9,432	14.0	2,525	3.7	1,011	1.5	3,350	5.0	1,856	2.8
Waltham Forest	41.3%	10,407	15.3	15,061	22.1	21,090	31.0	11,356	16.7	3,519	5.2	1,233	1.8	3,222	4.7	2,140	3.1
Wandsworth	47.0%	12,159	12.4	36,012	36.7	15,487	15.8	13,696	13.9	9,395	9.6	1,057	1.1	7,281	7.4	3,100	3.2
Westminster	40.6%	7,157	15.2	15,805	33.5	9,192	19.5	4,590	9.7	5,198	11.0	670	1.4	3,110	6.6	1,455	3.1

==== Best and worst results for each party ====
		Brexit		Liberal Democrat		Labour		Green		Conservative	
		Local authority	%	Local authority	%	Local authority	%	Local authority	%	Local authority	%
Best	1	Havering	47.6	Richmond upon Thames	52.3	Newham	51.0	Hackney	23.1	Harrow	15.1
Best	2	Bexley	41.4	Kingston upon Thames	47.2	Barking and Dagenham	40.7	Lambeth	20.6	Barnet	14.4
Best	3	Bromley	31.1	City of London	40.5	Tower Hamlets	37.9	Lewisham	20.1	Kensington and Chelsea	13.3
Best	4	Sutton	30.4	Wandsworth	36.7	Brent	36.6	Islington	19.6	Hillingdon	12.4
Best	5	Barking and Dagenham	29.0	Kensington and Chelsea	36.0	Hackney	35.0	Haringey	18.4	Bexley	11.1
Best	6	Hillingdon	27.0	Camden	35.9	Redbridge	33.3	Southwark	18.3	Bromley	11.0
Best	7	Croydon	21.6	Hammersmith and Fulham	34.3	Ealing	32.1	Waltham Forest	16.7	Westminster	11.0
Best	8	Greenwich	20.4	Westminster	33.5	Waltham Forest	31.0	Camden	15.9	Croydon	10.6
Best	9	Enfield	19.4	Sutton	32.8	Haringey	30.4	City of London	14.5	Brent	10.1
Best	10	Kingston upon Thames	19.2	Merton	32.7	Enfield	30.3	Tower Hamlets	14.0	Havering	9.9
Worst	1	Hackney	6.0	Barking and Dagenham	8.2	Richmond upon Thames	4.7	Barking and Dagenham	5.3	Islington	2.4
Worst	2	Haringey	7.5	Havering	12.2	Kingston upon Thames	7.6	Havering	7.0	Hackney	3.1
Worst	3	Lambeth	8.4	Newham	14.1	Bromley	8.6	Bexley	7.9	Haringey	3.2
Worst	4	Islington	9.8	Bexley	14.4	Sutton	9.8	Harrow	8.0	Lewisham	3.4
Worst	5	Tower Hamlets	10.1	Hillingdon	17.4	City of London	10.9	Newham	8.2	Southwark	3.4
Worst	6	Camden	10.5	Redbridge	19.3	Havering	11.2	Sutton	8.2	Tower Hamlets	3.7
Worst	7	Southwark	10.9	Enfield	20.8	Bexley	13.3	Hillingdon	8.4	Lambeth	3.9
Worst	8	Brent	11.5	Harrow	21.8	Kensington and Chelsea	13.9	Redbridge	8.4	Camden	5.0
Worst	9	Newham	11.8	Waltham Forest	22.1	Wandsworth	15.8	Hounslow	9.0	Barking and Dagenham	5.2
Worst	10	Lewisham	11.9	Croydon	22.2	Barnet	16.6	Kensington and Chelsea	9.0	Waltham Forest	5.2

		Change UK		UKIP	
		Local authority	%	Local authority	%
Best	1	Lambeth	8.1	Havering	5.4
Best	2	City of London	7.9	Barking and Dagenham	5.0
Best	3	Barnet	7.8	Bexley	4.7
Best	4	Wandsworth	7.4	Brent	4.1
Best	5	Kensington and Chelsea	6.6	Hillingdon	3.3
Best	6	Westminster	6.6	Sutton	3.2
Best	7	Camden	6.5	Greenwich	2.7
Best	8	Hammersmith and Fulham	6.5	Bromley	2.6
Best	9	Lewisham	5.9	Croydon	2.6
Best	10	Southwark	5.9	Hounslow	2.5
Worst	1	Barking and Dagenham	2.4	Lambeth	0.9
Worst	2	Havering	3.1	Hackney	1.0
Worst	3	Newham	3.4	Haringey	1.0
Worst	4	Sutton	3.6	Camden	1.1
Worst	5	Bexley	3.7	Wandsworth	1.1
Worst	6	Hillingdon	3.9	City of London	1.2
Worst	7	Brent	4.1	Richmond upon Thames	1.2
Worst	8	Kingston upon Thames	4.1	Kensington and Chelsea	1.3
Worst	9	Redbridge	4.3	Islington	1.4
Worst	10	Hounslow	4.5	Lewisham	1.4

=== North East England (3 seats) ===
Map showing highest polling party by counting area in the North East England electoral region.

European Election 2019: North East England
List	Candidates	Votes	Of total (%)	± from prev.
Brexit Party	Brian Monteith, John Tennant Richard Monaghan	240,056 (120,028)	38.7	+38.7
Labour	Jude Kirton-Darling Paul Brannen, Clare Penny-Evans	119,931	19.4	−17.1
Liberal Democrats	Fiona Hall, Julie Pörksen, Aidan King	104,330	16.8	+10.9
Green	Rachel Featherstone, Jonathan Elmer, Dawn Furness	49,905	8.1	+2.9
Conservative	Richard Lawrie, Chris Galley, Duncan Crute	42,395	6.8	−10.9
UKIP	Richard Elvin, Christopher Gallacher, Alan Breeze	38,269	6.2	−23.0
Change UK	Frances Weetman, Penny Hawley, Kathryn Heywood	24,968	4.0	+4.0
Turnout		623,478	32.7	

The North East England electoral region is broken down into 12 local council areas.

District	Voter turnout, of eligible	Brexit		Lib Dem		Labour		Green		Conservative		UKIP		Change UK		Others	
District	Voter turnout, of eligible	#	%	#	%	#	%	#	%	#	%	#	%	#	%	#	%
Darlington	31.7%	9,728	40.2	4,128	17.0	3,430	14.2	2,340	9.7	2,599	10.7	1,122	4.6	871	3.6	N/A	N/A
County Durham	32.9%	49,687	39.5	20,963	16.7	24,232	19.3	10,201	8.1	7,752	6.2	7,839	6.2	5,164	4.1	N/A	N/A
Gateshead	34.1%	17,837	36.9	8,546	17.7	11,311	23.4	3,895	8.1	2,323	4.8	2,831	5.9	1,619	3.3	N/A	N/A
Hartlepool	25.5%	9,446	52.7	1,729	9.7	2,465	13.8	980	5.5	910	5.1	1,586	8.9	793	4.4	N/A	N/A
Middlesbrough	25.6%	10,738	44.8	2,762	11.5	5,003	20.9	1,326	5.5	1,242	5.2	1,508	6.3	1,409	5.9	N/A	N/A
Newcastle upon Tyne	38.8%	18,328	27.2	16,149	23.9	16,582	24.6	6,629	9.8	3,633	5.4	3,395	5.0	2,746	4.1	N/A	N/A
North Tyneside	34.9%	17,944	33.8	9,798	18.5	11,696	22.0	4,546	8.6	4,030	7.6	2,865	5.4	2,220	4.2	N/A	N/A
Northumberland	34.0%	31,415	38.1	18,390	22.3	11,763	14.3	6,218	7.5	7,519	9.1	3,810	4.6	3,297	4.0	N/A	N/A
Redcar and Cleveland	29.7%	14,865	48.7	4,185	13.7	4,207	13.8	1,770	5.8	2,030	6.7	2,242	7.4	1,204	3.9	N/A	N/A
South Tyneside	31.9%	14,864	40.9	3,734	10.3	8,140	22.4	3,905	10.7	1,842	5.1	2,410	6.6	1,465	4.0	N/A	N/A
Stockton-on-Tees	31.8%	19,286	43.3	6,293	14.1	7,477	16.8	2,843	6.4	4,113	9.2	2,736	6.1	1,795	4.0	N/A	N/A
Sunderland	31.7%	25,918	39.8	7,653	11.7	13,625	20.9	5,252	8.1	4,402	6.8	5,925	9.1	2,385	3.7	N/A	N/A

==== Full results for each party ====
	Brexit		Liberal Democrat		Labour		Green		Conservative	
	Local authority	%	Local authority	%	Local authority	%	Local authority	%	Local authority	%
1	Hartlepool	52.7	Newcastle upon Tyne	23.9	Newcastle upon Tyne	24.6	South Tyneside	10.7	Darlington	10.7
2	Redcar and Cleveland	48.7	Northumberland	22.3	Gateshead	23.4	Newcastle upon Tyne	9.8	Stockton-on-Tees	9.2
3	Middlesbrough	44.8	North Tyneside	18.5	South Tyneside	22.4	Darlington	9.7	Northumberland	9.1
4	Stockton-on-Tees	43.3	Gateshead	17.7	North Tyneside	22.0	North Tyneside	8.6	North Tyneside	7.6
5	South Tyneside	40.9	Darlington	17.0	Middlesbrough	20.9	County Durham	8.1	Sunderland	6.8
6	Darlington	40.2	County Durham	16.7	Sunderland	20.9	Gateshead	8.1	Redcar and Cleveland	6.7
7	Sunderland	39.8	Stockton-on-Tees	14.1	County Durham	19.3	Sunderland	8.1	County Durham	6.2
8	County Durham	39.5	Redcar and Cleveland	13.7	Stockton-on-Tees	16.8	Northumberland	7.5	Newcastle upon Tyne	5.4
9	Northumberland	38.1	Sunderland	11.7	Northumberland	14.3	Stockton-on-Tees	6.4	Middlesbrough	5.2
10	Gateshead	36.9	Middlesbrough	11.5	Darlington	14.2	Redcar and Cleveland	5.8	Hartlepool	5.1
11	North Tyneside	33.8	South Tyneside	10.3	Hartlepool	13.8	Hartlepool	5.5	South Tyneside	5.1
12	Newcastle upon Tyne	27.2	Hartlepool	9.7	Redcar and Cleveland	13.8	Middlesbrough	5.5	Gateshead	4.8

	Change UK		UKIP	
	Local authority	%	Local authority	%
1	Middlesbrough	5.9	Sunderland	9.1
2	Hartlepool	4.4	Hartlepool	8.9
3	North Tyneside	4.2	Redcar and Cleveland	7.4
4	County Durham	4.1	South Tyneside	6.6
5	Newcastle upon Tyne	4.1	Middlesbrough	6.3
6	Northumberland	4.0	County Durham	6.2
7	South Tyneside	4.0	Stockton-on-Tees	6.1
8	Stockton-on-Tees	4.0	Gateshead	5.9
9	Redcar and Cleveland	3.9	North Tyneside	5.4
10	Sunderland	3.7	Newcastle upon Tyne	5.0
11	Darlington	3.6	Darlington	4.6
12	Gateshead	3.3	Northumberland	4.6

=== North West England (8 seats) ===
Map showing highest polling party by counting area in the North West England electoral region.

European Election 2019: North West England
List	Candidates	Votes	Of total (%)	± from prev.
Brexit Party	Claire Fox, Henrik Nielsen, David Bull Gary Harvey, Ajay Jagota, Elizabeth Babade, Sally Bate, John Banks	541,843 (180,614.3)	31.23	N/A
Labour	Theresa Griffin, Julie Ward Wajid Khan, Erica Lewis, David Brennan, Claire Cozler, Saf Ismail, Yvonne Tennant	380,193 (190,096.5)	21.91	−11.94
Liberal Democrats	Chris Davies, Jane Brophy Helen Foster-Grime, Anna Fryer, Sam Al-Hamdani, Rebecca Forrest, John Studholme, Frederick Van Mierlo	297,507 (148,753.5)	17.15	+11.14
Green	Gina Dowding Wendy Kay Olsen, Jessica Northey, Geraldine Coggins, Rosie Mills, Astrid Johnson, Daniel Jerrome, James Booth	216,581	12.48	+5.47
Conservative	Sajjad Karim, Kevin Beaty, Jane Howard, Arnold Saunders, Wendy Maisey, Thomas Lord, Anthony Pickles, Attika Choudhary	131,002	7.55	−12.51
UKIP	Adam Richardson, Jeff Armstrong, Fiona Mills, Nathan Ryding, Michael Felse, Ben Fryer, John Booker, Alexander Craig	62,464	3.60	−23.86
Change UK	Andrea Cooper, Dan Price, Arun Banerji, Michael Taylor, Philippa Olive, Victoria Desmond, Andrew Graystone, Elisabeth Knight	47,237	2.72	N/A
Independent	Tommy Robinson	38,908	2.24	N/A
English Democrat	Stephen Morris, Valerie Morris	10,045	0.58	−0.53
UKEU	Sophie Larroque	7,125	0.41	N/A
Independent	Mohammad Aslam	2,002	0.12	N/A
Turnout		1,734,907	33.1	

The North West England electoral region is broken down into 39 local council areas.

District	Voter turnout, of eligible	Brexit		Lib Dem		Labour		Green		Conservative		UKIP		Change UK		Others	
District	Voter turnout, of eligible	#	%	#	%	#	%	#	%	#	%	#	%	#	%	#	%
Allerdale	33.78%	9,599	38.5	4,229	17.0	3,205	12.9	2,766	11.1	2,363	9.5	991	4.0	969	3.9	789	3.2
Barrow-in-Furness	26.49%	5,573	40.4	1,656	12.0	2,482	18.0	1,205	8.7	1,233	8.9	691	5.0	349	2.5	621	4.5
Blackburn with Darwen	36.69%	9,488	25.9	3,189	8.7	16,180	44.1	2,283	6.2	2,330	6.4	1,149	3.1	569	1.6	1,460	4.0
Blackpool	30.17%	13,145	43.5	2,716	9.0	5,166	17.1	2,472	8.2	3,035	10.1	1,521	5.0	734	2.4	1,404	4.7
Bolton	34.38%	23,122	34.6	8,415	12.6	17,455	26.1	5,061	7.6	5,577	8.3	2,957	4.4	1,532	2.3	2,686	4.0
Burnley	33.13%	8,282	39.4	2,046	9.7	5,396	25.6	1,725	8.2	983	4.7	521	2.5	343	1.6	1,745	8.3
Bury	35.16%	15,390	31.4	7,936	16.2	10,419	21.2	5,558	11.3	4,722	9.6	1,704	3.5	1,563	3.2	1,754	3.6
Carlisle	33.85%	10,701	39.1	4,196	15.3	3,175	11.6	3,128	11.4	3,179	11.6	1,213	4.4	741	2.7	1,070	3.9
Cheshire East	36.14%	36,701	34.2	24,633	23.0	9,807	9.1	14,230	13.3	12,142	11.3	3,373	3.1	3,944	3.7	2,371	2.2
Cheshire West and Chester	34.94%	30,203	32.7	20,210	21.8	12,415	13.4	12,860	13.9	9,153	9.9	2,777	3.0	2,864	3.1	2,020	2.2
Chorley	36.09%	11,582	37.4	4,651	15.0	5,013	16.2	3,448	11.1	3,310	10.7	1,086	3.5	1,013	3.3	853	2.8
Copeland	31.07%	6,505	40.0	2,136	13.1	2,819	17.3	1,150	7.0	1,767	10.8	730	4.5	567	3.5	641	3.9
Eden	38.66%	5,684	35.3	3,706	23.0	880	5.5	2,596	16.1	2,002	12.4	474	2.9	400	2.5	366	2.3
Fylde	37.00%	9,401	41.8	3,786	16.8	1,594	7.1	2,522	11.2	2,945	13.1	774	3.4	828	3.7	651	2.9
Halton	27.12%	8,776	35.0	3,290	13.1	6,661	26.5	2,639	10.5	1,093	4.4	1,098	4.4	637	2.5	909	3.6
Hyndburn	31.41%	7,386	39.1	1,528	8.1	4,817	25.5	1,417	7.5	1,520	8.0	1,019	5.4	363	1.9	853	4.5
Knowsley	23.57%	6,975	25.7	2,401	8.9	10,847	40.0	3,708	13.7	520	1.9	836	3.1	673	2.5	1,150	4.2
Lancaster	35.96%	11,679	30.8	7,507	19.8	4,956	13.1	7,749	20.5	2,905	7.7	1,230	3.2	976	2.6	887	2.3
Liverpool	29.96%	17,351	18.4	15,776	16.7	38,048	40.3	14,481	15.3	1,922	2.0	2,103	2.2	2,263	2.4	2,506	2.6
Manchester	31.67%	15,069	13.9	21,041	19.5	40,191	37.2	19,966	18.5	3,423	3.2	2,626	2.4	2,381	2.2	3,428	3.2
Oldham	32.63%	15,791	30.4	6,144	11.8	17,512	33.8	4,041	7.8	2,550	4.9	2,400	4.6	998	1.9	2,442	4.7
Pendle	34.45%	7,609	34.4	2,325	10.5	5,765	26.1	1,629	7.4	2,786	12.6	896	4.1	353	1.6	742	3.4
Preston	35.15%	8,902	27.2	5,305	16.2	10,230	31.2	2,940	9.0	2,440	7.5	1,143	3.5	668	2.0	1,110	3.4
Ribble Valley	36.90%	6,759	39.7	3,398	19.9	1,096	6.4	2,174	12.8	2,214	13.0	548	3.2	450	2.6	398	2.3
Rochdale	30.44%	15,468	32.3	5,478	11.4	14,336	30.0	3,902	8.2	2,749	5.7	2,455	5.1	895	1.9	2,566	5.4
Rossendale	34.72%	6,585	37.3	2,317	13.1	2,876	16.3	2,196	12.4	1,695	9.6	761	4.3	490	2.8	742	4.2
Salford	30.09%	14,867	29.8	7,110	14.3	11,376	22.8	6,689	13.4	3,401	6.8	2,286	4.6	1,436	2.9	2,642	5.3
Sefton	31.19%	19,848	29.8	12,438	18.7	17,581	26.4	7,717	11.6	3,609	5.4	2,006	3.0	1,762	2.6	1,571	2.4
South Lakeland	45.04%	10,938	30.2	12,901	35.6	1,774	4.9	4,955	13.7	3,543	9.8	936	2.6	661	1.8	518	1.4
South Ribble	35.61%	11,789	39.8	4,899	16.6	4,025	13.6	2,922	9.9	3,096	10.5	1,150	3.9	863	2.9	840	2.8
St. Helens	28.59%	13,763	35.3	5,015	12.7	8,443	21.7	5,530	14.2	1,805	4.6	1,548	4.0	1,189	3.1	1,670	4.3
Stockport	36.46%	22,462	28.3	23,135	29.1	10,738	13.5	10,705	13.5	5,451	6.9	2,373	3.0	2,599	3.3	1,904	2.4
Tameside	28.42%	17,164	35.7	4,914	10.2	11,291	23.5	5,895	12.3	2,848	5.9	2,468	5.1	1,246	2.6	2,192	4.6
Trafford	40.40%	15,098	22.5	15,620	23.3	13,644	20.3	11,402	17.0	6,123	9.1	1,737	2.6	2,122	3.2	1,410	2.1
Warrington	35.57%	17,830	31.9	11,472	20.5	9,534	17.1	6,629	11.9	4,634	8.3	2,111	3.8	1,834	3.3	1,812	3.2
West Lancashire	34.79%	10,188	35.1	4,427	15.2	5,480	18.9	3,569	12.3	2,630	9.0	1,077	3.7	889	3.1	806	2.8
Wigan	27.92%	26,921	41.0	7,193	11.0	13,057	19.9	6,190	9.4	3,387	5.2	3,535	5.4	2,026	3.1	3,359	5.1
Wirral	34.29%	23,928	29.2	14,622	17.8	16,907	20.6	13,555	16.5	6,125	7.5	2,485	3.0	2,264	2.8	2,170	2.6
Wyre	34.73%	13,321	43.9	3,746	12.4	3,002	9.9	2,977	9.8	3,792	12.5	1,676	5.5	783	2.6	1,022	3.4

==== Best and worst results for each party ====
		Brexit		Liberal Democrat		Labour		Green		Conservative	
		Local authority	%	Local authority	%	Local authority	%	Local authority	%	Local authority	%
Best	1	Wyre	43.9	South Lakeland	35.6	Blackburn with Darwen	44.1	Lancaster	20.5	Fylde	13.1
Best	2	Blackpool	43.5	Stockport	29.1	Liverpool	40.3	Manchester	18.5	Ribble Valley	13.0
Best	3	Fylde	41.8	Trafford	23.3	Knowsley	40.0	Trafford	17.0	Pendle	12.6
Best	4	Wigan	41.0	Cheshire East	23.0	Manchester	37.2	Wirral	16.5	Wyre	12.5
Best	5	Barrow-in-Furness	40.4	Eden	23.0	Oldham	33.8	Eden	16.1	Eden	12.4
Best	6	Copeland	40.0	Cheshire West and Chester	21.8	Preston	31.2	Liverpool	15.3	Carlisle	11.6
Best	7	South Ribble	39.8	Warrington	20.5	Rochdale	30.0	St. Helens	14.2	Cheshire East	11.3
Best	8	Ribble Valley	39.7	Ribble Valley	19.9	Halton	26.5	Cheshire West and Chester	13.9	Copeland	10.8
Best	9	Burnley	39.4	Lancaster	19.8	Sefton	26.4	Knowsley	13.7	Chorley	10.7
Best	10	Carlisle	39.1	Manchester	19.5	Bolton	26.1	South Lakeland	13.7	South Ribble	10.5
Worst	1	Manchester	13.9	Hyndburn	8.1	South Lakeland	4.9	Blackburn with Darwen	6.2	Knowsley	1.9
Worst	2	Liverpool	18.4	Blackburn with Darwen	8.7	Eden	5.5	Copeland	7.0	Liverpool	2.0
Worst	3	Trafford	22.5	Knowsley	8.9	Ribble Valley	6.4	Pendle	7.4	Manchester	3.2
Worst	4	Knowsley	25.7	Blackpool	9.0	Fylde	7.1	Hyndburn	7.5	Halton	4.4
Worst	5	Blackburn with Darwen	25.9	Burnley	9.7	Cheshire East	9.1	Bolton	7.6	St. Helens	4.6
Worst	6	Preston	27.2	Tameside	10.2	Wyre	9.9	Oldham	7.8	Burnley	4.7
Worst	7	Stockport	28.3	Pendle	10.5	Carlisle	11.6	Blackpool	8.2	Oldham	4.9
Worst	8	Wirral	29.2	Wigan	11.0	Allerdale	12.9	Burnley	8.2	Wigan	5.2
Worst	9	Salford	29.8	Rochdale	11.4	Lancaster	13.1	Rochdale	8.2	Sefton	5.4
Worst	10	Sefton	29.8	Oldham	11.8	Cheshire West and Chester	13.4	Barrow-in-Furness	8.7	Rochdale	5.7

		Change UK		UKIP	
		Local authority	%	Local authority	%
Best	1	Allerdale	3.9	Wyre	5.5
Best	2	Cheshire East	3.7	Hyndburn	5.4
Best	3	Fylde	3.7	Wigan	5.4
Best	4	Copeland	3.5	Rochdale	5.1
Best	5	Chorley	3.3	Tameside	5.1
Best	6	Stockport	3.3	Barrow-in-Furness	5.0
Best	7	Warrington	3.3	Blackpool	5.0
Best	8	Bury	3.2	Oldham	4.6
Best	9	Trafford	3.2	Salford	4.6
Best	10	Cheshire West and Chester	3.1	Copeland	4.5
Worst	1	Blackburn with Darwen	1.6	Liverpool	2.2
Worst	2	Burnley	1.6	Manchester	2.4
Worst	3	Pendle	1.6	Burnley	2.5
Worst	4	South Lakeland	1.8	South Lakeland	2.6
Worst	5	Hyndburn	1.9	Trafford	2.6
Worst	6	Oldham	1.9	Eden	2.9
Worst	7	Rochdale	1.9	Cheshire West and Chester	3.0
Worst	8	Preston	2.0	Sefton	3.0
Worst	9	Manchester	2.2	Stockport	3.0
Worst	10	Bolton	2.3	Wirral	3.0

=== South East England (10 seats) ===
Map showing highest polling party by counting area in the South East England electoral region.

European Election 2019: South East England
List	Candidates	Votes	Of total (%)	± from prev.
Brexit Party	Nigel Farage, Alexandra Lesley Phillips, Robert Andrew Rowland, Belinda Claire De Camborne Lucy James Gilbert Bartholomew, Christopher Graham Ellis, John Kennedy, Matthew Peter Taylor, George Thomas Stahel Farmer, Peter David Wiltshire	915,686 (228,921.5)	36.07	
Liberal Democrats	Catherine Bearder, Antony James Hook, Judith Bunting Martin Paul Niebuhr Tod, Elizabeth Pendrill Raphael Leffman, Christopher Alan Bowers, Giles Damian Goodall, Ruvi Ziegler, Nicholas David Stanford Perry, John William Vincent	653,743 (217,914.3)	25.75	+17.8
Green	Alexandra Phillips Elise Danielle Benjamin, Vix Lowthion, Leslie Christine Groves Williams, Phelim Mac Cafferty, Jan Hendrik Jamison Doerfel, Larry Sanders, Isabella Lina Marie Moir, Oliver Sykes, Jonathan Christopher St.Aubyn Essex	343,249	13.52	+4.4
Conservative	Daniel Hannan Nirj Deva, Richard McDonald Robinson, Mike Whiting, Juliette Katherine Christie Ash, Anna Firth, Adrian Pepper, Clarence Mitchell, Neva Sadikoglu-Novaky, Caroline Anne Newton	260,277	10.25	−20.7
Labour	John Howarth Cathy Shutt, Arran Richard Neathey, Emma Christina Turnbull, Rohit K. Dasgupta, Amy Lauren Fowler, Duncan Shaw Thomas Enright, Lubna Aiysha Arshad, Simon Guy Burgess, Rachael Eowyn Ward	184,678	7.27	−7.4
Change UK	Richard Ashworth, Victoria Groulef, Warren Morgan, Eleanor Mary Fuller, Robin John Bextor, Nicholas Mazzei, Suzana Carp, Phil Murphy, Heather Marion Allen, Diane Helen Yeo	105,832	4.17	
UKIP	Piers Wauchope, Elizabeth Fletcher Philips, Daryll James Pitcher, Martin Toby Brothers, Tony Gould, Clive Keith Egan, Troy De Leon, Alan Harvey Stone, Judy Moore, Patricia Ann Mountain	56,487	2.22	−29.9
UKEU	Pacelli Ndikumana, Clinton Powe	7,645	0.30	
Independent	Jason Guy Spencer McMahon	3,650	0.14	
Socialist (GB)	Mandy Bruce, Raymond Dennis Carr, David Stanley Chesham, Robert Alexander Cox, Michael Foster, Stephen Harper, Neil Kirk, Anton Charles Pruden, Andrew Brian Thomas-Emans, Darren James Williams	3,505	0.14	
Independent	David Victor Round	2,606	0.10	
Independent	Michael Jeffrey Turberville	1,587	0.06	
Turnout		2,552,593	39.2	

The South East England electoral region is broken down into 67 local council areas.

District	Turnout	Brexit		Lib Dem		Labour		Green		Conservative		UKIP		Change UK		Others	
District	Turnout	#	%	#	%	#	%	#	%	#	%	#	%	#	%	#	%
Adur	39.6%	6,931	36.28%	3,744	19.6%	1,741	9.11%	3,306	17.3%	1,931	10.11%	473	2.48%	835	4.37%	144	0.75%
Arun	37.49%	21,827	48.68%	8,713	19.43%	2,035	4.54%	4,736	10.56%	4,357	9.72%	1,387	3.09%	1,441	3.21%	345	0.77%
Ashford	37.60%	15,741	45.54%	6,558	18.97%	2,144	6.2%	4,200	12.15%	3,436	9.94%	842	2.44%	1,400	4.05%	241	0.7%
Aylesbury Vale	41.6%	19,530	33.65%	15,395	26.52%	4,064	7%	8,122	13.99%	6,398	11.02%	1,266	2.18%	2,774	4.78%	494	0.85%
Basingstoke and Deane	37.45%	17,295	35.61%	12,336	25.4%	3,355	6.91%	5,693	11.72%	6,053	12.46%	1,161	2.39%	2,131	4.39%	542	1.12%
Bracknell Forest	35%	10,947	37.25%	6,983	23.76%	2,145	7.3%	3,346	11.39%	3,733	12.7%	706	2.4%	1,285	4.37%	242	0.82%
Brighton & Hove	46.83%	15,914	17.35%	20,337	22.17%	11,875	12.95%	32,594	35.53%	4,739	5.17%	944	1.03%	4,478	4.88%	530	0.58%
Canterbury	42.2%	16,695	37%	11,674	25.87%	3,835	8.5%	6,422	14.23%	3,557	7.88%	890	1.97%	1,807	4%	247	0.55%
Cherwell	40.15%	13,923	33.5%	11,193	26.93%	3,129	7.53%	5,524	13.29%	4,557	10.96%	988	2.38%	1,918	4.61%	332	0.8%
Chichester	41.2%	13,897	37.41%	10,144	27.31%	1,147	3.09%	5,187	13.96%	4,320	11.63%	782	2.11%	1,427	3.84%	244	0.66%
Chiltern	48.2%	10,319	30.03%	10,942	31.85%	1,496	4.35%	4,597	13.38%	4,381	12.75%	496	1.44%	1,881	5.47%	241	0.70%
Crawley	34.11%	9,493	37.69%	4,128	16.39%	4,728	18.77%	2,367	9.4%	2,721	10.8%	628	2.49%	887	3.52%	234	0.93%
Dartford	33.6%	11,592	46.23%	3,403	13.57%	3,247	12.95%	2,143	8.55%	2,678	10.68%	870	3.47%	944	3.76%	198	0.79%
Dover	38.62%	15,750	46.98%	5,629	16.79%	3,078	9.18%	3,821	11.4%	3,041	9.07%	772	2.3%	1,167	3.48%	265	0.79%
Eastbourne	38.7%	11,736	41.82%	7,474	26.63%	1,529	5.45%	3,168	11.29%	2,523	8.99%	658	2.34%	775	2.76%	203	0.72%
Eastleigh	%	13,922	38.82%	11,060	30.84%	1,572	4.38%	3,820	10.65%	3,024	8.43%	904	2.52%	1,308	3.65%	252	0.7%
East Hampshire	43.4%	14,330	36.14%	11,397	28.74%	1,204	3.04%	5,226	13.18%	4,881	12.31%	741	1.87%	1,583	3.99%	293	0.74%
Elmbridge	44.3%	11,648	27.58%	16,410	38.86%	1,553	3.68%	4,365	10.34%	5,130	12.15%	534	1.26%	2,251	5.33%	339	0.8%
Epsom and Ewell	41.2%	7,564	32.74%	7,481	32.38%	1,398	6.05%	2,611	11.3%	2,129	9.21%	372	1.61%	1,370	5.93%	180	0.78%
Fareham	%	15,900	43.29%	8,454	23.02%	1,442	3.93%	4,114	11.2%	4,238	11.54%	900	2.45%	1,366	3.72%	314	0.85%
Folkestone & Hythe	38.62%	15,674	48.35%	5,045	15.56%	1,933	5.96%	4,994	15.41%	2,589	7.99%	902	2.78%	1,031	3.18%	249	0.77%
Gosport	35%	10,666	50.44%	3,240	15.32%	1,236	5.84%	2,171	10.27%	2,247	10.63%	742	3.51%	667	3.15%	179	0.85%
Gravesham	35.1%	11,491	45.4%	3,228	12.75%	3,881	15.33%	2,234	8.83%	2,512	9.92%	913	3.61%	829	3.28%	224	0.88%
Guildford	44.21%	12,421	29%	15,412	35.98%	1,748	4.08%	5,581	13.03%	4,537	10.59%	563	1.31%	2,224	5.19%	351	0.82%
Hart	40.0%	10,032	34.94%	8,853	30.83%	811	2.82%	3,235	11.27%	3,564	12.41%	515	1.79%	1,474	5.13%	229	0.8%
Hastings	%	8,977	36.68%	4,415	18.04%	3,462	14.15%	4,480	18.31%	1,653	6.75%	587	2.4%	712	2.91%	187	0.76%
Havant	33.98%	15,166	47.19%	6,041	18.8%	1,521	4.73%	3,280	10.21%	3,730	11.61%	1,188	3.7%	959	2.98%	254	0.79%
Horsham	42.03%	16,072	35.62%	12,545	27.8%	1,654	3.67%	6,145	13.62%	5,298	11.74%	861	1.91%	2,224	4.93%	322	0.71%
Isle of Wight	38.3%	19,392	46.67%	6,557	15.78%	2,481	5.97%	6,855	16.5%	3,577	8.61%	1,292	3.11%	1,107	2.66%	290	0.7%
Lewes	44.32%	10,210	31.12%	9,144	27.87%	1,948	5.94%	6,707	20.44%	2,747	8.37%	560	1.71%	1,308	3.99%	188	0.57%
Maidstone	37.8%	20,475	45.98%	9,454	21.23%	2,437	5.47%	4,530	10.17%	4,697	10.55%	1,062	2.38%	1,580	3.55%	297	0.67%
Medway	%	30,861	48.29%	8,647	13.53%	7,472	11.69%	5,842	9.14%	6,219	9.73%	2,320	3.63%	2,009	3.14%	547	0.86%
Mid Sussex	40.9%	14,968	33.15%	13,709	30.36%	1,821	4.03%	6,456	14.3%	4,849	10.74%	719	1.59%	2,332	5.16%	303	0.67%
Milton Keynes	%	20,617	33.56%	14,996	24.41%	8,707	14.18%	6,802	11.07%	5,675	9.24%	1,626	2.65%	2,477	4.03%	525	0.85%
Mole Valley	46%	9,920	32.77%	11,055	36.51%	825	2.72%	3,275	10.82%	3,266	10.79%	556	1.84%	1,217	4.02%	162	0.54%
New Forest	38.7%	23,854	44.03%	12,153	22.43%	1,840	3.4%	6,305	11.64%	6,466	11.94%	1,351	2.49%	1,817	3.35%	385	0.71%
Oxford	47.6%	5,999	13.29%	18,190	40.30%	6,444	14.28%	10,239	22.68%	1,755	3.89%	511	1.13%	1,765	3.91%	238	0.53%
Portsmouth	33.5%	18,315	39.46%	10,601	22.84%	4,949	10.66%	5,869	12.64%	3,368	7.26%	1,503	3.24%	1,467	3.16%	344	0.74%
Reading	38.7%	9,034	22.35%	11,397	28.19%	6,788	16.79%	7,009	17.34%	3,208	7.94%	686	1.7%	1,930	4.77%	376	0.93%
Reigate and Banstead	%	14,653	35.63%	10,789	26.24%	2,158	5.25%	5,628	13.69%	4,772	11.6%	889	2.16%	1,922	4.67%	313	0.76%
Rother	41.37%	14,334	47.29%	6,069	20.02%	1,401	4.62%	3,510	11.58%	2,710	8.94%	844	2.78%	1,200	3.96%	245	0.81%
Runnymede	36.4%	7,880	37.41%	5,014	23.81%	1,332	6.32%	2,579	12.24%	2,492	11.83%	563	2.67%	1,007	4.78%	195	0.93%
Rushmoor	35.2%	8,302	37.45%	4,811	21.7%	2,309	10.42%	2,480	11.19%	2,460	11.1%	753	3.4%	829	3.74%	225	1.01%
Sevenoaks	41.1%	14,534	40.34%	9,135	25.35%	1,470	4.08%	3,996	11.09%	4,315	11.98%	673	1.87%	1,680	4.66%	229	0.64%
Slough	27.2%	5,954	25.17%	3,412	14.42%	8,917	37.69%	1,539	6.51%	2,148	9.08%	554	2.34%	816	3.45%	317	1.34%
Southampton	34.4%	17,683	32.84%	11,972	22.23%	8,200	15.23%	7,794	14.47%	4,280	7.95%	1,469	2.73%	2,006	3.73%	443	0.82%
South Bucks	40.4%	7,310	35%	5,340	25.57%	1,200	5.75%	2,163	10.36%	3,169	15.17%	372	1.78%	1,165	5.58%	166	0.79%
South Oxfordshire	43.34%	13,197	29.3%	15,233	33.83%	1,818	4.04%	6,807	15.12%	4,639	10.3%	763	1.69%	2,237	4.97%	340	0.75%
Spelthorne	37.8%	10,860	40.42%	5,913	22.01%	2,287	8.51%	2,842	10.58%	2,858	10.64%	849	3.16%	1,034	3.85%	224	0.83%
Surrey Heath	38.1%	9,492	38.31%	6,546	26.42%	1,109	4.48%	2,753	11.11%	3,174	12.81%	471	1.9%	1,014	4.09%	217	0.88%
Swale	33.9%	17,451	49.58%	5,911	16.79%	2,448	6.95%	3,761	10.68%	2,874	8.16%	1,264	3.59%	1,189	3.38%	303	0.86%
Tandridge	41.2%	10,090	38.68%	6,975	26.74%	1,007	3.86%	2,885	11.06%	3,004	11.52%	644	2.47%	1,290	4.95%	190	0.73%
Test Valley	40.3%	14,271	37.87%	10,337	27.43%	1,373	3.64%	4,299	11.41%	4,747	12.6%	818	2.17%	1,565	4.15%	275	0.73%
Thanet	36.11%	17,430	49.19%	5,034	14.21%	3,054	8.62%	4,323	12.2%	2,902	8.19%	1,356	3.83%	1,111	3.14%	221	0.62%
Tonbridge and Malling	38.9%	15,713	42.16%	8,264	22.17%	1,531	4.11%	4,810	12.91%	4,454	11.95%	756	2.03%	1,529	4.1%	212	0.57%
Tunbridge Wells	43.1%	11,370	32.96%	10,889	31.57%	1,520	4.41%	4,624	13.4%	3,507	10.17%	643	1.86%	1,725	5%	218	0.63%
Vale of White Horse	44.42%	11,976	27.97%	17,273	40.35%	1,628	3.8%	5,384	12.58%	3,900	9.11%	734	1.71%	1,660	3.88%	257	0.6%
Waverley	44.6%	11,599	28.76%	14,156	35.1%	1,009	2.5%	5,861	14.53%	4,636	11.5%	613	1.52%	2,093	5.19%	361	0.9%
Wealden	41.65%	21,321	42.23%	11,080	21.94%	1,681	3.33%	7,339	14.54%	5,593	11.08%	1,086	2.15%	2,047	4.05%	344	0.68%
West Berkshire	39.30%	15,830	33.99%	13,981	30.02%	1,632	3.5%	6,029	12.94%	5,974	12.83%	883	1.9%	1,948	4.18%	298	0.64%
West Oxfordshire	41.46%	10,501	31.25%	10,604	31.56%	1,812	5.39%	4,782	14.23%	3,683	10.96%	638	1.9%	1,355	4.03%	225	0.67%
Winchester	47.0%	12,157	29.14%	16,848	40.38%	1,041	2.5%	5,003	11.99%	4,275	10.25%	567	1.36%	1,622	3.89%	208	0.5%
Windsor and Maidenhead	39.6%	13,289	32.51%	12,769	31.23%	1,847	4.52%	4,554	11.14%	5,496	13.44%	580	1.42%	2,051	5.02%	296	0.72%
Woking	38.7%	7,682	28.35%	9,797	36.15%	1,644	6.07%	2,843	10.49%	3,075	11.35%	507	1.87%	1,339	4.94%	214	0.79%
Wokingham	41.7%	14,728	29.05%	17,379	34.28%	2,689	5.3%	5,807	11.45%	6,330	12.49%	759	1.5%	2,650	5.23%	353	0.7%
Worthing	38.1%	11,329	36.3%	6,742	21.6%	2,993	9.59%	4,866	15.59%	3,005	9.63%	726	2.33%	1,330	4.26%	215	0.69%
Wycombe	39.96%	15,652	31.26%	13,333	26.62%	4,893	9.77%	6,617	13.21%	6,021	12.02%	942	1.88%	2,261	4.51%	359	0.72%

==== Best and worst results for each party ====
		Brexit		Liberal Democrat		Labour		Green		Conservative	
		Local authority	%	Local authority	%	Local authority	%	Local authority	%	Local authority	%
Best	1	Gosport	50.44	Winchester	40.38	Slough	37.69	Brighton & Hove	35.53	South Bucks	15.17
Best	2	Swale	49.58	Vale of White Horse	40.35	Crawley	18.77	Oxford	22.68	Windsor and Maidenhead	13.44
Best	3	Thanet	49.19	Oxford	40.3	Reading	16.79	Lewes	20.44	West Berkshire	12.83
Best	4	Arun	48.68	Elmbridge	38.86	Gravesham	15.33	Hastings	18.31	Surrey Heath	12.81
Best	5	Folkestone & Hythe	48.35	Mole Valley	36.51	Southampton	15.23	Reading	17.34	Chiltern	12.75
Best	6	Medway	48.29	Woking	36.15	Oxford	14.28	Adur	17.3	Bracknell Forest	12.7
Best	7	Rother	47.29	Guildford	35.98	Milton Keynes	14.18	Isle of Wight	16.5	Test Valley	12.6
Best	8	Havant	47.19	Waverley	35.1	Hastings	14.15	Worthing	15.59	Wokingham	12.49
Best	9	Dover	46.98	Wokingham	34.28	Brighton & Hove	12.95	Folkestone & Hythe	15.41	Basingstoke and Deane	12.46
Best	10	Isle of Wight	46.67	South Oxfordshire	33.83	Dartford	12.95	South Oxfordshire	15.12	Hart	12.41
Worst	1	Oxford	13.29	Gravesham	12.75	Winchester	2.5	Slough	6.51	Oxford	3.89
Worst	2	Brighton & Hove	17.35	Medway	13.53	Waverley	2.5	Dartford	8.55	Brighton & Hove	5.17
Worst	3	Reading	22.35	Dartford	13.57	Mole Valley	2.72	Gravesham	8.83	Hastings	6.75
Worst	4	Slough	25.17	Thanet	14.21	Hart	2.82	Medway	9.14	Portsmouth	7.26
Worst	5	Elmbridge	27.58	Slough	14.42	East Hampshire	3.04	Crawley	9.4	Canterbury	7.88
Worst	6	Vale of White Horse	27.97	Gosport	15.32	Chichester	3.09	Maidstone	10.17	Reading	7.94
Worst	7	Woking	28.35	Folkestone & Hythe	15.56	Wealden	3.33	Havant	10.21	Southampton	7.95
Worst	8	Waverley	28.76	Isle of Wight	15.78	New Forest	3.4	Gosport	10.27	Folkestone & Hythe	7.99
Worst	9	Guildford	29.0	Crawley	16.39	West Berkshire	3.5	Elmbridge	10.34	Swale	8.16
Worst	10	Wokingham	29.05	Dover	16.79	Test Valley	3.64	South Bucks	10.36	Thanet	8.19

		Change UK		UKIP	
		Local authority	%	Local authority	%
Best	1	Epsom and Ewell	5.93	Thanet	3.83
Best	2	South Bucks	5.58	Havant	3.7
Best	3	Chiltern	5.47	Medway	3.63
Best	4	Elmbridge	5.33	Gravesham	3.61
Best	5	Wokingham	5.23	Swale	3.59
Best	6	Guildford	5.19	Gosport	3.51
Best	7	Waverley	5.19	Dartford	3.47
Best	8	Mid Sussex	5.16	Rushmoor	3.4
Best	9	Hart	5.13	Portsmouth	3.24
Best	10	Windsor and Maidenhead	5.02	Spelthorne	3.16
Worst	1	Isle of Wight	2.66	Brighton & Hove	1.03
Worst	2	Eastbourne	2.76	Oxford	1.13
Worst	3	Hastings	2.91	Elmbridge	1.26
Worst	4	Havant	2.98	Guildford	1.31
Worst	5	Medway	3.14	Winchester	1.36
Worst	6	Thanet	3.14	Windsor and Maidenhead	1.42
Worst	7	Gosport	3.15	Chiltern	1.44
Worst	8	Portsmouth	3.16	Wokingham	1.5
Worst	9	Folkestone & Hythe	3.18	Waverley	1.52
Worst	10	Arun	3.21	Mid Sussex	1.59

=== South West England (6 seats) ===
Map showing highest polling party by counting area in the South West England electoral region.

European Election 2019: South West England
List	Candidates	Votes	Of total (%)	± from prev.
Brexit Party	Ann Widdecombe, James Glancy, Christina Jordan Ann Tarr, Roger Lane-Nott, Nicola Darke	611,742 (203,914)	36.71	
Liberal Democrats	Caroline Voaden, Martin Horwood Stephen Williams, Eleanor Rylance, David Chalmers, Luke Stagnetto	385,095 (192,547.5)	23.11	+12.41
Green	Molly Scott Cato Cleo Lake, Carla Denyer, Tom Scott, Martin Dimery, Karen La Borde	302,364	18.14	+7.04
Conservative	Ashley Fox, James Mustoe, Faye Purbrick, Claire Hiscott, James Taghdissian, Emmline Owens	144,674	8.68	−20.21
Labour	Clare Moody, Andrew Adonis, Jayne Kirkham, Neil Guild, Yvonne Atkinson, Sadik Al-Hassan	108,100	6.49	−7.26
UKIP	Lawrence Webb, Carl Benjamin, Anthony McIntyre, Lester Taylor, Stephen Lee, Alison Sheridan	53,739	3.22	−29.07
Change UK	Rachel Johnson, Jim Godfrey, Oliver Middleton, Matthew Hooberman, Elizabeth-Anne Sewell, Crispin Hunt	46,612	2.80	
English Democrat	Jenny Knight, Michael Blundell	8,393	0.50	−0.50
Independent	Larch Maxey	1,772	0.11	
Independent	Mothiur Rahman	755	0.05	
Independent	Neville Seed	3,383	0.20	
Turnout		1,678,619	40.5%	+3.5

The South West England electoral region is broken down into 30 local council areas and Gibraltar.

District	Voter turnout, of eligible	Brexit		Lib Dem		Labour		Green		Conservative		UKIP		Change UK		Others	
District	Voter turnout, of eligible	#	%	#	%	#	%	#	%	#	%	#	%	#	%	#	%
Bath and North East Somerset	44.4%	15,738	26.5%	20,787	35.0%	3,182	5.4%	12,230	20.6%	4,030	6.8%	1,367	2.3%	1,699	2.9%	380	0.64%
Bournemouth, Christchurch and Poole	35.9%	42,179	41.8%	21,389	21.2%	5,591	5.5%	15,205	15.1%	8,555	8.5%	3,863	3.8%	3,244	3.2%	901	0.89%
Bristol	44.6%	26,071	18.6%	31,510	22.5%	19,431	13.9%	49,126	35.1%	6,623	4.7%	3,196	2.3%	3,258	2.3%	825	0.59%
Cheltenham	43.3%	10,099	27.0%	13,631	36.5%	1,642	4.4%	6,332	16.9%	3,521	9.4%	769	2.1%	1,127	3.0%	254	0.68%
Cornwall	41.4%	71,681	41.1%	34,845	20.0%	10,782	6.2%	31,544	18.1%	13,486	7.7%	6,209	3.6%	4,191	2.4%	1,682	0.96%
Cotswold	43.2%	10,275	34.3%	9,067	30.2%	851	2.8%	4,217	14.1%	3,741	12.5%	715	2.4%	922	3.1%	211	0.70%
Dorset	41.1%	50,163	41.9%	26,789	22.4%	4,728	4.0%	17,843	14.9%	12,076	10.1%	4,253	3.6%	2,946	2.5%	896	0.75%
East Devon	40.7%	19,603	41.4%	9,607	20.3%	1,644	3.5%	8,508	18.0%	4,243	9.0%	1,513	3.2%	1,578	3.3%	620	1.31%
Exeter	40.5%	10,042	28.1%	7,236	20.2%	4,395	12.3%	9,742	27.2%	2,109	5.9%	954	2.7%	1,090	3.0%	211	0.59%
Forest of Dean	37.9%	10,553	41.8%	4,255	16.8%	1,833	7.3%	4,489	17.8%	2,309	9.1%	900	3.6%	684	2.7%	252	1.00%
Gloucester	35.3%	11,463	38.6%	5,769	19.4%	3,545	11.9%	3,748	12.6%	2,994	10.1%	1,118	3.8%	791	2.7%	304	1.02%
Isles of Scilly	55.4%	238	27.8%	206	24.1%	49	5.7%	212	24.8%	90	10.5%	20	2.3%	31	3.6%	10	1.17%
Mendip	42.4%	12,083	33.0%	9,499	25.9%	1,470	4.0%	8,347	22.8%	3,092	8.4%	991	2.7%	866	2.4%	273	0.75%
Mid Devon	40.0%	9,572	38.7%	5,213	21.1%	1,050	4.2%	4,731	19.1%	2,327	9.4%	888	3.6%	698	2.8%	241	0.97%
North Devon	38.1%	12,077	42.7%	6,587	23.3%	1,101	3.9%	4,261	15.1%	2,408	8.5%	1,046	3.7%	563	2.0%	266	0.94%
North Somerset	38.5%	23,388	37.8%	14,853	24.0%	3,080	5.0%	10,812	17.5%	5,036	8.1%	1,891	3.1%	2,148	3.5%	605	0.98%
Plymouth	34.9%	28,289	42.8%	9,303	14.1%	8,101	12.3%	9,064	13.7%	5,674	8.6%	3,071	4.7%	1,915	2.9%	620	0.94%
Sedgemoor	35.4%	14,314	45.1%	6,469	20.4%	1,692	5.3%	3,807	12.0%	3,219	10.2%	1,254	4.0%	701	2.2%	249	0.79%
Somerset West and Taunton	41.8%	18,822	40.3%	12,084	25.9%	1,790	3.8%	6,535	14.0%	4,187	9.0%	1,547	3.3%	1,296	2.8%	450	0.96%
South Gloucestershire	37.5%	27,839	36.8%	18,245	24.1%	5,462	7.2%	11,149	14.7%	7,633	10.1%	2,481	3.3%	2,176	2.9%	627	0.83%
South Hams	46.8%	11,278	35.6%	7,595	24.0%	1,218	3.8%	6,867	21.7%	2,808	8.9%	694	2.2%	1,032	3.3%	217	0.68%
South Somerset	40.8%	21,712	42.6%	13,006	25.5%	1,608	3.2%	6,636	13.0%	4,633	9.1%	1,740	3.4%	1,209	2.4%	467	0.92%
Stroud	46.3%	12,501	29.2%	9,134	21.3%	2,863	6.7%	12,143	28.3%	3,741	8.7%	1,003	2.3%	1,206	2.8%	290	0.68%
Swindon	35.7%	19,126	35.7%	9,511	17.8%	7,838	14.6%	6,861	12.8%	5,550	10.4%	2,115	3.9%	2,026	3.8%	524	0.98%
Teignbridge	42.5%	18,341	41.6%	10,551	23.9%	1,765	4.0%	7,478	17.0%	3,189	7.2%	1,272	2.9%	1,133	2.6%	344	0.78%
Tewkesbury	38.0%	9,945	37.7%	6,534	24.8%	1,025	3.9%	3,785	14.4%	3,084	11.7%	863	3.3%	887	3.4%	225	0.85%
Torbay	36.3%	18,821	51.6%	6,824	18.7%	1,635	4.5%	3,715	10.2%	2,786	7.6%	1,416	3.9%	978	2.7%	308	0.84%
Torridge	39.7%	10,202	48.7%	3,657	17.4%	906	4.3%	3,038	14.5%	1,540	7.3%	896	4.3%	488	2.3%	235	1.12%
West Devon	45.9%	7,968	40.7%	3,908	19.9%	733	3.7%	3,721	19.0%	1,859	9.5%	600	3.1%	579	3.0%	224	1.14%
Wiltshire	44.3%	56,613	35.8%	39,811	25.1%	6,679	4.2%	25,751	16.3%	17,875	11.3%	5,010	3.2%	5,073	3.2%	1,522	0.96%

==== Gibraltar ====
Overseas Territory	Voter turnout, of eligible	Votes															
Overseas Territory	Voter turnout, of eligible	Brexit		Lib Dem		Labour		Green		Conservative		UKIP		Change UK		Others	
Overseas Territory	Voter turnout, of eligible	#	%	#	%	#	%	#	%	#	%	#	%	#	%	#	%
Gibraltar	39.8%	746	8.0%	7,220	77.4%	411	4.4%	467	5.0%	256	2.7%	84	0.9%	77	0.8%	70	0.75%

==== Best and worst results for each party ====
		Brexit		Liberal Democrat		Labour		Green		Conservative	
		Local authority	%	Local authority	%	Local authority	%	Local authority	%	Local authority	%
Best	1	Torbay	51.6	Cheltenham	36.5	Swindon	14.6	Bristol	35.1	Cotswold	12.5
Best	2	Torridge	48.7	Bath and North East Somerset	35.0	Bristol	13.9	Stroud	28.3	Tewkesbury	11.7
Best	3	Sedgemoor	45.1	Cotswold	30.2	Exeter	12.3	Exeter	27.2	Wiltshire	11.3
Best	4	Plymouth	42.8	Mendip	25.9	Plymouth	12.3	Isles of Scilly	24.8	Isles of Scilly	10.5
Best	5	North Devon	42.7	Somerset West and Taunton	25.9	Gloucester	11.9	Mendip	22.8	Swindon	10.4
Best	6	South Somerset	42.6	South Somerset	25.5	Forest of Dean	7.3	South Hams	21.7	Sedgemoor	10.2
Best	7	Dorset	41.9	Wiltshire	25.1	South Gloucestershire	7.2	Bath and North East Somerset	20.6	Dorset	10.1
Best	8	Bournemouth, Christchurch and Poole	41.8	Tewkesbury	24.8	Stroud	6.7	Mid Devon	19.1	Gloucester	10.1
Best	9	Forest of Dean	41.8	Isles of Scilly	24.1	Cornwall	6.2	West Devon	19.0	South Gloucestershire	10.1
Best	10	Teignbridge	41.6	South Gloucestershire	24.1	Isles of Scilly	5.7	Cornwall	18.1	West Devon	9.5
Worst	1	Bristol	18.6	Plymouth	14.1	Cotswold	2.8	Torbay	10.2	Bristol	4.7
Worst	2	Bath and North East Somerset	26.5	Forest of Dean	16.8	South Somerset	3.2	Sedgemoor	12.0	Exeter	5.9
Worst	3	Cheltenham	27.0	Torridge	17.4	East Devon	3.5	Gloucester	12.6	Bath and North East Somerset	6.8
Worst	4	Isles of Scilly	27.8	Swindon	17.8	West Devon	3.7	Swindon	12.8	Teignbridge	7.2
Worst	5	Exeter	28.1	Torbay	18.7	Somerset West and Taunton	3.8	South Somerset	13.0	Torridge	7.3
Worst	6	Stroud	29.2	Gloucester	19.4	South Hams	3.8	Plymouth	13.7	Torbay	7.6
Worst	7	Mendip	33.0	West Devon	19.9	North Devon	3.9	Somerset West and Taunton	14.0	Cornwall	7.7
Worst	8	Cotswold	34.3	Cornwall	20.0	Tewkesbury	3.9	Cotswold	14.1	North Somerset	8.1
Worst	9	South Hams	35.6	Exeter	20.2	Dorset	4.0	Tewkesbury	14.4	Mendip	8.4
Worst	10	Swindon	35.7	East Devon	20.3	Mendip	4.0	Torridge	14.5	Bournemouth, Christchurch and Poole	8.5

		Change UK		UKIP	
		Local authority	%	Local authority	%
Best	1	Swindon	3.8	Plymouth	4.7
Best	2	Isles of Scilly	3.6	Torridge	4.3
Best	3	North Somerset	3.5	Sedgemoor	4.0
Best	4	Tewkesbury	3.4	Swindon	3.9
Best	5	East Devon	3.3	Torbay	3.9
Best	6	South Hams	3.3	Bournemouth, Christchurch and Poole	3.8
Best	7	Bournemouth, Christchurch and Poole	3.2	Gloucester	3.8
Best	8	Wiltshire	3.2	North Devon	3.7
Best	9	Cotswold	3.1	Cornwall	3.6
Best	10	Cheltenham	3.0	Dorset	3.6
Worst	1	North Devon	2.0	Cheltenham	2.1
Worst	2	Sedgemoor	2.2	South Hams	2.2
Worst	3	Bristol	2.3	Bath and North East Somerset	2.3
Worst	4	Torridge	2.3	Bristol	2.3
Worst	5	Cornwall	2.4	Isles of Scilly	2.3
Worst	6	Mendip	2.4	Stroud	2.3
Worst	7	South Somerset	2.4	Cotswold	2.4
Worst	8	Dorset	2.5	Exeter	2.7
Worst	9	Teignbridge	2.6	Mendip	2.7
Worst	10	Forest of Dean	2.7	Teignbridge	2.9

=== West Midlands (7 seats) ===
Map showing highest polling party by counting area in the West Midlands electoral region.

European Election 2019: West Midlands
List	Candidates	Votes	Of total (%)	± from prev.
Brexit Party	Rupert Lowe, Martin Daubney, Andrew England Kerr Vishal Khatri, Nikki Page, Laura Kevehazi, Katharine Harborne	507,152 (169,050.7)	37.66	N/A
Labour	Neena Gill Sion Simon, Julia Buckley, Ansar Khan, Zarah Sultana, Sam Hennessy, Liz Clements	228,298	16.95	▼9.76
Liberal Democrats	Phil Bennion Ade Adeyemo, Jeanie Falconer, Jenny Wilkinson, Jennifer Gray, Beverley Nielsen, Lee Dargue	219,982	16.33	▲10.77
Green	Ellie Chowns Diana Toynbee, Paul Woodhead, Julian Dean, Louis Stephen, Helen Heathfield, Kefentse Dennis	143,520	10.66	▲5.40
Conservative	Anthea McIntyre Daniel Dalton, Suzanne Webb, Meirion Jenkins, Alex Philips, Mary Noone, Ahmed Ejaz	135,279	10.04	▼14.27
UKIP	Ernest Valentine, Paul Williams, Graham Eardley, Paul Allen, Nigel Ely, Joe Smyth, Derek Bennett	66,934	4.97	▼26.52
Change UK	Stephen Dorrell, Charlotte Gath, Peter Wilding, Amrik Kandola, Joanna McKenna, Victor Odusanya, Lucinda Empson	45,673	3.39	N/A
Turnout		1,355,216	32.9%	

The West Midlands electoral region is broken down into 30 voting areas.

District	Turnout		Brexit		Lib Dem		Labour		Green		Conservative		UKIP		Change UK	
District	#	%	#	%	#	%	#	%	#	%	#	%	#	%	#	%
Birmingham	220,280	31.1%	52,953	24.0	35,880	16.3	77,551	35.2	24,614	11.2	15,133	6.9	8,074	3.7	6,075	2.8
Bromsgrove	27,297	37.3%	10,700	39.2	5,857	21.5	1,849	6.8	3,110	11.4	3,483	12.8	1,152	4.2	1,146	4.2
Cannock Chase	20,958	28.4%	10,538	50.3	1,951	9.3	2,373	11.3	1,912	9.1	2,111	10.1	1,468	7.0	605	2.9
Coventry	66,521	30.7%	21,260	32.0	10,081	15.2	16,991	25.5	7,820	11.8	5,083	7.6	3,269	4.9	2,017	3.0
Dudley	72,003	30.3%	34,149	47.4	8,051	11.2	10,620	14.7	5,317	7.4	7,510	10.4	4,488	6.2	1,868	2.6
East Staffordshire	27,369	33.3%	11,442	41.8	3,983	14.6	3,375	12.3	2,248	8.2	3,834	14.0	1,415	5.2	1,072	3.9
Herefordshire	55,196	39.8%	21,876	39.6	11,374	20.6	2,382	4.3	8,759	15.9	5,942	10.8	2,574	4.7	2,289	4.1
Lichfield	28,400	35.5%	12,185	42.9	5,490	19.3	1,950	6.7	3,012	10.6	3,396	12.0	1,358	4.8	1,009	3.6
Malvern Hills	25,842	43.3%	9,403	36.4	6,501	25.2	1,038	4.0	3,879	15.0	2,859	11.1	1,040	4.0	1,122	4.3
Newcastle-under-Lyme	30,773	33.9%	13,517	43.9	4,385	14.2	4,198	13.6	2,960	9.6	2,859	9.3	1,886	6.1	968	3.1
North Warwickshire	15,850	32.5%	7,881	49.7	1,865	11.8	1,536	9.7	1,328	8.4	1,680	10.6	1,056	6.7	504	3.2
Nuneaton and Bedworth	31,499	33.5%	14,369	45.6	3,767	12.0	4,678	14.9	2,757	8.8	3,031	9.6	1,950	6.2	947	3.0
Redditch	18,947	32.2%	8,162	43.1	2,657	14.0	2,326	12.3	1,655	8.7	2,195	11.6	1,166	6.2	786	4.1
Rugby	28,948	38.7%	10,987	38.0	6,255	21.6	2,937	10.1	3,140	10.8	3,330	11.5	1,224	4.2	1,075	3.7
Sandwell	60,071	27.9%	21,924	36.5	4,323	7.2	21,335	35.5	4,049	6.7	3,519	5.9	3,550	5.9	1,371	2.3
Shropshire	92,688	39.1%	36,260	39.1	19,505	21.0	6,665	7.2	12,242	13.2	10,753	11.6	3,924	4.2	3,339	3.6
Solihull	54,287	34.2%	21,371	39.4	11,387	21.0	3,632	6.7	6,775	12.5	7,068	13.0	2,124	3.9	1,930	3.6
South Staffordshire	28,052	33.2%	14,068	50.1	3,578	12.8	1,641	5.8	2,422	8.6	3,740	13.3	1,550	5.5	1,053	3.8
Stafford	35,757	42.5%	14,339	40.1	6,424	18.0	3,288	9.2	4,128	11.5	4,068	11.4	1,847	5.2	1,663	4.7
Staffordshire Moorlands	25,440	32.6%	12,021	47.3	3,683	14.5	2,149	8.4	2,462	9.7	2,781	10.9	1,369	5.4	975	3.8
Stoke-on-Trent	44,917	26.5%	20,434	45.5	4,117	9.2	9,055	20.2	3,036	6.8	3,438	7.7	3,213	7.2	1,624	3.6
Stratford-on-Avon	41,969	26.5%	14,723	35.1	11,329	27.0	1,628	3.9	5,169	12.3	5,761	13.7	1,535	3.7	1,824	4.3
Tamworth	17,107	30.6%	8,067	47.2	1,994	11.7	1,830	10.7	1,306	7.6	2,115	12.4	1,238	7.2	557	3.3
Telford and Wrekin	40,964	33.1%	16,811	41.0	5,627	13.7	6,775	16.5	3,445	8.4	4,407	10.8	2,351	5.7	1,548	3.8
Walsall	55,069	28.7%	23,531	42.7	5,353	9.7	11,838	21.5	3,125	5.7	5,842	10.6	3,866	7.0	1,514	2.7
Warwick	44,419	42.0%	11,207	25.2	13,233	29.8	4,231	9.5	8,289	18.7	4,406	9.9	1,133	2.6	1,920	4.3
Wolverhampton	48,986	28.8%	18,110	37.0	5,100	10.4	13,706	28.0	3,531	7.2	4,436	9.1	2,864	5.8	1,239	2.5
Worcester	25,407	35.3%	8,364	32.9	5,018	19.8	3,109	12.2	4,293	16.9	2,478	9.8	1,172	4.6	973	3.8
Wychavon	37,388	39.2%	15,262	40.8	7,492	20.0	1,757	4.7	4,116	11.0	5,539	14.8	1,655	4.4	1,567	4.2
Wyre Forest	24,434	32.6%	11,238	46.0	3,722	15.2	1,855	7.6	2,621	10.7	2,482	10.2	1,423	5.8	1,093	4.5

==== Best and worst results for each party ====
		Brexit		Liberal Democrat		Labour		Green		Conservative	
		Local authority	%	Local authority	%	Local authority	%	Local authority	%	Local authority	%
Best	1	Cannock Chase	50.3	Warwick	29.8	Sandwell	35.5	Warwick	18.7	Wychavon	14.8
Best	2	South Staffordshire	50.1	Stratford-on-Avon	27.0	Birmingham	35.2	Worcester	16.9	East Staffordshire	14.0
Best	3	North Warwickshire	49.7	Malvern Hills	25.2	Wolverhampton	28.0	Herefordshire	15.9	Stratford-on-Avon	13.7
Best	4	Dudley	47.4	Rugby	21.6	Coventry	25.5	Malvern Hills	15.0	South Staffordshire	13.3
Best	5	Staffordshire Moorlands	47.3	Bromsgrove	21.5	Walsall	21.5	Shropshire	13.2	Solihull	13.0
Best	6	Tamworth	47.2	Shropshire	21.0	Stoke-on-Trent	20.2	Solihull	12.5	Bromsgrove	12.8
Best	7	Wyre Forest	46.0	Solihull	21.0	Telford and Wrekin	16.5	Stratford-on-Avon	12.3	Tamworth	12.4
Best	8	Nuneaton and Bedworth	45.6	Herefordshire	20.6	Nuneaton and Bedworth	14.9	Coventry	11.8	Lichfield	12.0
Best	9	Stoke-on-Trent	45.5	Wychavon	20.0	Dudley	14.7	Stafford	11.5	Redditch	11.6
Best	10	Newcastle-under-Lyme	43.9	Worcester	19.8	Newcastle-under-Lyme	13.6	Bromsgrove	11.4	Shropshire	11.6
Worst	1	Birmingham	24.0	Sandwell	7.2	Stratford-on-Avon	3.9	Walsall	5.7	Sandwell	5.9
Worst	2	Warwick	25.2	Stoke-on-Trent	9.2	Malvern Hills	4.0	Sandwell	6.7	Birmingham	6.9
Worst	3	Coventry	32.0	Cannock Chase	9.3	Herefordshire	4.3	Stoke-on-Trent	6.8	Coventry	7.6
Worst	4	Worcester	32.9	Walsall	9.7	Wychavon	4.7	Wolverhampton	7.2	Stoke-on-Trent	7.7
Worst	5	Stratford-on-Avon	35.1	Wolverhampton	10.4	South Staffordshire	5.8	Dudley	7.4	Wolverhampton	9.1
Worst	6	Malvern Hills	36.4	Dudley	11.2	Lichfield	6.7	Tamworth	7.6	Newcastle-under-Lyme	9.3
Worst	7	Sandwell	36.5	Tamworth	11.7	Solihull	6.7	East Staffordshire	8.2	Nuneaton and Bedworth	9.6
Worst	8	Wolverhampton	37.0	North Warwickshire	11.8	Bromsgrove	6.8	North Warwickshire	8.4	Worcester	9.8
Worst	9	Rugby	38.0	Nuneaton and Bedworth	12.0	Shropshire	7.2	Telford and Wrekin	8.4	Warwick	9.9
Worst	10	Shropshire	39.1	South Staffordshire	12.8	Wyre Forest	7.6	South Staffordshire	8.6	Cannock Chase	10.1

		Change UK		UKIP	
		Local authority	%	Local authority	%
Best	1	Stafford	4.7	Stoke-on-Trent	7.2
Best	2	Wyre Forest	4.5	Tamworth	7.2
Best	3	Malvern Hills	4.3	Cannock Chase	7.0
Best	4	Stratford-on-Avon	4.3	Walsall	7.0
Best	5	Warwick	4.3	North Warwickshire	6.7
Best	6	Bromsgrove	4.2	Dudley	6.2
Best	7	Wychavon	4.2	Nuneaton and Bedworth	6.2
Best	8	Herefordshire	4.1	Redditch	6.2
Best	9	Redditch	4.1	Newcastle-under-Lyme	6.1
Best	10	East Staffordshire	3.9	Sandwell	5.9
Worst	1	Sandwell	2.3	Warwick	2.6
Worst	2	Wolverhampton	2.5	Birmingham	3.7
Worst	3	Dudley	2.6	Stratford-on-Avon	3.7
Worst	4	Walsall	2.7	Solihull	3.9
Worst	5	Birmingham	2.8	Malvern Hills	4.0
Worst	6	Cannock Chase	2.9	Bromsgrove	4.2
Worst	7	Coventry	3.0	Rugby	4.2
Worst	8	Nuneaton and Bedworth	3.0	Shropshire	4.2
Worst	9	Newcastle-under-Lyme	3.1	Wychavon	4.4
Worst	10	North Warwickshire	3.2	Worcester	4.6

=== Yorkshire and the Humber (6 seats) ===
Map showing highest polling party by counting area in the Yorkshire and the Humber electoral region.

European election 2019: Yorkshire and the Humber
List	Candidates	Votes	Of total (%)	± from prev.
Brexit Party	John Longworth, Lucy Harris, Jake Pugh James Heartfield, Andrew Allison, Christopher Barker	470,351 (156,783.7)	36.5%	N/A
Labour	Richard Corbett Eloise Todd, Jawad Mohammed Khan, Jayne Allport, Martin Mayer, Alison Hume	210,516	16.3%	▼13.0%
Liberal Democrats	Shaffaq Mohammed Rosina Robson, James Blanchard, Sophie Thornton, James Baker, Ruth Coleman-Taylor	200,180	15.5%	▲9.3%
Green	Magid Magid Alison Teal, Andrew Cooper, Louise Houghton, Lars Kramm, Ann Forsaith	166,980	13.0%	▲5.1%
Conservative	John Procter, Amjad Bashir, Michael Naughton, Andrew Lee, Matthew Freckleton, Sue Pascoe	92,863	7.2%	▼12.0%
UKIP	Mike Hookem, Gary Shores, John Hancock, David Dews, Graeme Waddicar, Clifford Parsons	56,100	4.4%	▼26.8%
Yorkshire	Chris Whitwood, Mike Jordan, Jack Carrington, Laura Walker, Bob Buxton, Dan Cochran	50,842	3.9%	▲2.5%
Change UK	Diana Wallis, Juliet Lodge, Sophia Bow, Joshua Malkin, Rosanne McMullen, Steven Wilson	30,162	2.3%	N/A
English Democrat	David Allen, Tony Allen, Joanne Allen, Fiona Allen	11,283	0.9%	▼0.1%
Turnout		1,289,277	33.5%	

The Yorkshire and the Humber electoral region is broken down into 21 local council areas.

District	Turnout		Brexit		Lib Dem		Labour		Green		Conservative		UKIP		Change UK		Yorkshire		Eng Dem	
District	#	%	#	%	#	%	#	%	#	%	#	%	#	%	#	%	#	%	#	%
Barnsley		28.0%	23,459	47.6	4,618	9.4	7,693	15.6	4,064	8.2	1,878	3.8	2,899	5.9	1,200	2.4	2,892	5.9	616	1.2
Bradford		32.0%	33,567	29.9	15,882	14.1	32,399	28.8	12,401	11.0	7,521	6.7	4,169	3.7	1,948	1.7	3,596	3.2	966	0.9
Calderdale		35.7%	18,838	35.6	7,493	14.2	9,724	18.4	6,902	13.0	4,261	8.1	1,908	3.6	1,111	2.1	2,258	4.3	425	0.8
Craven		41.6%	6,302	34.4	3,677	20.1	1,190	6.5	3,091	16.9	2,041	11.1	620	3.4	497	2.7	811	4.4	109	0.6
Doncaster		30.8%	30,016	45.0	5,908	8.9	11,393	17.1	4,898	7.3	4,122	6.2	3,862	5.8	1,565	2.3	3,963	5.9	953	1.4
East Riding of Yorkshire		33.8%	39,465	44.4	13,976	15.7	6,051	6.8	8,558	9.6	9,545	10.7	3,937	4.4	2,371	2.7	4,179	4.7	734	0.8
Hambleton		40.7%	10,615	36.8	5,389	18.7	1,410	4.9	3,599	12.5	4,197	14.5	1,035	3.6	892	3.1	1,511	5.2	232	0.8
Harrogate		42.8%	16,039	31.8	13,707	27.1	2,248	4.5	6,447	12.8	6,364	12.6	1,509	3.0	1,698	3.4	2,197	4.4	232	0.6
Kingston upon Hull		24.0%	18,572	44.0	5,667	13.4	7,832	18.6	3,887	9.2	1,229	2.9	2,725	6.5	685	1.6	1,157	2.7	462	1.1
Kirklees		34.7%	35,843	34.2	14,845	14.2	25,435	24.2	10,934	10.4	6,820	6.5	4,076	3.9	2,103	2.0	3,967	3.8	872	0.8
Leeds		34.2%	53,600	28.9	34,076	18.4	36,377	19.6	29,603	16.0	12,824	6.9	6,380	3.4	4,813	2.6	6,417	3.5	1,348	0.7
North East Lincolnshire		28.7%	16,895	51.9	2,916	9.0	3,444	10.6	2,370	7.3	3,224	9.9	2,234	6.9	871	2.7	168	0.5	445	1.4
North Lincolnshire		31.4%	18,308	47.0	3,866	9.9	4,882	12.5	3,206	8.2	4,475	11.5	2,234	5.7	1,020	2.6	466	1.2	481	1.2
Richmondshire		36.3%	5,280	39.8	2,508	18.9	543	4.1	1,571	11.8	1,681	12.7	475	3.6	479	3.6	593	4.5	130	1.0
Rotherham		32.5%	26,951	43.3	5,478	8.8	11,373	18.3	5,471	8.8	3,208	5.2	3,902	6.3	1,400	2.2	3,719	6.0	739	1.2
Ryedale		39.3%	6,190	37.9	3,176	19.5	807	4.9	2,115	13.0	2,014	12.3	540	3.3	473	2.9	899	5.5	115	0.7
Scarborough		35.5%	12,624	43.4	4,017	13.8	2,853	9.8	3,224	11.1	2,528	8.7	1,435	4.9	780	2.7	1,387	4.8	253	0.9
Selby		36.2%	9,733	40.3	3,803	15.8	2,035	8.4	2,490	10.3	2,480	10.3	995	4.1	728	3.0	1,685	7.0	184	0.8
Sheffield		35.9%	39,534	28.1	25,366	18.1	23,925	17.0	34,803	24.8	4,827	3.4	5,408	3.9	2,492	1.8	3,089	2.2	998	0.7
Wakefield		29.9%	33,173	44.9	7,472	10.0	12,661	17.0	5,923	8.0	4,267	5.7	4,317	5.8	1,548	2.1	4,381	5.9	670	0.9
York		39.9%	15,347	26.7	16,340	28.5	6,241	10.9	11,423	19.9	3,357	5.8	1,140	2.5	1,488	2.6	1,507	2.6	273	0.5

==== Best and worst results for each party ====
		Brexit		Liberal Democrat		Labour		Green		Conservative	
		Local authority	%	Local authority	%	Local authority	%	Local authority	%	Local authority	%
Best	1	North East Lincolnshire	51.9	York	28.5	Bradford	28.8	Sheffield	24.8	Hambleton	14.5
Best	2	Barnsley	47.6	Harrogate	27.1	Kirklees	24.2	York	19.9	Richmondshire	12.7
Best	3	North Lincolnshire	47.0	Craven	20.1	Leeds	19.6	Craven	16.9	Harrogate	12.6
Best	4	Doncaster	45.0	Ryedale	19.5	Kingston upon Hull	18.6	Leeds	16.0	Ryedale	12.3
Best	5	Wakefield	44.9	Richmondshire	18.9	Calderdale	18.4	Calderdale	13.0	North Lincolnshire	11.5
Best	6	East Riding of Yorkshire	44.4	Hambleton	18.7	Rotherham	18.3	Ryedale	13.0	Craven	11.1
Best	7	Kingston upon Hull	44.0	Leeds	18.4	Doncaster	17.1	Harrogate	12.8	East Riding of Yorkshire	10.7
Best	8	Scarborough	43.4	Sheffield	18.1	Sheffield	17.0	Hambleton	12.5	Selby	10.3
Best	9	Rotherham	43.3	Selby	15.8	Wakefield	17.0	Richmondshire	11.8	North East Lincolnshire	9.9
Best	10	Selby	40.3	East Riding of Yorkshire	15.7	Barnsley	15.6	Scarborough	11.1	Scarborough	8.7
Worst	1	York	26.7	Rotherham	8.8	Richmondshire	4.1	Doncaster	7.3	Kingston upon Hull	2.9
Worst	2	Sheffield	28.1	Doncaster	8.9	Harrogate	4.5	North East Lincolnshire	7.3	Sheffield	3.4
Worst	3	Leeds	28.9	North East Lincolnshire	9.0	Hambleton	4.9	Wakefield	8.0	Barnsley	3.8
Worst	4	Bradford	29.9	Barnsley	9.4	Ryedale	4.9	Barnsley	8.2	Rotherham	5.2
Worst	5	Harrogate	31.8	North Lincolnshire	9.9	Craven	6.5	North Lincolnshire	8.2	Wakefield	5.7
Worst	6	Kirklees	34.2	Wakefield	10.0	East Riding of Yorkshire	6.8	Rotherham	8.8	York	5.8
Worst	7	Craven	34.4	Kingston upon Hull	13.4	Selby	8.4	Kingston upon Hull	9.2	Doncaster	6.2
Worst	8	Calderdale	35.6	Scarborough	13.8	Scarborough	9.8	East Riding of Yorkshire	9.6	Kirklees	6.5
Worst	9	Hambleton	36.8	Bradford	14.1	North East Lincolnshire	10.6	Selby	10.3	Bradford	6.7
Worst	10	Ryedale	37.9	Calderdale	14.2	York	10.9	Kirklees	10.4	Leeds	6.9

		Change UK		UKIP		Yorkshire		Eng Dem	
		Local authority	%	Local authority	%	Local authority	%	Local authority	%
Best	1	Richmondshire	3.6	North East Lincolnshire	6.9	Selby	7.0	Doncaster	1.4
Best	2	Harrogate	3.4	Kingston upon Hull	6.5	Rotherham	6.0	North East Lincolnshire	1.4
Best	3	Hambleton	3.1	Rotherham	6.3	Barnsley	5.9	Barnsley	1.2
Best	4	Selby	3.0	Barnsley	5.9	Doncaster	5.9	North Lincolnshire	1.2
Best	5	Ryedale	2.9	Doncaster	5.8	Wakefield	5.9	Rotherham	1.2
Best	6	Craven	2.7	Wakefield	5.8	Ryedale	5.5	Kingston upon Hull	1.1
Best	7	East Riding of Yorkshire	2.7	North Lincolnshire	5.7	Hambleton	5.2	Richmondshire	1.0
Best	8	North East Lincolnshire	2.7	Scarborough	4.9	Scarborough	4.8	Bradford	0.9
Best	9	Scarborough	2.7	East Riding of Yorkshire	4.4	East Riding of Yorkshire	4.7	Scarborough	0.9
Best	10	Leeds	2.6	Selby	4.1	Richmondshire	4.5	Wakefield	0.9
Worst	1	Kingston upon Hull	1.6	York	2.5	North East Lincolnshire	0.5	York	0.5
Worst	2	Bradford	1.7	Harrogate	3.0	North Lincolnshire	1.2	Craven	0.6
Worst	3	Sheffield	1.8	Ryedale	3.3	Sheffield	2.2	Harrogate	0.6
Worst	4	Kirklees	2.0	Craven	3.4	York	2.6	Leeds	0.7
Worst	5	Calderdale	2.1	Leeds	3.4	Kingston upon Hull	2.7	Ryedale	0.7
Worst	6	Wakefield	2.1	Calderdale	3.6	Bradford	3.2	Sheffield	0.7
Worst	7	Rotherham	2.2	Hambleton	3.6	Leeds	3.5	Calderdale	0.8
Worst	8	Doncaster	2.3	Richmondshire	3.6	Kirklees	3.8	East Riding of Yorkshire	0.8
Worst	9	Barnsley	2.4	Bradford	3.7	Calderdale	4.3	Hambleton	0.8
Worst	10	North Lincolnshire	2.6	Kirklees	3.9	Craven	4.4	Kirklees	0.8

== Northern Ireland (3 seats) ==
2019 European Parliament election: Northern Ireland
Party	Candidate	FPv%	Count				
Party	Candidate	FPv%	1	2	3	4	5
DUP	Diane Dodds	21.83	124,991	127,291	155,422		
Alliance	Naomi Long	18.50	105,928	115,327	122,263	123,917.00	170,370.00
Sinn Féin	Martina Anderson	22.17	126,951	128,117	128,190	128,200.50	152,436.50
TUV	Jim Allister	10.83	62,021	63,872	79,540	89,854.00	90,079.00
SDLP	Colum Eastwood	13.72	78,589	80,949	82,101	82,413.50	
UUP	Danny Kennedy	9.26	53,052	54,736			
Green (NI)	Clare Bailey	2.18	12,471				
UKIP	Robert Hill	0.89	5,115				
Independent	Jane Morrice	0.30	1,719				
Independent	Neil McCann	0.17	948				
NI Conservatives	Amandeep Singh Bhogal	0.12	662				
Electorate: 1,278,951 Valid: 572,447 Spoilt: 4,649 (0.81%) Quota: 143,112 Turnout: 577,275 (45.14%)

== Scotland (6 seats) ==
Map showing highest polling party by counting area in the Scotland electoral region.

European Election 2019: Scotland
List	Candidates	Votes	Of total (%)	± from prev.
SNP	Alyn Smith, Christian Allard, Aileen McLeod Margaret Ferrier, Heather Anderson, Alex Kerr	594,553 (198,184.3)	37.8%	+8.8
Brexit Party	Louis Stedman-Bryce Karina Walker, James Ferguson-Hannah, Stuart Waiton, Paul Aitken, Calum Walker	233,006	14.8%	N/A
Liberal Democrats	Sheila Ritchie Fred Mackintosh, Catriona Bhatia, Vita Zaporozcenko, John Edward, Clive Sneddon	218,285	13.8%	+6.8
Conservative	Nosheena Mobarik Ian McGill, Shona Haslam, Iain Whyte, Andrea Gee, Michael Kusznir	182,476	11.6%	−5.6
Labour	David Martin, Jayne Baxter, Craig Miller, Amy Lee Fraioli, Callum O’Dwyer, Angela Bretherton	146,724	9.3%	−16.6
Green	Maggie Chapman, Lorna Slater, Gillian Mackay, Chas Booth, Mags Hall, Allan Faulds	129,603	8.2%	+0.1
Change UK – The Independent Group	David Macdonald,^{1} Kate Forman, Peter Griffiths, Heather Astbury, Colin McFadyen, Cathy Edgeworth	30,004	1.9%	N/A
UKIP	Donald MacKay, Janice MacKay, Otto Inglis, Mark Meechan, Roy Hill	28,418	1.8%	−8.7
Independent	Gordon Edgar	6,128	0.4%	N/A
Independent	Ken Parke	2,049	0.1%	N/A
Turnout		1,571,246	39.9%	+ 6.4

The Scotland electoral region is broken down into 32 local council areas.

District	Voter turnout, of eligible	SNP		Brexit		Lib Dem		Labour		Green		Conservative		UKIP		Change UK		Others	
District	Voter turnout, of eligible	#	%	#	%	#	%	#	%	#	%	#	%	#	%	#	%	#	%
Aberdeen City	38.9%	19,541	34.6	8,828	15.6	9,574	16.9	4,785	8.5	3,925	6.9	7,215	12.8	1,034	1.8	1,359	2.4	296	0.6
Aberdeenshire	38.6%	23,255	31.4	14,671	19.8	12,496	16.9	2,199	3.0	4,573	6.2	13,297	18.0	1,614	2.2	1,526	2.1	376	0.5
Angus	38.8%	12,998	38.8	6,270	18.7	3,526	10.5	1,430	4.3	1,996	6.0	5,767	17.2	610	1.8	635	1.9	244	0.7
Argyll and Bute	46.8%	11,366	37.2	5,450	17.9	5,019	16.4	1,197	3.9	2,255	7.4	3,985	13.1	568	1.9	505	1.7	184	0.6
Clackmannanshire	37.0%	5,581	39.8	2,282	16.3	1,363	9.7	1,586	11.3	973	6.9	1,677	12.0	278	2.0	223	1.6	62	0.4
Dumfries and Galloway	40.6%	12,670	27.8	9,981	21.9	4,544	10.0	3,207	7.0	3,140	6.9	9,651	21.1	1,228	2.7	913	2.0	308	0.6
Dundee City	35.7%	17,074	46.1	5,191	14.0	3,459	9.3	4,228	11.4	2,708	7.3	2,995	8.1	644	1.7	552	1.5	201	0.5
East Ayrshire	33.2%	12,617	41.1	5,044	16.4	2,441	8.0	3,966	13.0	1,677	5.5	3,464	11.3	677	2.2	615	2.0	175	0.6
East Dunbartonshire	47.1%	13,414	34.5	4,787	12.3	9,615	24.8	2,617	6.7	3,112	8.0	3,925	10.1	470	1.2	708	1.8	193	0.6
East Lothian	42.9%	10,992	32.6	4,481	13.3	5,079	15.1	3,986	11.8	3,095	9.2	4,635	13.8	532	1.6	679	2.0	133	0.4
East Renfrewshire	48.4%	11,366	33.6	4,016	11.9	5,487	16.2	2,834	8.4	2,560	7.6	5,898	17.5	416	1.2	995	3.0	234	0.7
City of Edinburgh	50.2%	57,432	33.3	16,162	9.4	39,609	22.9	12,251	7.1	23,868	13.8	17,222	10.0	1,864	1.1	3,269	1.9	525	0.4
Falkirk	35.6%	18,102	43.0	7,160	17.0	3,836	9.1	4,132	9.9	2,717	6.5	3,913	9.3	932	2.2	1,044	2.5	298	0.7
Fife	38.9%	39,446	37.6	16,738	16.0	17,269	16.5	10,216	9.7	7,059	6.7	9,916	9.5	1,962	1.9	1,798	1.7	544	0.5
Glasgow City	35.8%	68,216	43.9	15,276	9.8	14,357	9.2	23,423	15.0	18,862	12.1	9,700	6.2	2,496	1.6	2,511	1.6	641	0.4
Highland	43.2%	28,681	37.3	13,854	18.0	13,416	17.4	3,109	4.0	7,052	9.2	7,577	9.9	1,619	2.1	1,199	1.6	410	0.5
Inverclyde	39.9%	9,237	41.9	3,207	14.6	2,225	10.1	3,236	14.7	1,136	5.2	2,054	9.3	384	1.7	425	1.9	127	0.6
Midlothian	38.2%	9,773	37.1	3,709	14.1	3,463	13.1	3,261	12.4	2,379	9.0	2,405	9.1	550	2.1	596	2.3	152	0.6
Moray	38.0%	9,027	34.1	5,807	21.9	2,686	10.1	958	3.6	1,910	7.2	4,648	17.5	656	2.5	585	2.2	210	0.8
North Ayrshire	35.6%	15,493	41.6	6,524	17.5	2,934	7.9	3,766	10.1	2,093	5.6	4,662	12.5	820	2.2	734	2.0	226	0.6
North Lanarkshire	33.6%	38,232	45.4	11,789	14.0	5,846	6.9	13,820	16.4	4,330	5.1	6,561	7.8	1,730	2.1	1,483	1.8	392	0.5
Perth and Kinross	45.9%	18,116	35.8	8,088	16.0	7,350	14.5	1,518	3.0	3,698	7.3	9,856	19.5	770	1.5	889	1.8	264	0.6
Renfrewshire	40.3%	21,870	41.6	7,189	13.7	5,660	10.8	6,976	13.3	3,545	6.7	4,941	9.4	991	1.9	1,090	2.1	330	0.5
Scottish Borders	43.0%	10,761	28.3	7,188	18.9	6,900	18.1	1,059	2.8	2,997	7.9	7,152	18.8	671	1.8	730	1.9	408	1.1
Stirling	46.7%	11,780	38.3	3,774	12.3	4,645	15.1	1,915	6.2	2,937	9.6	4,643	15.1	401	1.3	558	1.8	93	0.3
South Lanarkshire	37.6%	37,552	40.7	13,818	15.0	9,751	10.6	11,543	12.5	5,815	6.3	9,838	10.7	1,668	1.8	1,819	2.0	472	0.4
South Ayrshire	40.8%	12,254	34.2	6,199	17.3	3,763	10.5	2,609	7.3	2,064	5.8	7,334	20.5	687	1.9	720	2.0	219	0.6
West Dunbartonshire	35.7%	10,670	45.5	3,240	13.8	1,706	7.3	3,748	16.0	1,554	6.6	1,484	6.3	486	2.1	417	1.8	138	0.6
West Lothian	38.5%	20,132	39.9	8,278	16.4	5,510	10.9	5,826	11.6	3,512	7.0	4,609	9.1	1,143	2.3	1,130	2.2	290	0.6
Na h-Eileanan Siar (Western Isles)	39.3%	3,606	43.7	1,640	19.9	611	7.4	814	9.8	581	7.0	611	7.4	189	2.3	130	1.6	28	0.3
Orkney	38.3%	1,548	24.2	1,035	16.2	2,144	33.5	204	3.2	724	11.3	499	7.8	157	2.5	75	1.2	21	0.1
Shetland	39.6%	1,751	25.9	1,330	19.7	2,001	29.6	305	4.5	756	11.2	342	5.1	151	2.2	82	1.2	32	0.5

=== Best and worst results for each party ===
		Brexit		Liberal Democrat		Labour		Green		Conservative		SNP	
		Local authority	%	Local authority	%	Local authority	%	Local authority	%	Local authority	%	Local authority	%
Best	1	Dumfries and Galloway	21.9	Orkney	33.5	North Lanarkshire	16.4	City of Edinburgh	13.8	Dumfries and Galloway	21.1	Dundee City	46.1
Best	2	Moray	21.9	Shetland	29.6	West Dunbartonshire	16.0	Glasgow City	12.1	South Ayrshire	20.5	West Dunbartonshire	45.5
Best	3	Na h-Eileanan Siar (Western Isles)	19.9	East Dunbartonshire	24.8	Glasgow City	15.0	Orkney	11.3	Perth and Kinross	19.5	North Lanarkshire	45.4
Best	4	Aberdeenshire	19.8	City of Edinburgh	22.9	Inverclyde	14.7	Shetland	11.2	Scottish Borders	18.8	Glasgow City	43.9
Best	5	Shetland	19.7	Scottish Borders	18.1	Renfrewshire	13.3	Stirling	9.6	Aberdeenshire	18.0	Na h-Eileanan Siar	43.7
Best	6	Scottish Borders	18.9	Highland	17.4	East Ayrshire	13.0	East Lothian	9.2	East Renfrewshire	17.5	Falkirk	43.0
Best	7	Angus	18.7	Aberdeen City	16.9	South Lanarkshire	12.5	Highland	9.2	Moray	17.5	Inverclyde	41.9
Best	8	Highland	18.0	Aberdeenshire	16.9	Midlothian	12.4	Midlothian	9.0	Angus	17.2	Renfrewshire	41.6
Best	9	Argyll and Bute	17.9	Fife	16.5	East Lothian	11.8	East Dunbartonshire	8.0	Stirling	15.1	North Ayrshire	41.6
Best	10	North Ayrshire	17.5	Argyll and Bute	16.4	West Lothian	11.6	Scottish Borders	7.9	East Lothian	13.8	East Ayrshire	41.1
Worst	1	City of Edinburgh	9.4	North Lanarkshire	6.9	Scottish Borders	2.8	North Lanarkshire	5.1	Shetland	5.1	Orkney	24.2
Worst	2	Glasgow City	9.8	West Dunbartonshire	7.3	Perth and Kinross	3.0	Inverclyde	5.2	Glasgow City	6.2	Shetland	25.9
Worst	3	East Renfrewshire	11.9	Na h-Eileanan Siar (Western Isles)	7.4	Aberdeenshire	3.0	East Ayrshire	5.5	West Dunbartonshire	6.3	Dumfries and Galloway	27.8
Worst	4	East Dunbartonshire	12.3	North Ayrshire	7.9	Orkney	3.2	North Ayrshire	5.6	Na h-Eileanan Siar (Western Isles)	7.4	Scottish Borders	28.3
Worst	5	Stirling	12.3	East Ayrshire	8.0	Moray	3.6	South Ayrshire	5.8	North Lanarkshire	7.8	Aberdeenshire	31.4
Worst	6	East Lothian	13.3	Falkirk	9.1	Argyll and Bute	3.9	Angus	6.0	Orkney	7.8	East Lothian	32.6
Worst	7	Renfrewshire	13.7	Glasgow City	9.2	Highland	4.0	Aberdeenshire	6.2	Dundee City	8.1	City of Edinburgh	33.3
Worst	8	West Dunbartonshire	13.8	Dundee City	9.3	Angus	4.3	South Lanarkshire	6.3	Midlothian	9.1	East Renfrewshire	33.6
Worst	9	Dundee City	14.0	Clackmannanshire	9.7	Shetland	4.5	Falkirk	6.5	West Lothian	9.1	Moray	34.1
Worst	10	North Lanarkshire	14.0	Dumfries and Galloway	10.0	Stirling	6.2	West Dunbartonshire	6.6	Falkirk	9.3	South Ayrshire	34.2

		Change UK		UKIP	
		Local authority	%	Local authority	%
Best	1	East Renfrewshire	3.0	Dumfries and Galloway	2.7
Best	2	Falkirk	2.5	Moray	2.5
Best	3	Aberdeen City	2.4	Orkney	2.5
Best	4	Midlothian	2.3	Na h-Eileanan Siar (Western Isles)	2.3
Best	5	Moray	2.2	West Lothian	2.3
Best	6	West Lothian	2.2	Aberdeenshire	2.2
Best	7	Aberdeenshire	2.1	East Ayrshire	2.2
Best	8	Renfrewshire	2.1	Falkirk	2.2
Best	9	Dumfries and Galloway	2.0	North Ayrshire	2.2
Best	10	East Ayrshire	2.0	Shetland	2.2
Worst	1	Orkney	1.2	City of Edinburgh	1.1
Worst	2	Shetland	1.2	East Dunbartonshire	1.2
Worst	3	Dundee City	1.5	East Renfrewshire	1.2
Worst	4	Clackmannanshire	1.6	Stirling	1.3
Worst	5	Glasgow City	1.6	Perth and Kinross	1.5
Worst	6	Highland	1.6	East Lothian	1.6
Worst	7	Na h-Eileanan Siar (Western Isles)	1.6	Glasgow City	1.6
Worst	8	Argyll and Bute	1.7	Dundee City	1.7
Worst	9	Fife	1.7	Inverclyde	1.7
Worst	10	East Dunbartonshire	1.8	Aberdeen City	1.8

== Wales (4 seats) ==
Map showing highest polling party by counting area in the Wales electoral region.

European Election 2019: Wales
List	Candidates	Votes	Of total (%)	± from prev.
Brexit Party	Nathan Gill, James Wells Gethin James, Julie Price	271,404 (135,702)	32.5	N/A
Plaid Cymru	Jill Evans Carmen Smith, Patrick McGuinness, Ioan Bellin	163,928	19.6	+4.3
Labour	Jacqueline Jones Matthew Dorrance, Mary Wimbury, Mark Whitcott	127,833	15.3	−12.9
Liberal Democrats	Sam Bennett, Donna Lalek, Alistair Cameron, Andrew Parkhurst	113,885	13.6	+9.7
Conservative	Daniel Boucher, Craig Lawton, Fay Jones, Tomos Davies	54,587	6.5	−10.9
Green	Anthony Slaughter, Ian Chandler, Ceri Davies, Duncan Rees	52,660	6.3	+1.8
UKIP	Kristian Hicks, Keith Edwards, Thomas Harrison, Robert McNeil-Wilson	27,566	3.3	−24.3
Change UK	Jon Owen Jones, June Davies, Matthew Paul, Sally Anne Stephenson	24,332	2.9	N/A
Turnout		836,195	37.1	+5.6

The Wales electoral region is broken down into 22 local council areas.

District	Turnout		Plaid		Brexit		Lib Dem		Labour		Green		Conservative		UKIP		Change UK		Lead	
District	#	%	#	%	#	%	#	%	#	%	#	%	#	%	#	%	#	%	#	%
Anglesey	20,576	40.7%	7.144	34.7	6,791	33.0	1,603	7.8	1,890	9.2	941	4.6	1,157	5.6	668	3.2	382	1.9		1.7%
Blaenau Gwent	15,185	30.4%	2,072	13.6	5,995	39.5	1,058	7.0	3,679	24.2	646	4.3	454	3.0	806	5.3	475	3.2		15.3%
Bridgend	34,465	32.6%	5,219	15.1	12,318	35.7	4,071	11.8	6,355	18.4	1,895	5.5	2,111	6.1	1,261	3.7	1,235	3.6		17.3%
Caerphilly	42,387	32.9%	7,548	17.8	15,808	37.3	3,795	9.0	8,354	19.7	2,302	5.4	1,552	3.7	1,846	4.4	1,182	2.8		17.7%
Cardiff	99,368	42%	20,047	20.2	21,077	21.2	20,799	20.9	17,297	17.4	8,405	8.5	6,393	6.4	2,164	2.2	3,204	3.2		0.3%
Carmarthenshire	57,823	41.8%	18,040	31.2	19,004	32.9	4,598	8.0	7,263	12.6	2,853	4.9	2,839	4.9	1,855	3.2	1,371	2.4		1.7%
Ceredigion	23,965	45.7%	8,908	37.2	6,471	27.0	3,915	16.3	1,231	5.1	1,638	6.8	896	3.7	578	2.4	328	1.4		10.2%
Conwy	33,882	38.6%	6,784	20.0	12,131	35.8	4,442	13.1	3,439	10.1	1,976	5.8	3,001	8.9	1,168	3.4	941	2.8		15.8%
Denbighshire	26,982	37%	4,910	18.2	9,168	34.0	3,335	12.4	3,682	13.6	1,654	6.1	2,572	9.5	961	3.6	700	2.6		15.8%
Flintshire	41,089	35.7%	4,396	10.7	15,613	38.0	5,944	14.5	6,428	15.6	2,579	6.3	3,260	7.9	1,483	3.6	1,386	3.4		22.4%
Gwynedd	35,440	43.1%	18,009	50.8	7,886	22.3	2,244	6.3	2,761	7.8	1,826	5.2	1,335	3.8	866	2.4	513	1.4		28.5%
Merthyr Tydfil	12,610	29%	2,023	16.0	4,407	34.9	1,090	8.6	3,235	25.7	390	3.1	373	3.0	611	4.8	481	3.8		9.2%
Monmouthshire	30,201	43.6%	3,264	10.8	9,978	33.0	6,183	20.5	2,595	8.6	2,808	9.3	3,431	11.4	802	2.7	1,140	3.8		12.5%
Neath Port Talbot	37,244	35.5%	7,124	19.1	12,075	32.4	3,262	8.8	8,776	23.6	1,757	4.7	1,390	3.7	1,560	4.2	1,300	3.5		8.8%
Newport	34,493	32.1%	3,277	9.5	12,270	35.6	4,821	14.0	6,934	20.1	2,172	6.3	2,754	8.0	1,200	3.5	1,065	3.1		15.5%
Pembrokeshire	36,091	39.5%	5,631	15.6	13,768	38.1	4,408	12.2	4,036	11.2	2,543	7.0	3,615	10.0	1,222	3.4	868	2.4		22.5%
Powys	42,283	42.5%	5,177	12.2	14,932	35.3	10,069	23.8	3,119	7.4	2,962	7.0	3,818	9.0	1,384	3.3	822	1.9		11.5%
Rhondda Cynon Taf	54,285	32.2%	11,883	21.9	18,323	33.8	4,496	8.3	11,428	21.1	2,737	5.0	1,922	3.5	2,004	3.7	1,492	2.7		11.9%
Swansea	62,078	36.0%	9,281	15.0	19,650	31.7	9,908	16.0	11,463	18.5	4,162	6.7	3,827	6.2	1,929	3.1	1,858	3.0		13.2%
Torfaen	23,206	33.7%	2,533	10.9	9,088	39.2	2,701	11.6	4,303	18.5	1,325	5.7	1,459	6.3	1,002	4.3	795	3.4		21.0%
Vale of Glamorgan	39,897	41.6%	6,086	15.3	12,573	31.5	6,800	17.0	4,577	11.5	3,279	8.2	3,957	9.9	1,144	2.9	1,481	3.7		14.5%
Wrexham	32,627	34%	4,572	14.0	12,078	37.0	4,343	13.3	4,988	15.3	1,810	5.5	2,471	7.6	1,052	3.2	1,313	4.1		21.7%

== Estimated results by Westminster constituency ==
Parties	Seats
Brexit Party	414
Liberal Democrats	74
Labour Party	67
Scottish National Party	54
Plaid Cymru	10
Green Party	10
Conservative Party	1
Others	18
Brexit Party majority of 180
