= Richard Ashworth (politician) =

British politician

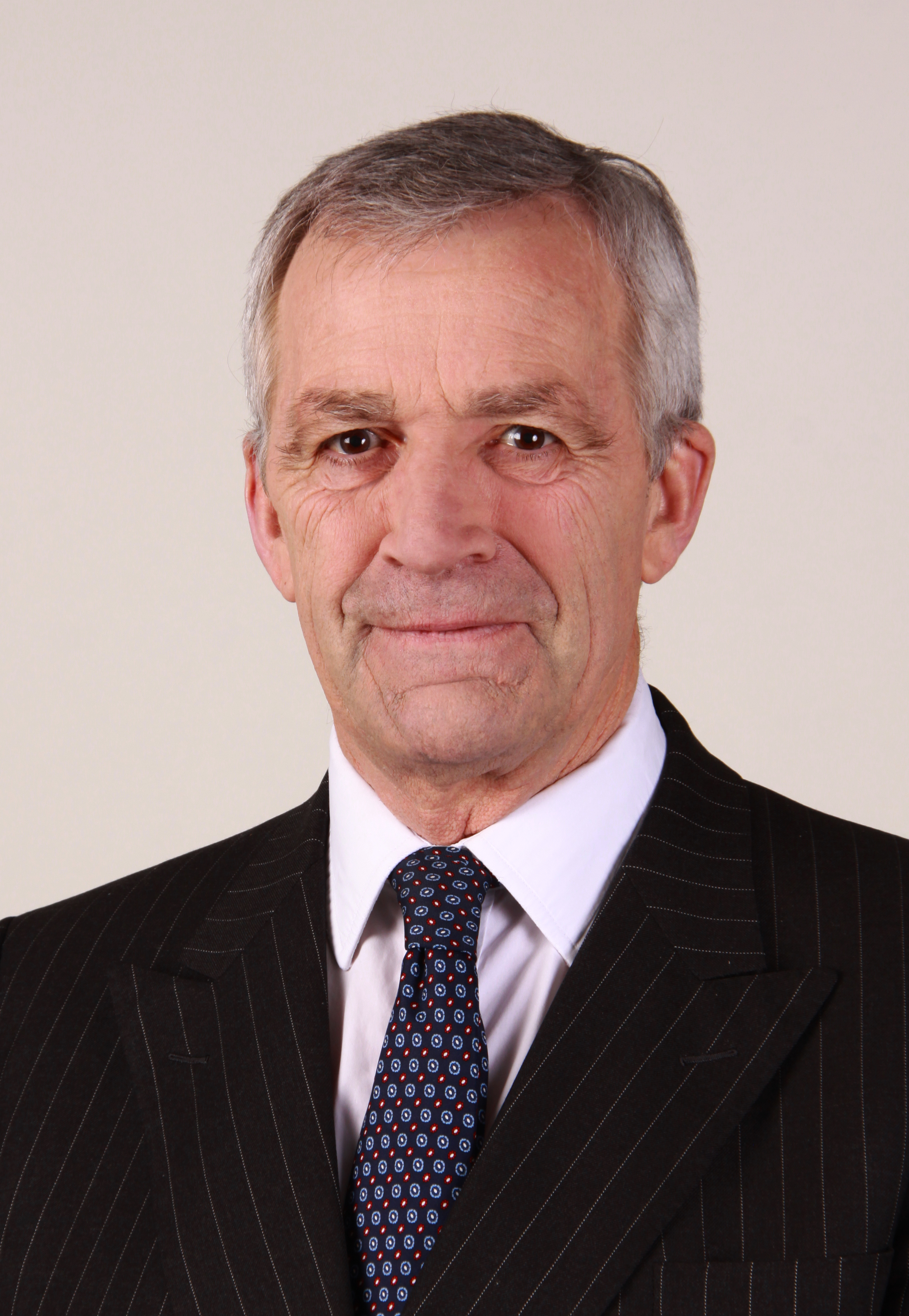
- Ashworth in 2014

Leader of the Conservatives in the European Parliament
- In office 14 March 2012 – 19 November 2013
- Preceded by: Martin Callanan
- Succeeded by: Syed Kamall

Member of the European Parliament for South East England
- In office 20 July 2004 – 1 July 2019
- Preceded by: Roy Perry
- Succeeded by: Judith Bunting

Personal details
- Born: 17 September 1947 (age 79) Folkestone, England, UK
- Party: Conservative (Before 2017); Independent (2017–2019); Change UK (2019)
- Education: Seale-Hayne College
- Website: Official website (archived); Parliament website

Richard James Ashworth (born 17 September 1947 in Folkestone) is a former British politician, who served as a Member of the European Parliament (MEP) for South East England from 2004 until 2019. He formerly sat in the European Parliament for the Conservative Party, and was that party's leader there from March 2012 to November 2013. In April 2019 Ashworth defected to Change UK, but was not elected to the European Parliament at the 2019 election held the following month.

== Background ==
Ashworth was educated at The King's School, Canterbury, and studied agriculture and management at Seale-Hayne College in Devon. He has been the chairman of a further education college (Plumpton in East Sussex) for a number of years as well as serving on several public bodies in the education sector. His interests include music, theatre, sport, aviation and country pursuits.

He was the Conservative parliamentary candidate for North Devon in 1997, and for the South East England constituency in the 1999 European Parliament election.

Before being elected in 2004, Ashworth was a dairy farmer in East Sussex for over thirty years, and during this time operated his own dairy business. He has also acted as chairman of United Milk Plc and of NFU Corporate. He was a member of the Minister of Agriculture's food chain advisory committee.

== Conservative MEP ==
He was elected to the European Parliament in 2004 and became the Conservative spokesperson on budgets. On 6 June 2008, Ashworth was appointed Conservative Chief Whip in the EP after his predecessor Den Dover was sacked following an expenses scandal. He was elected Deputy Leader of the Conservative Delegation to the European Parliament in November 2008 and Leader in 2012.

At the first stage of the Conservative Party reselection procedure ahead of the 2014 European Parliament election, he was not confirmed as going into the protected sitting members part of the ballot. This was seen as a "coup" by the right of the Conservative Party against their MEP leader, who was seen as being close to Cameron and a moderate on Europe.

Ashworth and fellow MEP Julie Girling were suspended from the Conservative Party and had the whip withdrawn on 7 October 2017, after both supported a vote in Strasbourg stating that not enough progress had been made in the first-stage Brexit negotiations to allow discussion to move onto the trade-deal phase of the talks; however, they remained in the European Conservatives and Reformists (ECR) parliamentary group. On 28 February 2018, both left the ECR group to join the European People's Party Group.

On 1 March 2018, Ashworth was one of three UK MEPs who voted against a motion to encourage national parliaments to ban "gay conversion therapies"; he issued a statement on 17 September 2018 that his vote was "a mistake which I deeply regret", and pointing to his other votes that day in support of LGBT causes.

== Change UK ==
On 16 April 2019, it was announced that he and fellow MEP Julie Girling had joined Change UK. However, Girling later declared support for the Liberal Democrats and stated that she had never actually joined Change UK. Ashworth was the first candidate on the list for Change UK in South East England at the 2019 European Parliament election, at which he failed to be elected.
