= UK European Union Party =

Pro-European British political party

- Abbreviation: UKEU Party
- Founder: Pierre Kirk
- Founded: 18 April 2019; 7 years ago
- Dissolved: 11 November 2021; 5 years ago
- Ideology: Pro-Europeanism; Cultural liberalism; Fiscal conservatism
- Political position: Centre

The UK European Union Party (UKEU Party) was a minor pro-European political party in the United Kingdom, founded by Pierre Kirk, the natural son of Pierre le Mercier duQuesnay Kirk, le Comte de Jumécourt, in the prelude to the 2019 European Parliament election in the United Kingdom. The party was founded due to a perceived weak concentration on opposing Brexit by other pro-EU parties.

The party stood candidates in three constituencies (London, North-West England, South East England) many of whom were from other EU member states. No UKEUP MEPs were elected. Kirk stood as a UKEUP candidate in the 2019 Peterborough by-election, coming 14th out of 15 candidates and winning just 25 votes.

The party was deregistered on 11 November 2021.

== Ideology ==
Aside from its strong pro-European stance, Kirk described the party as a socially liberal but fiscally conservative centrist group that endorsed policies such as improving healthcare, freedom of movement, a removal of tuition fees, and a boost to affordable housing. The party endorsed a unified EU defence force and the UK's adoption of the euro.

== Election results ==
UK Parliament by-elections
Date	Constituency	Candidate	Votes	%
6 June 2019	Peterborough	Pierre Kirk	25	0.1

European Parliament elections
Year	Votes won	% of UK Votes	Change	MEPs elected	Change
2019	33,576	0.2	New	0	Steady
Source: BBC
