= Llandrillo =

Llandrillo may refer to one of these in north Wales:

- Llandrillo, Denbighshire, a village near Corwen
  - Llandrillo railway station, closed 1965
- Coleg Llandrillo, a college in Conwy and Denbighshire
  - Grŵp Llandrillo Menai, its umbrella group
- Llandrillo-yn-Rhos, a suburb of Colwyn Bay, Conwy
