= Alan Camsell =

Oldest association football player in the world

Personal information
- Place of birth: Blaydon, County Durham, England
- Position: Goalkeeper

Team information
- Current team: Llandudno Strollers FC.
- Number: 1

Alan Camsell (born 1933) is an English-born Welsh amateur association football player who, at 92 years old, is the world's oldest active goalkeeper. He plays for Llandudno Strollers FC, a football club based in Llandudno, North Wales.

== Early life ==
Camsell was born and raised in Blaydon, County Durham, and grew up supporting Sunderland A.F.C. During his youth and early adulthood he did not participate in organised football as he worked long hours in his family's hairdressing business. In 1972, Camsell moved to Conwy, North Wales and became a teacher at Llandrillo College.

== Football career ==
Camsell did not begin playing competitive football until 1973, when he was 40 years old. He initially played as a centre forward. As he aged he transitioned into a goalkeeper in order to maintain stamina. He later joined Penrhyn Bay Strollers F.C, an over-60s football club in Llandudno. Over his five-decade amateur career Camsell outlasted his original teammates and eventually played alongside the sons and grandsons of his former colleagues, as well as two of his own grandchildren.

Camsell has gone through several medical procedures, including a total hip replacement, a knee replacement, a hernia and the implantation of a cardiac pacemaker. Despite this, Camsell continues to play weekly. To prevent injury while diving during matches, he plays with three-inch-thick foam padding around his hips.

In 2021, an internationally viral story about Camsell was published by BBC Wales, where he received attention from North American, South American, and European media. In 2023, he was nominated for the Real Football Number Ones campaign, which was launched by Sky Bet to celebrate unsung heroes of British football. He is considered one of the best examples of senior athletic longevity. In 2024, Camsell signed with Llandudno Strollers FC.
