= North Wales =

Coordinates: 52.937°N 3.659°W

North Wales Gogledd Cymru North of Wales, Northern Wales, Y Gogledd
- Geographic and statistical region
- Historical extent of North Wales (red and lighter red), Montgomeryshire (lighter red) is sometimes also considered Mid Wales. Other cultural definitions of North Wales vary. Six principal areas of Wales commonly defined to be North Wales, for statistics, policing, fire and rescue, health and regional economy.
- Sovereign state: United Kingdom
- Country: Wales
- Historic counties: List: Anglesey; Caernarfonshire; Denbighshire; Flintshire; Merionethshire; (historically Montgomeryshire)
- Principal areas: List: Isle of Anglesey; Conwy; Denbighshire; Flintshire; Gwynedd; Wrexham; (historically parts of Powys)
- Preserved counties: List: Clwyd; Gwynedd; (historically parts of Powys)
- Settlements: List: Wrexham; Deeside; Rhyl & Prestatyn; Colwyn Bay; Flint; Kinmel Bay & Abergele; Bangor; Llandudno; Holyhead

Area
  - Land: 2,383 sq mi (6,172 km^{2})

Population
  - Estimate (2018) (Note: Defined as the northern six principal areas): 698,400
  - Density: 294/sq mi (113.6/km^{2})
- Demonym(s): North Welsh, North Walian, "gogs" (informally)
- Time zone: UTC±0 (GMT)
  - Summer (DST): UTC+1 (BST)
- Postcode: LL, CH, SY

North Wales (Welsh: Gogledd Cymru [ˈɡɔɡlɛð ˈkəmrɨ]) is a geographic and statistical region of Wales, encompassing its northernmost areas. It borders mid Wales to the south, England to the east, and the Irish Sea to the north and west. The area is highly mountainous and rural, with Snowdonia National Park (Parc Cenedlaethol Eryri) and the Clwydian Range and Dee Valley (Bryniau Clwyd a Dyffryn Dyfrdwy), known for its mountains, waterfalls and trails, wholly within the region. Its population is concentrated in the north-east and northern coastal areas, with significant Welsh-speaking populations in its western and rural areas. North Wales is imprecisely defined, lacking any exact definition or administrative structure. (Note: including identity and linguistic differences) It is commonly defined administratively as its six most northern principal areas, but other definitions exist, with Montgomeryshire historically considered to be part of the region.

Those from North Wales are sometimes referred to as "Gogs" (from Welsh gogledd 'north'); in turn, those from South Wales are sometimes called "Hwntws" by those from North Wales.

The region includes the localities of Wrexham, Deeside, Rhyl, Colwyn Bay, Flint, Bangor, Llandudno, and Holyhead. The largest localities in North Wales are the city of Wrexham and the conurbations of Deeside and Rhyl/Prestatyn, where the main retail, cultural, educational, tourism, and transport infrastructure and services of North Wales are located. Bangor and St Asaph are the region's cities, Bangor is Wales's oldest city, whereas St Asaph is one of Wales's smallest and was awarded status in 2012. Wrexham, the region's largest settlement, became a city in 2022.

Since 2025, the Office for National Statistics for its International Territorial Level classification, has used a "North Wales" ITL2 region comprising the six counties.

== History ==
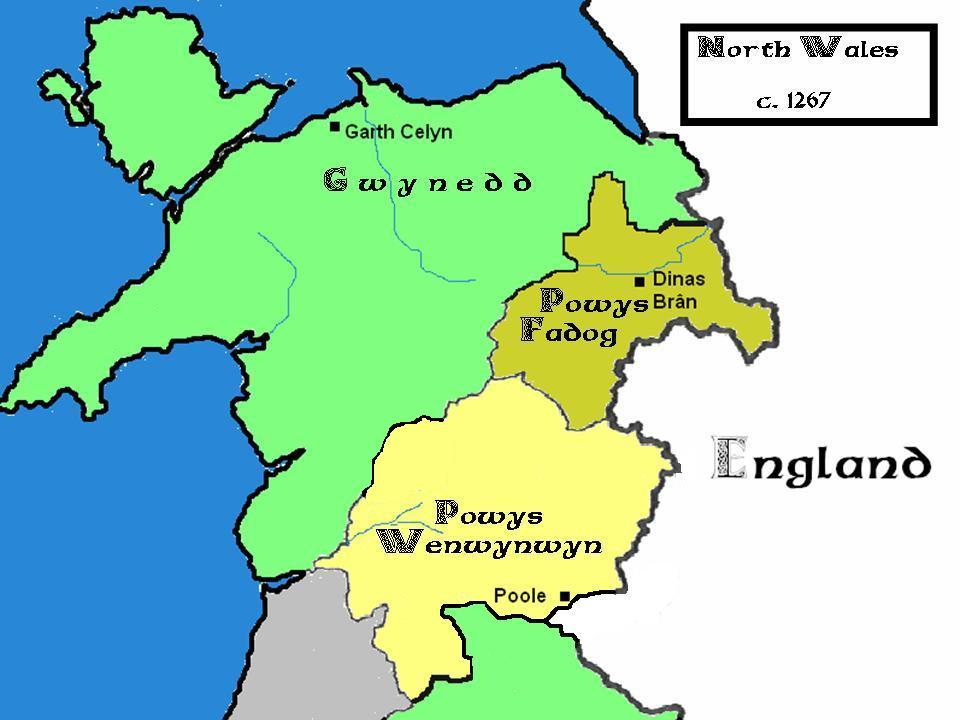
Principalities of North Wales, between 1267–76

Historically, for most of North Wales, the region can be referred to as simply "Gwynedd", (Note: Especially, North West Wales. Some borderlands of Wrexham and Flintshire were historically part of Powys Fadog or England.) named after one of the last independent Welsh kingdoms, the Kingdom of Gwynedd. This has led to a stronger sense of Welsh identity and home to more Welsh-language speakers, especially in North West Wales, than the rest of Wales. The term "North Wales" is rarely applied to all of Wales during the Anglo-Saxon invasion of Britain and the period of the Heptarchy, to distinguish it from "West Wales", known today as Cornwall, although the term "Wales" or the names of the various petty kingdoms of Wales (Gwynedd, and Powys in North Wales) are more commonly used to depict the region during this time.

The region is steeped in history, being a crucial component in Welsh medieval history, and was from the 5th to the 12th/13th centuries under the control of the influential Welsh kingdoms of Gwynedd, and Powys following the end of Roman rule in Britain. The Kingdom of Gwynedd controlled the majority of what is now the commonly defined 6 counties of North Wales, including all of the North Wales coast, with Powys retaining control over what is modern Powys, and parts of Wrexham and Flintshire, in addition to part of Shropshire. Through their over 800 year existences', their rulers acclaimed themselves to be the "King(s) of the Britons", and Gwynedd would lead the charge in the subsequent formation of the Principality of Wales. The mountainous stronghold of Snowdonia formed the nucleus of that realm and would become the last redoubt of independent Medieval Wales — only overcome in 1283 by English forces under Edward I. To this day it remains a stronghold of the Welsh language and a centre for Welsh national and cultural identity.

=== World Heritage & Biosphere Sites ===
The area is home to three of the four UNESCO World Heritage Sites in Wales. These are Pontcysyllte Aqueduct and Canal, the Slate Landscape of Northwest Wales and, collectively, the Edwardian castles and town walls of the region which comprise those at Caernarfon, Beaumaris, Conwy and Harlech. It also shares with Powys and Ceredigion the distinction of hosting the only UNESCO Biosphere (from Man and Biosphere (MAB) Programme to promote sustainable development) reserve in Wales, namely, Biosffer Dyfi Biosphere. London has only one more site than North Wales.

== Definition ==
There is no generally agreed definition of the boundaries and status of North Wales are undefined, and the boundary of North Wales with South or Mid Wales differs between organisations. It is strongly used culturally for comparison to the more urban South Wales. The most common definition for statistical and administrative purposes of North Wales consists of the six principal areas of: Isle of Anglesey, Conwy, Denbighshire, Flintshire, Gwynedd, and Wrexham. These have a combined estimated population in 2018 of 698,400 people. Under this definition, the area borders the principal areas of Ceredigion, Powys, and the rest of Wales to the south, England and its counties of Shropshire, and Cheshire to the east, and the Irish Sea to the north and west. Other definitions, especially historical, commonly include Montgomeryshire, one of the historic counties of Wales, to be part of North Wales, although as part of Powys it is more commonly considered Mid Wales today. The definitions of North and Mid Wales constantly overlap, with Meirionnydd (southern part of the modern principal area of Gwynedd) sometimes considered Mid Wales.

Since 2025, the Office for National Statistics for its International Territorial Level classification, has used a "North Wales" ITL2 region comprising the six counties, or specifically the four ITL3 regions of Isle of Anglesey, Gwynedd, Conwy and Denbighshire, and Flintshire and Wrexham.

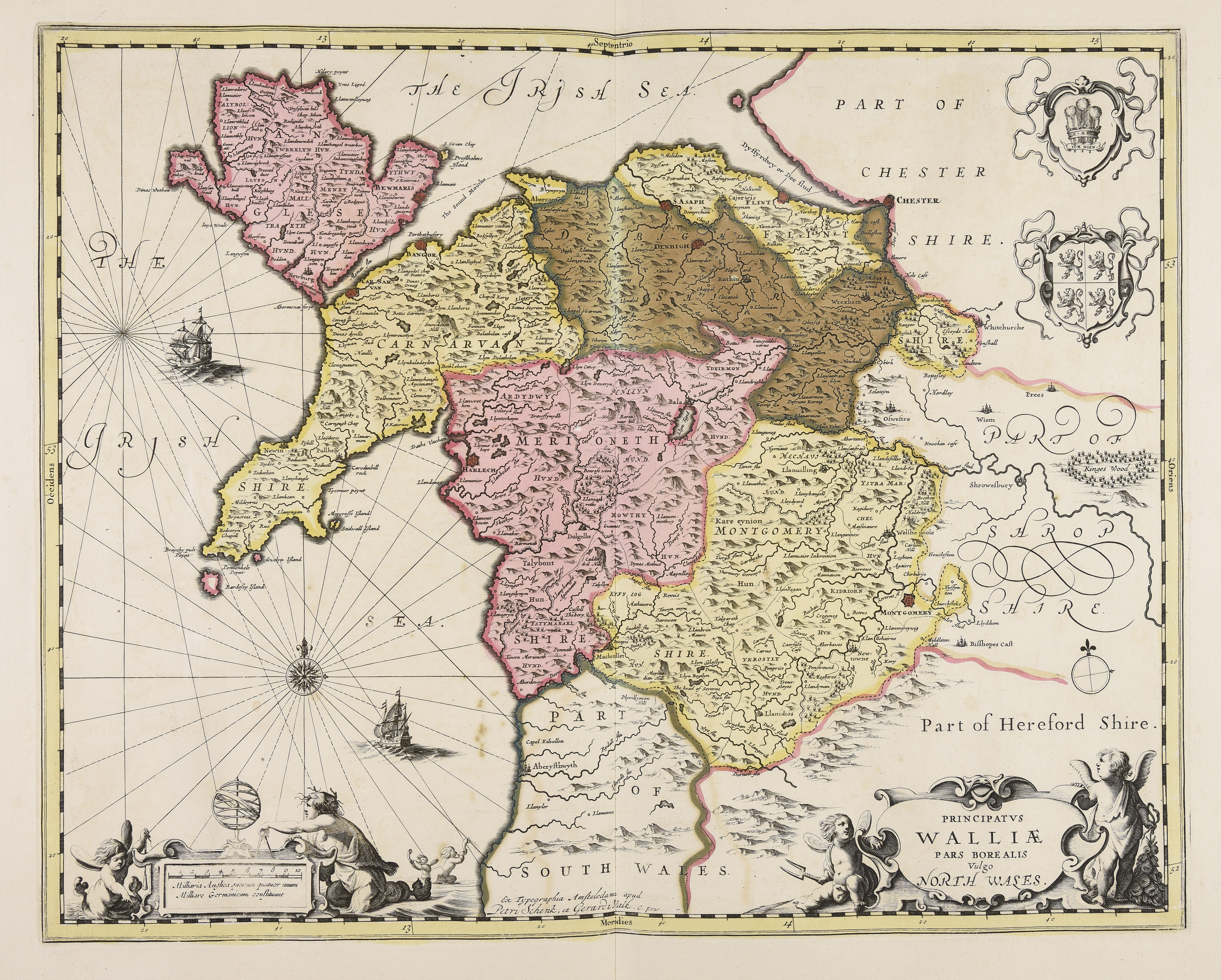
17–18th century map of North Wales

=== Capitalisation ===
North Wales may also be spelled as 'north Wales' with a lower case 'n' for north, coined as the "to cap or not to cap" debate. It is argued that using a lower case 'n' is to be only used to signify "north" as merely a geographic identifier, and a capital 'N' to distinctly separate the region for cultural, organisational, or statistical purposes from the rest of Wales. Such usage may follow ideological lines, with North Wales used to promote the region as a distinct entity separate from the rest of Wales, whilst north Wales is merely the northern bit of Wales. Organisations which administer the region together with the rest of Wales, may prefer to use a lower case for "north"; whilst organisations only operating in the region either alone or separately from the rest of Wales may use a capitalised N. Local newspapers, such as the Daily Post describe themselves as a "capper", capitalising the 'N', whereas other organisations such as BBC News may use a lower case. The Welsh Government's style guide uses lowercase, whereas Visit Wales uses capitalised. David Williams, chairman of the North Wales Business Club, announced his support for capping the term "North", saying that North Wales should be a "very recognisable region in our own right".

=== Principal areas ===
For local administration purposes, the region is most commonly made up of the following six principal areas: the Isle of Anglesey, Conwy County Borough, Denbighshire, Flintshire, Gwynedd, and Wrexham County Borough.

These principal areas are commonly divided into two groups, used for local news (e.g. BBC), regional tourism boards, town and country planning, and were the proposed replacements to the existing 6 principal areas before proposals were scrapped in 2019. They are:

1. North East Wales (Denbighshire, Flintshire, Wrexham), and
2. North West Wales (Anglesey, Conwy, Gwynedd).

However a North Central Wales (Conwy and Denbighshire) grouping has been occasionally used, specifically for health administration.

The population, density and areas are estimates for 2025 from the Office for National Statistics.

| Principal area | Created | Population | Density (/km^{2}) | Area (km^{2}) | Style |
|---|---|---|---|---|---|
| Flintshire | 1996 | 155,954 | 355 | 440 | County |
| Wrexham | 1996 | 137,977 | 274 | 504 | County borough |
| Gwynedd | 1974 | 120,295 | 47 | 2,535 | County |
| Conwy | 1996 | 114,421 | 102 | 1,126 | County borough |
| Denbighshire | 1996 | 98,247 | 117 | 837 | County |
| Isle of Anglesey | 1996 | 68,607 | 96 | 712 | County |
| North Wales | 2021 | 695,501 | 113 | 6,154 | Region |

=== Historical divisions ===
In addition to the six principal areas, North Wales is also divided into the following preserved counties for various ceremonial purposes: Clwyd (comprising Conwy, Denbighshire, Flintshire and Wrexham), and Gwynedd (comprising Gwynedd and Isle of Anglesey) The preserved counties are based on the counties created by the Local Government Act 1972 and were used for local government purposes (with county councils) between 1974 and 1996. During this period up to the present, Montgomeryshire remained a part of Powys.

Prior to the preserved counties, there were counties, now referred to as historic counties. These are the oldest of the counties of North Wales, used for centuries. North Wales contained six historic counties: Anglesey, Caernarfonshire, Denbighshire, Flintshire, Merionethshire, and Montgomeryshire. The most notable difference between these six counties and the present six (seven with Montgomeryshire) is that Caernarfonshire and Merionethshire were combined into one principal area, initially called 'Caernarfonshire and Merionethshire' until a day after its formation where it took the name Gwynedd instead, and the formation of two county boroughs, Conwy carved out of Caernarfonshire and Denbighshire, and Wrexham carved out of Denbighshire and Flintshire.

Although the boundaries of local kingdoms or principalities fluctuated, the north of Wales was divided into three regions during the Middle Ages:

- Upper Gwynedd (or Gwynedd above the Conwy), defined as the area north of the River Dyfi and west of the River Conwy
- Lower Gwynedd (or Gwynedd below the Conwy), also known as the Perfeddwlad ("the middle country") and defined as the region east of the River Conwy and west of the River Dee; and
- Ynys Môn (or Anglesey), a large island off the north-west coast.

English Maelor, currently part of Wrexham County Borough, located east of the River Dee, was (as the name suggests) part of England during a significant part of this period.

=== Electoral divisions ===
North Wales is electorally divided into constituencies and electoral wards to elect local representatives to multiple layers of government.

==== Parliamentary constituencies ====
Since 2026, four Senedd (Welsh Parliament; Welsh: Senedd Cymru) constituencies have covered North Wales: Bangor Conwy Môn, Clwyd, Fflint Wrecsam, and Gwynedd Maldwyn.

Before the May 2026 Senedd election, there were eleven constituencies used for the Senedd that covered North Wales: Aberconwy, Alyn and Deeside, Arfon, Clwyd South, Clwyd West, Delyn, Dwyfor Meironnydd, Montgomeryshire (if considered North Wales), Vale of Clwyd, Wrexham and Ynys Môn. Additionally there was an electoral region for the Senedd, used to share the name "North Wales", yet it did not cover all of North Wales. The rest of North Wales was covered by the Mid and West Wales Senedd electoral region.

Since 2024, there are eight UK Parliament constituencies: Alyn and Deeside, Bangor Aberconwy, Clwyd East, Clwyd North, Dwyfor Meirionnydd, Montgomeryshire and Glyndŵr (if considered North Wales), Wrexham and Ynys Môn.

Between 1979 and 1994, all of North Wales (including Montgomery) was a single European Parliament constituency (EPC), the North Wales European Parliament Constituency. In 1994, minor border changes put parts of Montgomeryshire in the neighbouring Mid and West Wales constituency. In 1999, both of the constituencies ceased, when it was absorbed into the larger Wales constituency until 2020 when it was subsequently abolished following the United Kingdom's withdrawal from the European Union on 31 January 2020.

=== Border to the south ===
The division with the rest of Wales is arbitrary and depends on the particular use being made. For example, the boundary of North Wales Police differs from the boundary of the North Wales area of the Natural Resources Wales and the North Wales Regional Transport Consortium (Taith). The historic boundary follows the pre-1996 county boundaries of Merionethshire and Denbighshire which in turn closely follow the geographic features of the River Dyfi to Aran Fawddwy, then crossing the high moorlands following the watershed until reaching Cadair Berwyn and then following the River Rhaeadr and River Tanat to the Shropshire border. The most common definition is that North Wales ends at the peripheries of the northern 6 principal areas, therefore the border is between Wrexham - Powys, Denbighshire - Powys, Gwynedd - Powys, and Gwynedd - Ceredigion (over the River Dyfi).

== Geography ==
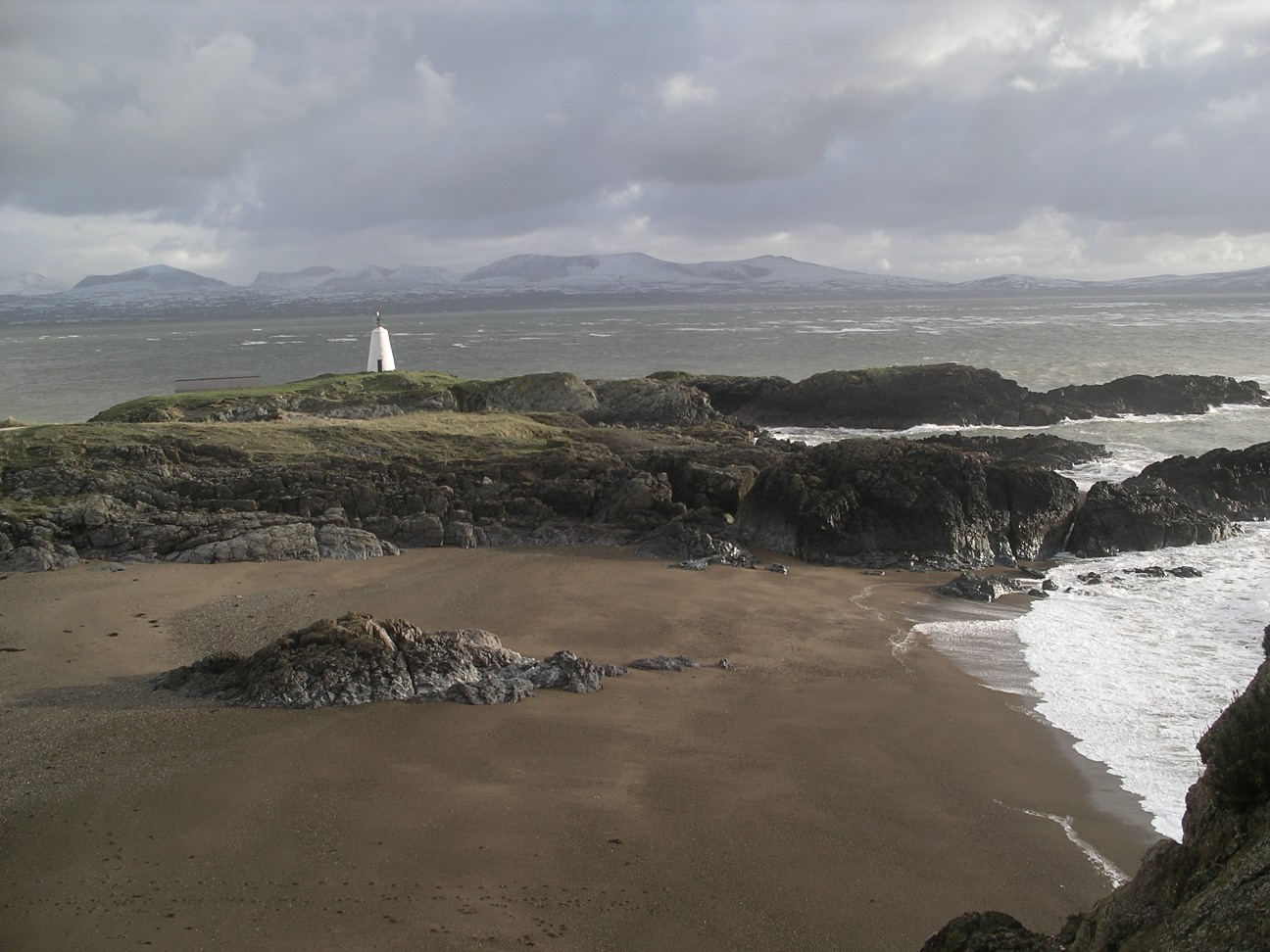
Llanddwyn Island's old lighthouse; Snowdonia in background

The area is mostly rural, with many mountains and valleys. This, in combination with its coast (on the Irish Sea), means tourism is the principal industry. Farming, which was once the principal economic force in the area, is now much reduced in importance. The average income per capita of the local population is the lowest in the UK.

The eastern part of North Wales contains the most populous areas, with more than 300,000 people living in the areas around Wrexham and Deeside. Wrexham, with a population of 65,692 at the 2011 census in its built-up area, is North Wales's largest city. The total population of North Wales is 696,300 (2017). The majority of other settlements are along the coast, including some popular resort towns, such as Rhyl, Llandudno, Pwllheli, Prestatyn and Tywyn. There are two cathedral cities: Bangor and St Asaph; and a number of medieval castles (e.g. Criccieth, Dolbadarn, Dolwyddelan, Harlech, Caernarfon Castle, Beaumaris, Conwy). The area of North Wales is about 6,172 square kilometres.

The highest mountain in Wales is Snowdon (Yr Wyddfa), in northwest Wales.

== Transport ==
=== Roads ===
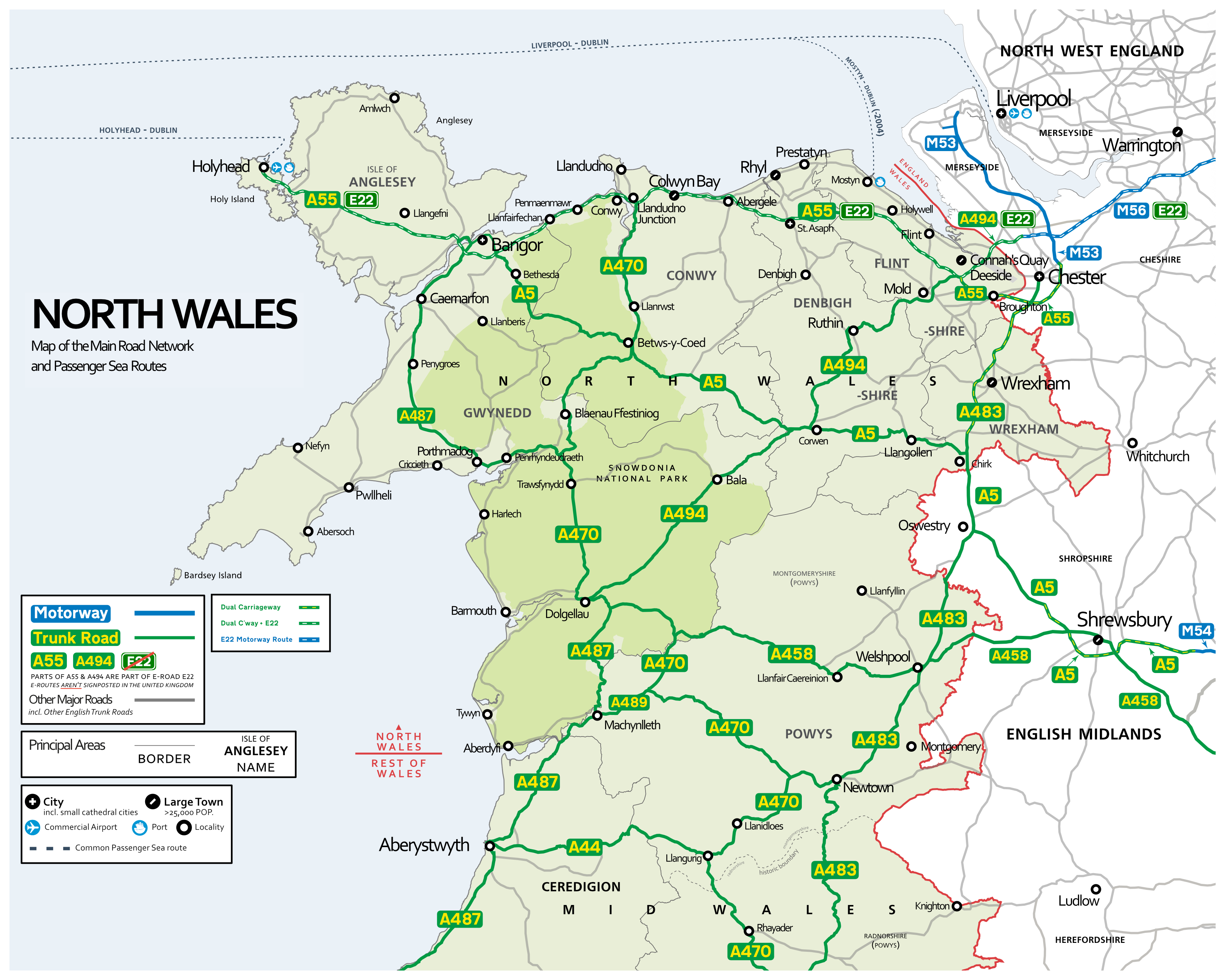
Map of the roads and sea routes in North Wales

North Wales does not have any motorways, with the only motorways in Wales being present in South Wales, and the nearest motorways (M53 and M56) being on the other side of the Wales-England border. There have been proposals to upgrade the A55 into a motorway or have more motorway-like features. Trunk roads in the region are maintained by the North and Mid Wales Trunk Road Agent (NMWTRA).

The main roads spanning across North Wales mostly span east to west, especially along the North Wales coast. This is mainly due to the mountainous terrain in the middle of Wales, meaning that most north-south connections are slower, leading to diversions onto north-south roads in England. The emphasis on east-west roadways has led to North Wales having closer connections with North West England (centred on Liverpool and Manchester) rather than with South Wales.

The busiest road in North Wales is the A55, the "North Wales Expressway", a dual carriageway primary road connecting Chester to Holyhead, along the North Wales coast and passing Deeside, Llandudno Junction, Conwy, and Bangor. It is described as the economic lifeline for North Wales, and the second most important road in all of Wales, only to the M4 in South Wales. The road connects all the way to the Port of Holyhead following an extension in 2001, which provides ferry connections to the Republic of Ireland. The majority of the road is part of the E-road network as E22 (until Ewloe, where it goes along the A494 into England), and is a dual carriageway, grade-separated, for its entire 88-mile length.

A historically important road in the region is the A5, a major road that was the primary link between the region and London (as the "London-Holyhead Trunk Road"). The road crosses the Menai Suspension Bridge and is regarded as a more scenic route, with its historical importance as a connection between London and the Port of Holyhead superseded by the A55. Other roads transiting North Wales, from east to west include the A458 from Halesowen to Mallwyd, and the A494 from Dolgellau to Saughall (originally to Birkenhead).

The busiest north-south road travelling through the region is the A483 from Chester (originally from Manchester) through Wrexham and into England near Oswestry, before re-entering Montgomeryshire and passing Welshpool and Newtown, before continuing onto Swansea. Other major north-south roads include the single-carriageways of the A470 from Llandudno to Cardiff via the Conwy valley, and the A487 from Bangor to Haverfordwest via Caernarfon and Snowdonia.

=== Sea ===
The Port of Holyhead, on the isle of Anglesey, is the main commercial and ferry port in North Wales. The port had the third-largest volume of freight traffic, in Wales, in 2018 (5.2 million tonnes), after Milford Haven and Port Talbot, and it is the main port for freight and sea passenger transport with the Republic of Ireland, handling more than 2 million passengers each year. 81% of freight traffic going through Welsh ports to the Republic of Ireland, and 75.5% of sea passenger traffic between Wales and the Republic of Ireland went through Holyhead in 2018. Historically, there were two routes between Holyhead and the Irish ports of Dublin and Dun Laoghaire. The route to Dun Laoghaire was the most popular in 1998 with over 1.7 million passengers ferried, however following a consistent decline in passenger traffic, it was removed in 2015. The other route to Dublin saw an overall increase in passenger numbers from just over 1 million in 1998 to just over 1.9 million in 2018, an increase of 82%.

A Mostyn-Dublin ferry service once existed, on the now Liverpool-Dublin route, attracting a peak of 48,000 passengers in 2003, before being discontinued in 2004.

=== Rail ===
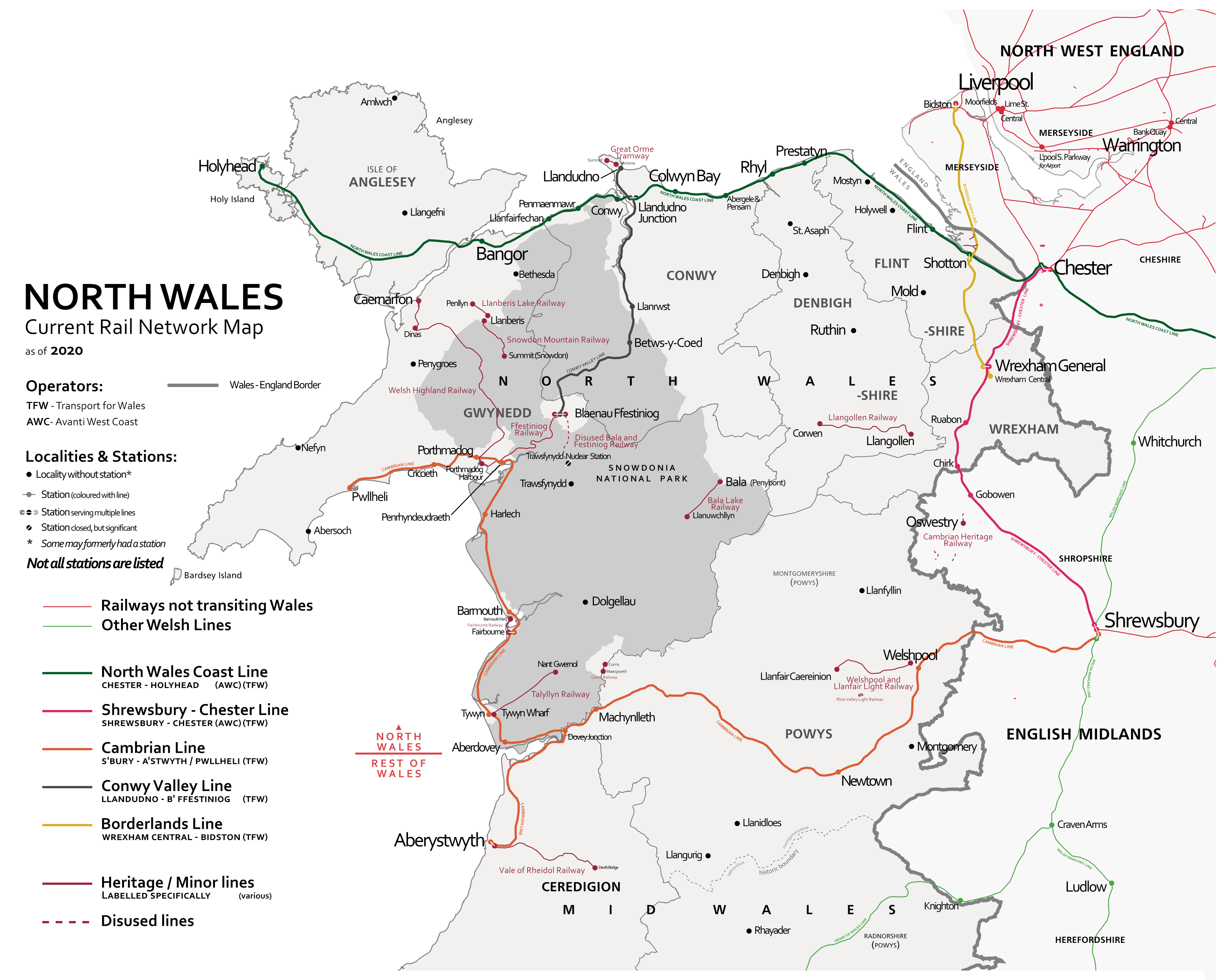
Map of rail lines in North Wales

The public rail network of the region is largely split into two sections. These sections are centred around the two main west-east railway lines transversing the region, as there are currently no north-south railway lines wholly in the region. This is largely due to the mountainous regions of Snowdonia resting between the two lines, and low passenger numbers of north-south lines leading to their closure. The public rail network is managed and maintained by Network Rail. Historically, the region had a more extensive rail network with more interconnectivity of the current lines and more connections to the south. However, due to falling passenger numbers, the emergence of automobiles and other factors, the region's railways came under review, resulting in the Beeching cuts to the network. Many former rail corridors of the once more extensive network were superseded by road infrastructure. The numerous heritage railways scattered across the region serve as a reminder of the former railways across the region.

The majority of lines operated in Wales are part of the Wales & Borders franchise, the current operator is Transport for Wales Rail, a Welsh-Government owned company, although some services (from Holyhead and Wrexham) are operated by the West Coast Partnership operator, Avanti West Coast on services using the West Coast Main Line to London Euston.

According to StatsWales, the number of rail journeys across the 6 principal areas of North Wales, made in 2017-18 was 1.4 million, an increase of 20,525 from 2007-8. The largest share of these rail journeys, at 38.4%, was within the boundaries of Gwynedd. Conwy was the principal area which saw the greatest increase in rail journeys as a percentage of journeys over the ten-year period, at 22.5%. The least amount of rail journeys in 2018-19 was in Anglesey.

As of 2025, there as 66 rail stations within the boundaries of the 6 northern principal areas, of which 2 are among the 20 busiest stations in Wales, Rhyl, and Bangor. 41 of the rail stations are stations of the North Wales lines, whereas the remaining 25 are stations of the Mid Wales lines, specifically the Cambrian Line. There is a total of 5 rail routes in North Wales: the North Wales Coast Line, the Shrewsbury—Chester Line, the Conwy Valley Line, the Borderlands Line (all part of the North Wales lines) and the Cambrian Line. All 5 routes together in 2023-24 had approximately 5,657,746 entries and exits through the 66 stations.

Five most used rail stations in North Wales (2023-24)
| Station | Welsh name | Entries & Exits | Welsh top 20 station | Line |
|---|---|---|---|---|
| Bangor | Bangor | 697,246 | Yes | North Wales Coast |
| Wrexham General | Wrecsam Cyffredinol | 629,948 | Yes | Borderlands, Shrewsbury—Chester |
| Rhyl | Rhyl | 566,794 | Yes | North Wales Coast |
| Llandudno | Llandudno | 397,446 | Yes | North Wales Coast |
| Llandudno Junction | Cyffordd Llandudno | 353,042 | No | Conwy Valley, North Wales Coast |

Five least used rail stations in North Wales (2023-24)
| Station | Welsh name | Entries & Exits | Line |
|---|---|---|---|
| Pensarn | Pen-sarn | 1,162 | Cambrian Coast |
| Tygwyn | Tygwyn | 986 | Cambrian Coast |
| Llandecwyn | Llandecwyn | 834 | Cambrian Coast |
| Pont-y-Pant | Pont-y-Pant | 814 | Conwy Valley |
| Roman Bridge | Pont Rufenig | 680 | Conwy Valley |

The North Wales Coast Line, the main rail line serving the north Wales coast, and connecting with Irish Ferries and Stena Line ferry services to Dublin Port in the Republic of Ireland. The Conwy Valley Line branches off at Llandudno Junction, heading north to Llandudno and south to Blaenau Ffestiniog. The Shrewsbury—Chester line, connects Chester and Shrewsbury via Wrexham, providing the main north Wales and south Wales connection. A former open-access operator Wrexham & Shropshire, used to provide a Wrexham General—London Marylebone service until 2011. The Borderlands Line, intersects the Shrewsbury—Chester line at Wrexham General, branching south to Wrexham Central (where it terminates), and north to Bidston (Birkenhead), and the North Wales Coast Line at Shotton. Bidston connects to the Wirral line, providing Merseyrail services, west to West Kirby, and east to Liverpool Central. The Cambrian Line forms the other west-east line in the region (as the Mid-Wales line), it connects Shrewsbury, westwards with Mid Wales and towns along Cardigan Bay. The line is commonly split into two sections, the section from Shrewsbury to Aberystwyth is sometimes referred to as the Cambrian Main Line, with the Cambrian Coast Line, splitting off from this line at Dovey Junction, heading northwest to Pwllheli. The Welsh Marches Line connects Crewe to Newport, via Shrewsbury, with services from Holyhead usually continuing to Cardiff Central. It forms part of the North Wales South Wales service, along with the Shrewsbury—Chester, North Wales Coast Line, and South Wales Main Line. These lines form the main rail connection between North Wales and South Wales.

Chester provides the main travel connections for the North Wales Coast, as a major transport hub. As part of the North Wales Metro, from Chester (and Wrexham General at limited times), via the Halton Curve, direct trains run to Liverpool Lime Street, linking to the Merseyrail. Services to Manchester Piccadilly from Chester, via the Chester—Manchester line for Transport for Wales services, and the Mid—Cheshire line for Northern services, in addition to the Northern service to Leeds, provide North Wales's connections to Northern England. Shrewsbury provides the main travel connections for passengers from the Cambrian Line (and those commuting south from other North Wales stations), providing services, in addition to those to South Wales, through England to Crewe, Birmingham International, and Birmingham New Street, and via the Heart of Wales line, services to Llanelli.

==== Heritage and narrow gauge railway lines ====
There are numerous heritage railways in the region. Most of them are narrow-gauge. Several run on sections of historically longer lines. Heritage railways employ more than 300 people and generate over £50 million per year for the North Wales economy.

The heritage railways in the region are:

| Name | Location | Gauge | Length | Description |
|---|---|---|---|---|
| Bala Lake Railway | Bala (Penybont) to Llanuwchllyn | 600 mm (1 ft 11 5/8 in) | 4.5 miles (7.2 km) | Opened as the standard gauge Ruabon–Barmouth line in 1859, closed in 1948. Re-opened starting in 1966. |
| Corris Railway | Corris | 2 ft 3 in (686 mm) | 1.5 miles (2.4 km) | Opened in 1859, closed in 1948. Re-opened starting in 1966. |
| Fairbourne Railway | Fairbourne to Barmouth Ferry | 12 1/4 in (311 mm) | 2 miles (3.2 km) | Opened in 1916, closed in 1940. Re-opened in 1947. |
| Ffestiniog Railway | Porthmadog to Blaenau Ffestiniog | 1 ft 11 1/2 in (597 mm) | 13.5 miles (21.7 km) | Opened in 1836, closed in 1946. Re-opened in stages between 1956 and 1981. |
| Llanberis Lake Railway | Llanberis | 1 ft 11 1/2 in (597 mm) | 2.5 miles (4.0 km) | Opened in 1971 on part of the trackbed of the Padarn Railway. |
| Llangollen Railway | Llangollen to Corwen | 4 ft 8 1/2 in (1,435 mm) | 10 miles (16 km) | Opened in 1865, closed in 1962. Re-opened in stages between 1972 and 2015. |
| Snowdon Mountain Railway | Llanberis to Snowdon summit | 800 mm (2 ft 7 1/2 in) | 4.7 miles (7.6 km) | Opened in 1896. Britain's only rack railway |
| Welsh Highland Railway | Porthmadog to Caernarfon | 1 ft 11 1/2 in (597 mm) | 25 miles (40 km) | Opened in 1922, closed in 1937. Re-opened in stages between 1997 and 2011. |
| Welsh Highland Heritage Railway | Porthmadog | 1 ft 11 1/2 in (597 mm) | 1 mile (1.6 km) | Opened in 1980. |
| Welshpool and Llanfair Light Railway | Welshpool to Llanfair Caereinion | 2 ft 6 in (762 mm) | 8 miles (13 km) | Opened in 1903, closed in 1956. Re-opened in stages between 1963 and 1981. |

Several of these lines connect to the Cambrian Line. Stations where the heritage railway uses the same station as Network Rail. At Fairbourne, the Fairbourne Railway connects to Barmouth Ferry and the Ffestiniog Railway connects at Minffordd. The Talyllyn Railway's Tywyn Wharf station is a short walk from Tywyn station on the Cambrian Line, while Welshpool on the Cambrian Line is across town from Raven Square on the Welshpool and Llanfair Light Railway.

==== Future developments ====
Many rail and bus lines of the region are part of an improvement project called the North Wales Metro or North East Wales Metro, which proposes improvements to the existing lines (specifically the Borderlands lines), improved connectivity between rail and other modes of transport, and more connections to North West England.

For the Gobowen to Oswestry line, Cambrian Heritage Railways, the line's operator, is working on reopening the line (multiple sections of line), and the Anglesey Central Railway is also proposed to be restored.

==== Tramways ====
In Llandudno, the Great Orme Tramway links to the Great Orme. It is the only remaining cable-operated street tramway in Great Britain, and one of only a few surviving in the world.

== Geology ==
North Wales has very diverse and complex geology with Precambrian schists along the Menai Strait and the great Cambrian dome behind Harlech and underlying much of western Snowdonia. In the Ordovician period much volcanism deposited a range of minerals and rocks over the northwestern parts of Gwynedd whilst to the east of the River Conwy lies a large area of upland rolling hills underlain by the Silurian mudstones and grits comprising the Denbigh and Migneint Moors. To the east, around Llangollen, to the north on Halkyn Mountain and the Great Orme and in eastern Anglesey are beds of limestone from which metals have been mined since pre-Roman times. Added to all this are the complexities posed by Parys Mountain and the outcrops of unusual minerals such as Jasper and Mona Marble which make the area of special interest to geologists.

== Demographics ==
Terms for people from the region include; North Welsh, and North Walian (also spelt as North Walean), or informally as "Gogs" from the Welsh word for North, "Gogledd". This term is mostly only used to distinguish from other parts of Wales (i.e. only used domestically in Wales), a majority of the population consider themselves as just "Welsh", and some additionally or only as "British". Communities along the Wales-England border and northern coast may identify as "English" as they are home to many of those of English ancestry.

=== Population ===
According to Statistics for Wales (StatsWales), the North Wales region, consists of the 6 northern principal areas, and statistics provided by StatsWales only include these 6 areas. In 2018, the estimated population of the region was 698,400 people. North Wales exhibits the evenest distribution of population across the local authorities of any of the 4 statistical regions of Wales, with 4 of the 6 authorities home to over 100,000 residents, Flintshire, Wrexham, Gwynedd and Conwy. Flintshire is the most populated principal area of North Wales, home to an estimated 155,600 people, with the Isle of Anglesey being the least populated with an estimated 70,000 people.

In 2018, North Wales has an estimated population density of 113.6 persons per square kilometre. Flintshire is the most densely populated of the 6 areas, at 355.6 persons per km^{2}, with Gwynedd being the least dense principal area at 49.0 persons per km^{2}. Between 2008, and 2018, the population density of North Wales grew by 2.3%, the third-highest rate of population density growth of the 4 statistical regions of Wales. Gwynedd, with 3.7% growth, had the highest population density growth rate in North Wales, whereas the Isle of Anglesey had the lowest population density growth rate at 0.1% from 2008 to 2018.

The population growth for the region between 1998 and 2018 was 6.3%, however, the rate was lower between 2008 and 2018, than in 1998 and 2008. Conwy was the area with the highest population growth rate for the two decades at 8%, with Isle of Anglesey having the smallest growth rate at just over 3%.

North Wales has an ageing population, as the proportion of residents over 65 has increased from 18.5% to 23.0%, and the proportion of the population under 15 has decreased from 19.8% to 17.8%.

==== Settlements ====
North Wales's largest settlement (locality) is Wrexham, with 65,692 people in the 2011 census. Data from the census details that North Wales has a lower number and proportion of residents living in settlements of 25,000 or more, than South East and South West Wales, but higher than Mid Wales. StatsWales attributes this to North Wales's lack of a settlement of a population higher than 100,000 people.

=== Language ===
North Wales has a distinct regional linguistic identity. Its dialect of the Welsh language differs from that of other regions, such as South Wales, in some ways: for example llefrith is used in most of the North instead of llaeth for "milk"; a simple sentence such as go upstairs now might be Dos i fyny'r grisiau rŵan in North Wales, and Cer lan y stâr nawr in South Wales. Colloquially, a person from North Wales (especially one who speaks with this dialect or accent) is known as a North Walian, or a Gog (from the Welsh gogledd, meaning "north"). There are Welsh medium schools scattered all across North Wales, ranging from primary to secondary schools.

==== Welsh-speaking population ====
According to the 2011 census, there were 204,406 Welsh-speakers aged three and over in North Wales. Data from the Annual Population Survey, stated that Gwynedd had the largest proportion of speakers in North Wales and Wales as a whole, with 75.6% of residents aged 3 and over saying they can speak Welsh. Flintshire had the lowest rate of Welsh in North Wales, with only 22.5% saying they can speak it. North Wales is the most Welsh-speaking region of the 4 statistical regions of Wales, at 41.9% of the population speaking Welsh in the year ending September 2019, up approximately 2.4% from September 2009. However, Flintshire is one of 2 principal areas in Wales where the rate of Welsh has decreased over the past decade.

== Education ==
North Wales is home to two universities, Bangor University, and Wrexham Glyndwr University. In 2018-19, in total there were 17,500 enrolments on higher education courses in North Wales, representing 13.2% of student enrolments in all of Wales. Bangor University was home to a majority, 58.3% of these enrolments, with 10,195 enrolments in 2018-19, with Wrexham Glyndwr University following with 5,895 enrolments, and further education college Grŵp Llandrillo Menai providing the remaining 1,410 enrolments.

Further education (FE) in Wales is provided by "colleges" (not to be confused with a university college), these are usually either sixth form colleges, further education colleges, or sixth forms within secondary schools. Further education colleges are the largest further education institutions in North Wales, in which, at present, there are only 2; Grŵp Llandrillo Menai, and Coleg Cambria. Both of these colleges, are amalgamations of smaller further education or sixth form colleges, and are sometimes described as "super colleges". Grŵp Llandrillo Menai is a merger of Coleg Llandrillo, Coleg Menai, and Coleg Meirion-Dwyfor, providing courses for students of the Isle of Anglesey, Conwy County Borough, Denbighshire, and Gwynedd. Coleg Cambria is a merger Deeside College and Yale College, Wrexham, providing courses for students of Denbighshire, Flintshire, and Wrexham County Borough. There are no standalone sixth form colleges (sixth form only) in North Wales, as all colleges providing sixth form courses also provide non-sixth form courses.

The other institutions providing sixth form further education in North Wales are secondary schools, which provide sixth form education themselves. Not all secondary schools in North Wales provide sixth form education, with it being common for students of a secondary school that does not provide sixth form education to study at a further education college.

Grŵp Colegau NPTC Group of Colleges, a further education college formed from the merger of Neath Port Talbot College and Coleg Powys, is the main further education college for Powys, hosting a campus in Newtown.

== Health ==
=== Healthcare service ===
The 6 counties of North Wales are all part of the Betsi Cadwaladr University Health Board (BCUHB), it is the largest of the local health boards which divide up NHS Wales services in Wales. Formed from the merger of the North Wales NHS Trust (itself a merger of North East Wales, and Conwy & Denbighshire NHS Trusts), the North West Wales NHS Trust, and the Local Health Boards of the six counties of Anglesey, Conwy, Denbighshire, Flintshire, Gwynedd, and Wrexham.

There are 3 main district general hospitals in North Wales; Ysbyty Gwynedd in Bangor, Ysbyty Glan Clwyd Hospital in Bodelwyddan, and Wrexham Maelor Hospital. Each hospital is the main centre of healthcare for the west, central, and east parts of North Wales respectively. North Wales additionally has a network of 22 acute and community hospitals, with patients commonly referred to hospitals in England for rare, more specialised treatment, unavailable under BCUHB, notably to Countess of Chester, Royal Liverpool University, and Royal Shrewsbury hospitals.

== Politics ==
The North Wales region is made up of the following six principal council areas; Isle of Anglesey, Conwy, Denbighshire, Flintshire, Gwynedd and Wrexham. These are unitary authorities which carry out almost all local government functions in their areas. In February 2021, a North Wales Corporate Joint Committee was formed to allow the six local councils in the region to collaborate in areas relating to economic well-being, strategic planning and the development of regional transport policies.

== Economy ==
According to the Annual Population Survey and Office for National Statistics, the unemployment rate of the six principal areas of North Wales was collectively 3.9% for the population aged 16 and over; the employment rate was 75.9% of those aged 16-64, and the economic inactivity rate (excluding students) for the population aged 16-64 was 17.9%.

=== North Wales Growth Deal ===
In 2016 the UK Government invited North Wales to submit a Growth Deal Bid, to "create thousands of jobs, boost the economy, improve transport and communication links, focus on renewable energy, support tourism and more". A bid was prepared by the North Wales Business Council, which consists of the Leaders and Chief Executives of the 6 councils, the Vice Chancellors of Wrexham Glyndŵr University and Bangor University the Chief Executives of Coleg Cambria and Grwp Llandrillo Menai, and North Wales Mersey Dee Business Council. In the 2018 budget Philip Hammond announced that £120M would be made available by the UK Government to support the Growth Deal. In December 2018, Ken Skates confirmed that the Welsh Government would match the UK Government funding, and also offered to match any additional funding support which the UK Government might make available. In November 2019 the Heads of Terms Agreement for the North Wales Growth Deal was signed by the representatives of the North Wales Economic Ambition Board, Alun Cairns the UK Government Secretary of State for Wales, and Eluned Morgan, Baroness Morgan of Ely on behalf of Welsh Government.

== Local media ==
=== Local newspapers ===
Two daily newspapers are published in the region. The region-wide "North Wales edition" of the Daily Post, no longer with an office since 2024, is distributed from Monday to Saturday, whilst The Leader (formerly the Evening Leader) publishes two editions for Wrexham and Flintshire and is based at the headquarters of Newsquest in Mold after NWN Media Ltd dissolved after existing since 1920.

The Leader has a circulation of 2,697, and the Daily Post has a circulation of 6,843.

Additionally, nine weekly newspapers provide local and community news:

==== Reach PLC titles ====
- Caernarfon and Denbigh Herald (Arfon and Dwyfor editions) circulation of just 184
- The Mail (Bangor/Anglesey and Holyhead/Anglesey editions)
- North Wales Weekly News (General, Colwyn Bay and Conwy Valley editions) circulation 308

==== Newsquest titles ====
- Denbighshire Free Press circulation 1,077
- The Journal (Rhyl, Prestatyn and Abergele editions) circulation 3039
- North Wales Pioneer (Llandudno and Colwyn Bay editions) circulation 1943
- Leader circulation of 2,697

The weekly Aberystwyth-based Cambrian News covers southern Gwynedd and publishes separate editions for the Arfon/Dwyfor and Meirionydd districts.

A weekly Welsh-language newspaper, Y Cymro, is published by the Cambrian News from its Porthmadog office alongside two localised Welsh titles, Y Cyfnod (Bala) and Y Dydd (Dolgellau). Yr Herald Gymraeg is distributed by Trinity Mirror as a pull-out section in the Wednesday edition of the Daily Post. There are also 24 Papurau Bro ("area papers") providing community news and generally published each month.

=== Online ===
Several hyperlocal websites in the area provide locally sourced news online. In Conwy county, BaeColwyn.com has provided Welsh language coverage of the Colwyn Bay area since 2011 and AbergelePost.com has been serving the Abergele area since 2010. Wrexham.com is a full-time operation covering Wrexham and the surrounding area, and is based at offices in Wrexham city centre. A full-time citizen-led online news site Deeside.com started in early 2013 and covers Connah's Quay, Mancot, Pentre, Shotton, Queensferry, Sealand, Broughton, Hawarden, Ewloe, Sandycroft and parts of Saltney. North.Wales was established in March 2020 serving the area.

=== Radio ===
Although no BBC local radio stations exist in Wales, the corporation's national services BBC Radio Wales and BBC Radio Cymru cover the region from their broadcasting centres in Bangor, and Wrexham. The Bangor studios produce a large number of Radio Cymru programmes with some music and feature output for Radio Wales originating from Wrexham.

Three commercial radio stations serve the area — Capital North West and Wales broadcasts local drivetime programming for Wrexham, Flintshire, Denbighshire and Conwy county as well as Cheshire and the Wirral with a Welsh language opt-out service for the former Coast FM area on 96.3 FM. Capital Cymru airs an extended local programming service, predominantly in the Welsh language, for Gwynedd and Anglesey. Across the entire region, Heart North Wales also airs local peak-time programming in English, including an extended news programme on weeknights - however studios in Gwersyllt on the outskirts of Wrexham closed in January 2025.

Three community radio stations broadcast on FM Tudno FM broadcasting to Llandudno & surrounding areas and Môn FM across the Isle of Anglesey and parts of Gwynedd. Radio Glan Clwyd - an extension of hospital service Radio Ysbyty Glan Clwyd - broadcasts on 1287 AM in the Bodelwyddan, St Asaph, Rhuddlan, Towyn and Kinmel Bay areas. Calon FM, based in Wrexham, closed in 2024.

Towards the western side of North Wales, local hills mean national BBC FM coverage can be quite poor, often suffering interference from Irish stations from the west.

=== Television ===
News coverage of North Wales is generally provided within the BBC's Wales Today, Newyddion and Ffeil programmes (the latter two broadcast on S4C) and on ITV's ITV News Cymru Wales. BBC Cymru Wales news teams are based at the corporation's Bangor studios, while ITV Cymru Wales formally ran a newsroom in Colwyn Bay.

S4C has an administrative office in Caernarfon, where a cluster of independent production companies are also based or partly based including Rondo Media, Cwmni Da, Antena, Owain Roberts Animations and Tinopolis.

== Sport ==
=== Football ===
Wrexham A.F.C. play in the English football league system; having been a member of the Football League for over 80 years, in 2008 they were relegated into the Conference National for the first time in their existence and now play in the EFL Championship. Their home ground is the Racecourse Ground in Wrexham. In November 2020, the club was purchased by Hollywood actors Rob McElhenney and Ryan Reynolds.

Several teams including Connah's Quay Nomads F.C. and Bangor City F.C. have appeared in UEFA competitions, playing within the mostly semi-professional Welsh leagues the Cymru Premier and the Cymru North.

Due to the proximity of North Wales to the North West of England, support for the English clubs of Liverpool F.C., Everton F.C. and Manchester United F.C. has been historically strong.

=== Rugby League ===
Wales was represented in the Super League by the Crusaders RL, they re-located to Wrexham for the 2010 season from South Wales. They played at the Racecourse Ground and trained at Stansty Park both in Wrexham before folding in 2011. They have now been replaced by the League 1 side, North Wales Crusaders.

North Wales has its own amateur league, in the fifth tier of the British rugby league system, the North Wales Championship.

=== Rugby Union ===
In September 2008 it was announced by the Welsh Rugby Union that a development team based in North Wales would be created, with a long-term goal of becoming the fifth Welsh team in the Celtic League. It was envisaged that this would both help the growth of the game in the area, and provide a larger pool of players for the Welsh national team to be selected from. The team was named RGC 1404.

== See also ==
- Geography of Wales
- West Wales
- Mid Wales
- North Wales Police
- North Wales Police and Crime Commissioner
- North Wales Fire and Rescue Service
