= Carmen Smith, Baroness Smith of Llanfaes =

British politician (born 1996)

The Right Honourable The Baroness Smith of Llanfaes
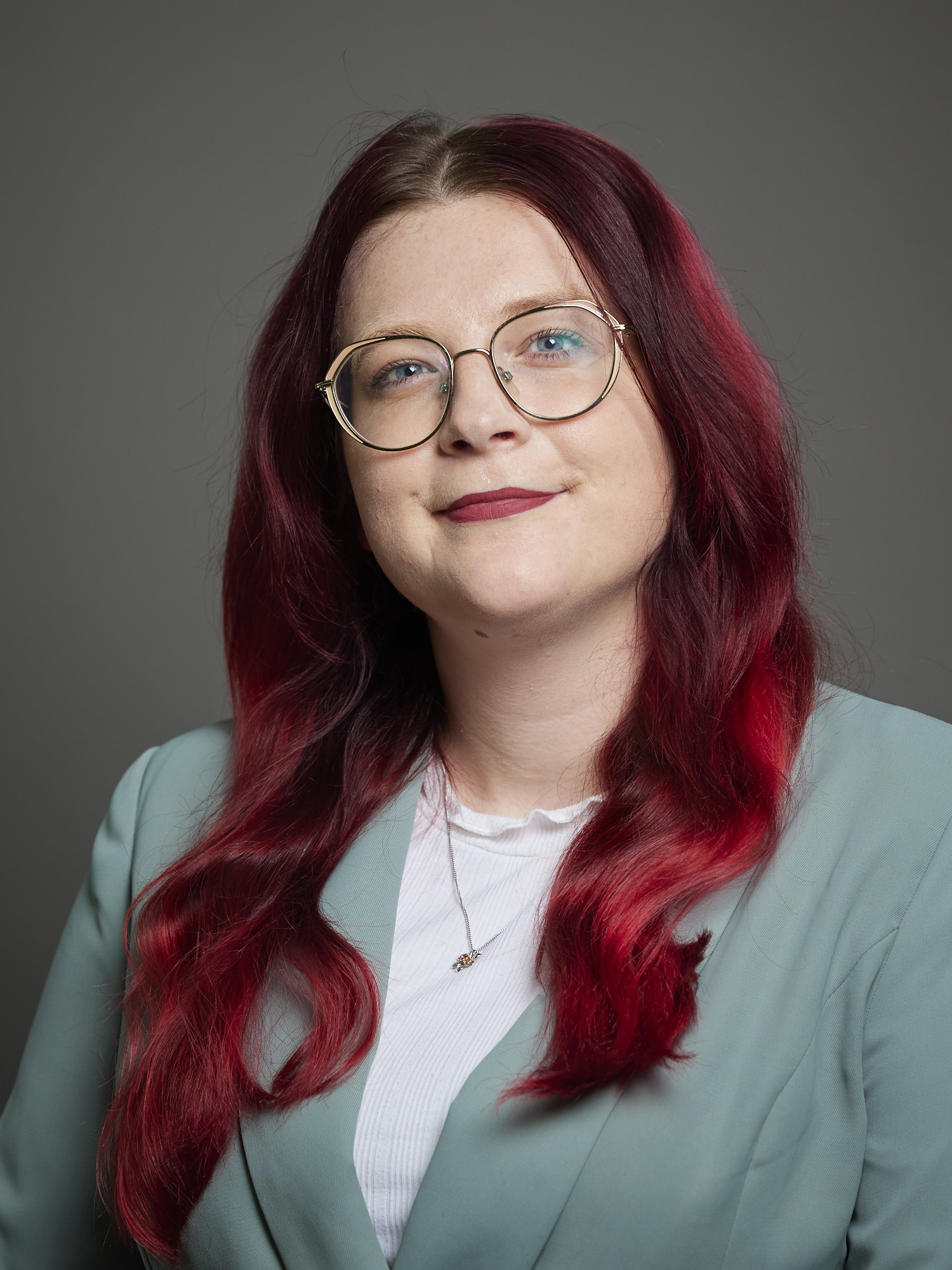
- Official portrait, 2024

Member of the House of Lords
- Lord Temporal
- Life peerage 13 March 2024

Personal details
- Born: Carmen Ria Smith; 15 March 1996 (age 30) Salisbury, England
- Party: Plaid Cymru
- Education: Ysgol David Hughes; Coleg Menai; Bangor University

Carmen Ria Smith, Baroness Smith of Llanfaes (born 15 March 1996) is a Welsh politician. She has been a member of the House of Lords for Plaid Cymru since March 2024.

== Early life ==
Smith was born on 15 March 1996 in Salisbury in Wiltshire, and moved with her family to Llanfaes on the Isle of Anglesey aged seven. She attended Ysgol David Hughes and later Coleg Menai, where she was the student union president of Grŵp Llandrillo Menai.

She was a carer to her father, who had dementia.

Smith studied law at Bangor University for one year before leaving her studies to campaign to become the deputy president of NUS Wales. She was elected to that role in 2016, and later served as acting president at the end of her term. She was also a board member of the European Students' Union.

== Career ==
After leaving NUS Wales, Smith worked for ten months as an assistant at the international development organisation United Purpose. She later worked as an eight-month temporary political researcher to Jill Evans at the European Parliament, before returning to a role at United Purpose apparently based in New York City for eight months. She then worked for Plaid Cymru in the Senedd, first as administration manager to the Plaid Cymru group, then Head of Parliamentary Affairs and Operations, and finally Acting Chief of Staff in a temporary role. She was later a public affairs officer for the renewable energy company Bute Energy since October 2023.

Smith stood in the June 2019 European Parliament election in Wales as the second candidate on the Plaid Cymru list, but was not elected. She was a campaigner for the People's Vote, advocating for a second referendum on Brexit. The same year, she unsuccessfully campaigned to become Plaid Cymru's nominee for the 2019 general election in Ynys Môn.

=== House of Lords ===
Smith was selected to be a Plaid Cymru member of the House of Lords through an internal party election after Lord Wigley announced his intention to retire in 2024; this would keep the number of Plaid Cymru peers at one. Following her nomination, Smith said that she would "[fight] for a fair deal for Wales" and "work to inspire the next generation of women to take an active role in our communities and our nation". She also said that she had a particular interest in coal tip safety. Smith disagrees with the existence of the House of Lords as an unelected chamber but said the house needs "people in there speaking up for Wales".

Following Smith's nomination to the peerage, a dispute broke out within Plaid Cymru regarding the process through which she had been selected for nomination. Unlike Labour and the Conservatives, Plaid Cymru selects its candidate for nomination via a party members' vote. While Elfyn Llwyd, a former member of Parliament, received the highest share of the 2023 members' vote, Smith was selected over Llwyd. This was a result of a Plaid Cymru National Executive Committee decision, announced in advance of the vote, that nominees for peerages would alternate between women and men. While the party had lobbied for an increase in its number of seats within the House of Lords, only one seat was available to Plaid Cymru at the time of the members' vote, and so only Smith was nominated.

Some Plaid Cymru members criticised her appointment as undemocratic and unfair, and took issue with her lack of experience compared to her rival candidates. Smith replied that the selection of a woman for nomination to the (predominately male) House of Lords is consistent with Plaid Cymru's status as a "party of equality"; and that the process through which she was elected was more democratic than the nomination process of any rival party.

Speaking on a BBC Newscast podcast with Laura Kuenssberg and Paddy O'Connell, Smith revealed that she would take "of Llanfaes" as her territorial designation. She was created Baroness Smith of Llanfaes, of Llanfaes in the County of Ynys Môn, on 13 March 2024. At the age of 27 on her appointment, Smith became the youngest member of the House of Lords, and the youngest person ever to receive a life peerage, succeeding Baroness Owen of Alderley Edge. Smith was introduced to the House of Lords on 21 March and made her maiden speech on 25 April.
