= Tudno (disambiguation) =

Tudno (fl. 6th century) was a saint in Llandudno, Wales.

Tudno may also refer to:

- Tudno (electoral ward), a district of Llandudno
- Tudno FM, a radio station serving Llandudno
