= Coleg Meirion-Dwyfor =

Multi-campus institute of further education in Gwynedd, Wales

Coordinates: 52.745°N 3.898°W

- Coleg Meirion-Dwyfor logo
- Type: Further education college
- Principal: Dr Siôn Peters-Flynn
- Location: Ffordd Ty’n y Coed, Dolgellau, LL40 2SW, North Wales, Wales, United Kingdom
- Website: www.gllm.ac.uk

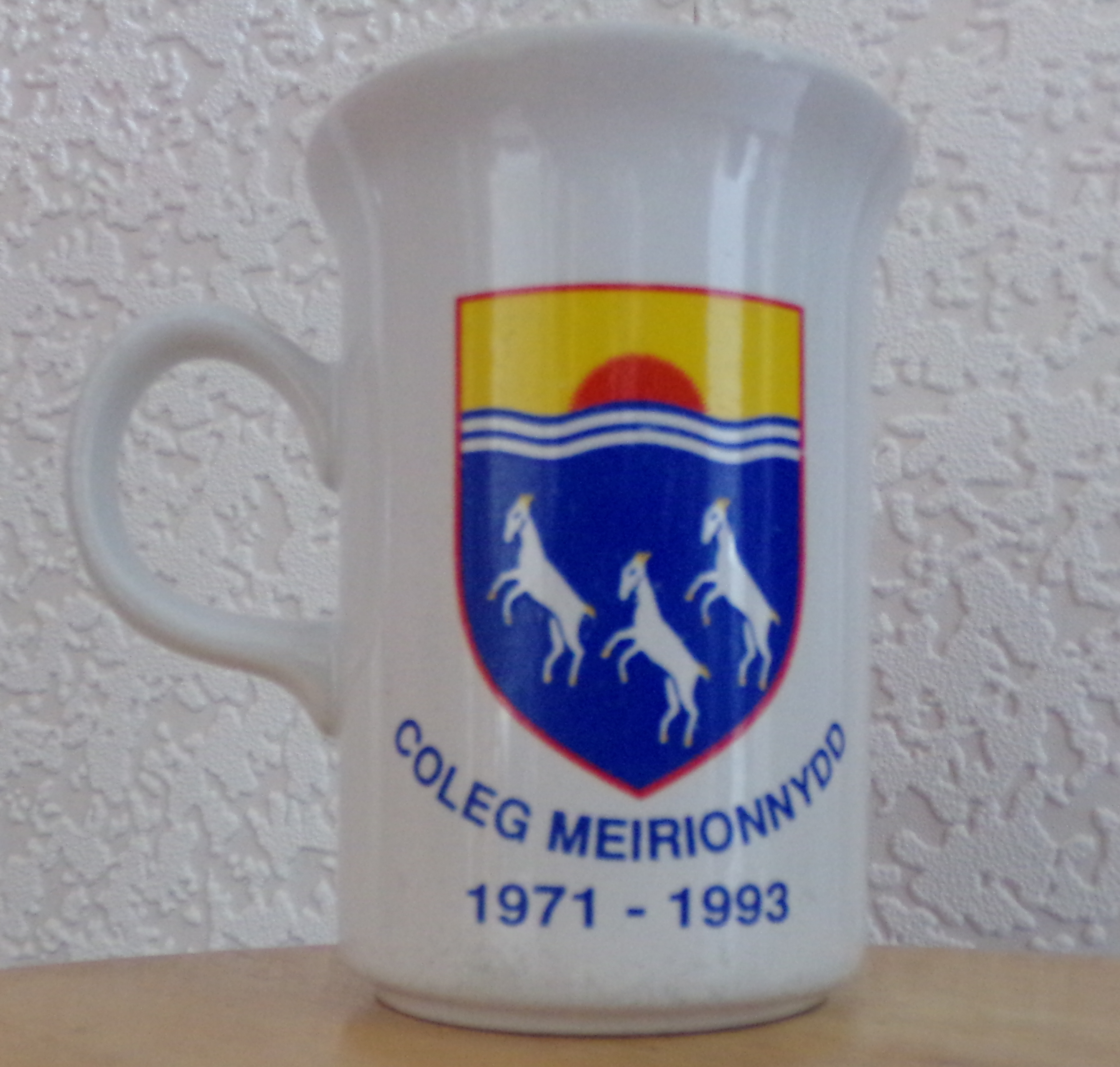
Mug bearing the college coat of arms

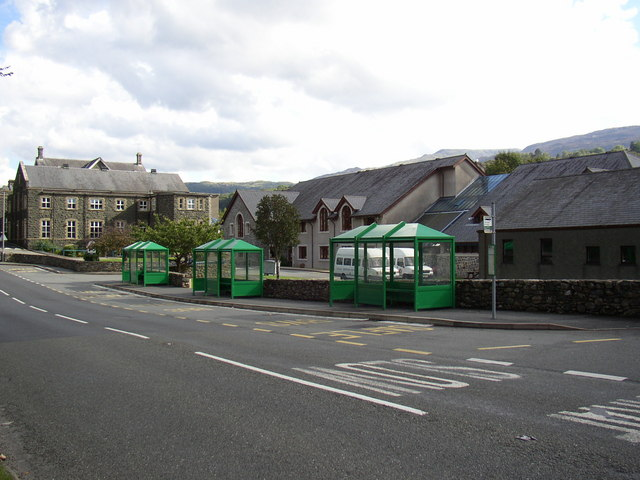
Coleg Meirion-Dwyfor

Coleg Meirion-Dwyfor (Welsh for 'Meirion-Dwyfor College'; abbreviated CMD) is a college in Gwynedd, Wales with its main campus in Dolgellau. It serves the areas of Meirionydd and Dwyfor. It has a bilingual language policy and offers the opportunity to study most subjects through the medium of Welsh. Since 1 April 2012, it has been a constituent college of Grŵp Llandrillo Menai.

Coleg Meirion-Dwyfor has three main campuses at Dolgellau in Meirionnydd, Pwllheli in Dwyfor and Glynllifon (for agricultural courses) near Caernarfon. The Dolgellau campus was previously occupied by Dr Williams School.

Notable former pupils include the singer Duffy, who was elected president of the Students' union.

Coleg Meirion-Dwyfor formally merged with Coleg Llandrillo on 1 April 2010; this new college merged with Coleg Menai in 2012 to form Grŵp Llandrillo Menai. The merged organisation is one of the largest further education colleges in the UK, located at twelve campuses across four counties. Although the colleges have merged their management and have a central administration, the Coleg Meirion-Dwyfor campuses retain the Coleg Meirion-Dwyfor name.
