= Eleanor Margolies =

Eleanor Margolies is a writer on theater and has the first Jocelyn Herbert Fellowship at the University of the Arts London, specializing in the Jocelyn Herbert Archive of stage design.

In the 2017 United Kingdom general election, Margolies stood as the London Green Party candidate for Camberwell and Peckham. In 2019, she was number 5 on the Green Party list for the London region in the European Parliament elections. Neither time was she elected.

== Selected publications ==
- Margolies, Eleanor (2016), Props, Readings in theatre practice, Palgrave, ISBN 978-1137413369
- Margolies, Eleanor (2015), "Going to hear a dance", Performance Research, 20 (6), Performance research, 20, no. 6: 17–23, doi:10.1080/13528165.2015.1111044, ISSN 1352-8165, S2CID 194207705
- Margolies, Eleanor (2014), "The Present of Memory: Théâtre Demodesastr in Performance", Performance Research, 2, Performance Research, v2 n1: 2–10, doi:10.1080/13528165.1997.10871526, ISSN 1352-8165
- Eleanor Margolies (2002), Dancing with forks : a study of objects in contemporary performance, OCLC 399699350
