= Party lists in the 2019 European Parliament election in the United Kingdom =

The 2019 European Parliament election for the election of the delegation from the United Kingdom was held on 23 May 2019. These were the last elections to the European Parliament to be held before Brexit.

Only constituencies in Great Britain used party-list proportional representation, as in Northern Ireland the single transferable vote system is used.

== Constituencies ==
12 European Parliament constituencies were used, each electing a different number of MEPs based on population:

- East Midlands (5)
- East of England (7)
- London (8)
- Northern Ireland (3)
- North East England (3)
- North West England (8)
- Scotland (6)
- South East England (10)
- South West England (6)
- West Midlands (7)
- Wales (4)
- Yorkshire and the Humber (6)

== Brexit Party ==
The Brexit Party was newly founded for the 2019 European Parliament election. On 8 February 2019, party leader Nigel Farage stated he would stand as a candidate for the party in any potential future European Parliament elections contested in the United Kingdom. MEPs Steven Woolfe and Nathan Gill, also formerly of UKIP, stated that they would also stand for the party.

=== East of England ===
The Brexit Party had a list of 7 candidates for the 7 seats available in the East of England. The top three were elected.

#	Candidate	Occupation	Elected
1	Richard Tice	Businessman and Brexit Party Party Chair	✓
2	Michael Heaver	Former chair of UKIP youth wing and press aide	✓
3	June Mummery	Businesswoman in the fishing industry	✓
4	Paul Hearn		✗
5	Priscilla Huby		✗
6	Sean Lever		✗
7	Edmund Fordham		✗

=== East Midlands ===
The Brexit Party had a list of 5 candidates for the 5 seats available in the East Midlands. The top three were elected.

#	Candidate	Occupation	Elected
1	Annunziata Rees-Mogg	Journalist	✓
2	Jonathan Bullock	Incumbent MEP since 2017	✓
3	Matthew Patten	Councillor and charity executive	✓
4	Tracy Knowles	Nominating officer of the Brexit Party	✗
5	Anna Bailey	Doctor	✗

=== South East England ===
The Brexit Party had a list of 10 candidates for the 10 seats available in the South East of England. The top four were elected.

#	Candidate	Occupation	Elected
1	Nigel Paul Farage	Incumbent MEP since 1999 Former Leader of UKIP Leader of the Brexit Party	✓
2	Alexandra Lesley Phillips	Former head of media of UKIP	✓
3	Robert Andrew Rowland	Businessman	✓
4	Belinda Claire de Camborne Lucy	Brexit Activist	✓
5	James Gilbert Bartholomew	Journalist	✗
6	Christopher Graham Ellis	Businessman	✗
7	John Kennedy	Businessman	✗
8	Matthew Peter Taylor	Businessman	✗
9	George Thomas Stahel Farmer	Hedge fund employee	✗
10	Peter David Wiltshire	Businessman	✗

=== South West England ===
#	Candidate	Occupation	Elected
1	Ann Widdecombe	Former Conservative MP for Maidstone and The Weald	✓
2	James Glancy	Television presenter and conservationist	✓
3	Christina Jordan	Nurse and charity worker	✓
4	Ann Tarr	Consultant.	✗
5	Roger Lane-Nott	Former Royal Navy officer	✗
6	Nicola Darke	Yoga instructor.	✗

== Change UK ==
The party announced on 23 April that it would stand a full slate of candidates in Great Britain for the European Parliament elections, including Ashworth, writer Rachel Johnson (sister of Conservative MPs Jo and Boris Johnson); former BBC journalist Gavin Esler; former Conservative MPs Stephen Dorrell and Neil Carmichael; former Labour MEP Carole Tongue; former Labour MPs Roger Casale and Jon Owen Jones; former Liberal Democrat MEP Diana Wallis; and the former deputy Prime Minister of Poland Jacek Rostowski. None of the Change UK candidates won any seats.

=== London ===
#	Candidate	Occupation	Elected
1	Gavin Esler	journalist, television presenter and author. Former presenter of BBC Two's flagship political analysis programme Newsnight	✗
2	Jacek Rostowski	Former Minister of Finance and Deputy Prime Minister of Poland	✗
3	Carole Tongue	Former Labour MEP for London East and former Deputy Leader of the European Parliamentary Labour Party	✗
4	Annabel Mullin	Consultant associated with the Renew Party	✗
5	Karen Newman	Vice-chair of Liberal Judaism	✗
6	Nora Mulready	Charity CEO	✗
7	Jessica Simor	Lawyer	✗
8	Haseeb Ur-Rehman	Lawyer associated with the Renew Party	✗

Ali Sadjady Naiery, a mixed martial arts fighter and former Conservative Party candidate for Ealing Borough Council, was originally placed sixth on Change UK's London list, but withdrew and was replaced after he was found to have made a tweet saying that Romanian pickpockets on the London Underground made him want Brexit.

=== South East England ===
#	Candidate	Occupation	Elected
1	Richard Ashworth	Incumbent Change UK MEP, elected as a Conservative. Former Leader of the Conservatives in the European Parliament	✗
2	Victoria Groulef	Labour Party candidate for Reading West at the 2015 general election	✗
3	Warren Morgan	Former Labour member of Brighton and Hove City Council for East Brighton	✗
4	Eleanor Fuller		✗
5	Robin Bextor	Film and television producer	✗
6	Eleanor Fuller		✗
7	Nicholas Mazzei		✗
8	Suzana Carp	Environmental campaigner	✗
9	Heather Allen		✗
10	Diane Yeo		✗

=== South West England ===
#	Candidate	Occupation	Elected
1	Rachel Johnson	Journalist, television presenter and author. Sister of Boris Johnson.	✗
2	Jim Godfrey		✗
3	Ollie Middleton		✗
4	Matthew Hooberman		✗
5	Liz Sewell		✗
6	Crispin Hunt	Musician and former member of Longpigs	✗

=== Scotland ===
#	Candidate	Occupation	Elected
1	David Macdonald	Independent councillor on East Renfrewshire Council	✗
2	Kate Forman		✗
3	Peter Griffiths		✗
4	Heather Astbury		✗
5	Colin McFadyen		✗
6	Cathy Edgeworth		✗

West Midlands (7)

Wales (4)

=== Yorkshire and the Humber ===
#	Candidate	Occupation	Elected
1	Diana Wallis	Former Liberal Democrat Member of the European Parliament	✗
2	Juliet Lodge		✗
3	Sophia Bow		✗
4	Joshua Malkin		✗
5	Rosanne McMullen		✗
6	Steven Wilson		✗

== Conservative Party ==
=== South East England ===
#	Candidate	Occupation	Elected
1	Daniel Hannan	Incumbent MEP, journalist, author and politician. Founder of Vote Leave	✓
2	Nirj Deva	Incumbent MEP and former MP for Brentford and Isleworth	✗
3	Richard Robinson	Chairman of Surrey Heath Conservatives.	✗
4	Mike Whiting	Member of Swale District Council.	✗
5	Juliette Ash	Conservative candidate for Pontypridd at the 2017 general election	✗
6	Anna Firth	Member of Sevenoaks District Council for Brasted, Chevening and Sundridge. Conservative candidate for Erith and Thamesmead at the 2015 general election	✗
7	Adrian Pepper	Consultant.	✗
8	Clarence Mitchell	Journalist, member of Reading Borough Council and former Conservative candidate for Brighton Pavilion at the 2015 general election.	✗
9	Neva Novaky	Secretary-General of the European Conservatives and Reformists group on the European Committee of the Regions	✗
10	Caroline Newton	Member of South Oxfordshire District Council	✗

=== South West England ===
#	Candidate	Occupation	Elected
1	Ashley Fox	Leader of the Conservatives in the European Parliament since 2014.	✗
2	James Mustoe	Member of Cornwall Council for Mevagissey.	✗
3	Faye Purbrick	Cabinet member on Somerset County Council.	✗
4	Claire Hiscott	Member of Bristol City Council.	✗
5	James Taghdissian	Former Conservative prospective parliamentary candidate for Cardiff West at the 2015 general election, and Exeter at the 2017 general election.	✗
6	Emmeline Owens	Member of Wandsworth London Borough Council.	✗

=== Yorkshire and the Humber ===
#	Candidate	Occupation	Elected
1	John Procter	Incumbent Member of the European Parliament	✗
2	Amjad Bashir	Incumbent Member of the European Parliament	✗
3	Michael Naughton		✗
4	Andrew Lee		✗
5	Matthew Freckleton	Tech entrepreneur.	✗
6	Sue Pascoe		✗

== English Democrats ==
The English Democrats fielded candidates in every constituency in England.

=== Yorkshire and the Humber ===
#	Candidate	Occupation	Elected
1	David Allen		✗
2	Tony Allen		✗
3	Joanne Allen		✗
4	Fiona Allen		✗

== Green Party of England and Wales ==
The Green Party of England and Wales fielded candidates in every constituency in England and Wales.

=== East Midlands ===
#	Candidate	Notes	Elected
1	Kat Boettge	Green Party candidate for Broxtowe Borough Council in 2019.	✗
2	Gerhard Lohmann-Bond		✗
3	Liam McClelland		✗
4	Daniel Wimberley		✗
5	Simon Tooke		✗

=== East of England ===
#	Candidate		Notes	Elected
1	Catherine Rowett	framless	Professor of Philosophy at University of East Anglia.	✓
2	Rupert Read	framless		✗
3	Martin Schmierer			✗
4	Fiona Radic			✗
5	Paul Jeater		Parish councillor and former candidate for Braintree (in 2015) and Brentwood and Ongar (in 2017).	✗
6	Pallavi Devulapalli		General practitioner.	✗
7	Jeremy Caddick		Dean of Emmanuel College, Cambridge.	✗

=== London ===
#	Candidate		Notes	Elected
1	Scott Ainslie	framless	Member of Lambeth Council.	✓
2	Gulnar Hasnain			✗
3	Shahrar Ali	framless	Former Deputy Leader of the Green Party of England and Wales	✗
4	Rachel Collinson			✗
5	Eleanor Margolies		Academic	✗
6	Remco van der Stoep			✗
7	Kirsten de Keyser			✗
8	Peter Underwood			✗

=== North East England ===
#	Candidate	Notes	Elected
1	Rachel Featherstone	University lecturer at Teesside University.	✗
2	Jonathan Elmer	Councillor and Green Party prospective parliamentary candidate for City of Durham in 2015, 2017 and 2019.	✗
3	Dawn Furness	Filmmaker and Green Party prospective parliamentary candidate for Blyth Valley in 2015 and 2017.	✗

=== North West England ===
#	Candidate		Notes	Elected
1	Gina Dowding	framless	Member of Lancashire County Council since 2013 and member of Lancaster City Council since 2019.	✓
2	Wendy Olsen			✗
3	Jessica Northey			✗
4	Geraldine Coggins			✗
5	Rosie Mills			✗
6	Astrid Johnson			✗
7	Daniel Jerrome			✗
8	James Booth			✗

=== South East England ===
#	Candidate		Notes	Elected
1	Alexandra Phillips	framless	Green candidate for Brighton Kemptown in 2019, Green list candidate for South East England in 2014, candidate for GPEW deputy leader in 2012.	✓
2	Elise Benjamin			✗
3	Vix Lowthion			✗
4	Leslie Groves Williams			✗
5	Phélim Mac Cafferty			✗
6	Jan Doerfel			✗
7	Larry Sanders	framless	Former Health and Social Care Spokesperson of the Green Party of England and Wales. Older brother of Bernie Sanders.	✗
8	Isabella Moir			✗
9	Oliver Sykes			✗
10	Jonathan Essex			✗

=== South West England ===
#	Candidate		Notes	Elected
1	Molly Scott Cato	framless	Economist and academic, Green candidate for Bristol West in 2017. Incumbent MEP since 2014.	✓
2	Cleo Lake			✗
3	Carla Denyer	framless	Member of Bristol City Council, future Leader of the Green Party of England and Wales	✗
4	Tom Scott			✗
5	Martin Dimery			✗
6	Karen La Borde			✗

=== Wales ===
#	Candidate	Notes	Elected
1	Anthony Slaughter	Leader of the Wales Green Party.	✗
2	Ian Chandler		✗
3	Ceri Davies		✗
4	Duncan Rees	Co-Deputy leader of the Wales Green Party.	✗

=== Yorkshire and the Humber ===
#	Candidate	Occupation	Elected
1	Magid Magid	Lord Mayor of Sheffield	✓
2	Alison Teal	Member of Sheffield City Council	✗
3	Andrew Cooper		✗
4	Louise Houghton		✗
5	Lars Kramm	Regional Chair of the European Regional Scout Committee (2019–2021)	✗
6	Ann Forsaith		✗

== Labour Party ==
The Labour Party stood candidates in all constituencies in Great Britain.

=== South East England ===
The Labour Party had a list of 10 candidates for the 10 seats available in the South East of England.

#	Candidate	Occupation	Elected
1	John Howarth	Incumbent MEP since 2017	✓
2	Cathy Shutt	University teacher and researcher	✗
3	Arran Richard Neathey	Member of Runnymede Borough Council	✗
4	Emma Christina Turnbull	Member of Oxfordshire County Council	✗
5	Rohit K. Dasgupta	Academic and Member of Newham London Borough Council	✗
6	Amy Lauren Fowler	Labour Party activist	✗
7	Duncan Enright	Member of Oxfordshire County Council	✗
8	Lubna Aiysha Arshad	Member of Oxford City Council	✗
9	Simon Guy Burgess	Former prospective parliamentary candidate for Brighton Kemptown in 2010	✗
10	Rachael Eowyn Ward	Momentum activist	✗

=== South West England ===
#	Candidate	Occupation	Elected
1	Clare Moody	Trade unionist and MEP since 2014.	✗
2	Lord Andrew Adonis	Journalist and Labour member of the House of Lords	✗
3	Jayne Kirkham	Labour candidate for Truro and Falmouth at the 2017 general election.	✗
4	Neil Guild	Labour candidate for Taunton Deane at the 2015 general election.	✗
5	Yvonne Atkinson	Labour member of Devon County Council.	✗
6	Sadik Al-Hassan	Pharmacy manager from Kingswood in South Gloucestershire.	✗

=== Yorkshire and the Humber ===
#	Candidate	Occupation	Elected
1	Richard Corbett	Incumbent Member of the European Parliament	✗
2	Eloise Todd		✗
3	Jawad Mohammed Khan	Member of the Young Labour National Committee	✗
4	Jayne Allport		✗
5	Martin Mayer		✗
6	Alison Hume	Television writer, Member of Parliament (MP) for Scarborough and Whitby since 2024	✗

== Scottish National Party ==
The Scottish National Party stood 6 candidates for all the seats in Scotland.

#	Candidate	Occupation	Elected
1	Alyn Edward Smith	Incumbent MEP since 2004	✓ Until resignation after election in the 2019 UK general election
2	Christian Allard	MSP from North East Scotland since 2013	✓
3	Aileen McLeod	MSP from South Scotland 2011 to 2016 Minister for Environment, Climate Change and Land Reform 2014 to 2016	✓
4	Margaret Ferrier	Former MP for Rutherglen and Hamilton West 2015 to 2017	✗ was not co-opted as elected in the 2019 UK general election
5	Heather Anderson	Member of Scottish Borders Council since 2017	✗ Not elected immediately ✓ co-opted following the resignation of Alyn Smith and election to the UK Parliament of Margaret Ferrier
6	Alex Kerr	University student	✗

== UKIP ==
=== South West England ===
#	Candidate	Occupation	Elected
1	Lawrence Webb		✗
2	Carl Benjamin	Anti-feminist YouTuber and political commentator	✗
3	Tony McIntyre		✗
4	Lester Taylor		✗
5	Stephen Lee		✗
6	Alison Sheridan		✗

=== Yorkshire and the Humber ===
#	Candidate	Occupation	Elected
1	Mike Hookem	Incumbent UKIP Member of the European Parliament	✗
2	Gary Shores		✗
3	John Hancock		✗
4	David Dews		✗
5	Graeme Waddicar		✗
6	Clifford Parsons		✗

== Plaid Cymru ==
Plaid Cymru, the party of Wales, only contested the Wales constituency.

#	Candidate	Occupation	Elected
1	Jill Evans	Incumbent MEP	✓
2	Carmen Smith	Appointed to the House of Lords in the 2024 Special Honours	✗
3	Patrick McGuinness	Academic, critic, novelist and poet	✗
4	Ioan Bellin	Television journalist	✗

== Yorkshire Party ==
The Yorkshire Party only stood candidates in the Yorkshire and the Humber constituency:

#	Candidate	Occupation	Elected
1	Chris Whitwood	Leader of the Yorkshire Party (2019-2020)	✗
2	Mike Jordan		✗
3	Jack Carrington		✗
4	Laura Walker		✗
5	Bob Buxton		✗
6	Dan Cochran		✗

== Northern Ireland ==
Northern Ireland has a different party system to Great Britain and used the single transferable vote rather than the party list system to elect 3 MEPs. This meant the party list included one candidate per party for the three seats available. There were 11 candidates:

#	Party	Candidate	Occupation	Elected
1	Sinn Féin	Martina Anderson	Incumbent MEP	✓
2	DUP	Diane Dodds	Incumbent MEP	✓
3	Alliance	Naomi Long	Former MP and Member of the Legislative Assembly	✓
4	SDLP	Colum Eastwood	Member of the Legislative Assembly	✗
5	TUV	Jim Allister	Member of the Legislative Assembly	✗
6	Ulster Unionist	Danny Kennedy	Member of the Legislative Assembly	✗
7	Green (NI)	Clare Bailey	Member of the Legislative Assembly	✗
8	UKIP	Robert Hill	Former DUP member of Antrim and Newtownabbey Borough Council	✗
9	Independent	Jane Morrice	Former Member of the Legislative Assembly from the NI Women's Coalition	✗
10	Independent	Neil McCann	Barrister	✗
11	NI Conservatives	Amandeep Singh Bhoga	Prospective parliamentary candidate for Upper Bann in the 2015 general election	✗

== See also ==
- Party-list proportional representation
