= Coleg Menai =

Further education college in north Wales

- Coleg Menai logo
- Type: Further Education College
- Principal: Siôn Peters-Flynn
- Location: Ffordd Penlan, Parc Menai, Bangor, Gwynedd, LL57 2TP, Wales
- Campus: Bangor, Caernarfon, Holyhead, Llangefni, Parc Menai (Art & Design)
- Website: https://www.gllm.ac.uk/

Coleg Menai (Welsh for 'Menai college') is a further education college located in Bangor, Gwynedd, Wales. The college has campuses in Parc Menai, Llangefni, Caernarfon and Holyhead.

The college provides a range of academic and vocational courses including A levels, Apprenticeships, English for Speakers of Other Languages programmes and Access courses. It also offers some higher education courses.

On 2 April 2012, Coleg Menai and Coleg Llandrillo Cymru (which included Coleg Meirion-Dwyfor) merged to create Grwp Llandrillo Menai, the largest further education institute in Wales.

== Notable alumni ==
- Matthew Dent, designer
- Nathan Gill, former UK Independence Party and Reform Party MEP
- Owain Tudur Jones, footballer, presenter
- Cassia Pike, footballer
