= Tudno FM =

Radio station in Wales (2008–2020)

Llandudno; Wales
- Broadcast area: Llandudno and surrounding areas
- Frequencies: 107.8 MHz, Online

Programming
- Format: Community: Talk and music

Ownership
- Owner: Llandudno Community Radio

History
- First air date: 1 March 2008 (RSL transmission); 12 July 2008 (Permanent transmission)

Technical information
- Transmitter coordinates: 53.3175°N 3.8251°W

Links
- Website: www.tudno.co.uk

Tudno FM was a community radio station serving the area around Llandudno in Conwy County Borough, north Wales, broadcasting on 107.8 FM locally and via the station's website. Tudno FM was owned and operated by Llandudno Community Radio and was a non-profit, non-commercial radio station broadcasting seven days a week.

The station's schedule consisted largely of music and talk programming along with national news bulletins, local features, specialist music programming and Welsh language output. Apart from national news bulletins from Sky News Radio in London, all of Tudno FM's output was produced and presented locally.

Tudno FM launched at 10am on Saturday 1 March 2008 for a 28-day RSL transmission and continued to broadcast some live programming online before launching a full, permanent service on Saturday 12 July 2008.

The station was broadcast from its studios, offices and transmitter at the Ty Hapus Community Centre, before moving in March 2019 to the Ty Llewelyn Community Centre. It was permitted to broadcast on FM within a 5 km radius.

Tudno FM ended live programming on 28 September 2020, owing to financial and operational difficulties as a result of the COVID-19 pandemic. The station continued to air automated music for a short time, before it ceased broadcasting.
