= Grŵp Llandrillo Menai =

Group of colleges for adult learners in north Wales

Coordinates: 53°13′23″N 4°8′29″W

- Grŵp Llandrillo Menai logo
- Motto: Inspiring Success
- Type: Further Education College
- Established: 2 April 2012
- Principal: Aled Jones-Griffith Chief Executive Officer Dr Siôn Peters-Flynn Principal Coleg Menai & Coleg Meirion-Dwyfor Paul Flanagan Principal Coleg Llandrillo
- Administrative staff: 1,650
- Students: 34,000+
- Location: North Wales, Wales
- Campus: Multiple campuses
- Website: www.gllm.ac.uk

Grŵp Llandrillo Menai (GLLM) is an umbrella organisation overseeing the operation of three member colleges in North Wales: Coleg Llandrillo, Coleg Menai and Coleg Meirion-Dwyfor.

It is Wales's largest further-education (FE) institution and one of the largest FE college groups in the UK. It employs 1,650 staff and delivers courses to around 34,000 students across north-west Wales and central north Wales in the counties of Anglesey, Conwy County Borough, Denbighshire and Gwynedd. As well as thirteen learning sites, the group owns business and research facilities.

== Establishment ==
Grŵp Llandrillo Menai was founded on 2 April 2012 by the corporate merger of Coleg Menai with the legal entity then known as Coleg Llandrillo Cymru (which had already subsumed Coleg Meirion-Dwyfor in 2010).

== Locations ==
Grŵp Llandrillo Menai's thirteen sites are within the following local communities: Abergele, Bangor, Caernarfon, Colwyn Bay, Denbigh, Dolgellau, Glynllifon (near Llandwrog), Holyhead, Llangefni, Parc Menai (in Treborth near Bangor), Pwllheli, Rhos-on-Sea (near Colwyn Bay) and Rhyl. Many of these community sites are within annexes of libraries, schools and community centres.

Of those, the three principal campuses—that both cover a large area with multiple buildings and act as the headquarters of a constituent college—are, in descending order of size:

- Llandudno Road, Rhos-on-Sea (Coleg Llandrillo)
- Friddoedd Road, Bangor (Coleg Menai)
- Ty'n y Coed Road, Dolgellau (Coleg Meirion-Dwyfor)
