= Coleg Llandrillo =

College in north Wales

Coordinates: 53.312°N 3.758°W

- Coleg Llandrillo logo
- Type: Further Education College
- Established: 1965
- Principal: Paul Flanagan
- Location: Llandudno Road, Rhos-on-Sea, Colwyn Bay, Wales, United Kingdom
- Campus: Abergele; Colwyn Bay Library; Rhos-on-Sea (main); Rhyl
- Website: https://www.gllm.ac.uk/

Coleg Llandrillo (Welsh for 'Llandrillo college') is a college in the north of Wales. After its merger in 2012, Grwp Llandrillo Menai became Wales' largest further education institution.

== History ==
The college (which originally only included the main campus at Rhos-on-Sea) was opened as Llandrillo Technical College by Prince Philip, Duke of Edinburgh, on 23 June 1965.

The word "Technical" was removed from the name of the college in response to the college's shift towards teaching academic as well as vocational subjects. The name Coleg Llandrillo Cymru was adopted around 2002 and was intended to imply that the college is for the whole of Wales. Since its merger with Coleg Menai, it is now known as Coleg Llandrillo.

=== 2010 merger ===
Coleg Llandrillo formally merged with Coleg Meirion-Dwyfor on 1 April 2010. The merged college (which retained the Coleg Llandrillo name) was located at nine campuses across three counties. Although the colleges had merged their management and administration, the Coleg Meirion-Dwyfor campuses retained the Coleg Meirion-Dwyfor name.

=== 2012 merger ===
In April 2012, Coleg Llandrillo Cymru (which included Coleg Meirion-Dwyfor) merged with Coleg Menai to form Grwp Llandrillo Menai. With 20,000 students across four counties Grwp Llandrillo Menai became Wales' largest further education institution. Coleg Llandrillo Cymru became known as Coleg Llandrillo.

== Campuses ==
No. of venue	Location	Notes
1	Rhos-on-Sea	University Centre (opened September 2014)
2	Rhyl	Also known as Rhyl 6th Form College
3	Abergele	
4	Colwyn Bay Library	

The college has campuses in Rhos-on-Sea, Rhyl, Abergele and a community hub in Colwyn Bay library.

The main site or campus is on Llandudno Road at the westerly extremity of Rhos-on-Sea, bordering Rhos-on-Sea Golf Course and close to Penrhyn Bay.

== Notable former pupils ==
- Bryan Parry, actor (Emmerdale, Pride)
