= List of worker cooperatives =

This is a list of worker cooperatives by country.

== Asia ==
=== India ===
- Indian Coffee House
- Kerala Dinesh Beedi
- Shri Mahila Griha Udyog Lijjat Papad
- Uralungal Labour Contract Co-operative Society – A worker co-operative in the state of Kerala that builds infrastructure projects

== Europe ==
=== France ===
- Motion Twin, video game studio

=== Germany ===
- control.alt.coop
- Cosmo Kurier
- Gärtnerei Ulenburg
- Holzverbindung
- iteratec nurdemteam
- Jointech
- Miraphone
- Platform Coops
- Reinblau
- Village One
- Die Werftgenossen
- Zimmerei Grünspecht

=== Spain ===
- Danobat
- Embega
- Eroski
- Igalia
- Irizar
- Mondragon Corporation
- Orbea
- ULMA Group

=== United Kingdom ===
- AK Press
- Corporate Watch
- Daily Bread Co-operative
- Edinburgh Bicycle Co-operative, Edinburgh
- Equal Exchange Trading
- Footprint Workers Co-op, Leeds
- Greencity Wholefoods
- John Lewis Partnership, nationwide
- Lupine Adventure Co-op, Leeds
- Piehouse Co-op, London
- Scott Bader
- Suma
- Swann Morton
- Unicorn Grocery, Manchester
- Veggies of Nottingham

== North America ==
=== Canada ===
- Come As You Are, Toronto, Ontario
- Just Us!
- KO_OP

=== Mexico ===
- Pascual Boing
- Zapatista coffee cooperatives, Chiapas

=== United States ===
- AK Press, Chico, California
- Alvarado Street Bakery, Petaluma, California
- Arizmendi Bakery
- Breitenbush Hot Springs Retreat & Conference Center, Detroit, Oregon
- Ché Café
- Cheese Board Collective, Berkeley, California
- Citybikes Workers' Cooperative, Portland, Oregon
- Cooperative Care, Wisconsin
- Cooperative Home Care Associates (CHCA), Bronx, New York
- Defector Media, New York City, New York
- Dollars and Sense, Boston, Massachusetts
- East Harlem Cleaning LLC, New York City
- Equal Exchange, West Bridgewater, Massachusetts
- Evergreen Cooperatives, Cleveland, Ohio
- Firestorm Books & Coffee
- Green Worker Cooperatives, the Bronx, New York
- Hard Times Café, Minneapolis, Minnesota
- Isthmus Engineering and Manufacturing, Madison, Wisconsin
- Little Grill Collective, Harrisonburg, Virginia
- Lucy Parsons Center, Boston, Massachusetts
- Maximum Fun, Los Angeles, California
- Means TV, Detroit, Michigan
- Morning Bell Coffee Roasters, Ames, Iowa
- Namaste Solar, Boulder, Colorado
- New Era Windows, Chicago, Illinois
- New Prairie Construction, Urbana, Illinois
- Rainbow Grocery Cooperative, San Francisco, California
- Red Emma's Bookstore Coffeehouse, Baltimore, Maryland
- Select Machine, Inc., Kent, Ohio
- Seward Community Cafe, Minneapolis, Minnesota
- South Mountain Company, West Tisbury, Massachusetts
- Sustainergy, Cincinnati, Ohio
- TESA Collective
- The Drivers Cooperative, New York City
- Weaver Street Market, North Carolina
- Union Cab Cooperative, Madison, Wisconsin

== South America ==
=== Argentina ===
- Brukman factory
- FaSinPat

== See also ==
- CICOPA
- List of cooperatives
- List of employee-owned companies
- United States Federation of Worker Cooperatives
