= Economic democracy =

Socioeconomic philosophy

Economic democracy (sometimes called a democratic economy) is a socioeconomic philosophy that proposes to shift ownership and decision-making power from corporate shareholders and corporate managers (such as a board of directors) to a larger group of public stakeholders that includes workers, consumers, suppliers, communities and the broader public. No single definition or approach encompasses economic democracy, but most proponents claim that modern property relations externalize costs, subordinate the general well-being to private profit and deny the polity a democratic voice in economic policy decisions. In addition to these moral concerns, economic democracy makes practical claims, such as that it can compensate for capitalism's inherent effective demand gap.

Proponents of economic democracy generally argue that modern capitalism periodically results in economic crises, characterized by deficiency of effective demand; as society is unable to earn enough income to purchase its own production output. Corporate monopoly of common resources typically creates artificial scarcity, resulting in socio-economic imbalances that restrict workers from access to economic opportunity and diminish consumer purchasing power. Economic democracy has been proposed as a component of larger socioeconomic ideologies, as a stand-alone theory and as a variety of reform agendas. For example, as a means to securing full economic rights, it opens a path to full political rights, defined as including the former. Both market and non-market theories of economic democracy have been proposed. As a reform agenda, supporting theories and real-world examples can include decentralization, democratic cooperatives, public banking, fair trade and the regionalization of food production and currency.

== Deficiency of effective demand ==
According to many analysts, deficiency of effective demand is the most fundamental economic problem. That is, modern society does not earn enough income to purchase its output. For example, economic geographer David Harvey claims, "Workers spending their wages is one source of effective demand, but the total wage bill is always less than the total capital in circulation (otherwise there would be no profit), so the purchase of wage goods that sustain daily life (even with a suburban lifestyle) is never sufficient for the profitable sale of the total output".

In the Georgist view of any economic system, "wealth" includes all material things produced by labor for the satisfaction of human desires and having exchange value. Land, labor and capital are generally considered the essential factors in producing wealth. Land includes all natural opportunities and forces. Labor includes all human exertion. Capital includes the portion of wealth devoted to producing more wealth. While the income of any individual might include proceeds from any combination of these three sources—land, labor and capital are generally considered mutually exclusive factors in economic models of the production and distribution of wealth. According to Henry George: "People seek to satisfy their desires with the least exertion". Human beings interact with nature to produce goods and services that other human beings need or desire. The laws and customs that govern the relationships among these entities constitute the economic structure of a given society.

Alternately, David Schweickart asserts in his book, After Capitalism: "The structure of a capitalist society consists of three basic components:

- "The bulk of the means of production are privately owned, either directly by individuals or by corporations that are themselves owned by private individuals.
- "Products are exchanged in a market -- that is to say, goods and services are bought and sold at prices determined for the most part by competition and not by some governmental pricing authority. Individual enterprises compete with one another in providing goods and services to consumers, each enterprise trying to make a profit. This competition is the primary determinant of prices.
- "Most of the people who work for pay in this society work for other people, who own the means of production. Most working people are 'wage labourers'".

Supply and demand are generally accepted as market functions for establishing prices. Organisations typically endeavor to 1) minimize the cost of production; 2) increase sales; in order to 3) maximize profits. But, according to David Schweickart, if "those who produce the goods and services of society are paid less than their productive contribution", then as consumers they cannot buy all the goods produced, and investor confidence tends to decline, triggering declines in production and employment. Such economic instability stems from a central contradiction: Wages are both a cost of production and an essential source of effective demand (needs or desires backed with purchasing power), resulting in deficiency of effective demand along with a growing interest in economic democracy.

In chapter 3 of his book, "Community Organizing: Theory and Practice", Douglas P. Biklen discusses a variety of perspectives on "The Making of Social Problems". One of those views suggests that "writers and organizers who define social problems in terms of social and economic democracy see problems not as the experiences of poor people, but as the relationship of poverty to wealth and exploitation". Biklen states that according to this viewpoint:

[C]orporate power, upper class power, uneven distribution of wealth and prejudice cause social problems... [T]he problem is not one of poverty, but of enormous wealth. The problem is not one of gaps or cracks in an otherwise fine system but of a system which perpetuates prejudicial views concerning race, sex, age, and disability. The problem is not one of incompetence but of barriers to education, jobs, and power. Accordingly, as long as there is a deep gulf between social classes, both in terms of wealth, power, and outlook, traditional social programs will act merely as palliatives to oppression and not as a way of ending large scale human misery. This perspective is, above all, eclectic. It embraces Marx's criticism of social class inequality but is not only a social class analysis. It is anti-racist, but it is not only a theory of race equality. It favors democratic distribution of power but is also an economic theory. It can be called a social and economic democracy perspective.

=== Savings, investment and unemployment ===
In his 1879 book Progress and Poverty, Henry George argued that a majority of wealth created in a "free market" economy was appropriated by land owners and monopolists through economic rents, and that concentration of such unearned wealth was the root cause of poverty. "Behind the abstraction known as 'the market' lurks a set of institutions designed to maximize the wealth and power of the most privileged group of people in the world—the creditor-rentier class of the first world and their junior partners in the third". Schweickart claimed that private savings are not only unnecessary for economic growth, they are often harmful to the overall economy.

In an advanced industrial society, business credit is necessary for a healthy economy. A business that wants to expand production needs to command the labor of others, and money is the default mechanism for exercising this authority. It is often cheaper for a business to borrow capital from a bank than to stockpile cash.

If private savings are loaned out to entrepreneurs who use them to buy raw materials and hire workers, then aggregate demand is not reduced. However, when private savings are not reinvested, the whole economy suffers recession, unemployment, and disappearance of savings which characterize deficiency of effective demand.

In this view, unemployment is not an aberration, indicating any sort of systemic malfunction. Rather, unemployment is a necessary structural feature of capitalism, intended to discipline the workforce. If unemployment is too low, workers make wage demands that either cut into profits to an extent that jeopardizes future investment, or are passed on to consumers, thus generating inflationary instability. Schweickart suggested, "Capitalism cannot be a full-employment economy, except in the very short term. For unemployment is the "invisible hand"—carrying a stick—that keeps the workforce in line." In this view, Adam Smith's "invisible hand" does not seem reliable to guide economic forces on a large scale.

Assuming business credit could come from public sources rather than from private savers, Schweickart and other analysts consider interest payments to private savers both undeserved and unnecessary for economic growth. Moreover, the personal decision to save rather than consume decreases aggregate demand, increases the likelihood of unemployment, and exacerbates the tendency toward economic stagnation. Since wealthy people tend to save more than poor people, the propensity of an economy to slump because of excess saving becomes ever more acute as a society becomes more affluent. Richard Wilkinson and Kate Pickett suggested that health and social problems are significantly worse in more unequal wealthy nations. They argue that there are "pernicious effects that inequality has on societies: eroding trust, increasing anxiety and illness, (and) encouraging excessive consumption"

=== Monopoly power versus purchasing power ===
Regarding a social and economic democracy perspective on social problems, Douglas P. Biklen states:

The theme of profit superseding individual well-being flows through this antimonopoly view of social problems. On the one hand, poor and middle income people find their lives deformed by their meager or nonexistent ability to pay for goods and services. Wealthy people, on the other hand, find that their relative position, in terms of wealth and power, grows with their ability to maintain the gulf between social classes. Thus monopolies or concentrated wealth plays a large part in creating social problems. Indeed, one might say, monopolies and policies which promote the former or concentrations of wealth are the problem.

The discipline of economics is largely a study of scarcity management; "the science which studies human behavior as a relationship between ends and scarce means which have alternative uses". Absent scarcity and alternative uses of available resources, many analysts claim there is no economic problem". While he considers these functions a public wrong, Kellogg also asserted the responsibility of the public to find and implement a remedy. Generally considered monopoly power, some view this "public wrong" as the most influential factor in artificial scarcity. For example, Henry George further suggested:

There is in reality no conflict between labor and capital; the true conflict is between labor and monopoly... Abolish the monopoly that forbids men to employ themselves and capital could not possibly oppress labor... [R]emove the cause of that injustice which deprives the laborer of the capital his toil creates and the sharp distinction between capitalist and laborer would, in fact, cease to exist.

For example, many analysts consider invention a "more or less costless store of knowledge, captured by monopoly capital and protected in order to make it secret and a 'rare and scarce commodity', for sale at monopoly prices. So far as invention is concerned, a price is put on them not because they are scarce but in order to make them scarce to those who want to use them." Patent monopolies raise share prices above tangible labor value. The difference between labor-value and monopoly-value raises goods prices, and is collected as "profit" by intermediaries who have contributed nothing to earn it.

Analysts generally agree that such conditions typically result in a deficiency of effective demand. Labor does not earn enough to buy what enterprises produce. According to Jack Rasmus, author of The Trillion Dollar Income Shift, in June 2006, investment bank Goldman Sachs reported: "The most important contribution to the higher profit margins over the past five years has been a decline in Labor's share of national income."

=== Enclosure of the commons ===
Artificially restricted access of labor to common resources is generally considered monopoly or enclosure of the commons. Due to the economic imbalance inherently imposed, such monopoly structures tend to be centrally dictated by law, and must be maintained by military force, trade agreements, or both.

In 1911, American journalist Ambrose Bierce defined "land" as:

A part of the earth's surface, considered as property. The theory that land is property subject to private ownership and control is the foundation of modern society.... Carried to its logical conclusion, it means that some have the right to prevent others from living; for the right to own implies the right exclusively to occupy; and in fact laws of trespass are enacted wherever property in land is recognized. It follows that if the whole area of terra firma is owned by A, B and C, there will be no place for D, E, F and G to be born, or, born as trespassers, to exist.

In The Servile State (1912), Hilaire Belloc referred to the Enclosures Movement when he said, "England was already captured by a wealthy oligarchy before the series of great industrial discoveries began". If you sought the accumulated wealth preliminary to launching new industry, "you had to turn to the class which had already monopolized the bulk of the means of production in England. The rich men alone could furnish you with those supplies".

According to Peter Barnes, author of Capitalism 3.0, when Adam Smith wrote The Wealth of Nations in 1776, the dominant form of business was partnership, in which regional groups of co-workers ran co-owned businesses. From this perspective, many considered the corporate model—stock sold to strangers—inherently prone to fraud. While numerous scandals historically support this dim view of corporate policy, small partnerships could not possibly compete with the aggregate capital generated by corporate economies of scale. The greatest advantage of corporations over any other business model is their ability to raise capital from strangers. The corporate model benefits from laws that limit stockholders' liability to the amounts they have invested.

In A Preface To Economic Democracy, Robert A. Dahl suggests that agrarian economy and society in the early United States "underwent a revolutionary transformation into a new system of commercial and industrial capitalism that automatically generated vast inequalities of wealth, income, status, and power." Dahl claims that such inequalities result from the "liberty to accumulate unlimited economic resources and to organize economic activity into hierarchically governed enterprises."

=== The rise of corporations and ending labor shortage ===
According to author Greg MacLeod, the concept of the corporation originated in Roman times. However, "the modern business corporation evolved radically from its ancient roots into a form with little relation to the purpose as understood by historians of law." John Davis, a legal historian, noted that the precursor of the business corporation was the first monastery, established in the sixth century, the purpose of which was to serve society. Most business corporations before 1900 developed in Great Britain, where they were established by royal charter, with the expectation of contributions to society. Incorporation was a privilege granted in return for service to the crown or the nation. MacLeod goes on to say:

A corporation is considered by the law to exist as a legal person. In the Middle Ages it was called a "persona ficta". This is a very useful way of looking at a business corporation, because it suggests correctly that the corporate person has a certain personality. It has duties and responsibilities vested unto it by the legitimate government or society that fostered it. The corporate person receives great benefits from society – and, in return, it must exercise great responsibilities. One of the most basic responsibilities is job creation, a fundamental need in any society.

By the mid-nineteenth century, corporations could live forever, engage in any legal activity, and merge with or acquire other corporations. In 1886, the U.S. Supreme Court legally recognized corporations as “persons”, entitled under the Fourteenth Amendment to the same protections as living citizens. Unlike average citizens, large corporations had large flows of money at their disposal. With this money they can hire lobbyists, donate copiously to politicians, and sway public opinion.

But, despite Supreme Court rulings, the modern corporation is not a real person. Rather, the publicly traded stock corporation is what Barnes terms an "automaton", explicitly designed to maximize return to its owners. A corporation never sleeps or slows down. It externalizes as many costs as possible, and never reaches an upper limit of profitability, because no such limit has yet been established. As a result, corporations keep getting larger. In 1955, sales of the Fortune 500 accounted for one-third of U.S. gross domestic product. By 2004 they commanded two-thirds. In other words, these few hundred corporations replaced smaller firms organized as partnerships or proprietorships. Corporations have established a homogeneous global playing field around which they can freely move raw materials, labor, capital, finished products, tax-paying obligations, and profits. Thus, corporate franchise has become a perpetual grant of sovereignty, including immortality, self-government, and limited liability. By the end of the twentieth century, corporate power—both economic and political—stretched worldwide. International agreements not only lowered tariffs but extended corporate property rights and reduced the ability of sovereign nations to regulate corporations.

David Schweickart submits that such "hypermobility of capital" generates economic and political insecurity. "If the search for lower wages comes to dominate the movement of capital, the result will be not only a lowering of worldwide wage disparities (the good to which some economists point) but also a lowering of total global income (a straight-out utilitarian bad)." Jack Rasmus, author of The War At Home and The Trillion Dollar Income Shift, argues that the increasing concentration of corporate power is a cause of the large-scale debt, unemployment, and poverty characteristic of economic recession and depression. According to Rasmus, income inequality in contemporary America increased as the relative share of income for corporations and the wealthiest one percent of households rose while income shares declined for 80-percent of the United States workforce. After rising steadily for three decades after World War II, the standard of living for most American workers has sharply declined between the mid-1970s to the present. Rasmus likens the widening income gap in contemporary American society to the decade leading up to the Great Depression, estimating "well over $1 trillion in income is transferred annually from the roughly 90 million working class families in America to corporations and the wealthiest non-working-class households. While a hundred new billionaires were created since 2001, real weekly earnings for 100 million workers are less in 2007 than in 1980 when Ronald Reagan took office".

According to economist Richard D. Wolff, the 1970s brought an end to the labor shortage which had facilitated more than a century of rising average real wages in the United States. Wolff says Americans responded to the resulting deficiency of effective demand by working more hours and excessive borrowing; the latter leading to the 2008 financial crisis.

=== Imperialism ===
According to David Harvey, "the export of capital and the cultivation of new markets around the world" is a solution "as old as capitalism itself" for the deficiency of effective demand. Imperialism, as defined by Dictionary of Human Geography, is "the creation and/or maintenance of an unequal economic, cultural, and territorial relationship, usually between states and often in the form of an empire, based on domination and subordination." "These geographic shifts", according to David Harvey, "are the heart of uneven geographic development".

Vladimir Lenin viewed imperialism as the highest stage of capitalism. He asserted that the merging of banks and industrial cartels gave rise to finance capital, which was then exported (rather than goods) in pursuit of greater profits than the home market could offer. Political and financial power became divided among international monopolist firms and European states, colonizing large parts of the world in support of their businesses. According to analyst Michael Parenti, imperialism is "the process whereby the dominant politico-economic interests of one nation expropriate for their own enrichment the land, labor, raw materials, and markets of another people." Parenti says imperialism is older than capitalism. Given its expansionist nature, capitalism has little inclination to stay home. While he conceded imperialism is not typically recognized as a legitimate allegation about the United States, Parenti argued:

Emperors and conquistadors were interested mostly in plunder and tribute, gold and glory. Capitalist imperialism differs from these earlier forms in the way it systematically accumulates capital through the organized exploitation of labor and the penetration of overseas markets. Capitalist imperialism invests in other countries, transforming and dominating their economies, cultures, and political life, integrating their financial and productive structures into an international system of capital accumulation.

In his book, The Political Struggle for the 21st century, J.W. Smith examines the economic basis for the history of imperial civilization. On a global scale, he says developed nations tended to impede or prohibit the economic and technological advancement of weaker developing countries through the military force, martial law, and inequitable practices of trade that typically characterize colonialism. Rhetorically termed as "survival of the fittest", or "might makes right", such economic crises stem from the imbalances imposed by corporate imperialism. Just as cities in the Middle Ages monopolized the means of production by conquering and controlling the sources of raw materials and countryside markets, Smith claims that contemporary centers of capital now control our present world through private monopoly of public resources sometimes known as "the commons". Through inequalities of trade, developing countries are overcharged for import of manufactured goods and underpaid for raw material exports, as wealth is siphoned from the periphery of empire and hoarded at the imperial-centers-of-capital:

Over eight-hundred years ago the powerful of the city-states of Europe learned to control the resources and markets of the countryside by raiding and destroying others’ primitive industrial capital, thus openly monopolizing that capital and establishing and maintaining extreme inequality of pay. This low pay siphoned the wealth of the countryside to the imperial-centers-of-capital. The powerful had learned to plunder-by-trade and have been refining those skills ever since.

Smith goes on to say that, like other financial empires in history, the contemporary model forms alliances necessary to develop and control wealth, keeping peripheral nations impoverished providers of cheap resources for the imperial capital centers. Belloc estimated that, during the British Enclosures, "perhaps half of the whole population was proletarian", while roughly the other "half" owned and controlled the means of production. Under modern Capitalism, J.W. Smith claimed that fewer than 500 individuals possess more wealth than half of the earth's population. The wealth of 1/2 of 1-percent of the United States population roughly equals that of the lower 90-percent.

== Alternative models ==
Advocating for an "alternative economic system free of capitalism's structural flaws", economist Richard D. Wolff says reform agendas are fundamentally inadequate, given that capitalist corporations, the dominant institutions of the existing system, retain the incentives and the resources to undo any sort of reform policy. For example, Wolff goes on to say:

The New Deal–era taxes on business and the rich and regulations of enterprise behavior proved vulnerable and unsustainable. The enemies of the New Deal had the incentives (profit maximization) and the resources (their returns on investments) to undo many of its reforms after World War II, with ever-greater effect in the period since the 1970s. They systematically evaded, then weakened, the taxes and regulations of the New Deal, and eventually, when politically possible, eliminated them altogether. Business profits funded the parties, politicians, public relations campaigns, and professional think tanks that together shaped the real social effects and historical decline of government economic regulation. Examples include the destruction of the Glass-Steagall Act, the current assault on Social Security, the shift in the federal tax burden from business to individuals and from upper- to middle-income individuals, and so on.

According to David Schweickart, a serious critique of any problem cannot be content to merely note the negative features of the existing model. Instead, we must specify precisely the structural features of an alternative: "But if we want to do more than simply denounce the evils of capitalism, we must confront the claim that 'there is no alternative'—by proposing one." Schweickart argued that both full employment and guaranteed basic income are impossible under the restrictions of the U.S. economic system for two primary reasons: a) unemployment is an essential feature of capitalism, not an indication of systemic failure; and b) while capitalism thrives under polyarchy, it is not compatible with genuine democracy. Assuming these "democratic deficits" significantly impact the management of both the workplace and new investment, many proponents of economic democracy tend to favor the creation and implementation of a new economic model over reform of the existing one.

For example, Dr. Martin Luther King Jr. claimed "Communism forgets that life is individual. Capitalism forgets that life is social, and the Kingdom of Brotherhood is found neither in the thesis of Communism nor the antithesis of Capitalism but in a higher synthesis. It is found in a higher synthesis that combines the truths of both". Regarding the gap between productivity and purchasing power, Dr. King maintained:

The problem indicates that our emphasis must be two-fold. We must create full employment or we must create incomes. People must be made consumers by one method or the other. Once they are placed in this position, we need to be concerned that the potential of the individual is not wasted. New forms of work that enhance the social good will have to be devised for those for whom traditional jobs are not available.

According to historian and political economist, Gar Alperovitz: "King’s final judgment stands as instructive evidence of his understanding of the nature of systemic challenge — and also as a reminder that given the failures of both traditional socialism and corporate capitalism, it is time to get serious about clarifying not only the question of strategy, but what, in fact, the meaning of changing the system in a truly democratic direction might one day entail."

Trade unionist and social activist Allan Engler argued further that economic democracy was the working-class alternative to capitalism. In his book, "Economic Democracy", Engler stated:

When economic democracy – a world of human equality, democracy and cooperation – is the alternative, capitalism will no longer be seen as a lesser evil. When the working class, not a revolutionary party, is the agency of social transformation, change will be based on workplace organization, community mobilizations and democratic political action. The goal will be to transform capitalism into economic democracy through gains and reforms that improve living conditions while methodically replacing wealth-holders' entitlement with human entitlement, capitalist ownership with community ownership and master-servant relations with workplace democracy.

Assuming that "democracy is not just a political value, but one with profound economic implications, the problem is not to choose between plan and market, but to integrate these institutions into a democratic framework". Like capitalism, economic democracy can be defined in terms of three basic features:

- Worker self-management: each productive enterprise is controlled democratically by its workers.
- Social control of investment: funds for new investment are returned to the economy through a network of public investment banks.
- The market: enterprises interact with one another and with consumers in an environment largely free of governmental price controls. Raw materials, instruments of production and consumer goods are all bought and sold at prices largely determined by the forces of supply and demand.

In real-world practice, Schweickart concedes economic democracy will be more complicated and less "pure" than his model. However, to grasp the nature of the system and to understand its essential dynamic, it is important to have a clear picture of the basic structure. Capitalism is characterized by private ownership of productive resources, the market, and wage labor. The Soviet economic model subordinated private ownership of productive resources to public ownership by collectivizing farms and factories. It further subordinated the market to central planning—but retained the institution of wage labor.

Most proposed models for economic democracy generally begin with democratizing the workplace and the ownership of capital. Other proposals advocate replacing the market with some form of planning, as well (for example, Parecon).

=== Worker self-management ===
In worker self-management, each productive enterprise is controlled by those who work there. Workers are responsible for the operation of the facility, including organization, discipline, production techniques, and the nature, price, and distribution of products. Decisions concerning distribution are made democratically. Problems of authority delegation are solved by democratic representation. Management is chosen by the worker, not appointed by the State, not elected by the community at large and not selected by a board of directors elected by stockholders. Ultimate authority rests with the enterprise's workers, following the one-person, one-vote principle.

According to veteran World Bank economic adviser David P. Ellerman it's the employment contract that needs to be abolished, not private property. In other words, "a firm can be socialized and yet remain 'private' in the sense of not being government-owned." In his book, "The Democratic Firm", Ellerman stated:

In the world today, the main form of enterprise is based on renting human beings (privately or publicly). Our task is to construct the alternative. In the alternative type of firm, employment by the firm is replaced with membership in the firm. Economic democracy requires the abolition of the employment relation, not the abolition of private property. Democracy can be married with private property in the workplace; the result of the union is the democratic worker-owned firm.

Alternately, in Schweickart's model, workers control the workplace, but they do not "own" the means of production. Productive resources are regarded as the collective property of the society. Workers run the enterprise, use its capital assets as they see fit, and distribute the profits among themselves. Here, societal "ownership" of the enterprise manifests itself in two ways: 1) All firms pay tax on their capital assets, which goes into society's investment fund. In effect, workers rent capital assets from society. 2) Firms are required to preserve the value of the capital stock entrusted to them. This means that a depreciation fund must be maintained to repair or replace existing capital stock. This money may be spent on capital replacements or improvements, but not to supplement workers' incomes.

Italy's Legacoop and Spain's Mondragon multi-sectoral worker-cooperatives have both been able to reach significant scale and demonstrate long-term sustainability. According to a study conducted by Massachusetts Institute of Technology, the greatest lesson to be learned from these European experiences is the importance of developing an economically integrated network of cooperatives rather than a single cooperative. The report goes on to say:

In a market based economy the cooperative business form suffers from several strategic challenges when operating independently. One worker cooperative on its own is most likely doomed to fail in a highly competitive global economy. However, an ecosystem of several worker cooperatives and support organizations can create an infrastructure that leads to sustained growth and expansion. In Mondragon the cooperative network expanded from a single cooperative polytechnic school to a network of 256 industrial, retail, finance, educational, and research and development firms.

=== Social control of investment ===
While there is no single approach or 'blueprint' for social control of investment, many strategies have been proposed. For example, Gar Alperovitz claims many real-world strategies have already emerged to democratize and decentralize the ownership of wealth and capital. In addition to worker cooperatives, Alperovitz highlights ESOPs, credit unions and other cooperative forms, social enterprises, municipally owned utilities and public banks as starting points for what he has termed a "Pluralist Commonwealth".

Alternately, David Schweickart proposes a flat-rate tax on capital assets to replace all other business taxes. This "capital assets tax" is collected and invested by the central government. Funds are dispersed throughout society, first to regions and communities on a per capita basis, then to public banks in accordance with past performance, then to those firms with profitable project proposals. Profitable projects that promise increased employment are favored over those that do not. At each level, national, regional and local, legislatures decide what portion of their funds is to be used for public capital expenditures, then send the remainder to the next lower level. Associated with most banks are entrepreneurial divisions, which promote firm expansion and new firm creation. For large (regional or national) enterprises, local investment banks are complemented by regional and national investment banks. These too would be public institutions that receive their funds from the national investment fund.

Banks are public, not private, institutions that make grants, not loans, to business enterprises. According to Schweickart, these grants do not represent "free money", since an investment grant counts as an addition to the capital assets of the enterprise, upon which the capital-asset tax must be paid. Thus the capital assets tax functions as an interest rate. A bank grant is essentially a loan requiring interest payments but no repayment of principal.

While an economy of worker-self-managed enterprises might tend toward lower unemployment than under capitalism - because banks are mandated to consistently prioritize investment projects that would increase employment - Schweickart notes that it does not guarantee full employment. Social control of investment serves to increase employment. If the market provides insufficient employment, the public sector becomes the employer of last resort. The original formulation of the U.S. Humphrey-Hawkins Act of 1978 assumed that only in this way could full employment be assured in a market economy. Economic Democracy adopts this approach. Social control of investment then blocks the cyclical unemployment typical of capitalism.

=== The market ===
Hungarian historian Karl Polanyi suggested that market economies should subordinate themselves to larger societal needs. He states that human-beings, the source of labor, do not reproduce for the sole purpose of providing the market with workers. In The Great Transformation, Polanyi says that while modern states and market economies tend to grow under capitalism, both are mutually interdependent for functional development. In order for market economies to be truly prosperous, he claims social constructs must play an essential role. Polanyi claimed that land, labor, and money are all commodified under capitalism, though the inherent purpose of these items was never intended "for sale"—what he labels "fictitious commodities." He says natural resources are "God-given", money is a bookkeeping entry validated by law, and labor is a human prerogative, not a personal obligation to market economies.

Schweickart's economic democracy is a form of market economy, at least insofar as the allocation of consumer and capital goods is concerned. Firms buy raw materials and machinery from other firms and sell their products to other enterprises or consumers. "Prices are largely unregulated except by supply and demand, although in some cases price controls or price supports might be in order – as they are deemed in order in most real-world forms of capitalism."

Without a price mechanism sensitive to supply and demand, it is extremely difficult for a producer or planner to know what and how much to produce, and which production and marketing methods are the most efficient. Otherwise, it is difficult to motivate producers to be both efficient and innovative. Market competition resolves these problems, to a significant if incomplete degree, in a non-authoritarian, non-bureaucratic fashion.

Enterprises still strive to make a profit. However, "profit" in a worker-run firm is calculated differently than under capitalism. For a capitalist firm, labor is counted as a cost. For a worker-run enterprise it is not. Labor is not another "factor of production" on par with land and capital. Labor is the residual claimant. Workers get all that remains, once other costs, including depreciation set asides and the capital assets tax, have been paid.

Because of the way workplaces and the investment mechanism are structured, Schweickart's model aims to facilitate fair trade, not free trade, between nations. Under Economic Democracy, there would be virtually no cross-border capital flows. Enterprises themselves would not relocate abroad, since they are democratically controlled by their own workers. Finance capital stays mostly at home, since funds for investment are publicly generated and are mandated by law to be reinvested domestically. "Capital doesn't flow into the country, either, since there are no stocks nor corporate bonds nor businesses to buy. The capital assets of the country are collectively owned – and hence not for sale."

According to Michael Howard, "in preserving commodity exchange, a market socialism has greater continuity with the society it displaces than does nonmarket socialism, and thus it is more likely to emerge from capitalism as a result of tendencies generated within it." But Howard also suggested, "one argument against the market in socialist society has been that it blocks progress toward full communism or even leads back to capitalism". From this perspective, nonmarket models of economic democracy have also been proposed.

=== Economic democracy as part of an inclusive democracy ===
Economic democracy is described as an integral component of an inclusive democracy in Takis Fotopoulos' Towards An Inclusive Democracy as a stateless, moneyless and marketless economy that precludes private accumulation of wealth and the institutionalization of privileges for some sections of society, without relying on a mythical post-scarcity state of abundance, or sacrificing freedom of choice.

The proposed system aims to meet the basic needs of all citizens (macroeconomic decisions), and secure freedom of choice (microeconomic decisions). Therefore, the system consists of two basic elements: (1) democratic planning, which involves a feedback process between workplace assemblies, demotic assemblies and a confederal assembly, and (2) an artificial market using personal vouchers, which ensures freedom of choice but avoids the adverse effects of real markets. Although David Pepper called this system "a form of money based on the labour theory of value", it is not a money model since vouchers cannot be used as a general medium of exchange and store of wealth.

Another distinguishing feature of inclusive democracy is its distinction between basic and non-basic needs. Remuneration is determined separately according to the cost of basic needs, and according to degree of effort for non-basic needs. Inclusive democracy is based on the principle that meeting basic needs is a fundamental human right which is guaranteed to all who are in a physical condition to offer a minimal amount of work. By contrast, participatory economics guarantees that basic needs are satisfied only for public goods or are covered by compassion and by a guaranteed basic income for the unemployed and those who cannot work. Many advocates of participatory economics and Participism have contested this.

As part of inclusive democracy, economic democracy is the authority of demos (community) in the economic sphere—which requires equal distribution of economic power. Therefore, all macroeconomic decisions (overall level of production, consumption and investment, amounts of work and leisure implied, technologies to be used and so on) are made collectively and without representation. However, microeconomic decisions are made by the individual production or consumption unit through a proposed system of vouchers.

As with the case of direct democracy, economic democracy is only feasible if the participants can easily cooperate.

== Reform agendas ==
While reform agendas tend to critique the existing system and recommend corrective measures, they do not necessarily suggest alternative models to replace the fundamental structures of capitalism; private ownership of productive resources, the market and wage labor.

=== Social credit ===
Rather than an economic shortfall, many analysts consider the gap between production and purchasing power a social dividend. In this view, credit is a public utility rather than debt to financial centers. Once reinvested in human productive potential, the surplus of societal output could actually increase Gross Domestic Product rather than throttling it, resulting in a more efficient economy, overall. Social Credit is an economic reform movement that originates from theories developed by Scottish engineer Major C. H. Douglas. His aim to make societal improvement the goal of economic systems is reflected in the term "Social Credit", and published in his book, entitled Economic Democracy. In this view, the term "economic democracy" does not mean worker control of industry.

A national dividend and a compensated price mechanism are the two most essential components of the Social Credit program. While these measures have never been implemented in their purest form, they have provided a foundation for Social Credit political parties in many countries and for reform agendas that retain the title, "economic democracy".

==== National dividend ====
In his book, Capitalism 3.0, Peter Barnes likens a "National Dividend" to the game of Monopoly, where all players start with a fair distribution of financial opportunity to succeed, and try to privatize as much as they can as they move around "the commons". Distinguishing the board game from real-world business, Barnes claims that "the top 5 percent of the population owns more property than the remaining 95 percent", providing the smaller minority with an unfair advantage of approximately "$5-trillion" annually, at the beginning of the game. Contrasting "redistribution" of income (or property) with "predistribution", Barnes argues for "propertizing" (without corporately privatizing) "the commons" to spread ownership universally, without taking wealth from some and giving it to others. His suggested mechanism to this end is the establishment of a "Commons Sector", ensuring payment from the Corporate Sector for "the commons" they utilize, and equitably distributing the proceeds for the benefit of contemporary and future generations of society.

One real-world example of such reform is in the U.S. State of Alaska, where each citizen receives an annual share of the part of the state's oil revenues via the "Alaska Permanent Fund Dividend". Barnes suggests this model could extend to other states and nations because "we jointly own many valuable assets". As corporate pollution of common assets increased, the permits for such pollution would become more scarce, driving prices for those permits up. "Less pollution would equal more revenue", and over time, "trillions of dollars could flow into an American Permanent Fund".

However, none of these proposals aspire to the mandates recommended by Dr. Martin Luther King Jr.:

Two conditions are indispensable if we are to ensure that the guaranteed income operates as a consistently progressive measure. First, it must be pegged to the median income of society, not the lowest levels of income. To guarantee an income at the floor would simply perpetuate welfare standards and freeze into the society poverty conditions. Second, the guaranteed income must be dynamic; it must automatically increase as the total social income grows. Were it permitted to remain static under growth conditions, the recipients would suffer a relative decline. If periodic reviews disclose that the whole national income has risen, then the guaranteed income would have to be adjusted upward by the same percentage. Without these safeguards a creeping retrogression would occur, nullifying the gains of security and stability.

Barnes deemed any such reform unlikely. Thomas Paine originally recommended a National Dividend to compensate for the brutality of British Enclosures, but his idea was never adopted.

=== Monopoly power versus public utility ===
Rather than superficially compensating for legalized inequities, Smith recommends abolishing or redefining property rights laws with particular respect for "the commons". According to Smith exclusive title to natural resources and technologies should be converted to inclusive conditional titles—the condition being that society should collect rental values on all natural resources. Smith suggests the basic principles of monopolization under feudalism were never abandoned, and residues of exclusive feudal property rights restrict the potential efficiency of capitalism in Western cultures. He estimated that roughly 60 percent of American capital is little more than capitalized values of unearned wealth. He proposed that elimination of these monopoly values would double economic efficiency, maintain quality of life, and reduce working hours by half. Wasteful monetary flows could be stopped only by eliminating all methods of monopolization typical in Western economies.

Smith divided "primary (feudal) monopoly" into four general categories: banking; land; technology and communications. He listed three general categories of "secondary (modern) monopoly"; insurance, law, health care. Smith further claimed that converting these exclusive entitlements to inclusive human rights would minimize battles for market share, thereby eliminating most offices and staff needed to maintain monopoly structures, and stop the wars generated to protect them. Dissolving roughly half the economic activity of a monopoly system would reduce the costs of common resources by roughly half, and significantly minimize the most influential factors of poverty.

In Smith's view, most taxes should be eliminated, and productive enterprise should be privately owned and managed. Inventors should be paid well and all technology placed in the public domain. Crucial services currently monopolized through licensing should be legislated as human rights.

Smith envisioned a balanced economy under a socially owned banking commons within an inclusive society with full and equal rights for all. Federated regions collect resource rents on land and technology to a social fund to operate governments and care for social needs. Socially owned banks provide finance capital by creating debt-free money for social infrastructure and industry. Rental values return to society through expenditure on public infrastructures. Local labor is trained and employed to build and maintain water systems, sewers, roads, communication systems, railroads, ports, airports, post offices, and education systems. Purchasing power circulates regionally, as labor spends wages in consumption and governments spend resource rent and banking profits to maintain essential services.

According to Smith, all monetary systems, including money markets, should function within fractional-reserve banking. Financial capital should be the total savings of all citizens, balanced by primary-created money to fill any shortfall, or its destruction through increased reserve requirements to eliminate any surplus. Adjustments of required reserves should facilitate the balance between building with socially created money or savings. Any shortage of savings within a socially owned banking system should be alleviated by simply printing it.

=== Cooperatives ===
A cooperative is an autonomous association of persons united voluntarily to meet their common economic, social, and cultural needs and aspirations through a jointly owned and democratically controlled enterprise. By various names, cooperatives play an essential role in all forms of Economic Democracy. Classified as either consumer cooperatives or worker cooperatives, the cooperative business model is fundamental to the interests of economic democracy.

According to the International Cooperative Alliance's Statement on the Cooperative Identity, "cooperatives are democratic organizations controlled by their members, who actively participate in setting policies and making decisions. Men and women serving as elected representatives are accountable to the membership. In primary cooperatives members have equal voting rights (one member, one vote) and cooperatives at other levels are also organized in a democratic manner."

==== Worker cooperatives ====
According to the United States Federation of Worker Cooperatives: "Worker cooperatives are business entities that are owned and controlled by their members, the people who work in them. The two central characteristics of worker cooperatives are: 1) workers invest in and own the business and (2) decision-making is democratic, generally adhering to the principle of one worker-one vote." Worker cooperatives occupy multiple sectors and industries in the United States, mostly in the Northeast, the West Coast and the Upper Midwest, totaling 300 democratic workplaces in the United States, employing over 3,500 people and generating over $400 million in annual revenues. While a few are larger enterprises, most are small. Growing steadily between 1990 and 2010, technology and home health care experienced most of the recent increase.

Worker cooperatives generally employ an industrial model called workplace democracy, which rejects the "master-servant relationship" implicit in the traditional employment contract. According to Wilkinson and Pickett, neither ownership or participation alone are sufficient to establish democracy in the workplace. "[M]any share-ownership schemes amount to little more than incentive schemes, intended to make employees more compliant with management and sometimes to provide a nest-egg for retirement... To make a reliable difference to company performance, share-ownership has to be combined with more participative management methods." Dahl further argued that self-governing enterprises should not be confused with other systems they might resemble:

Self-governing enterprises only remotely resemble pseudodemocratic schemes of employee consultation by management; schemes of limited employee participation that leave all critical decisions with a management elected by stockholders; or Employee Stock Ownership Plans (ESOPs) that are created only or primarily to provide corporations with low-interest loans, lower corporate income taxes, greater cash flow, employee pension plans, or a market for their stock, without, however, any significant changes in control.

In worker cooperatives, net income is called surplus instead of profit and is distributed among the members based on hours worked, seniority, or other criteria. In a worker cooperative, workers own their jobs, and therefore have a direct stake in the local environment and the power to conduct business in ways that benefit the community rather than destroying it. Some worker cooperatives maintain what is known as a “multiple bottom line”, evaluating success not merely in terms of net income, but also by factors like their sustainability as a business, their contribution to the community, and the happiness and longevity of their workers.

Worker-control can take many forms depending on the size and type of the business. Approaches to decision-making include: an elected board of directors, elected managers, management job roles, no management at all, consensus, majority vote, or combinations of the above. Participation in decision-making becomes the responsibility and privilege of each member. In one variation, workers usually invest money when they begin working. Each member owns one share, which provides its owner with one vote in company decision-making. While membership is not a requirement of employment, only employees can become members.

According to Kenneth W. Stikkers, the Mondragon cooperatives in the Basque region of Spain have achieved a previously unknown level of economic democracy. Established in 1956, Mondragon has since become an economic model that transcends the capitalist-socialist dichotomy and thereby helps us to imagine creative solutions to current economic problems. Economist Richard D. Wolff argues that Mondragon is an example of "a stunningly successful alternative to the capitalist organization of production." The idea of economic democracy through worker ownership on a national scale has been argued by economist Tom Winters, who states that "building a cooperative economy is one small step on the journey to reclaiming the wealth we all collectively create."

==== Consumer cooperatives ====
A consumers' cooperative is owned by its customers for their mutual benefit. Oriented towards service rather than profit, consumers often provide capital to launch or purchase the enterprise. In practice, consumer cooperatives price goods and services at competitive market rates. The co-op returns profits to the consumer/owner according to a formula instead of paying a separate investor group.

In his book, From Mondragon To America, Greg MacLeod argues that "in consumer cooperatives where the customer-members own the capital and the employees are subject to capital, the normal dynamic is the adversarial relationship of labor to capital. Sometimes the result is strikes of labor against management." In some cooperatives, however, consumer/owners are workers as well. For example, Mondragon has developed a large "hybrid" cooperative which sells groceries and furniture in Spain.

Consumer cooperatives vary in organization and operations, but typically follow the Rochdale Principles. Consumer cooperatives may also form Co-operative Federations. These may take the form of co-operative wholesale societies, through which they collectively purchase goods at wholesale prices and, in some cases, cooperatively own factories. Alternatively, they may be members of Co-operative unions.

Consumer cooperatives are very different from "discount clubs," which charge annual fees in exchange for a discount on purchases. The club is not owned or governed by the members and profits go to investors, not to members.

===== Food cooperatives =====
Most food co-ops are consumer cooperatives that specialize in grocery products. Members patronize the store and vote in elections. The members elect a board of directors to make high-level decisions and recruit managers. Food cooperatives were originally established to provide fresh, organic produce as a viable alternative to packaged imports. The ideas of local and slow food production can help local farmers prosper, in addition to providing consumers with fresher products. But the growing ubiquity of organic food products in corporate stores testifies to broadening consumer awareness, and to the dynamics of global marketing.

For example, associated with national and international cooperative communities, Portland Oregon cooperatives manage to survive market competition with corporate franchise. As Lee Lancaster, financial manager for Food Front, states, "cooperatives are potentially one democratic economic model that could help guide business decisions toward meeting human needs while honoring the needs of society and nature". He admits, however, it is difficult to maintain collaboration among cooperatives while also avoiding integration that typically results in centralized authority.

=== Regional trading currencies ===
According to Smith, "Currency is only the representation of wealth produced by combining land (resources), labor, and industrial capital". He claimed that no country was free when another country has such leverage over its entire economy. But by combining their resources, Smith claimed that developing nations have all three of these foundations of wealth:

By peripheral nations using the currency of an imperial center as its trading currency, the imperial center can actually print money to own industry within those periphery countries. By forming regional trading blocs and printing their own trading currency, the developing world has all four requirements for production, resources, labor, industrial capital, and finance capital. The wealth produced provides the value to back the created and circulating money.

Smith further explained that developed countries need resources from the developing world as much as developing countries need finance capital and technology from the developed world. Aside from the superior military power of the imperial centers, the undeveloped world actually has superior bargaining leverage. With independent trading currencies, developing countries could barter their resources to the developed world for the latest industrial technologies. Barter avoids "hard money monopolization" and the unequal trade between weak and strong nations that result. Smith suggested that barter was how Germany resolved many financial difficulties "put in place to strangle her", and that "World Wars I and II settled that trade dispute". He claimed that their intentions of exclusive entitlement were clearly exposed when the imperial centers resorted to military force to prevent such barter and maintain monopoly control of others' resources.

=== Democratizing workplaces and distributing productive assets ===
==== The Workplace as a political entity to be democratized ====
Workplace democracy has been cited as a possible solution to the problems that arise from excluding employees from decision-making such as low-employee morale, employee alienation, and low employee engagement.

Political theorist Isabelle Ferreras argues that there exists “a great contradiction between the democratic nature of our times and the reality of the work experience.” She argues that the modern corporation's two basic inputs, capital and labor, are treated in radically different ways. Capital owners of a firm wield power within a system of shareholder democracy that allocates voice democratically according to how much capital investment they place in the firm. Labor, on the other hand, rarely benefits from a system to voice their concerns within the firm. She argues that firms are more than just economic organizations especially given the power that they wield over people's livelihoods, environment, and rights. Rather, Ferreras holds that firms are best understood as political entities. And as political entities “it is crucial that firms be made compatible with the democratic commitments of our nations.”

Germany and to a lesser extent the broader European Union have experimented with a way of workplace democracy known as Co-determination, a system that allows workers to elect representatives that sit on the board of directors of a company. Common criticisms of workplace democracy include that democratic workplaces are less efficient than hierarchical workplace, that managers are best equipped to make company decisions since they are better educated and aware of the broader business context.

==== Creating a widespread distribution of productive assets ====
One of the biggest criticisms against capitalism is that it concentrates economic and, as a result, political power in a few hands. Theorists of economic democracy have argued that one solution to this unequal concentration of power is to create mechanisms that distribute ownership of productive assets across the entire population. In Justice as Fairness: A Restatement, John Rawls argued that only two systems could embody the main features of his principles of justice: liberal socialism or a property-owning democracy. Within a property-owning democracy, Rawls envisioned widespread use of worker-owned cooperatives, partial-employee ownership of firms, systems to redistribute one's assets after death to prevent the accumulation of wealth, as well as a strong system of asset-based redistribution that encourages workers to own productive assets.

Operating under the idea that making ownership more widespread leads to more equitable outcomes various proposals of asset-based welfare and asset-redistribution have been conceived. Individualistic and liberal asset-based welfare strategies such as the United Kingdom's Child Trust Fund or the United States Individual Development Account aimed to help people save money so that it could be invested on education, home-ownership, or entrepreneurship. More experimental and left-leaning proposals include worker owned cooperatives, ESOPS, or Roemer's coupon socialism which is a system where ownership shares of firms are equally distributed among the population with individuals being permitted to trade (but not sell) them, and where upon their death these shares return to the state to be distributed to individuals in the next generation.

== Critiques ==
Ludwig von Mises argued that ownership and control over the means of production belongs to private firms and can only be sustained by means of consumer choice, exercised daily in the marketplace. "The capitalistic social order", he claimed, therefore "is an economic democracy in the strictest sense of the word". Critics of Mises claim that consumers only vote on the value of the product when they make a purchase—they are not participating in the management of firms, or voting on how the profits are to be used.

== See also ==
- Active labour market policies – Government work relief programmes
- Campaign for Economic Democracy – California-based progressive political advocacy organization (1976-1986)
- Citizen's dividend – Georgist proposed policy
- Co-determination – Aspect of corporate law
- Cooperative economics – Study of autonomous associations' interactions with production and distribution
- Co-operative – Autonomous association of persons or organizations
- Democratic capitalism – Political and economic system
- Democratic socialism – Political philosophy
- Employee stock ownership – System giving employees stake in a company's ownership
- Energy democracy – Concept in environmental justice movement
- Guaranteed minimum income – Social-welfare system
- Libertarian socialism – Political philosophy
- List of worker cooperatives
- Market socialism – Economic system based on social ownership of the means of production in a market economy
- Profit sharing – Plan where employees share in profits
- Progressive capitalism – Approach to capitalism
- Progressive utilization theory – Socioeconomic and political philosophy
- Social democracy – Centre-left political ideology
- Social dividend – Financial return on society's capital assets
- Social economy – Economic sector
- Social ownership – Ownership of the means of production by society
- Worker co-operative – Cooperative that is owned and self-managed by its workers
- Worker representation on corporate boards of directors – Aspect of corporate law
- Workers' control – Participation in management by employees
- Workers' self-management – Form of organizational management
- Workplace democracy – Application of democratic principles to places of work
