= Embega =

Spanish worker cooperative

Embega S. Coop.
- Company type: Worker cooperative
- Industry: Components (Consumer goods/Machinery/Appliances)
- Founded: 1971
- Headquarters: Villatuerta, Navarre, Spain
- Area served: International
- Products: Appliances Handles, Human Machine Interfaces, Gaskets
- Number of employees: 89 (2014)
- Divisions: Mondragon Componentes
- Website: embega.es

Embega, S. Coop. was founded in 1971 by a group of workers from the former household appliance company Agni (today BSH Bosch und Siemens Hausgeräte GmbH), on the banks of Ega river, in Estella (Navarra, Spain).

Since the beginning, Embega was integrated in the Caja Laboral's Enterprise Division, the root with other companies like Fagor, of the Mondragon Corporation. Currently, Embega is integrated in the Components Division of Mondragon.

They began their cooperative with 43 members, specialized in machining, screen-printing and lithographing of metal plates for household appliances, automation and other decorative elements. In 1979, the anodizing and electroplating plant for aluminium profiles, with 120 workers, was started.

In 1982 a new product line was created: the Printed Gaskets Division, launched under the name of Egaprint, contributing with sealing solutions to a large range of products and markets. Seven years later, a new activity was launched: HMI Division (Human–machine interface), manufacturing graphic overlays, membrane switches and, later on, metal (anti-vandalism) keyboards. At that time there were about 210 workers on the cooperative staff.

At the end of the 1990s, a new domestic appliances component was launched: an air-to-air, heat transfer, water condenser for tumble dryers.

In 2006, Embega first subsidiary was established in Poland, due to their position in the white goods market, under the name of Embega Polska, which started its activity in Wroclaw by producing domestic appliance components.

In 2008 a new cooperative was established in which Embega took an important share: Soterna, a manufacturer of domestic solar systems.

A new product line, natural evolution of membrane switches was started early in 2013: flexible, backlighted, capacitive buttons and keyboards within the HMI division.
