= José María Ormaetxea =

Basque businessman and cooperativist (1926–2019)

José María Ormaetxea Uribeetxebarría
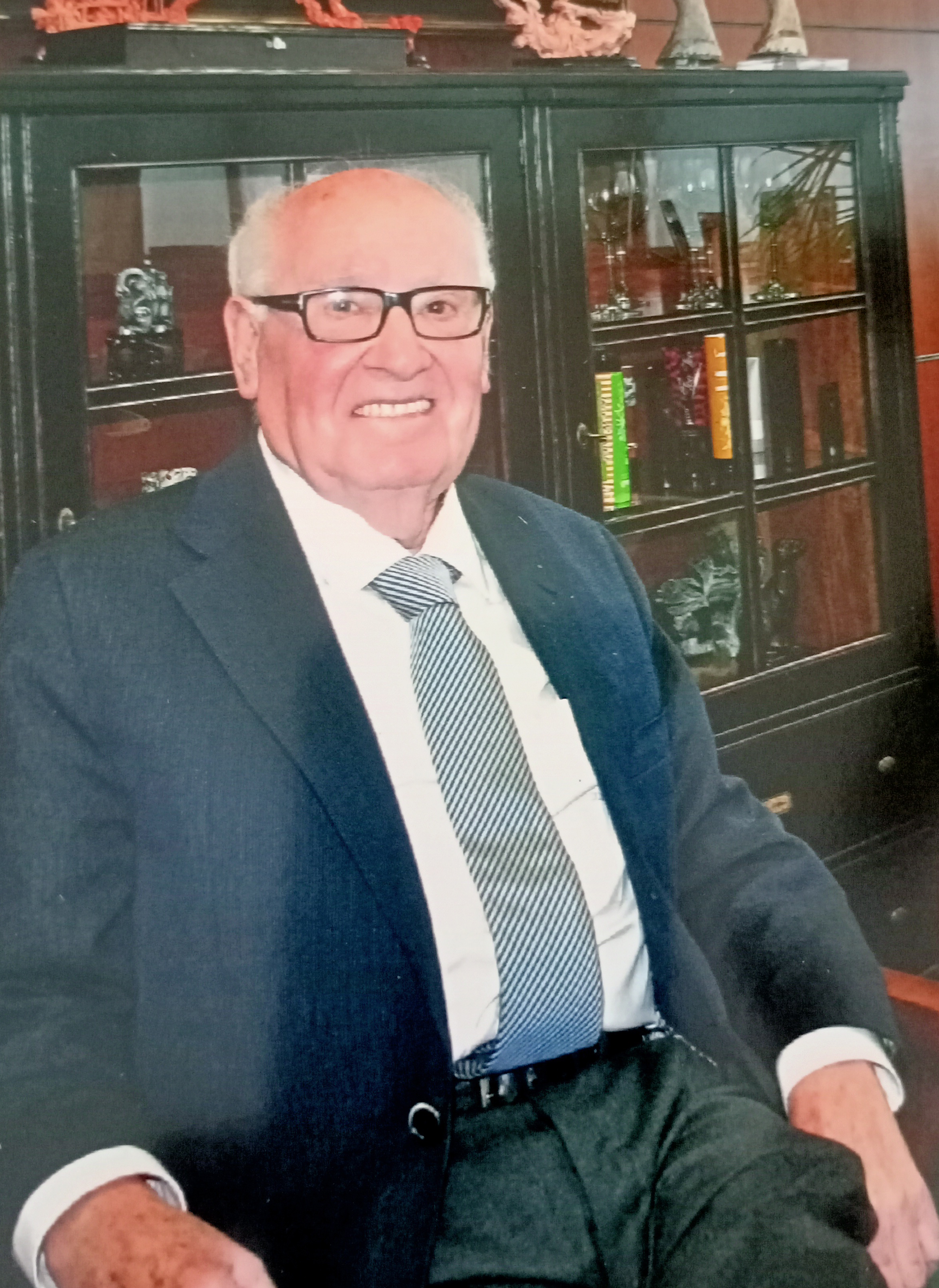
- Born: December 23, 1926; Mondragón, Gipuzkoa, Spain
- Died: July 20, 2019 (aged 92)
- Known for: One of the five founders in 1956 of Ulgor - later renamed Fagor Electrodomésticos - the first industrial cooperative enterprise of the Mondragon Corporation.

José María Ormaetxea Uribeetxebarría (23 December 1926 in Mondragón, Gipuzkoa – 20 July 2019) was a Basque businessman and cooperativist; one of the five founders in 1956 of Ulgor - later renamed Fagor Electrodomésticos - the first industrial cooperative enterprise of the Mondragon Corporation.

== Early life ==
Born in the town of Mondragón in the province of Gipuzkoa in Spain, his parents were José and Amalia.

In September 1941, he joined Unión Cerrajera S.A., the largest company in the Alto Deba Valley those days. Through its Apprentices' School, he met Father José María Arizmendiarrieta, the ideologist and promoter of cooperatives, as a teacher. This priest, who went to Mondragón as a parish priest, was an influential leader who knew how to spread his ideas about solidarity and social movements through collective work.

While working and studying, he completed his Master's degree in Industrial Chemistry in July 1946. He was one of the eleven students chosen by Arizmendiarrieta to carry on his studies at the new Escuela Profesional de Mondragón, taking his exams at the Escuela de Peritos Industriales in Zaragoza, wherein 1952 he obtained the degree of Industrial Chemical Expert. In the summer months of 1965 and 1966, together with other cooperative managers, he took part in special courses in Business Science, taught by lecturers from the Sarriko Faculty of the University of the Basque Country in Bilbao.

== Career ==
At the age of 19, in 1946, he was appointed manager of the foundry section, a position he held until he left the company in March 1956 to set up what was to become the first cooperative company, Ulgor.

On 14 April 1956, the priest José María Arizmendiarrieta blessed the first stone of Ulgor, a name that brought together the identity of the five founders: Luis Usatorre, Jesús Larrañaga, Alfonso Gorroñogoitia, José María Ormaetxea and Javier Ortubay. They started the project to embody Arizmendiarreta's ideals and create a company based on the values of solidarity.

He was manager of Ulgor until 1959, when, at Arizmendiarrieta's request, the financial cooperative Laboral Kutxa was created: he managed it until 1987. He was a member of the board until 1990. In 1985 he was appointed president of the emerging Mondragon Corporation, which he held until his retirement in 1990. He directed the Otalora Cooperative and Management Training Centre, which he had created during his time at Laboral Kutxa.

Between 1991 and 1992, he was executive vice-president of the Basque Government's Industrial Promotion and Reconversion Society (SPRI) and chairman of its venture capital company.

During his cooperative working life, from the creation of Ulgor until his retirement in 1987, he was Arizmendiarrieta's right-hand man and the one who put his ideas and projects into action. Arizmendiarrieta took care of the technical knowledge of the founders and their human, moral and spiritual education, and Ormaetxea developed firm convictions of service to the community.

Thus, in the first 20 years of the cooperative experience, they already had 82 companies employing 25,000 people, with Ormaetxea having participated in promoting almost all of them.

From the Business Division of Laboral Kutxa, he was a pioneer in the entrepreneurial vision, practices and management models that he applied to small cooperatives in their first steps, many years ahead of their application in Basque companies. He also saw the need for in-house research to avoid dependence on foreign patents and helped set up Ikerlan in 1974, the first research center with public-private partnerships. At Laboral Kutxa, he also promoted the establishment of the Otalora cooperative training center.

After his retirement, he created the Arizmendiarrieta Museum, encouraged the setting up of his Foundation, and prepared the papers for his Vatican canonization.

Frugal and honest, he was always faithful to Arizmendiarrieta's social ideology and leadership. When Arizmendiarrieta wanted to create the credit cooperative Laboral Kutxa in 1959, proposed Ormaetxea to open a humble first office with another employee and leave the position of manager of the successful industrial cooperative Ulgor:

"I accepted, even though I was unfamiliar with the banking business and barely knew how to read a balance sheet."

In the opinion of Iñigo Ucin, president of Corporación Mondragón:

"Ormaetxea belongs to a breed of outstanding cooperative men and women. Due to their talent and work capacity, people could have achieved high levels of personal wealth, but who placed their know-how at the service of the community and the development of our cooperative model".

== Creation of cooperatives ==
Following the founding of Ulgor, different projects were developed, and Ormaetxea took an active part in them, taking on many positions: co-founder and first manager of Ulgor, the first cooperative of the Mondragón Co-operative Group (1956-1962); chairman of the Board of Directors of the ULARCO Co-operative Group (1962-1970); general manager of "Laboral Kutxa", the credit cooperative (1960-1987), and chairman of the General Council of the Mondragón Co-operative Group, among others.

From the management of Laboral Kutxa, he made his most significant contribution to the Basque cooperative movement, getting involved in the creation of the Business Division of the savings bank. Under his leadership, he was the financial and management tool that made possible the impressive growth of the business group that would become the most important in the Basque Country and a world reference in the social economy.

== Later life ==
Ormaetxea was the first president of the Mondragón Cooperative Group from 1988 to 1990 and, subsequently, executive vice-president of SPRI. Once retired, he promoted the Arizmendiarrieta Classroom-Museum in Otalora, developed by himself in the early 1980s. He also headed the Postulation Commission for the Cause of Canonization of Arizmendiarrieta, of whom he considered himself a disciple and fan. With these efforts, he obtained the name of Father Arizmendiarrieta as "Venerable" by Pope Francis in December 2015. His convictions and his Christian testimony were recognized by Pope John Paul II, who in 2005 named him "Commander of the Order of St. Sylvester, Pope."

== Recognition ==
He was awarded the "Txemi Cantera" Social Economy Award, sponsored by the Labor Corporations, ASLE (1996), and the Lan Onari Award (1997) by the Basque Government. This last award recognizes Basques, who have distinguished themselves in an extraordinary way for their dedication, perseverance, and spirit of initiative in the performance of their professional activity.
