= Lan Onari =

Basque civil decoration

- Type: Civil medal
- Location: Basque Country
- Country: Spain
- Presented by: Lehendakari
- Established: 22 October 1996
- Total: 42
- Ribbon bar

Precedence
- Next (higher): Cross of the Tree of Gernika
- Next (lower): Lagun Onari

The Lan Onari (Basque for 'For the Good Work') award is a civil medal awarded in the Basque Country, Spain. It is awarded by the Basque Government to Basques "who have extraordinarily distinguished themselves due to their dedication, constancy, and innovative spirit in their field of work". It is the second highest distinction awarded by the Basque Government.

== Recipients ==
The following people have been awarded the medal:

- Juan Arregui Garay (1997)
- José María Ormaetxea (1997)
- José Ángel Sánchez Asiaín (1997)
- Luis Villasante (1997)
- Telmo Zarra (1997)
- Adrián Celaya Ibarra (2000)
- Juan Celaya Letamendi (2000)
- Eduardo Chillida (2000)
- Jorge Oteiza (2000)
- Micaela Portilla (2000)
- Jesús Altuna Etxabe (2002)
- Ainhoa Arteta (2002)
- Juan Mari Arzak (2002)
- Martín Ugalde (2002)
- Gaspar Vicinay (2002)
- Néstor Basterretxea (2005)
- Ángel Iglesias (2005)
- José María Aldekoa (2009)
- Juan María Bandrés (2009)
- Iñaki Gabilondo (2009)
- Edurne Pasaban (2009)
- Xabi Alonso (2010)
- Imanol Arias (2010)
- María Luisa Laka (2010)
- Manu Leguineche (2010)
- Patty Miller (2010)
- Javier Ormazabal (2010)
- Eduardo Anitua (2011)
- Juan Ángel Balbás (2011)
- Ana Blanco (2011)
- Martín Fiz (2011)
- Juan Pablo Fusi (2011)
- Milagros García Crespo (2011)
- Nely Carla Alberto (2012)
- Maialen Chourraut (2012)
- Patricia Elorza (2012)
- José Luis Novoa (2012)
- Richard Oribe (2012)
- Elisabeth Pinedo (2012)
- Ramiro Pinilla (2012)
- Ramon Saizarbitoria (2012)
- Maider Unda (2012)
