= Capital and the Debt Trap =

Book by Claudia Sanchez Bajo and Bruno Roelants

- Author: Claudia Sanchez Bajo; Bruno Roelants
- Subject: Co-operative economics
- Publisher: Palgrave Macmillan
- Publication date: 2011
- Pages: 274 pp.
- ISBN: 978-0-230-25238-7
- OCLC: 682891208

Capital and the Debt Trap is a research monograph by Claudia Sanchez Bajo and Bruno Roelants. The first four chapters provide a general summary of the economic instability afflicting the international economy at the time of publication (2011), noting that cooperatives have on average performed better than traditional for-profit corporations. The next four chapters describe four different cooperatives in four countries. The final chapter provides a summary. Cooperatives seem on average to last longer and be more responsive to the needs of customers and the communities in which they operate, because their shared ownership and participative management generally makes labor more flexible while reducing the incentives of upper management to maximize short-term performance at the expense of the long term.

== The Great Recession and cooperatives ==
The Great Recession was described as "The Mother of All Crises" with substantial wealth destruction for most people (ch. 1). The causes are attributed in part to three traps: consumption, liquidity and debt (ch. 2). Another contributor is the separation of ownership and control in modern corporations (ch. 3). This separation creates perverse incentives for senior managers to do things in their own short-term interests at the expense of the performance of their companies, stockholders, employees, and the communities in which they operate. This is particularly true when senior executives can make millions of dollars based on the short-term performance of their companies without having to return that money if the company subsequently fails due to behavior that is short sighted at best and often fraudulent. In many cases, this includes corruption in government described in Republic, Lost. This corruption has led to substantial deregulation of many industries, especially finance, which even extended to the "de facto decriminalization of elite financial fraud," in the words of William K. Black. Black was a lead litigator during the savings and loan crisis. As that crisis was building between 1980 and 1989, leading industry executives like Charles Keating spent lavishly on political campaign contributions. They were able to translate those contributions into actions by politicians that prevented regulators from filing criminal referrals. After the collapse of Ponzi schemes run by executives like Keating, regulators were finally allowed to investigate seriously and file thousands of criminal referrals that led to over a thousand criminal convictions of key S&L insiders. Black insists that the Great Recession was roughly 70 times worse than the S&L crisis. However, in the 2008 financial crisis, regulators did not file substantive criminal referrals in spite of substantive evidence of massive fraud by leading finance industry executives and the organizations they controlled.

Cooperatives, by contrast, have fewer problems with perverse incentives, because their ownership and control structures follow legal mandates promoted by the International Co-operative Alliance. These generally involve many more people in critical decisions (ch. 4). "[C]ooperatives tend to have a longer life than other types of enterprise, and thus a higher level of entrepreneurial sustainability. In [one study], the rate of survival of cooperatives after three years was 75 percent, whereas it was only 48 percent for all enterprises ... [and] after ten years, 44 percent of cooperatives were still in operation, whereas the ratio was only 20 percent for all enterprises." (p. 109)

== Case studies ==
The Natividad Island Divers' and Fishermen's Cooperative, founded in 1942, has survived over-exploitation of the marine habitat from which they extract their livelihood in part by partnering with researchers who help them improve their management of all their resources (ch. 5).

Ceralap is a French company producing ceramic insulators, founded as a private company in 1921. Beginning in 1989, they were purchased by a variety of international firms, the last of which worked to transfer their production to a different legal entity in a lower-wage country and bankrupt what was left. Beginning in 2002, the workers became aware of this trend, organized, prevented the transfer of some specialized equipment, and raised the capital needed to buy the company and convert it into a cooperative (ch. 6).

The Desjardins banking cooperative was founded in 1900 to provide financial support to French Canadians, who lacked adequate access to banking services, previously in the hands of anglophone Canadians. It has since grown to become the largest association of credit unions in North America, helping their members survive the Great Depression and other financial problems.(ch. 7)

The Mondragon Cooperative Group is one of the largest cooperatives in the world. It was founded in 1956 to support entrepreneurial ventures by graduates from a technical school in the Basque region of Spain. Three years later, they established the Caja Laboral credit union to help its members finance further cooperative efforts. It has grown relatively steadily from its founding, surviving successive waves of globalization that bankrupted many weaker Spanish companies. It has done this by developing a rigorous entrepreneurial approach while focusing on sustainable jobs, education and training to support society more generally.(ch. 8)

== Cooperatives and stable economic growth ==
In sum, the long-term interests of society are not well served by the neoliberal economic model that seems to dominate the international economy currently, because it seems to produce perverse incentives and economic bubbles that too often destroy wealth, at least for the vast majority of people. Cooperatives, on the other hand, have shown themselves to be more steady and stable mechanisms for creating wealth for greater numbers of people. "Cooperative banks build up counter-cyclical buffers that function well in case of a crisis," and are less likely to lead members and clients towards a debt trap.(p. 216) "Housing cooperatives, whether organized around home rental or ownership, considerably contribute to avoiding housing bubbles, such as that of the sub-prime in the" United States that was a major source of the Great Recession. "[H]ousing crises have been weaker or non-existent in countries where the housing cooperative system is particularly strong, such as Germany or Norway.(p. 217) ... [D]emocratic checks and balances, if properly managed, have proven not to be a cost but ... a long-term strategic investment."(p. 221)
