= Fagor (cycling team) =

Cycling teams sponsored by Fagor include:

- Fagor (cycling team, 1966–1969), known as Fagor from 1966 to 1969
- Mercier (cycling team), known as Fagor–Mercier–Hutchinson in 1970 and 1971
- Fagor (cycling team, 1985–1989), known as Fagor from 1985 to 1989
