= Pradeep S Mehta =

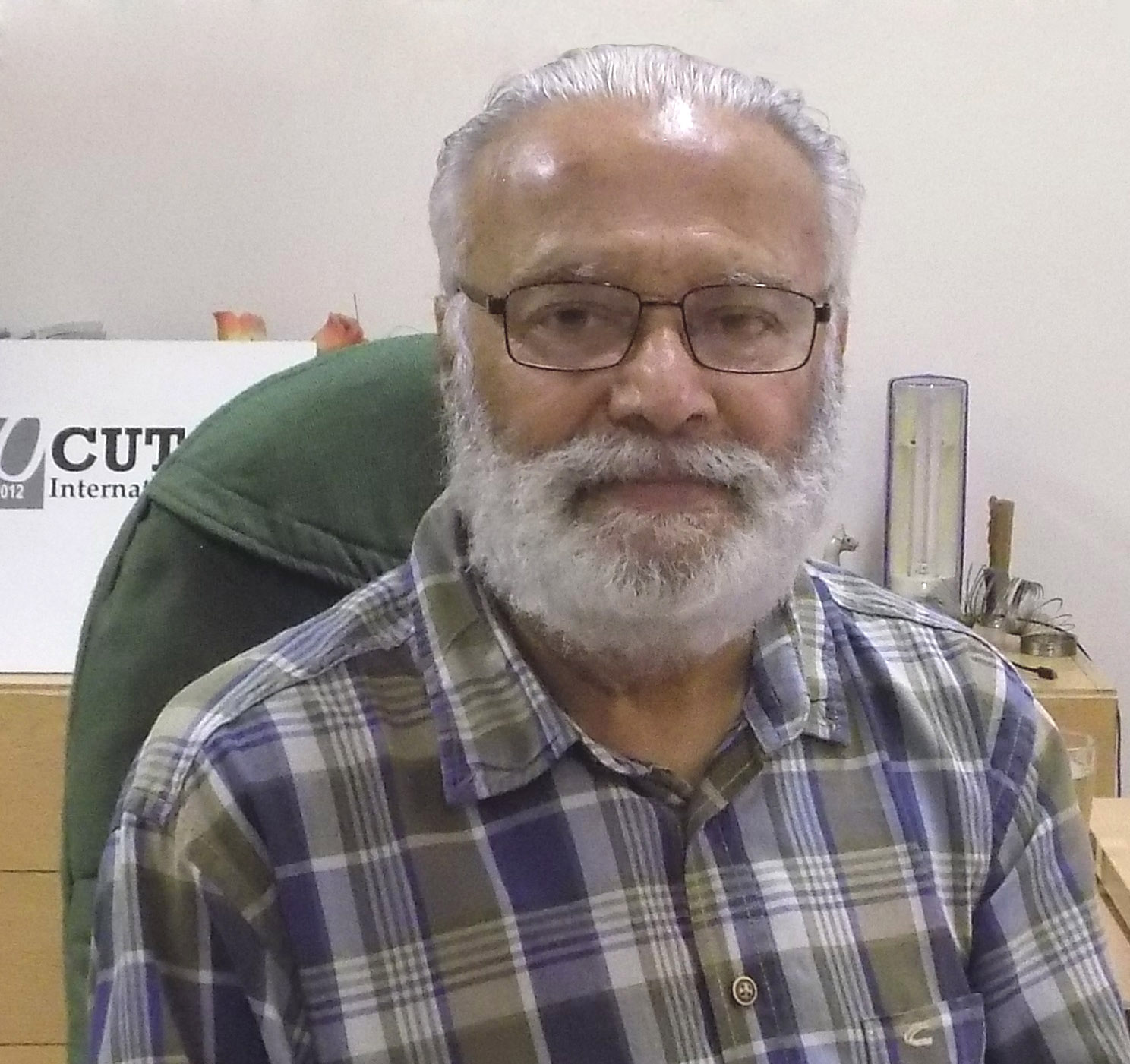
- Secretary General, CUTS International
- Occupations: Author and Columnist
- Writing career
- Language: Hindi/English
- Website: www.pradeepsmehta.com

Pradeep S. Mehta is the Secretary General of Consumer Unity & Trust Society (CUTS), a non-profit organisation that focuses on providing the poor with access to developmental opportunities. Mehta founded CUTS in 1983 and helped the organisation establish its presence in seven countries around the world. Mehta has been an active member of high-level panels on policies for World Trade Organisation (WTO) and the Government of India.

Mehta is also a regular author of books that discuss policies and regulations. He serves as a featured columnist with several leading publications.

== Career ==
Mehta's journey with CUTS began in the 80s with the launch of a Hindi monthly wall newspaper known as Gram Gadar. This paper served as a mouthpiece that helped the poor understand the governmental schemes targeted at them. Gram Gadar's success inspired Mehta to expand his focus – he worked towards ensuring the poor have access to basic amenities, education and equal rights.

Today, CUTS International has a major presence in India through centres that help resolve developmental challenges faced by societies. The organisation also has a presence in Switzerland, Vietnam, Ghana, Kenya, Zambia and the US.

Mehta's notable books include 'Economic Diplomacy: India’s Ascendancy in the 21st Century', 'Supreme Court and the Indian Economy: A Story of Economic Impact of Six Landmark Cases of the Supreme Court', 'Evolution of Competition Laws and their Enforcement: A Political Economy Perspective', 'Towards a Functional Competition Policy for India', 'Politics Triumphs Economics?: Political Economy and the Implementation of Competition Law and Economic Regulation in Developing Countries', 'Essays on the International Trading System: An Unfinished Journey', 'Reflections from the Frontline: Developing Country Negotiators in the WTO', among others. Mehta is also a regular columnist with most of India's leading national papers, including The Economic Times, The Hindu Business Line and Mint.

Two Festschrift's have been published in his honour by the name of ‘Growth and Equity’ edited by Nitin Desai in 2013 and 'Putting Consumers First' in 2018 by Sanjaya Baru respectively.

Mehta is a Member of the WTO DG’s NGO Advisory Board, for the third time. He also serves on the G20/B20’s Council on Africa’s Economic Integration. He has also served on the GOI’s Board of Trade; Better Regulatory Advisory Group; Steering Committee on Ecomark etc.

Recently, he has been conferred with the SKOCH Challenger Award for his contribution to Public Policy on Competition. This is the third such award that he has received for his work on Competition Policy & Law. The earlier two were the M. R. Pai Award and the Scindia School's Madhav Award for a Distinguished Old Boy. Mehta has also been nominated to a high-level Environment Committee of the World Mining Congress, 2023 organised by the University of Queensland, Brisbane, Australia. In September 2023, he was conferred the prestigious BusinessWorld Social Impact Award.

The esteemed magazine Insights Success has featured Mehta, highlighting his role in 'Advancing Consumer Welfare and Promoting Economic Democracy in the Global South through CUTS International.'

== Personal life ==
Mehta is married to former entrepreneur Aruna Mehta. They have two children. Mehta completed his schooling at Scindia School, Gwalior in 1965. He then graduated from St. Xavier's College, Calcutta in 1968. He also studied his L.L.B. from Rajasthan University, Jaipur in 1975 but did not write the final exams.
