= Brian Krolicki =

American businessman and politician

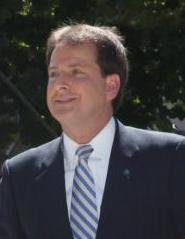

Member of the Nevada Gaming Commission
- Incumbent
- Assumed office January 2, 2023
- Appointed by: Joe Lombardo
- Preceded by: Ben Kieckhefer

33rd Lieutenant Governor of Nevada
- In office January 1, 2007 – January 5, 2015
- Governor: Jim Gibbons; Brian Sandoval
- Preceded by: Lorraine Hunt
- Succeeded by: Mark Hutchison

20th Treasurer of Nevada
- In office January 4, 1999 – January 20, 2007
- Governor: Kenny Guinn; Jim Gibbons
- Preceded by: Bob Seale
- Succeeded by: Kate Marshall

Personal details
- Born: Brian Keith Krolicki; December 31, 1960 (age 65) Warwick, Rhode Island, U.S.
- Party: Republican
- Spouse: Kelly Krolicki
- Education: Stanford University (BA)

Brian Keith Krolicki (Note: Pronounced /ˈkroʊlɪˌki/ KROH-lih-kee.) (born December 31, 1960) is an American businessman and politician who is a member of the Nevada Gaming Commission since 2023. He was the 33rd lieutenant governor of Nevada, from 2007 to 2015. As the Lieutenant Governor, he presided over the Nevada State Senate, chaired the Commission on Tourism, and served on the State Board of Transportation and the Reno Tahoe Winter Games Coalition. Previously, he served two terms as the Nevada State Treasurer. He is a member of the Republican Party. Krolicki was not eligible to run for a third term in 2014 due to lifetime term limits by the Nevada Constitution.

== Education ==
Krolicki is a graduate of Stanford University, where he graduated in 1983 with a degree in political science.

== Professional life ==
Preceding his election as State Treasurer, Krolicki worked for Bankers Trust in New York City, and Smith Barney in San Francisco and Manama, Bahrain.

== Political career ==
=== State treasurer ===
Krolicki was elected state treasurer in 1998. During his tenure, Krolicki worked to make college education more affordable, and considered it "a cornerstone of his administration." He created the State Treasurer's College Savings Plan and Nevada's Prepaid College Tuition Program, and oversaw the set-up of the Gates Scholarship in Nevada.

Along his work in higher-education accessibility, Krolicki obtained upgrades from credit-rating agencies for Nevada, saving taxpayers millions of dollars in interest payments. All rating agencies now consider Nevada just a notch below AAA, the highest and most coveted rating, and held by very few states. Krolicki was also the first state treasurer in the United States to receive the coveted Certificate of Excellence in Investment Policy from the Association of Public Treasurers of the United States and Canada. Krolicki also formulated and implemented many investment programs that obtained tens of millions of dollars in revenue for the state.

On the national level, in 2002, Brian was unanimously elected by his peers to serve as president of the National Association of State Treasurers (NAST), which collectively represents over $1 trillion in assets. As president, he founded the NAST Committee on Corporate Governance and served as chairman of the NAST Foundation, which promotes financial literacy and education throughout the nation. He has worked hard to promote financial literacy in Nevada by introducing the Nevada Women's Money Conference, a free event designed to provide the necessary tools and information to become financially educated. In May 2004, Brian was selected by his state treasurer colleagues to receive the Unruh Award, given to the nation's most outstanding state treasurer. Most recently, in December 2004, Brian was again honored by his national peers in both the private and public sectors with the highly regarded Gritz Award for Excellence in Public Finance in recognition of his leadership and innovation in the area of public debt management.

=== Lieutenant governor ===
In 2006, Krolicki was elected Lieutenant Governor of Nevada. He was re-elected in 2010.

== Prosecution by Nevada Attorney General ==
On December 3, 2008, Krolicki was indicted on four felony counts. The charges were related to Krolicki's management of a multibillion-dollar college savings program in his previous position as Nevada's state treasurer. Two of the counts were of misappropriation and falsification of accounts by a public officer, and two counts were of misappropriation by a treasurer. He faced up to four years in prison on each of the four counts for a maximum of sixteen years. Krolicki said there was no basis for the charges and called them a partisan political tactic by Democratic Attorney General Catherine Cortez Masto and U.S. Senate Majority Leader Harry Reid.

A Las Vegas judge later dismissed the charges, exonerating Krolicki and his Chief of Staff Kathy Besser.

== Awards ==
On July 26, 2010, the lehendakari of the Basque Country gave him the Lagun Onari (to the best friend) basque prize in the state visit of the lehendakari Patxi López to the United States. In February 2024, Krolicki was awarded as a Peace Laureate of the Sino-Phil Asia International Peace Awards Foundation in Manila, Philippines in recognition of his contribution to public service.

== Notes ==
Political offices
Preceded by Bob Seale	Treasurer of Nevada; 1999–2007	Succeeded by Kate Marshall
Preceded by Lorraine Hunt	Lieutenant Governor of Nevada; 2007–2015	Succeeded by Mark Hutchison
