= Fagor Automation =

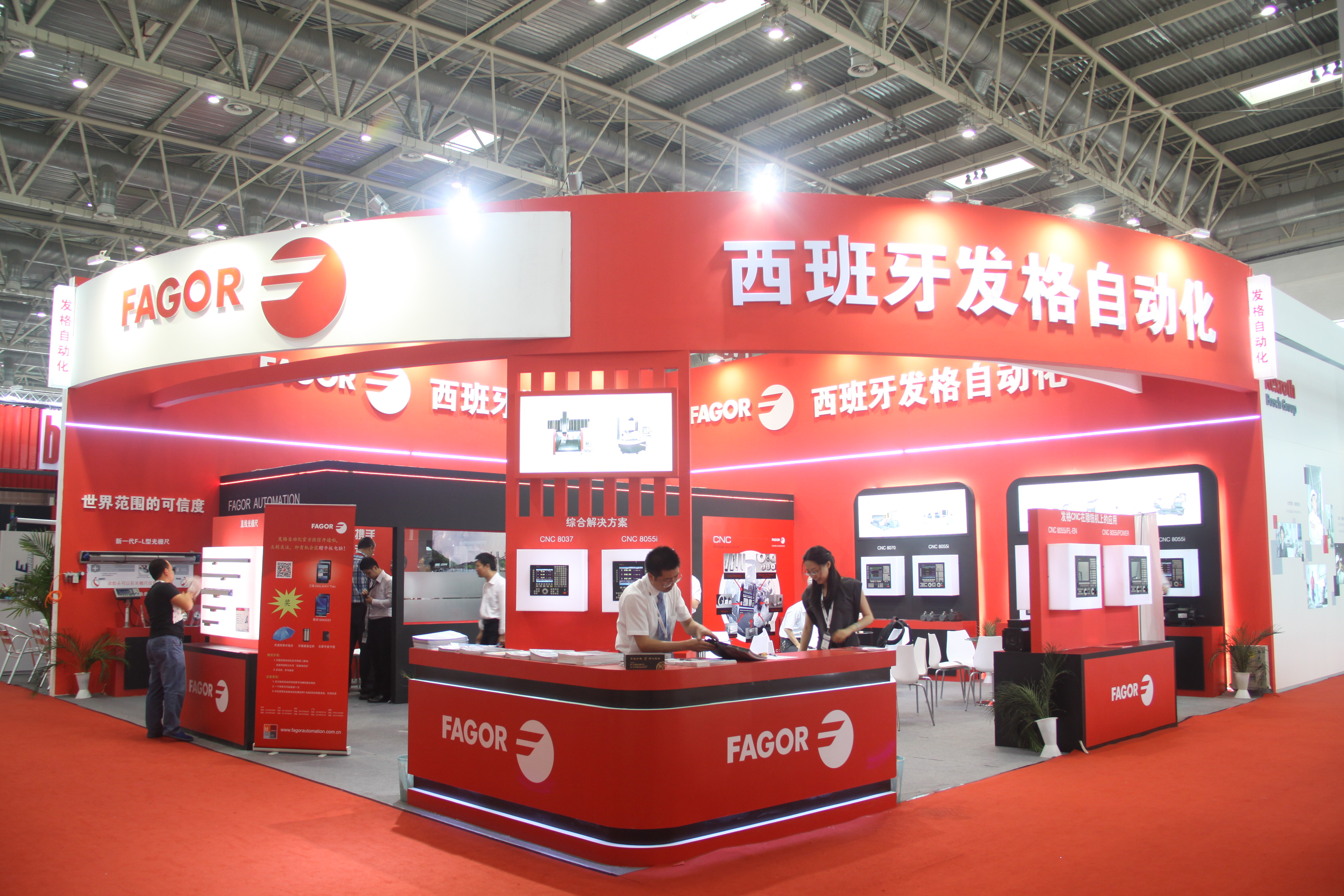
- Fagor Automation stand at CIMES 2014.
- Type: Cooperative
- Industry: Electronics and programming
- Founded: 1980
- Founder: Fagor
- Headquarters: San Andrés 19, P.O. Box 144, 20500 Arrasate-Mondragón, Basque Country, Spain
- Key people: José Pérez Berdud (manager)
- Products: Numerical control
- Net income: €61 million (2016)
- Number of employees: 400 in the Basque Country, 230 abroad
- Parent: Mondragon Corporation
- Website: fagorautomation.com

Fagor Automation is a Basque company of the Mondragon Corporation dedicated to the design and manufacture of computer numerical control systems for machine tools, including both hardware and software. Founded in 1980 and headquartered in Arrasate-Mondragón, Spain, it is the fifth-largest manufacturer of CNC systems worldwide.

== History ==
The origins of the cooperative lie in the 1980s, in the automation department of Fagor Electrónica. It initially became known as Aurki, and later changed its name to Fagor Automation. It is the fifth-largest manufacturer of computer numerical control (CNC) systems worldwide.
