= Cross of the Tree of Gernika =

Basque civil decoration

- Type: Civil medal
- Location: Basque Country
- Country: Spain
- Presented by: Lehendakari
- Established: 2 May 1983
- Total: 9
- Ribbon bars for Basques and non-Basques

Precedence
- Next (lower): Lan Onari

The Cross of the Tree of Gernika (Basque: Gernikako Arbolaren Gurutzea, Spanish: Cruz del Árbol de Gernika) is a civil medal awarded in the Basque Country, Spain. It is awarded by the Basque Government to people "who have distinguished themselves in their services to the Basque Country in defense of its identity and the restoration of its personality; and generally in social, economic and cultural fields". It is the highest distinction awarded by the Basque Government.

== Recipients ==
The following people have been awarded the cross:

- Miguel Herńandez Ocanto, Governor of the Federal District of Venezuela (16 May 1983)
- Jesús María Leizaola, former Lehendakari (14 August 1986)
- Manuel Lekuona, former president of Euskaltzaindia (6 August 1987, posthumous)
- Jose Migel Barandiaran, anthropologist (15 December 1987)
- Rafael Caldera, president of Venezuela (4 July 1995)
- Ramón Rubial, former president of the Basque General Council (3 February 1998)
- José Antonio Aguirre, former Lehendakari (2 March 2010, posthumous)
- Carlos Garaikoetxea, former Lehendakari (18 October 2011)
- José Antonio Ardanza, former Lehendakari (2 October 2012)
