= Edesa =

Spanish home appliance brand

Edesa S.A.
- Company type: Private
- Industry: Home appliances
- Founded: 1941; 85 years ago
- Headquarters: Mondragón, Spain
- Area served: Europe (Mainly Spain and Portugal), United States, South America, Asia
- Parent: Fagor
- Website: edesausa.com

Edesa S.A is a Spanish manufacturer of domestic and commercial appliances. After 60 years, it became a popular product in other countries. It is currently one of the top five brands in Spain in its sector.

== Product range ==
Edesa produces kitchen appliances, such as ovens, cookers, refrigerators and its biggest product, washing machines and tumble dryers. In 2008 it created four brands of ranges, Romantic, Pop Collection, Sports Collection and Metallic.

== History ==
The Edesa brand was created in 1941. The brand had had a successful record, and in 1989 became part of Fagor. It is now part of the CNA Group.
