= Laboral Kutxa =

Credit union in the Basque Country, Spain

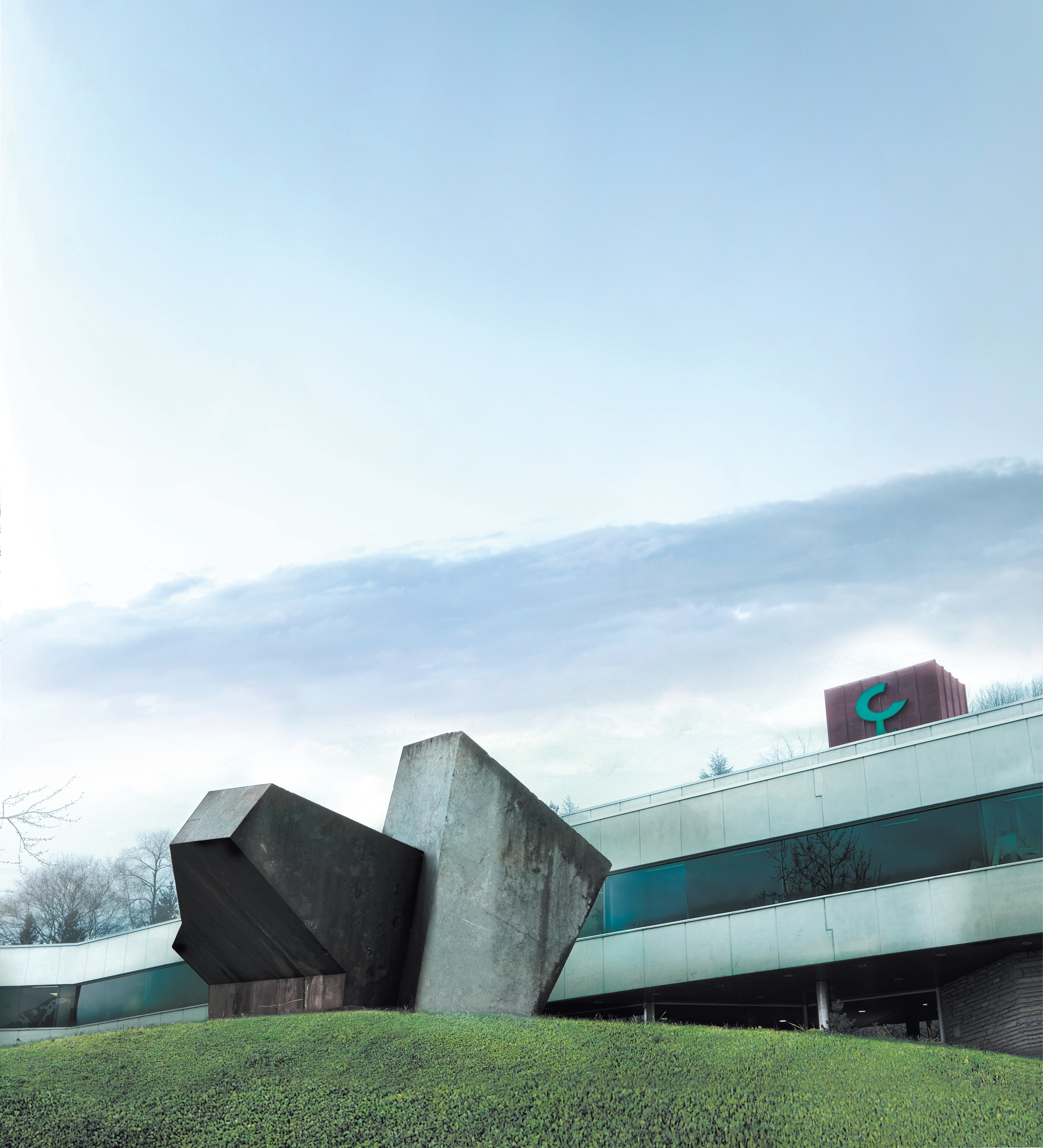
- Laboral Kutxa Central Office
- Industry: Financial services
- Predecessor: Caja Laboral, Ipar Kutxa
- Founded: 2012; 14 years ago
- Headquarters: Mondragón, Spain
- Number of locations: 380 branches
- Key people: Txomin García (Chairman), Xabier Eguibar (CEO)
- Products: Retail, corporate, investment banking and private banking, insurance, asset management, private equity
- Net income: 36.7 million euros (2013 First Quarter)
- Total assets: 24,400 million euros
- Number of employees: 2,235 (2013)
- Website: www.laboralkutxa.com

Laboral Kutxa is a Basque credit union that provides banking, savings and investment services.

It was created in March 2012 as a result of the merger of two smaller credit unions. The Caja Laboral Popular Sociedad Cooperativa de Crédito (known as Caja Laboral in Spanish or Euskadiko Kutxa in Basque) and Ipar Kutxa Rural Sociedad Cooperativa de Crédito (known as Ipar Kutxa). The merger project was announced in March 2012 and completed eight months later, in September 2012, with an officially launch in April 2013.

As of 2013, it is also the third largest financial institution in the Basque Country (after Kutxabank and BBVA).

== History ==
=== Caja Laboral – Euskadiko Kutxa ===
Caja Laboral – Euskadiko Kutxa was founded in 1959 by José María Arizmendiarrieta, a young catholic priest who had arrived to the small town of Mondragón in 1943 and had since then stablished a technical college and had helped create a few co-operatives, such as ULGOR (later known as Fagor), Funcor (currently Fagor Ederlan), Arrasate (currently Fagor Arrasate) and the San Jose Consumer's Cooperative (later and nowadays known as Eroski).

Those co-operatives would be the first members of what is now called the Mondragon Corporation and, according to Arizmendiarrieta's plan, the credit union would serve as a financial instrument for them. Caja Laboral-Euskadiko Kutxa not only played an important role in the creation of the Mondragon Corporation, but also in its development.

For five decades, its "Companies Division" acted as a promoter for new co-operatives. In the seventies, the union gave loans with benefits to the cooperatives that were in difficulties due to the reorganizing of Basque industry and the two energy crises in 1973 and 1979 when unemployment rates were up to 20% in the Basque Country. Caja Laboral's motto at the time was "libreta o maleta", meaning being in the union ("libreta") was the only way to avoid forced migration ("maleta" – suitcase).

Not only was Caja Laboral a credit union but also a workers' co-operative, which meant that its workers had a full right to participate both in the company's decisions and its benefits. Before its merging with Ipar Kutxa, Caja Laboral had 1.887 working members, 21.536 million euros in assets, 1.200.000 clients and 367 offices in the Basque Country and Spain. It was the first European financial institution in getting the Gold 'Q’ Basque Award in Management. In 2006 the union supported the United Nations Global Compact.

=== Ipar Kutxa ===
It began as Caja Rural Provincial de Vizcaya, in 1965, and was founded mainly by two co-operatives, the dairy co-op Beyena (that literally means "the one of the cows" in Basque) and Uteco, a farmers co-operative. In 1980 the union changed names to Caja Rural Provincial de Vizcaya, Sdad. Coop. Cto. Ltda and six years later, after avoiding bankruptcy thanks to the intervention of the Bank of Spain it became Caja Rural Vasca (or Baserritarren Kutxa in Basque) and began to grow outside Biscay.

En 1997, it slightly changed names again to become Caja Rural Vasca, S. Coop. de Crédito and failed a hostile takeover of Bankoa Crédit Agricole. In 2003, it opened its first offices in Gipuzkoa and officially became Ipar Kutxa ("union of the North" in basque).

When it merged with Caja Laboral, Ipar Kutxa had 3.967 million in assets, 87 offices (mainly in Biscay and Alava), 175,000 clients and 397 workers (fuente).

== 2012 merger process ==
In March 2012, Caja Laboral and Ipar Kutxa announced the beginning of formal conversations to its merging. They aimed to "strengthen a financial institution of social economy, that would provide services in its current market based on an alternative model to the one resulting in Spain as a result of the banking process of credit unions". The merged company would be the first credit union and the third largest financial institution in the Basque Country (after Kutxabank and BBVA). It would also make the second biggest credit union in Spain, with 750,000 clients in the Basque Country, 110,000 in Navarre and more than 1,300,000 total. The merging was a gradual process. Between March and November 2012 all operations between companies were made free of charge for clients, IT services became one and older workers were offered early retirement. The merging was completed the first of November but resulting union kept the name Caja Laboral – Euskadiko Kutxa until June 2013, when it announced its new brand, Laboral Kutxa.

== Economic and financial indicators ==
Laboral Kutxa is the first credit union in the Basque Country and the third largest in Spain. It is also the third largest financial institution in the Basque Country (after Kutxabank and BBVA). As of 2013, it had approximately 750.000 clients in the Basque Country and another 110.000 in Navarre, making 1.300.000 total. It employed 2.500 workers and held 24.564 million euros in assets. It has another 650 million euros invested in its social capital and 1.379 million euros in its funds.

== Management ==
Like Caja Laboral and Ipar Kutxa, Laboral Kutxa is a workers' co-operative. As such, it is obliged to follow Spanish Co-operative Law and the general regulation of worker co-operatives. Although it has no restrictions to perform as a financial institution to its clients it must pay special attention to the needs of its own workers. Operations with third parties cannot make for more than 50% of the company's total assets.

All workers in Laboral Kutxa are members of the company and had a vote in the General Assembly. Those clients with a strong commitment with the union can also become members if they wish to: in February 2013 Laboral Kutxa allowed them to do so with a small contribution (2.000 euros). These are the people currently in Laboral Kutxa's board of direction

- President: Txomin García
- Chief executive officer: Xabier Eguibar

== Offices ==
Laboral Kutxa has approximately 400 offices in the Basque Country, Navarre, Aragón, La Rioja, Castile and León, Cantabria, Asturias and Madrid.

== Marketing and communication ==
For decades, Caja Laboral had used the symbol of a key for branding while Ipar Kutxa had no distinct image apart from its initials or full name. During its merging process, Laboral Kutxa worked with two labels – Euskadiko Kutxa and Ipar Kutxa – and used the corporate colors associated with them – deep red and lime green. They are currently the most notable colors both in the company's logo, its offices and all of its publicity.

== See also ==
- List of banks in Spain
- List of banks in the euro area
- List of European cooperative banks
