= Republic Windows and Doors =

Defunct manufacturing company in Chicago, Illinois, USA (1965–2012)

Republic Windows and Doors is based in Chicago, Illinois. The company was founded in 1965 by William Spielman. The company was declared bankrupt on December 2, 2008. The property was put under the control of its major creditors, Bank of America and JPMorgan Chase.

== History ==
Public records show that shortly before the closure of Republic Windows the owners purchased Echo Windows and Doors, a non-unionized window factory in Red Oak, Iowa. The union at Republic Windows later filed charges against this action.

=== Bankruptcy ===
Several months before the bankruptcy announcement, workers at the company's Goose Island warehouse had noticed that key pieces of equipment were being removed. The leaders of United Electrical, Radio and Machine Workers of AmericaUE (UE) Local 1110, workers in the factory, contacted the national union, concerned that the plant was going to be closed. Despite company assurances that the missing machinery had merely been removed to make way for more modern equipment, the union began covertly monitoring the plant. One night, while monitoring the plant, UE Local 1110 President and Republic maintenance worker Armando Robles and UE union organizer Mark Meinster planned a strategy to occupy the factory in the event of a plant closing.

On December 3, 2008, the executives of the company announced to its workers that it would end operations on December 5 due to Bank of America, its main lender, canceling its line of credit due to a severe downturn in business at the plant.

When the company's 260 employees learned that the plant was indeed closing permanently on December 2, 2008, they came to collect their paychecks. The company informed them that the employees would not be compensated for their accrued sick or vacation days and that their health insurance would be terminated on December 5.

The union lodged a complaint that the company was acting in violation of the WARN Act, a federal law that requires companies to give workers 60 days' notice before mass layoffs. In total, the union claimed that the workers were owed US$1.5 million in vacation and severance pay, as well as an extension in their medical benefits.

On December 15, 2008, the company filed for Chapter 7 bankruptcy.

In February 2009, Serious Materials, a Sunnyvale, California-based company that produces environmentally friendly building materials, announced that it had purchased the buildings and assets of Republic Windows. The company announced that it intended to hire back all of the former factory workers.

== Controversy ==
=== Sitdown strikes ===
Beginning on the day of the closure, 200 of the 240 workers of the Goose Island factory began an organized sitdown strike to protest alleged violation of federal labor law by Republic in that the company did not give the workers 60 days notice prior to the announcement of closure (this, however, was allegedly based upon the lack of lending from Bank of America).

The sit-in lasted until the workers reached a settlement with the factory over severance, vacation time, and temporary health care benefits; the settlement, which was reached on December 11 and amounted to over $1.75 million, was negotiated by the United Electrical, Radio and Machine Workers of America (of whose Local 1110 branch the workers were members), Republic owners and Bank of America over three days.

On December 10, Bank of America and JPMorgan Chase agreed to create a $1.75 million fund to pay the workers their back pay and benefits and to provide two months of health insurance coverage.

Michael Moore producer Eric Weinrib spent six days in the factory with the workers, sleeping on the floor of the locker room, filming the sitdown strike as it unfolded and until it ended. Moore's crew was the only camera allowed inside the factory during the sitdown strike, which is featured prominently in Moore's 2009 film Capitalism: A Love Story.

Kari Lydersen's blog on the sit-in was expanded into a book titled Revolt on Goose Island. The book was released in June 2009.

On February 23, 2012, about 65 workers initiated a second sit-in strike of Serious Materials (formerly Republic Windows and Doors). The occupation was in response to factory owners Serious Energy's announcement that it would be closing the factory and consolidating operations in Colorado and Pennsylvania. Workers ended the occupation at approximately 2 AM on February 24, 2012, after owners agreed to keep the factory open for 90 days. United Electrical, Radio and Machine Workers of America Local 1110 president Armando Robles said that he wanted workers to own and operate the plant themselves. Robles and other former Republic and Serious workers have now formed a worker cooperative that makes replacement windows, called New Era Windows.

=== Criminal charges ===
In September 2009, Cook County prosecutors charged that the sudden plant closing in December 2008 was part of a plot by CEO Richard Gillman, the head of Republic Windows. The prosecutors said that Gillman and two other undisclosed executives secretly trucked 10 semitrailers full of window manufacturing equipment from the plant, moving three trailers of equipment to Red Oak, Iowa. On January 1, 2009, Gillman took over a Red Oak window company that had been operating since 1985. But in February 2009 that company closed as well, laying off 120 employees.

In December 2013, Gillman was sentenced to four years in prison for stealing $500,000 from Republic Windows and Doors.

== See also ==
- Occupation of factories
