= Bob Seale =

American politician

Member of the Nevada Assembly from the 21st district
- In office November 3, 2004 – November 8, 2006
- Preceded by: Walter Andonov
- Succeeded by: Bob Beers

19th Treasurer of Nevada
- In office January 7, 1991 – January 4, 1999
- Governor: Bob Miller
- Preceded by: Ken Santor
- Succeeded by: Brian Krolicki

Personal details
- Born: October 4, 1941 (age 84)
- Party: Republican

Bob Seale (born October 4, 1941) is an American politician who served as the Treasurer of Nevada from 1991 to 1999 and in the Nevada Assembly from the 21st district from 2004 to 2006.
