= New Era Windows =

American worker cooperative

New Era Windows is an American worker cooperative formed by Chicago union members seeking to purchase their workplace, a window manufacturing plant located on Goose Island.

== History ==
The plant, was originally owned by Republic Windows and Doors and then purchased by Serious Energy, assembles vinyl windows and sliding doors. The workers have twice occupied the plant in their struggle to secure their wages and maintain their jobs.

Towards the end of 2008, after Bank of America discontinued Republic Windows and Doors' credit line, Republic closed the Chicago factory. Following the sudden closure of the factory, workers were fired with only three days' notice, violating the WARN Act. The WARN Act requires 60 days' notice of a plant closing, or 60 days' pay if timely notice is not given.

Workers and members of the UE Local 1110 organized and decided to stage an occupation of the factory in protest of the firings. On December 5, 2008, the plant was occupied by workers for six days, drawing comparisons to the autoworkers strikes of the 1930s. The workers' action drew extensive media coverage and attracted wide support. President Barack Obama said that Republic should follow through on its commitment to the plant's employees and Illinois Attorney General Lisa Madigan launched an investigation into violations of the WARN Act. Illinois Governor Rod Blagojevich banned state business with Bank of America, because the bank's cancellation of the company's line of credit had prompted the shutdown. Protest demonstrations at Bank of America branches took place in dozens of U.S. cities during the sit-in. On December 10 the union members voted to end the occupation after Republic, Bank of America, JPMorgan Chase, and the union negotiated a settlement that paid each worker eight weeks wages, plus all accumulated vacation pay, and health insurance for two months.

The workers and their struggle were featured in Michael Moore's 2009 documentary Capitalism: A Love Story.

In February 2012 Serious Energy management announced the plant's immediate closing. The news was unexpected and the union responded in the same way it had four years prior. On February 23, 2012, workers represented by the UE Local 1110 and supported by organizers from Occupy Chicago occupied the factory again for 11 hours. Despite its drastic diminution—Serious Energy had called back 75 of the plant's 250 employees, with only 38 employed by the closing's announcement—workers successfully negotiated an agreement with management by that night. Assistance and publicity coincided with the Occupy movement in Chicago, members of which came to the plant. The union agreed to 90 days of employment before the plants closing.

== Funding ==
Two months later, California window manufacturer Serious Materials (now Serious Energy) bought out Republic Windows and Doors for $1.45 million and reopened the plant, reinstating the union workers to their jobs in order of seniority and signing a labor contract with UE Local 1110 that was substantially the same as the union's former contract with Republic. In April 2009 Vice President Joe Biden visited the plant and met with company officials and union leaders, praising the reopening of the plant as "a big deal."

On May 30, 2012, workers from the factory incorporated as a worker-run cooperative. They are trying to secure an equitable price for the factory's machinery in their negotiations with Serious Energy and their financiers, Mesirow Financial. The workers raised $520,000 and made an offer of $1.2 million for the purchase of the factory.
