= Lagun Onari =

Basque civil decoration

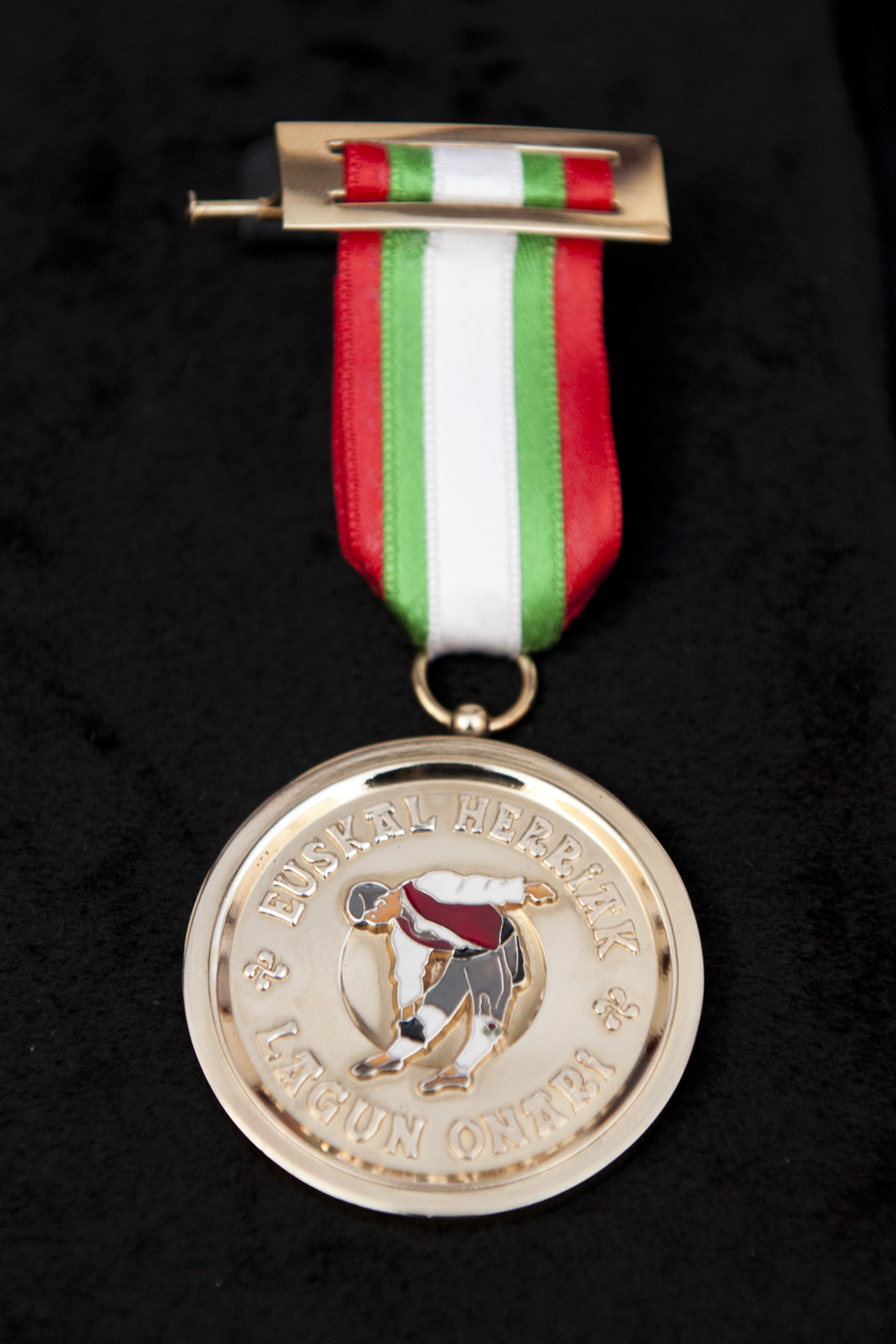
- Type: Civil medal/plaque
- Location: Basque Country
- Country: Spain
- Presented by: Lehendakari
- Established: 22 October 1996
- Total: 13
- Ribbon bar

Precedence
- Next (higher): Lan Onari

The Lagun Onari (Basque for 'To the Good Friend') award is a civil decoration awarded in the Basque Country, Spain. It is awarded by the Basque Government to non-Basque people and entities "who have benefited significantly the Basque Country or its economy, or have increased the public awareness of Basque history and culture abroad". It is the third highest distinction awarded by the Basque Government. People are awarded a medal, while entities are awarded a plaque.

== Recipients ==
The following people and entities have been awarded the decoration:

- Julio María Sanguinetti, president of Uruguay (1997)
- Eduardo Frei Ruiz-Tagle, president of Chile (1998)
- William A. Douglas (1999)
- Francesco Cossiga, president of Italy (2001)
- Václav Havel, president of the Czech Republic (2001)
- Idaho (2005)
- Argentina (2006)
- Mexico (2009)
- Nevada (2005)
- José Ignacio Sánchez Galán, businessman (2011)
- France (2012)
- Selma Barkham, historian (2014)
- EuroBasque, (2018)
