= Union co-op model =

Autonomous organization of workers with common goals

A unionized co-operative is a co-operative which is beholden to active legal involvement by trade unions in the representation of the worker-owners' interests.

While they may be considered unnecessary in most cases, trade union involvement and membership may be welcomed by some co-operatives, be it to show voluntary solidarity with the organized labor movement's own history of struggle or to allow workers to negotiate collectively for the furtherance of workers' special interests within the more democratic and representative co-operative.

The labor contract negotiated becomes the baseline of benefits due to the membership and guarantees to the community that the working conditions are not unfavorable. Union membership for worker co-operatives gives the enterprise a legitimate standard of operations.

Firms converting to worker ownership may benefit from union membership because a union provides an experienced structure for integrating the needs of business with democratic influence from workers on management decisions.

== Difference from Union-backed ESOPs ==
ESOPs are not the same as full-fledged worker co-operatives, as ESOPs still retain a structure which is a mixture of private and co-operative elements.
