= Kerala Dinesh =

Indian worker co-op in Kannur, Kerala

- Formerly: Kerala Dinesh Beedi
- Company type: Cooperative
- Industry: Food Processing, Beedi, Clothing, Software
- Founded: 1969; 57 years ago
- Headquarters: Kannur, Kerala, India
- Products: Apparels; Software; Food products; Umbrella
- Website: www.keraladinesh.com

Kerala Dinesh BWCCS Ltd., doing business as Kerala Dinesh, is an Indian worker cooperative based in Kannur, Kerala.

== History ==
The Cooperative was launched in 1969 with the help of assistance from T. V. Thomas, Minister for Industries in Second E. M. S. Namboodiripad ministry. This cooperative came up as a result of workers' resistance against the exploitation of private capital. From the 1940s the organised labour movement in Kerala has demanded the implementation of special legislation to help beedi workers from the misery of exploitation. The initiatives of A. K. Gopalan pressurised the Nehru Government to introduce Beedi and Cigar Workers (Conditions of Employment Act) in 1966. However, the decision to implement the Act was left to the choice of state government. This Act was implemented by Second E. M. S. Namboodiripad ministry, hence Kerala became the first state to implement it. This provoked the private beedi companies like Ganesh Beedi and they shifted their operation from Kerala to Karnataka. This left thousands of workers unemployed. As negotiations with the company failed, the trade union movement in Kerala put forth the idea of developing a cooperative. As a result, the cooperative was inaugurated in 1969.

The E.M.S. ministry invested ₹13.5 lakhs as share capital and sanctioned a huge working capital loan of ₹700,000 to initiate the functioning of this cooperative.

G. K. Panicker IAS, the then Joint Commissioner of Industries Department played a crucial leadership role in shaping the institution.

In the mid-seventies, Dinesh Beedi achieved a significant portion of Indian tobacco market and they increased their profit from ₹50,000 in 1969 to ₹44 crore by 1994-95. With a 70 times increase in production it reached 6.85 billion beedis per year during the nineties.

== Awards ==
- Fair Business Practice Award 2014 instituted by the ASSOCHAM (Associated Chamber of Commerce & Industry of India).
- Fair Business Practice Award 2015 instituted by the ASSOCHAM.
- ICAI Award 2015 instituted by Institute of Chartered Accountants of India.
