= Citybikes Workers' Cooperative =

Bike shop in Portland, Oregon, US

Coordinates: 45°31′19.47″N 122°38′46.03″W

- Company type: Worker cooperative
- Industry: Cycling
- Founded: 1986
- Defunct: 2024
- Headquarters: Portland, Oregon, United States
- Website: citybikes.coop

Citybikes Workers' Cooperative was a worker-run bike shop in Portland, Oregon, United States, focused on bike commuting and cycle touring. It encompassed two retail locations/shops: the Annex, specializing in new and used bike sales; and the Repair Shop, specializing in used bike parts. The Annex closed in 2016.

Citybikes closed in 2024.

== History ==
Citybikes was founded by Roger Noehren as a sole proprietorship in 1986, in the current Repair Shop building. He hired Tim Calvert in August 1989 to transform Citybikes into a worker owned cooperative (w/o RN), which came into being in January 1990. Business continued to grow, and in 1995, Citybikes expanded to the Annex building (instigated by RN, who returned in 1994). At this time, Citybikes began to sell a higher volume of used bikes, and also to carry new bikes. The Annex space was further remodeled/expanded in 2002, and the Repair Shop was remodeled, to double the retail space, in 2008. Citybikes grew from a fledgling enterprise to a successful cooperatively run business employing about 20 people in winter, and 25 in summer, before a period of downturn that ultimately ended with the closure of the shop in 2024.

== Cooperative structure ==
Citybikes operated with consensus-based decision making. The majority of decisions that affect the cooperative are made in bimonthly general meetings, with all workers present having equal say and voting power. Day-to-day operations were also carried out by consensus - Citybikes did not have any managers or traditional hierarchy. The board of directors was made up of the worker-owners, and was responsible for the long-term interests of the cooperative, setting goals and making final decisions on policies and procedures. Ownership was available to all workers who met certain time and responsibility commitments. About half of workers were worker-owners.

Gender balance played an important role since the shop's inception. Men and women each made up roughly half of the Board of Directors, and workforce as a whole.

== Apprenticeship program ==
Every other autumn, Citybikes conducted a program wherein people could apply for apprenticeship positions. Apprenticeship was a two-year program which trains people to be both skilled mechanics, and effective workers within the cooperative structure. In addition to training people for cooperative bike shop work specifically, apprenticeship was an avenue for underrepresented populations (e.g. women and minorities) to enter the bike industry.

== D.I.Y. ==
Citybikes held classes for the public to learn bike maintenance in the winter, and also hosts bi-weekly "drop-in nights" where the public could work on their own bikes with staff assistance. Repair stands and simple tools were available to borrow during shop hours, enabling customers to use the shop's resources to repair their own bikes at no cost. The Repair Shop location had a room devoted to used bike parts for shoppers to rummage through.
