= Pluralist commonwealth =

The term pluralist commonwealth refers to a systemic model of wealth democratization supported and facilitated by a variety of different institutional forms. Political economist and historian Gar Alperovitz is generally credited for the development of this model as a way to resolve socio-economic problems associated with corporate capitalism and traditional state socialism. Expanding upon proposals that focus more narrowly on state- versus worker-ownership or state- versus self-managed enterprises, this "pluralist" approach involves large-scale public ownership of corporate equity, worker-owned and community-benefitting enterprises, Community Development Corporations, nonprofit corporations and enterprising state and local public agencies. According to Waheed Hussain: "A pluralist commonwealth is a free-market society in which the economic returns on productive assets improve the lives of large communities of individuals, rather than a narrow elite."
