= Caja Laboral =

Spanish credit union

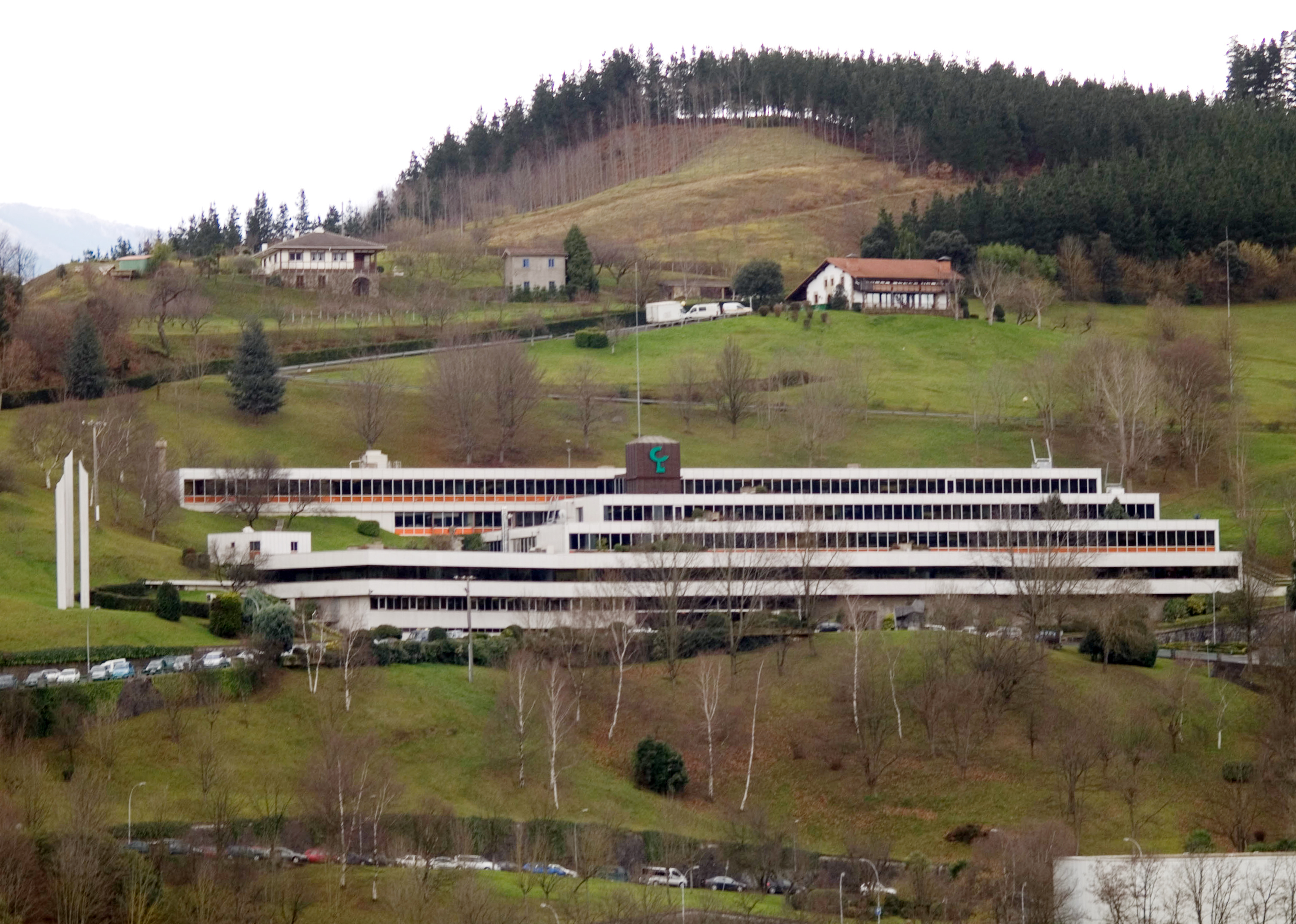
- Caja Laboral headquarters in Mondragón
- Type: Credit union
- Industry: Financial services
- Successor: Laboral Kutxa
- Headquarters: Mondragón, Spain
- Area served: Basque Country
- Key people: Txomin García (President)
- Parent: Mondragon Corporation
- Website: cajalaboral.es

Caja Laboral Popular Cooperativa de Crédito or Caja Laboral (In Basque: Euskadiko Kutxa, in English: Workers' Credit Union) was a Spanish credit union established in 1959 as part of the Mondragon Corporation and headquartered in Mondragón, in the Basque Country of Spain. The major financial provider behind the Basque cooperative movement, Caja Laboral covered the financial segment of Mondragon and provided banking and financial services to its customers through a network of over 370 branch offices in the Basque Country and beyond. With over 1800 employees (who were actually the partners-owners of the bank following the cooperative philosophy of shared ownership and stewardship), Caja Laboral generated annual revenue in excess of €330 million.

Together with its sister social assurance company Lagun Aro, Caja Laboral spearheaded the Financial Group of the Mondragon Corporation, which according to company sources 'operates autonomously within the framework of a sole joint strategy'. It was the first Spanish financial institution to open its branches in the late afternoons/early evenings.

Caja Laboral was mostly unaffected by the 2008 financial crisis, though they did have €162 million in bonds from Lehman Brothers. Effective with the 2009–10 basketball season, Caja Laboral became the new sponsors of Liga ACB and Euroleague club Saski Baskonia.

In 2012, Caja Laboral merged with Ipar Kutxa to form the credit union Laboral Kutxa.

== See also ==
- List of banks in the euro area
- List of banks in Spain
