= Mondragon Corporation =

Spanish cooperative federation

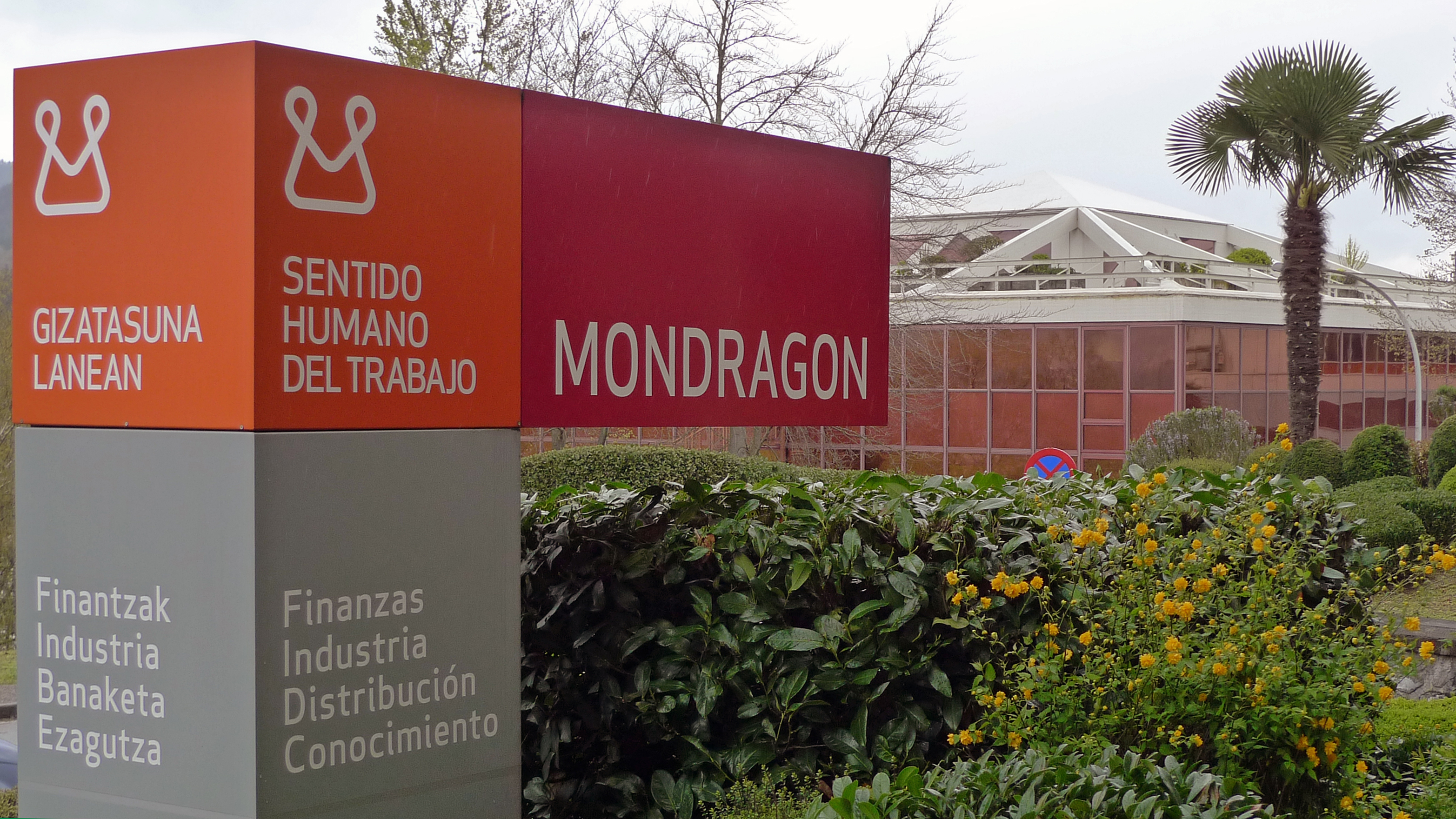
- Type: Worker cooperative federation
- Founded: 14 April 1956
- Founder: José María Arizmendiarrieta
- Headquarters: Mondragón, Basque Country, Spain
- Area served: International
- Key people: Pello Rodríguez (president of the General Council)
- Revenue: €11.322 billion (2025)
- Number of employees: 71,415 (2025)
- Divisions: Finance, Industry, Retail, Knowledge
- Website: mondragon-corporation.com

The Mondragon Corporation is a corporation and federation of worker cooperatives based in the Basque region of Spain.

It was founded in the town of Mondragón in 1956 by Father José María Arizmendiarrieta and a group of his students at a technical college he founded. Its first product was paraffin heaters.

It is the seventh-largest Spanish company in terms of asset turnover and the leading business group in the Basque Country. At the end of 2016, it employed 74,117 people in 257 companies and organizations in four areas of activity: finance, industry, retail and knowledge. By 2025, 71,415 people were employed. Its industrial cooperatives had an average workforce of 26,975, including 9,708 people working at production facilities outside Spain.

Mondragon cooperatives operate in accordance with the Statement on the Co-operative Identity maintained by the International Co-operative Alliance.

== History ==
In 1941, as a young Catholic priest, José María Arizmendiarrieta settled in Mondragón, a town with a population of 7,000 that had not yet recovered from the poverty, hunger, exile, and tension of the Spanish Civil War. In 1943, Arizmendiarrieta established a technical college which became a training ground for managers, engineers and skilled labour for local companies, and primarily for the co-operatives.

Arizmendiarrieta spent a number of years educating young people about a form of humanism based on solidarity and participation, in harmony with Catholic social teaching, and the importance of acquiring the necessary technical knowledge before creating the first co-operative.

In 1955, he selected five young people to establish the first company of the co-operative and industrial beginning of the Mondragon Corporation. The company was called Talleres Ulgor ("Ulgor workshops"), an acronym derived from the surnames of Usatorre, Larrañaga, Gorroñogoitia, Ormaechea, and Ortubay, known today as Fagor Electrodomésticos (Spanish for "Fagor electric appliances").

In the first 15 years, many co-operatives were established, thanks to the autarky of the market and the awakening of the Spanish economy. During these years, also with the encouragement of Arizmendiarrieta, the Caja Laboral ("Labor savings bank", 1959) and the Social Welfare Body Lagun Aro ("Friend/help time", 1966) were established that played a key role. The first local group was created, Ularco. In 1969, Eroski was founded by merging ten small local consumer co-operatives.

During the next 20 years, from 1970 to 1990, the dynamic continued, with a strong increase in new co-operatives promoted by Caja Laboral's Business Division, the promotion of co-operative associations, the formation of local groups, and the founding of the Ikerlan ("Research work") research centre in 1974.

With Spain scheduled to join the European Economic Community in 1986, it was decided in 1984 to establish the "Mondragon Co-operative Group", the forerunner of the current corporation. In-service training for managers was strengthened by creating Otalora, dedicated to training, and the dissemination of co-operatives. The Group consisted of 23,130 workers at the end of 1990.

Mondragon Corporation Headquarters, 2025

=== International expansion ===
On the international stage, the aim was to respond to growing globalisation, expanding abroad by establishing production plants in a number of countries. The first was the Copreci plant in Mexico in 1990, followed by many others: up to 73 by the end of 2008, and 122 at the end of 2013. The goals were to increase competitiveness and market share, bring component supply closer to customers' plants, especially in the automotive and domestic appliance sectors, and to strengthen employment in the Basque Country by promoting exports of co-operatives' products by means of new platforms.

Between 2002 and 2007, Fagor and Eroski issued bonds (aportaciones subordinadas). While they were commercialized as safe deposits, the courts classed them as riskier debt instruments. When the yields fell during the 2008 financial crisis, bond-holders sued against the cooperatives.

In 2008, the worker-owners of the cooperatives Ampo (metal casting) and Irizar (coaches) voted to leave the corporation.

In October 2009, the United Steelworkers announced an agreement with Mondragon to create worker cooperatives in the United States. On 26 March 2012, the USW, Mondragon, and the Ohio Employee Ownership Center (OEOC) announced their detailed union co-op model.

The industrial sector ended 2012 with a new record of €4 billion in international sales, beating sales figures from before the 2008 financial crisis. Mondragon opened 11 new production subsidiaries. International sales that year accounted for 69% of all sales, a 26% increase from 2009 to 2012, and with 14,000 employees abroad. Mondragon's share in the BRIC markets increased to 20% compared to the previous year. In 2013, international sales grew by 6.7% and accounted for 71.1% of total sales.

On 16 October 2013, domestic appliance company Fagor Electrodomésticos filed for bankruptcy under Spanish law to renegotiate after suffering heavy losses during the euro area crisis and the 2008–2014 Spanish real estate crisis, putting 5,600 employees at risk of losing their jobs. This was followed by bankruptcy filings by Fagor Electrodomésticos’ subsidiaries, including its French subsidiary FagorBrandt on 6 November 2013. In July 2014, Fagor Electrodomésticos was bought by Catalonian company Cata for €42.5 million. Cata pledged to create 705 direct jobs in the Basque Country and to continue the brand names Fagor, Edesa, Aspes, and Splendid.

In 2022, the worker-owners of ULMA Group (scaffolding) and Orona (elevators) voted to leave the corporation. Estimated impact of the leave is a workforce drop by 13% and a 15% cut of the group's sales. As successful cooperatives they were contributing 10% of their profit to a common fund supporting ailing cooperatives. They will not contribute to the solidarity fund but they will keep insuring their workers with Lagun Aro and collaborate with Mondragon Unibertsitatea and other cooperatives in the group.

== Business culture ==
Mondragon co-operatives are united by a humanist concept of business, a philosophy of participation and solidarity, and a shared business culture. The culture is rooted in a shared mission and a number of principles, corporate values and business policies.

Over the years, these links have been embodied in a series of operating rules approved on a majority basis by the Co-operative Congresses, which regulate the activity of the Governing Bodies of the corporation (Standing Committee, General Council), the Grassroots Co-operatives and the Divisions they belong to, from the organisational, institutional and economic points of view as well as in terms of assets.

Pello Rodríguez, Mondragon Corporation President since 2024

This framework of business culture has been structured based on a common culture derived from the 10 Basic Co-operative Principles, in which Mondragon is rooted: Open Admission, Democratic Organisation, the Sovereignty of Labour, Instrumental and Subordinate Nature of Capital, Participatory Management, Payment Solidarity, Inter-cooperation, Social Transformation, Universality and Education.

This philosophy is complemented by four corporate values: Co-operation, acting as owners and protagonists; Participation, which takes shape as a commitment to management; Social Responsibility, by means of the distribution of wealth based on solidarity; and Innovation, focusing on constant renewal in all areas.

This business culture translates into compliance with a number of Basic Objectives (Customer Focus, Development, Innovation, Profitability, People in Co-operation and Involvement in the Community) and General Policies approved by the Co-operative Congress, which are taken on board at all the corporation's organisational levels and incorporated into the four-year strategic plans and the annual business plans of the individual co-operatives, divisions, and the corporation as a whole.

=== Wage regulation ===
At Mondragon, there are agreed-upon wage ratios between executive work and field or factory work which earns a minimum wage. These ratios range from 3:1 to 9:1 in different cooperatives and average 5:1. That is, the general manager of an average Mondragon cooperative earns no more than 5 times as much as the theoretical minimum wage paid in their cooperative. For most workers, this ratio is smaller because there are few Mondragon worker-owners that earn minimum wages, because most jobs are somewhat specialized and are classified at higher wage levels. The wage ratio of a cooperative is decided periodically by its worker-owners through a democratic vote.

Compared to similar jobs at local industries, Mondragon managers' wages were 30% lower in 1991 (as some companies pay their best paid managers hundreds of times more than the lowest-paid employee of the company) and equivalent for middle management, technical and professional levels. Lower wage levels are on average 13% higher than similar jobs at local businesses. Spain's progressive tax rate further reduces any disparity in pay. These comparatively low wages can make it very difficult to recruit managers from investor-owned firms.

== Business sectors ==
Mondragon Corporation operates in four areas: finance, industry, retail, and knowledge, with the latter distinguishing Mondragon from other business groups. In 2025, the corporation posted a total revenue of over €11,2 billion (roughly US$12,5 billion), and employed 71,415 workers.

=== Finance ===
The finance area includes Laboral Kutxa's banking and insurance activities and the social welfare institution LagunAro EPSV. In 2025, Laboral Kutxa reported consolidated net profit of €305 million and managed resources of €33.913 billion. LagunAro EPSV ended 2025 with a fund of €7.818 billion, 30,135 active members, 16,334 pensioners and 76,450 healthcare beneficiaries.

=== Industry ===
Mondragon's industrial companies operate in several fields, including consumer goods, capital goods, industrial components, construction products and systems, and business services. The services segment encompasses a diverse range of activities and business groups, including:

- Abantail: Adaptive design optimization
- Alecop: Engineering training
- LKS Consultores: Legal services
- KREAN: Architects and engineers.
- MCCTelecom: Telecommunication engineering.
- Mondragon Lingua: Translation and language schools
- Mondragon Sistemas: Automation, Industrial Computing and Telecommunications.
- Ondoan: Turnkey projects in the energy and environmental sector. In the leisure and sports area, it manufactures Orbea bicycles, exercise equipment and items for camping, garden and beach.

In advanced manufacturing, Danobatgroup reported turnover of €366 million in 2025. Its industrial businesses, Danobat and Soraluce, generated more than 90% of their sales from projects in international markets, with the United States as their principal market. The MIA group (MONDRAGON Industriarako Automatizazioa), comprising Fagor Arrasate, Fagor Automation and Mondragon Assembly, reported aggregate sales of €382 million. Specifically focusing on the automotive sector, the corporation also manufactures a wide variety of dies, molds and tooling for casting iron and aluminium, and occupies a leading position in machinery for the casting sector.

In Industrial Components, Mondragon posted a turnover of €1.5 billion in 2009, a sector in which it operates as an integrated supplier for the leading car manufacturers, offering from the design and development of a part to the industrialization and supply of components and assemblies. It has different business units such as brakes, axles, suspension, transmission, engines, aluminium wheel rims, fluid conduction, and other internal and external vehicle components. Mondragon Componentes comprises seven cooperatives: Copreci, Eika, Embega, Erreka, Fagor Electrónica, Orkli and Tajo. In 2025, the division reported sales of €730 million, operated more than 20 production plants worldwide and employed 4,700 people, including 2,165 in the Basque Country and Navarre.

In 2025 Mondragon Construcción reported aggregate turnover of €651 million, an increase of 8% compared with 2024, and aggregate profit before tax of €63 million. Businesses covered by the division's annual review included Onnera Group, Lana, Etorki, Domusa and Kide. Developments during the year included a new laundry equipment plant operated by Onnera Group in Oñati and the development of automatic doors by Kide in cooperation with Erreka.

In 2025, the MISE division (Mondragon Ingeniería y Servicios) reported growth of more than 10% in both revenue and earnings. Its activities included services, infrastructure and technologies for older people, alongside sustainability projects. It also worked with Universidad Mondragón México, based in Querétaro, to attract talent to the Basque Country and Mondragon's cooperatives.

In services to business, sales totaled €248 million in 2008, including business consultancy services, architecture and engineering, property consulting, design and innovation (LKS Group), systems engineering for electromechanical installations, and integrated logistics engineering. It also offers a modern language service, manufactures educational equipment, and provides graphic arts services (mccgraphics S.Coop).

In 2025, international sales accounted for 73% of the Industry area's total sales, amounting to €3.603 billion. Domestic sales amounted to €1.316 billion, bringing total industrial sales to €4.919 billion. In 2025, the Industry area had an average workforce of 26,975, including 9,708 people working at production facilities outside Spain.

=== Retail ===
Mondragon runs Eroski, one of the leading retail groups throughout Spain and southern France, and maintains close contacts with the French group Les Mousquetaires and the German retailer Edeka, with whom it set up the Alidis international purchasing group in 2002. The worker-owners and consumer-members participate in the co-operative's decision-making bodies and management of Eroski.

In 2008, worker-members voted to expand the cooperative transformation to the retail group as a whole, turning subsidiaries into co-operatives, and making salaried workers worker-members.

In 2025, the Eroski Group reported sales of €6.081 billion, an increase of 3.3% compared with 2024, and earnings of €47 million. Its network comprised more than 1,500 physical and online stores. The group employed more than 28,200 people, including 8,336 worker-members.

The retail area also includes Erkop, a second-tier cooperative in the agri-food sector comprising Ausolan, Miba, Barrenetxe and Behi Alde, together with their investee companies.

=== Knowledge ===
This area has a dual focus: education-training and innovation, which have both been key elements in the development of the corporation. Training-education is mainly linked to the dynamism of Mondragon University, the significant role that Politeknika Ikastegia Txorierri, Arizmendi Ikastola and Lea Artibai Ikastetxea play in their respective areas and the activity of the Management and Co-operative Development Centre Otalora.

Mondragon University is a co-operative university, which combines the development of knowledge, skills, and values, and maintains close relations with business, especially Mondragon co-operatives. Technological innovation is supported by the cooperatives' R&D departments, the Corporate Science and Technology Plan and a research network comprising five technology centres and seven corporate R&D units in 2025.

Mondragon's R&D indicators for 2025 recorded 2,133 full-time researchers and 386 active patent families at year end. The annual report's R&D indicator table listed investment of €205 million, equivalent to 12.6% of added value. During the year, 212 projects were submitted to European Commission funding programmes, of which 37 received funding.

== Reactions ==
In 2012, Richard D. Wolff, an American professor of economics, hailed the Mondragon set of enterprises, including the good wages it provides for employees, the empowerment of ordinary workers in decision making, and the measure of equality for female workers, as a major success and cited it as a working model of an alternative to the capitalist mode of production.

In an April 2012 interview, Noam Chomsky said that, while Mondragon offers an alternative to capitalism, it was still embedded in a capitalist system which limits Mondragon's decisions:

Take the most advanced case: Mondragon. It's worker-owned, it's not worker managed, although the management does come from the workforce often, but it's in a market system and they still exploit workers in South America, and they do things that are harmful to the society as a whole and they have no choice. If you're in a system where you must make a profit in order to survive, you're compelled to ignore negative externalities, effects on others.

Vicenç Navarro wrote that, from a business perspective, Mondragon is successful in matching efficiency with solidarity and democracy. However, he writes that the number of employees who are not owners has increased more rapidly than worker-owners, to a point that in some companies, such as the supermarket chains owned by Mondragon, the first is a much larger group than the second. In Navarro's view, this establishes a two-tier system – for example, in terms of whom to save in the case the company collapses. In the collapse of Fagor, the relocation of employees to other companies belonging to Mondragon favored those who were worker-owners, which may affect labor relations:

Actually, one of the successes of Mondragon was its ability to create a sense of identity among the workers within the company, encouraging an environment of solidarity and collegiality among them, a feeling that also extended (although to a much lesser degree) to non-worker-owners. The connection felt by the latter group has somewhat weakened, however, exposing a vulnerable point for the cooperative.

The Mondragon system is one of four case studies analyzed in Capital and the Debt Trap, which summarized evidence claiming that cooperatives tend to last longer and are less susceptible to perverse incentives and other problems of organizational governance than more traditionally managed organizations.

The founders of Cooperation Jackson, a network of worker cooperatives in Jackson, Mississippi in the United States, cite Mondragon as a key inspiration.

Kim Stanley Robinson's science fiction novels depict a future where the Mondragon Corporation is prominent. The Mondragon Corporation appeared in Robinson's works Mars trilogy, The Ministry for the Future, in the novel 2312 which features a world where the Mondragon Corporation has evolved into a planned economy system called the Mondragon Accord..

== See also ==
- Cecosesola, association of cooperatives in Venezuela
- Distributism
- Horizontalidad
- John Lewis Partnership
- List of worker cooperatives
- Workers' self-management
