= Fagor =

Spanish appliance manufacturer

Fagor Electrodoméstico, S. Coop
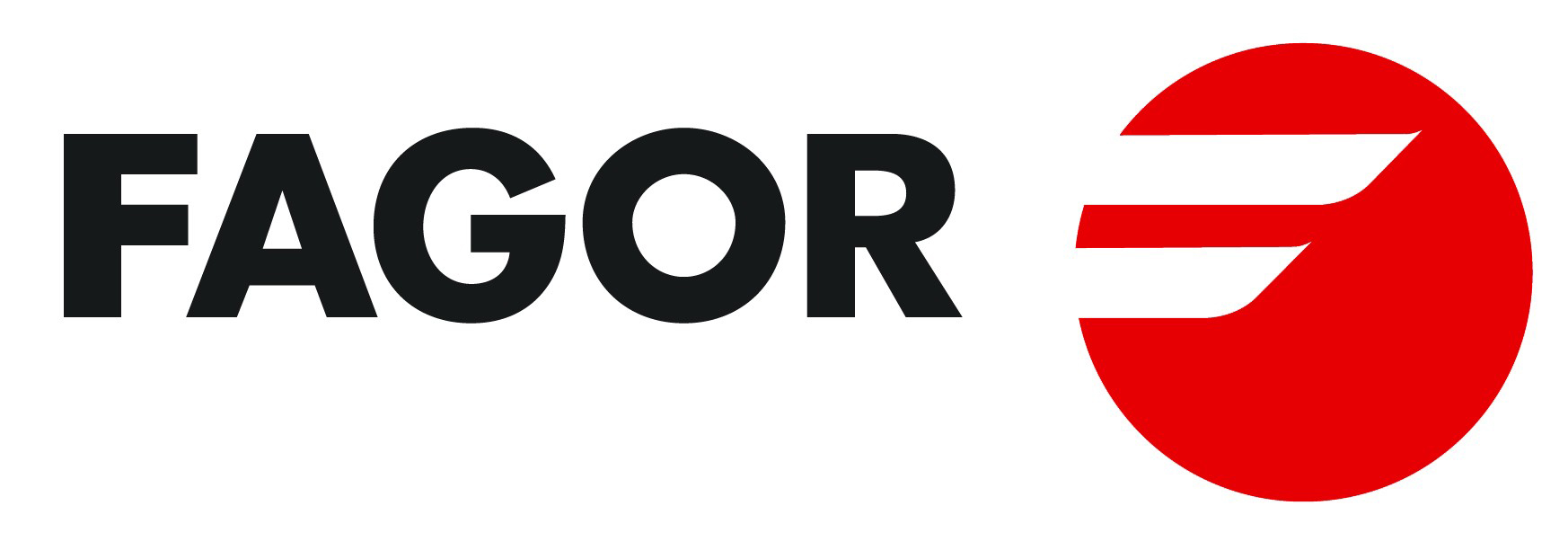
- Type: Sociedad Cooperativa
- Founded: 1956
- Defunct: November 2013
- Fate: Bankruptcy; acquired by CNA Group
- Headquarters: Mondragón, Spain
- Number of employees: 6,000 (2006)
- Parent: Mondragon Corporation (1956–2014); CNA Group (2014–present); Amica Group (2019–present, white goods only)
- Website: www.fagor.com

Fagor Electrodoméstico was a large domestic and commercial appliance manufacturer based in the Basque Country, Spain and run by the Mondragon Corporation. Fagor was Spain's largest consumer appliance company and the fifth largest electrical appliance company in Europe, manufacturing a wide range of domestic appliances, including washing machines, refrigerators and ovens.

== History ==
Fagor Electrodoméstico was the world's biggest industrial worker cooperative for decades, the flagship of the Mondragon Corporation, the world's largest workers' co-operative.

It started in 1956 in a small workshop in Mondragón, Spain. From the Spanish market, it expanded internationally to North Africa and Latin America in the late 1980s. From 1996 to 2001, Fagor formed joint ventures with international companies. In 1999, Fagor acquired Wrozamet in Poland. The acquisition of Brandt Electroménager in 2005 made it the leader in household appliances in France. Among European manufacturers, it ranked fifth after Electrolux, Whirlpool, Bosch Siemens and Merloni. The employees of the foreign acquisitions were not offered ownership. Besides, about 15% of the workers in the parent company were temporary employees without ownership rights. In 2006, it had eight production plants in Spain, four in France, one in Poland, one in Italy, three in China and one in Morocco). Its 1,729-million-euro sales were 6% of the European market. The total workforce was 10,543 employees. The buying of Brandt and other growth was financed through borrowing as capital markets were not available. When the Spanish housing crisis struck in 2008, the main market for Fagor appliances collapsed. Increased Asian competition could not be countered in spite of austerity measures, liquidity injections and staff relocation.

On October 16, 2013, Fagor Electrodoméstico filed for protection from creditors while it tried to refinance and renegotiate its €1.1 billion of debt under Spanish law, after suffering heavy losses during the European financial crisis.

On November 6, 2013, Fagor Brandt, the French subsidiary of the Spanish appliance manufacturing group, which employed 1,920 people, announced its bankruptcy and was placed under receivership in early 2014, before being divested and taken over by the Algerian conglomerate Cevital Group.

Later Fagor Electrodoméstico officially announced its bankruptcy as well and has been taken over by Spanish appliance manufacturer CATA Electrodoméstico (CNA Group) in autumn 2014, adding 155 new jobs.

In late 2014, the German appliance company BSH Hausgeräte was about to purchase FagorMastercook in Poland.

One of the factors in the fall of Fagor has been the human resources policy. Relatives of workers were given preference. The new workers did not acquire the cooperative mindset and were submitted to Taylorist methods. The disengagement led to absenteeism beyond the usual in Spanish private companies, and unusually higher among the younger workers. This was paradoxical for a worker-owned company. A reverse dominance hierarchy formed and decisions like offshoring production to the cheaper wage workers were not taken by worker-owners.

== Structure and global business ==
Mondragon Corporation comprises, 122 industrial companies, 6 financial organizations, 14 retailers, 4 research centers, 1 university, 14 insurance companies, and international trade services. It has a assets of 24.72b Euro (2014), a revenue of 12.1b Euro (2015), and a workforce of 69,000.

The corporation is divided into three main divisions: finance, retail, and industrial.

Major international expansion has increased Fagor's workforce to 6,074. It has factories in Europe, America, and Africa. It also has 13 worldwide subsidiaries and sales networks in 80 countries in 5 continents. The purchase of the Brandt Group in 2005 made Fagor one of the largest appliance manufacturers in Europe. This also included the brand names, Ocean, SanGiorgio, and De Dietrich.

Fagor America makes major appliances, small appliances, and cookware.

44% of Fagor's sales are international, 70% percent of which are in France, Portugal, Germany, the UK, Morocco, Poland, and the Czech Republic.

Fagor markets its products under the following brand names:

- Fagor
- Edesa
- Aspes
- Mastercook
- De Dietrich
- Fagor Commercial
- Brandt
- Ocean (acquired with Brandt acquisition)
- SanGiorgio (acquired with Brandt acquisition)
- De Dietrich (acquired with Brandt acquisition)

== Bankruptcy and sale ==
With debts of around 800 million euros, the company had to file for preliminary bankruptcy (preconcurso under Spanish law) on October 17, 2013; at the beginning of November, the subsidiaries in Poland (Fagor Mastercook) and in France (Fagor Brandt) and on November 13, the parent company also filed for bankruptcy in Spain.

A large part of the French activities, by far the largest part of the former Fagor Group with approx. 1200 employees and the Brandt brand, was taken over by Cevital, an Algerian conglomerate, in April 2014. The locations in Spain with around 700 employees were taken over by the Spanish household goods manufacturer CNA Group in July 2014. The site of the former Polish subsidiary Fagor Mastercook in Wrocław was taken over in December 2014 by the German household goods manufacturer BSH, which announced that it would employ up to 500 people there.
