= Derek C. Jones =

American economist

Derek C. Jones (born c. 1946) is the Irma M. and Robert D. Morris Professor of Economics at Hamilton College. He is recognized for his contributions to the economics of participation, particularly his pioneering work on the econometric analysis of worker cooperatives, employee ownership, and profit-sharing firms.

== Early life and education ==
Jones grew up in Middlesbrough, UK, attending Acklam Hall Grammar School. After a year at the Constantine College of Technology he went on to read Economics at the University of Newcastle upon Tyne and gained a BA first class honors (1968). The following year he was awarded an MSc. with distinction at the London School of Economics. Jones earned his Ph.D. in Economics from Cornell University in 1974, specializing in labor economics, comparative economic systems, macroeconomics, and development.

== Career ==
Jones joined Hamilton College in 1972. He served as chair of the Economics Department on multiple occasions. He has held numerous visiting positions, including at Pembroke College, Oxford, the Helsinki School of Economics (now Aalto University), Hitotsubashi University, and the London Business School. Jones has also been a visiting scholar or Fellow at institutions including Cambridge University, Copenhagen Business School, Manchester University, Warwick University, Durham University, Cornell and Mondragon University.

== Research contributions ==
Jones's major research fields are employee participation, employee ownership, human resource management practices, and cooperative enterprises. The centre of attention is the analysis of the effects of employee ownership and participation on firm outcomes such as productivity and investment as well as worker outcomes such as job satisfaction. He has also studied diverse issues in transition (post-socialist) economies, publishing extensively on themes including the effects of diverse forms of ownership on enterprise performance for countries including Bulgaria, Latvia, Estonia, Lithuania, Russia, and China.

He has published in academic, policy and practitioner-oriented journals in advanced and emerging market economies, including the American Economic Review, Journal of Economic Literature, Economica, Economic Journal, Journal of Comparative Economics, Industrial and Labor Relations Review, Industrial Relations, Oxford Economic Papers, and many others. He has authored or co-authored over 145 articles in refereed journals and book chapters, as well as eight books, including editing the first five volumes of the series Advances in the Economic Analysis of Participatory and Labor Managed Firms.

He has collaborated with many distinguished economists including Saul Estrin, Jan Svejnar, Avner Ben-Ner, Louis Putterman, John Bonin, Dave Backus, Geoff Hodgson, Kosali Ilayperuma-Simon, Takao Kato, Stephen Smith, Will Bartlett, and Jacques Defourny. He has also collaborated with non-economists and published in non-economics journals such as the American Sociological Review.

== Honors and professional activities ==
Jones has received numerous honors, including Hamilton College's inaugural Career Achievement Award in 2008. He has served as President of the Association for Comparative Economic Studies and the International Association for the Economics of Participation. His fellowships include those from Ikerbasque, the Finnish Foundation for Education, the German Marshall Fund, and the Social Science Research Council (UK).

Jones is formerly a research fellow at the Davidson Institute (University of Michigan) and SKOPE (University of Oxford) and is currently a Faculty Fellow and Mentor, School of Management and Labor Relations at Rutgers University. He has served on editorial boards for several academic journals including the J. of Comparative Economics and acted as a consultant for organizations such as the International Labour Organization (ILO) and the World Bank.

== Selected publications ==
=== Articles ===
- Jones, Derek C.; Kato, Takao (1995). "The Productivity Effects of Employee Stock-Ownership Plans and Bonuses: Evidence from Japanese Panel Data". The American Economic Review. 85 (3): 391–414. ISSN 0002-8282.
- Bonin, John P.; Jones, Derek C.; Putterman, Louis (1993). "Theoretical and Empirical Studies of Producer Cooperatives: Will Ever the Twain Meet?". Journal of Economic Literature. 31 (3): 1290–1320. ISSN 0022-0515.
- Ben-Ner, Avner; Jones, Derek C. (1995). "Employee Participation, Ownership, and Productivity: A Theoretical Framework". Industrial Relations: A Journal of Economy and Society. 34 (4): 532–554. doi:10.1111/j.1468-232X.1995.tb00387.x. ISSN 1468-232X.
- Jones, Derek C.; Kalmi, Panu; Kauhanen, Antti (1 January 2012). "The effects of general and firm-specific training on wages and performance: evidence from banking". Oxford Economic Papers. 64 (1): 151–175. doi:10.1093/oep/gpr013. ISSN 0030-7653.

=== Books ===
- Participatory and self-managed firms: evaluating economic performance (2. pr ed.). Lexington, Mass: Lexington Books. 1983.
- The Bulgarian economy: lessons from reform during early transition (Repr ed.). Aldershot: Ashgate. 1998.
- New economy handbook. Amsterdam Heidelberg: Elsevier. 2003.
