= Worker cooperative =

Cooperative that is owned and self-managed by its workers

A worker cooperative or a labour-managed firm is a cooperative owned and self-managed by its workers. The meaning of this control varies by definition; it may mean a firm where every worker-owner participates in decision-making in a democratic manner, or it may refer to one in which management is elected by every worker-owner, each of whom has one vote.

Worker cooperatives appeared as part of the labour movement in reaction to capitalism and the Industrial Revolution. Such organisations began in the 18th century and developed further throughout the 19th century with groups such as the Rochdale Society of Equitable Pioneers, which established the Rochdale Principles to guide cooperative management.

Compared with traditional investor-owned firms, worker cooperatives tend to have greater longevity, higher levels of trust, and higher job satisfaction. Productivity varies by location and sector, showing mixed outcomes. They tend to have more volatility in wages, but less wage inequality, and employment tends to be more stable.

== Definition ==
Although there is no universally accepted definition of a workers' cooperative, they can be considered businesses that make a product or offer a service to sell for profit in which the workers are members or worker-owners. Worker-owners work in the business, govern it, and manage it. Unlike conventional firms, the ownership and decision-making power of a worker cooperative should be vested solely with the worker-owners, and ultimate authority rests with the worker-owners as a whole. Worker-owners control the resources of the cooperative and the work process, such as wages or hours of work.

CICOPA, the International Organisation of Industrial, Artisanal and Service Producers' Cooperatives, gives an eight-page definition in its World Declaration on Workers' Cooperatives, which was approved by the International Co-operative Alliance General Assembly in September 2005. Below is the section on the basic characteristics of workers' cooperatives:

1. They have the objective of creating and maintaining sustainable jobs and generating wealth, to improve the quality of life of the worker-members, dignify human work, allow workers' democratic self-management and promote community and local development.
2. The free and voluntary membership of their members, in order to contribute with their personal work and economic resources, is conditioned by the existence of workplaces.
3. As a general rule, work shall be carried out by the members. This implies that the majority of the workers in a given worker cooperative enterprise are members and vice versa.
4. The worker-members' relation with their cooperative shall be considered as different from that of conventional wage-based labour and that of autonomous individual work.
5. Their internal regulation is formally defined by regimes that are democratically agreed upon and accepted by the worker-members.
6. They shall be autonomous and independent, before the State and third parties, in their labour relations and management and in the usage and management of the means of production.

As mentioned above, most, if not all, of the workers in a given worker cooperative enterprise are worker-owners, although some casual or wage workers may be employed with whom profits and decision-making are not necessarily shared equally. Workers also often undergo a trial or screening period (such as three or six months) before being allowed to have full voting rights.

Participation is based on one vote per worker-owner, regardless of the number of shares or equity owned by each worker-owner. Voting rights are not tied to investment or patronage in the workers' cooperative, and only worker-owners can vote on decisions that affect them. In practice, worker cooperatives have to accommodate a range of interests to survive and have experimented with different voice and voting arrangements to accommodate the interests of trade unions, local authorities, and those who have invested proportionately more labour, or through attempts to mix individual and collective forms of worker-ownership and control.

In short, workers' cooperatives are organised to serve the needs of worker-owners by generating benefits (which may or may not be profits) for the worker-owners rather than external investors. This worker-driven orientation makes them fundamentally different from other corporations. Additional cooperative structural characteristics and guiding principles further distinguish them from other business models. For example, worker-owners may not believe that profit maximisation is the best or only goal for their cooperative, or they may follow the Rochdale Principles. As another example, worker cooperatives' flattened management structure and more egalitarian ideology often give workers more options and greater freedom in resolving workplace problems.

Profits (or losses) earned by the workers' cooperative are shared by worker-owners. Salaries generally have a low ratio difference, which ideally should be "guided by principles of proportionality, external solidarity and internal solidarity".

Theorists and practitioners believe the importance of capital should be subordinated to labour in workers' cooperatives. As such, Adams et al. see workers' cooperatives as "labour-ist" rather than "capital-ist":

Labour is the hiring factor; therefore, the voting and property rights are assigned to the people who do the work and not to capital, even though the worker-members supply capital through membership fees and retained earnings... Any profit or loss after normal operating expenses is assigned to members on the basis of their labour contribution.

Nevertheless, recent developments in the cooperative movement have started to shift thinking toward multi-stakeholder perspectives. This has resulted in repeated attempts to develop model rules that differentiate control rights from investment and profit-sharing rights.

=== Internal structure ===
If exercised directly, all members meet regularly to make and vote on decisions on how the cooperative is run. Direct workers' cooperatives sometimes use consensus decision-making to make decisions. Direct worker control ensures a formally flat management structure instead of a hierarchical one. This structure is influenced by activist collectives and civic organizations, with all members allowed and expected to play a managerial role. Such structures may be associated with political aims such as anarchism, libertarian socialism, distributism, and participatory economics.

Among anarchist traditions, views of worker cooperatives differ largely over market dynamics and property rights. Left-leaning anarchists and libertarian socialists have historically viewed worker cooperatives as an alternative to capitalist hierarchies, arguing that democratic worker self-management is necessary for economic liberation. By contrast, right-libertarian and Austrian economic scholarship views worker cooperatives primarily in terms of private property rights and voluntary contract. Philosophers like Robert Nozick emphasize that individuals are free to form democratically run cooperative firms, but those firms must compete voluntarily in the market. In a laissez-faire framework, such firms are legitimate and must attract enough consumer support to succeed. If they cannot sustain themselves without outside intervention, they may fail.

Some workers' cooperatives also practice job rotation or balanced job complexes to reduce inequalities of power and give workers broader exposure to the different jobs in the workplace, enabling them to participate more effectively in decision-making. This has proved sustainable with workforces as large as 300 workers, at Suma Wholefoods.

The term "worker collective" is sometimes used to describe worker cooperatives which are also collectives: that is, managed without hierarchies such as permanent manager roles.

==== Common ownership ====
The principle of common ownership was codified in UK Law in the Industrial Common Ownership Act 1976 which defines a "common ownership enterprise" as:

a body as to which the registrar has given, and has not revoked, a certificate stating that he is satisfied—

(a) that the body is—

(i) a company which has no share capital, is limited by guarantee and is a bona fide co-operative society; or

(ii) a registered society within the meaning of the Co-operative and Community Benefit Societies Act 2014; and

(b) that the articles of association or rules of the body include provisions which secure—

(i) that only persons who are employed by, or by a subsidiary of, the body may be members of it, that (subject to any provision about qualifications for membership which is from time to time made by the members of the body by reference to age, length of service or other factors of any description which do not discriminate between persons by reference to politics or religion) all such persons may be members of the body and that members have equal voting rights at meetings of the body,

(ii) that the assets of the body are applied only for the purposes of objects of the body which do not include the making over of assets to any member of the body except for value and except in pursuance of arrangements for sharing the profits of the body among its members, and

(iii) that, if on the winding up or dissolution of the body any of its assets remain to be disposed of after its liabilities are satisfied, the assets are not distributed among its members but are transferred to such a common ownership enterprise or such a central fund maintained for the benefit of common ownership enterprises as may be determined by the members at or before the time of the winding-up or dissolution or, in so far as the assets are not so transferred, are held for charitable purposes; and

(c) that the body is controlled by a majority of the people working for the body and of the people working for the subsidiaries, if any, of the body.

The principle is typically implemented by inserting two clauses in a company's memorandum of association or an industrial and provident society's rules:

- The first provides that the company's assets shall be applied solely in furtherance of its objectives and may not be divided among the members or trustees.
- The second provides for "altruistic dissolution", an "asset lock", whereby, if the enterprise is wound up, remaining assets exceeding liabilities shall not be divided among the members but shall be transferred to another enterprise with similar aims or to charity.

A significant early influence on the movement has been the Scott Bader Commonwealth, a composites and specialty polymer plastics manufacturing company in Wellingborough, Northamptonshire, whose owner Ernest Bader gave the company to the workforce in installments through the late 1950s to early 1960s. Contrary to the popular concept of common ownership organizations as being small in size, Scott Bader Commonwealth is a high-technology chemical manufacturer whose turnover has exceeded £100 million per annum since the early 1990s with a workforce of hundreds. In London, Calverts is an example of an established worker cooperative with a policy of pay parity. One of the most successful ventures of the collective movement is Suma Wholefoods in Elland, West Yorkshire.

==== Labor-managed firms ====
Economists have modeled the worker cooperative as a firm in which labor hires capital, rather than capital hiring labor, as in a conventional firm. The classic theoretical contributions to such a "labor-managed firm" (LMF) model are due to Benjamin Ward and Jaroslav Vanek. In the neoclassical version, the objective of the LMF is to maximize not total profit, but rather income per worker. While such a scenario implies "perverse" behavior, such as laying off workers when output prices rise so as to divide increased profits among fewer members, evidence supporting such behavior is lacking. A review of the empirical economics literature can be found in Bonin, Jones, and Putterman. Alternative behavioral models have also been proposed. Peter Law examined LMFs that value employment and income. Nobel Laureate Amartya Sen examined pay according to work and according to need. Nobel Laureate James Meade examined the behavior of an "inegalitarian" LMF.

==== Leagues ====
Economists have explained the clustering of worker coops through leagues or "supporting structures". Large clusters of worker cooperatives supported by leagues are found in Mondragón, Spain (especially the Mondragon Corporation), and in Italy, particularly Emilia-Romagna. Leagues provide various kinds of scale economies to make coops viable, and they reduce marginal costs which are already low for coops. However, the cost of forming a league is higher for a coop compared to a traditional firm, and their organizational structure creates different incentives from a firm, making coops less likely to form leagues. The lack of existing coop leagues then disincentivizes others from starting new coops, resulting in coops and their leagues being relatively rare.

=== Financing ===
==== Internal Capital Accounts/Member Buy-Ins ====
Internal Capital Accounts (ICAs), also known as Member Buy-Ins, are shares of capital distributed equally and exclusively to workers. They act as a mandated buy-in loan to the cooperative that generates a financial return over time in the form of interest. ICAs are typically equal to a specific term's wages, such as an annual salary, and are given a fixed rate of return that is not directly tied to the cooperative's losses or profits.

Cooperatives in low-income communities often raise donations to assist workers in meeting the ICA Buy-In requirement, as in the case of the Mariposa Food Coop. This method of financing is one of the most prominent due to its high rate of success in maintaining financial stability for cooperatives. When the cooperative allocates profits, a significant portion is paid back to the workers through these capital accounts. The Mondragon Corporation utilizes a 10–20–70 system, in which 10% of profits are placed into community development and infrastructure programs, 20% are placed back into corporate reserves, and 70% are placed into individual capital accounts.

In certain cases, such as the Mumbai Tiffin Box Supplier's Association in India, Member Buy-Ins allow cooperatives to become financially independent from other sources of investment.

==== Committed capital/preferred stock ====
Committed capital, also known as preferred stock, is capital offered in shares to external accredited investors who are not a part of the cooperative. In order to maintain workers' ownership over the firm's decisions, these external investors have limited or no voting rights within the cooperative. Committed capital often has non-guaranteed rates of return. However, Equal Exchange, a US-based worker cooperative, offers preferred stock that still ensures at least a 5% return even during periods of economic recession.

Because the communal ownership model of cooperatives makes it difficult for investors to determine the creditworthiness and reliability of their investments, they often rely on close analysis of the structure, management, and experience of each cooperative in order to decide in which one to acquire stock.

==== State financing ====
In many countries, the state provides loans or direct funding for worker cooperatives' production, community programs, and investments. Government funding is especially important in assisting newly developing cooperatives in securing financing for the initial stages of business.

In Spain, the Basque government assists in financing cooperatives within the Mondragon Corporation and many of Mondragon's education and healthcare programs. Additionally, they financially assist Mondragon in acquiring declining capitalist businesses and transitioning them into worker cooperatives.

The Indian government provides financing to new cooperatives, often in the form of loans. The government of Kerala and the Khadi Development and Village Industries Commission in India often provide initial loans to cooperatives to help them eventually transition to relying primarily on internal capital accounts.

In 1978, the government of the United Kingdom set up the National Cooperative Development Agency; in subsequent years, common ownership was promoted as a model for creating employment, leading approximately 100 local authorities to establish cooperative development agencies. The Industrial Common Ownership Act authorized the Secretary of State for Industry to make grants and loans to organizations that assisted common ownership and cooperative enterprises. Grants were made to the Industrial Common Ownership Movement and the Scottish Co-operatives Development Committee, while loans were administered through Common Ownership Finance Ltd.

The Italian government, through the Legge Marcora (Marcora Law), enacted in 1985 and reformed in 2001, established a financing mechanism of patient capital for creating worker cooperatives and social cooperatives and for worker buyouts of firms that are in trouble or have retiring owners. The mechanism particularly assists traditional businesses that require additional financial support when transitioning or converting into cooperatives. Originally, this state investment was equivalent to three times the workers' collective internal capital account investment. As of 2001, the state investment equals workers' capital contributions.

Canadian worker cooperatives also rely on government funding to finance their early development, usually in the form of grants. State sources of finance include the Quebec Local Development Centre, the Co-op Development Initiative, and the Young Entrepreneurs Program.

==== Traditional business transitions ====
When the owner of a traditional business decides to resign and transition ownership of the firm to a workers' cooperative, they often provide an initial financial investment. However, this is typically not sustainable; cooperatives often use the initial investment to begin business operations and then transition to other forms of financing. Examples of this method include Select Machines, Inc., Metis Construction, A Slice of New York, and Rock City Roasters.

The transition process occurs in 5 stages, often over several years.

1. The selling owners must evaluate whether a transition is appropriate for the business and consult with advisors and employees regarding changes in leadership.
2. The selling owner must employ specialists to determine the legal and financial requirements of the transition.
3. A transition group or the selling owner must organize the new managerial structure, business practices, and ownership policies.
4. Legal contracts are signed to establish the new management, while financing is obtained to launch the new cooperative.
5. An adjustment period occurs during which workers receive training on the new business policies.

==== External finance firm investment ====
Most financial institutions that specialize in providing capital to worker cooperatives are cooperative funds and Community Development Financial Institutions (CDFIs). CDFIs often do not supply the majority of financing for cooperatives, but act as collateral for other forms of investment or as support for another form of finance. Additionally, many cooperatives utilize external financing to improve their physical capital and productivity. Several U.S. CDFIs include the Cooperative Fund of New England, the Common Wealth Revolving Loan Fund, the Shared Capital Cooperative of Minneapolis, and Capital Impact Partners.

In France, worker cooperatives contribute funds to the SOCODEN (Société coopérative de développement et d'entraide), a cooperative financial institution that finances developing and struggling cooperatives. Additionally, this fund provides collateral for other sources of funding and subsidies for interest on loans to these cooperatives.

==== Direct public offerings ====
Direct public offerings (DPOs) are loans or donations generated either collectively by communities or individually by accredited and non-accredited investors. The voting rights that this investment produces for the community or investor vary depending on the cooperative and offering type. This form of financing is especially popular with cooperatives that provide services to local communities. By advertising investment opportunities to local communities, the firm generates financial capital and keeps the community engaged with the firm's products and success. For cooperatives undergoing an ownership transition, DPOs are often a source of financial support for the retiring owner's initial loan. Examples of firms that have utilized direct public offerings for financial support include Real Pickles and the CERO Cooperative.

==== Peer financing ====
Many worker cooperatives utilize surplus profits to provide loans or establish funds to support other developing or struggling cooperatives. These funds are also used as collateral for other forms of financing by cooperatives in need. Examples of peer financing in the U.S. include the Evergreen Cooperatives, the Share Capital Cooperative, and the Valley Alliance of Worker Cooperatives.

In Italy, large cooperative federations utilize excess profits to develop peer financing funds, which are also used for worker training programs and research into cooperatives.

France's worker cooperatives, also known as sociétés coopératives et participatives (SCOPs), are required to allocate a small portion of their profits to a financial fund for other French worker cooperatives in cooperative federations.

== History ==
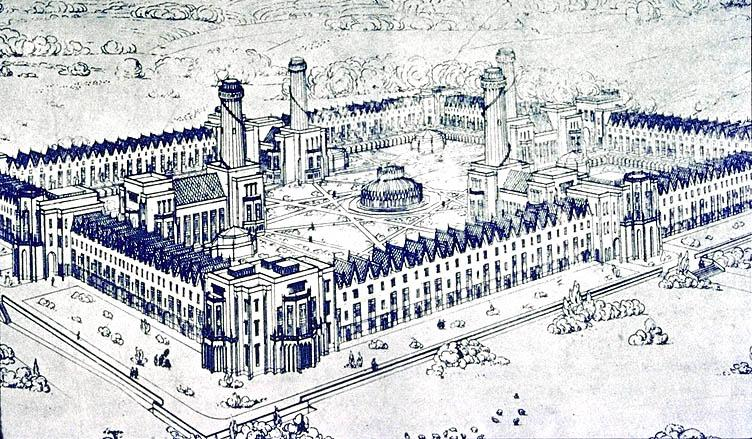
Model of Robert Owen's visionary project for a cooperative settlement. Owenites fired bricks to build it, but construction never took place.

Worker cooperatives rose to prominence during the Industrial Revolution as part of the labour movement. As employment moved to industrial areas and job sectors declined, workers began organizing and controlling businesses for themselves. According to Adams, worker cooperatives were originally sparked by "critical reaction to industrial capitalism and the excesses of the industrial revolution", with the first worker-owned and managed firm appearing in England in 1760. Some worker cooperatives were designed to "cope with the evils of unbridled capitalism and the insecurities of wage labor".

The philosophy of the cooperative movement stemmed from the socialist writings of thinkers including Robert Owen and Charles Fourier. Robert Owen, considered to be the father of the cooperative movement, made his fortune in the cotton trade but believed in providing his workers in a good environment and access to education for themselves and their children. These ideas were successfully put into effect in the cotton mills of New Lanark, Scotland. It was here that the first cooperative store was opened. Spurred on by the success, he had the idea of forming "villages of co-operation" where workers would escape poverty by growing their own food, making their own clothes, and ultimately becoming self-governing. He tried to form such communities in Orbiston in Scotland and New Harmony, Indiana in the United States, but both communities failed.

Similar experiments were conducted in the early 19th century, and by 1830 there were several hundred cooperatives. Dr William King made Owen's ideas more workable and practical. He thought that the working classes would need to set up cooperatives for themselves, seeing his role as one of instruction. He founded a monthly periodical called The Co-operator, the first edition of which appeared on 1 May 1828. This provided a mixture of cooperative philosophy and practical advice about running a shop using cooperative principles.

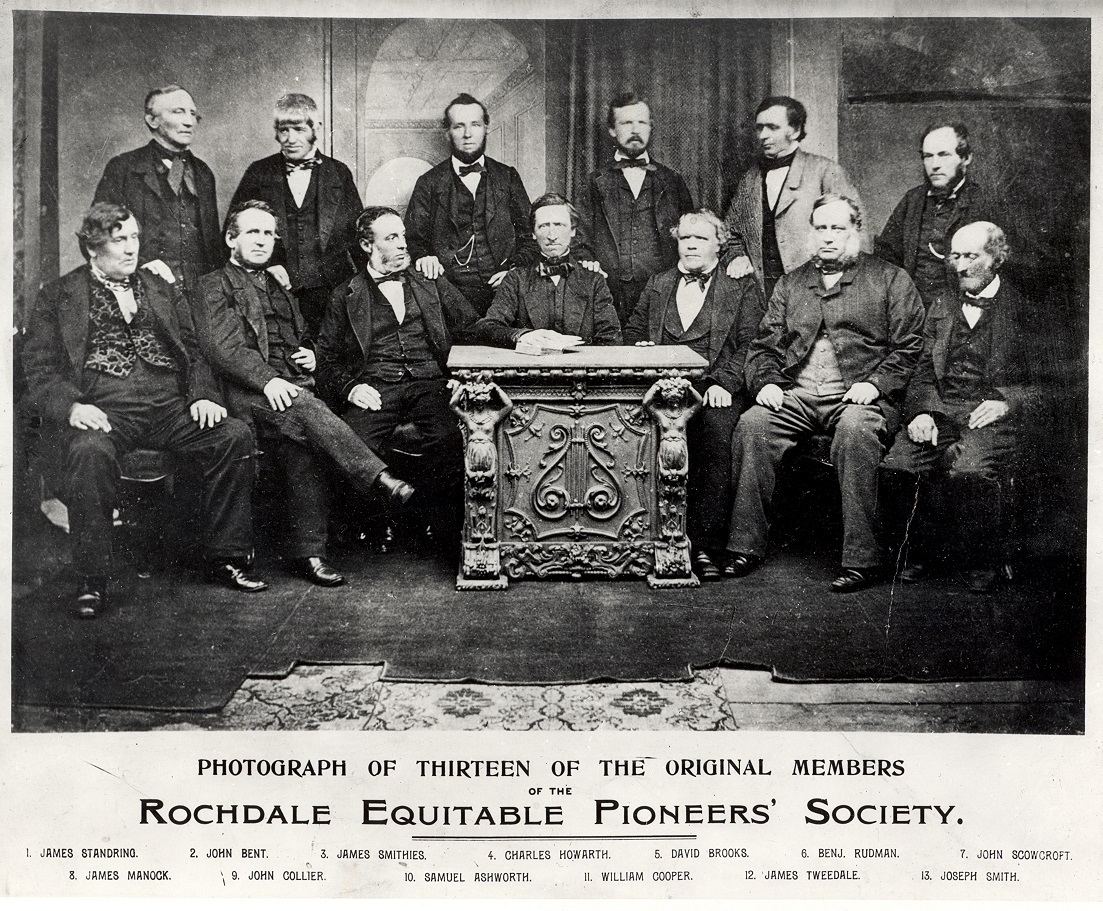
The Rochdale Society of Equitable Pioneers was established in 1844 and defined the modern cooperative movement.

The first successful cooperative organization was the consumer-owned Rochdale Society of Equitable Pioneers, established in England in 1844. The Rochdale Pioneers established the Rochdale Principles on which they ran their cooperative. This became the basis for the development and growth of the modern cooperative movement. As the mechanization of the Industrial Revolution was forcing more and more skilled workers into poverty, these tradesmen decided to band together to open their own store selling food items they could not otherwise afford.

With lessons from prior failed attempts at cooperation in mind, they designed the now-famous Rochdale Principles and, over a period of four months, struggled to pool one pound sterling per person for a total of 28 pounds of capital. On 21 December 1844, they opened their store with a very meager selection of butter, sugar, flour, oatmeal, and a few candles. Within three months, they expanded their selection to include tea and tobacco and were soon known for providing high quality, unadulterated goods.

By 1880, some 200 cooperatives had been started in Britain, but they were generally short-lived, and by 1975, only 19 remained.

The international organization representing worker cooperatives is CICOPA. CICOPA has two regional organizations: CECOP: CICOPA Europe and CICOPA Americas.

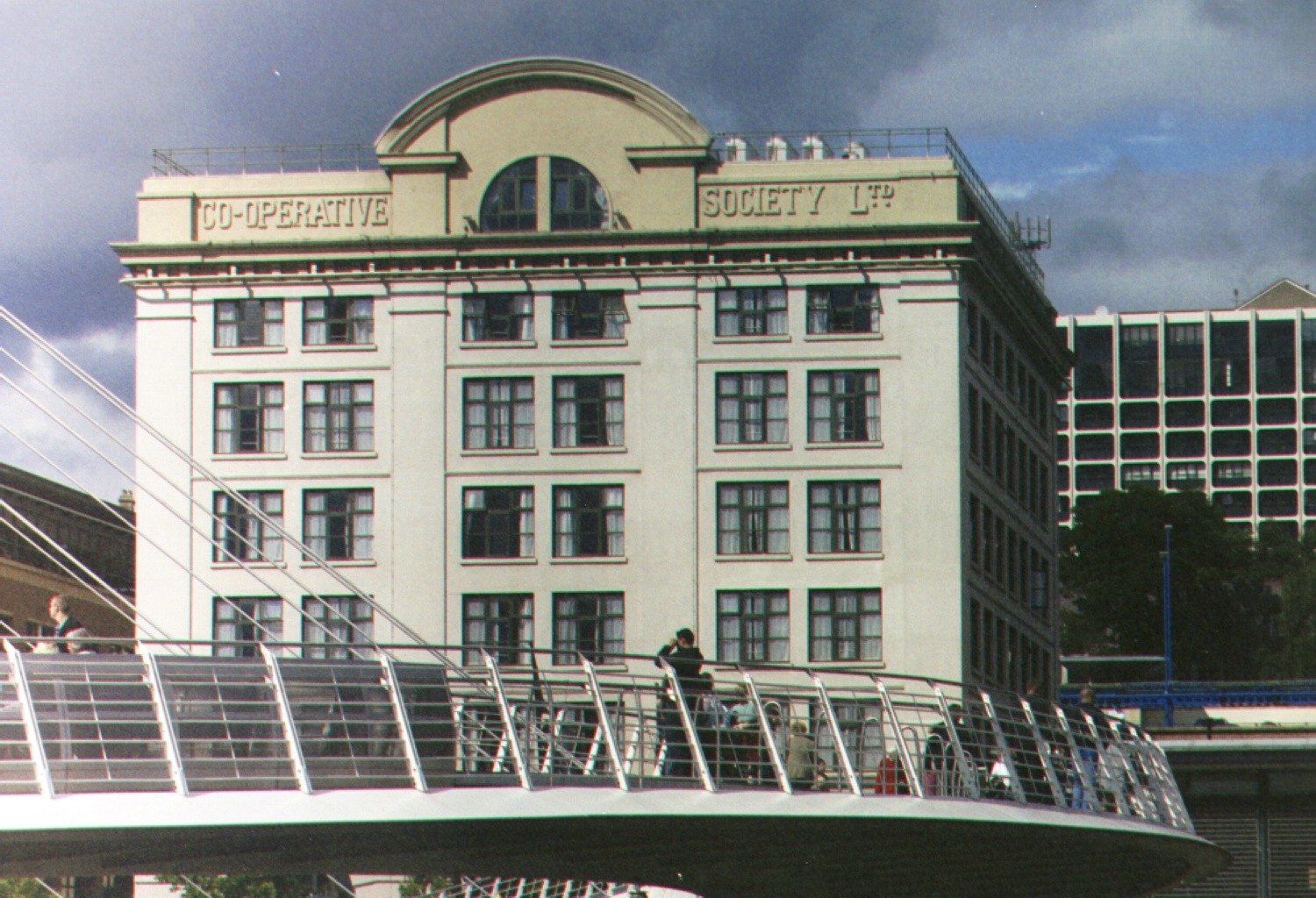
The old Co-operative building behind the Gateshead Millennium Bridge in Newcastle upon Tyne

When the current cooperative movement resurfaced in the 1960s, it developed mostly around a new system of "collective ownership" in which par value shares were issued as symbols of egalitarian voting rights. Typically, a member may own only one share to maintain the egalitarian ethos. Once brought in as a member and after a period of probation, usually so the new candidate can be evaluated, they would be given the power to manage the coop without "ownership" in the traditional sense. In the U.K., this system is known as common ownership.

In Britain, this type of cooperative was traditionally known as a producer cooperative, and while it was overshadowed by the consumer and agricultural types, it also made up a small section of its own within the national apex body, the Cooperative Union. The new wave of worker cooperatives that took off in Britain in the mid-1970s joined the Industrial Common Ownership Movement (ICOM) as a separate federation. Buoyed up by the alternative and ecological movements and by the political drive to create jobs, the sector peaked at around 2,000 enterprises. However, the growth rate slowed, the sector contracted, and in 2001 ICOM merged with the Co-operative Union (which was the federal body for consumer cooperatives) to create Co-operatives UK, thus reunifying the cooperative sector.

Since 2006, Co-operatives UK's Worker Cooperative Council has written and updated a worker cooperative code, the booklet that "sets out what anyone should expect and should work together to achieve, as a member of a worker co-operative".

In 2018, Google announced a $1 million grant to a platform cooperative development kit in collaboration with five pilot cooperatives, which are all worker-owned.

== Comparison with other work organizations ==
There are significant differences between ends and means between firms where capital controls labor or firms where the state controls both labor and capital. These distinctions are easily seen when measured by essential elements of commerce: purpose, organization, ownership, control, sources of capital, distribution of profits, dividends, operational practices, and tax treatment. The following chart compares the commercial elements of capitalism, state ownership, and cooperative worker-ownership. It is based on US rules and regulations.

| Commercial criteria | For-profit corporations | State-owned enterprises | Worker cooperatives |
|---|---|---|---|
| Purpose | a) To earn profit for owners, to increase the value of shares. | a) To provide goods and services, or hold and manage resources for citizens. | a) To maximize net and real worth of all owners. |
| Organization | a) Organized and controlled by investors b) Incorporated under relevant incorporation laws – varies by country c) Except for closely held companies anyone may buy stock d) Stock may be traded in the public market | a) Organized and controlled by state b) Chartered by relevant level of government c) No stock d) n/a | a) Organized and controlled by worker-members b) Incorporated under relevant incorporation laws – varies by country c) Only worker-members may own stock, one share per member d) No public sale of stock |
| Ownership | a) Stockholders | a) State | a) Worker members |
| Control | a) By Investors b) Policies set by stockholders or board of directors. c) Voting on basis of shares held d) Proxy voting permitted | a) By state b) Policy set by government planners. c) n/a d) n/a | a) By worker-members b) Policy set by directors elected by worker-members, or by assembly of worker-members c) One person, one vote d) Proxy votes seldom allowed |
| Sources of capital | a) Investors, banks, pension funds, the public b) From profitable subsidiaries or by retaining all or part of the profits | a) The state | a) By members or by lenders who have no equity or vote b) From net earnings, a portion of which are set aside for reinvestment |
| Distribution of net margin | a) To stockholders on the basis of the number of shares owned | a) To the State | a) To members after funds are set aside for reserves and allocated to a collective account |
| Capital dividends | a) No limit, amount set by owner or Board of Directors | a) n/a | a) Limited to an interest-like percentage set by policy |
| Operating practices | a) Owners or managers order production schedules and set wages and hours, sometimes with union participation b) Working conditions determined by labor law and collective bargaining. | a) Managers order production schedules and set wages and hours, sometimes with union participation b) Working conditions determined by labor law and collective bargaining | a) Workers set production schedules either through elected boards and appointed managers or directly through assemblies b) Working conditions determined by labor law and assembly of worker-members, or internal dialogue between members and managers. |
| Tax treatment | a) Subject to normal corporate taxes | a) n/a | a) Special tax treatment in some jurisdictions |

=== Longevity and resilience ===
Cooperatives have a higher survival rate than traditional firms, which seems to be due to greater employment stability and workers' willingness to make adjustments to allow the firm to survive, rather than other proposed explanations such as greater productivity or financial strength. According to an analysis of all businesses in Uruguay between 1997 and 2009, worker cooperatives had a 29% lower chance of closure after controlling for variables such as industry. In Italy, worker-owned cooperatives created by workers buying a business when it is facing a closure or is put up for sale have a three-year survival rate of 87%, compared to 48% for all Italian businesses. A 2012 study of Spanish and French worker cooperatives found that they "have been more resilient than conventional enterprises during the economic crisis." In France, the three-year survival rate of worker cooperatives is 80–90%, compared to the 66% overall survival rate for all businesses. During the 2008 economic crisis, the number of workers in worker-owned cooperatives in France increased by 4.2%, while employment in other businesses decreased by 0.7%. More than three quarters of UK coop start-ups (76%) were still flourishing after the difficult first five years, while other business forms were far less likely to survive; only 42% of all new UK companies made it through to the end of year five.

=== Employment stability ===
Employment in worker-owned firms tends to be more stable than conventional firms, which fluctuates more. This was attributed to conventional firms fixing wages and having to lay off employees during times of economic difficulty. In an investor-owned firm (IOF), workers would not accept a wage cut since they could not guarantee restoration of their original wages at a later date, while in a cooperative, workers can accept a wage cut since they know they can restore it at a later date. Research has suggested that the primary appeal of a cooperative for its members is in security of employment, as workers can actually become decoupled from a cooperative's ostensible worker ownership due to a mixture of interests and the more individualistic values of more recent workers. This makes secure employment, particularly in economically precarious times, a major draw. While it has been suggested that cooperatives could be a solution to unemployment, research indicates that this is unlikely to be the case.

=== Pay ===
Worker cooperatives tend to have a more compressed wage distribution, which can discourage high-ability workers and potentially cause the cooperative to suffer a "brain drain" as they leave to seek higher wages elsewhere, though this effect is less of an issue in cooperatives with less compressed wage distributions. Hiring managers from capitalist firms can be very difficult because of the lower wages. In the Mondragon Corporation, the world's largest worker cooperative, the pay ratio between the lowest and the highest earners was 1:9 in 2018. The ratio is decided by a democratic vote of the worker-members. In France, the pay ratio between the highest- and lowest-paid 10% of employees is 14% lower in worker cooperatives than in otherwise similar conventional firms.

A 2006 study found that wages by coops pay in Italy were 15–16% lower on average than those paid by capitalist firms and were more volatile, while employment was more stable. After controlling for variables such as schooling, age, gender, occupation, industry, location, firm-size, user cost of capital, fixed costs, and deviations in real sales, this difference changed to 14%. The authors suggest this might be due to worker cooperatives being more likely than capitalist firms to cut wages instead of laying off employees during periods of economic difficulty, or to coop workers being willing to accept lower wages than workers in capitalist firms. A study of all firms in Uruguay concluded that, after controlling for variables such as industry, firm size, gender, age, and tenure, workers employed in worker-managed firms earn 3% higher wages than similar workers employed in conventional firms. However, this wage premium declines significantly as pay increases and becomes negative for top earners. A study by The Democracy Collaborative found that in the US, worker cooperatives can increase worker incomes by 70–80%.

According to research by Virginie Pérotin, which looked at two decades' worth of international data, the tendency toward greater wage flexibility and employment stability helps explain why some research finds higher and other research finds lower pay in worker cooperatives relative to conventional businesses.

=== Productivity ===
The evidence on whether cooperatives are more productive than IOFs is mixed, depending on the location and sector. Research indicates that employee ownership can improve company performance, increase firm stability, increase survival rates, and reduce layoffs during a crisis, though the effect is small and represents only an average, meaning that it does not necessarily guarantee benefits. A 2016 meta-analysis concluded that employee ownership had a small positive effect on firm performance but no effects on efficiency or growth-related outcomes. According to Virginie Pérotin's research, which looked at two decades' worth of international data, worker cooperatives are more productive than conventional businesses. Another 1987 study of worker cooperatives in Italy, the UK, and France found "positive" relationships with productivity. It also found that worker cooperatives do not become less productive as they get larger. A 1995 study of worker cooperatives in the timber industry in Washington state, US, found that "co-ops are more efficient than the principal conventional firms by between 6 and 14 percent". In agriculture, coops tend to be more productive.

Some researchers have argued that while cooperatives can have higher performance in some circumstances, there is generally little difference in performance between cooperatives and conventional firms and that, ultimately, they are, on average, just as productive as each other. A 2012 study of Basque worker cooperatives by Basterretxea and Martinez found that they do not differ in innovation or management capabilities from conventional firms. This was possibly due to their size, environmental factors, networking, and support from other cooperatives such as the Mondragon Corporation.

In Portugal, cooperatives were found to be significantly less productive than IOFs in some analyses while other analyses were inconclusive, but there was no evidence that they were more productive in any industry. A study by Faleye et al concluded that: "[co-ops] deviate more from value maximization, invest less in long-term assets, take fewer risks, grow more slowly, create fewer new jobs, and exhibit lower labor and total factor productivity."

Kazuhiko Mikami writes that worker cooperatives are generally perceived as less competitive and less profitable than investor-owned firms. One reason given is that in an attempt to increase income per worker, the firm will restrict membership and operate at a sub-optimal production level. Another potential issue is financial viability; while capitalist firms can have permanent equity capital by selling stock which can be traded among investors, cooperative equity capital is inherently variable and dependent on member entry and exit. The membership is not marketable, and members aiming to withdraw and recoup their investment must redeem their membership with the firm. Alternatively, the cooperative may use debt capital, but without collateral, this requires high interest payments, and a large amount of debt risks the firm defaulting. However, those with tradeable membership shares could, in principle, be as efficient and financially viable as capitalist firms

=== Worker satisfaction, trust, health and commitment ===
Evidence comparing co-op worker satisfaction to firm worker satisfaction is somewhat mixed, but tends to favor co-ops. Workers at cooperatives tend to report higher levels of involvement in their tasks, more positive evaluations of supervisors, and greater fairness in their perception of the wages they receive and methods of payment. According to a study drawing on a questionnaire administered to the population of the Italian province of Trento, worker cooperatives are the only form of enterprise that fosters social trust between employees. A survey conducted in Seoul suggests that in conventional firms, employees become less committed to their job as their work becomes more demanding; however, this was not the case in worker cooperatives. In the US, home health aides in worker cooperatives were significantly more satisfied with their jobs than in other agencies. A 2013 study of home health aides found that "Home health aides at the worker-owned, participative decision-making organization were significantly more satisfied with their jobs than those in other agencies." A 1995 study from the US also indicates that "employees who embrace an increased influence and participation in workplace decisions also reported greater job satisfaction" and a 2011 study in France found that worker-owned businesses "had a positive effect on workers' job satisfaction." A 2019 study indicates that "the impact on the happiness of workers is generally positive".

If workers are not satisfied with their work and participation, they can express their disengagement through higher rates of absenteeism. However, managers can refrain from proposing controversial but necessary changes if they feel that the workers would reject them.

=== Environment ===
A 1995 analysis published in Ecological Economics suggests that "cooperatives will tend to use natural resource inputs more efficiently and will be less growth oriented than corporations."

== By country ==
=== Europe ===
Worker co-operation is most established in the European countries of Italy, Spain, and France. The European Cooperative Statute established a framework in 2006 to help cooperatives operate throughout the European Economic Area.

==== France ====
Workers' associations were legalized in 1848 and again in 1864. In 2004 France had 1700 workers' co-operatives, with 36,000 workers. The average size of a co-operative was 21 employees. More than 60% of co-operative employees were also members.

==== Germany ====
According to a publication by Deutscher Genossenschaftsund Raiffeisenverband, there were 7000 active cooperatives in Germany in 2024, of which 83 were classified as worker cooperatives.

In 2022 a new initiative called #GenoDigital started political work to modernize German cooperative law. Due to their efforts, many cooperative procedures can now be conducted digitally, among them accepting new members and holding member assemblies via video conference.

==== Italy ====
According to EURICSE there are 29,414 worker cooperatives in Italy as of 2019. A study conducted by the organization measured the survival rates of worker buyouts (WBOs) of failed firms that transitioned to worker cooperatives in the manufacturing sector; they found that they generally had greater rates of survival than the average for all Italian businesses in the same sector.

Pencavel et al. (2006) found that in the north of Italy, where the most co-ops are located (employing around over 4% of the labour force), paid their workers 14% less than capitalist firms and their wages were more volatile. This was after controlling for various variables, such as schooling, age, gender, occupation, industry, location, firm-size, user cost of capital, fixed costs, and deviations in its real sales.

The cooperative movement in Emilia-Romagna, Italy, merges both Catholicism and socialism.

==== Spain ====
Spain is home to over 17,000 worker cooperatives. One of the world's best known examples of worker cooperatives is the Mondragón Cooperative Corporation in the Basque Country.

==== United Kingdom ====
In the United Kingdom, the Labour Party's enthusiasm for worker cooperatives was at its highest in the 1970s and 1980s, with Tony Benn being a prominent advocate. The principle has also found some support from the more radical wing of the Liberal Democrats, such as from Michael Meadowcroft.

A small number of such co-operatives were formed during the 1974 Labour Government as worker takeovers following the bankruptcy of a private firm in an attempt to save the jobs at risk. However the change in ownership structure was usually unable to resist the underlying commercial failure. This was true of the best known, the Meriden motor-cycle cooperative in the West Midlands which took over the assets of the ailing company Triumph, although there were instances of successful employee buy-outs of nationalized industries in the period, notably National Express. Meanwhile, many more worker co-operatives were founded as start-up businesses, and by the late 1980s there were some 2,000 in existence. Since then the number has declined to about 400 in 2022.

Co-operatives are typically registered under either the Companies Act 2006 or the Co-operative and Community Benefit Societies Act 2014 (IPS), though other legal forms are available. A number of model rules have been devised to enable cooperatives to register under both acts; for workers' cooperatives, these rules restrict membership to those who are employed by the workplace. Most workers' co-operatives are incorporated bodies, which limits the liability if the co-operative fails and goes into liquidation.

The largest examples of a British worker cooperatives include, Suma Wholefoods, Bristol-based Essential Trading Co-operative, and the Brighton-based Infinity Foods Workers Co-operative.

In 2022 a new federation of worker co-operatives in the UK, workers.coop, was founded.

=== North America ===
==== United States ====
States in the United States which have laws allowing for creation of worker cooperatives.

===== National organization =====
The United States Federation of Worker Cooperatives is the only organization in the US representing worker cooperative interests nationally. It offers a voice on national level, promotes the co-op model, unites co-ops at conferences and provides a base of support and technical assistance to them.

In 2018, as part of the National Defense Authorization Act for Fiscal Year 2019, the Main Street Employee Ownership Act, drafted by senator Kirsten Gillibrand and representative Nydia Velázquez, was signed into law. It allows for employee-owned businesses to be eligible for SBA section (7)a loans for the first time.

===== Regional organizations =====
In addition to the Eastern Conference for Workplace Democracy and Western Worker Co-operative Conference, Cooperation Jackson is a federation of cooperatives based in Jackson, Mississippi, which seeks to build worker-owned coops and other locally operated institutions.

==== By state ====
Several states have enacted statutes to enable incorporation of worker cooperatives, with Massachusetts being the first in 1982. Illinois in 2019 was the first to allow the creation of limited worker cooperative associations, a form of limited cooperative association.

| State | Statute | Legislation | Date passed | Date in effect |
|---|---|---|---|---|
| Alabama | Ala. Code §§ 10a-11-1.01 to 10a-11-1.01 | HB 156/Act 97-949 | 23 September 1997 | |
| California | Cal. Corp. Code §§12200 to 12656.5 | AB 816 | 12 August 2015 | |
| Connecticut | Conn. Gen. Stat. §§ 33-418f to 33-418o | | | |
| Delaware | 6 DE Code § 1401 to 1414 | | 1996 | |
| Illinois | 805 ILCS 317/21 | | 9 August 2019 | 1 January 2020 |
| Kentucky | Ky. Rev. Stat. § 272.010 | | | |
| Maine | 13 Me. Rev. Stat. Ann. §§ 1971 to 1984 | | 1983 | |
| Massachusetts | Mass. Gen. Laws ch. 157A | | 1982 | |
| Michigan | Mich. Comp. Laws. Ann. §§ 450.731 to 450.738 | | 1985 | |
| Nevada | NV Rev Stat § 81.901 to 81.959 | Nev. Rev. Stat. AB 432, §§ 2 to 31 | 28 May 2019 | |
| New Jersey | N.J. Stat. Ann. §§ 34-17-1 to 34-17-18 | | | |
| New York | N.Y. Coop. Corp. §§ 80 to 94 | | | |
| Oregon | Or. Rev. Stat. §§ 62.765 to 62.792 | | 1987 | |
| Pennsylvania | Pa. Cons. Stat. Ann. §§ 7701 to 7726 | | 1988 | |
| Puerto Rico | P.R. Laws Ann. tit. 5, §§ 4570 to 4577 | | | |
| Rhode Island | RI Gen L § 7-6.2-1 | HB 6155 | 4 October 2017 | |
| Vermont | Vt. Stat. Ann. tit. 11 §§ 1081 to 1092 | | 1985 | |
| Virginia | VA Code § 13.1-346 to 13.1-355 | HB 55 | 6 April 2020 | 1 July 2020 |
| Washington | Wash. Rev. Code §§ 23.78.010 to 23.78.902 | | 1987 | |

==== Canada ====
Worker co-ops in Canada are represented by the Canadian Worker Co-op Federation (CWCF). Members of the CWCF are found throughout English Canada. Ontario has its own federation with developed standards.

==== Mexico ====
After the revolt on 1 January 1994 from EZLN, the indigenous people in Chiapas started the reconstruction of their Zapatista coffee cooperatives.

=== South America ===
==== Venezuela ====
Hugo Chávez, in his effort to democratize the workforce, established many worker-owned and operated cooperatives the moment he got into office in 1998. By 2006 there had been 100,000 worker co-ops set up, which represented around 1.5 million workers. Chàvez provided them cheap start-up credit, technical training, and preferential treatment with government purchases of goods and equipment. In 1999, he increased the number of co-ops that got tax incentives. A 2006 census showed that 50% of the co-ops were either functioning improperly or were created just to get access to public funds.

==== Argentina ====
In response to the economic crisis in Argentina from 1999 to 2002, many Argentine workers occupied the premises of bankrupt businesses and began to run them as worker-owned cooperatives. As of 2005, there were roughly 200 worker-owned businesses in Argentina, most of which were started in response to this crisis. By 2020, around 16,000 Argentine workers were running over 400 recuperated enterprises in Argentina. The 2004 film The Take documented this happening to a Forja auto plant, while Marcelo Vieta's book, Workers' Self-Management in Argentina, provides and extensive academic, case study, and historical account of the phenomenon. The overall survival rate of these recuperated firms is almost 90%.

According to a 2013 statement by the International Co-operative Alliance, cooperative businesses (most of which are not worker co-ops) in Argentina have nearly 20 million members across a number of business sectors from health care to housing to factory work and beyond. Over 6,000 of these businesses were created in 2012.

Worker-owned cooperatives in Argentina have played a role in developing their surrounding communities. For example, the worker-owners of FaSinPat voted to use excess profits to establish education programs, healthcare facilities, and recreational activities for its neighborhood.

The overall number of worker cooperatives within Argentina was over 23,000 as of April 2024.

=== Asia ===
==== India ====
The Indian Coffee Houses in India were started by the Coffee Board in the early 1940s, during British rule. In the mid-1950s the Board closed down the Coffee Houses due to a policy change. The thrown-out workers, under the leadership of A. K. Gopalan, then took over the branches and renamed the network as Indian Coffee House. Another very large network of worker coops is Kerala Dinesh Beedi, originally started by exploited beedi rollers.

== See also ==
- Market socialism
- Codetermination
  - Worker representation on corporate boards of directors
- Employee-owned corporation
- Employee stock ownership
- Industrial democracy
- Social ownership
- Syndicalism
- Workers' control
- Economic democracy
- Economics of participation
- Voluntary association
- Artel
- Collectives
- Benefit Corporation
- Democratic Education
- Housing Cooperative
- Employee ownership
- Workers' self-management
- Workplace democracy

Other workers' cooperative thinkers

- Michael Albert
- Hilaire Belloc
- Kevin Carson
- G. K. Chesterton
- G.D.H. Cole
- Robert A. Dahl
- Sam Dolgoff
- Noam Chomsky
- John Stuart Mill
- Gregory Dow
- David Ellerman
- Charles Gide
- David Griffiths
- George Holyoake
- Derek C. Jones
- William King
- Naomi Klein
- Michael Moore
- Robert Owen
- James Meade
- Mario Bunge
- Carole Pateman
- Friedrich Wilhelm Raiffeisen
- The Rochdale Pioneers
- David Schweickart
- José María Arizmendiarrieta
- E. F. Schumacher
- Stephen C. Smith
- Roger Spear
- Leland Stanford
- Jaroslav Vanek
- Beatrice Webb
- Sidney Webb
- William Foote Whyte
- Richard D. Wolff

Films about workers' cooperatives

- Anarchism in America
- Capitalism: A Love Story

== Sources ==
- Vieta, Marcelo (2020). Workers' Self-Management in Argentina. doi:10.1163/9789004268951. ISBN 978-90-04-26896-8.
