= Property and Contract in Economics =

1992 book by David P. Ellerman

Property and Contract in Economics: The Case for Economic Democracy
- Cover
- Author: David P. Ellerman
- Language: English
- Subject: Economic democracy, political economy, property theory, labor rights
- Publisher: Basil Blackwell
- Publication date: 1992
- Pages: 275
- ISBN: 978-1557863096
- Website: ellerman.org/property-and-contract/

Property and Contract in Economics: The Case for Economic Democracy is a 1992 book by David P. Ellerman. Ellerman argues that the twentieth-century debate between capitalism and state socialism was misconceived, as both systems share the institution of employment whereby workers are hired by an external party. The author draws an analogy with slavery. He contends that the substantive question is not whether slaves should be privately or publicly owned, but whether people should be slaves at all; similarly, the relevant question in economics is not whether workers should be employed by private firms or state enterprises, but whether they should be employed by others at all. The book develops a "labor theory of property," distinguished from the Marxian labor theory of value, which applies the juridical principle of imputation—that legal responsibility should follow factual responsibility—to economic production. Because only persons and not things can be responsible agents, Ellerman argues that workers should appropriate the positive and negative results of their labor. Human agency, he argues, cannot actually be transferred—which makes the employment contract, like the voluntary slavery contract, inherently invalid. He traces this claim through an intellectual history of inalienable rights theory. Ellerman terms his proposed alternative "economic democracy," understood as universal individual or joint self-employment in enterprises such as worker cooperatives and partnerships.

== Background ==
Ellerman's interest in worker self-management and cooperative enterprise developed over decades before the publication of the book. In the late 1970s, he co-founded the Industrial Cooperative Association, an organization devoted to promoting worker cooperatives in the United States. The book is based on his earlier work, including The Democratic Worker-Owned Firm (1990), which addressed the practical structure and governance of labor-managed enterprises. Ellerman critiques both Marxist and neoclassical economic thought, charging that they share what he calls a 'fundamental myth': the assumption that the right to the product and the right to govern workers are inherent in ownership of capital. He traces this error to Marx's acceptance of the medieval concept of 'Dominion,' in which control over workers and appropriation of the product were understood as attributes of landownership. Marx, on Ellerman's reading, simply substituted capital for land. This framing, Ellerman argues, obscures what he sees as the defining institution of modern economic systems: the employment contract, which operates the same way whether enterprises are privately or publicly owned. The book appeared shortly after the collapse of the Soviet Union, and Ellerman intended it partly as an intervention in debates over economic restructuring in the former Eastern Bloc, offering an alternative to both state socialism and conventional capitalist privatization.

== Summary ==
Ellerman argues that the twentieth-century debate between capitalism and socialism was fundamentally misconceived. He thinks that the dispute over whether workers should be employed by private enterprises or by the state missed the more essential question of whether people should be employed by others at all, rather than being individually or jointly self-employed. Ellerman invokes historical debates over slavery, arguing that the relevant distinction is not between private and public ownership of slaves, but between any form of servitude and universal self-ownership. By this reasoning, the genuine alternative to both capitalism and state socialism is what he calls 'economic democracy,' understood as universal self-employment in worker-owned enterprises. The book combines political theory, legal philosophy, and economic analysis, and Ellerman intended it partly to inform debates over the restructuring of former Soviet-bloc economies after the Cold War.

Ellerman begins by acknowledging the apparent triumph of markets and private property in the post-socialist moment, but asks whether western-style economies are themselves free of fundamental structural defects. The main text is organized into three parts containing fifteen chapters. The first two parts are written for the general reader; the third presupposes familiarity with upper-level undergraduate economics.

The first part takes up the concept of property, starting with what Ellerman calls the 'Fundamental Myth' of capitalist property rights: the widely shared assumption that the identity of a firm is determined by ownership of the means of production. Ellerman distinguishes between the de facto firm (the actual people involved in production) and the de jure firm (the legal party holding residual claimancy), arguing that no property right connects the two. Rather, the connection is established contractually through hiring arrangements. And since the contract direction can in principle be reversed, with labor hiring capital rather than capital hiring labor, the relationship between capital ownership and control of production is contingent rather than necessary. Ellerman then rehabilitates the concept of 'appropriation' for everyday production and develops a 'labor theory of property,' which he sharply distinguishes from the Marxian labor theory of value. He treats this theory as equivalent to the juridical principle of imputation: the standard legal norm that assigns responsibility to the party factually responsible for an outcome. Because only persons and not things can be held responsible for actions, Ellerman concludes that workers should legally appropriate both the positive fruits (outputs) and negative fruits (liabilities for used-up inputs) of their labor. A chapter on intellectual history traces the labor theory of property through John Locke, the Ricardian Socialists (Thomas Hodgskin, William Thompson, and John Francis Bray), Hegel, and John Stuart Mill. Part I closes with a discussion of common misinterpretations of the theory.

Ellerman devotes Part II to contract law, focusing on the employer-employee relationship and its historical antecedents: the voluntary self-sale contract and the Hobbesian pactum subjectionis (pact of political subjugation). Ellerman unearths a neglected intellectual history in which the most sophisticated defenses of slavery and autocracy in Western thought were grounded not in coercion but in consent, offering liberal arguments for the voluntary alienation of natural rights. Against this 'alienist' tradition, he recovers and restates an 'inalienist' countertradition descending from the Reformation and Enlightenment, particularly the doctrine of inalienable rights associated with Spinoza, Hutcheson, Rousseau, and figures in the Scottish and German Enlightenments. Ellerman's central claim is that because persons cannot in fact transfer their capacity for responsible action (a 'fact of nature,' as he puts it), any contract purporting to effect such a transfer, including the employment contract, is inherently invalid. He illustrates the point through cases of the criminous slave, the tortious servant, and the criminous employee, arguing that legal systems implicitly acknowledge the de facto inalienability of human agency whenever unlawful acts are committed.

In Part III, Ellerman applies these theoretical frameworks to economic theory. He identifies what he considers property-theoretic fallacies in capital theory and in general equilibrium theory, focusing on the Arrow-Debreu model's claim to demonstrate the possibility of competitive equilibrium with positive pure profits under decreasing returns to scale. This result, Ellerman argues, depends on treating firm identity as exogenously given; in a genuine competitive economy, anyone could bid for the inputs necessary to capture profitable production opportunities, driving profits to zero. He then takes on marginal productivity theory, critiquing it for treating nonhuman factors of production as if they were responsible agents rather than instruments used by labor. A single corn-and-labor input-output model allows him to compare marginal productivity theory, the Marxian labor theory of value and exploitation, and the labor theory of property.

Ellerman reads the Marxian theory as ultimately reducing to a 'just-price' critique based on a benchmark of zero interest rates, rather than a theory about workplace power relations. All of this leads to what Ellerman calls the 'Fundamental Theorem of Property Theory': a mismatch between legal and factual responsibility in production implies a corresponding mismatch between legal and factual transfers in exchange.

== Critical reception ==
Stephen C. Smith called the work "a challenging book in every sense of the term," one that mounts "a sweeping and highly original critique of both neoclassical and Marxian economic theory." The analysis of the history of the labor theory of property, carefully distinguished from the labor theory of value, struck him as "an original and insightful examination" and "a major, important contribution to the history of economic thought." Smith saw in the book a reversal of the conventional "law and economics" approach: Ellerman treats legal principles as the basis for correct economic thinking rather than the other way around. Yet while the analysis was "intriguing and stimulating," Smith found that it seemed "to leave some loose ends," including unresolved questions about insurance, the role of capital owners who monitor firm performance, and whether legal consistency alone was sufficient to establish the argument. Unable to pin down fundamental logical flaws, Smith wrote that "the book deserves to be read and debated, then, above all by comparative economists, who should be in the best position among those in the profession to judge it by its own merits.

British social economist Pat Devine described the work as "stimulating" and "full of insights, with some telling criticisms of economic theory." Devine found that the analysis effectively separated institutional forms from underlying non-institutional realities, though he observed that at times the text "reads almost like a tract, which tends to undermine the reader's confidence." He raised a substantive objection concerning the recommended model of employee-owned enterprises competing in a market economy: he reminded that this same model appeared in contemporary versions of market socialism claiming to be based on social ownership, and that neither approach addressed questions arising when economic democracy is understood to include conscious democratic control over the overall allocation of resources.

Colin Lawson of the University of Bath called the work an "important book" that demonstrated "there was, is and always has been a third way" between capitalism and communism. Lawson acknowledged "a very strong element of advocacy in the argument, indeed also sometimes in the tone in which the book is written," but held that this should not detract from "a strong and subtle argument which deserves a wide audience." The book was "much more than simply an essay in persuasion," in his view, amounting to "a major contribution to our understanding of both the philosophic basis of economic organization and to the analysis of the implications for economic theory of alternative philosophic approaches.

Mark A. Lutz called the work "wholly innovative, deeply challenging accepted interpretations and highly relevant in the post-Cold War times." He found the author's "basic logic" to be "quite impeccable and resistant to attack," and praised the book as "a most able and creatively constructive articulation of social economics in the humanistic tradition." Lutz did raise several reservations: he questioned the claimed continuity with the nineteenth-century Ricardian Socialists, identified complications arising from monopoly power and externalities that the theory did not address, and argued that existing jurisprudence, especially the long-established doctrine of vicarious liability, was "simply not on Ellerman's side" with respect to the critique of the employment contract.

Don Lavoie of George Mason University described the work as "among the most powerful critiques of mainstream economics ever developed," praising its articulation of a labor theory of property distinct from both Marxism and neoclassical economics. He considered it "the better case for its economic democracy viewpoint than anything else in the literature."

== Publication history ==
The book went out of print, was suddenly removed from Blackwell's catalog, and rights reverted to the author in 2000. Ellerman has since made the full text freely available as a PDF on his website.
