= David N. Weil =

American economist (born 1960)

David Nathan Weil
- Born: 1960 (age 65–66)
- Title: James and Merryl Tisch Professor of Economics

Academic background
- Education: Brown University; Harvard University
- Doctoral advisors: Lawrence F. Katz; Greg Mankiw; Lawrence Summers

Academic work
- Institutions: Brown University
- Doctoral students: Sebnem Kalemli-Ozcan

David Nathan Weil (born 1960) is the James and Merryl Tisch Professor of Economics at Brown University. Weil's scholarship has focused on economic growth and demographic economics. Between 2015 and 2018, Weil chaired Brown's Department of Economics.

== Education and research ==
Weil received a Bachelor of Arts in history from Brown University in 1982. Two faculty members there who particularly influenced his later career path were Naomi Lamoreaux and John Vernon Henderson. He completed his doctorate in economics at Harvard University in 1990.

Weil's most famous paper is “A Contribution to the Empirics of Economic Growth”, which was coauthored with Greg Mankiw and David Romer, published in the Quarterly Journal of Economics in 1992. The paper argues that the Solow growth model, once augmented to include a role for human capital, explains reasonably well international differences among countries in standards of living and rates of economic growth. According to Google Scholar, it has been cited more than 26,000 times, which makes it one of the most cited articles in the field of economics.

Along with Mankiw he also wrote several other well-known papers. "The Baby Boom, the Baby Bust, and the Housing Market" examined the demographic determinants of housing demand and predicted that the aging of baby boomers would undermine the housing market in the 1990s and 2000s. "An Asset Allocation Puzzle" (American Economic Review, 1995, with Mankiw and Niko Canner) argued that popular advice on portfolio allocation among cash, bonds, and stocks is inconsistent with the mutual-fund separation theorem, which states that all investors should hold the same composition of risky assets.

Weil has made multiple significant contributions to studying the interplay between demographics and economic growth. With Oded Galor, Weil wrote: "The Gender Gap, Fertility, and Growth" and "Population, Technology, and Growth: From Malthusian Stagnation to the Demographic Transition and Beyond". The latter paper presented a "unified" model of growth that could explain the entire transition from the stagnant technology and living standards that characterized most of human history to the current era of constant economic growth, with living standards far above subsistence. He also wrote "The Effect of Fertility Reduction on Economic Growth" with Quamrul Ashraf and Joshua Wilde, which estimates the size of the Demographic Dividend which could accrue to countries moving from high to low fertility regimes.

Other papers on the determinants of economic growth include "Appropriate Technology and Growth" with Susanto Basu; "Saving and Growth with Habit Formation" with Christopher Carroll and Jody Overland; "Accounting for the Effect of Health on Economic Growth"; and "Post-1500 Population Flows and The Long-Run Determinants of Economic Growth and Inequality" with Louis Putterman; and "The Global Distribution of Economic Activity: Nature, History, and the Role of Trade" with John Vernon Henderson, Tim Squires, and Adam Storeygard).

With Henderson and Storeygard, Weil wrote "Measuring Economic Growth from Outer Space" (American Economic Review, 2012), which was one of the first papers to explore the possibility of using satellite data on night lights as a proxy when official figures were missing or of low quality.
