= Brighton Voice =

Alternative newspaper published in Brighton, England (1973–1989)

- Owner: Collectively owned
- Editor: Edited by an Open Collective
- Founded: March 1973
- Ceased publication: July 1989
- City: Brighton
- Country: England
- Circulation: 1000 (average)

Brighton Voice was an alternative or underground newspaper published in Brighton, England in the 1970s and 1980s.

== History ==
Brighton Voice was one of the many alternative local newspapers that sprung up in the United Kingdom in the 1960s and 1970s. With a launching statement describing its aim as "giving a voice to ordinary people" the first issue was published in March 1973. It was started by just two people, an academic at the University of Sussex and a printer at the university, for whom the "reason for starting the paper was opposition to state power, locally and nationally" and who claimed to find the "chic radicalism of Brighton insufferably boring". The initial team of two rapidly expanded to five and within three months there were up to 50 people volunteering to assist.

Its operation was made possible by the arrival of inexpensive offset printing that permitted printing without typesetting. Before the arrival of Desktop Publishing it was typed, with the typewritten sections pasted up onto master sheets using Cow Gum, with headlines in Letraset. The first 66 issues were in A4, but from issue 67 the Voice changed to A3 newsprint and from Issue 72 to A2 newsprint. It was first printed by Voice personnel on a small press owned by a member of the collective and then at a squat in Islington, North London but printing was quickly moved back to Brighton. In the early days doing the printing yourself was part of the philosophy of those involved. Bankruptcy of the printer and a subsequent suspicious fire meant that printing had to be moved back to London on two occasions, to be printed by another alternative paper, the Islington Gutter Press. Later, to accommodate the new format, it was printed in Bristol.

Early issue of Brighton Voice

The Voice was listed in Ulrich's Periodicals Directory and Benn's Media Directory. It ceased publication with issue No 132 in July 1989, making it one of the longest-running alternative papers in the United Kingdom. By the late 1980s it was facing competition from the growth of commercial listings magazines in Brighton such as The Punter, and the emergence of more extreme anarchist papers such as Brighton Bomber, neither of which has survived.

Brighton Voice was intended to be issued monthly but usually managed about nine issues a year. The collective approach, which allowed anyone who wanted to turn up at monthly editorial meetings and to participate in production, led to slow decision making and lengthy editorial meetings. These were initially held in people's homes although in the early days it was difficult to find space for all those who wanted to contribute. Subsequently, editorial meetings were held at the "Open Café”, an anarchist, whole-foods restaurant on Victoria Road in Brighton. The Voice was typed and laid out in the basement of the café. Subsequently, it moved to several other locations in Brighton and Hove.

Distribution of the magazine caused problems. Most newsagents were reluctant to stock it, either because of disagreement with the contents or fear of legal action. In 1976 the local Conservative Member of Parliament, Andrew Bowden, wrote to all the newsagents in his constituency advising them not to sell the Voice because the collective included "a number of left-wing extremists" responsible for "churning out deliberate lies and political filth". Two years later, local fascists responded to the Voice's campaign against the National Front by smashing windows of some newsagents. However, around 25 retailers remained faithful, with a dozen continuing to sell it to the end of its life.

Sales were highest at Infinity Foods Workers Co-operative, a whole foods shop that exists to this day, and on the University of Sussex campus but circulation amongst the ordinary citizens of Brighton and Hove was relatively patchy, despite street sales by members of the collective. Unsurprisingly it spoke mainly to the already committed. Circulation of the Voice never reached 2000, and sales over its lifetime averaged around 1000. The first issue was sold for 4 New Pence in 1973 (it was launched soon after decimalisation), rising, in two decades of high inflation, to 30 pence by the time of the final issue.

Unlike some other alternative newspapers in the UK the Voice received an insignificant proportion of its income from paid advertising. Also unlike some similar newspapers it received no outside support. While other papers received small subsidies from their local councils it would, as Aubrey et al pointed out, have been inconceivable for the Voice to be subsidised by the then Conservative-controlled Brighton Council, which it regularly attacked. Revenue was primarily generated from sales and the more affluent members of the collective inevitably provided some support.

Towards the end of its life the number of people working on the paper declined. By then a DTP system was being used and fewer people were needed to produce the paper. However, the lack of new blood coming in meant that enthusiasm dwindled. By Issue 125 there were only three people working on it and, eventually, it quietly died.

== Campaigns ==
The Voice followed broadly anarchist principles and functioned as a collective. It was essentially libertarian and dismissive of political parties and mainly aimed to expose what it saw as the self-interested and incompetent management of the then separate councils of Brighton and neighbouring Hove, now merged into the one authority of Brighton and Hove. Campaigns conducted included one against the construction of the Brighton Marina, and the Voice also made submissions to the Planning Enquiry for the marina. With others it also campaigned successfully against proposals to demolish Brighton railway station.

The Voice's major impact was probably in the area of housing. For several years it was the voice of the local Squatters Union. It concentrated on the scandalous housing situation in the town and was one of the first to highlight the practices of some Brighton landlords, most notably Nicholas Hoogstraten who subsequently spent time in jail. The newspaper took part in many demonstrations in Brighton and Hove, always using an all-purpose banner with the words "Brighton Voice says No".

The Voice also campaigned jointly with other organisations and published their newsletters as part of the paper. The Unemployed Workers Union published Doleful News as an insert and fully produced Issue 81 of the Voice. The paper developed close relationships with local union leaders, which led to copies of the Trades Council Bulletin being incorporated in the Voice. In its last years it also included the full programme for the annual Brighton Urban Free Festival (BUFF).

== Membership ==
Membership of the collective was open to all and rotated considerably. However, it was predominantly white, middle class and male. Anyone could participate and write a piece, as long as it was critical of the status quo. Initially it was considered inappropriate to edit contributions, but it was quickly realised that such an approach would lead to an unsaleable paper. Its first members included anarchists, Marxists and left-wing members of the Labour Party. The collective saw that the greatest impact could be achieved by responding to particular events rather than by following a particular dogma. Fearing legal action, contributions were anonymous, although the Tenth Birthday Issue departed from this practice when one of the founders, Roy Carr-Hill, contributed a signed piece.

Despite being open to all, the Voice rarely had more than eight active participants at any time. As Cottle points out, the fact that the collective had relatively few members may have contributed to its longevity. Other similar papers with larger collectives tended to cease publication after a relatively short time. Members of the collective at one time or another included Steve Bassam, who was Government Chief Whip in the House of Lords in 2008–09; Rod Kedward, a noted history professor at the University of Sussex; the investigative journalist Duncan Campbell, Mike Scott, a Brighton Social Worker, and the journalist Val Hennessy. One count reported that at least seven Voice contributors eventually ended up working in the national media, including the BBC. Others went on to work for the United Nations. Exposure by the Voice of misdoings in Brighton and Hove greatly benefited from insider tips provided by Adam Trimingham and Rowan Dore of the Brighton Evening Argus. Other local journalists, including Roy Greenslade, who subsequently became editor of the Daily Mirror, also provided tips.

== Copies ==
A complete set of copies of the Brighton Voice is available at the Brighton History Centre.

== See also ==
- SchNEWS
- List of underground newspapers of the 1960s counterculture
