= United States Federation of Worker Cooperatives =

Umbrella organization representing autonomous non-corporate businesses

- Company type: Cooperative federation
- Industry: Worker-owned enterprises
- Founded: 2004
- Headquarters: San Francisco, California, United States
- Area served: United States
- Key people: Melissa Hoover, Executive Director
- Revenue: 1,799,715 United States dollar (2022)
- Total assets: 1,296,463 United States dollar (2022)
- Members: Worker cooperatives, co-operative developers, worker co-operative regional networks and individuals
- Website: www.usworker.coop

The United States Federation of Worker Cooperatives (USFWC) is the national grassroots membership organization representing worker cooperatives and democratic workplaces. Its mission is to build a thriving ecosystem for worker-owned and controlled businesses and to empower their cooperative leaders to power movements for racial justice and economic democracy. USFWC was founded in 2004 by few core co-op members in collaboration with co-op developers, scholars, community organizers, and supporters from the wider co-op sector.

The Federation was sponsored by The Cooperative Foundation in addition to other cooperative support organizations. It was created partly in response to growing regional organizing among United States worker cooperatives and to foster the sharing of information and resources between national gatherings.

== Meetings ==
The membership meets annually. The Federation holds a biennial conference called The Democracy at Work Conference in conjunction with the annual meeting. The schedule for the meetings/conference is as follows:

- 2006 New York City (and Conference)
- 2008 New Orleans (and Conference)
- 2009 Madison
- 2010 San Francisco (and conference)
- 2011 Austin, Texas
- 2012 Boston (and conference)
- 2016 Austin (and conference)
- 2018 Los Angeles (and conference)

== Membership ==
USFWC membership classes:

- Worker Cooperatives include organizations that meet the standard for a democratic workplace according to the CICOPA World Declaration on Worker Co-operatives.
- Democratic Workplaces include organizations that may fall short of the World Declaration, but still exist as a democratic workplace such as democratic employee stock ownership plans (ESOP) owned by 100% of its workers.
- Federation Partners include any local and regional association of three or more workplaces.
- Cooperative Developers receive one vote per developer (or organization of developers).
- Start-up Workplaces include organizations that are either in start-up mode or transitioning to a worker co-operative from another type of business.
- Associates are organizations that support worker co-operatives and worker rights but are not worker co-operatives, collectives or democratic workplaces. Consumer co-operatives, labor unions, and ESOPs with less than 100% worker control are examples. This class does not have voting rights.
- Individual Allies may join the organization but do not have voting rights.

== Board of directors ==
The Federation is governed by a nine-member board of directors. The Board oversees the Federation and the Executive Director.
Members:

- Eastern Representative – Aaron Dawson
- Northern Representative – Rebecca Kemble
- Western Representative – Yilda Campos
- Southern Representative – Anna Boyer
- At Large Directors
  - Ben Mauer
  - David Smathers Moore
  - Scott Crow

== See also ==
- Worker cooperative
