= Val Hennessy =

British journalist

Val Hennessy is a British journalist who writes for the Daily Mail.

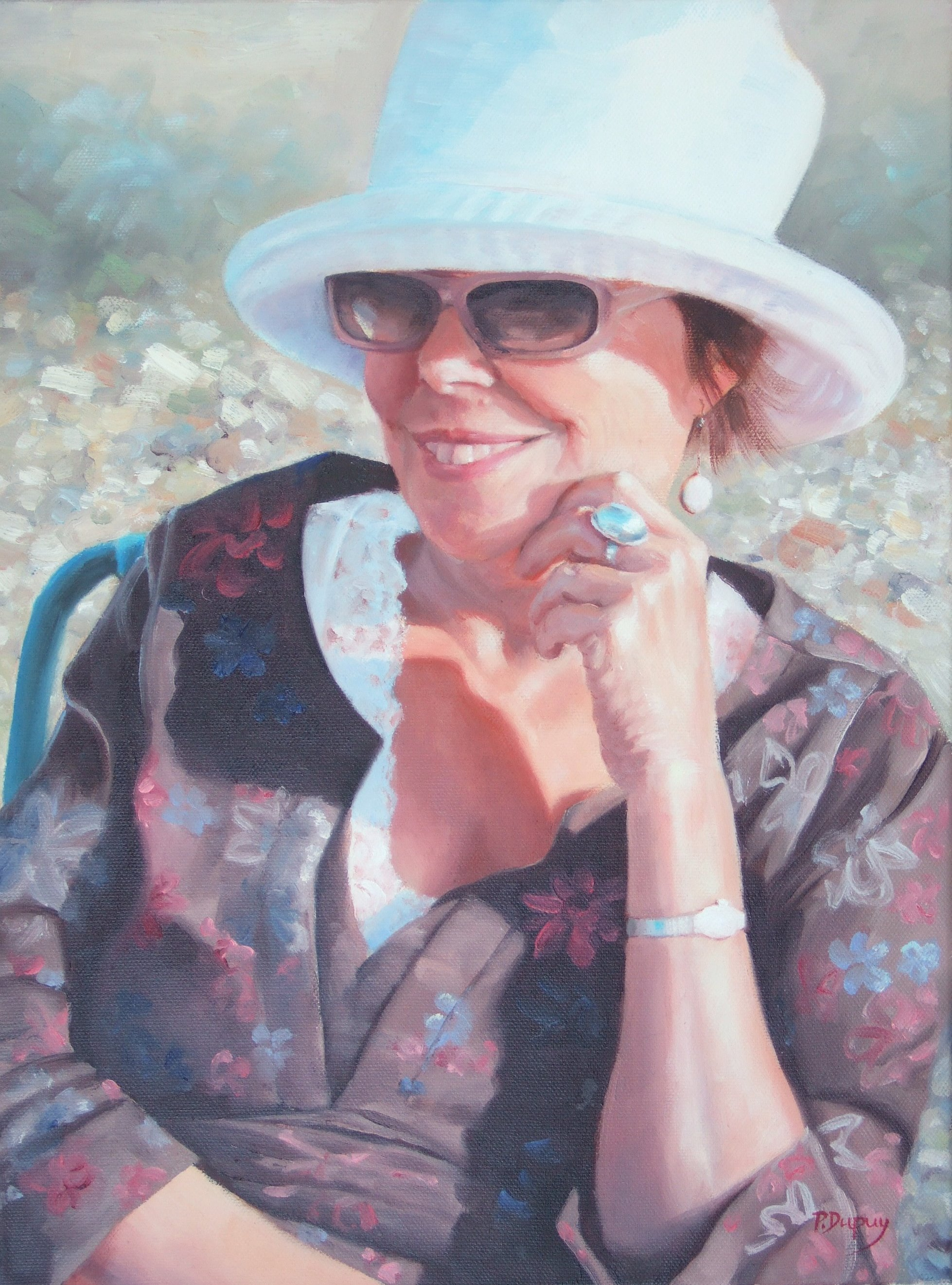
Val Hennessy, journalist, portrait by Phyllis Dupuy

== Career ==
Hennessy taught English and drama before commencing a writing and journalistic career with the Brighton Voice, Peace News and Big Scream.

Hennessy later became a Fleet Street freelance journalist, an associate editor of Time Out and a columnist for Saga Magazine. She was described by Auberon Waugh as "a handsome if elderly (by punk standards) and inescapably middle-class journalist". She is best known for her work as chief literary critic for the Daily Mail from 1989 to 2004. As of 2014, she continues to write for the Daily Mail's "Retro Reads" column. Having reviewed thousands of English fiction books, Hennessy is a significant critic of British women's writing. Hennessy has interviewed Luciano Pavarotti, Leonard Cohen, Bob Dylan, Annie Lennox, Michael Douglas, Terence Stamp, Martin Amis, Vivienne Westwood, Elizabeth Taylor, Bob Geldof, David Bailey, Jeffrey Archer, Germaine Greer, Laurie Lee and José Carreras.

Throughout her career, she has also written for The Guardian, The Observer, New Society, You Magazine, Spare Rib, City Limits, and London Evening Standard.

== Judging panels ==
In 1989, Hennessy was on the controversial judging panel of the (then) Whitbread Book Award, now known as the Costa Book Awards.

In 1995, she was a member of the AT&T Award for Non-fiction. Panel chair, Alan Clark, reduced the panel to laughter with his declaration that "No one may speak while the chairman is speaking and if you wish to speak, you must raise your hand". In 1996 Hennessy was one of "five leading women", "at the top of their respective professions" making up the inaugural panel of the (then) Orange, now Baileys Women's Prize for Fiction and commented vigorously on the quality of submissions by British women writers. As an early judge on this award, Hennessy's comments continued to be referenced by Emma Parker in the Contemporary Women Writers journal (2004) and John Ezard in The Independent (2005).

== Reviewing the reviewer ==
In a letter to Private Eye, Stephen Vizinczey credited Hennessy among a number of critics for taking his work seriously, but her reviews have not always made it on to a novel's dust jacket. The New York Times found "mixed messages" in her review of Spook: Science Tackles the Afterlife by Mary Roach, while Hennessy's review of A History of English Food by Clarissa Dickson Wright was cited as a demonstration of anti-intellectualism in the British media.

== Bibliography ==
- A Little Light Friction, Chambers, 1989, ISBN 024554786X
- In The Gutter, Quartet, 1978, ISBN 0704332302

In The Gutter received a mixed reception. Auberon Waugh called it an "admirable book" with "touches of a genuine philosophical nihilism", while Joe Donnelly wrote, "In the Gutter though far from perfect would be a great addition to any punks' collection, providing you can find a copy?" Lauded for the photographic record of the punk era, the book is now out of print and is in demand on the vintage book market.
