= Louis Putterman =

American economist (born 1952)

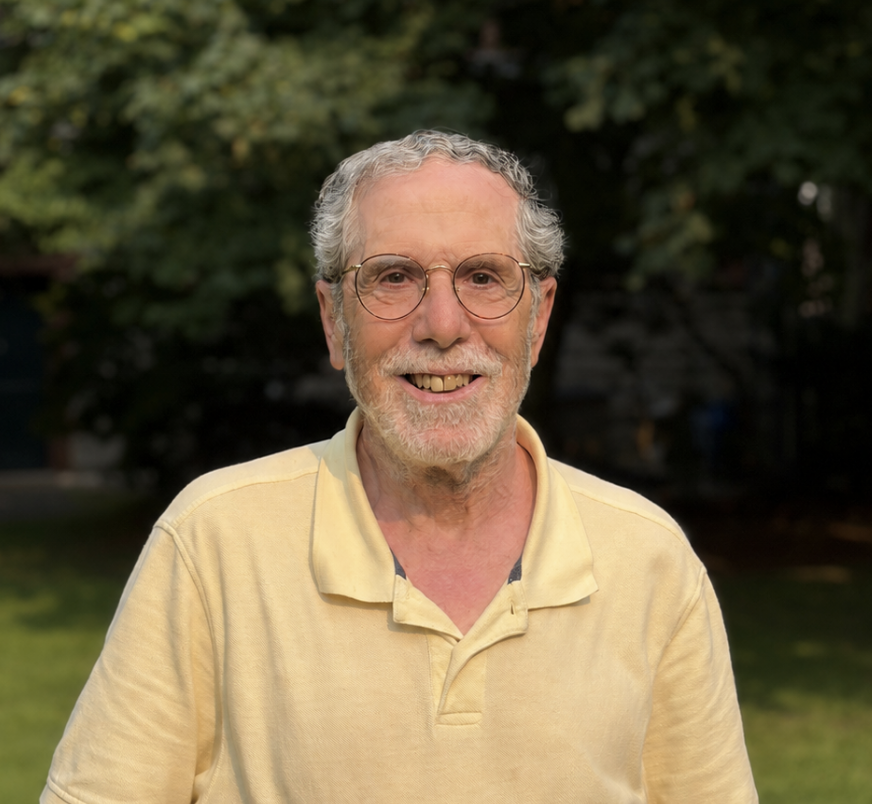

Academic background
- Education: Columbia University (B.A.); Yale University (Ph.D.)

Academic work
- Discipline: Development economics
- Institutions: Brown University
- Website: Information at IDEAS / RePEc

Louis G. Putterman (born 1952) is an American economist. He taught economics at Brown University from 1980 to 2025 and continues as a research professor there.

== Biography ==
Putterman received his B.A. in Economics (minor: Anthropology) from Columbia University in 1976, and his M.A. in International Relations in 1978 and Ph.D. in Economics in 1980 from Yale University. He joined the Brown University faculty after his doctoral studies and received a Sloan Research Fellowship in 1983. He is a specialist on comparative economic systems and comparative economic development and has written extensively on China's economic development and the long-term development of human capabilities. Part of his work has focused on using laboratory experiments to analyze the preferences and dispositions underlying human social interactions, especially solving problems of collective action. Putterman served as president of the Association for Comparative Economic Studies in 2000–2001.

== Research contributions ==
=== Behavioral and experimental economics ===
Beginning in the late 1990s, Putterman shifted his focus to behavioral economics and experimental economics through collaborations with Avner Ben-Ner of the University of Minnesota. His experimental work has examined cooperation, trust (social science), and punishment in laboratory settings, particularly through variants of public goods game and trust game. A significant focus of Putterman's experimental research, conducted with Brown colleague Talbot Page and others, has been investigating how institutional arrangements affect cooperative behavior. His work has explored how punishment mechanisms, communication, and democratic choice of rules influence outcomes in collective action problems. This research examines whether subjects respond differently when rules are chosen democratically versus imposed exogenously. Putterman has also participated in international survey projects that study trust and social preferences, including the OECD's TrustLab project, which conducted representative surveys in multiple countries examining trust in government, inter-group biases, and responses to the COVID-19 pandemic.

=== Long run comparative development ===
Putterman published research on relationships between pre-modern development indicators and modern economic outcomes. Papers co-authored with Burkett and Humblet (1999) and with Bockstette and Chanda (2002) presented statistical analysis of correlations between measures of pre-modern development and 20th century growth rates. Putterman and Trainor created a dataset of estimated agricultural transition dates for 165 countries. A 2008 paper used this data in regression analysis of year 2000 per capita income. Borcan, Olsson and Putterman (2018) analyzed state history data and reported that quadratic models showed different patterns than linear models. Putterman and David N. Weil (2010) constructed estimates of ancestral population origins using ethnic composition data and DNA studies. The paper presented regression results comparing models using ancestral versus territorial development histories. Chanda, Cook, and Putterman (2014) used Putterman and Weil's and other data to show that developmental outcomes show persistence when outcomes are predicted by the ancestry's of countries' modern populations, rather than the reversal of fortune highlighted by Daron Acemoglu, Simon Johnson (economist) and James A. Robinson. Jared Diamond (2012) discussed both papers in The New York Review of Books. The topic received media coverage following the 2024 Nobel Memorial Prize in Economic Sciences. Oded Galor and Ömer Özak (2016) used the Putterman-Weil ancestry matrix in their research.

=== Economics of organization ===
Putterman was introduced to the economics of organization through his doctoral advisor Sidney G. Winter, known for his evolutionary economics approach to studying firms. Early in his career, Putterman edited The Economic Nature of the Firm: A Reader, collecting classic papers on institutional, agency-theoretic, and heterodox approaches to enterprise organization. The volume had three editions, with the second and third co-edited with Randall Kroszner. Putterman published critiques of prevailing explanations for why capital hires labor rather than labor hiring capital in market economies. His 1984 paper "On Some Recent Explanations of Why Capital Hires Labor" challenged existing theories. A subsequent contribution examined how the bundling of profit rights, decision rights, and tradable claims determines enterprise structure.

=== Comparative economic systems ===
Putterman's research examined work incentives and efficiency in worker-owned firms, cooperatives, and collective farms. With John Bonin and Derek Jones, he surveyed the literature on worked-managed firms through the mid-1980s. With Gregory Dow, he co-authored a theoretical overview of the 'why capital hires labor, and not labor capital' question. His early work extended research by Amartya Sen on agricultural cooperation among poor farmers, with applications to Tanzania and China. He studied Tanzania's government-encouraged group farming initiatives and China's collective farming system. Putterman collaborated with Xiaoyuan Dong on studies of rural and urban industrial enterprise structure and performance in China's transition economy.

== Personal ==
Putterman grew up in Long Island, New York. Before earning his bachelor's degree, he spent three years engaged in agricultural work in kibbutz communities in Israel.
