= Jaroslav Vaněk =

Czech–American economist (1930–2017)

- Born: 20 April 1930; Prague, Czechoslovakia
- Died: 15 November 2017 (aged 87); Ithaca, New York, U.S.
- Occupation: Economist
- Known for: Studies about economics, on economics of participation (labour-managed firms, worker cooperatives), the theory of international trade

Academic background
- Doctoral advisor: Charles P. Kindleberger

Academic work
- Doctoral students: Alan Deardorff

Jaroslav Vaněk (20 April 1930 – 15 November 2017) was a Czech American economist and professor emeritus of Cornell University known for his research on economics of participation (labour-managed firms, worker cooperatives) and, in his earlier career, on the theory of international trade.

He graduated (matura) from a high-school in Prague, and left/emigrated shortly after the communist putsch of 1948. He received his diploma in statistics, mathematics and economics at the Sorbonne (1952), and a postgraduate degree in economics at the University of Geneva (1954). In 1955 he left for the US, where in 1957 he received his PhD from the Massachusetts Institute of Technology.

In 1964 he became professor of economics, and in 1969 of the international economics at Cornell University, where he directed from 1970 his program Participation and Labor Managed Systems, he also worked on strategies for its implementation in post-communist countries (1990s).

He was a visiting professor at the Belgrade's Institute of Economics (1972), the Catholic University of Louvain, Belgium (1974), the Netherlands Institute for Advanced Studies in Humanities and Social Sciences (1975–6) and the International Institute of Social Studies in The Hague (1978).

In 1971, Vaněk worked as an advisor to the government of Peru and in 1978–79 to the Prime Minister of Turkey. In addition, he advised a number of participatory enterprises/employee-owned companies worldwide. In 1986 he founded and since directs the STEVEN Foundation (Sustainable Technology and Energy for Vital Economic Needs) that develops technologies suitable for the developing countries.

He was an important contributor to the Heckscher–Ohlin model, which provides a macroeconomic attempt of explanation of international trade and countries' specializations.

Vaněk wrote The General Theory of Labour-Managed Market Economies, a seminal work on self-management. His work in the economics of participation included The Participatory Economy: An Evolutionary Hypothesis and a Strategy for Development which reviewed behaviour of labour-managed firms in more social spheres beyond their interests in net revenue per worker.

== Publications ==
- International Trade: Theory and Economic Policy, 1962
- The Natural Resource Content of United States Foreign Trade, 1870-1955. M.I.T. Press. 1963.
- General Equilibrium of International Discrimination: The Case of Customs Unions, Harvard University Press, 1965
- Estimating foreign resource needs for economic development: theory, method, and a case study of Colombia, with Richard Bilsborrow, McGraw-Hill, 1967
- Maximal Economic Growth, 1968
- Producer Co-operatives and Labor-managed Systems, Edward Elgar, 1968
- General Theory of Labor-managed Market Economies. Ithaca, NY: Cornell University Press. 1970. Archived from the original on 2013-02-06 – via Questia.
- The Participatory Economy: An Evolutionary Hypothesis and a Strategy for Development. Cornell University Press. 1971. ISBN 978-0-8014-0639-3.
- (editor) Self-Management: Economic Liberation of Man, Penguin Books, 1975
- The Labor-Managed Economy: Essays, Cornell University Press, 1977
- Crisis and Reform: East and West, Essays in Social Economy, private publication, 1989
  in Slovak: Kríza a reforma: Východ a západ, Eseje o sociálnej ekonomike, translated by Jaroslava Perlakiová. Bratislava 1990
  in Czech: Krize a reforma: Východ a Západ, Eseje o společenské ekonomice, translated by Jan Sýkora, Prague 1990
- Unified Theory of Social Systems: A Radical Christian Analysis, Emeritus Publications, Cornell University, 2000
  available online
