= John Vernon Henderson =

Canadian-American economist and an academic

- Occupations: Economist and academic
- Awards: Fellow, John Simon Guggenheim Memorial Foundation (1984–85); Fellow, Leverhulme Foundation (2004); Fellow, Regional Science Association International (2004); Research Fellow, Center for Economic and Policy Research (2016); Fellow, the British Academy (2021)

Academic background
- Education: BA., University of British Columbia; Ph.D., University of Chicago (1972)

Academic work
- Discipline: Urban and Spatial Economics; Development Economics; Housing Economics
- Sub-discipline: Regional Specialties: Sub-Saharan Africa and East Asia with Special Reference to China, Tanzania, Kenya, and Indonesia
- Institutions: London School of Economics; Centre for Economic Policy Research

John Vernon Henderson is a Canadian-American economist and an academic. He is a Research Affiliate at the International Growth Centre, Director of the Urbanisation in Developing Countries Program, and a School Professor of Economic Geography at the London School of Economics.

Henderson is most known for his works on models of systems of cities and on urbanization in developing countries, focusing on factor market distortions, urban systems in sub-Saharan Africa, and the spatial layout of cities.

Henderson is a research fellow at the Centre for Economic Policy Research and a Fellow of the British Academy.

== Education ==
Henderson completed a BA in Economics at the University of British Columbia in 1968. In 1972, he completed a Ph.D. in Economics at the University of Chicago.

== Career ==
Henderson began his academic career in 1972 by joining Queen's University as an assistant professor of economics and served until 1974. Following this, he took on the role of visiting assistant professor of economics at the University of Chicago until 1974. From 1974 to 1979, he assumed the position of assistant professor of Economics and Urban Studies at Brown University while also serving as a visiting lecturer at Tribhuvan University in Nepal, between 1976 and 1977. In 1979, he was promoted to associate professor of Economics and Urban Studies at Brown University, a role that he served until 1982. Subsequently, from 1982 to 2013, he served as the Professor of Economics and Urban Studies at Brown University and from 1994 to 2013 as Eastman Professor of Political Economy at Brown University. During this time, he also held multiple concurrent appointments including serving as visiting scholar at the Institute of Economic Growth, Delhi University Campus in India from 1986 to 1988, a Guggenheim Fellow 1984/85, an Earhart Foundation Fellow in 1986 and Leverhulme Visiting professor of economics at the London School of Economics in 2004. Since 2013, he has held an appointment as the School Professor of Economic Geography at the London School of Economics.

As of 2014, he is the director of the Urbanisation in Developing Countries Program at the London School of Economics.

Throughout his career, Henderson has collaborated with various governments in Asia and Africa, either through direct engagements or through organizations like the World Bank or the McKinsey Global Institute, in the development of urban policies. He co-founded Urban Economics Association and served as its first president from 2006 to 2014. He also served as the past president of the North American Regional Science Association and as an editor of the Journal of Urban Economics from 2012 to 2019. Since 2016, he has been a research affiliate at the International Growth Center and a research fellow at the Center for Economic Policy Research.

== Research ==
Henderson has authored publications spanning the areas of development economics, urban economics, housing markets, and investment dynamics including articles in peer-reviewed journals.

=== Urban economics ===
Beginning with two papers in 1974, Henderson developed the framework for systems of cities, which encompasses an equilibrium model of a nation featuring trade and mobility of factors. Furthermore, he expanded this model to encompass dynamic scenarios involving capital accumulation and the emergence of endogenous technological advancements. He applied this theoretical framework to various international contexts, including nations like China, the United States, Brazil, and Korea, as well as select regions within sub-Saharan Africa. His research on urban economics has investigated factors driving urban development and growth including transportation, environment, and shared resources. His early work examined the issues of congestion and optimum city sizes, and presented staggered work hours and congestion tolls as an effective countermeasure to mitigate traffic congestion by incentivizing commuters to travel during less congested periods, thereby facilitating an optimal redistribution of traffic. In related research, he examined the impact of state policies on urban concentration and concluded that government policies attempting to reduce urban concentration by diverting people from large metropolitan areas to smaller urban centers have limited effectiveness and can lead to problems such as under-exploitation of agglomeration economies and income inequality.

Henderson's research on new urban landscapes highlighted the importance of conducting detailed assessments to evaluate the advantages and disadvantages of proximity to the city core, considering factors such as residential rents, production efficiency, local market power, commuting costs, and historical downtown capacity, in order to make well-informed decisions about business district location and capacity. He conducted research on advertising economies at a highly specific level within New York City, showing that significant external factors can have a highly localized impact, affecting areas within a range of just a few hundred meters. In 2011, he explored the relationship between migration patterns and exclusionary practices in both developed and developing countries, with a specific focus on the provision of water services to low-income migrants in Brazil. The study emphasized the harmful impact of deliberate water service restrictions on the growth and development of low-income households and communities with limited education. In 2021, his work has investigated various indicators of economic density as a means to assess the impact of urban agglomeration in six African nations and demonstrated that simple density measures outperform intricate metrics when it comes to elucidating income disparities among cities.

Focusing his research efforts on air quality regulations, Henderson investigated the influence of localized regulatory efforts on ground-level ozone pollution levels and the spatial distribution of industrial facilities, revealing that when a county shifts from meeting air quality standards to failing them, stricter regulations are implemented, leading to noticeable improvements in air quality. Moreover, he analyzed plant data from 1963 to 1992 and revealed that air quality regulation's unintended consequences on major polluters led to a 40-50% decline in expected births within polluting industries, prompting relocation of pollution-intensive operations to cleaner, less populated areas in attainment zones.

=== Development and growth economics ===
Henderson's development economics research has focused on the role of institutions, governance, human capital, and infrastructure, along with other variables relevant to economic growth and development. In his early research, he examined the timing of regional development along with the factors impacting rural-urban migration and the determinants of urban concentration in countries. His study identified a strong link between city size and education levels in developing countries, attributing it to rising skill demands and attractive urban amenities. His 2006 research investigated the impact of migration restrictions on limiting productivity in China. This study established a correlation between output per worker and the scale of the cities, revealing that a significant proportion of these cities potentially operated below their optimal size and advocated for the relaxation of intra-sector migration restrictions as a means to facilitate agglomeration and enhance productivity in China. Furthermore, his examination of local democratization and the composition of political parties within local assemblies on corruption levels in Indonesia demonstrated an overall decline in corruption levels in Indonesia between 2001 and 2004 and emphasized the importance of the presence of different political parties in local assemblies in an effort to curb corruption. In collaboration with David Weil and Adam Storeygard, he developed process for economic assessment by utilizing nightlights as a valuable alternative indicator for gauging economic advancement, especially in situations where official national statistics may be limited in accuracy or quality. He also studied the global distribution of economic activity accounting for history, geography and trade.

=== Housing markets ===
Henderson's research on the housing market has examined the impacts of various factors such as interest rates, demographics, and zoning policies. In 1983, he presented a framework for comprehending the factors that influence the decision of housing tenure and recommended that policies promoting homeownership should prioritize reducing the overall cost of owning a home, rather than solely focusing on expanding credit accessibility. His subsequent research shed light on the multifaceted factors that impact families' choices regarding the duration of residence, housing tenure, and consumption levels, revealing that renters and homeowners do not fundamentally differ in their housing preferences, but rather their decisions are shaped by their unique life circumstances. In a collaborative study with Anthony Venables and Tanner Regan, he conducted an analysis that encompassed the urban development patterns in Nairobi, examining the significance of slums within the city's growth trajectory, as well as examining the disruptions occurring within urban land markets. His most recent work in 2023 involved a project in Tanzania that encompassed the utilization of comprehensive satellite data on buildings, alongside field surveys involving real estate agents, village leaders, landowners, and residents in Dar es Salaam, Tanzania.

== Selected articles ==
- Henderson, Vernon; Kuncoro, Ari; Turner, Matt (1995). "Industrial Development in Cities". Journal of Political Economy. 103 (5): 1067–1090. doi:10.1086/262013. JSTOR 2138755.
- Henderson, Vernon (1 November 1997). "Externalities and Industrial Development". Journal of Urban Economics. 42 (3): 449–470. doi:10.1006/juec.1997.2036.
- Becker, Randy; Henderson, Vernon (2000). "Effects of Air Quality Regulations on Polluting Industries". Journal of Political Economy. 108 (2): 379–421. doi:10.1086/262123. JSTOR 10.1086/262123.
- Henderson, Vernon (March 2003). "The Urbanization Process and Economic Growth: The So-What Question". Journal of Economic Growth. 8 (1): 47–71. doi:10.1023/A:1022860800744.
- Henderson, J. Vernon; Storeygard, Adam; Weil, David N (April 2012). "Measuring Economic Growth from Outer Space". American Economic Review. 102 (2): 994–1028. Bibcode:2012AmERv.102..994H. doi:10.1257/aer.102.2.994. PMC 4108272. PMID 25067841.
- Henderson, J Vernon; Squires, Tim; Storeygard, Adam; Weil, David (February 2018). "The Global Distribution of Economic Activity: Nature, History, and the Role of Trade1". The Quarterly Journal of Economics. 133 (1): 357–406. doi:10.1093/qje/qjx030. PMC 6889963. PMID 31798191.
- Henderson, J Vernon; Regan, Tanner; Venables, Anthony J (22 May 2021). "Building the City: From Slums to a Modern Metropolis". The Review of Economic Studies. 88 (3): 1157–1192. doi:10.1093/restud/rdaa042.
