= Gregory Dow =

Gregory Keith Dow (born February 2, 1954) is an economist at Simon Fraser University who has contributed to the economics of participation and particularly to research on worker cooperatives. He received his Ph.D. from the University of Michigan in 1981 with a thesis "Investment under uncertainty : the capital market and the behavior of the firm"

He is the author of the 2003 book Governing the Firm: Workers' Control in Theory and Practice (Cambridge University Press, 2003). According to WorldCat, the book is held in 773 libraries.

His 2018 book, The Labor-Managed Firm: Theoretical Foundations attempts to build a theoretical foundation in order to explain the overwhelming preeminence of capital-managed firms viz. labor-managed firms in the real economy. His main conclusions include the fact that market imperfections along with a number of organizational weaknesses that LMFs (labor-managed firms) face that capital-managed firms (KMFs) do not prevent the spread of LMFs through the real economy.

== Bibliography ==
- Dow, Gregory K. Governing the Firm Workers' Control in Theory and Practice. Cambridge: Cambridge University Press, 2003. ISBN 9780511061394
- (coeditor) Dow, Gregory K., Andrew Eckert, and Douglas Scott West. Industrial Organization, Trade, and Social Interaction: Essays in Honour of B. Curtis Eaton. Toronto: University of Toronto Press, 2010. ISBN 9780802097026
- (coauthor), Dow, Gregory K. and Reed, Clyde G. Economic Prehistory: Six Transitions That Shaped The World. 2023.
