= Infinity Foods Workers Co-operative =

Organic food wholesale and retail workers Co-operative

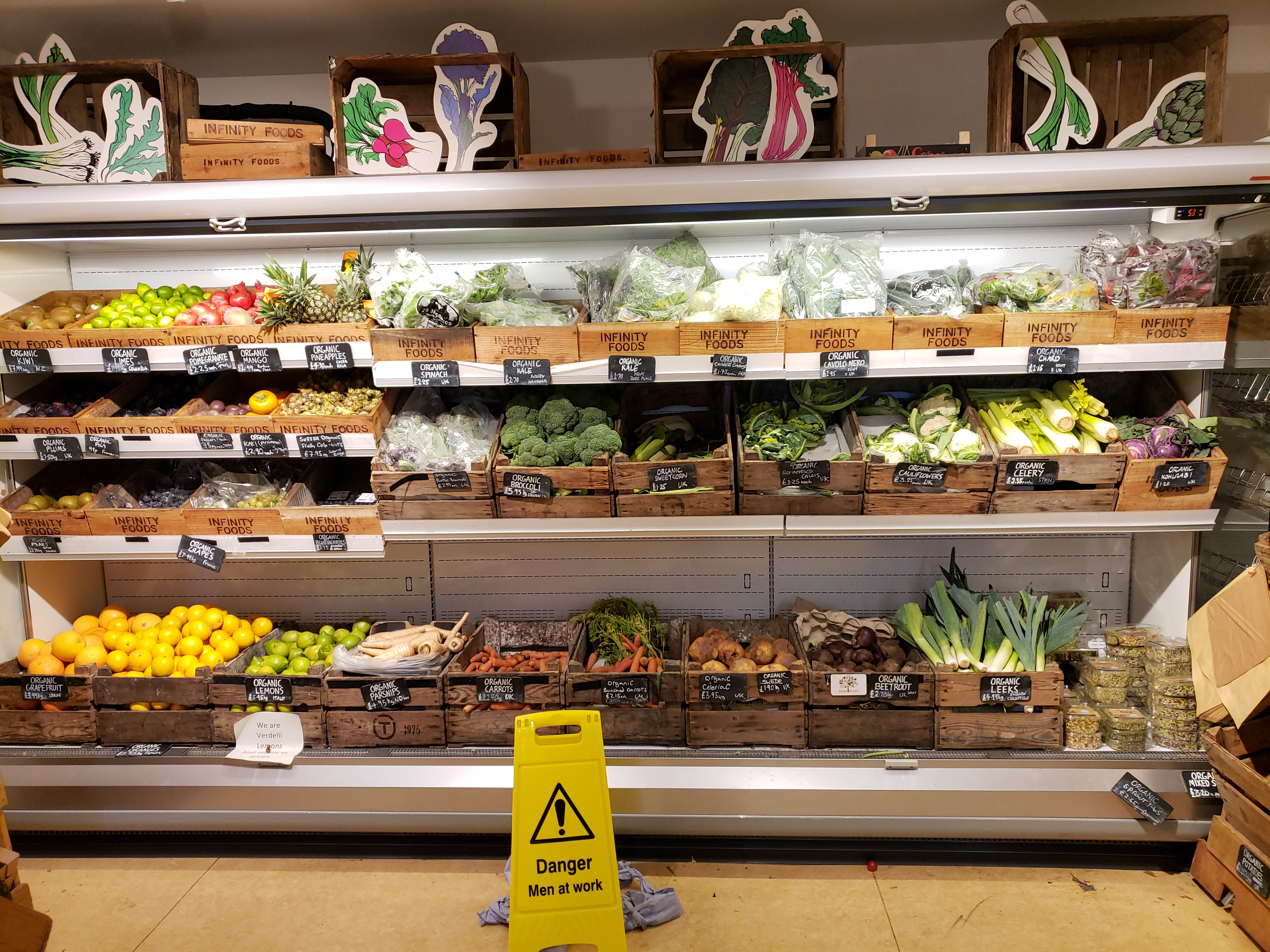
- Fruit and vegetable section, 2023
- Trade name: Infinity Foods
- Type: Worker co-operative
- Industry: Wholesaler Retailer
- Founded: 1971
- Headquarters: Brighton, East Sussex, United Kingdom
- Area served: United Kingdom
- Products: Whole food, organic food and natural products
- Website: www.infinityfoodswholesale.coop www.infinityfoodsretail.coop

Infinity Foods Workers Co-operative Ltd., is an independent wholefood business based in Brighton, specializing in vegetarian, Fairtrade, organic, ethical, and natural food and products.

== History ==
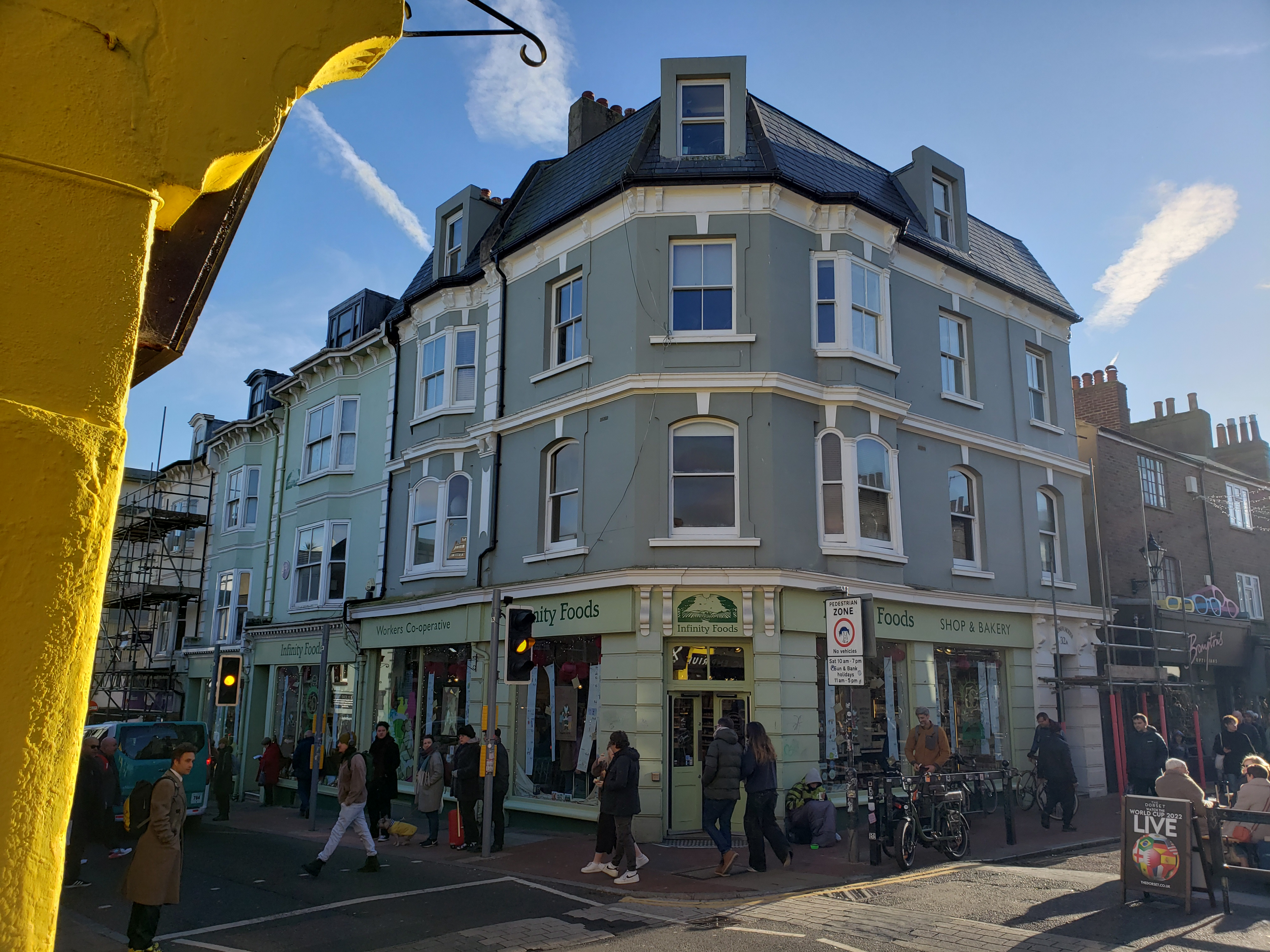
Shop on North Road, Brighton

=== 1971–1985: Origins and growth ===
In 1971, Peter Deadman, Jenny Deadman and Robin Bines, opened Infinity Foods, a small retail shop located in a converted terraced house on Church Street, Brighton. It was an alternative food retailer, selling organic and natural foods. A growing demand for organic food as a lifestyle choice was reflected the organic farming growth in the 1970s.

In 1973, the shop moved to its current site on North Road, Brighton, where it opened a wholesale operation and bakery. Infinity Foods operated informally as a worker cooperative. This is a business where the employees are the owners and collectively manage the company. They have a democratic say in decision-making and share the profits generated by the business, controlling their own workplace through shared ownership and governance.

It was formalized legally as a worker cooperative in 1979 under the regulations of the Industrial Common Ownership Movement and established as Infinity Foods Cooperative Ltd. a company owned and collectively managed by its workers.

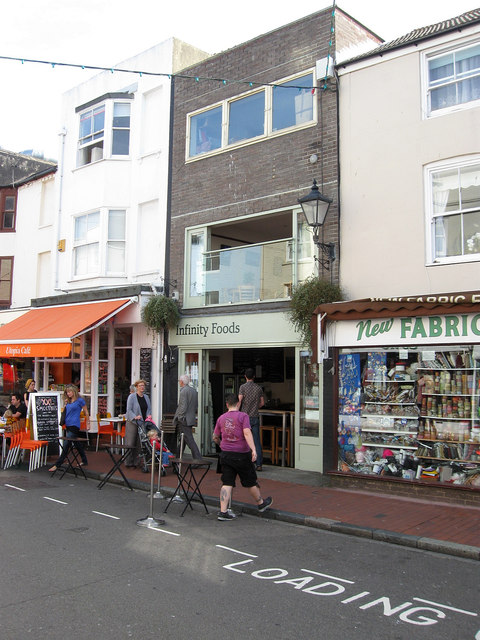
Café on Gardner Street, Brighton

In 1985, a separate wholesale division of the business, Infinity Foods Wholesale, was established and now operates from a warehouse outside of Brighton in Shoreham-by-Sea.

== Food Surplus Redistribution ==
Food surplus redistribution is an attempt to reduce food waste at source. Surpluses can arise for different reasons including food incorrectly labelled, over-ordered, over-supplied, obsolete seasonal stock and damaged packaging. Infinity Foods contributes food and goods to food distribution charities in Brighton including Brighton and Hove Food Partnership.

== Certifications ==
The Soil Association Certification. The Soil Association is the UK's largest organic certification body, offering comprehensive standards for a wide range of products including food and drink.
