= Stephen C. Smith (economist) =

American economist (born 1955)

- Born: April 24, 1955 (age 71)

Academic background
- Education: Cornell University

Academic work
- Discipline: Development economics, Poverty, Economics of participation
- School or tradition: New institutional economics
- Institutions: George Washington University
- Website: Information at IDEAS / RePEc

Stephen Charles Smith (born April 24, 1955) is an economist, author, and educator. He is Professor of Economics and International Affairs at George Washington University, where he was Chair of the Department of Economics from 2019-2025. He is also a Research Fellow of the Institute for the Study of Labor (now "IZA@LISER").

== Background ==
Smith received his PhD in economics from Cornell University in 1983 for thesis titled On Employment and Local Public Goods in Labor-Managed and Participatory Firms and Labor Unions: Institutions, Economic Theory and Econometrics. He has been a Fulbright Research Scholar and a Fulbright Senior Specialist; a UNICEF Senior Fellow; and a Jean Monnet Research Fellow at the European University Institute in Florence, Italy. Smith is also a former Visiting Fellow and Non-resident Senior Fellow of the Brookings Institution. He is a former director of the Institute for International Economic Policy, and has served as the director of The George Washington University's Research Program in Poverty, Development, and Globalization. Smith joined the faculty of The George Washington University in 1983. Smith was as an associate editor of the Journal of Economic Behavior and Organization from 2007 to 2013. He served as first director of the International Development Studies Program at the Elliott School of International Affairs at George Washington University. Smith is also a member of the Board of Directors of BRAC USA.

== Work ==
Smith is co-author with Michael Todaro of Economic Development (13th edition, Pearson Education, 2020). He is the author of Ending Global Poverty: A Guide to What Works (Palgrave Macmillan, hardcover 2005, paperback with afterword 2009). He is also co-editor with Jennifer Brinkerhoff and Hildy Teegen of NGOs and the Millennium Development Goals: Citizen Action to Reduce Poverty (Palgrave Macmillan, June 2007). Smith is the author of other publications including approximately three dozen journal articles.

Stephen Smith teaches courses in development economics. He has been a consultant for the World Bank, the International Labour Office (ILO, Geneva), the World Institute for Development Economics Research (UN-WIDER, Helsinki), and the United Nations Development Programme. Smith has done on-site research and program work in several regions of the developing world including Bangladesh, China, Ecuador, India, Uganda, and the Former Yugoslavia.

== Contributions ==
=== Poverty ===
Smith focuses on extreme poverty, or ultra-poverty. Smith's Ending Global Poverty has a local program and microeconomic focus, in contrast to more macro approaches of Jeffrey Sachs' The End of Poverty, Bill Easterly's White Man's Burden and Paul Collier's Bottom Billion. Smith describes 16 poverty traps, most operating at local levels, and considers solutions. Some of his recent work addresses programs to assist women smallholder farmers and problems of adaptation to climate change in low income countries,.

=== Economic development ===
Smith is co-author of Economic Development, the leading text in that field, now in its 13th edition. It begins with comprehensive treatments of institutions, comparative development, and traditional and new theories of development. It examines in-depth development policymaking and roles of market, state, and civil society. The text examines key topics of poverty and inequality, population growth causes and consequences, urbanization and rural-urban migration; education and health in development; agricultural transformation and rural development; environment and development; international trade and development strategy; balance of payments, debt, financial crises, and stabilization policies; foreign finance, investment, and aid; and finance and fiscal policy for development.

=== Participation ===
In addition to his work on poverty and development economics, Smith has conducted research on the economics of participation, including works councils, employee stock ownership plan, and worker cooperatives, including research in Italy, Spain, Germany, China, and India. On worker cooperatives, Smith investigated worker coop coexistence with conventional firms; he found evidence from Italy consistent with the hypothesis that coops compete using small innovations contributed by workers and or specializing within sectors in artisan-quality products. He conducted an empirical test of the "Ward effect" theory in which worker coops would reduce output when its market price rose; Smith's findings cast doubt on this claim, and his results implied that worker coops place positive weight on members' employment when making production decisions. Smith interpreted clustering patterns of worker coops as helping explain their rarity: Formal and informal coop leagues provide scale economies that help make coops viable; but as leagues need coops to start them the result is a "chicken and egg problem." Smith also introduced market failure rationales for works council and co-determination legislation.
