= CICOPA =

- Company type: Cooperative, international organisation
- Founded: 1947
- Headquarters: Brussels, Belgium
- Key people: Iñigo Albizuri Landazabal (President); Diana Dovgan (General Secretary)
- Parent: International Cooperative Alliance
- Website: cicopa.coop

CICOPA (International Organisation of Cooperatives in Industry and Services) is a branch of the International Cooperative Alliance. Founded in 1947, CICOPA has a membership of 46 national and regional cooperative federations or support organizations. CICOPA is active in 30 countries, promoting worker cooperatives, social cooperatives and producers' cooperatives in industry and services.

CICOPA has two regional organisations: CECOP (CICOPA Europe) and CICOPA Americas. CICOPA Americas includes two sub-regional organisations; CICOPA North America and CICOPA Mercosur.

The 2003 CICOPA General Assembly held in Oslo, Norway approved in principle the World Declaration on Cooperative Worker Ownership. The final draft was approved by the CICOPA Executive Committee on 17 February 2004. The Declaration was then approved by the ICA General Assembly in Cartagena, Colombia, in 2005. CICOPA organised a two-year consultation process with its members in order to develop a common concept concerning social cooperatives typologies. The World Standards of Social Cooperatives are the outcome of this process. They were approved in their substance at the CICOPA General Assembly held in Geneva on 18 November 2009 and in their final form at the CICOPA General Assembly held in Cancun, Mexico, on 16 November 2011.
