= David Ellerman =

American philosopher and author

David Patterson Ellerman (born 14 March 1943) is a philosopher and author who works in the fields of economics and political economy, social theory and philosophy, quantum mechanics, and in mathematics. He has written extensively on workplace democracy based on a modern treatment of the labor theory of property and the theory of inalienable rights as rights based on de facto inalienable capacities.

== Education ==
Ellerman was born 14 March 1943 in Fayette, Missouri.

He received an undergraduate degree in philosophy from Massachusetts Institute of Technology in 1965. He went on to Boston University for his graduate work, receiving an MA in philosophy of science in 1967, an MA in economics in 1968, and a doctorate in mathematics in 1972. His PhD thesis was titled Sheaves Of Relational Structures And Ultraproducts, and was advised by Rohit Jivanlal Parikh.

== Career ==
After his PhD, Ellerman remained teaching at Boston University in the mathematics and then the economic department until 1976. He then taught economics at the University of Massachusetts, Boston until 1982, then at Boston College until 1987, and finally at Tufts University until 1990. In 1990, he moved to Ljubljana, Slovenia, where he started a labor consulting firm. From 1992 until 2003, he worked at the World Bank as an economics advisor to the Chief Economist (Joseph Stiglitz and Nicholas Stern). From 2003 to 2020, he was a visiting scholar at the University of California, Riverside and since 2020, he is an associate researcher at the University of Ljubljana.

== Books ==
- Partitions, Objective Indefiniteness, and Quantum Reality. SpringerNature 2024. ISBN 9783031617867.
- The Logic of Partitions: With Two Major Applications, Logic Studies 101. College Publications, 2023 ISBN 9781848904408.
- New Foundations for Information Theory: Logical Entropy and Shannon Entropy. SpringerNature, 2021. ISBN 9783030865528.
- Putting Jurisprudence Back into Economics: What is Really Wrong in Today's Neoclassical Theory. SpringerNature, 2021. ISBN 9783030760960.
- Neo-Abolitionism: Abolishing Human Rentals in Favor of Workplace Democracy. SpringerNature, 2021. ISBN 9783030626761.
- The Uses of Diversity: Essays in Polycentricity. Rowman & Littlefield, 2020. ISBN 1793623732.
- Helping People Help Themselves: From the World Bank to an Alternative Philosophy of Development Assistance. University of Michigan Press, 2005. ISBN 0472021761.
- Intellectual Trespassing as a Way of Life: Essays in Philosophy, Economics, and Mathematics. Lanham, MD: Rowman & Littlefield, 1995. ISBN 0847679322.
- Property and Contract in Economics: The Case for Economic Democracy. Cambridge MA: Basil Blackwell, 1992. ISBN 1557863091.
- The Democratic Worker-Owned Firm. London: Unwin Hyman Limited (HarperCollins Academic), 1990. ISBN 9780044457435; 2016 reprint ISBN 1138892653.
- Economics, Accounting, and Property Theory. Lexington MA: Lexington Books, 1982. ISBN 0669055522.
