= Journal of Comparative Economics =

- Discipline: Comparative economics
- Language: English
- Edited by: R. Enikolopov, T. Kuran, H. Li

Publication details
- History: 1977-present
- Publisher: Elsevier on behalf of the Association for Comparative Economic Studies
- Frequency: Quarterly
- Impact factor: 2.7 (2022)

Standard abbreviations
- ISO 4: J. Comp. Econ.

Indexing
- ISSN: 0147-5967
- OCLC no.: 311096077

Links
- Journal homepage; Online access

The Journal of Comparative Economics is a quarterly peer-reviewed academic journal published by Elsevier on behalf of the Association for Comparative Economic Studies. It was established in 1977 and the editors-in-chief are Ruben Enikolopov (Pompeu Fabra University), Timur Kuran (Duke University), and Hongbin Li (Stanford University).
