= James Meade =

British economist and Nobel Laureate (1907–1995)

James Meade FBA
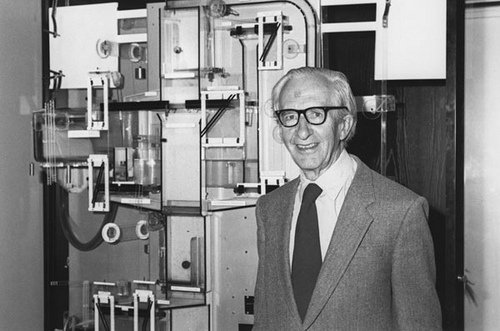
- Meade in front of a Phillips Machine/MONIAC computer
- Born: James Edward Meade; 23 June 1907; Swanage, England
- Died: 22 December 1995 (aged 88); Cambridge, England

Academic background
- Education: Oriel College, Oxford

Academic work
- Discipline: Economics; Welfare economics
- School or tradition: Neo-Keynesian economics
- Institutions: University of Cambridge (1957–68); London School of Economics (1947–57)
- Notable ideas: Keynesian multiplier
- Awards: Nobel Memorial Prize in Economic Sciences (1977)

James Edward Meade (23 June 1907 – 22 December 1995) was a British economist who made major contributions to the theory of international trade and welfare economics. Along with Richard Kahn, James Meade helped develop the concept of the Keynesian multiplier while participating in the Cambridge circus. In the 1930s, he served as specialist adviser on behalf of the British government at the Economic and Financial Organization of the League of Nations.

== Biography ==
Born in Swanage, Meade was brought up in Bath, and educated at Lambrook prep school, Malvern College, and Oriel College, Oxford, where he initially read classics, before switching (in 1928) to the newly-established course in philosophy, politics, and economics. He was elected a Fellow of Hertford College, Oxford in 1930, and was a lecturer in economics at Oxford from 1931 to 1937. During the Second World War, he was recalled to the Economic Section of the Secretariat of the War Cabinet, which he chaired from 1946 to 1947.

He was appointed CB in 1946, and served as President of the Royal Economic Society from 1964 to 1966. While his work was not confined by political boundaries, he advised the Labour Party in the 1930s, and was a member of the Social Democratic Party during the 1980s. He once said that he had "my heart to the left, and my brain to the right".

In 1976 he received an Honorary Doctorate from the University of Bath.

Along with the Swedish economist Bertil Ohlin, he received the Nobel Memorial Prize in Economic Sciences in 1977 "for their pathbreaking contribution to the theory of international trade and international capital movements".

In 1981 he attracted attention as one of the 364 economists who signed a letter to The Times questioning Margaret Thatcher's economic policies, warning that it would only result in deepening the prevailing depression.
