= Maria Martin (disambiguation) =

Maria Martin (1796–1863) was an American painter.

Maria Martin may also refer to:

- María Martín (actress) (1923–2014), Spanish actress
- María Martín (gymnast) (born 1970), Spanish gymnast
- Maria Martin (journalist) (1951–2023), Mexican-American journalist
- María Martín (politician) (1973–2002), Spanish politician
- Marialejandra Martín (born 1964), Venezuelan actress
- Dutch wife née Maria Boeke (1915-2017) of Swiss musician Frank Martin
- Maria Clementine Martin (1775–1843), German businesswoman
- Maria Paz Martin Esteban (born 1960), Spanish botanist
- María Ángeles Martín Prats (born 1971), Spanish engineer and entrepreneur
- María Martín-Granizo (born 2006), Spanish para-alpine skier

== See also ==
- Maria Marten (disambiguation)
- Maria Martins (disambiguation)
- Mary Martin (Broadway star) and others
