= José María Arizmendiarrieta =

Spanish Catholic priest and Mondragón cooperative movement founder (1915–1976)

Venerable José María Arizmendiarrieta
- Born: 22 April 1915; Markina-Xemein, Biscay, Spain
- Died: 29 November 1976 (aged 61); Mondragón, Gipuzkoa, Spain
- Occupations: Catholic priest; educator; journalist

José María Arizmendiarrieta Madariaga (22 April 1915 – 29 November 1976) was a Spanish Catholic priest and promoter of the cooperative companies of the Mondragon Corporation, originally located in the Basque Country and currently spread throughout the world. As of 2021, it is the second largest social economy business group in Spain, bringing together ninety-eight cooperatives, eight foundations, one mutual, ten coverage entities and seven international delegations, distributed in four areas: finance, industry, distribution and knowledge.

Arizmendiarrieta was a seminarian in Vitoria when the Spanish Civil War began in 1936, and consequently he was mobilized by the Basque Government. Due to his knowledge of the Basque language, he was assigned to the editor of the new newspaper Eguna, where he remained until Francisco Franco’s troops entered Bilbao. He was arrested by them, and again mobilized for the Military Government of Burgos until the end of the war. After finishing his studies and his priestly ordination, he was assigned in 1941 as curate of the parish to the industrial town of Mondragon, located in the Gipuzkoan Deba Valley, where he remained until his death.

A pragmatic and hard-working priest, with a great sense of social justice and human dignity, he promoted numerous entities and companies for the good of the workers and the community in what he called the "cooperative experience of Mondragon". Thousands of people visit Mondragon every year to analyze Arizmendiarrieta's self-managed cooperative model for job creation and maintenance. He is considered venerable in the Catholic Church.

== Biography ==
=== Early years: 1915–1931 ===
Jose Maria Arizmendiarrieta, whose name is often shortened to "Arizmendi", was born on April 22, 1915 in the modest farmhouse called Iturbe, nestled in the Barinaga porch, in the municipality of Markina-Xemein, Biscay. His parents were José Luis and Tomasa. His father had a reputation as a man of peace among his neighbors. Good-natured, cheerful and determined, he had a social life under the wing of friars and brotherhoods. His mother was a housewife in the spirit of biblical womanhood: intelligent, orderly, hard-working and self-sacrificing. She took care of the children's education and the administration of the farmhouse.

Jose Maria was the eldest of four children, the other three being Maria, Francisco and Jesus. When he was three years old he suffered a fall in front of the farmhouse, causing a severe head injury, and was taken to the doctor at Markina. The physical damage to his visual perception was irreparable: he lost his left eye, which was replaced by an artificial one. At the age of four he began to go to the rural school attached to the parish, financed by the farmhouses and the neighbourhood residents. The aftermath of the accident influenced José María's future temperament, as well as the over-protection that his mother devoted to him from then on.

Given his visual impairment and his family upbringing, instead of playing and misbehaving like other children, his character was not very expansive: shy, quiet, and observant. Jose Maria was an intelligent child with little physical strength. The boy consequently began to adopt an austere, modest and practical character, close to his pragmatic mother, who, despite being illiterate, appreciated his penchant for reading and literature, and encouraged him, when he turned twelve, to go to the Minor seminary of Castillo Elejabeitia. There he started wearing the glasses that hid his handicap, and his priestly vocation was strengthened. In the seminary he discovered a new world, but he remained faithful to his origins, to the peasant land in which he had grown up and where he learned from his mother the value of practical work for subsistence in a modest farmhouse. He had come from a monolingual environment based on the use of the Basque language in all social spheres, but in the seminary he studied above all general culture in the two permitted languages, Spanish and Latin. Four years later, he joined the recently inaugurated Diocesan seminary of Vitoria.

=== Seminary of Vitoria: 1931–1936 ===
Arizmendiarrieta was at the seminary at the time of the Second Spanish Republic, precisely when social issues re-emerged. The seminarians, in addition to studying philosophy and theology, studied the social encyclical Quadragessimo Anno by Pius XI. Consequently, he delved into the spirituality of the Priestly Movement of Vitoria, having Joaquin Goikoetxeandia and Juan Thalamas as special tutors. And he assumed the motto of the first: "Be a priest, always and in everything a priest." Great importance was attached to values such as bodily austerity, punctuality, silence, industriousness, hygiene and presentation.

In the seminary there were two groups, the youngest and most unreflective, who played football and Basque pelota, and the mature, serious and responsible group who thought about the problems of the world, about peace and war, or social issues such as hunger and missions. Arizmendiarrieta belonged to the latter. One of the most influential priests was Manuel Lekuona, a professor of languages and art. He defended the view that working for the cultivation of the Basque language was an urgent duty of the diocesan priests, to teach catechesis in the vernacular language. In fact, in 1933 several students in the 2nd year of philosophy decided to found the "Third level of the Kardaberaz Society" (Kardaberaz Bazkunaren hirugarren maila), and they endowed it with the motto "Always forward" (Aurrera beti). They all agreed that the best person to draft its statutes was Arizmendiarrieta, who also drew up his founding manifesto, in which he associated the work of the company with the Renaissance ideology. Likewise, he was appointed deputy director of the Society, that is, the de facto manager, since the Director, known as Lekuona, merely supervised. They held an average of three meetings per month, to which were added ordinary and extraordinary meetings.

Both Lekuona and Jose Miguel Barandiaran conveyed to the seminarians the value of critical observation, being reluctant to promote mere study. In this way they countered the monastic romanticism of the seminary, which tended to cloister the priestly vocation, such that according to Arizmendiarrieta, "from so much talking about the temptations of the world, they were absent and unaware of the real temptations: power and comfort."

=== Civil War and priestly ordination: 1936–1941 ===
At the beginning of the civil war in July 1936, Arizmendiarrieta was in the family farmhouse of Barinaga enjoying his annual vacation from the seminary, and he remained there until he was mobilized by the new Basque Government of José Antonio Aguirre. But the military medical court certified his incapacity for active military service, and assigned him to an auxiliary corps, specifically to the editorial office of the newspaper Eguna (The Day), where he received a monthly salary as a soldier. The newspaper in Basque had been created in January 1937 by the new government to communicate with the Basque-speaking population, and especially with the soldiers at the front. He was a member of the Bilbao Press Association, and in May and June he also wrote in the bilingual newspaper Gudari (Soldier), aimed directly at the Basque militia battalions. In his articles, the anti-fascist, nationalist and Christian-Democratic ideology of Eguna was maintained. With Arizmendiarrieta worked several comrades from the group “Always forward" of the Vitoria seminary, such as Eusebio Erkiaga and Alejandro Mendizabal. The treatment of information sought to defend the Basque homeland and its most important components, language and religion. All this from a Christian-Democratic political orientation, with insistent references to social justice.

In June 1937, the rebel troops invaded Bilbao, and Arizmendiarrieta tried to flee to France. But fearful that they would take reprisals against his family, he returned to Barinaga and was later arrested due to a complaint. He spent a month in jail accused of writing in Eguna and Gudari, and after a summary court-martial against 17 detainees, only 4 were saved from being shot, including Arizmendiarrieta, who declared that he was a soldier and not a journalist. He was finally released without charge, and mobilized by the Francoist army, being posted to the Burgos artillery regiment. He got permission to continue studying theology at the seminary in that city, passing and moving on to a new course. At the end of the year, the Bergara seminary was opened, and Arizmendiarrieta moved there to continue his priestly studies. In September 1939, he returned again to the Vitoria seminary, under the tutelage of professor Rufino Aldabalde, who had created some work groups where he considered that, after the upheaval of the civil war, the social question was the burning task for the new generation of priests. The stages of "Kardaberaz" and the work in "Eguna" had finished, and in December Arizmendiarrieta was appointed by Aldabalde director of the group's sheet, which was called "Pax". In March 1940, the sheet changed its name to "Arises", and the Priestly Movement of Vitoria was created, where the social apostolate, especially that of youth and workers, were the two areas of work in which Arizmendiarrieta participated in the months prior to his ordination. On January 1, 1941, he celebrated his first mass in the church of San Pedro de Barinaga in the presence of his parents and relatives. A Lorenzo Perosi mass was sung at the ceremony, as well as the Nun duzu amandrea (Where do you have your grandmother) by Resurrección María de Azkue the admired president of Euskaltzaindia (Royal Academy of the Basque Language). He intended to study sociology at the University of Leuven in Belgium, but was assigned as an assistant Curate to the parish Mondragon, 30 miles from his own home town, which suffered from unusual levels of unemployment and social tensions as a result of the civil war.

=== Assigned to Mondragon: 1941–1954 ===
He arrived in Arrasate (in Spanish, Mondragon) in February 1941, as a 26-year-old newly ordained priest. There, since the Middle Ages, iron was worked in its forges and craft workshops. And at the beginning of the 20th century it had an efficient manufacturing, dedicating the companies to the production of laminates, profiles and sheet metal, screws, locksmiths, hardware, metal furniture, malleable iron, home appliances, iron pipe accessories and office furniture. Upon his arrival, these companies employed 1,500 workers, out of a population of 8,800 inhabitants.

The most important company was the Locksmith Union with 800 employees. It was publicly listed and had a commissary for its employees and its own School of Apprentices, where Arizmendiarrieta began to teach a social training class for one hour a week, as chaplain of the San Juan Bautista parish. This relationship with young apprentices led him to revitalize Catholic Action as a center for social, cultural and religious leisure. In addition, he created in 1942 new sections such as the Sports Youth, the Academy of Sociology, and the Hallelujah magazine, intended for new military recruits. In his quest for community welfare, he started to focus his efforts on vocational training, such as the school provided by the Locksmith Union, a flagship factory of Mondragon. However, his attempts to enhance and expand the school were not welcomed by the management. And Arizmendiarrieta wanted to socialize knowledge and extend the possibility of training to the children of all the workers of the town. He visited the Professional School opened in Vitoria by Pedro Anitua, and decided to do the same, creating a Professional School in precarious conditions in 1943, in the name of Catholic Action, for which he relied on donations and popular subscription. It was a private, non-cooperative school, initially governed by a Board of Trustees. During the eleven months of the course, the students had a paid job for four hours in the morning in a local company, and in the afternoon they went to class for six hours.

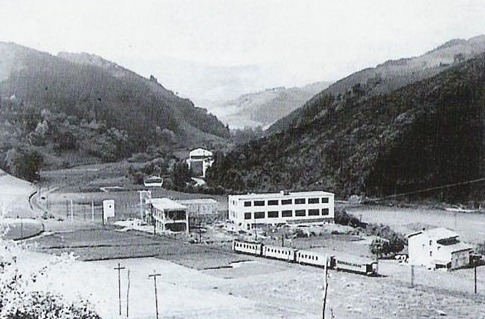
ULGOR, the first industrial cooperative, in 1956.

In 1945, at the initiative of Arizmendiarrieta and through Sports Youth, the Iturripe stadium was built, financed with contributions from businesses and the local community through pools, raffles, passes for shows, etc. And continuing with his procedure of institutionalizing social projects, he himself drafted its statutes, turning it into a municipal sports society with a Delegated Board that included the main public, ecclesiastical and economic authorities of Mondragon.

In the year 1946, Arizmendiarrieta made an important qualitative leap in training, by selecting the best eleven young people who had completed their High Level Vocational Cycle studies, to pursue higher studies in Industrial engineering, but enrolled in the University of Zaragoza, located 200 km away. During the day they worked 55 hours a week at the Locksmith Union, and at night they studied under the guidance of teachers from the Professional School. They were examined in person in July, and all passed the five courses. Among them were the five entrepreneurs of what in 1956 was the first cooperative, ULGOR. In addition, the same year and following his thought of "theology of reality", he managed to create an anti-tuberculosis dispensary in the small Mondragon Community health center.

The year 1947 and the following years were socially convulsive, with wage claims from the workers in several companies, with the support and participation of Arizmendiarrieta in the preparation of the writings, as works of social apostolate. All this while maintaining his good relationship with the businessmen, who supported him in the creation of the League of Education and Culture foundation for the promotion of the common good. But over time, clashes arose between the paternalistic leadership of the Locksmith Union and the engineering students.

In 1952 the new Zaldispe Professional School promoted by Arizmendiarrieta was inaugurated. He humbly confined himself to the audience, while the Education minister, the Civil Governor, the Bishop, the President of the Provincial Council and other authorities were on the platform. In the same act, the first class of Industrial Engineers received their titles from Minister Joaquín Ruiz Jiménez. Within its social projects, in August 1953 the first stone of the new housing complex for workers in the Makatzena neighborhood was laid, after creating the charitable construction entity "Mondragon Home Association". Arizmendiarrieta put his working-class ideology into practice through an austere life: without salaries, traveling by train with a third-class ticket or in friends' cars, and moving around Mondragon with his modest bicycle, as the working class did.

=== Illness and death: 1963–1976 ===
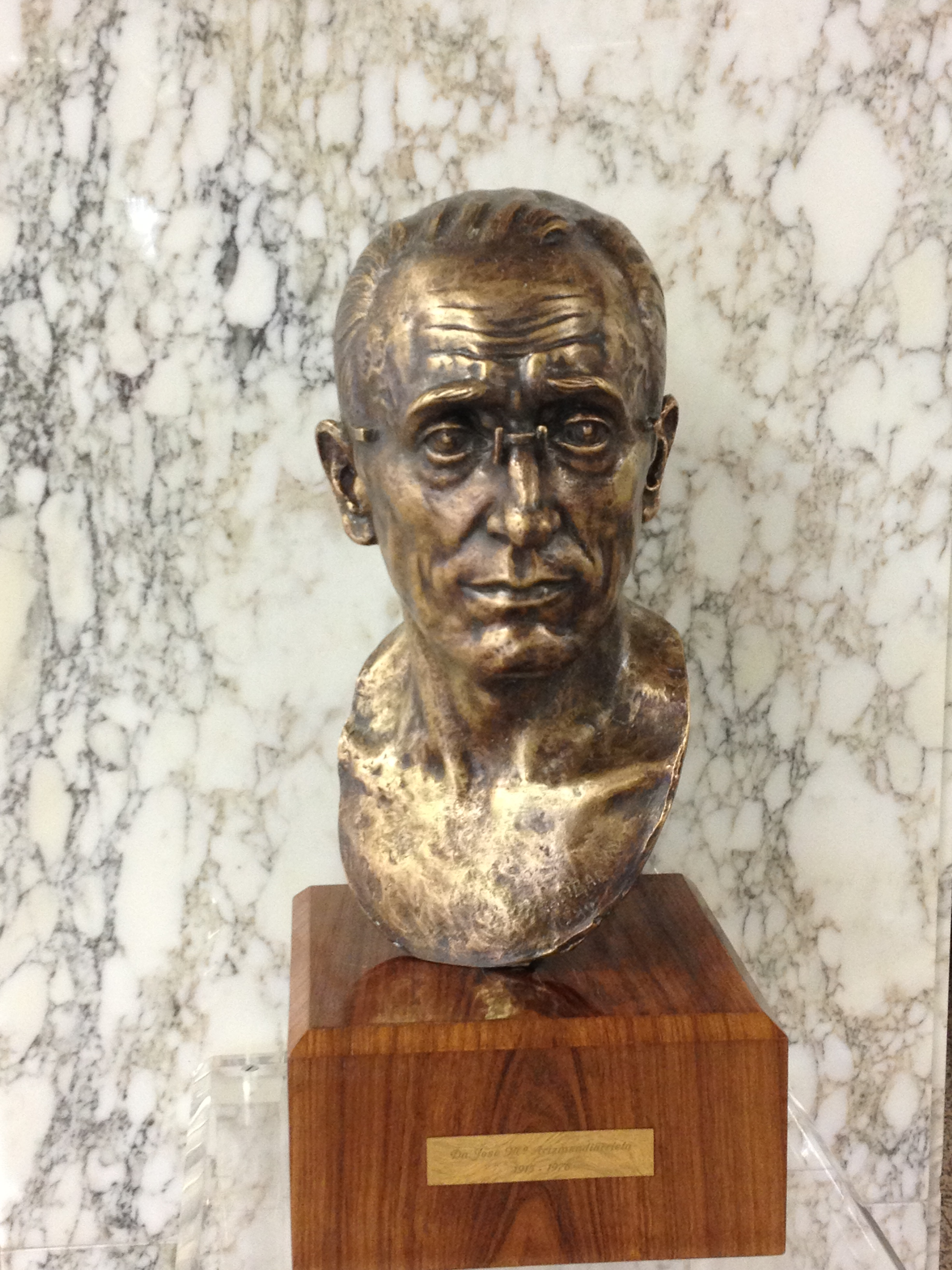
Bust of Arizmendiarrieta in the headquarters of the Laboral Kutxa.

In 1963 he began to suffer health problems, surely the result of his intense activity in the previous years: priestly life, classes, talks, conferences, meetings, visits to work centers, attention to people in his office at the School, trips to the ministries and official entities, trips abroad, and his inveterate dedication to training through extensive study. He did not fully recover, and in February 1967 he suffered a heart embolism, for which he underwent surgery in Madrid where an artificial prosthesis was placed in his heart.

After several years of normal life, in January 1973 he was hospitalized for heart problems in Bilbao, where a strict recovery regimen was imposed, and after it he came back to Mondragon in a state of some weakness. His condition was, however, irreversible and in February 1974 he had to go back to the hospital to undergo another operation, given that the previously placed artificial valve had become denatured over time and needed to be replaced. The complex operation went well, but over the following days, Arizmendiarrieta suffered as the wounds became infected and did not heal: it was the so-called "sickness of the operating room". In April, he was discharged to return to Mondragon, where his wounds were treated daily. Only his priestly asceticism explains the silence with which he experienced the physical suffering that accompanied him after this last operation. Cures and medications, especially antibiotics, constituted a painful martyrdom that he endured with resignation, while, still weak, he tried to lead a normal life. After several further hospitalizations and discharges, at the beginning of November 1976 he was admitted to the Mondragon Health Center, where the doctors decided against continued treatment of his wounds, to spare him any further suffering. His death came on November 29.

His body was able to be viewed for two days, and thousands of people paid homage to him. On December 1, the funeral was held, presided over by the minister of labour and officiated by 60 priests.

== Cooperative enterprises: 1955–1976 ==
Until 1955 Arizmendiarrieta developed his work in four different areas, and in all cases with inter-class cooperation criteria:

- Parish church, which included the Catholic Action Center and the Spiritual Exercises Work,
- Social, with social health assistance works through anti-tuberculosis and children's clinics, or housing construction through the Mondragon Home Association,
- Formative, represented by the Professional School, and
- Recreational, oriented towards sport and cinema with the Sports Youth.

The business area was pending, with the participation of workers in the capital and management of companies. After thirteen years of creative work in the assistance and training sectors, based more on action than on reflection, and nourished by the social doctrine of the church, Arizmendiarrieta focused his dedication on the creation of social enterprises, which he called the "cooperative experience".

=== Organizational model ===
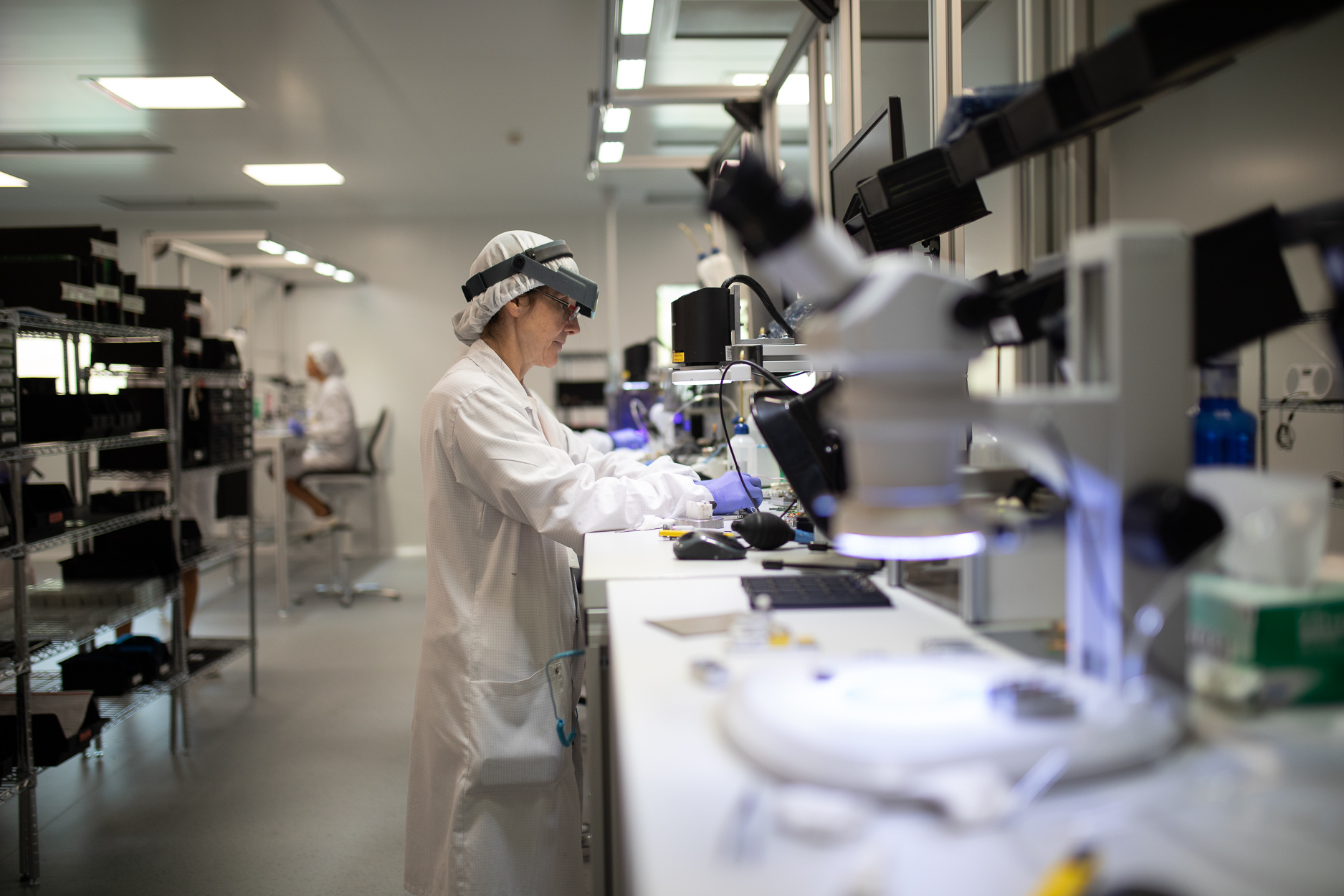
A female member of the Fagor Cooperative Group in the laboratory.

Arizmendiarrieta promoted an open organizational model without distinction of race, belief, social class or sex, which was both participatory and interdependent. And it had some common elements, but also others specific to each sector of activity.

Among the common elements was the General assembly of partners, where the democracy of one person/one vote prevailed, without assessing seniority or the capital owned by the partner. The Assembly elected the members of the Governing Council, equivalent to the Board of Administration, where any member could present their candidacy. The Governing Council elected the managing director, who in turn would elect his own management team. On the other hand, the workers elected the members of the Social Council, equivalent to the workers unions, in a proportion of one representative for every twenty members. Both the Governing Council and the Social Council internally elected their president.

Depending on the sector, the composition of the partners changed. Thus, in industrial cooperatives only their workers were members. In credit and research cooperatives, workers and companies were partners. In the consumer cooperatives, the workers and the companies were partners, and the clients were user partners. And in the training cooperatives the workers, the companies, and the students were partners. All the cooperatives were private, self-managed and offering their services to the entire marketplace. On the other hand, both research and training cooperatives were non-profit.

=== Consumer cooperatives ===
In July 1955 the houses of the "Mondragon Home Association" had already been completed, and Arizmendiarrieta promoted the creation of the San José Consumer Cooperative among his neighbors in the assembly of partners. It was about creating a community alternative to the exclusive company stores, such as that of the Locksmith Union. He organized everything personally: he participated in the list of founding members, collected the necessary documentation to formalize the statutes, looked for theoretical references about cooperativism to familiarize the members with this business model, took care of the steps to acquire premises in the town that served as a store, and drafted the statutes of the company. They included him as a member of the Governing Board, and to finance his purchase, Arizmendiarrieta negotiated interest-free loans with several companies in exchange for them taking advantage of the cooperative as their own commissary.

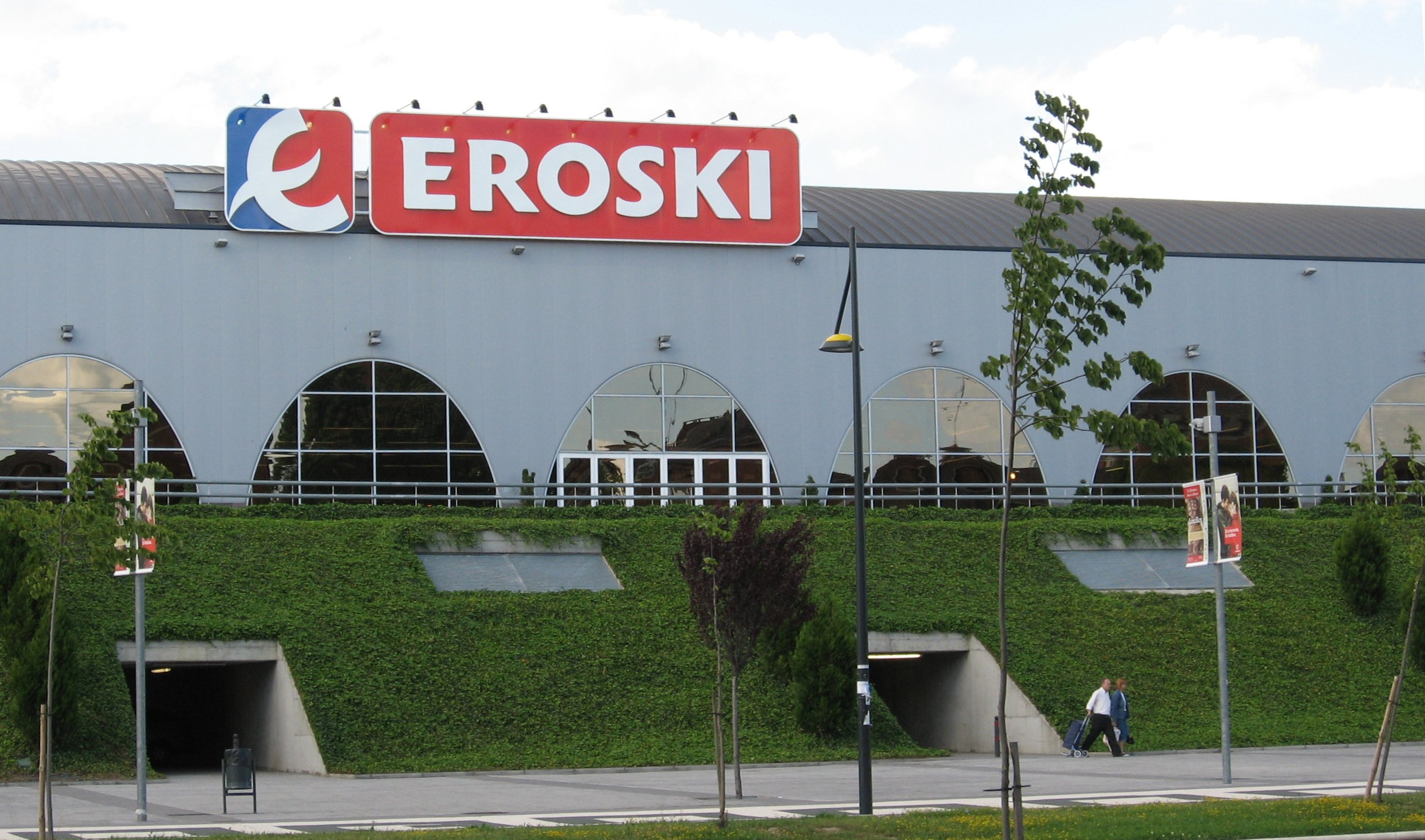
A supermarket of the Eroski cooperative in Vitoria-Gasteiz.

The San Jose Consumer Cooperative also served as a work balance by employing mostly women, since Arizmendiarrieta devoted special attention to promoting women. To do this, he expanded a teaching section in the Professional School, focused on the 400 single female workers who existed in Mondragon. Over the years, more consumer cooperatives were created, and in September 1969, as a result of the merger of the San Jose Cooperative, with several cooperatives based in the towns of Arechavaleta, Amorebieta, Marquina, Guernica, Éibar, Ermua, Matiena and Recaldeberri (Bilbo), the new company Eroski Group was created.

=== Industrial cooperatives ===
At the beginning of 1955, Arizmendiarrieta desisted from making any more attempts to promote worker participation in the capital and management of the Locksmith Union. He encouraged five of his closest collaborators to create a new company, ULGOR (name derived from the initials of the five founders: Luis Usatorre, Jesus Larrañaga, Alfonso Gorroñogoitia, Jose Maria Ormaetxea and Javier Ortubay). The authorization for its creation had to be given by the Government in Madrid, and when this was refused, they decided to buy a company in difficulty in Vitoria in October, with its industrial license to manufacture "appliances for domestic use", essentially cooking oil stoves.

In April 1956 Arizmendiarrieta blessed the pavilion where the new company Talleres ULGOR was located in Mondragon, where in addition to continuing to manufacture the previous stoves, they launched a new product: an oil stove copied to the millimeter from an English model unknown in Spain. Likewise, in the summer they obtained a license to manufacture selenium plates under the patent of a German company.

Arizmendiarrieta relied on talented young people he knew from the School, under the premise that "to create cooperatives you have to train cooperative members". On the other hand, the new businesses were promoted with a double logic: that they did not previously exist in the Alto Deba Valley, to avoid entering into competition with them, and that they were linked to their professional knowledge acquired in the Locksmith Union and the Professional School. Thus, Usatorre and Larrañaga took charge of the electrical appliances, Ormaetxea of the foundry, and Gorroñogoitia of the electronics. In August they took advantage of the summer holidays to move the machinery and dies from the Vitoria plant to Mondragon, and in November the workshop was officially opened.

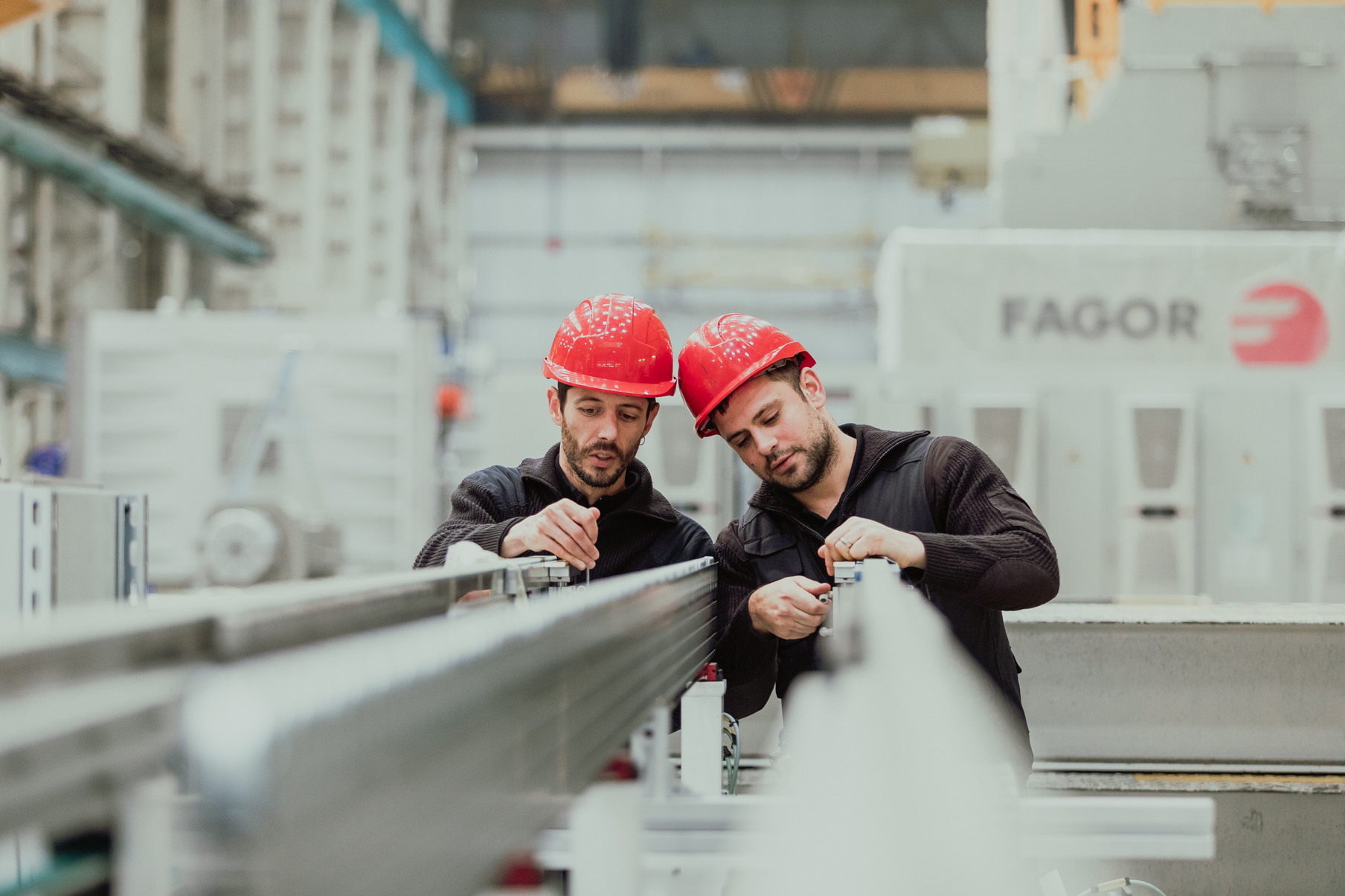
Two members working in the workshop.

In 1957, after the good start represented by ULGOR, Arizmendiarrieta, with the participation of former students of the Professional School, promoted the creation in Mondragon of Talleres Arrasate Industrial Cooperative to revive the company Aranzabal Workshop, which was in bankruptcy. The statutes were drawn up by himself in collaboration with two lawyers from Madrid, one of whom was responsible for the National Union of Industrial Cooperatives. The object of the new cooperative company was "the manufacture and sale of machines, tools, punching and tooling".

=== Credit unions ===
In August 1958, Arizmendiarrieta went on an excursion of students and professors from the Polytechnic School to the World Exhibition in Brussels, and took advantage of his first trip abroad to visit different automobile, household appliance and machine tool companies in France, Holland, Belgium and Germany. After the trip, he decided to implement an idea that had been maturing in recent years, the creation of cooperative credit entities. At the beginning of 1959, he drafted two preliminary projects which would materialize in the creation of a financial entity and another assistance entity.

==== Financial entity ====
The objective of the "Labour Bank" (Laboral Kutxa, a credit cooperative financial entity) was to cover the industrial and service cooperatives in their investments and growth, and in turn, channel their profits and the savings of their members. The first office was opened in October 1959, and in addition to its financial function, it activated the Social Welfare service to cover the 314 members of ULGOR and the other industrial cooperative "Talleres Arrasate".

In the statutes that he presented for the approval of the Labour Bank, he reinforced mutual cooperation by proposing that the existing cooperatives be members of the credit cooperative and that the new cooperatives be incorporated as members. In this way, they mutually reinforced their solvency. A characteristic of the Labour Bank from its very beginning, and until the creation in 1991 of the Mondragon Corporation, was the existence of two divisions: the Financial Division and the Business Division. While the former performed the ordinary functions of a savings bank, the functions of the Business Division were autonomous. On the one hand, it supported existing cooperatives in matters of internationalization, management and legal advice, and on the other, it promoted the creation of new cooperatives, both in sectors where they already existed and in new ones such as research, the primary sector, and the educational one.

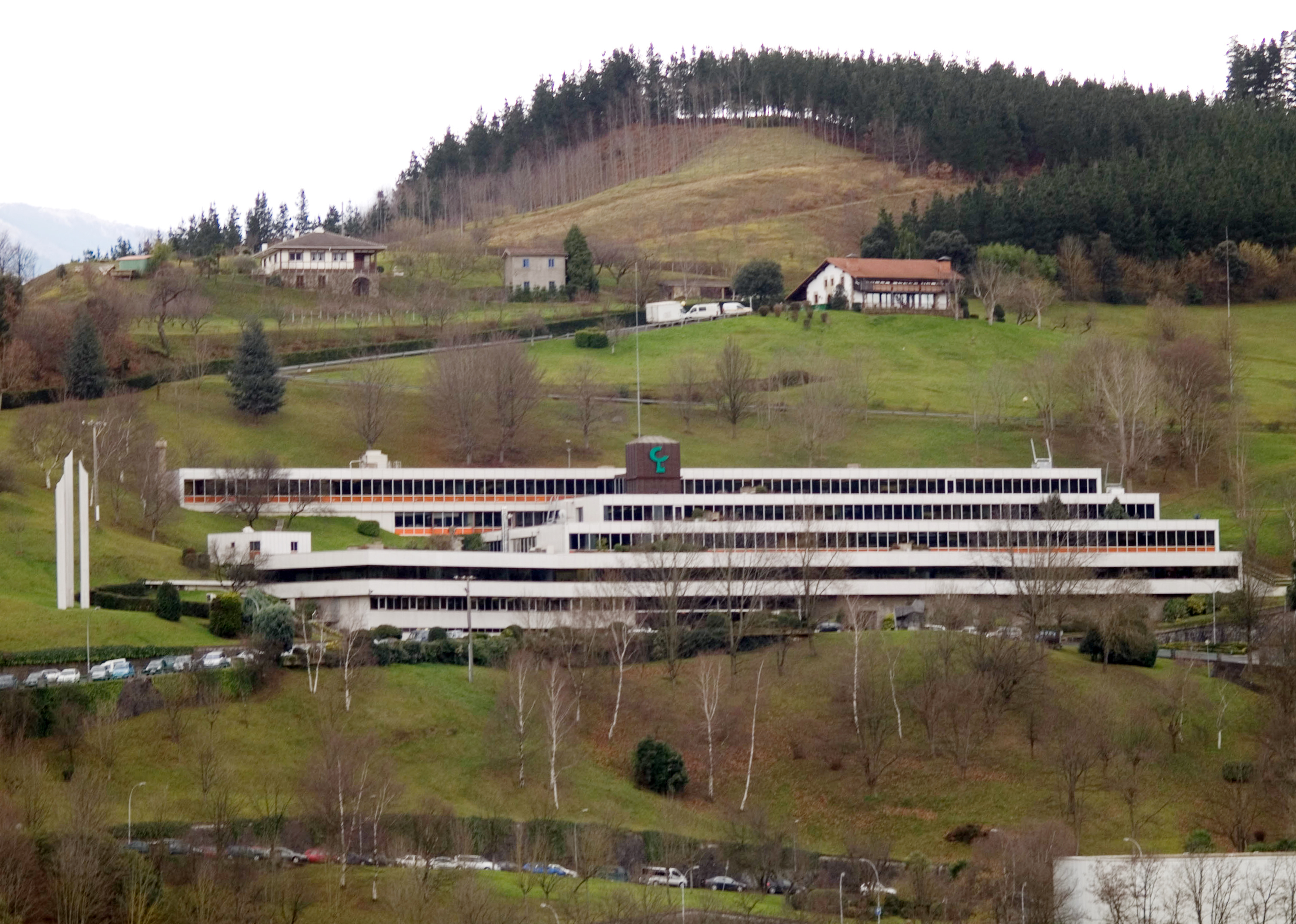
Laboral Kutxa's main offices in Mondragon.

In addition to linking employees and industrial cooperatives as partners, Arizmendiarrieta wanted the rest of the population to get involved, and for this he used simple and popular messages. Thus, at the inauguration in 1960 of a new Labour Bank office, his motto was "O notebook, o suitcase", that is, save to invest and create jobs, or emigrate.

==== Mutual assistance ====
Like the financial entity, in June 1959, the EPSV (Voluntary Social Welfare Entity) known as "Lagun Aro" was created to respond to the cooperative members' need for social protection. The reason for this was that being self-employed workers, as opposed to employees, they were excluded from the General Public Social Security Scheme. Its function was, on the one hand, to provide a mixed coverage system that included benefits from the Public Social Security System through the Self-Employed Regime to which the cooperative members were affiliated, and on the other, to enable access to Lagun Aro's own benefits, such as coverage for illness, unemployment in the event that a cooperative was in difficulty, retirement, widowhood, and complementary health care. As in Laboral Kutxa, the cooperatives were members of Lagun Aro.

=== Agricultural cooperative ===
Arizmendiarrieta came from a family of peasants from Barínaga, and did not understand social development without the primary sector. After the first industrial cooperative, he promoted the LANA cooperative, integrating the livestock, agricultural and forestry sectors of the Alto Deba Valley. It would be a mixed cooperative with two types of partners, the producers of the villages, and the workers of the transformation cooperative. After several years of dynamic growth, specialization took place, creating three divisions: dairy, livestock and forestry. Over the years, the first two were integrated into the Erkop agro-food group, and the forestry activity into the Construction Division.

=== Cooperative university ===
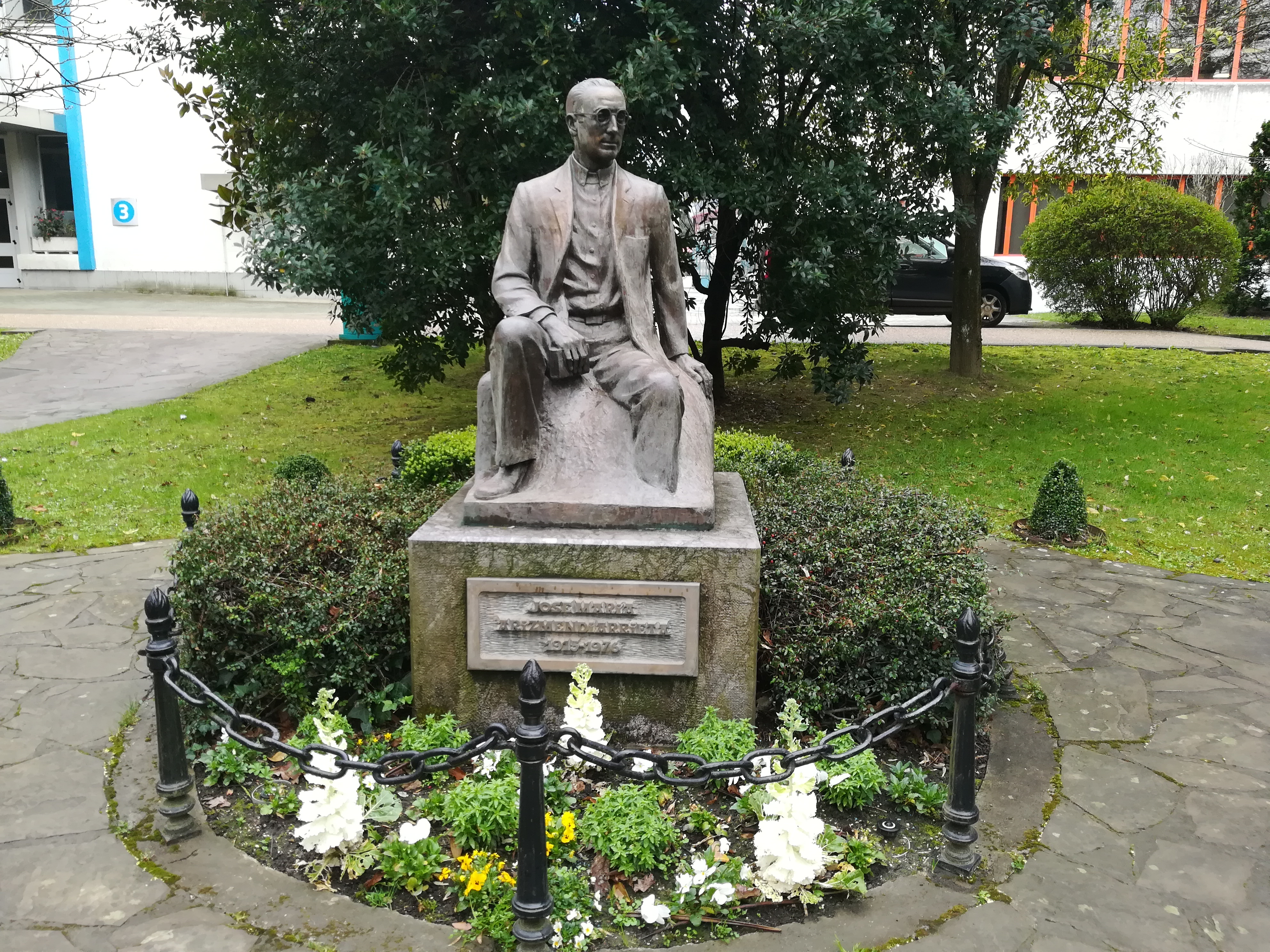
Jose Maria Arizmendiarrieta's sculpture in Mondragon University's Mondragon campus.

At the beginning of 1961, Arizmendiarrieta began to structure the idea of a new Professional School with a higher academic level in the Alto Deba Valley, with opening centers in the three main towns, Mondragon, Bergara and Oñati, which together had a population of 50,000 inhabitants. As an indispensable condition for the development of industrial cooperatives, he wanted students well trained by the best teachers in workshops and laboratories who were close to the levels of research and development of the leading European countries. And this would facilitate the interrelation with companies. In 1963, work began on the new Professional School in Iturripe, designed to house 1,500 students, who would gradually reach the degree of Official, High Level Vocational Cycle Studies, and Technical Engineering, officially inaugurated in 1967. An important peculiarity was that the school's partners belonged to the cooperative and non-cooperative companies of the valley, the teachers, and also the students, having representation in the Assembly and the Governing Council.

At that time, he developed the MEDUO University Project, involving the School Association of the University of Oñati, made public in 1965, and taking as its historical inspiration the old Sancti Spiritus University, created in 1545 and in operation until 1902. Its decentralizing approach involved locating engineering related to mechanics, electronics and machine tools in Mondragon, commerce and business administration degrees in Oñati, and chemicals linked to the textile industry in Bergara. In addition, he proposed a 'popular and social' university, which should pay attention to the practical application of the principle of equal educational opportunities, so that it would be a driving force for development through the institutionalization of lifelong learning. The project turned out to be too ambitious for the time, and it was not until 1997 that the current Mondragon University was established.

=== County Cooperative Group ===
In the Laboral Kutxa's Annual report of 1961, Arizmendiarrieta explained his ideas on intra- and inter-cooperative cooperation as an element of solidarity to achieve personal and collective advancement. He proposed an adequate process of capitalization by indirect means, and at the same time an indispensable formula of development through industrial concentration.

The directors of ULGOR led and developed the idea, which resulted in the constitution of a co-brand group called Ularco, which included the industrial cooperatives of the Alto Deba Valley. Initially, it would be made up of the industrial companies ULGOR, Arrasate, Copreci and Ederlan, constituting a federal union of cooperatives, with a similar orientation to groups of capitalist companies, with the difference that in these the power was vertical and configured by the arithmetic majority of the capital, while in the Ularco Group the power was rooted in a pact of cession of sovereignty. One of the greatest achievements of collective solidarity of Arizmendiarrieta with the creation of the Group in 1964 was to implement the "reconversion of results" between all the partners of the different cooperative companies, when ULGOR achieved 30% of profits on sales and in Ederlan it was just 3%. The new business group stated in the second article of its regulations that its corporate purpose was to guarantee "the budgets of the modern company with the appropriate technical, financial and commercial deployment".

=== Student's Industrial Cooperative ===
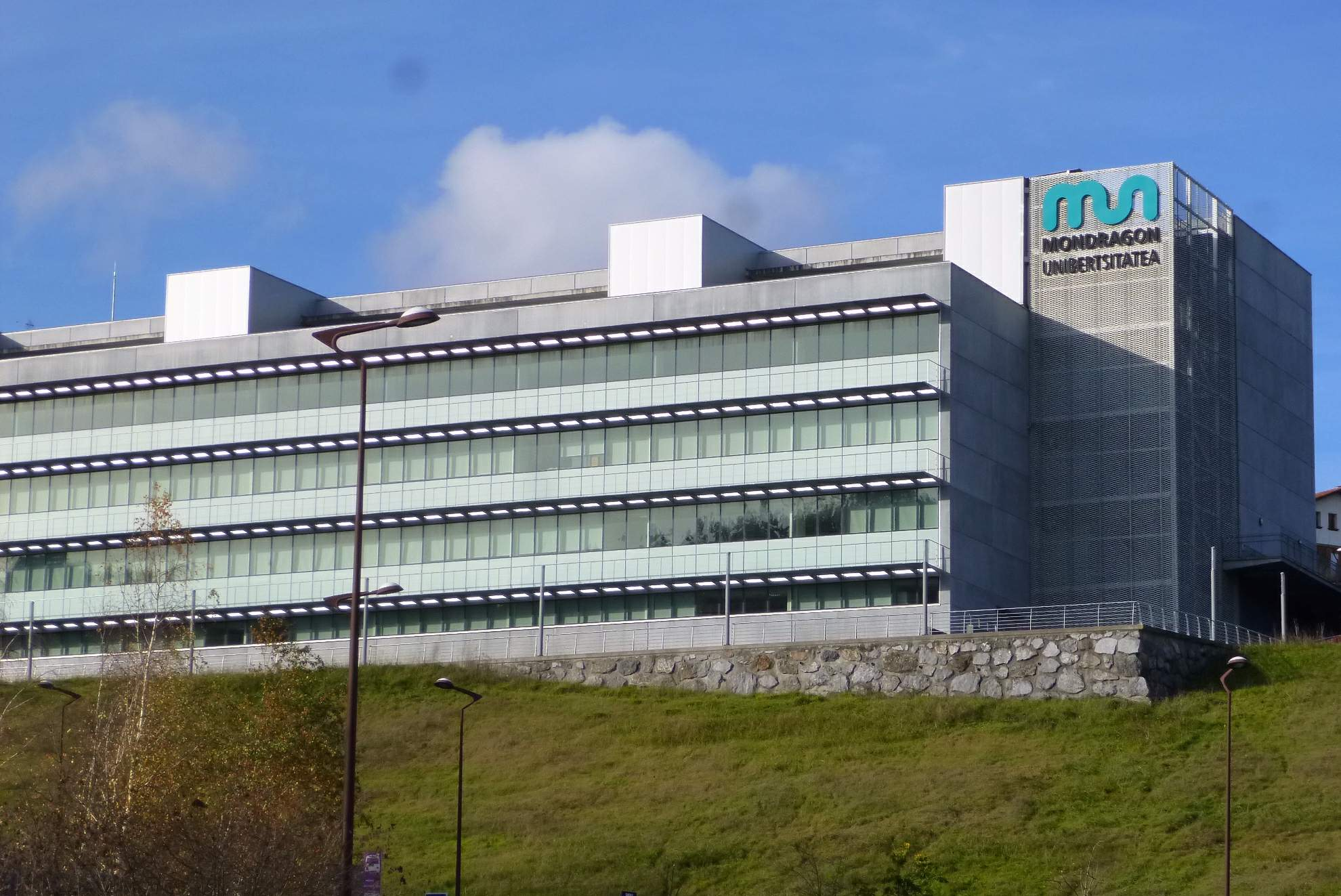
A building in the Garia Technology Park of the Mondragon University Polytechnic High School.

Arizmendiarrieta developed the project to create an industrial cooperative for the students of the Professional School with a double purpose. On the one hand, it would provide students with limited economic resources the possibility of paying for their High Level Vocational Cycle studies. And on the other, it would promote dual training through theoretical and practical classes at the School, and the experience of working in a real company.

In November 1965, he began the procedures for the administrative recognition of the company Alecoop (Cooperative School Labor Activity), which became official in April 1966. The industrial purpose of the company was the manufacture and sale of auxiliary tools for mechanical workshops and electrical installations for industrial assemblies, according to commissions or own study projects. The students would work in a cooperative regime for half a day, which had to be compatible with the school demands of the partners.

=== Women's Industrial Cooperative ===
In all cooperatives, women's participation was subject to rights equal to those of men. But in the mid-1960s, Arizmendiarrieta's concern for the labor emancipation of women became more apparent, since the limit of women's participation in work was marriage. In the cooperatives, the institutional associative link was the "partnership contract" and not the usual work contract, so the single members saw it terminated once they got married. For Arizmendiarrieta, marriage was almost a sentence of exile for women, which separated them from social life, and often tended to increase 'couple problems'.

To improve the situation, Arizmendiarrieta promoted the construction of a female pavilion for classrooms and laboratories at the School, which would allow young female students to study chemistry and electronics, and, in parallel with this, the creation of a women's industrial cooperative, founding the Auzo Lagun company in November 1967. Its activity is the direct catering service, in which meals are prepared on site for schools, companies, residences and hospitals.

=== Cooperative Research Center ===
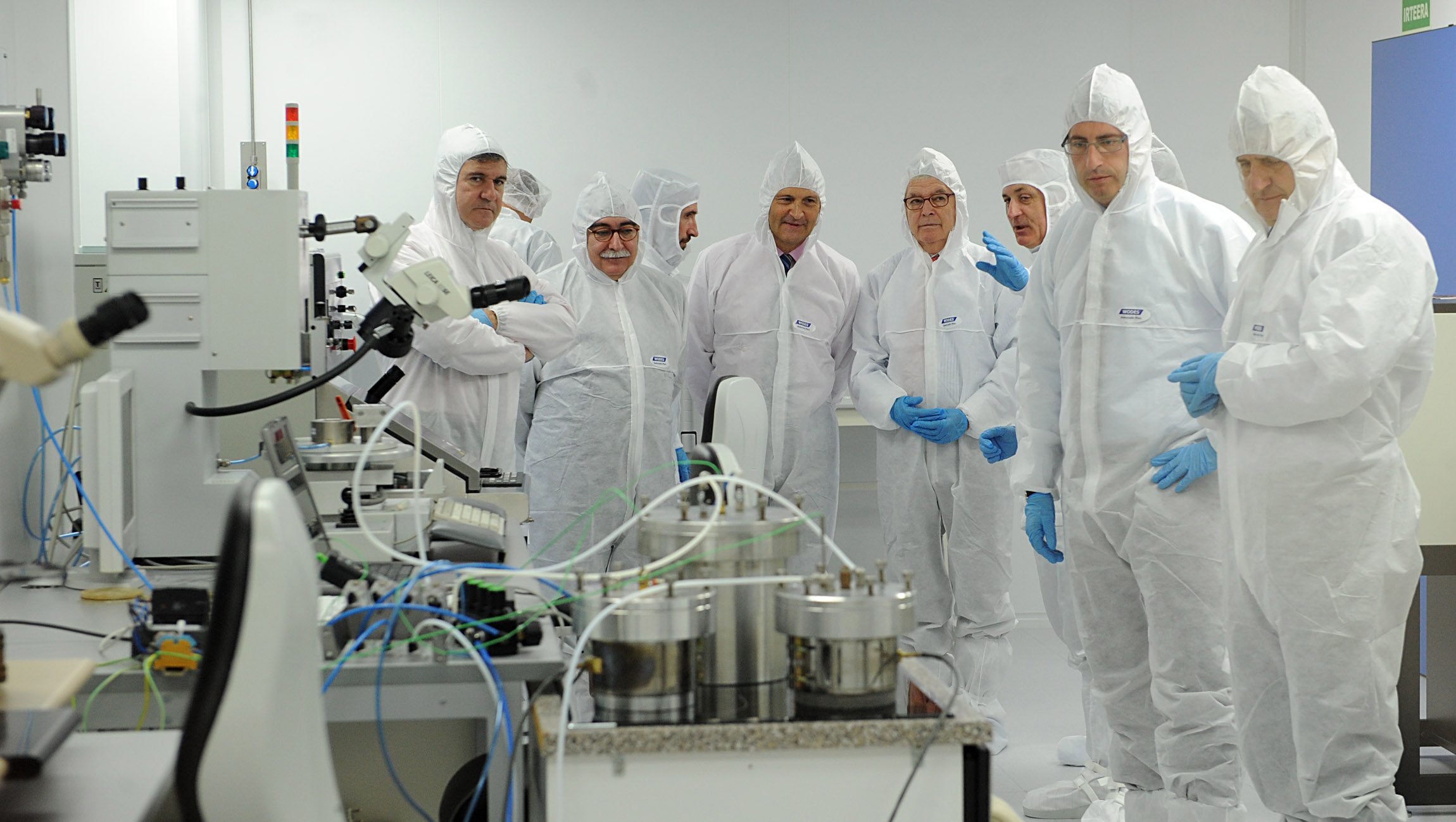
A nanotechnology laboratory.

Arizmendiarrieta was aware of the technological dependency implied by the acquisition of patents abroad, and more specifically that of electronic semiconductors in Germany and that of electrical appliances in Italy. For this reason, on his trips abroad he analyzed the collaboration networks between companies, universities and research centers as a basis for economic and social development. In 1965, he began to include his ideas on the importance of research and technological development in the weekly talks at the Professional School. He considered that the competition between nations was between the companies that collaborated with the laboratories, so it was necessary to invest in human capital and technology. With his usual pragmatism, he convinced several professors at the School to dedicate part of their time to applied technological research, and after a few years of testing, in 1968 a team was created with partial autonomy from the School and with its own projects.

Subsequently, he encouraged the cooperatives of the Alto Deba Valley to contract projects to the research team, and Laboral Kutxa to financially lead the construction of a separate building from the Professional School. The dual objective was to provide it with its own research capacity in the medium and long term in the style of the German Fraunhofers, under the legal tutelage of the Professional School, and eventually to set up the first cooperative company for Applied Research. In 1973 Laboral Kutxa approved the project, and in October 1974 work began on the new building. The tutelage of the teaching center lasted until 1982, when Ikerlan had its own legal personality as a cooperative, with the Valley companies and the researchers themselves being partners. Arizmendiarrieta also involved the Public administration in financing generic projects, being a source of inspiration for public-private collaboration in the field of research in the Basque Country.

=== Cooperative Corporation ===
In 1966, Arizmendiarrieta visited France in February to visit laboratories and factories in Paris, Dijon and Grenoble. In September he toured in Germany visiting different commercial, credit, consumer, and industrial cooperatives in Bonn, Frankfurt, Stuttgart, Munich, Hamburg and Berlin. In both cases, he came back with the idea that Mondragon could also reach the degree of harmonic development that he had seen, for which it was necessary to become competitive in increasingly larger areas. All this served to reinforce his permanent discourse of cooperation.

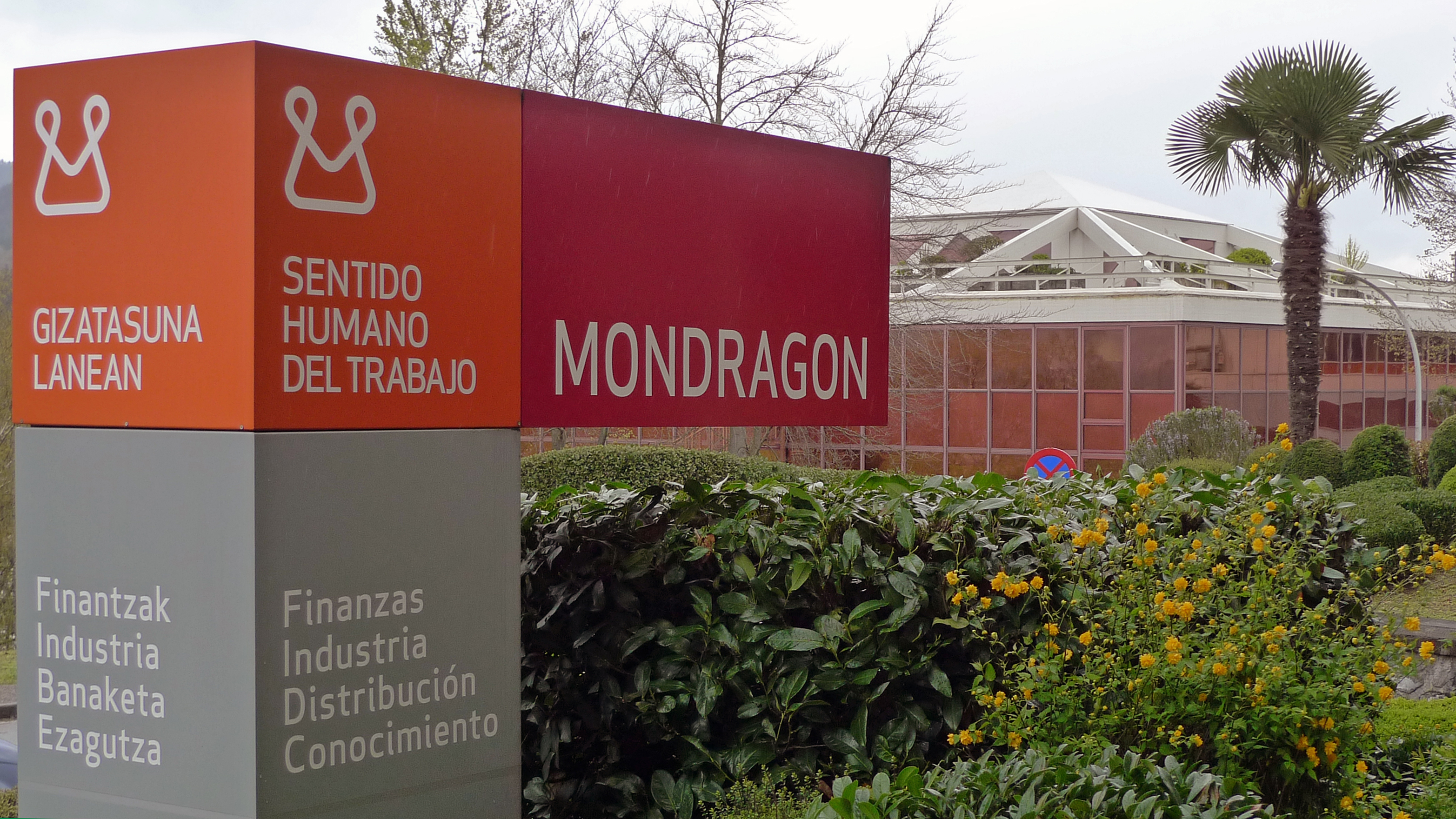
Entrance to the headquarters of the corporation.

The cooperatives were integrated into Regional Groups such as Ularco, based on their geographical proximity, and it was not until December 1984 that the reorganization pre-congress was undertaken with a more business and less sociological focus, creating the Mondragon Cooperative Group. The process culminated in the first two Congresses of 1987 and 1989, approving the basic principles of what is currently the Mondragon Corporation.

== Thought and practical principles ==
=== Precedents ===
Arizmendiarrieta, in his quest for social justice and human dignity, was not a visionary who created business models by intuition. He had extensive historical, business and ideological knowledge based on many years of observation and reading. His uniqueness was that, with a lot of pragmatism, he knew how to help implement his theoretical ideas in concrete creations.

==== Historical ====
Arizmendiarrieta knew well the cooperative precedents of the Basque Country. In fact, the spirit of cooperation has long been deeply rooted among farmers, popularly known as "Auzolan" (Community Work). It is the performance of free work by neighbours that benefits everyone; through a neighborhood assembly, the place, method and people (one member for each farm) who are going to carry it out are decided, mainly the opening or maintenance of public roads, churches, hermitages or public buildings, or as and when a neighbor needs it.

On the other hand, in the 20th century the first consumer cooperative, promoted by the nationalist union ELA/STV, was created in Bilbao in 1919, followed by others in Vizcaya. These cooperatives were also open to non-members. And they operated according to the cooperative principles of the Rochdale Society of Equitable Pioneers, founded in 1844 in England, and currently maintained by the ICA – International Cooperative Alliance. In the Vitoria Congress in 1933, the union agreed to strengthen the cooperative movement, and the first production and credit cooperatives were also created.

Also, in 1920 the socialist union UGT helped several affiliates, workers of companies in crisis, to achieve self-employment by creating the ALFA cooperative in Eibar. It began manufacturing weapons, and from 1925 also sewing machines. It was the largest industrial cooperative of the time and its managing director, Toribio Echevarria, was admired and loved by Arizmendiarrieta for his professionalism and integrity.

==== Business ====
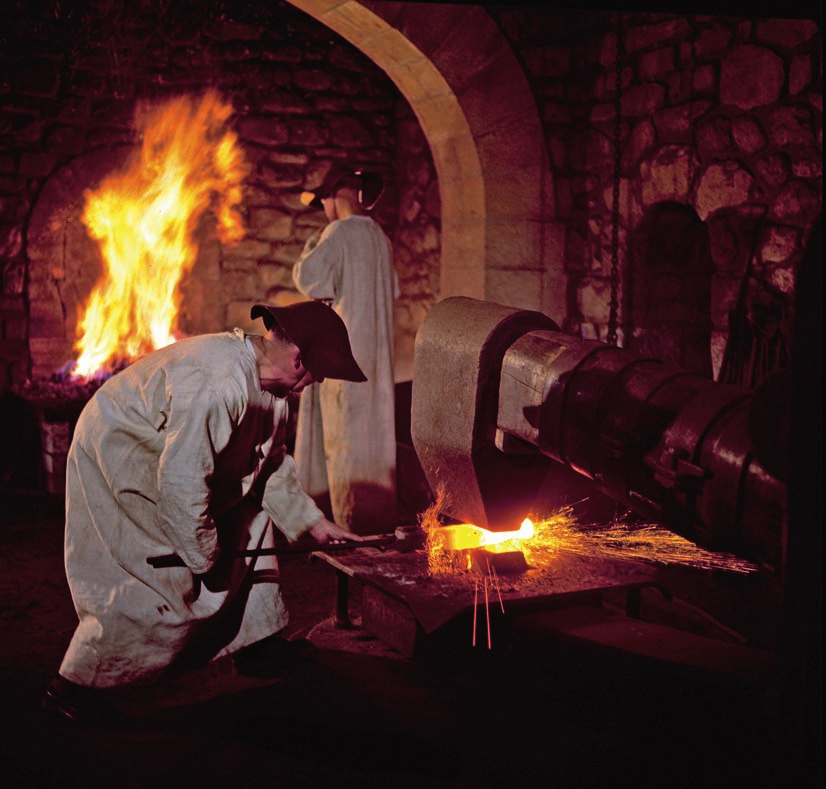
Working in a forge.

Since the thirteenth century, the Deba Valley and its seven towns have been linked to forges and metallurgy. Thus, in the 15th century, a large part of the 1,900 inhabitants of Mondragon dedicated themselves to obtaining steel billets, which on the one hand, they sold and exported for the manufacture of weapons, and on the other, they transformed by hand into nails and ironwork. The forges were complex installations that allowed the energy of the water to activate the machinery necessary to produce iron and steel until the Industrial Revolution of the 19th century, when blast furnaces were introduced.

When Arizmendiarrieta arrived in the depressed post-war Mondragon in 1941, the largest company was the "Locksmith S.A.", created in 1906 from the merger of the companies "Vergarajauregui, Resusta y Cia", from 1869, and "The Guipuzcoan Locksmith", from 1901. It had 850 employees at its foundry and machining plants in Mondragon and Bergara, was publicly listed on the Stock exchange of Madrid, and was the driving force behind several smaller locksmith companies. In mid-1948 it had 2,000 workers. The second most important company in Mondragon was the "Modern Locksmith ELMA", with more than 300 employees.

In all the towns of the Deba Valley there were numerous small industrial companies, among which two medium-sized ones stood out. In Bergara there was "La Algodonera San Antonio, S.A.", created in 1846, which had 500 employees and was dedicated to the production of large-scale textiles. In Oñati there was "Hijos de Juan de Garay, S.A.", created in 1864, and dedicated to the production of welded steel tubes, with 400 employees.

==== Ideological ====
Arizmendiarrieta had a small and austere office in the Professional School, and he was an inveterate reader of unusual topics for a modest priest, such as books by the Labour Party, or the "red bishops" such as Antonio Pildain and Vicente Enrique y Tarancón, or the new Catholic intellectuals of the ecclesia such as the Spanish Episcopal Conference, Iribarren and Rodríguez de Yrre, or the communist manifesto of Karl Marx and Friedrich Engels.

In his search for a religious solution to social questions, he began to elaborate his own thoughts, which were a conjunction of the classical and social-Catholic sources of the seminary and the new socialist and personalist theories. He bought books by thinkers with the gifts needed to make a real world impact, such as the active Catholic priest Hans Küng, or Jacques Maritain, Emmanuel Mounier, José Ortega y Gasset, Jacques Leclerq and the Labor leaders, and gave copies to his disciples.

For him, reading was an essential source of inspiration, and he underlined the ideas he thought were most interesting in the hundreds of books in his private library. He rigorously wrote his reflections on "pedestrian humanism" in 10,495 files and writings. After his imprisonment during the civil war he only wrote in Spanish, but in August 1968 he began to use Basque again in the magazine TU Lankide, in a total of up to 57 articles, the last three in 1976.

=== Example in austerity ===
Arizmendiarrieta lived his entire life in personal austerity, as a young man out of family necessity and, after the emergence of the cooperatives, out of personal conviction. He lived with the limited salary of curate of the parish. He never received anything from the cooperatives or the entities that he promoted and he worked in a small office of the Professional School. He did not drink, and ate very little. In Mondragon he traveled by bicycle like the workers, until several cooperative leaders "stole" it, replacing it later with a velosolex (bicycle with a small motor). And for trips outside, he would ask friends for favors or take the cheapest tickets.

Despite being the promoter of numerous cooperatives, and often the drafter of the projects and statutes, which he personally defended before the different administrations, he gave up holding any position. In the few individual distinctions that he accepted, he included in them those who had helped him achieve his aims, just as he did in the openings of new pavilions and companies.

He never acted for personal interests, and despite the fact that some class-oriented businessmen from Mondragon were detractors of the popular "priest", and were suspicious of the participation of workers in the capital and management of the new business model, Arizmendiarrieta maintained his ideology of social justice. In 1956 he was threatened by the Civil Governor with transfer, and he replied that he would obey the decision of his superior of the diocese, but that he would not become an accommodating priest.

=== Personal closeness ===
Arizmendiarrieta shaped his ideas into concrete achievements involving many people: politicians, businessmen, teachers, young people, etc. And he did it with empathy and respect for everyone. His daily work was based on an exercise of renunciation, of homage, submission, deference, gratitude and a quiet aura of authority. As a young man he moved around the town on a bicycle, out of affinity with the workers. He ate frugally, and when a charge from Madrid visited Mondragon for an event, Arizmendiarrieta would notify the nuns of the college to receive the visitors with a hot broth.

In 1958, the Director of Professional Education in Madrid Guillermo Reyna visited Mondragon. He was surprised by the casual way the students treated Arizmendiarrieta, and he wrote to him: “It gave me a bad impression that the students did not get up, greet, or offer the slightest sign of deference towards you, who are their Director, when we passed through the room where several were sitting and others were changing their shoes". Arizmendiarrieta, after apologizing, replied "I don't allow them to treat me as a Director, because I am just one amongst the rest in the School. It has been a procedure that has given me good results so far." In fact, Arizmendiarrieta was never listed as Director.

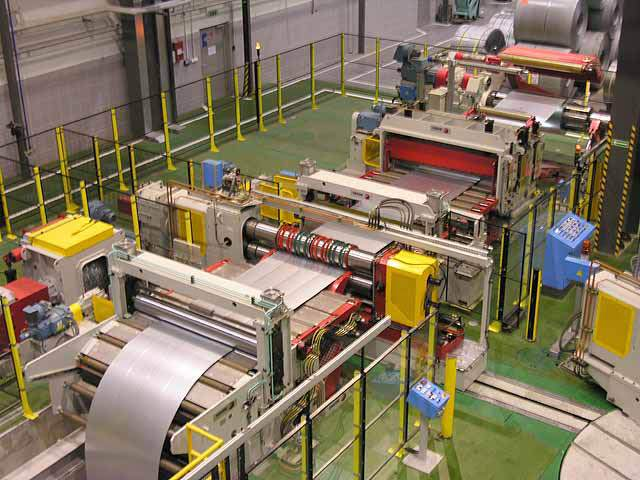
Fagor Arrasate cooperative's machine tool for iron and steel.

In 1965 the Minister of Labor arrived to award him the gold medal for Merit at Work, and in the speeches, the President of the Mondragon Education League highlighted the desire of the curate to detach his work from any personal interest, "He is still as poor as when he arrived 25 years ago, and just like then, his mother continues to send him beans and potatoes from the farmhouse." To conclude, he said, "He has created a mentality, a way of doing things. People have turned to him for everything, and he always has a free moment, a word of encouragement, an idea to solve a problem." The honoree's answer did not surprise anyone. He had no merit, he always spoke in the plural, losing his individuality in the anonymous work of the hundreds of people who had worked with him in the activities for which he was awarded: “I say without modesty that these merits that have been attributed to me for official purposes are due to each and every one of those who have worked during these past years”.

=== Sowing years ===
From the time Arizmendiarrieta arrived in Mondragon in 1941 with his wooden suitcase, until the first industrial cooperative ULGOR began operating, 15 years of preparation passed. The cycle began with the creation of the precarious Professional School in 1943, where the children of all the workers could study, unlike the Locksmith Union Apprentice School. Arizmendiarrieta did not yet have a defined cooperative model, but he did have a clear idea: that the worker can only emancipate himself through education and his own work. Therefore, he encouraged the spirit of responsibility and cooperation.

Other actions of Arizmendiarrieta were the organization of a library for youth, the organization of study circles for older people, and the foundation in June 1943, under his direction, of a Social or Sociology Academy with the inspiration of Catholic Action. The objective of his circles or meetings was "to train future worker leaders." In addition to his teaching at the Professional School, Arizmendiarrieta taught more than two thousand study circles, some for religious and human formation; others for social formation. This is equivalent to saying that he gave at least one conference every 2.7 days, for fifteen consecutive years, not discounting holidays and vacations.

In any case, the Professional School was his favorite place of catholic and social apostolate. Every day at two in the afternoon he gave his 20-minute talk in the auditorium to professors and students of the 2nd year of Master's and Technical Engineering. The topics were diverse and unknown to the audience, such as Russian kolkhoz peasant cooperatives, Yugoslav self-management or German co-management. In addition to the content, his talks were difficult to understand, due to his monotonous tone and difficult language. Aware of this, he used short quotes that were easy to remember such as "Knowledge is Power", "knowledge must be socialized to democratize power", "it is easier to educate a young person than to reform a man", or "give a fish to a man and he will eat that day; teach him to fish and he will eat for the rest of his life".

In the sermons at his daily mass in the parish he also used short quotations to compensate for his difficult oratory. Once, the parishioners asked the bishopric to replace him because they did not understand him, but the bishop did not agree to do this, valuing his social work more. And in July 1967, when he was invited to Madrid as a speaker in the debates on the future status of Spanish cooperativism, chaired by the General Director of Social Promotion, the attendees listened to him in silence because his oratory was difficult for them. To alleviate the situation, the director told them "Keep in mind that Father Arizmendiarrieta thinks in Basque, and translates it into Spanish."

=== Training and work ===
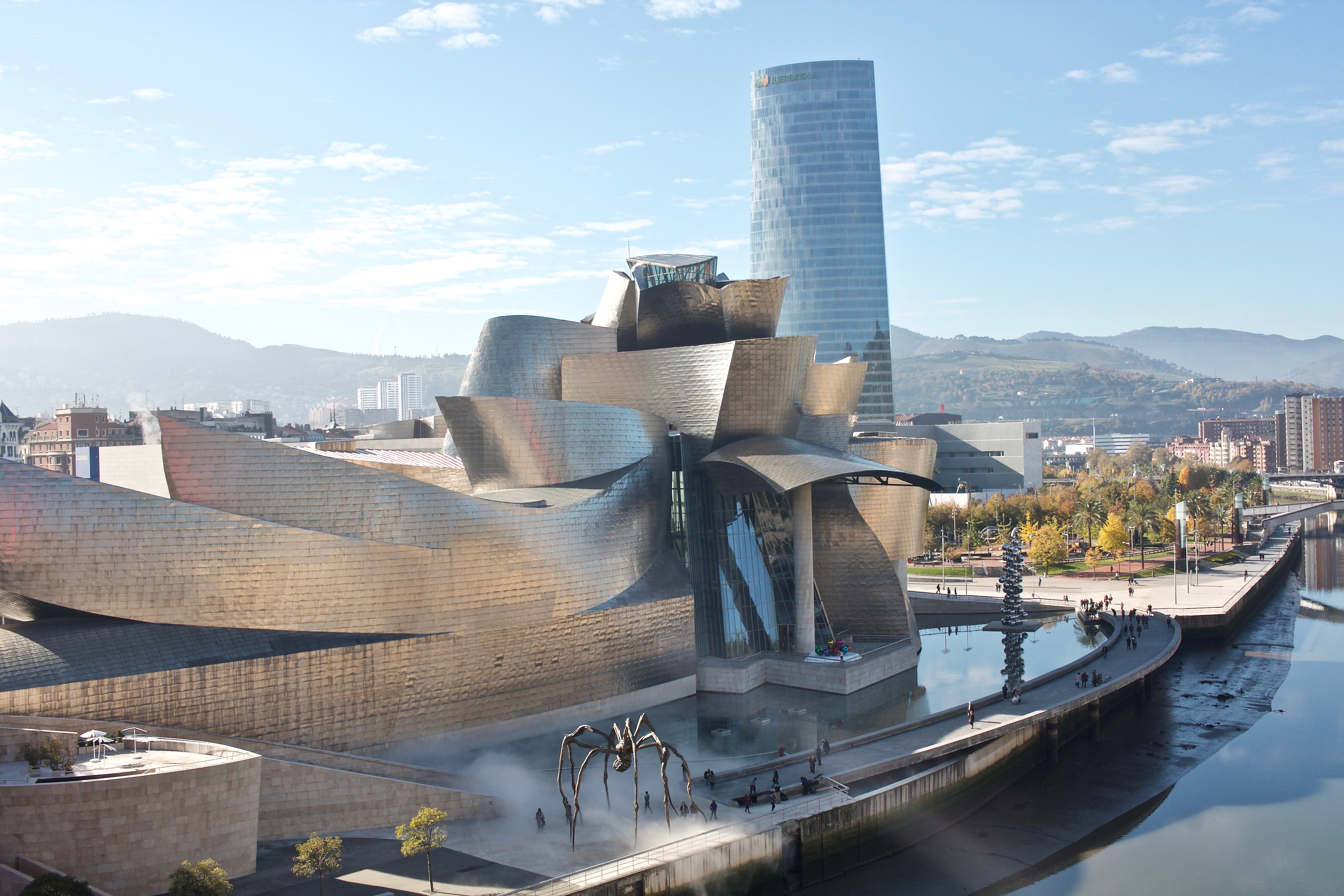
The Guggenheim Museum in Bilbao in 1997 by the Urssa cooperative.

Arizmendiarrieta led his collaborators by example. His training curriculum vitae, written by himself, shows his dedication to his studies: "Philosophy and Theology" at the seminary of Vitoria, "Ethical-Social" at the University of Comillas, enrolled in special intensive courses. And "Economics" in intensive courses at the Social School of Vitoria, from 1948 to 1952.

He maintained close contact with the Vitoria seminary, where year after year he attended the courses organized at the Social School. His interests ranged from economics and sociology to philosophy and pedagogy. He understood his own role as chaplain of Catholic Action as someone who spurred others to do good, and above all, as an educator. He made an effort to convince others, especially young people, of the importance of training, and often repeated quotes such as "Teaching and education are the first requirements of a community, if you do not want all kinds of companies to become stagnant or half developed", "Man is made through training", "It is better to light a match than to curse the darkness", or "Sowing in time is professionally training our young people. This is the expense that is transformed into seed that produces a hundredfold."

The argument of the profitability of investments made in education appears many times in Arizmendiarrieta's writings. And his insistence on community responsibility for education has two roots. One is his personal experience of the insufficiency of the State, and the other is his general idea that society should tend to self-management in all its forms, solving its own problems on its own. But he advocated dual training, so as not to leave the entire burden of the cost of studies to the community, but rather the student himself had to assume a part. In addition, Arizmendiarrieta was opposed to the division of life into two periods, one of study (at the expense of those who work), and another of work. He thought that study and work, rather than consecutive stages, should constitute combined activities that would last. The young person should combine study and work, and the mature person should have the right and duty to combine work and study.

=== Work and union ===
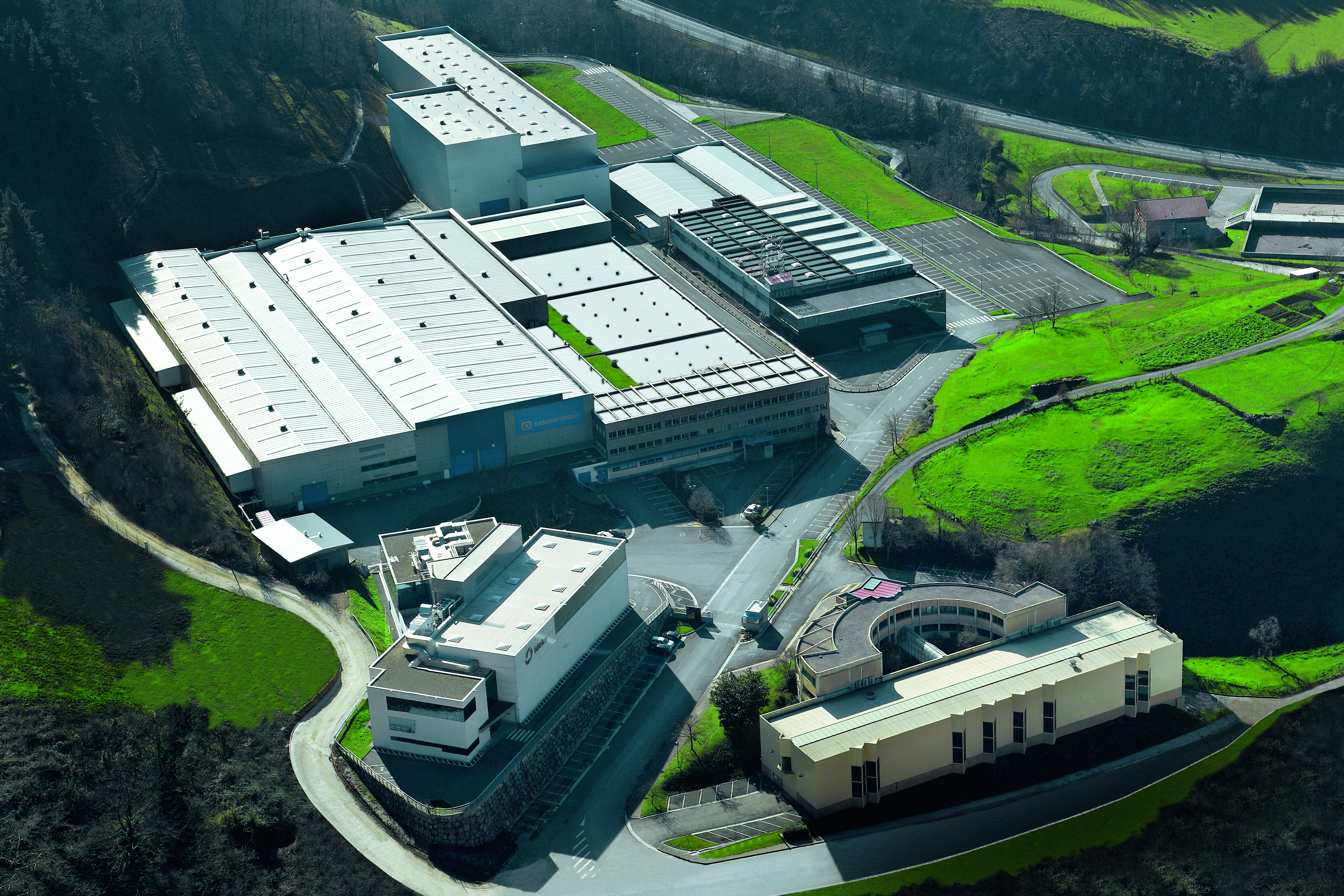
The main factory of the Danobat cooperative in Elgoibar.

Arizmendiarrieta created in September 1960 the cooperative magazine that he always edited, "TU-Work and Union", initially called "Cooperation". He said that "Work is the firm basis for development and promotion, the Union is the lever that multiplies the forces of all, and Cooperation is for us a system of solidarity, to make work the appropriate instrument for advancement, personal and collective." Therefore, he insisted on collecting these concepts in the statutes of the cooperatives.

He conceived the magazine as "a constant invitation to dialogue, relationship and cooperation for the practical application of the postulates of social justice in the business environment in a climate of freedom and love, indispensable in a work community". He considered work as a means of personal self-realization and solidarity, of individual improvement and collective improvement, the basis for a more unquestionable humanistic and social conscience.

He repeatedly explained that work dignifies people, and that different levels of development in regions and countries depend on work. He noted that a study by experts showed that in the United States, the contribution of nature, land, forests, rivers, seas, and mines to the level of development was estimated at one-eighth, and that the labour factor was seven-eighths. The Deba Valley itself, where Mondragon is located, is not notable for its natural wealth, but its development is driven and created by the work of its inhabitants.

As for the union, it was seen as a sign of solidarity in a democracy, so cooperatives should be democratic, with each member having only one vote. At the same time, unity demanded the responsibility of all, because unity is the strength of the weak, and solidarity is a powerful lever that multiplies strength.

=== The reform of the company ===
Arizmendiarrieta sought the dignity of workers through the reform of the company, inspired by the postulates of Christian Social doctrine. As early as 1933, the program of the Basque trade union ELA / STV established that the rights of the worker were not limited to a fair wage, so he demanded his participation in the company, making him share in the profits by issuing shares in the capital, as well as recognising him as a co-manager of the company. After the Civil war of 1936 unions were banned, but the Christian Social doctrine was present in Catholic workers' organizations, gaining further development in the 1960s. In fact, it was the Catholic labour movements in Germany and Belgium that, taking advantage of the post-war reconstruction situation, had more vigorously demanded workers' access to the company's management, profits, and shareholding, with harsh criticism of the predominance of capital over man.

In 1956, after fifteen unsuccessful years proposing changes to the leadership of the Locksmith Union, Arizmendiarrieta made the momentous decision to encourage a group of professionally well-trained young people to leave their well-established jobs in the Locksmith Union to create a cooperative. He set out to realize his ideas on the primacy of work over capital, on self-management, and on democracy. Of course, Arizmendiarrieta's relations with some employers worsened markedly, and difficulties arose even in relation to the Professional School, where until then the collaboration had been optimal and generous. After the initial success of the cooperatives, in the following years he wrote that one of the noblest and most spiritual tasks that could be undertaken was to awaken in the people the consciousness of their own potential. It was necessary for the workers to be able to be revitalised with the hope of a true emancipation of their own through work and Christian peace. Henceforth, he stopped alluding explicitly to the reform of the company.

=== Leadership and ascendancy ===
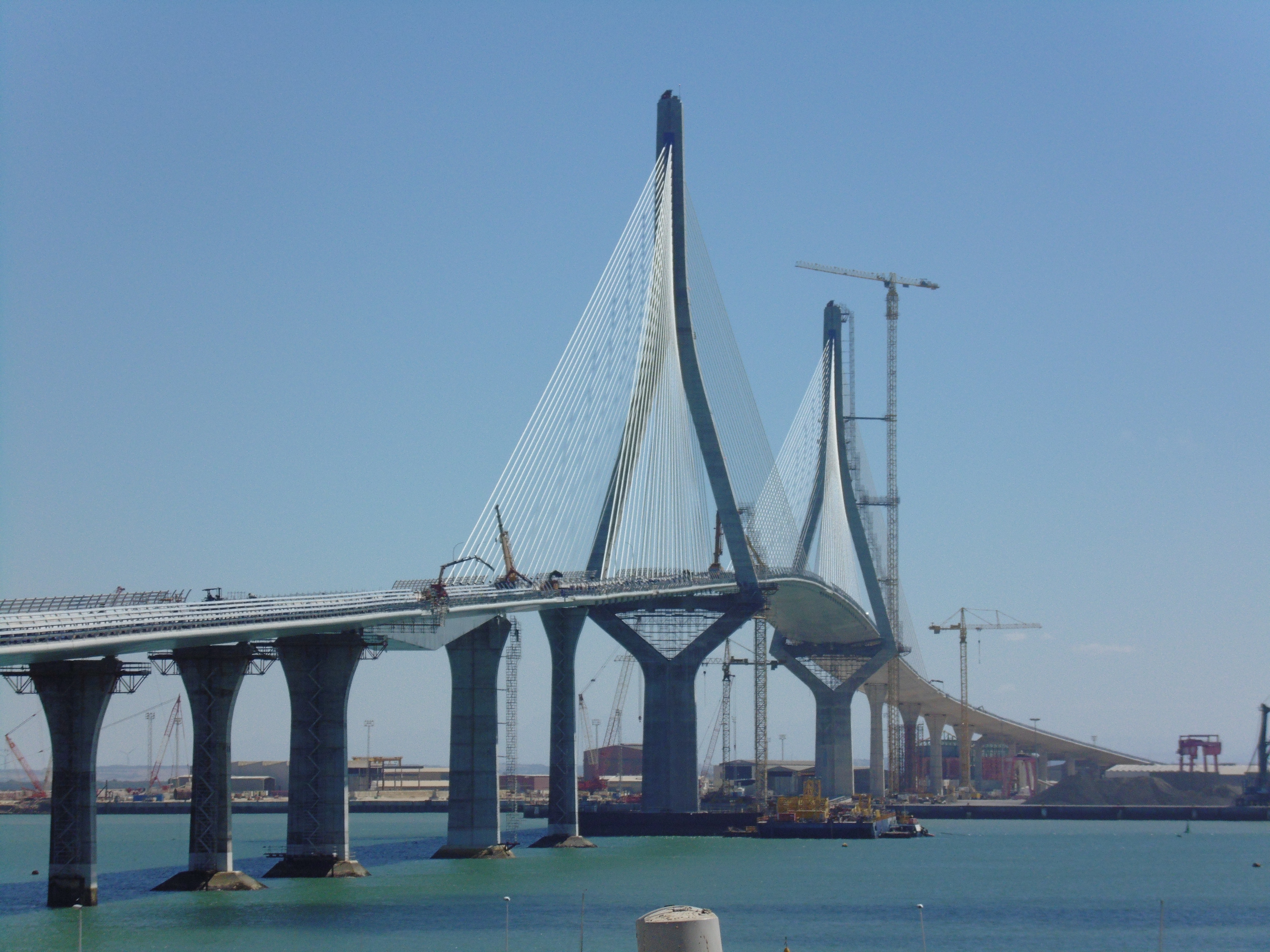
The La Pepa bridge, built by the Ulma cooperative, in Cádiz.

Arizmendiarrieta's working method was based on teaming up with young people he trusted. The teaching work that he carried out in the first Professional School of Zaldispe and the creation of the Sports Youth entity, as well as his participation in Catholic Action, enabled him to get to know many dedicated young people. Thus, in 1946 he selected eleven young people to continue their Industrial engineering studies on their own, but enrolled in the University of Zaragoza, about 200 km. away, and in 1955 five of them who were already outstanding professionals in the Locksmith Union, were encouraged to create the first industrial cooperative, named ULGOR. His success in the creation of new organizations from 1941 to 1955 made the young people involved more secure, paying the mortgage on the houses of newlyweds, so that they would abandon secure jobs in the best company in Mondragon, and embark on an adventure with an uncertain future, but confident in their mentor.

In 1959 ULGOR was growing successfully and had established itself in the market. From the beginning, the partners had elected the electronic engineer Alfonso Gorroñogoitia as president of the Governing Council, and in turn the Council had appointed the chemical engineer José María Ormaetxea as managing director. But Arizmendiarrieta had in mind the idea of creating a cooperative credit entity, and after drafting the project and the statutes of the Labour Bank on his own, he managed to get the ministries to approve its creation. To manage it, he sought honesty above all else, and proposed to Ormaetxea that he should be his director, going from managing director of a large company to a modest office on Ferrerías street, where he began working with another employee. Ormaetxea pointed out that "I accepted, despite being completely unaware of the banking business, and barely knowing how to interpret a balance sheet". Likewise, Arizmendiarrieta convinced Gorroñogoitia to combine the two presidencies, given his high position in the Governing and Social Councils of ULGOR.

In 1965 Arizmendiarrieta personally promoted the Alecop student industrial cooperative. To finance his installations, he requested subsidies from public bodies and a loan from the Labour Bank, which requested guarantors. Arizmendiarrieta approached several professors of the Professional School for this purpose, one of them being the future founder and director of the Ikerlan Research Center, Manolo Quevedo, "I replied that I would sign, but after obtaining the approval of my wife, because we already had three small daughters. Endorsing a company in which the partners and managers were going to be the students, and the guarantors would not have any connection, was certainly unusual".

=== Controversies ===
Arizmendiarrieta developed his concept of human enterprise through action and practice, which generated controversies that can be grouped into five areas:

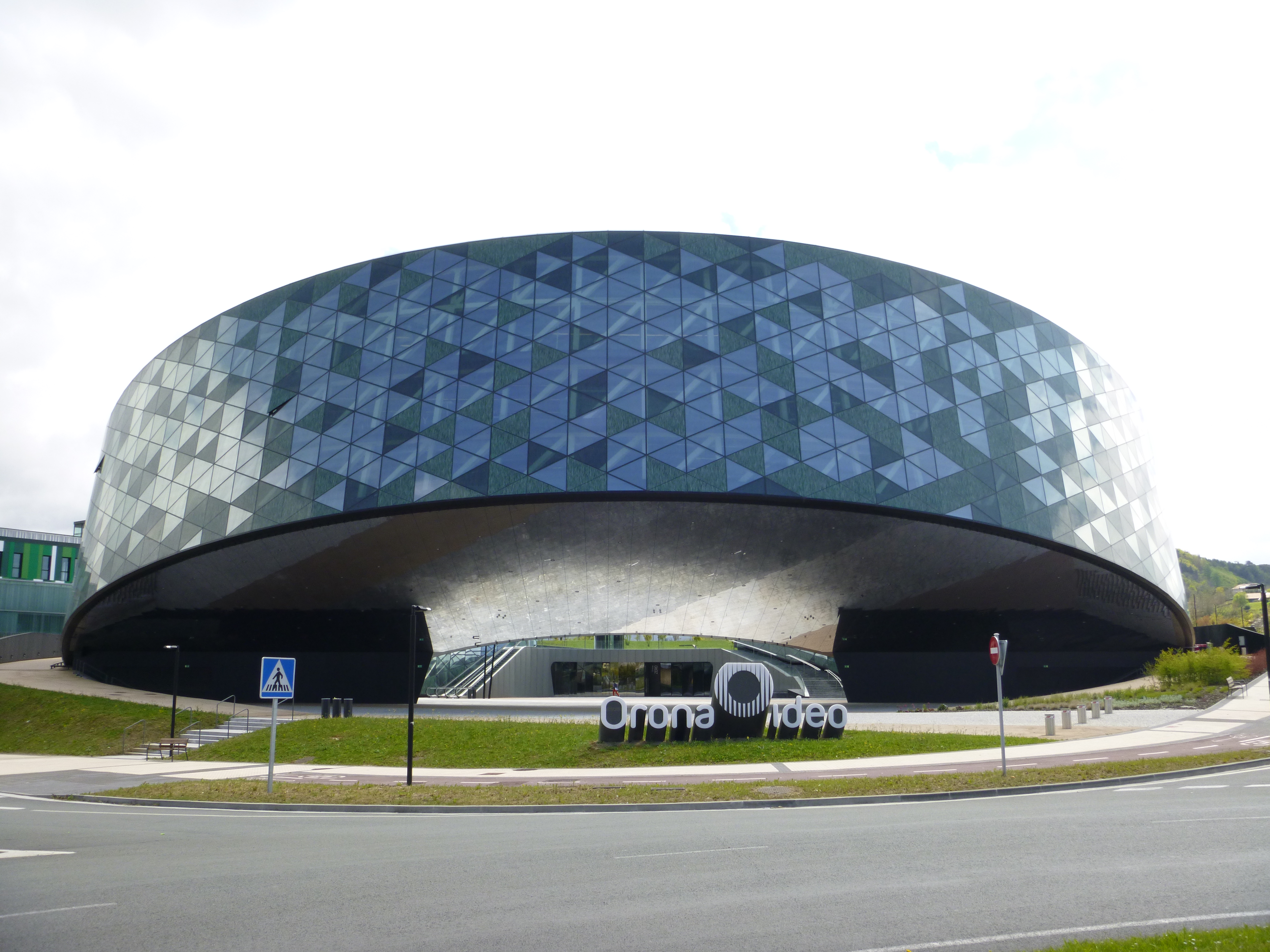
Technology center of the Orona cooperative.

1. In 1941 Arizmendiarrieta arrived in Mondragon with his ideology of the social doctrine of the church, where the worker finds satisfaction in his job as an intelligent and responsible human being. He began his career in the Locksmith Union Apprentice School and in Catholic Action, and at that time he wrote that the workers saw the church at the service of the state: "The Army, the clergy and the Falange (the fascist party in the Francoist Spain) are the three claws of the capitalist". Likewise, they saw the church on the side of the winners of the civil war. For this reason, he established a catalogue of three virtues for the priest who wanted to act in the working environment: freedom, austerity and diligence.
2. In 1956 he was about to be deported by the Civil Governor of Gipuzkoa, as he was considered the main person responsible for the workers' strikes of that year. Also, in 1965 and 1969, when students of the Professional School participated in the "Day of the Basque Homeland" (Aberri Eguna), the Governor accused the School of being a focus of politicization and subversion. And also in 1969, the Governor intended to "put the arrogant cooperativists of Mondragon under pressure and get them to surrender at his feet, engaged as they are in unspeakable and dangerous desires for emancipation, whose rebellious attitude could infect the rest of the Basque Country."
3. In 1960 the first criticisms from local and regional capitalist businessmen began, directly and also through the Official Chamber of Industry of Gipuzkoa, which was suspicious of the growth of the cooperatives. Arizmendiarrieta had an excellent relationship with many businessmen, whom he encouraged to become members of the Professional School, such as Juan Celaya from the Cegasa company in Oñati and José María Altuna from the JMA company in Mondragon. But the critics argued, on the one hand, that there was a transfer of workers from their companies to the new cooperatives, and, on the other, that the main reason for their growth were the fiscal benefits. The deduction of 10% of corporate tax was dedicated to the Promotion and Employment Fund for the community; this second argument was recurrent for many years.
4. In the cooperatives there were no trade unions, their functions being assumed by the Social Council, and in 1966 the first criticisms from leftist and union sectors began, maintaining that cooperativism was an insufficient solution for society, being socialism "from the inside". These critics accepted as positive certain aspects of cooperativism such as the democratic government of the company through the principle of one partner/one vote rather than control by capital, the imputation of the surplus value of work to the community, and solidarity through limited salary ranges that prevented the formation of privileged classes. But their principal objection was that cooperativism seemed to be a form of submission to the principles of the free market.
5. In 1970 other criticisms arose from the new Basque Left, linked to the various ETA groups, and their successive splits. They considered that a leading technocratic class had emerged in the cooperatives, directly including Arizmendiarrieta, who called himself a cooperativist but prevented the liberation of the Basque working class. And that, in fact, was one of the reasons why the Ministry of Labor in Madrid had distributed Medals of Merit for Labor to cooperative members. In 1972 there were controversies of this nature in Alecop and in the "Basque School" (Ikastola) of Mondragon. And in June 1974, a cooperative strike took place for the first time at the ULGOR and Fagor Electronic plants, as a result of new job evaluation regulations. After unpleasant incidents, the strike ended with the expulsion of 24 partners, approved in the General Assembly. Several years later they were given the option of readmission, which some of them accepted.

Cooperativism was also criticised for its lack of sensitivity to the Basque question.

== Influence and legacy ==
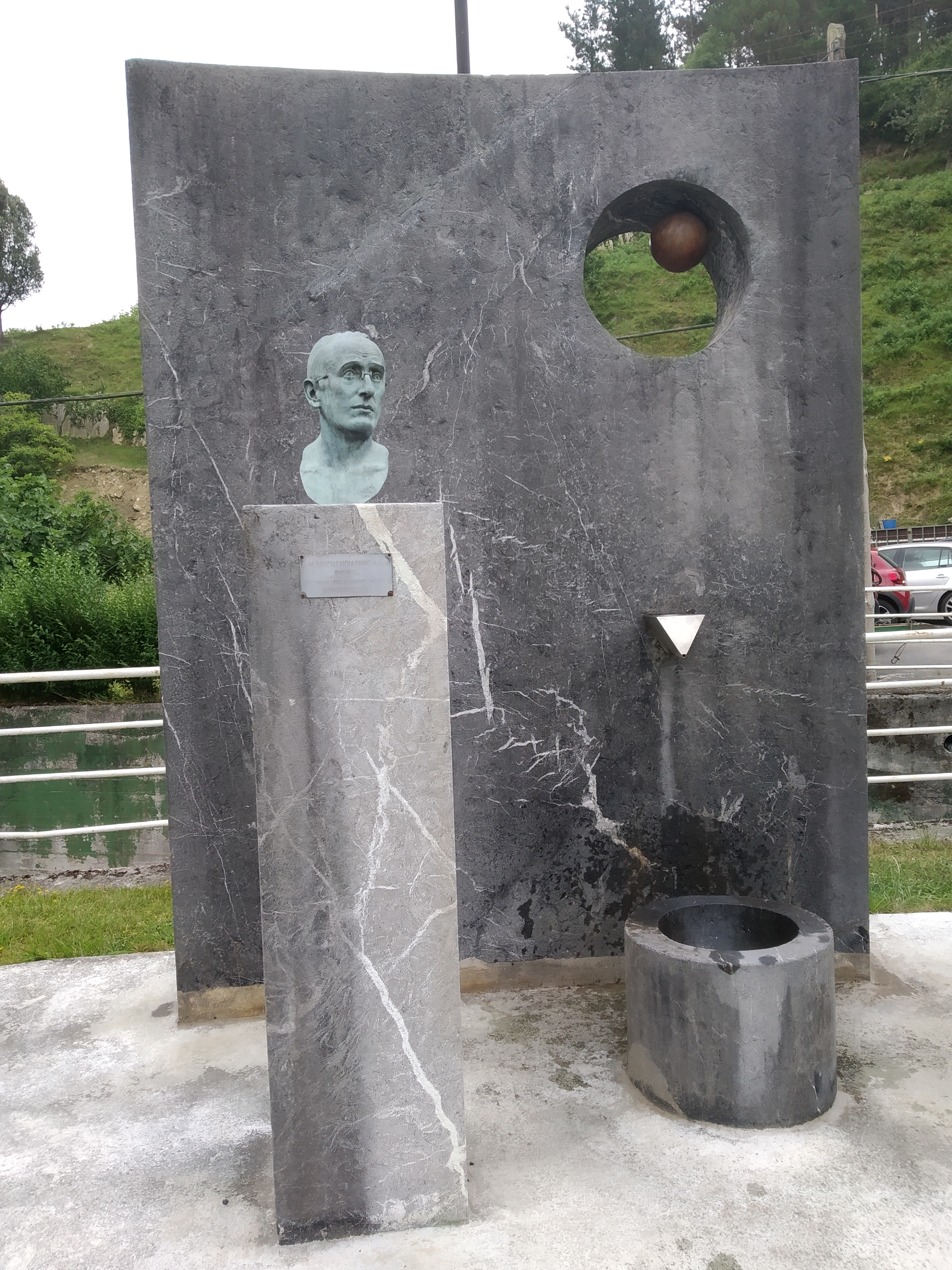
Memorial in honor of Jose Maria Arizmendiarrieta in the Barinaga district of Markina Xemein

- 1952: Commendation of the Civil Order of Alfonso X el Sabio from the Minister of Education, Mr. Ruiz Giménez, after the inauguration of the new Professional School.
- April 1966: Mondragon paid homage to three figures by naming them adoptive sons of the town: the doctor Don Mariano Briones, the parish priest Don Jose Luis Iñarra and Don Jose Maria Arizmendiarrieta. The three honorees were celebrating 25 years of work at Mondragon.
- August 1966: Gold Medal for Work awarded by the Minister of Labor, Romero Gorria, after the inauguration of the Alecoop Student Industrial Cooperative.
- 1972: opening of the Olandixo Hillside Road (where Lagun Aro, Ikerlan and Laboral Kutxa are located) which is called Paseo Jose Maria Arizmendiarrieta.
- 1992: a monument was inaugurated in his honor in the native district of Barinaga in Markina-Xemein.
- 1997: the Arizmendi Bakery opened in San Francisco, California, named after Arizmendiarrieta.
- 6 May 2009: the diocesan phase of his canonization process concluded.
- 14 December 2015: decreed to be of heroic virtue by Pope Francis and became venerable.
- April 2016, the Laubide Square in Mondragon was renamed the Jose Maria Arizmendiarrieta Square, with a plaque in Basque and Spanish inscribed “Jose Maria Arizmendiarrieta (1915–1976). Founder of Arrasate-Mondragon cooperativism. His model for work has spread across the world. Commemorating 100 years since his birth”.
