= Ada Byron Award =

Award for women in technology

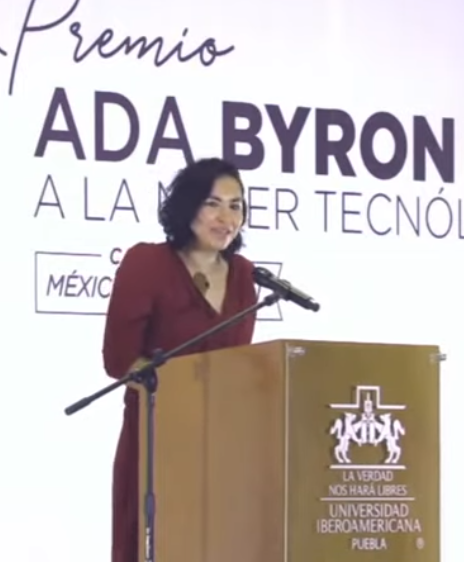
- Carolina Leyva Inzunza accepting the Mexican chapter's 2021 award
- Native name: Premio Ada Byron
- Awarded for: Women in technology
- Sponsored by: University of Deusto
- Country: Spain; Mexico (since 2019); Argentina (since 2020); Colombia (since 2021); Uruguay (since 2021); Chile (since 2022)
- Reward: €3,000
- Established: 2013
- First award: 2014
- Website: www.deusto.es/en/home/we-are-deusto/faculties/engineering/events-and-awards/ada-byron-award

The Ada Byron Award for Women in Technology (Premio Ada Byron a la Mujer Tecnóloga) is an honor given annually by the University of Deusto to recognize the careers of women in technology. It seeks out women scientists and technologists who have contributed to various scientific disciplines, such as Ada Byron, for whom the award is named.

== History ==
The Ada Byron Award for Women in Technology was established at the University of Deusto in October 2013.

Its first edition was presented on 11 April 2014, during the "Women and Technology" session at Forotech 2014, which was held as part of Deusto Engineering and Technology Week. The winner received a cash prize of €3,000.

In 2019 it expanded to Mexico, and in 2020 it reached Argentina through the Catholic University of Córdoba and the National Technological University.

In 2021 it arrived in Uruguay with the support of the Catholic University of Uruguay, and in Colombia with the Pontificia Universidad Javeriana.

Continuing with the internationalization of the award, in 2022, it was expanded to Chile, with the support of the Andrés Bello National University.

In 2023, the Ada Byron Award celebrated its tenth edition. To commemorate this milestone, a video was produced, featuring the winners from all previous editions.

== Goals ==
The award aims to:

- Give visibility to women within the world of technology by recognizing their important work, which is insufficiently known in society as a whole
- Enrich society with technology dissemination events, providing female role models for new generations
- Promote technological vocations by making technological work accessible to teenagers, highlighting the positive aspects, especially in female vocations
- Raise social awareness of the importance of technology for economic growth and as a future value for society
- Contribute to the realization of the UN's Sustainable Development Goal 5: "Achieve gender equality and empower all women and girls"

== Administrators and jurors ==
- Nerea Aranguren – director of innovation at Danobat and manager at Ideko
- Guillermo Dorronsoro – management board advisor, Zabala Innovation Consulting
- Miren Elgarresta – director of Emakunde-Basque Institute for Women
- Lorena Fernández Álvarez – director of digital communication at the University of Deusto
- Cristina Giménez Elorriaga – member of the Scientific-Technological Committee at the University of Deusto
- Sara Gómez Martín – director of the Women and Engineering Project at the Royal Academy of Engineering
- Mari Luz Guenaga Gómez – member of the Scientific-Technological Committee at the University of Deusto
- Teresa Laespada – deputy for employment, cohesion and equality in the General Assemblies of Biscay
- Idoia Maguregui Villalain – advisory board member, CIOnet
- Eva Ortega Paíno – Secretary General of Research at the Ministry of Science
- Manuel Salaverria – president of Innobasque
- María Cora Urdaneta Ponte – member of the Scientific-Technological Committee at the University of Deusto

== Winners ==
Edition	Year	Ada Byron Award	Ada Byron Youth Award	Runner-up
1st	2014	Montserrat Meya	-	Andrea Blanco
2nd	2015	Asunción Gómez Pérez	-	Begoña García-Zapirain
3rd	2016	Nuria Oliver	-	-
4th	2017	Regina Llopis Rivas	-	-
5th	2018	María Ángeles Martín Prats	-	-
6th	2019	Concha Monje	Ana Freire Veiga	-
7th	2020	Laura Lechuga	Susana Ladra	-
8th	2021	Elena García Armada	Jordina Torrents Barrena	-
9th	2022	Lourdes Verdes-Montenegro	Julia Guiomar Niso Galán	-
10th	2023	María José Escalona	Sara García Alonso	-
11th	2024	Patricia Horcajada	Alba González Álvarez	-

== See also ==
- Ada Lovelace Award
- BCS Lovelace Medal
