= Maria Marten (disambiguation) =

Maria Marten was a murder victim in Suffolk, England.

Maria Marten may also refer to:

- Maria Marten, or the Mystery of the Red Barn a 1913 silent British film directed by Maurice Elvey
- Maria Marten (1928 film), a silent British film directed by Walter West
- Maria Marten, or The Murder in the Red Barn, a 1935 film starring Tod Slaughter

== See also ==
- Maria Martin (disambiguation)
