= Gregorio Salvador Caja =

Spanish linguist (1927–2020)

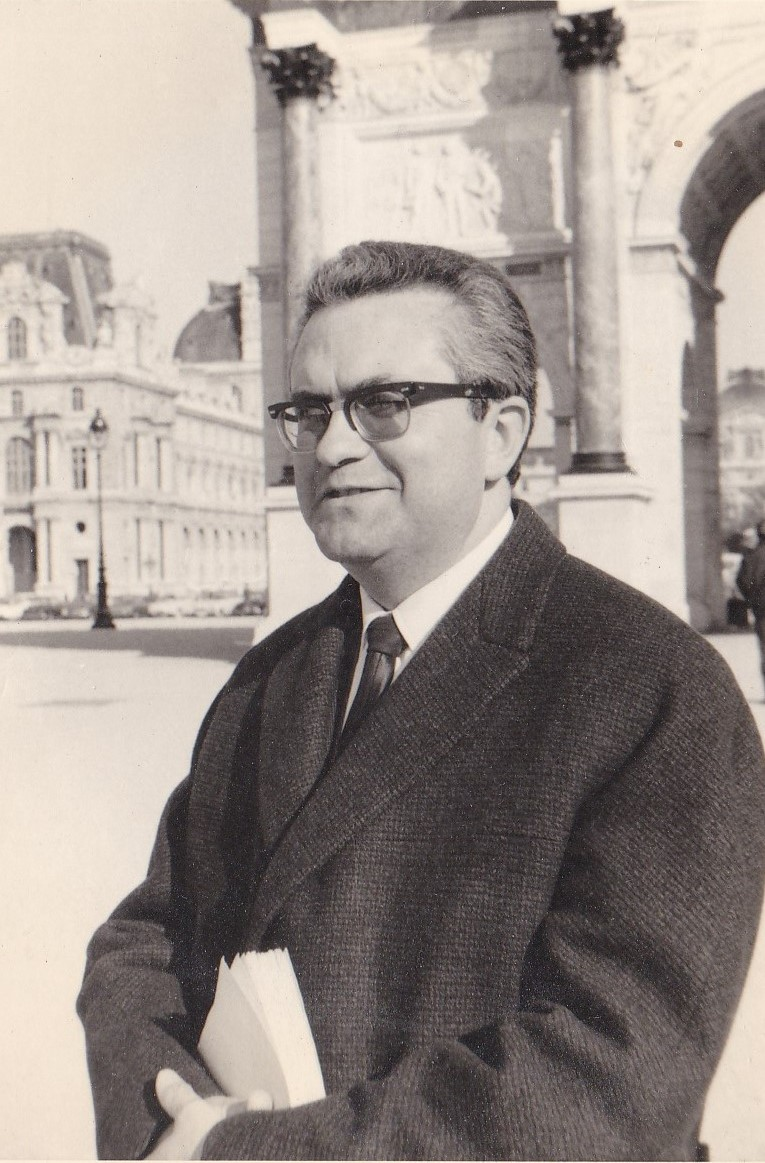
- Salvador in Paris, April 1968.
- Born: 11 July 1927; Cúllar (Granada), Spain
- Died: 26 December 2020 (aged 93); Madrid, Spain
- Education: Ph.D. Romance Philology
- Occupations: Linguist, author

Seat q of the Real Academia Española
- In office 15 February 1987 (Note: Elected on 5 June 1986) – 26 December 2020
- Preceded by: Seat established
- Succeeded by: Asunción Gómez Pérez

Gregorio Salvador Caja (11 July 1927 – 26 December 2020) was a Spanish linguist specialized in structural semantics. Salvador was born in Cúllar, Granada, and studied at the University of Granada and Complutense University. He was one of the most important disciples of Manuel Alvar. He wrote for the Spanish newspaper ABC.

Salvador was elected to Seat q of the Real Academia Española on 5 June 1986; he took up his seat on 15 February 1987.

Gregorio Salvador died in Madrid on 26 December 2020 at the age of 93.

== Selected works ==
- El habla de Cúllar-Baza: contribución al estudio de la frontera del andaluz (1958)
- Unidades fonológicas vocálicas en el andaluz oriental (1977)
- Las otras vocales andaluzas (Spanish Review of Linguistics, 1989)
- Semántica y Lexicología del Español (Madrid, Paraninfo, 1985)
- Estudios dialectológicos (Madrid, Paraninfo, 1987)
- Lengua española y lenguas de España (Ariel, 1987)
- Casualidades (Espasa-Calpe, 1994).
- Política lingüística y sentido común (Istmo, 1992)
- Un mundo con libros (Espasa-Calpe, 1995)
- La lengua española, hoy, in collaboration with Manuel Seco (Juan March Foundation, 1995)
- Historia de las letras, with Juan Ramón Lodares (Espasa-Calpe, 1996)
- Granada, recuerdos y retornos (Universidad de Granada, 1996)
- El eje del compás (Planeta, 2002). Novel
- El destrozo educativo (Grupo Unisón, Madrid. 2004)
- Nocturno londinense y otros relatos (Espasa-Calpe, 2006).
- El fútbol y la vida (2007)
- Estar a la que salte (Espasa-Calpe, 2007)

== Notes ==
Preceded by: (None)	q seat of the Spanish Royal Academy; 15 February 1987 – 26 December 2020	Succeeded by: TBD
Preceded by: Ángel Martín Municio	Vicedirector of the Spanish Royal Academy; 1999 - 2007	Succeeded by: José Antonio Pascual
