= Cúllar =

Cúllar, Spain
- Coat of arms

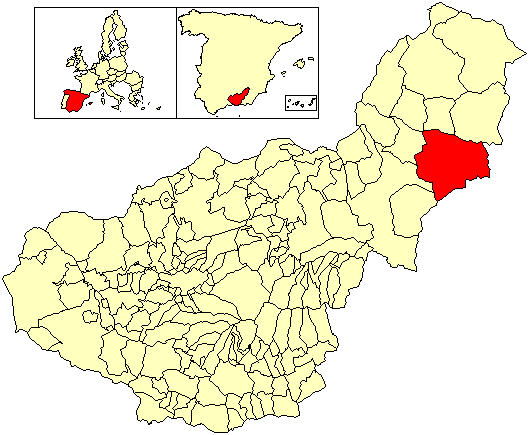
- Location of Cúllar
- Coordinates: 37°35′N 2°34′W
- Country: Spain
- Province: Granada
- Municipality: Cúllar

Area
  - Total: 427 km^{2} (165 sq mi)
- Elevation: 897 m (2,943 ft)

Population (2025-01-01)
  - Total: 3,978
  - Density: 9.32/km^{2} (24.1/sq mi)
- Time zone: UTC+1 (CET)
  - Summer (DST): UTC+2 (CEST)

Cúllar is a municipality located in the province of Granada, Spain. According to the 2005 census (INE), the town had a population of 4,898 inhabitants.

A square is named after the linguist Gregorio Salvador Caja, one of the most famous personalities of the town.

== See also ==
- List of municipalities in Granada
