= Networks in labor economics =

Networks in labor economics refers to the effect social networks have on jobseekers obtaining employment. Research suggests that around half of the employed workforce found their jobs through social contacts. It is believed that social networks not only contribute to the efficiency of job searching but can also explain, at least partly, wage differences and other inequalities in the workforce. Various models are used to quantify this effect, all having their own strengths and weaknesses. Models generally have to simplify the complex nature of social networks.

== The model of Calvo-Armegnol and Jackson ==
In some economic models, the role of social networks in job searching often use exogenous job networks. Using this framework, Calvo-Armegnol and Jackson were able to point out some network related labor market issues.

=== The model ===
In their basic model, in which they attempt to formalize the transmission of job information among individuals, the agents can be either employed with some non-zero, or unemployed with zero wages. The agents can get information about a job, and when they do so, they can decide whether to keep that information for themselves or pass it to their contacts. In the other phase, employed agents can lose their job with a given probability.

=== Implications ===
Important indication of their model is that if someone who is employed has the information about a job, she will pass it to her unemployed acquaintances who will then become employed. Therefore, there is a positive correlation between labor outcomes of an individual and her contacts. On the other hand, it can also give an explanation for long term unemployment. If someone's acquaintances are unemployed as well, she has less chance to hear of some job opportunity. They also conclude that different initial wage and employment can cause different drop-outs rates from the labor market, thus, it can explain the existence of wage inequalities across social groups. Calvo-Armengol and Jackson prove that position in the network, and structure of the network affect the probability of being unemployed as well.

== Referral based job search ==
The effectiveness of job searching with personal contacts is the consequence not only the individuals’ but the employers’ behavior as well. They often choose to hire acquaintances of their current employees instead of using a bigger pool of applicants. It is due to the information asymmetry, as they hardly know anything about the productivity of the applicant, and revealing it would be rather time-consuming and expensive. However, employees might be aware both their contacts unobserved characteristics and the specific expectations of employers, so they can improve this imbalance. Another benefit for the firm is that, due to the personal bond, present employees are motivated to choose a candidate who will perform well, since after the recommendation, their reputation is also at stake.

Dustman, Glitz and Schönberg showed that using personal connections in job search increases the initial wage and decreases the probability of leaving the firm.

Referral based job networks can function even if there is no direct link between the referee and the potential worker. In the model of Finneran and Kelly, there is a hierarchical network in which workers have the opportunity to refer their acquaintances if their employer hires. Workers are referred for a job with some increasing probability regarding their ability and productivity. In a hierarchical model like this, workers who work at a lower level, far from the information, never get an offer. However, the authors have shown that there is a threshold of this referral probability over which even those skilled worker can be referred who are low in the hierarchy. So there is a critical density of referral linkages that exists, under which no qualified workers can be referred; however, if the density of these linkages is high enough, all qualified workers will match with a job, despite their position in the network.
