= Metal furniture =

Furniture that uses metal parts in its construction

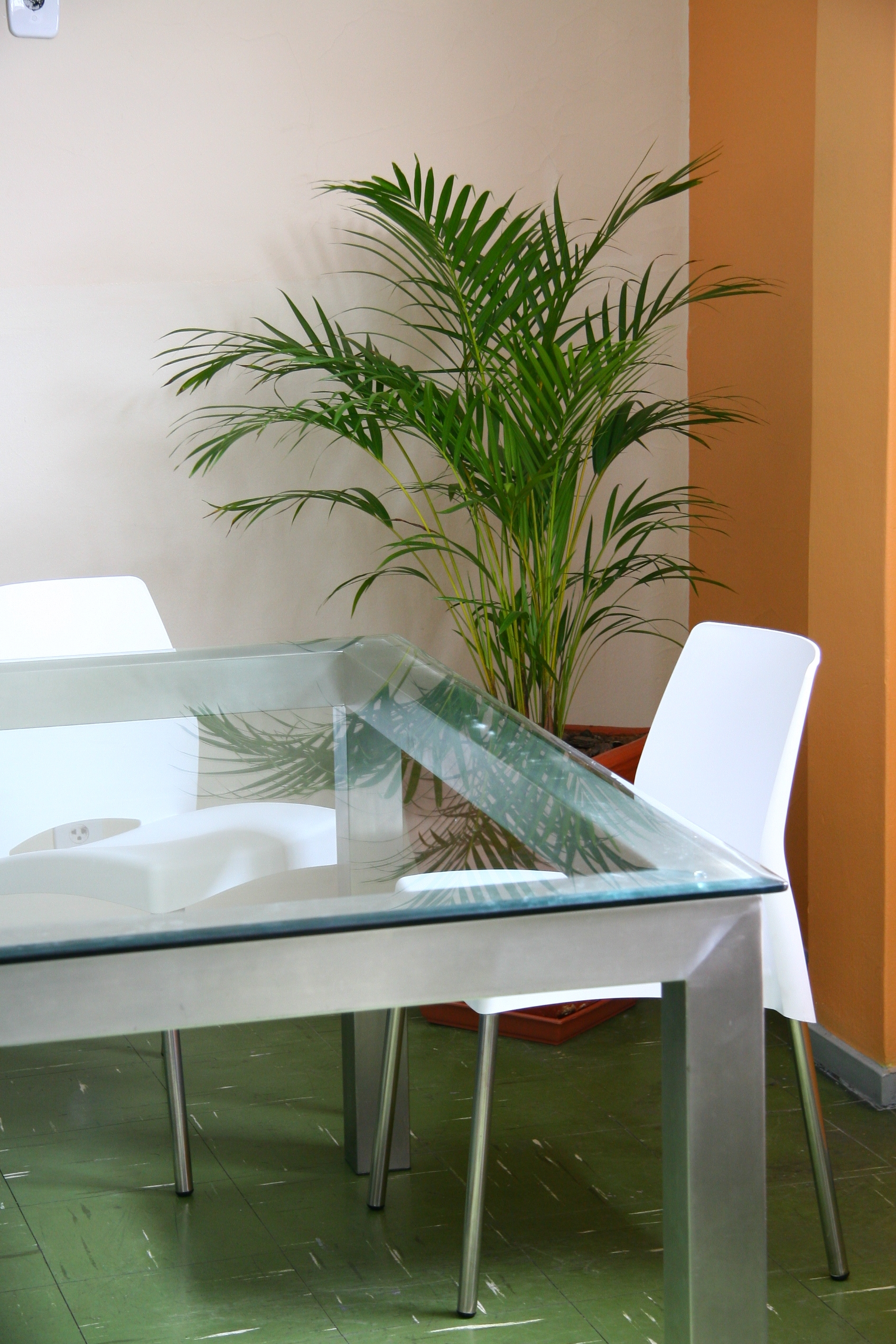
Stainless steel table with glass plate top. The chairs are polypropylene composite plastic with stainless steel legs

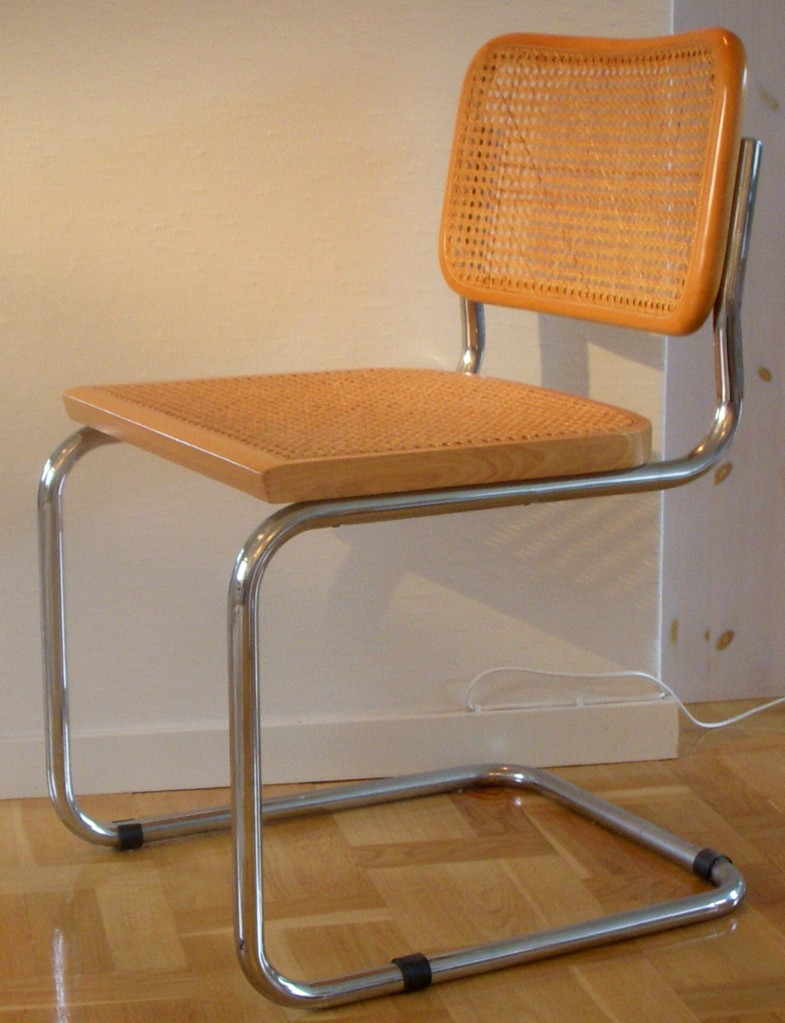

Metal furniture is furniture made with metal parts: iron, carbon steel, aluminium, brass and stainless steel.

Iron and steel products are extensively used in many application, ranging from office furnishings to outdoor settings.

Cast iron is used mainly for outdoor finishings and settings, such as those used for bench legs and solid iron tables. It is suited to outdoor use due to its hardness, heaviness and general tough composition. The main disadvantage to this is that it, being a relatively pure form of iron is subject to corrosion at the hands of the moisture and air.

Stainless steel is used extensively for most modern interior furnishings involving metal. Many hinges, slides, supports and body pieces are composed of stainless. It has a high tensile strength, allowing it to be applied using hollow tubes, reducing weight and increasing user accessibility.

Aluminum is light and corrosion-resistant; it is heavily utilized for stamped and cast furniture, especially for molded chairs.

Metal furniture is a popular choice of furnishings, especially used outdoors for decks and patios. However, metal furniture can also be used indoors, such as brass beds, brass tables, iron bakers racks and metal curio cabinets.

== History ==
Around 1840, Janes, Beebe & Co. produced one of the earliest products of mass-produced cast-iron seating in America, an example of which is held by the Smithsonian Institution as inv. no. 1980.006

Steel indoor and outdoor furniture has been popular in the US since the '20s. Around 1925, Marcel Breuer, the Bauhaus furniture designer and architect, began working with tubular steel, having been impressed with the light weight and strength of the handlebars of a bicycle. The resulting furniture designs by Breuer and others using this material are some of the most important of the period.

In the United States during the 1930s, designers such as Gilbert Rohde and Wolfgang Hoffman specialized in indoor tubular chrome plated furniture, while Warren McArthur was the preeminent maker of high-end aluminum tubular furniture. But production of metal furniture came to a sudden halt when the United States entered World War II and factories began churning out products supporting the war effort.

After the war ended, those same factories necessarily switched to making products for peacetime pursuits. Arvin Industries, for example, began production of metal lawn furniture and dinette sets in 1940 and stopped it by the end of 1941 when the US entered the war.

When the war ended, a new consumer society developed, and Arvin began producing products for the home such as electric irons and ironing boards, waffle makers, radios and, by 1949, its first television set. It also began once again to manufacture outdoor steel furniture. By the 1950s, in addition to tubular steel, furniture was produced using aluminum, wire mesh and legs made of thin steel rods that give mid-century furniture its distinctive splayed leg, light-on-its-feet look.

== Benefits ==
Durability is the main advantage of metal furniture. For example, not many types of non-metal furniture can remain outside during winter and still look good when spring arrives. If cared for properly, metal furniture can last up to 30 years. Because most metal furniture is treated for rust and heat resistance, it does not need much maintenance.

== Types of metals ==
Usually metal furniture is made from either steel or aluminum.

Steel furniture is typically more expensive when it is used as furniture, with the price varying according to the type of metal and thickness. However, it is hard to identify it after a finish is applied. Steel has low, medium or high carbon, with most metal furniture being made with low carbon because it is cheaper. Stainless steel is good for low maintenance.

Wrought iron is used for garden furniture. It is heavy, which is useful on windy days. It needs much care, and can easily rust and corrode if not waterproofed. Aluminum is more common than steel furniture, mostly because it does not rust, although it oxidizes, turning into a chalky white. It is also lighter than steel. Cast and heavy tube aluminum give better quality. Aluminum has to be thicker than steel if it is to have as much strength. Tubular aluminum is flexible and less sturdy. However, its lightness makes for an ideal poolside furniture and is mainly used for benches, folding chairs and swing sets.

== Types of finishes ==
Choosing the right finish for metal furniture is important because of its durability. Some of the most common finishes include chrome plating, PVDF, plastic, painted, brass and anodized finishes. Chrome plating, although durable, is thin and if damaged where it is exposed to air, scratches can rust. Plastic-coated finishes are synthetically made and good as they prevent rusting or the metal changing color from air exposure. Although they're as strong as paint finishes, they do not hold up as well as electroplated finishes. Paint finishes are for both steel and aluminum furniture, although it easily scratches and rusts. Brass plating, which is an electroplated finish, is applied in a bath and is durable. Solid brass is both pricey and rare. To decide if a finish is solid brass put a magnet on the furniture and if it clings, it is made of brass-plated steel (iron in the steel is magnetic). Brass is made from copper and zinc, two metals that are prone to corrosion from exposure to (salty) water or air. Brass finishes should be oiled or clear-coated with polyurethane or a similar material to make a barrier from air and water to prevent corrosion. Corrosion is slowed when a surface is already oxidized, for example aluminum is very hard to weld because of its persistent aluminum oxide layer, this prevents access to the bare metal. Anodized finishes are used on aluminum furniture to increase the thickness of the aluminum oxide layer, creating a thicker barrier between the atmosphere and aluminum base metal.

== Considerations ==
When selecting metal furniture, consider coat and finish, ensuring the surface is either powder coated or electroplated. Depending on climate, different treatments may be appropriate. For example, in rainy areas, furniture should be waterproof and light enough to carry indoors.
