= Maria Martins =

Maria Martins may refer to:

- Maria Martins (athlete), French middle distance runner
- Maria Martins (artist), Brazilian visual artist
- Maria Martins (cyclist), Portuguese racing cyclist
- Maria de Lourdes Martins, Portuguese pianist and composer
- Maria Eugénia Martins de Nazaré Ribeiro, Portuguese judge
- Maria Amélia Martins-Loução, biologist and professor
