= María Martín (politician) =

Spanish politician (1973–2002)

María Martín Alonso (21 February 1973 – 24 May 2002) was a Spanish politician of the People's Party of Galicia (PPdeG).

Born in Moaña, Province of Pontevedra, Martín graduated in Business Sciences from the University of Santiago de Compostela. She became the councillor in charge of sports in her hometown, as well as deputy mayor to Alberto Currás. She was president of the New Generations branch in her town. She was 11th on the PPdeG list for the Parliament of Galicia in her province in the 2001 Galician regional election, and was elected. She was the vice president of the Parliamentary Commission on Infrastructure.

At the age of 29, Martín was driving to parliament in Santiago de Compostela on the A-9 when she lost control of her Citroën Xsara Picasso at Valga. The impact ejected her from the vehicle, and she was killed instantly by a bus. Her funeral was held in Moaña and she was buried in nearby Marín.

In September 2009, Martín was one of three women who had streets named after them in Moaña.
