= María Ángeles Martín Prats =

Spanish engineer and entrepreneur (born 1971)

- Born: 7 February 1971 (age 55); Seville, Spain
- Education: University of Seville
- Occupations: Engineer, entrepreneur
- Employer: University of Seville
- Organizations: IEEE; PEGASUS
- Awards: Order of Civil Merit (2015); Ada Byron Award (2018)

María Ángeles Martín Prats (born 7 February 1971) is a Spanish engineer and entrepreneur. She is the director of aeronautical research within the University of Seville's ICT-109 Electronic Technology Group, a Senior Member of the Institute of Electrical and Electronics Engineers (IEEE), and founder of the spin-off Skylife Engineering. She is a board member of the Partnership of a European Group of Aeronautics and Space Universities (PEGASUS), and is the European university coordinator of the European Defence Agency (EDA). She is also a member of the Scientific Committee of the European Commission's Clean Sky Joint Undertaking. In 2015, she was granted the Order of Civil Merit by King Felipe VI, and in 2018 she received the Ada Byron Award from the University of Deusto.

== Career ==
María Ángeles Martín Prats holds PhDs in physics and electronic engineering from the University of Seville. She is an associate professor and researcher at its Department of Electronic Engineering, where she directs the aeronautical research line within the TIC-109 Electronic Technology Group. She has held a large number of positions in the aeronautics sector, based primarily on power electronics, avionics, and electronic systems, for which she has been recognized as an IEEE Senior Member since 2011. As of 2018, she has participated in over 70 industrial and research projects, and has been responsible for 42 aeronautical projects with technology transfer to the industry. She has numerous publications on her research and projects.

She was chosen by the Global Engineering Deans Council (GEDC) to head their effort to attract women students to STEM disciplines. In five years, the number of women studying air navigation in Seville increased from 15 to 60 percent.

From January 2006 to July 2011, Martín was president of the Spanish chapter of IEEE Women in Engineering. In addition, from June 2009 to June 2012, she was president of the Spanish chapter of the IEEE Aerospace and Electronic Systems Society.

In 2011, she founded the spin-off Skylife Engineering in Seville. In 2012, it received the Emprendedor XXI award from the Regional Government of Andalusia, which is given to encourage and recognize the development of innovative new companies and identify those that have the greatest growth potential.

Since 2008, Martín has been coordinator of the PEGASUS European aerospace excellence network of the University of Seville's Higher Technical School of Engineering. In addition, since April 2011 she has been a member of the PEGASUS board, serving as vice president of the PEGASUS Network for the term April 2013 to April 2015.

She was a world finalist for the 2013 Airbus GEDC Diversity Award. She was also chosen by the web portal Mujeres & Cía as one of the top 100 most influential women in Spain in 2014, 2015, and 2018, as well as one of the 10 most influential in the Academics and Researchers category.

Since February 2015, she has been the Higher Technical School of Engineering's deputy director of foreign relations. Since 2017, she has been the EDA's European university coordinator, and a member of the European Commission's Clean Sky Joint Undertaking. Since 2018, she has been a member of the latter's Scientific Committee.

On 19 June 2015, Martín received the Order of Civil Merit from King Felipe VI. In April 2018, the University of Deusto's Faculty of Engineering granted her the Ada Byron Woman Technologist Award.

== Awards and recognitions ==
- Mujeres & Cía Top 100 Most Influential Women in Spain, 2014, 2015, and 2018
- Association of Businesswomen and Professionals of Valencia Award, 2014
- Cortes de Cádiz Ibero-American Award, 2015
- Order of Civil Merit, 2015
- Ada Byron Award, 2018
