= Danobat =

Spanish machine tool company

Danobat S. Coop.
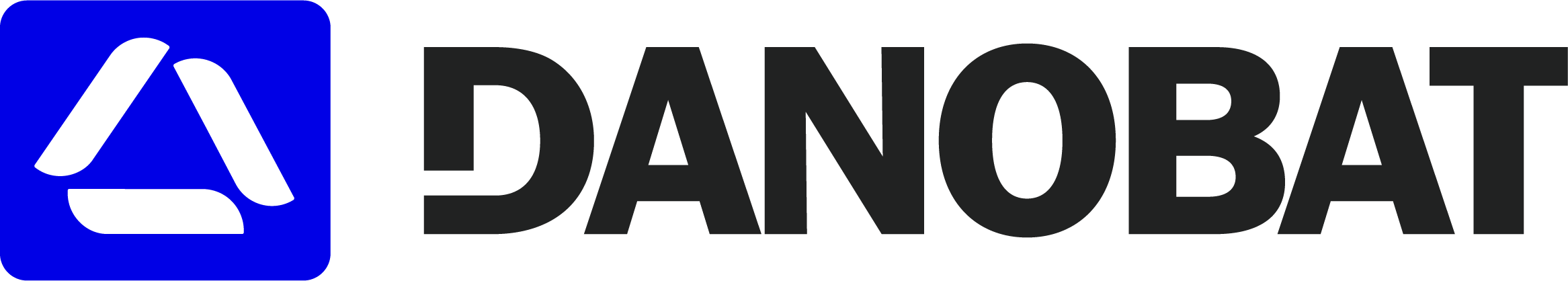

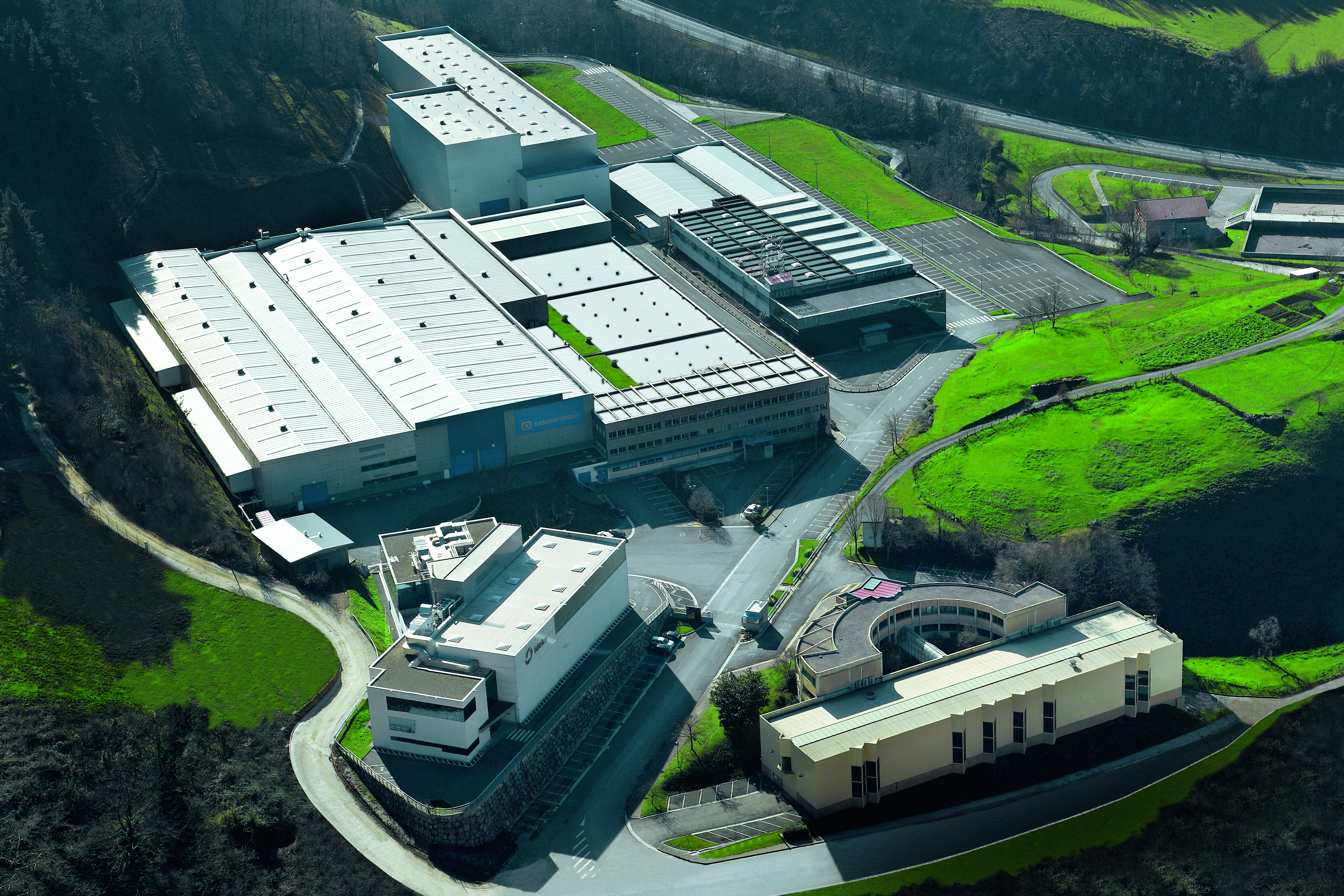
- DANOBAT's main plant in the town of Elgoibar
- Company type: Cooperative
- Industry: Machine tool
- Founded: 1954; 72 years ago
- Headquarters: Elgoibar, Guipúzcoa, Spain
- Number of employees: 600
- Website: www.danobat.com

Danobat is a Spanish cooperative company that is focused on the manufacturing of grinding machines and lathes. It is located in the town of Elgoibar in the province of Gipuzkoa in the Basque Country in Spain.

It is one of Europe's leading machine tool manufacturers, employs more than 600 people and has an annual turnover of around 130 million euros. The name Danobat is a contraction of the Basque words danok and bat, translatable as "All One".

Danobat was founded in the industrial town of Elgoibar in 1954, by 2013, the company's employees are spread out over all branches worldwide. Danobat, part of the industrial branch of the Mondragon Corporation, has a 65-year track record in the development of high-precision grinding machines and lathes and invests 8–10% of its income in innovation.

== History ==
- 1954: Danobat was set up with the aim of offering external grinding operations.
- 1956: Founding of Construcciones Mecánicas Eguzki.
- 1962: Founding of the company Acme-Deva.
- 1969: Merger of Danobat, Eguzki and Acme-Deva under the name of Danobat S. Coop.
- 1983: Founding of the Debako Group by the companies Danobat, Soraluce, Goiti and Txurtxil.
- 1992: Founding of Danobatgroup as a strategic group in the sector and a continuation of the Debako Group; inclusion in the Mondragon Cooperative Corporation, within the industrial division.
- 1992–1997: Danobatgroup set up new sales and service offices in China, Germany, France, Japan, Italy, US and Brazil.
- 2002: Acquisition of the German company Overbeck.
- 2003: Acquisition of the British company Newall.
- 2008: Merger of cooperatives Danobat and Lealde.
- 2011: Merger of cooperatives Danobat and Estarta Rectificadora.
- 2012: The cooperatives Danobat Railway Systems and Dano-Rail merge.
- 2013: Danobat Railway Systems becomes part of Danobat.
- 2014: Start of joint venture between Danobat and the American company Marathon.
- 2015: Acquisition of the company Plantool OY by Danobat.
- 2019: Acquisition of Hembrug Machine Tools

== Ownership ==
All workers are owners of the organization under equal conditions, on the basis of one-member, one-vote in the General Assembly. The member workers form part of the executive body of Danobat (Board of Management and General Assembly) on an equal basis and participate in decision-making and management. Membership of the executive bodies is renewed every four years.

== Locations ==
Danobat has a strong international presence with production plants and service centres in Spain, Germany, the Netherlands, Italy, the United Kingdom and the United States, as well as a sales and service network covering 40 countries.

== Environmental management ==
With the support of Ihobe and Invema, in 2001 an ISO team was set up with other companies from the Danobat Group and MCC to achieve ISO 14001 certification in May 2002. The same year, Danobat was included in the Eco-Management and Audit Scheme (EMAS) register. The AENOR audits in May 2003 were successful and the Regional Ministry of Environment of the Basque Government granted the EMAS registration7 in October 2003.
