= Jill Stein 2012 presidential campaign =

American political campaign

Jill Stein 2012
- Campaign: 2012 United States presidential election
- Candidate: Jill Stein; Former member of the Lexington; Town Meeting from the 2nd district (2005–2011); Cheri Honkala; Political and social activist
- Affiliation: Green Party
- Status: Announced candidacy: October 24, 2011; Presumptive nominee: June 2012; Official nominee: July 14, 2012; Lost election: November 6, 2012
- Key people: Cheri Honkala (Running mate); Ben Manski (Campaign manager)
- Receipts: US$893,636 (October 17, 2012)
- Slogan: A Green New Deal for America

Website
- Jill Stein 2012 (archived - November 5, 2012)

The 2012 presidential campaign of Jill Stein was announced on October 24, 2011. Jill Stein, a physician from Massachusetts, gave indication in August 2011 that she was considering running for President of the United States with the Green Party in the 2012 national election. She wrote in a published questionnaire that she had been asked to run by a number of Green activists and felt compelled to consider the possibility after the U.S. debt-ceiling crisis which she called "the President's astounding attack on Social Security, Medicare and Medicaid – a betrayal of the public interest."

Stein received the presidential nomination of Green Party at its nominating convention in Baltimore on July 14, 2012. The campaign received enough contributions to qualify for primary season federal matching funds from the Federal Election Commission, and on July 11, 2012, Stein selected anti-poverty activist Cheri Honkala as her running mate for the Green vice-presidential nomination.

== Campaign developments ==
=== Announcement ===
In a survey conducted in September 2011, Stein suggested that she would announce her intentions by the end of that month and later stated that she would announce her intentions in October. On October 24, 2011, Stein launched her campaign at a press conference in Massachusetts, saying: "We are all realizing that we, the people, have to take charge because the political parties that are serving the top 1 percent are not going to solve the problems that the rest of us face, we need people in Washington who will refuse to be bought by lobbyists and for whom change is not just a slogan".

Stein's decision to enter the presidential race stemmed from a mock election at Western Illinois University where she fared well. The mock election featured the Green ticket of Stein/Mesplay, the Democratic ticket of Obama/Biden and the Republican ticket of Romney/Ryan, with Stein receiving 27% of votes, Romney 33% and Obama 39%. Encouraged by this success, she decided to run. During an interview with Grist Magazine, Stein said:

If I can quote Alice Walker, 'The biggest way people give up power is by not knowing they have it to start with.' And that's true, for the environmental movement, the student movement, the antiwar movement, health-care-as-a-human-right movement — you put us all together, we have the potential for a Tahrir Square type event, and [to] turn the White House into a Green House in November.

=== Campaign staff ===
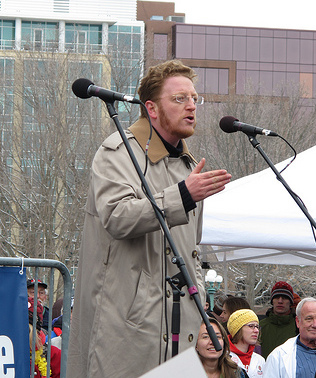
Campaign manager Ben Manski at Wisconsin Wave Rally, 2011

In December 2011, Wisconsin Green Party leader Ben Manski was announced as Stein's campaign manager.

=== Nomination ===
Stein became the presumptive Green Party nominee after winning two-thirds of California's delegates in June 2012. In a statement following the California election, Stein said, "Voters will not be forced to choose between two servants of Wall Street in the upcoming election. Now we know there will be a third candidate on the ballot who is a genuine champion of working people."

Stein won the presidential nomination of Green Party on July 14, 2012, at its nominating convention in Baltimore.

=== Matching federal funds ===
On July 1, 2012, the Jill Stein campaign reported it had received enough contributions to qualify for primary season federal matching funds from the Federal Election Commission, making Stein the second Green Party presidential candidate ever to have qualified, with Ralph Nader being the first in 2000.

=== Vice-presidential running mate selection ===
On July 11, 2012, Stein selected anti-poverty activist Cheri Honkala as her running mate for the Green vice-presidential nomination.

Shortly the selection was made, Stein's campaign manager Ben Manski had said Barr's shortlist for running mates had included Roseanne Barr, her chief opponent in the party's primaries.

=== Campaign events ===
On August 1, 2012, Stein, Honkala and three others were arrested during a sit-in at a Philadelphia bank to protest housing foreclosures on behalf of several city residents struggling to keep their homes. Stein explained her willingness to be arrested:

The developers and financiers made trillions of dollars through the housing bubble and the imposition of crushing debt on homeowners. And when homeowners could no longer pay them what they demanded, they went to government and got trillions of dollars of bailouts. Every effort of the Obama Administration has been to prop this system up and keep it going at taxpayer expense. It's time for this game to end. It's time for the laws be written to protect the victims and not the perpetrators.

On September 7, 2012, Stein was a guest of Bill Moyers for the program Moyers & Company, "Challenging Power, Changing Politics", along with Cheri Honkala and Vermont Senator Bernie Sanders. The program centered on the role of money in politics, the Wall St. Bailout and potential solutions, such as reversing Citizen's United. Senator Sanders stated, "Fraud is the business model for Wall Street." Jill Stein also described her decision to run for president, problems with the current administration, and aspects of her platform, such as how to fund her Green New Deal:

Why should Wall Street be exempt from a sales tax? If you put a small sales tax on Wall Street transactions you not only generate hundreds of billions of dollars a year which could fund our Green New Deal, but you also rein in this reckless speculation in gambling on Wall Street which is a good thing all around.

In early September 2012, at the height of the Democratic National Convention, the Stein campaign ran their first national television ad campaigns. Google TV attempted to block the "Enough!" ad from airing, claiming that the use of an (partly bleeped) obscenity violated TV indecency rules and was "inappropriate language". The Stein campaign argued that the ads already complied with Federal Communications Commission regulations regarding appropriate content. Google eventually reversed their position, and ran the ads, but the controversy drew attention to the campaign and the ads themselves.

On September 2, Stein spoke before two hundred medical marijuana proponents in Deering Oaks Park in Portland, Maine. Stein said that "As a medical doctor and a public health advocate, marijuana, cannabis is a substance which is dangerous because it's illegal. It's not illegal because it's dangerous,".

On September 8, 2012, Jill Stein campaigned in Oregon, where neither Romney nor Obama campaigned in person, and spoke at a popular pro-marijuana, pro-hemp festival, Hempstalk 2012. Stein voiced support for Oregon's Measure 80, on the November ballot, that would legalize marijuana use for adults, regulate and tax it, and lift restrictions on using industrial hemp in clothing and other products. Stein stated, "Poor people are being thrown into prison for the recreational use of a substance that is not dangerous, and that is a crime."

Throughout September 2012 Stein made further appearances in various parts of the country. Stein made appearances during the "Poverty Tour 2.0" which was headed by Tavis Smiley and Cornel West. Poverty Tour was designed to bring to light the plight of those suffering from poverty in the United States. On September 13, Stein joined the picket line of the Chicago Teachers Strike. On September 15, Stein gave a speech at Fighting Bob Fest in Madison, Wisconsin. Stein joined protesters and addressed the crowds during the one-year anniversary of Occupy Wall Street on September 17.

On September 20, 2012, Jill Stein appeared on The Big Picture with Thom Hartmann where she talked about the need of third parties in the United States. The Jill Stein campaign announced a competition on September 24 that offered a free dinner with Time writer Joel Stein (no relation) to those who donated $3 to the campaign. Stein ended September with an appearance on C-SPAN's Washington Journal where she talked about her candidacy, the Green Party, and third parties.

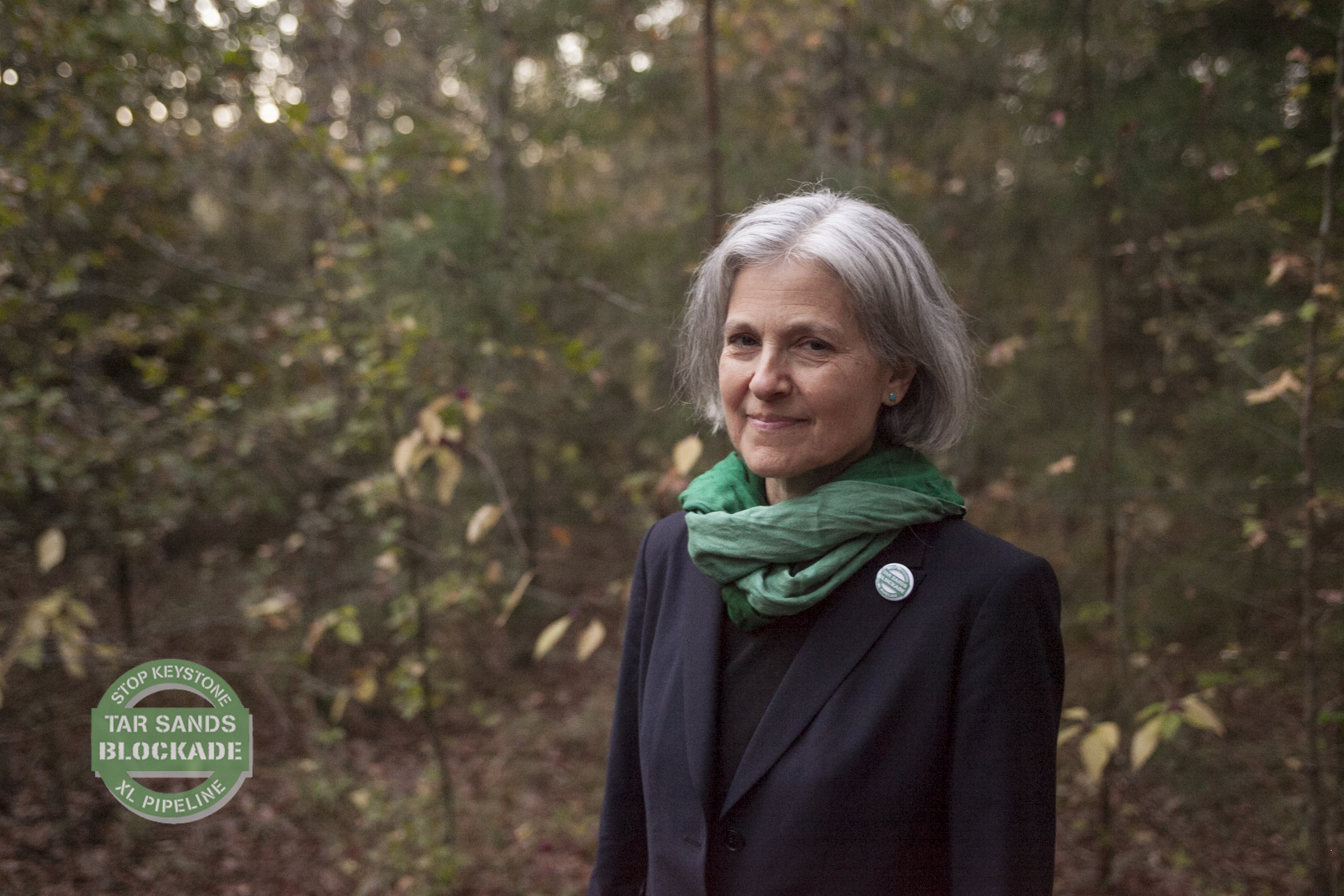
Oct. 31, 2012, Dr. Stein was arrested in Texas while opposing the Keystone XL Pipeline

In Denver on October 3, the date of the first presidential debate, Stein and Occupy Denver marched in protest of third parties being left out of the debate. During the debate, Stein appeared on Democracy Now! to offer her own responses to the questions asked. After the debate, Stein and Honkala hosted an "After the Debate Party" at the Mercury Cafe in Denver where they addressed the crowd about the debate and the campaign.

On October 11, Stein made an appearance at the American Islamic Congress. On October 16, 2012, Stein and vice-presidential nominee Cheri Honkala were arrested for disorderly conduct while trying to take part in the second presidential debate at Hofstra University in Hempstead, New York. The two women claim they were taken to a warehouse, and strapped for eight hours to chairs with plastic wrist restraints before being released.

On October 18, Stein appeared on The Brian Lehrer Show and later that same day debated Gary Johnson in an online debate hosted by the Independent Voter Network and streamed online by Google+ and Blog Talk Radio. Stein joined fellow third-party presidential candidates Gary Johnson, Virgil Goode, and Rocky Anderson at the Hilton Chicago for a debate sponsored by the Free and Equal Elections Foundation on October 23. Veteran broadcaster Larry King served as moderator for the debate and the debate was streamed live by Russia Today and broadcast live by Al Jazeera English.

On October 31, Stein was arrested in Texas for criminal trespass after trying to deliver food and supplies to the XL Pipeline protesters. The next day, on November 1, an interview with Stein was featured on MTV.com. Also on November 1 the Stein campaign released their second television commercial. Stein appeared with Rocky Anderson on Truthdig Radio on KPFK on November 2 for an interview about alternative candidates and the state of the presidential race.

November 4, Stein joined Gary Johnson, Rocky Anderson, and Virgil Goode for a debate moderated by Ralph Nader at Busboys and Poets in Washington, D.C. On November 5, Stein debated Gary Johnson for a final time at a debate at RTAmerica's studios in Washington DC. The final debate was streamed live by Free Speech TV, Stitcher Radio, Orion Radio, Reciva, YES! Magazine, Next News Network, RTAmerica, American Free Press, C-SPAN, and Al Jazeera English.

=== Political positions ===
Other than the centerpiece of her campaign, modeled after the New Deal which was called the Green New Deal, Stein has a number of other positions which included nationalization of the Federal Reserve and placing them under the authority of the Department of the Treasury, having a full employment program, the renegotiation of "NAFTA and other "free trade agreements," turning the minimum wage into a living wage, ending corporate welfare, making "heat, electricity, phone, internet, and public transportation ... democratically run, publicly owned utilities that operate at cost, not for profit," having a 90% on the bonuses collected by bankers that were bailed out, break up too big to fail banks, and stopping private banks from creating Federal Reserve Notes. Some of her other views included letting pension funds be controlled by workers democratically, establishing "federal, state, and municipal publicly owned banks," free secondary and higher education, supporting local, healthy food, putting in place a moratorium on future foreclosures, stopping hydraulic fracturing, making a grid to provide energy democratically, repealing the Patriot Act and parts of the National Defense Authorization Act of 2012, passing the Equal Rights Amendment, reversing the Citizens United ruling and closing all U.S. military bases. Other policies included granting "undocumented immigrants ... a legal status which includes the chance to become U.S. citizens" while halting their deportations, and ending the war on drugs by putting a bigger emphasis on treatment instead of incarceration.

=== Polling ===
In September Jill Stein began appearing on nationwide election polls. A CNN poll taken from September 7–9 reported that 2% of registered voters responded that they were voting for Stein and 1% of likely voters would vote for Stein. A poll by JZ Analytics taken from September 11–12 reported that 1.9% of registered voters were voting for Stein and 0.9% of likely voters would vote for Stein. Gallup Tracking found from a poll taken from September 6–9 that 1% of registered voters and 1% of likely voters were planning on voting for Stein. A JZ Analytics poll taken from September 21–22 reported that 1.6% of those questioned were voting for Stein.

On October 1, CNN released a poll with 3% of registered voters and 3% of likely voters responding that they were planning on voting for Stein. A CNN poll take in Ohio from October 5–8 reported that 1% of voters in the state were planning on voting for Stein.

=== Results ===
On Election Day, Stein received 469,501 votes (0.36% of the popular vote). Stein received nearly triple the number of votes Cynthia McKinney received in 2008 (161,797 votes or 0.12%) and nearly four times the number of votes David Cobb received in 2004 (119,859 votes; 0.10%). Stein received over 1% of the popular vote in three states: 1.3% in Maine, 1.1% in Oregon, and 1.0% in Alaska.

== Ballot status ==
The following is a table comparison of ballot status for the Green Party presidential nominee in 2012 to 2008 and 2004. After the 2010 census the Electoral College changed.

	Electoral Votes	2012	2008	2004
States	51	37 (44)	32 (48)	25 (43)
Electoral Votes	538	439 (489)	368 (528)	267 (479)
Percent of EVs	100%	81.6% (90.9%)	71.0% (96.2%)	49.6% (89.0%)
Alabama	9	On ballot	(write-in)	(write-in)
Alaska	3	On ballot	(write-in)	On ballot
Arizona	11	On ballot	On ballot	(write-in)
Arkansas	6	On ballot	On ballot	On ballot
California	55	On ballot	On ballot	On ballot
Colorado	9	On ballot	On ballot	On ballot
Connecticut	7	(write-in)	(write-in)	On ballot
Delaware	3	On ballot	On ballot	On ballot
Florida	29	On ballot	On ballot	On ballot
Georgia	16	(write-in)	(write-in)	(write-in)
Hawaii	4	On ballot	On ballot	On ballot
Idaho	4	On ballot	(write-in)	(write-in)
Illinois	20	On ballot	On ballot	(write-in)
Indiana	11	(write-in)	(write-in)	(write-in)
Iowa	6	On ballot	On ballot	On ballot
Kansas	6	(write-in)	(write-in)	(write-in)
Kentucky	8	On ballot	(write-in)	
Louisiana	8	On ballot	On ballot	On ballot
Maine	4	On ballot	On ballot	On ballot
Maryland	10	On ballot	On ballot	On ballot
Massachusetts	11	On ballot	On ballot	
Michigan	16	On ballot	On ballot	On ballot
Minnesota	10	On ballot	On ballot	On ballot
Mississippi	6	On ballot	On ballot	On ballot
Missouri	10		(write-in)	
Montana	3		(write-in)	On ballot
Nebraska	5		On ballot	On ballot
Nevada	6		On ballot	On ballot
New Hampshire	4	(write-in)	(write-in)	(write-in)
New Jersey	14	On ballot	On ballot	On ballot
New Mexico	5	On ballot	On ballot	On ballot
New York	29	On ballot	On ballot	(write-in)
North Carolina	15		(write-in)	(write-in)
North Dakota	3	On ballot	(write-in)	
Ohio	18	On ballot	On ballot	(write-in)
Oklahoma	7			
Oregon	7	On ballot	On ballot	On ballot
Pennsylvania	20	On ballot	(write-in)	On ballot
Rhode Island	4	On ballot	On ballot	On ballot
South Carolina	9	On ballot	On ballot	On ballot
South Dakota	3			
Tennessee	11	On ballot	On ballot	(write-in)
Texas	38	On ballot	(write-in)	(write-in)
Utah	6	On ballot	On ballot	(write-in)
Vermont	3	(write-in)	(write-in)	(write-in)
Virginia	13	On ballot	On ballot	(write-in)
Washington	12	On ballot	On ballot	On ballot
West Virginia	5	On ballot	On ballot	(write-in)
Wisconsin	10	On ballot	On ballot	On ballot
Wyoming	3	(write-in)	(write-in)	(write-in)
District of Columbia	3	On ballot	On ballot	(write-in)

== Endorsements ==
List of Jill Stein endorsements

People

- Noam Chomsky, author and activist.
- Richard Stallman, computer programmer and software freedom activist.
- David Swanson, author and activist.
- Medea Benjamin, co-founder of Code Pink and Global Exchange.
- Ana Kasparian, co-host of the internet news show, The Young Turks.
- Chris Hedges, Pulitzer Prize-winning journalist and war correspondent.
- Kevin Zeese, activist and attorney.
- Camille Paglia, author, teacher, and social critic.
- Matt Gonzalez, politician, lawyer, activist and 2008 independent Vice-Presidential candidate.
- Jello Biafra, musician and 2000 election Green Party candidate.
- Julia Butterfly Hill, author, environmentalist, and activist.
- Colin Beavan, writer, politician, and star of No Impact Man.
- Howie Hawkins, politician, activist, and co-founder of Clamshell Alliance.
- Richard Wolff, economist and professor emeritus at University of Massachusetts Amherst.
- David Cobb, 2004 Green Party presidential candidate and member of POCLAD (Program on Corporations Law & Democracy).
- Albert Bates, lawyer, author, director of Ecovillage Training Center, and director of Institute for Appropriate Technology.
- Rosa Clemente, Hip Hop activist and 2008 Green Party vice-presidential candidate.
- Shamako Noble, Hip Hop artist and Hip-Hop activist.
- Kshama Sawant, professor at Seattle University and Seattle Central Community College, Socialist Alternative candidate for Position 1 in the 43rd District of the Washington House of Representatives.
- Alex Winter, actor, screenwriter, and director.
- Dorli Rainey, Occupy Seattle activist and former candidate for Mayor of Seattle.
- Dave Marsh, music critic, author, and radio host.
- John Eskow, screenwriter.
- Mike Malinin, musician (Goo Goo Dolls).
- Bhaskar Sunkara, political writer; founding editor and publisher of Jacobin
- Leah Bolger, president of Veterans for Peace.
- Bruce Gagnon, coordinator of Global Network against Weapons and Nuclear Power in Space.
- George Martin, national co-chair of United for Peace and Justice and program director of Peace Action Wisconsin.
- Sean Sweeney, co-author of United Nations Environmental Programme report on Global Green Jobs.
- Steve Breyman, Assoc. Prof. of Science and Technology Studies at Rensselaer Polytechnic Institute.
- David Schwartzman, Prof. Emeritus of Biology at Howard University.
- Charles Komanoff, energy-policy analyst and director of the Carbon Tax Center.
- Mark Dunlea, author, activist, and president of the Green Education and Legal Fund.
- Nathanael Fortune, professor of physics at Smith College.
- Masada Disenhouse, member of SanDiego350 and Secretary of the Green Party of San Diego County.
- Ted Glick, author.
- Linda Piera-Avila, Vice Chair of Santa Monica Urban Forest Task Force.
- Mimi Newton, environmental attorney.
- Katey Culver, owner of Song to Gaia Gardens, co-founder of Green Party of Tennessee, and partner of Ecoville ArchiTechs.
- Aaron Pacitti, assistant professor of economics at Siena College.
- Howard Switzer, architect and partner of Ecoville ArchiTechs.
- Dr. Andy Coates, president-elect of Physicians for a National Health Program, assistant professor at Albany Medical College, and member of Public Employees Federation.
- Dr. Margaret Flowers, co-chair of the Maryland chapter and national board advisor for Physicians for a National Health Program, board member of Healthcare-NOW!, and member of the steering committee of the Leadership Conference for Guaranteed Health Care.
- Katie Robbins, member of the Board of Directors of Healthcare-NOW!.
- Gloria Mattera, Executive Board member of Physicians for a National Health Program, member of the steering committee of Develop Don't Destroy Brooklyn, and Program Director of Bellevue Hospital Center.
- Glen Ford, editor of Black Agenda Report.
- Jared Ball, Associate Communications Professor at Morgan State University, Radio producer and host for WPFW.
- Kahlil Jacobs Fantauzzi, Green Party candidate for Mayor of Berkeley, California.
- DLabrie, Hip Hop artist, President of RonDavoux Records and community organizer.
- Ashley Proctor, activist and member of the Women's Economic Agenda Project.
- Kimberly King, Assistant Psychology Professor at California State University Los Angeles and producer for The Beautiful Struggle on KPFK.
- Cheri Pace, adviser to Georgia Council on Developmental Disabilities, guest lecturer at Dalton State College, and former Undergraduate Student Representative on the Board of the National Association of Social Workers, Georgia Chapter.
- Malcolm Hoover, activist, editor of 4080 Magazine, and program analyst for the City of Oakland, California.
- Khalilah Collins, former Executive Director of W.I.T. (Women In Transition).
- Krista Keating, writer, feminist, and member of Hip Hop Congress.
- Ron Gubitz, educator and co-founder of Hip Hop Congress.
- Sandy Perry, Outreach Minister for Christian Homeless Alliance Ministries.
- Janice Carolina, housing activist and Senior Fair Housing Paralegal for Legal Aid Society in Santa Clara County.
- Manny Phesto, Hip Hop artist and community organizer.
- Rahman Jamaal, Hip Hop artist, educator, and star of The Beat.
- Dione Johnson, founder of The Multi-Media Center.
- Head-Roc, Hip Hop artist, activist, and contributor to The Huffington Post.
- Hugh Giordano, organizer for United Food and Commercial Workers and former Pennsylvania State Representative candidate.
- Sunyata Altenor, organizing coordinator for Illinois Caucus for Adolescent Health, program director for Latin American and Caribbean Community Center, and member of Committee of Interns and Residents.
- Charles Post, professor of sociology at Borough of Manhattan Community College and Professional Staff Congress Vice Chair for Borough of Manhattan Community College.
- Warren Davis, former executive vice president of American Federation of Government Employees Local 2006, board member of Philadelphia Jobs with Justice, and volunteer consultant on labor relations at Philadelphia Security Officers Union.
- Karen Young, officer of The Newspaper Guild.
- Barry Eidlin, American Sociological Association-National Science Foundation Postdoctoral Fellow at University of Wisconsin–Madison, former Development Director for Teamsters for a Democratic Union, and member of United Faculty and Academic Staff.
- Marie Stolzenberg, Teaching Assistants Association, former organizer for U.S. PIRG, and former organizer for Opportunity Maine.
- Nick Limbeck, member of Chicago Teachers Union, activist with Occupy Chicago, and member of Student Labor Action Coalition.
- Mike McCallister, writer, member of the National Writers Union, and former chair of the South Central Wisconsin Labor Party.
- Jim Moran, former director of Philadelphia Area Project on Occupational Safety and Health.
- Justin Harrison, 13000 Unit 1 president of Communications Workers of America.
- Allan Herman, Local 927 executive board member of International Alliance of Theatrical Stage Employees.
- Steve Edwards, former president of Local 2858 American Federation of State, County and Municipal Employees.
- Tom Crean, chapter leader of United Federation of Teachers.
- Marty Harrison, executive board member of Temple University Hospital Nurses Association and Pennsylvania Association of Staff Nurses and Allied Professionals.
- David Myron, member of the Michigan Education Association and former Local President of the Perry Education Association.
- Francesca Gomes, delegate in the United Federation of Teachers.
- Ashok Kumar, activist and former member of the Dane County Board.
- Brad Hall, chairman of the Florida Pirate Party.
- Tom Thirion, founder and president of Green Peace Corp.
- Mort Malkin, writer.
- Lawrence A. Winans, editor of Dissenting Democrat, former executive director of Minnesota Fair Housing Center, co-founder/former president of Minnesota Coalition for the Homeless, and former executive director of Partners for Affordable Housing.
- Lynda Deschambault, former mayor of Moraga, California.
- Joanne Landy, co-founder and co-director of Campaign for Peace and Democracy.
- Robert I. Bloom, scientist and Smithsonian Award recipient.
- Marian Kramer, founder and president of the National Welfare Rights Union and co-founder of Highland Park Human Rights Coalition.
- Maureen Taylor, chair of the Michigan Welfare Rights Organization and Treasurer of the National Welfare Rights Union.
- Reverend Edward and Dorothy Pinkney, founders of Black Autonomy Network Community Organization.
- Lynette Malles, Occupy Homes Minnesota and Minnesota Poor People's Economic Human Rights Campaign.
- Mary Bricker-Jenkins, USA-Canada Alliance of Inhabitants & former co-chair of the Assembly to End Poverty.
- Monica Beemer, executive director of Sisters of the Road.
- Rick Tingling-Clemmons, former United States House of Representatives candidate, former consultant for Metropolitan District of Columbia Health Consortium, and former member of Washington DC Advisory Neighborhood Commission.
- Eric Sheptock, Chair of Shelter Housing and Respectful Change.
- Lee Ballinger, West Coast Editor of Rock & Rap Confidential.
- Jennifer Jewell, Director of Women in Transition.
- Sister Margaret McKenna, Director of New Jerusalem Laura.
- Galen Tyler, Director of Kensington Welfare Rights Union.
- Tara Colon, Poor People's Economic Human Rights Campaign.
- George Friday, executive committee member of Move to Amend.
- Dorothy (Dottie) Stevens, Massachusetts Welfare Rights Union.
- Bob Flanagan, organizer for Worcester Homeless Action Committee.
- Reverend Bruce Wright, Refuge Ministries.
- Rev. Dennis Segall, Coalition for the Reform of Youth Services.
- Jeremy Alderson, Founder of the Homeless Marathon.
- Paul Boden, Organizing Director of Western Regional Advocacy Project.
- Gloria M. Sandoval, President of California Central Valley Journey for Justice.

Organizations

- Socialist Alternative
- Canvass for a Cause\
- Green Party of England and Wales
