= Cooperative =

Autonomous association of persons or organizations

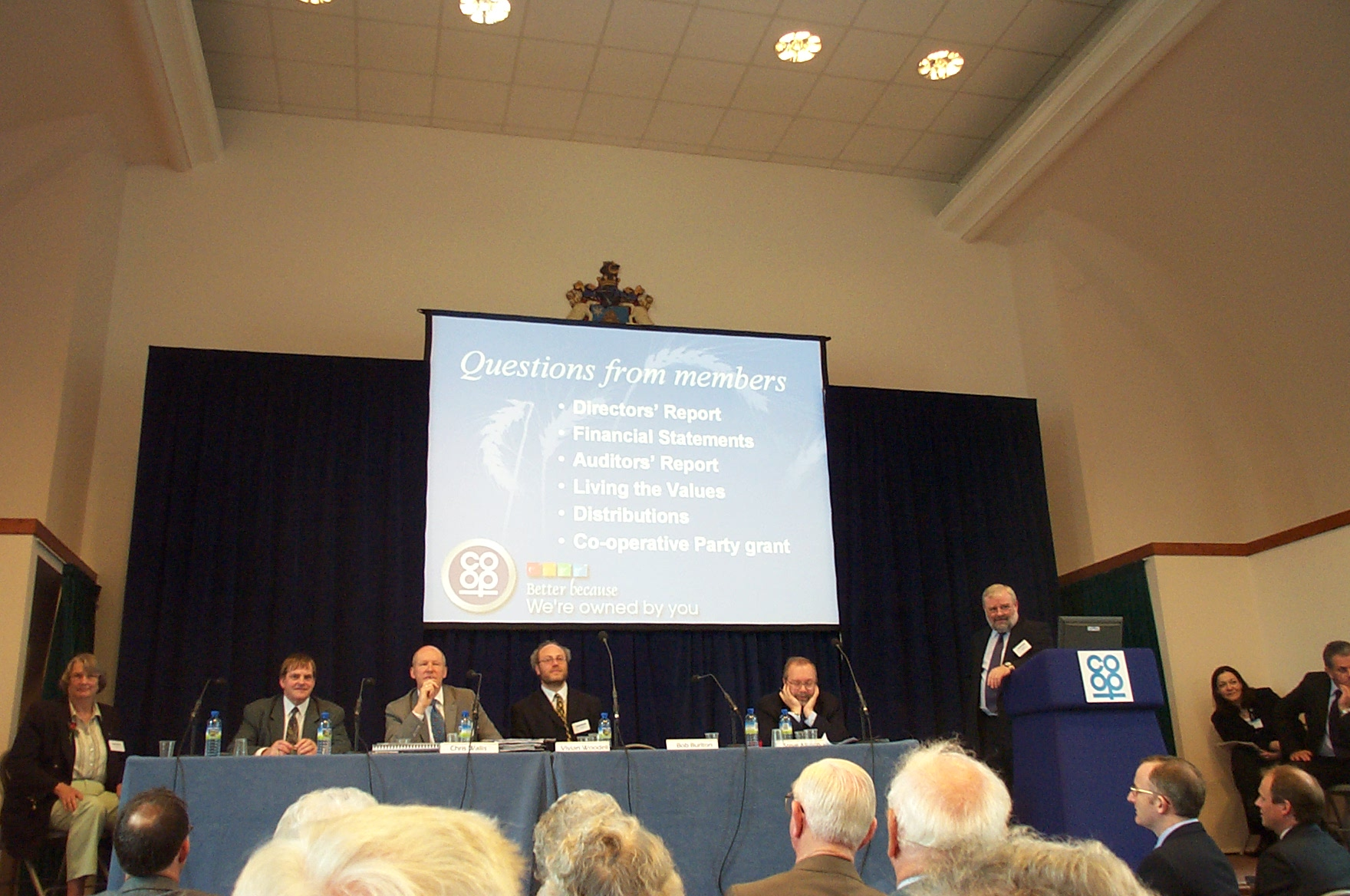
The volunteer board of a retail consumer cooperative, such as the former Oxford, Swindon & Gloucester Co-op, is held to account at an annual general meeting of members.

A cooperative (also known as co-operative, coöperative, co-op, or coop) is "an autonomous association of persons united voluntarily to meet their common economic, social and cultural needs and aspirations through a jointly owned and democratically-controlled enterprise". Cooperatives are democratically controlled by their members, with each member having one vote in electing the board of directors. They differ from collectives in that they are generally built from the bottom-up, rather than the top-down. Types of cooperative include worker cooperatives, consumer cooperatives, and producer cooperatives.

Research published by the Worldwatch Institute found that in 2012 approximately one billion people in 96 countries had become members of at least one cooperative. The turnover of the largest three hundred cooperatives in the world reached $2.2 trillion.

Worker cooperatives are typically more productive and economically resilient than many other forms of enterprise, with twice the number of co-operatives (80%) surviving their first five years compared with other business ownership models (44%) according to data from United Kingdom. The largest worker owned cooperative in the world, the Mondragon Corporation (founded by Catholic priest José María Arizmendiarrieta), has been in continuous operation since 1956.

Cooperatives frequently have social goals, which they aim to accomplish by investing a proportion of trading profits back into their communities. As an example of this, in 2013, retail co-operatives in the UK invested 6.9% of their pre-tax profits in the communities in which they trade, compared to 2.4% for rival supermarkets.

Since 2002, cooperatives have been distinguishable on the Internet through the use of a .coop domain. In 2014, the International Cooperative Alliance (ICA) introduced the Cooperative Marque, meaning ICA cooperatives and WOCCU credit unions can also be identified through a coop ethical consumerism label.

== Origins and history ==
Cooperation dates back as far as human beings have been organizing for mutual benefits. Tribes were organized as cooperative structures, allocating jobs and resources among each other, only trading with the external communities. In alpine environments, trade could only be maintained in organized cooperatives to achieve a useful condition of artificial roads such as Viamala in 1472. Pre-industrial Europe is home to the first cooperatives from an industrial context. The roots of the cooperative movement can be traced to multiple influences and extend worldwide. In the English-speaking world, post-feudal forms of cooperation between workers and owners that are expressed today as "profit sharing" and "surplus sharing" arrangements existed as far back as 1795. The key ideological influence on the Anglosphere branch of the cooperative movement, however, was a rejection of the charity principles that underpinned welfare reforms when the British government radically revised its Poor Laws in 1834. As both state and church institutions began to routinely distinguish between the 'deserving' and 'undeserving' poor, a movement of friendly societies grew throughout the British Empire based on the principle of mutuality, committed to self-help in the welfare of working people.

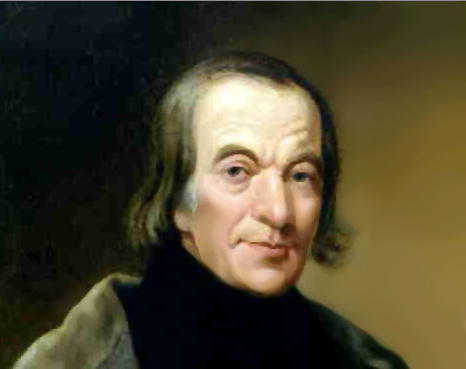
Robert Owen (1771–1858) was a social reformer and a pioneer of the cooperative movement.

In 1761, the Fenwick Weavers' Society was formed in Fenwick, East Ayrshire, Scotland to sell discounted oatmeal to local workers. Its services expanded to include assistance with savings and loans, emigration and education. In 1810, Welsh social reformer Robert Owen, from Newtown in mid-Wales, and his partners purchased the New Lanark mill from Owen's father-in-law, David Dale, and proceeded to introduce better labour standards, including discounted retail shops where profits were passed on to his employees. Owen left New Lanark to pursue other forms of cooperative organization and develop coop ideas through writing and lecture. Cooperative communities were set up in Glasgow, Indiana; and Hampshire, although ultimately unsuccessful. In 1828, William King set up a newspaper, The Cooperator, to promote Owen's thinking, having already set up a cooperative store in Brighton.

Also in 1810, Rev. Henry Duncan of the Ruthwell Presbyterian Church in Dumfriesshire, Scotland founded a friendly society to create a cooperative depository institution at which his poorest parishioners could hold savings accounts accruing interest for sickness and old-age, which was the first established savings bank that would be merged into the Trustee Savings Bank between 1970 and 1985. The Rochdale Society of Equitable Pioneers, founded in 1844, is usually considered the first successful cooperative enterprise, used as a model for modern coops, following the 'Rochdale Principles'. A group of 28 weavers and other artisans in Rochdale, England set up the society to open their own store selling food items they could not otherwise afford. Within ten years there were over a thousand cooperative societies in the United Kingdom.

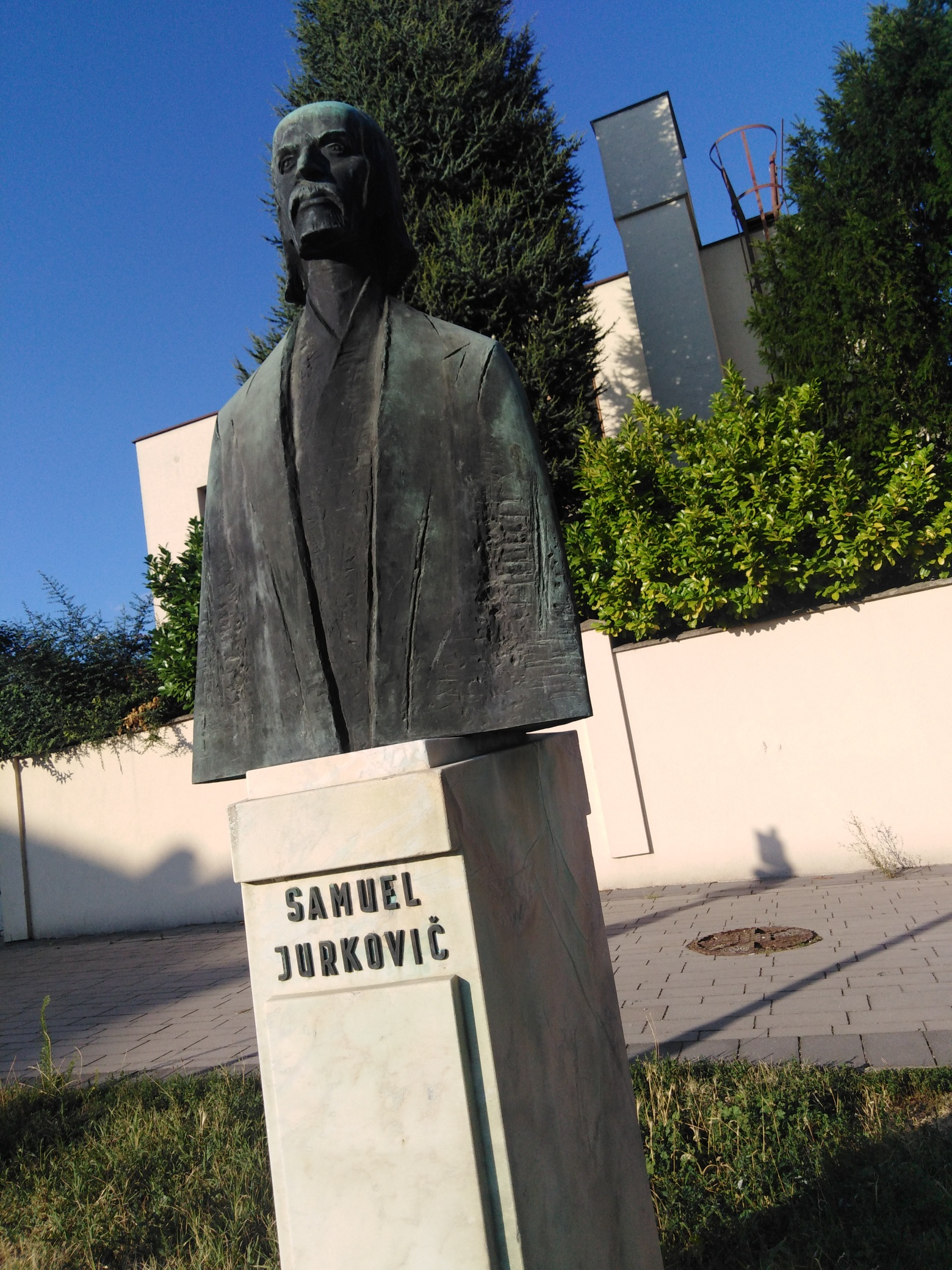
The statue of Samuel Jurkovič, national awakener and founder of first cooperative in Central Europe (Spolok Gazdovský) in Rača, Bratislava

Spolok Gazdovský [The Association of Administrators, or The Association of Farmers] founded in 1845 by Samuel Jurkovič, was the first cooperative in Europe (credit union). The cooperative provided a cheap loan from funds generated by regular savings for members of the cooperative. Members of cooperative had to commit to a moral life and had to plant two trees in a public place every year. Despite the short duration of its existence, until 1851, it thus formed the basis of the cooperative movement in Slovakia. Slovak national thinker Ľudovít Štúr said about the association: "We would very much like such excellent constitutions to be established throughout our region. They would help to rescue people from evil and misery. A beautiful, great idea, a beautiful excellent constitution!"

Other events such as the founding of a friendly society by the Tolpuddle Martyrs in 1832 were key occasions in the creation of organized labor and consumer movements.

Friendly Societies established forums through which one member, one vote was practiced in organisation decision-making. The principles challenged the idea that a person should be an owner of property before being granted a political voice. Throughout the second half of the nineteenth century (and then repeatedly every twenty years or so) there was a surge in the number of cooperative organisations, both in commercial practice and civil society, operating to advance democracy and universal suffrage as a political principle. Friendly Societies and consumer cooperatives became the dominant form of organization among working people in Anglosphere industrial societies prior to the rise of trade unions and industrial factories. Weinbren reports that by the end of the 19th century, over 80% of British working age men and 90% of Australian working age men were members of one or more Friendly Society.

From the mid-nineteenth century, mutual organisations embraced these ideas in economic enterprises, firstly among tradespeople, and later in cooperative stores, educational institutes, financial institutions and industrial enterprises. The common thread (enacted in different ways, and subject to the constraints of various systems of national law) is the principle that an enterprise or association should be owned and controlled by the people it serves, and share any surpluses on the basis of each member's cooperative contribution (as a producer, labourer or consumer) rather than their capacity to invest financial capital.

The International Cooperative Alliance was the first international association formed (1895) by the cooperative movement. It includes the World Council of Credit Unions. The International Cooperative Alliance was founded in London on 19 August 1895 during the 1st Cooperative Congress. In attendance were delegates from cooperatives from Argentina, Australia, Belgium, England, Denmark, France, Germany, Holland, India, Italy, Switzerland, Serbia, and the US. A second organization formed later in Germany: the International Raiffeisen Union. In the United States, the National Cooperative Business Association (NCBA CLUSA; the abbreviation of the organization retains the initials of its former name, Cooperative League of the USA) serves as the sector's oldest national membership association. It is dedicated to ensuring that cooperative businesses have the same opportunities as other businesses operating in the country and that consumers have access to cooperatives in the marketplace.

In 1945 Artturi Ilmari Virtanen received the Nobel Prize in Chemistry for his invention of the AIV silage. This invention improved milk production and created a method of preserving butter, the AIV salt, which led to increased Finnish butter exports. He had started his career in chemistry in Valio, a cooperative of dairy farmers in which he headed the research department for 50 years and where all his major inventions were first put to practice.

Cooperative banks were first to adopt online banking. Stanford Federal Credit Union was the first financial institution to offer online internet banking services to all of its members in October 1994. In 1996 OP Financial Group, also a cooperative bank, became the second online bank in the world and the first in Europe.

By 2004 a new association focused on worker co-ops was founded, the United States Federation of Worker Cooperatives. The cooperative movement has been fueled globally by ideas of economic democracy. In an economic democracy, decision-making power is expanded from a small minority of corporate shareholders to a large majority of public stakeholders. An early vision of an economic democracy was the co-operative commonwealth, publicized by Laurence Gronlund in the late 1800s.

Reformers ascribe to different approaches to thinking about and building an economic democracy. Anarchists are committed to libertarian socialism and have focused on local organization, including locally managed cooperatives, linked through confederations of unions, cooperatives and communities. Marxists, who as socialists have likewise held and worked for the goal of democratizing productive and reproductive relationships, often emphasized reforming the larger scales of human organization. They viewed the capitalist class to be politically, militarily and culturally mobilized for the purpose of maintaining power over an exploitable working class, so they fought in the early 20th century to appropriate from the capitalist class the society's collective political capacity in the form of the state. Though they regard the state as an unnecessarily oppressive institution, Marxists considered the appropriation of national and international-scale capitalist institutions, resources and the state itself to be an important first step in creating conditions favorable to solidaristic economies. With the declining influence of the USSR after the 1960s, a variety of socialist strategies emerged. So far, economic democratizers have not fundamentally challenged the hegemony of global neoliberal capitalism.

== Meaning ==
=== Identity ===
==== Coop principles and values ====
Many cooperatives follow the seven Rochdale Principles:

1. Voluntary and open membership
2. Democratic member control, with each member having one vote.
3. Economic participation by members
4. Autonomy and independence
5. Education, training and information
6. Cooperation among cooperatives
7. Concern for community

==== Coop Marque and domain ====
The Co-op Marque, a symbol used by co-operatives internationally

Since 2002, ICA cooperatives and WOCCU credit unions could be distinguished by use of a .coop domain. In 2014, ICA introduced the Global Cooperative Marque for use by ICAs Cooperative members and by WOCCU's Credit Union members so they can be further identified by their coop ethical consumerism label. The marque is used today by thousands of cooperatives in more than a hundred countries.

The .coop domain and Co-operative Marque were designed as a new symbol of the global cooperative movement and its collective identity in the digital age. The Co-operative Marque and domain is reserved just for co-operatives, credit unions and organisations that support co-operatives; is distinguished by its ethical badge that subscribes to the seven ICA Cooperative Principles and Co-op Values. Co-ops can be identified on the Internet through the use of the .coop suffix of internet addresses. Organizations using .coop domain names must adhere to the basic co-op values.

=== Cooperatives as legal entities ===
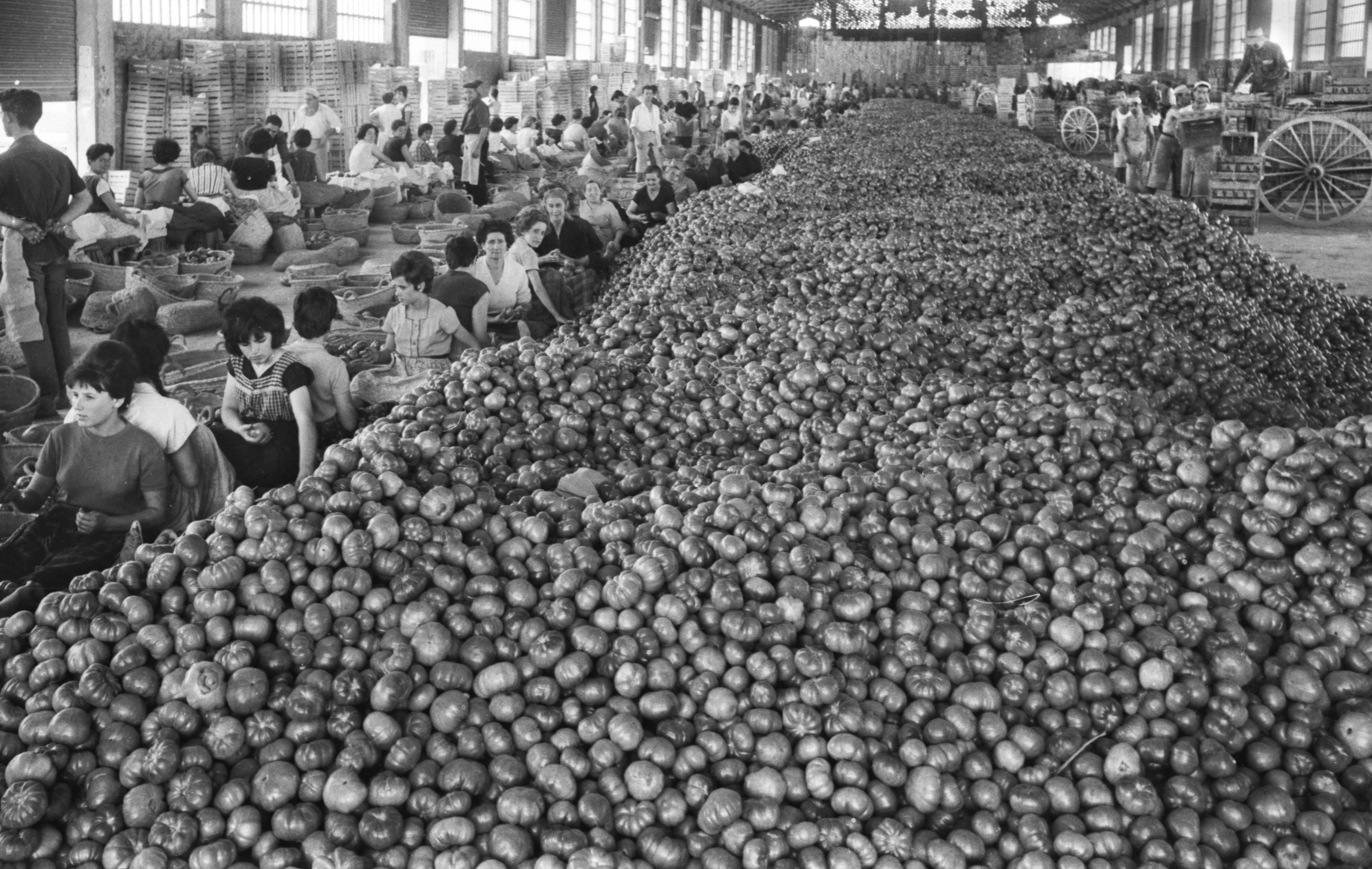
Cooperative of agricultural products of Alginet, 1963

A cooperative is a legal entity owned and democratically controlled by its members. Members often have a close association with the enterprise as producers or consumers of its products or services, or as its employees. The legal entities have a range of social characteristics. Membership is open, meaning that anyone who satisfies certain non-discriminatory conditions may join. Economic benefits are distributed proportionally to each member's level of participation in the cooperative, for instance, by a dividend on sales or purchases, rather than according to capital invested. Cooperatives may be classified as either worker, consumer, producer, purchasing or housing cooperatives. They are distinguished from other forms of incorporation in that profit-making or economic stability are balanced by the interests of the community.

There are specific forms of incorporation for cooperatives in some countries, for example Finland and Australia. Cooperatives may take the form of companies limited by shares or by guarantee, partnerships or unincorporated associations. In the UK they may also use the industrial and provident society structure. In the US, cooperatives are often organized as non-capital stock corporations under state-specific cooperative laws. Cooperatives often share their earnings with the membership as dividends, which are divided among the members according to their participation in the enterprise, such as patronage, instead of according to the value of their capital shareholdings (as is done by a joint stock company).

=== Cooperative share capital ===
The cooperative share capital or co-operative share capital (in short cooperative capital or co-operative capital) is the form of capital that the cooperative accumulates from the paid participation shares of its members. The total amount of participation shares the paid to the cooperative constitutes the cooperative capital. The co-operative share capital is usually non-withdrawable and indivisible to the cooperative members.

== Types of cooperatives ==
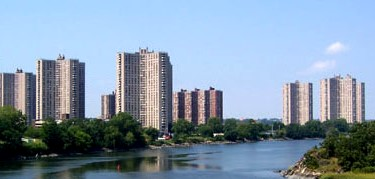
Co-op City in The Bronx, New York City, is the largest cooperative housing development in the world, with 55,000 people.

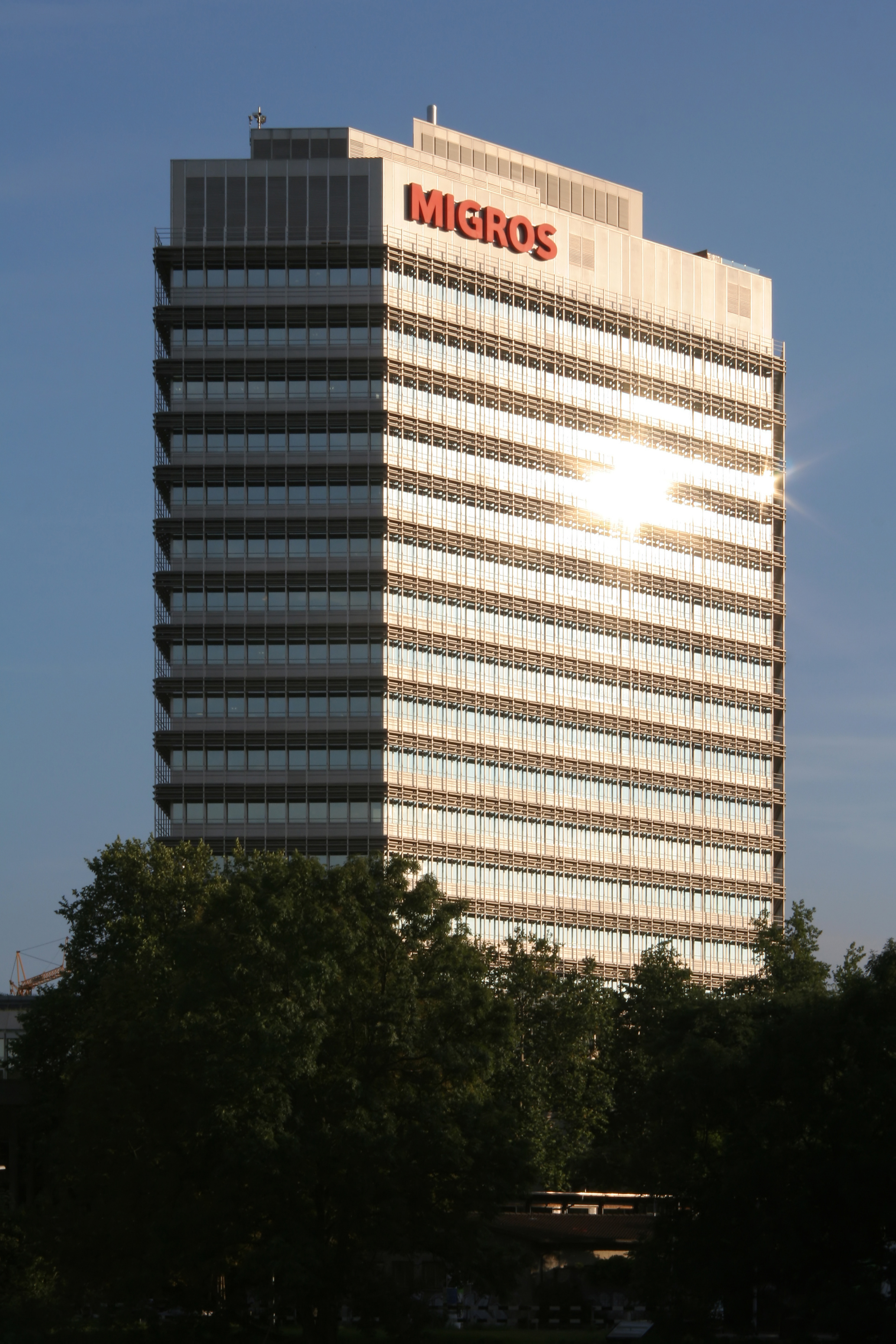
The two largest supermarkets chains in Switzerland, Migros and Coop, are cooperatives. The third largest bank, Raiffeisen, is a cooperative as well.

The top 300 largest cooperatives were listed in 2007 by the International Cooperative Alliance. 80% were involved in either agriculture, finance, or retail and more than half were in the United States, Italy, or France.

=== Consumer cooperative ===
A consumer cooperative is a business owned by its customers. Members vote on major decisions and elect the board of directors from among their own number. The first of these was set up in 1844 in the North-West of England by 28 weavers who wanted to sell food at a lower price than the local shops.

==== Retail cooperative ====
Retail cooperatives are retailers, such as grocery stores, owned by their customers. They should not be confused with retailers' cooperatives, whose members are retailers rather than consumers. In Singapore, Italy, and Finland, the company with the largest market share in the grocery store sector is a consumer owned cooperative. In Switzerland, both the largest and the second largest retailer are consumer owned cooperatives.

==== Housing cooperative ====
A housing cooperative is a legal mechanism for ownership of housing where residents either own shares (share capital co-op) reflecting their equity in the cooperative's real estate or have membership and occupancy rights in a not-for-profit cooperative (non-share capital co-op), and they underwrite their housing through paying subscriptions or rent.

Housing cooperatives come in three basic equity structures

- In market-rate housing cooperatives, members may sell their shares in the cooperative whenever they like for whatever price the market will bear, much like any other residential property. Market-rate co-ops are very common in New York City.
- Limited equity housing cooperatives, which are often used by affordable housing developers, allow members to own some equity in their home, but limit the sale price of their membership share to that which they paid.
- Group equity or zero-equity housing cooperatives do not allow members to own equity in their residences and often have rental agreements well below market rates.

Members of a building cooperative (in Britain known as a self-build housing cooperative) pool resources to build housing, normally using a high proportion of their own labor. When the building is finished, each member is the sole owner of a homestead, and the cooperative may be dissolved.

This collective effort was at the origin of many of Britain's building societies, which however, developed into "permanent" mutual savings and loan organisations, a term which persisted in some of their names (such as the former Leeds Permanent). Nowadays such self-building may be financed using a step-by-step mortgage which is released in stages as the building is completed. The term may also refer to worker cooperatives in the building trade.

==== Utility cooperative ====
A utility cooperative is a type of consumer cooperative that is tasked with the delivery of a public utility such as electricity, water or telecommunications services to its members. Profits are either reinvested into infrastructure or distributed to members in the form of "patronage" or "capital credits", which are essentially dividends paid on a member's investment into the cooperative. In the United States, many cooperatives were formed to provide rural electrical and telephone service as part of the New Deal. See Rural Utilities Service.

In the case of electricity, cooperatives are generally either generation and transmission (G&T) co-ops that create and send power via the transmission grid or local distribution co-ops that gather electricity from a variety of sources and send it along to homes and businesses.

In Tanzania, it has been proven that the cooperative method is helpful in water distribution. When the people are involved with their own water, they care more because the quality of their work has a direct effect on the quality of their water.

==== Credit unions, cooperative banking and cooperative insurance ====
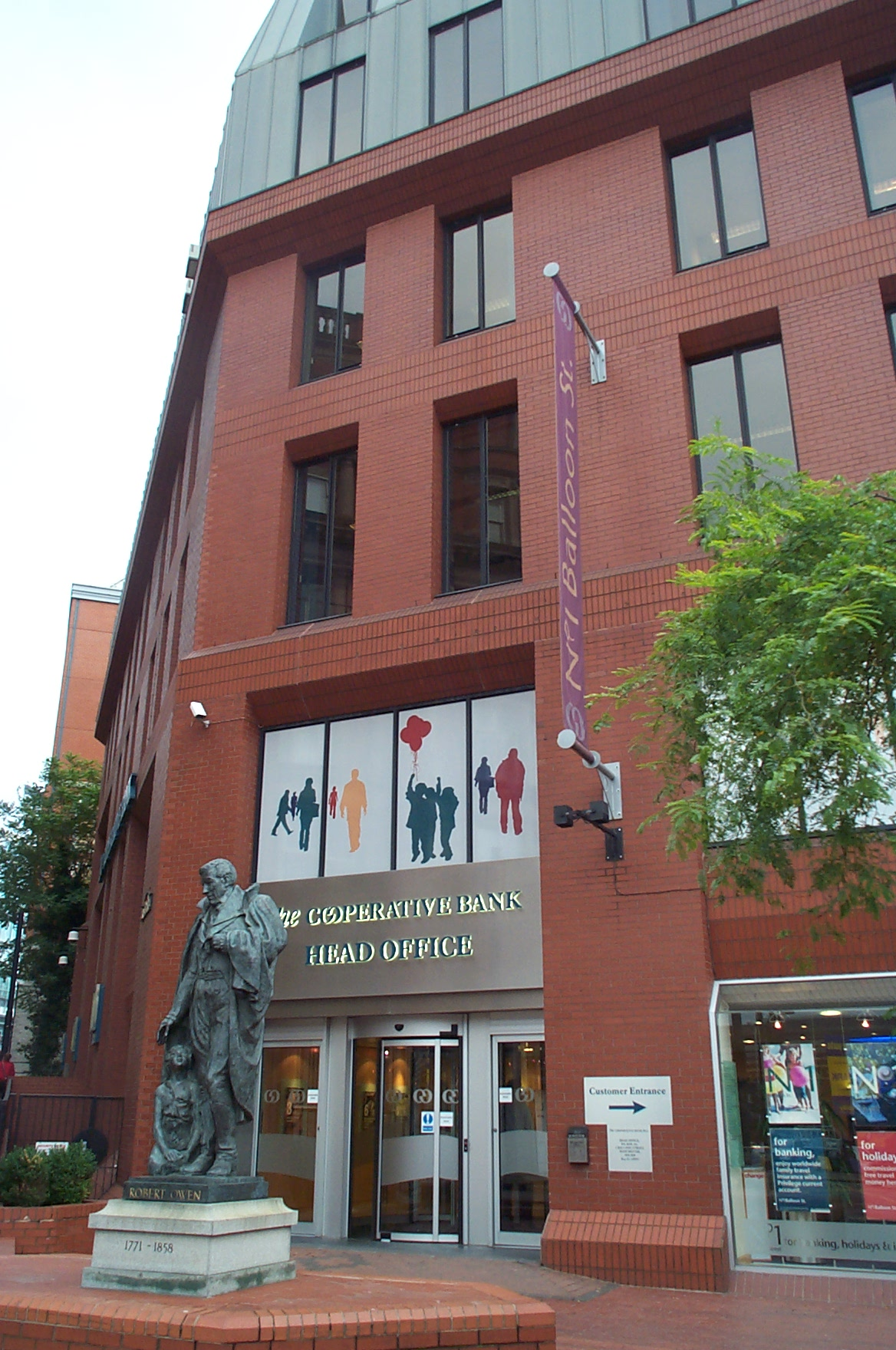
The Co-operative Bank's head office in Manchester. The statue in front is of Robert Owen, a pioneer in the cooperative movement.

Credit unions are cooperative financial institutions owned and controlled by their members. Credit unions provide to its members the same services as banks but are considered not-for-profit organizations and adhere to cooperative principles.

Credit unions originated in mid-19th-century Germany through the efforts of pioneers Franz Herman Schulze'Delitzsch and Friedrich Wilhelm Raiffeisen. The concept of financial cooperatives crossed the Atlantic at the turn of the 20th century, when the caisse populaire movement was started by Alphonse Desjardins in Quebec, Canada. In 1900, from his home in Lévis, he opened North America's first credit union, marking the beginning of the Mouvement Desjardins. Eight years later, Desjardins provided guidance for the first credit union in the US, where there are about 7,950 active status federally insured credit unions, with almost 90 million members and more than $679 billion on deposit.

Financial cooperatives hold a significant market share in Europe and Latin America, as well as a few countries in Sub-Saharan Africa. They also have a strong presence in Asia, Australia, and the United States. According to the World Council of Credit Unions (WOCCU), there were 68,882 financial cooperatives in 109 countries in 2016, serving more than 235 million members, with total assets exceeding 1.7 trillion dollars. The WOCCU's data do not include some major financial cooperative networks in Europe, such as Germany, Finland, France, Denmark, and Italy. In many high-income economies, financial cooperatives hold significant market shares of the banking sector.

According to the European Association of Cooperative Banks, the market share of cooperative banks in the Small and Medium Enterprises (SMEs) credit market by the end of 2016 was 37% in Finland, 45% in France, 33% in Germany, 43% in the Netherlands, and 22% in Canada. In Germany, Volksbanken-Raiffeisen banks have a market share of approximately 21% of domestic credit and domestic deposits. In the Netherlands, Rabobank holds 34% of deposits, and in France cooperative banks (Crédit Agricole, Crédit Mutuel and BPCE Group) possess more than 59% of domestic credit and 61% of domestic deposits. In Finland, OP financial group holds 35% and 38% of domestic credit and deposits, respectively, and in Canada, Desjardins holds around 42% of domestic deposits and 22% of domestic credit.

There are many types of cooperative financial institutions with different names across the world, including financial cooperatives ('cooperativa financiera' is the Spanish term used in Latin America), cooperative banks, credit unions, and savings and credit cooperatives ('cooperativa de ahorro y crédito' in Spanish or 'coopérative d'épargne et de credit' in French-speaking countries).

Cooperative banking networks, which were nationalized in Eastern Europe, continued as cooperative institutions. In Poland, the SKOK (Spółdzielcze Kasy Oszczędnościowo-Kredytowe) network grew to serve over 1 million members via 13,000 branches, and was larger than the country's largest conventional bank.

In the Scandinavia, there is a clear distinction between mutual savings banks (Sparbank) and true credit unions (Andelsbank).

The oldest cooperative banks in Europe, based on the ideas of Friedrich Raiffeisen, are joined in the 'Urgenossen'.

==== Community co-operative ====
A community cooperative is owned and governed by members of a local geographical community. It is established to meet the community's needs by providing goods or services that are not available or affordable through traditional market channels. This is distinct from meeting individuals' needs as individuals.

The aim of a community cooperative is often to create a more equitable and sustainable economy that serves the needs of local residents, rather than generating profits for external shareholders. By working together and pooling resources, members can often achieve economies of scale, negotiate better prices, and develop services that better meet the needs of their community. Community cooperatives can also help to build social capital and foster a sense of community ownership and pride. They have been successful vehicles for rural development in the Gaeltacht in Ireland and the Highlands and Islands of Scotland.

=== Worker cooperative ===
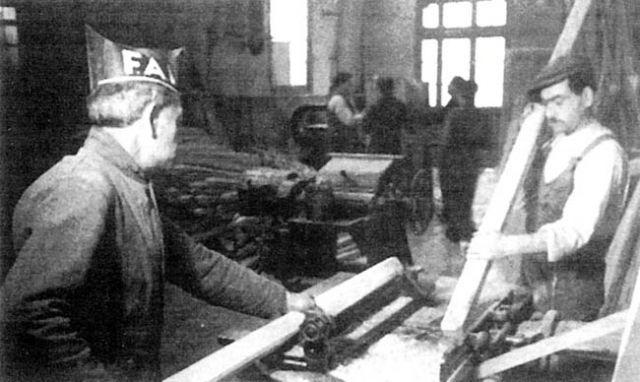
CNT-FAI worker cooperative in Barcelona producing wood and steel products

A worker cooperative or producer cooperative is a cooperative owned and democratically controlled by its "worker-owners". In a pure worker cooperative, only the workers own shares of the business on a one person, one vote basis, though hybrid forms exist in which consumers, community members or investors also own some shares (though these shares may or may not have voting power). In practice, control by worker-owners may be exercised through individual, collective or majority ownership by the workforce, or the retention of individual, collective or majority voting rights. A worker cooperative, therefore, has the characteristic that the majority of its workforce owns shares, and the majority of shares are owned by the workforce. Membership is not always compulsory for employees, but generally, only employees can become members either directly (as shareholders) or indirectly through membership of a trust that owns the company.

The impact of political ideology on practice constrains the development of cooperatives in different countries. In India, there is a form of workers' cooperative which insists on compulsory membership for all employees and compulsory employment for all members. That is the form of the Indian Coffee Houses. This system was advocated by the Indian communist leader A. K. Gopalan. In places like the UK, common ownership (indivisible collective ownership) was popular in the 1970s. Cooperative Societies only became legal in Britain after the passing of Slaney's Act in 1852. In 1865 there were 651 registered societies with a total membership of well over 200,000. There are now more than 400 worker cooperatives in the UK, Suma Wholefoods being the largest example with a turnover of £24 million. There also exist some pseudo-cooperatives, such as the John Lewis Partnership, where profits are distributed to the workers, but at the discretion of a senior elected board.

==== Business and employment cooperative ====
Business and employment cooperatives (BECs) are a subset of worker cooperatives that represent a new approach to providing support to the creation of new businesses. Like other business creation support schemes, BEC's enable budding entrepreneurs to experiment with their business idea while benefiting from a secure income. The innovation BECs introduce is that once the businesses are established, the entrepreneurs are not forced to leave and set up independently, but can stay and become full members of the cooperative. The micro-enterprises then combine to form one multi-activity enterprise whose members provide a mutually supportive environment for each other. BECs thus provide budding business people with an easy transition from inactivity to self-employment, but in a collective framework. They open up new horizons for people who have ambition but who lack the skills or confidence needed to set off entirely on their own – or who simply want to carry on an independent economic activity but within a supportive group context.

=== Purchasing cooperative ===
A "purchasing cooperative" is a type of cooperative arrangement, often among businesses, to agree to aggregate demand to get lower prices from selected suppliers. Retailers' cooperatives are a form of purchasing cooperative.

Major purchasing cooperatives include Best Western, ACE Hardware and CCA Global Partners.

Agricultural service cooperatives provide various services to their individual farming members, and to agricultural production cooperatives, where production resources such as land or machinery are pooled and members farm jointly.

Agricultural supply cooperatives aggregate purchases, storage, and distribution of farm inputs for their members. By taking advantage of volume discounts and using other economies of scale, supply cooperatives bring down members' costs. Supply cooperatives may provide seeds, fertilizers, chemicals, fuel, and farm machinery. Some supply cooperatives also operate machinery pools that provide mechanical field services (such as plowing, harvesting) to their members. Examples include the American cranberry-and-grapefruit cooperative Ocean Spray, collective farms in socialist states and the kibbutzim in Israel.

=== Producer cooperative ===
Producer cooperatives have producers as their members and provide services involved in moving a product from the point of production to the point of consumption. Unlike worker cooperatives, they allow businesses with multiple employees to join. Agricultural cooperatives and fishery cooperatives are such examples.

Agricultural marketing cooperatives operate a series of interconnected activities involving planning production, growing and harvesting, grading, packing, transport, storage, food processing, distribution and sale. Agricultural marketing cooperatives are often formed to promote specific commodities. Commercially successful agricultural marketing cooperatives include India's Amul (dairy products), which is the world's largest producer of milk and milk products, Dairy Farmers of America (dairy products) in the United States, and Malaysia's FELDA (palm oil).

Producer cooperatives may also be organized by small businesses for pooling their savings and accessing capital, for acquiring supplies and services, or for marketing products and services. Producer cooperatives among urban artisans were developed in the mid-19th-century in Germany by Franz Hermann Schulze-Delitzsch, who also promoted changes to the legal system (the Prussian Genossenschaftsgesetz of 1867) that facilitated such cooperatives. At about the same time, Friedrich Wilhelm Raiffeisen developed similar cooperatives among rural people.

Oxfam reported in 2026 on the development of a producer cooperative owned by Mekong Delta rice farmers which enabled producers to share the risks associated with poor harvests and avoid loss of income when yields were higher.

=== Multi-stakeholder cooperatives ===
Multi-stakeholder cooperatives include representation from different stakeholder groups, such as both consumers and workers.

==== Social cooperative ====
Cooperatives traditionally combine social benefit interests with capitalistic property-right interests. Cooperatives achieve a mix of social and capital purposes by democratically governing distribution questions by and between equal but not controlling members. Democratic oversight of decisions to equitably distribute assets and other benefits means capital ownership is arranged in a way for social benefit inside the organization. External societal benefit is also encouraged by incorporating the operating-principle of cooperation between co-operatives. In the final year of the 20th century, cooperatives banded together to establish a number of social enterprise agencies that have moved to adopt the multi-stakeholder cooperative model. In the years 1994–2009 the EU and its member nations gradually revised national accounting systems to "make visible" the increasing contribution of social economy organizations.

A particularly successful form of multi-stakeholder cooperative is the Italian "social cooperative", of which some 11,000 exist. (Note: In 2011 the official total was 11,264.) "Type A" social cooperatives bring together providers and beneficiaries of a social service as members. "Type B" social cooperatives bring together permanent workers and previously unemployed people who wish to integrate into the labor market. They are legally defined as follows:

- no more than 80% of profits may be distributed, interest is limited to the bond rate, and dissolution is altruistic (assets may not be distributed)
- the cooperative has legal personality and limited liability
- the objective is the general benefit of the community and the social integration of citizens
- those of type B integrate disadvantaged people into the labour market. The categories of disadvantage they target may include physical and mental disability, drug and alcohol addiction, developmental disorders and problems with the law. They do not include other factors of disadvantage such as unemployment, race, sexual orientation or abuse.
- type A cooperatives provide health, social or educational services
- various categories of stakeholder may become members, including paid employees, beneficiaries, volunteers (up to 50% of members), financial investors and public institutions. In type B cooperatives at least 30% of the members must be from the disadvantaged target groups
- voting is one person one vote

==== SCIC ====
The Société coopérative d'intérêt collective (SCIC) [Co-operative Society of Collective Interest] is a type of multi-stakeholder co-operative structure introduced in France in 1982. A SCIC must have at least three different categories of members, including users and employees. Other stakeholder groups that may be represented are volunteers, public authorities and other individual or corporate supporters. Voting is on a 'one member, one vote' basis, though voting in colleges is also provided for under certain circumstances.

SCICs must have a 'general interest' objective. Public bodies can subscribe for up to 20% of the capital. The status allows an association to convert into a co-operative without having to change its legal form. The relative rigidity of the structure, combined with the government's failure to grant tax relief, has limited its take-up.

==== Multi-stakeholding in retailing ====
Multi-stakeholder co-operatives also exist in the retail sector. An example is Färm, a Belgian wholefood retailing cooperative founded in 2015 which favours organic and local produce. It operates 16 shops, of which 11 are in Brussels.

===== Categories of members =====
The cooperative brings together all the participants in the food chain from farm to fork, represented by six different categories of members:

Investors
The people providing the financial means necessary to achieve the enterprise's ambitions, currently four of the project's founders. This category holds 94% of the shares but only exercises 50% of the votes. The board will consider applications from people wishing to invest in excess of €25,000;
Managers
The members of Färm's management;
Workers
Members of staff working at Färm, who currently number 36;
Sympathisers
Clients and people who want to support the project without having a contractual or commercial relationship with it. Anyone can become part of this category by buying shares worth a minimum of €105 (currently 5 shares of €21), and a maximum of €5,000. As of September 2020 the cooperative was not accepting new members;
Suppliers and producers
There is no obligation to hold shares in order to collaborate commercially with Färm, but the enterprise finds it nice that the two groups support each other;
Supporters
Self-employed people who have opened a store under the Färm brand.

===== Governance =====
Each member has one vote. The members elect the board of 10 at the annual general meeting. Each category of members has at least one board member to represent them.

An innovative governance provision ensure that no one group of members can dominate the others. In practice board decisions are taken by consensus. In the event of a vote, each director has one vote, and except where the cooperative's registered or internal rules provide otherwise, decisions are taken by simple majority of those present or represented. But in the event of a tie, if the votes of a group of voters all belong to the same category, the votes of the other categories prevail. To ensure that members are committed to the cooperative's values, vision and objectives, to guarantee its long-term finance and to limit financial speculation, shares are not transferable for a period of four years. Members receive a 2% discount on purchases.

==== New generation cooperative ====
New generation cooperatives (NGCs) are an adaptation of traditional cooperative structures to modern, capital intensive industries. They are sometimes described as a hybrid between traditional co-ops and limited liability companies or public benefit corporations. They were first developed in California and spread and flourished in the US Midwest in the 1990s. They are now common in Canada where they operate primarily in agriculture and food services, where their primary purpose is to add value to primary products. For example, producing ethanol from corn, pasta from durum wheat, or gourmet cheese from goat's milk.

=== Other ===
==== Platform cooperative ====
A platform cooperative, or platform co-op, is a cooperatively owned, democratically governed business that establishes a computing platform, and uses a protocol, website or mobile app to facilitate the sale of goods and services. Platform cooperatives are an alternative to venture capital-funded platforms insofar as they are owned and governed by those who depend on them most—workers, users, and other relevant stakeholders. Proponents of platform cooperativism claim that, by ensuring the financial and social value of a platform circulate among these participants, platform cooperatives will bring about a more equitable and fair digitally mediated economy in contrast with the extractive models of corporate intermediaries. Platform cooperatives differ from traditional cooperatives not only due to their use of digital technologies, but also by their contribution to the commons for the purpose of fostering an equitable social and economic landscape.

==== Volunteer cooperative ====
A volunteer cooperative is a cooperative that is run by and for a network of volunteers, for the benefit of a defined membership or the general public, to achieve some goal. Depending on the structure, it may be a collective or mutual organization, which is operated according to the principles of cooperative governance. The most basic form of volunteer-run cooperative is a voluntary association. A lodge or social club may be organized on this basis. A volunteer-run co-op is distinguished from a worker cooperative in that the latter is by definition employee-owned, whereas the volunteer cooperative is typically a non-stock corporation, volunteer-run consumer co-op or service organization, in which workers and beneficiaries jointly participate in management decisions and receive discounts on the basis of sweat equity.

==== Open cooperative ====
Open cooperatives are a type of cooperative that combine traditional cooperative principles with commons-based peer production, multi-stakeholder governance, and ethical market practices to serve broader collective and ecological goals. They aim to support collective ownership, democratic decision-making, and the creation of diverse types of commons, while also engaging with market mechanisms. Unlike conventional cooperatives, open cooperatives seek to balance economic sustainability with broader social and ecological goals. Their multi-stakeholder governance structures incorporate producers, consumers, and community members, thereby resisting reduction to narrow economic roles and addressing enduring cooperative tensions.

A defining feature of open cooperatives is their embrace of cosmolocalism—a model that circulates knowledge globally through digital commons while grounding production locally in shared infrastructures. Particularly active in sectors like agri-food, open cooperatives aim to revitalize local economies and construct viable alternatives to the corporate food system.

=== Federal or secondary cooperative ===
In some cases, cooperative societies find it advantageous to form cooperative federations in which all of the members are themselves cooperatives. Historically, these have predominantly come in the form of cooperative wholesale societies, and cooperative unions. Cooperative federations are a means through which cooperative societies can fulfill the sixth Rochdale Principle, cooperation among cooperatives, with the ICA noting that "Cooperatives serve their members most effectively and strengthen the cooperative movement by working together through local, regional and international structures."

==== Cooperative union ====
A second common form of cooperative federation is a cooperative union, whose objective (according to Gide) is "to develop the spirit of solidarity among societies and... in a word, to exercise the functions of a government whose authority, it is needless to say, is purely moral." Co-operatives UK and the International Cooperative Alliance are examples of such arrangements.

==== Cooperative political movements ====
In some countries with a strong cooperative sector, such as the UK, cooperatives may find it advantageous to form political groupings to represent their interests. The British Co-operative Party, the Canadian Cooperative Commonwealth Federation and United Farmers of Alberta are prime examples of such arrangements.

The British cooperative movement formed the Co-operative Party in the early 20th century to represent members of consumer cooperatives in Parliament, which was the first of its kind. The Co-operative Party now has a permanent electoral pact with the Labour Party meaning someone cannot be a member if they support a party other than Labour. Plaid Cymru also runs a credit union that is constituted as a co-operative, the Plaid Cymru Credit Union. UK cooperatives retain a strong market share in food retail, insurance, banking, funeral services, and the travel industry in many parts of the country, although this is still significantly lower than other business models.

Former leader of the British Labour Party Jeremy Corbyn has publicly expressed support for worker cooperatives.

== Working conditions ==
Cooperatives have been traditionally seen as an alternative to the traditional business model, in which a capitalist has the private ownership of the monetary capital and of the means of production and workers have to sell their labor force to the capitalist to earn a salary.

Cooperatives are often said to offer better working conditions than regular firms. This is demonstrated by the fact that cooperatives have a lower turnover rate (rate of workers leaving a firm) compared to regular firms. However, cooperatives do not always show improved working conditions compared to traditional businesses. In fact, the different nature of cooperatives imply that the nature of the working conditions within the cooperatives is also different.

According to Kunle Akingbola, working conditions are "the core elements of work relationships determined by the social, psychological, and physical factors that influence the workplace and the interaction that employees experience at work" and "typically include the nature of employment, working hours, job characteristics, compensation, work interactions, physical work environment, and written and unwritten work expectations".

According to Pam a Pam, a cooperative has good working conditions when it has stable contracts, working days consistent with the volume of tasks, and offers a higher salary than the established in the collective agreement of the sector.

=== Wages ===
In 2021, Hanson and Purushinkaya performed a survey on working conditions of cooperatives in the US, in which cooperativists expressed that they were making wages above the minimum for good living conditions. According to the report, they received, on average, $3.52 /hour more than at their previous job.

Research shows that, in the US, the 77% of the cooperatives have a 1:1 or 2:1 top-to-bottom pay ratio, whereas the average large corporation in the US has a CEO-to-worker pay ratio of 303:1. This means that in worker's cooperatives there is much more distribution of wealth between the members of the cooperatives, which means that workers that are at the bottom of the organizational pyramid make more money than workers that are at the bottom of the pyramid but that are in conventional firms.

Research also shows that the effect of output price changes on wage variations is positive for both conventional firms (CF) and cooperatives (WC), but larger in WCs than in CFs. This means that, because the distribution of wealth is much greater in WCs, an increase in the benefits of a WC usually is reflected in a proportional increase in the wages, whereas in CF this increase in the wages is much smaller (since the wealth is accumulated by people in the higher position, or is saved for new corporate investments).

However, the fact that the wealth is distributed between the already hired workers has the downside of preventing the cooperatives of hiring more workers, thus having a rate of creation of new jobs that is lower than CF. However, in WC changes on output prices does not translate in more employment, whereas in CF it does (CF create less employment).

Research shows that in times of crisis, employment and wages are more protected in WC than in conventional firms; since the focus of WCs is on protecting employment and because the workers that control the WC do not want to lose their jobs, WC are generally more willing to protect them. This does not happen so much in CF, where the focus is on maintaining the margin of benefits and not employment, which is considered a cost in times of crisis.

Research also shows that the difference of wages between workers hired by the cooperative and workers that are members of the cooperative is small (a worker can work for the cooperative but not be a member of it). Two explanations have been proposed: the first one is that the spirit of cooperativism also extends to hired workers; and the second that sometimes employees are needed for highly skilled jobs, which provides them with strong bargaining power enabling them to defend their employment positions and to compensate for their lack of formal control rights over the firm.

=== Stability of contracts ===
The formation of cooperatives has been used many times to create jobs in economically depressed sites. The communalization of wealth in poor areas often allows them to make the first investment in capital, which allows them to set the cooperative and start having benefits, thus producing an inflow of wealth in the community, which then is redistributed within the members of the cooperatives. This scheme of using cooperatives to create wealth and job opportunities in depressed areas has been famously used, for example, by the Mondragon Corporation, which has provided long term stable jobs for the population of Mondragon (Euskadi) since the mid-1950s.

The focus that cooperatives have in protecting jobs is reflected in research. Hanson and Prushinkaya have shown that, in the US, turnover rates are lower in WC than in CF (the turnover rate is the percentage of employees leaving a company within a certain period of time). Jobs at workers' cooperatives tend to be longer term.

There are several explanations for this: higher compensation and wages for workers; higher job satisfaction; greater adaptability to crisis and economic difficulties, etc. Research shows that WC show higher adaptability to crisis and economic hardships than CF. During negative demand shocks, WCs contain employment drop and allow a greater downward wage adjustment (the workers themselves decided to lower their own wages to keep the jobs). Another adaptability mechanism is the mutual support between WCs. The case of Cooperativa Mondragón is paradigmatic in this sense: during the 1980s, some cooperatives were experiencing financial difficulties, and Mondragon redeployed workers in the struggling co-operatives to ones that were better off. Those who were not redeployed were given income assistance that equaled 80% of their salary. The central control structure of Mondragon allowed for this to happen. This would have been unlikely to happen in unorganized and autonomous co-operatives. This same scheme to save employment prevented Fagor cooperative workers from losing their jobs when Fagor went bankrupt: they were relocated to other cooperatives of the Mondragon group.

=== Workload ===
Overworking due to the need for competitiveness applies to cooperatives as well. Some authors argue that the limitation of working hours in a cooperative should only apply for non-members workers of the coop (hired workers), whereas member workers should be allowed to work as much as they want, allowing the cooperative to collectively take those kind of decisions if they only apply to member workers.

=== Internal democracy ===
According to Pam a Pam, having internal democracy is not limited to having communal spaces of debate and decision making, but also ensuring that the participation in those spaces is not limited by issues of positionality, privilege, or rank.

For example, one of the basic issues with internal democracy is to make sure that every worker has access to all the information of the cooperative, and that is aware of every debate that is happening within the cooperative. It is important to make sure that all important decisions are taken in formal spaces, and avoid using informal spaces in which not everyone might be present to take those decisions.

This issue of having access and voice in the formal spaces for decision making of the cooperative becomes more important the bigger the cooperative gets. Research shows that, in larger cooperatives, member participation is lower than in smaller cooperatives, and there is a deterioration of internal democracy and working conditions for cooperative members and employees.

Mark Kaswan describes William Thompson's theory concerning cooperatives as: "[T]he cooperative structure alters the socio-economic relations of their members, aligning their interests with one another on the basis of a strong principle of equality. It is this alignment of interests on the basis of equality that gives cooperatives their strongly democratic character." According to Kaswan himself, internal democracy is mostly defined by the type and the size of the cooperative.

Mark Kaswan argues that the type of activity developed by a cooperative is one of the main factors that determines how democratic it is. For example, in worker cooperatives, the workers spend a lot of time in contact with each other, having a high level of both interaction and interdependency. In consumer's cooperatives, both the frequency and the intensity of the encounters is lower, thus reducing their democratic participation.

The size of the cooperative is considered to be one of the most important factors for internal democracy. For example, Robert Dahl argues that, as paraphrased by Kaswan, "assembly-style direct democracy can only effectively function in fairly small organisations". Kaswan states: "Increasing size also increases the complexity of management. [...] This can lead to the problem of 'managerialism', or the development of powerful officials whose concerns and interests may be different from those of common members." If the manager is already a worker-member of the cooperative, the problem might be resolved; but if the manager is hired specifically for managerial purposes, some hierarchies can arise. The contradiction with the issue of size comes with the social impact of the cooperative: greater size usually means greater social impact, but also has a toll on internal democracy.

=== Legal status of cooperative workers: employees or employed? ===
There is a legal debate on whether to consider being a member of a cooperative as a formal worker or not. For instance, it has been claimed that "the relationship of the worker-member with their cooperative should be considered as distinct from that of conventional wage-based dependent work and self-employed work". Some authors argue that cooperatives should have their own legal status differentiated from the legal status of a conventional firm, in order for them to get recognition and adapt the law to its unique features.

In Argentina, lawyers have debated whether the relationship between members in the worker cooperative also constitute an employment relationship to which the rules governing pais dependent work are applicable. Some say yes, mainly based on the argument that participation in the management and direction is not incompatible with the condition of subordination and that the individual is subordinated to the majority vote. However, other interpretations say that the link between members and the worker cooperatives is not a labor relation. In many law cases it has been widely adopted that the size of the cooperative is decisive for this question since the personal contribution of members is more important in small cooperatives.

In the US, the Internal Revenue Service determines whether a worker is an independent contractor by considering the degree that the worker:

- Receives less extensive instructions on the work to be done, but not how it should be done
- Receives training from the business about required procedures and methods
- Has significant investment in the work
- Is not reimbursed for some business expenses
- Has the opportunity to realize a profit or incur a loss
- Receives benefits from the business
- Has a written contract that shows the relationship the worker and business intend

The following factors are generally considered when determining whether an employment relationship exists under the FLSA:

- Is the worker performing work that is an integral part of the business?
- Do the worker's managerial skills affect the worker's opportunity for both profit and loss?
- What kinds of investment does the worker make in facilities and equipment compared to the employer?
- Does the worker exercise independent business judgement and initiative?
- Is the relationship with the employer indefinite, which suggests an ongoing employee relationship?
- What kind of control does the employer have about how the work is performed, pay amounts, hours worked, and whether the worker is free to also work for others and hire helpers?

=== The problem of labour fraud ===
However, the recognition of cooperatives as different entities than conventional firms sometimes creates a legal void that has been used regularly for labour fraud. For example, in Spain, cooperatives are not subjected to the sectoral collective agreements of each sector. In some cases, businesses take the form of a cooperative to avoid being subjected to collective agreements gained through trade unionism and syndicalism, thus being able to pay lower or have worse labor conditions than the ones stipulated in the collective agreement, while at the same time retaining the same power and salary pyramids.

Many cooperatives are accused of being instruments to be used to lay off workers, to out-source and to exploit workers and small producers. The "cooperativatisation" of both public and private sector activities in some countries has been accompanied by a deterioration of working conditions. This is due both to the perversion of the cooperative form and to weak labour regulations applied to these kinds of work forms.

Usually, the law establishes that a cooperative is required to have a minimum percentage of workers-owners (usually 33%). Cooperatives can hire workers that are not part of the cooperative, but the law usually establishes a maximum amount of time that they can work in the cooperative without being members of it; after that, cooperatives are legally obliged to make those workers part of the cooperative. Some cooperatives commit labour fraud because they either have a smaller percentage of cooperativised workers than mandated by law, or they have people working without becoming members for more time than legally allowed.

In Spain, since the law does not subject cooperatives to the collective agreements or to the social security regulations, the following scheme has been used: if a business wants to pay less than what the sector agreement of its economic sector establishes, the business can create a cooperative, which is not subjected to it, hire all the workers using that cooperative, and then outsource the activity to this cooperative. In this way, instead of having to hire all the workers directly (thus having to pay the Social Security fees and the minimum wage established by the collective agreement), the company only has to use the cooperative as a shell company, and in this way it does not have to pay according to the agreement, and since the workers are hired by the cooperative and not by the company, they are not subject to the either the sector agreement or social security. This is the case, for example, of Spain's Servicarne Coop, hired by meat industries such as Coren and Sada, which according to the Audiencia Nacional "does not carry out a cooperative activity" and "has not been established with the purpose of fulfilling the objectives set forth in the Cooperatives Law [...] but only with the aim of obtaining certain benefits that are linked to it, creating a merely formal appearance of a cooperative", for example, to avoid paying the Social Security fees.

Potential solutions to this fraudulent usage of workers' cooperatives have been suggested, such as covering the legal void that allows this to happen, creating cooperative federations that ensure the cooperative identity and its regular functioning, etc.

== Economic performance ==
=== Job productivity ===
In general terms, research shows that productivity in worker's cooperatives is higher than in conventional firms. For example, Fakhfakh et al. (2012) show that in several industries, conventional firms would produce more with their current levels of employment and capital when they adopted the employee-owned firms' way of organising.

One explanation is that commitment to the cause causes more productivity. The fact that employees can participate in decision-making motivates them to be more involved with the objectives of the cooperative.

Another explanation is that the collective work environment enhances job satisfaction, thus augmenting productivity. Research has shown that collectivists working in simulated collectivist cultures do in fact produce more cooperative behavior than do individualists (i.e., those low in collectivism) in these cultures. Furthermore, it has been argued that collectivists' ideological commitment to the group members yields higher levels of motivation. Consequently, in addition to making turnover less likely, high collectivism in the WC environment should translate to high performance.

=== Economic stability ===
Capital and the Debt Trap reports that "cooperatives tend to have a longer life than other types of enterprise, and thus a higher level of entrepreneurial sustainability". This resilience has been attributed to how cooperatives share risks and rewards between members, how they harness the ideas of many and how members have a tangible ownership stake in the business. Additionally, "cooperative banks build up counter-cyclical buffers that function well in case of a crisis," and are less likely to lead members and clients towards a debt trap (p. 216). This is explained by their more democratic governance that reduces perverse incentives and subsequent contributions to economic bubbles.

==== In Europe ====
A 2012 report published by CICOPA (Europe) showed that in France and Spain, worker cooperatives and social cooperatives "have been more resilient than conventional enterprises during the economic crisis".

A 2013 report by ILO concluded that cooperative banks outperformed their competitors during the 2008 financial crisis. The cooperative banking sector had 20% market share of the European banking sector, but accounted for only 7 percent of all the write-downs and losses between the third quarter of 2007 and the first quarter of 2011. Cooperative banks were also over-represented in lending to small and medium-sized businesses in all of the 10 countries included in the report.

A 2017 report published by the Office for National Statistics found that, in the UK, the rate of survival of cooperatives after 5 years was 80 percent compared with only 41 percent for other enterprises. A further study found that after 10 years, 44 percent of cooperatives were still in operation, compared with only 20 percent for other enterprises.

==== In North America ====
===== In the United States of America =====
In a 2007 study by the World Council of Credit Unions, the five-year survival rate of cooperatives in the United States was found to be 90% in comparison to 3–5% for traditional businesses. Credit unions, a type of cooperative bank, had five times lower failure rate than other banks during the 2008 financial crisis and more than doubled lending to small businesses between 2008 and 2016, from $30 billion to $60 billion, while lending to small businesses overall during the same period declined by around $100 billion. Public trust in credit unions stands at 60%, compared to 30% for big banks and small businesses are five times less likely to be dissatisfied with a credit union than with a big bank.

===== In Canada =====
A 2010 report by the Ministry of Economic Development, Innovation and Export in Québec found the five-year survival rate and ten-year survival rate of cooperatives in Québec to be 62% and 44% respectively compared to 35% and 20% for conventional firms. Another report by the BC-Alberta Social economy Research Alliance found that the three-year survival rate of cooperatives in Alberta to be 81.5% in comparison to 48% for traditional firms. Another report by the aforementioned Research Alliance found that in British Columbia, the five-year survival rates for cooperatives between 2000 and 2010 to be 66.6% in comparison to conventional businesses that had 43% and 39% in the years 1984 and 1993 respectively.

== Cooperative financing ==
The issue of finance in cooperativism is one of the most importance. Since the failure rates of cooperatives are lower than for conventional firms, the financing schemes used by them are at least as successful as for conventional firms.

One of the success factors lies in the fact that cooperatives use a different arrange of financing schemes

=== Self financing (social base) ===
According to Gianluca Salvatore and Riccardo Bodini, self-financing schemes include the act and the practice of using one's own capital to provide funding for an enterprise. The main advantage of self-financing is that it sets the cooperative free from outside influence and debt, but the capacity to expand the coop might be constrained by the lack of capital.

==== Capital by members ====
This is the main form of financing in cooperatives. Usually, workers cooperatives do not only socialize the labor force, but also a part of the economical wealth of each member, that is put in a pool together with the rest of contributions, and that constitutes the capital of the cooperative. Usually, future members have to socialize a certain amount of money to the cooperative before they can become formal members.

The most common way to do it all at once before joining the cooperative, but other financing schemes have been proposed. For example, some cooperatives do not ask for an initial investment, but rather require workers to work for a certain period of time, while retaining a percentage of the wage, until the worker has paid all the requirements and can become a formal member of the cooperative.

Usually, when the worker decides to leave the cooperative, all the money invested will be returned to the worker.

The amount required will vary depending on a lot of factors, such as for example:

- The type of cooperative: if it is a big industrial cooperative, the amount required will probably be higher than for a small services cooperative.
- The current budget of the cooperative: if a cooperative is already economically well established, probably the requirements will be lower. However, if the cooperative is still young and still requires a lot of investments, the initial requirement will be higher.

==== Social loans ====
Occasionally. if the situation requires it, workers of the cooperative can decide to put some more money as an investment, which can later be returned.

=== Cooperative resources ===
==== Gross profits ====
If the cooperative is based on selling products or services, a part of the finance comes from the profits that they get from their activities.

==== Proceeds from assets ====
A cooperative can have different assets from which it can get money without having to sell those assets. For example, if the cooperative has money in the bank, and the bank gives interests, it can generate some more money. Or for example, if the cooperative owns a place and rents it, it can get some more money out of it.

==== Balance sheet assets ====
Assets can also be converted to money. For example, if the cooperative owns shares of another company, they can sell them and turn them into liquidity. Or if the cooperative owns a building, it can sell it. Different types of assets can be converted to liquidity with different levels of ease: for example, selling shares is easier and less time-consuming than selling land, which might take months. Thus, shares are much more easily converted to liquidity than land.

=== Financial grants ===
Financial grants, that are awards typically given by foundations or governments, can also be a source of financiation for cooperatives. They differ from loans in the fact that under most conditions they do not have to be paid back. Some grants have waiting periods before the grantee can take full ownership of them.

==== Donations ====
They are usually in the form of cash, but can also be in the form of other assets. Donations are specially recommendable if the cooperative has a strong aim for social impact and mutual aid, in which case individual or collective donors might be interested in donating.

==== Crowdfunding ====
Crowdfunding is a way of sourcing money for a project by asking a large number of contributors to individually donate a small amount to it. In return, the backers may receive token rewards that increase in prestige as the size of the donation increases.

A successful example of how to finance a workers cooperative with a crowdfunding is the case of the cooperative of the Collettivo di Fabbrica GKN – Insorgiamo!, who, after occupying and taking back the control of a GKN factory in Florence, they began a crowdfunding campaign to get the initial money needed to create a cooperative that included all the workers that previously worked there. They used that money to make the initial investments to reconvert the factory to manufacture bicycle parts, with a sustainability goal.

==== Foundations and Governments financing ====
Especially for SSE cooperatives, one way to get finance is getting grants from governments or private organizations. The latter are usually related to philanthropy. The difference with other types of grants is that they do not require any previous conditions of challenges that need to be achieved.

==== Challenge grants ====
Challenge grants are funds disbursed by governments, foundations and trusts on completion of challenge requirements. The challenge refers to the actions or results that must be achieved before money is released. The challenge could require a new solution to an existing problem that had been ignored. Additional requirements could be specified, from programme certification to member participation. An example of a challenge grant would be money that is given by a bank if the cooperative increases membership by a certain amount.

=== Lending ===
Lending or debt instruments provide borrowers with funding in exchange for repayment of this funding along with interest, based on predetermined timeframes and interest rate terms. The provision of funding might require guarantees.

==== Concessional/Flexible Loans ====
Concessional and flexible loans include special features such as no or low interest rates, extended repayment schedules, and interest rate modifications during the life of the loan.

==== Crowdlending ====
Crowd lending, also known as peer-to-peer lending, is the practice of lending money through online services that directly match lenders with borrowers. Lenders can earn higher returns compared to savings and investment products offered by banks, while borrowers can borrow money at lower interest rates.

==== Social bonds ====
For example, when the bank provides sums of money as donations or financing at competitive conditions in support of initiatives that favour social innovation.

=== Equity investments ===
An equity investment is money that is invested in a company by purchasing shares of that company. Some cooperatives use that as a source of money. In cooperatives equity investments are usually not used, since it is something that is generally believed to go against the principles of cooperativism (the Rochdale Principles themselves limit the equity investments).

==== Direct equity investment ====
Direct capital contribution to a project without the guarantee of repayment; the return on a direct equity investment will depend on the performance of a project/company over the investment period.

==== Financing members ====
Especially at the start of a cooperative, this is used in some cases. It involves a person or a legal entity that, with a financial contribution, favours the establishment of a company and the carrying out of the social activity. Typically, they make part of the initial investment, and once the company is established, they resell all or part of the subscribed shares.

==== Other forms of equity investments ====
Other forms of equity investments used by cooperatives are: equity funds/mutual fund, quasi-equity, equity crowdfunding, social venture capital/impact investing, patient capital, etc.

=== Redistribution of profit ===
Through all these financial means, a cooperative can create a financial profit. The next set of critical financial decisions becomes how to distribute that profit. There are different forms of redistributing the benefit.

==== Capital reinvestment ====
Usually, growing the business is not the main goal of a cooperative (the main goal is to redistribute profit among its members), but sometimes it is necessary to reinvest a part of the profits in the form of new capital, which will allow the cooperative to expand its operations and increase profit in the future. This is especially true during the initial steps of the cooperative, in which its operations have to grow to the point in which they have regained the initial capital investment. The capital reinvestments are decided collectively through the democratic mechanisms that a cooperative has.

==== Patronage refund ====
Patronage refunds are the distribution of profits to the members of the cooperative, who have previously invested money in the form of capital by members and social loans.

==== Dividends ====
The Rochdale principles state that cooperatives should have limited return on equity investments, so its usual for most of the cooperatives to not use equity investments, and, if they do, pay few dividends to the shareholders. The main reason for which they do that is that distributing profits as dividends reduces the potential amount of patronage refunds.

==== Unallocated Retained Earnings, or "cushion fund" ====
Part of the benefits of a cooperative must be saved as a safe fund, which will allow the cooperative to face unexpected situations and crises if they appear.

=== Redistribution of losses ===
In case that a cooperative experiences a loss, there are alternatives to handle them in the most efficient way possible.

==== Make use of the "cushion funds" ====
If a cooperative has had profits at some point, it should have some savings, which it can use in times of economic losses. In this way, they can absorb the losses simply with the money they already had, not having to affect neither wages, employment, or stocks.

==== Allocate the losses to the members ====
This is one of the most common ways to allocate the losses. Making this decision involves the workers deliberating through the stablished democratic mechanisms on how are the losses going to be distributed among membership.

In times of economic hardships, cooperatives are more willing to reduce their wages rather than reduce employment, whereas conventional firms would rather fire some people and keep the same wages for the rest of them.

== Job satisfaction ==
Castel et al.. (2011) performed research on job satisfaction in workers cooperatives, and it determined that job satisfaction is high in workers cooperatives and that social economy values are a source of job satisfaction. Within those types of organizations there are several intrinsic and extrinsic factors that perform in a very characteristic manner, and which are key for job satisfaction.

The intrinsic factors are characteristics of the work itself, and Castel et al. proposes that cooperatives create job satisfaction because they usually involve:

- Reducing the gap between the conception and execution of tasks
- Increasing task significance (making work meaningful)
- Developing workers' skills
- Seeking to benefit the global environment and society while involving everyone

The extrinsic factors that make work in coops satisfying are:

- A higher level of shared business culture
- Increased confidence in elected management
- Greater attention to working and employment conditions following the increased social responsibility of the company
- Collective decision-making.

However, that research also indicates that not all of the characteristics of workers cooperatives increase job satisfaction. In fact, they point out that some characteristics are prejudicial to mental health, such as the perceived increase in work pressure (some workers feel that since they are the owners of their means of production, they are pressured into working more by other colleagues), or the ambiguity of the relationship between other workers (everyone being in the same decision-making position can create conflicts among workers).

Hanson and Prushinkaya (2021) conducted a survey that found similar results: they found that, in general, cooperativists state high job satisfaction, autonomy and voice, and professional development. They also found that the majority of individual respondents described their job security, job satisfaction, work effort, and the economic stability of the company as somewhat or much better than what they experienced in their last job. Also, a majority reported the quality of supervision, feedback, and training was superior in their co-op job. Their research also showed that within co-ops, training and skill-building matters for democratic governance: workers who received cooperative-specific training participated more in workplace decision making.

Another research also shows that worker cooperatives are still beneficial for job satisfaction even if their activity is in no sense related to the social and solidarity economy or has no social purpose at all. According to Hyungsik Eum this is because "in worker cooperatives, worker-members have a sense of ownership of their own jobs and workplaces".

== Women in cooperatives ==
Since cooperatives are based on values like self-help, democracy, equality, equity, and solidarity, they can play a particularly strong role in empowering women, especially in developing countries. Cooperatives allow women who might have been isolated and working individually to band together and create economies of scale as well as increase their own bargaining power in the market. In statements in advance of International Women's Day in early 2013, President of the ICA Dame Pauline Green stated, "Cooperative businesses have done so much to help women onto the ladder of economic activity. With that comes community respect, political legitimacy and influence."

However, despite the intended democratic structure of cooperatives and the values and benefits shared by members, due to traditional gender norms on the role of women, and other instilled cultural practices that sidestep attempted legal protections, women and other disadvantaged groups suffer a disproportionately low representation in cooperative membership around the world. Representation of women through active membership (showing up to meetings and voting), as well as in leadership and managerial positions is even lower.

Some of the patriarchal behaviors that can be found in cooperatives involve the formal structures and hierarchy that conform the cooperative:

- Non-open and non-democratic decision-making: democratic spaces are often co-opted by men, who occupy most of the space, and tend to monopolize the leadership of those democratic spaces. This can result in women having less voice in the cooperative decision making, thus having their needs underrepresented.
- Exclusionary leadership: in some occasions, the management of cooperatives involves electing leaders for specific purposes. The under-representation of women in the democratic spaces can result in them having a smaller chance of being elected as representatives or leaders. Statistics show that women are still underrepresented in responsibility jobs in co-ops.
- Interpersonal relationships: patriarchal behavior can also be found in male colleagues, who often, for example, act in patronizing ways, or have distrust in women's capacity to perform certain jobs.

The strongest manifestations of machismo in cooperatives are:

- Manifestations of machismo that belittle, offend and detract from security and autonomy. They involve a higher level of degradation.
- Sexual violence is often hidden by the false supposition that in cooperatives everything is shared and done collectively, which may create an environment that hides sexual violence.

== Cooperatives in popular culture ==
As of 2012, the number of memberships in cooperatives reached one billion, and so the organizational structure and movement has seeped into popular culture.

However, in comparison with the number of co-operatives, they are rarely the subject of literature. Among these, Ken Follett mentions their role in working-class life during World War I in Fall of Giants (2010), the first volume of his Century Trilogy:

"Where's our mam?"
"Gone down the Co-op for a tin of jam."

The local grocery was a co-operative store, sharing profits among its customers. Such shops were popular in South Wales, although no one knew how to pronounce Co-op, variations ranging from "cop" to "quorp".

Less seriously, in Murder in the Collective, Barbara Wilson sets a murder mystery among radical printing collectives in Seattle, while Frances Madeson's 2007 comic novel Cooperative Village is set in the eponymous housing co-operative in New York.

In the HBO drama television series The Wire, several drug dealers create a democratic alliance called the New Day Co-Op with the interests of cutting back on violence and increasing business.

Co-opoly: The Game of Cooperatives is a board game by TESA Collective played throughout the globe that challenges players to work together to start and run a cooperative and overcome major hurdles.

Cooperatives feature prominently in the Martian economy in Kim Stanley Robinson's Mars trilogy and in a speculative future Earth economy in his novel The Ministry for the Future.

== See also ==
- Artist cooperative
- Co-determination
  - Worker representation on corporate boards of directors
- Cooperative economics
- Collective ownership
- Cohousing
- Common ownership
- Corporatism
- Cost the limit of price
- Danish cooperative movement
- Decentralized autonomous organization
- Distributism
- Employee stock ownership
  - Employee stock ownership plan
- Friendly society
- Intentional community
- List of co-operative federations
- List of cooperatives
- Los Horcones (a producer cooperative & Walden Two)
- Market socialism
- Microfinance / microcredit
- Mondragón Cooperative Corporation
- Mutual organization
- Mutual Ownership Defense Housing Division
- Mutualism (economic theory)
- Neo-capitalism
- Participatory democracy
- Participatory economics
- Polytechnic University of the Philippines College of Cooperatives and Social Development
- Socialism
- Social corporatism
- Social ownership
- Stock exchange cooperative
- Syndicalism

== Bibliography ==
- Ratner, Carl (February 2015). "Neoliberal Co-optation of Leading Co-op Organizations, and a Socialist Counter-Politics of Cooperation". Monthly Review. Vol. 66, no. 9. Archived from the original on 9 February 2015.
- Marcuse, Peter (February 2015). "Cooperatives On the Path to Socialism?". Monthly Review. Vol. 66, no. 9. Archived from the original on 9 February 2015.
- "2003 Facts and Figures" (PDF). co-op.or.jp. Japanese Consumers' Co-operative Union. 2003. Archived from the original (PDF) on 15 May 2005.
- Takamura, Isao (1995). "Japan: Consumer Co-op Movement in Japan". uwcc.wisc.edu. International Co-operative Information Centre. Archived from the original on 14 February 2008.
- Armitage, S. (October 1991). "Consequences of Mutual Ownership for Building Societies". The Service Industries Journal. 11 (4). 4: 471. doi:10.1080/02642069100000069.
- Birchall, Johnston (1997). The International Co-operative Movement.
- Brazda, Johann; Schediwy, Robert, eds. (1989). Consumer Co-operatives in a Changing World. ICA.
- Bernardi, A; Monni, S, eds. (2016). "The Co-operative Firm – Keywords". ojs.romatrepress.uniroma3.it. Rome: RomaTrE-Press. Archived from the original on 21 September 2016.
- "Co-operation 1921–1947". Cooperative League of America. Archived from the original on 20 May 2008 – via uga.edu.
- Cornforth, C. J.; et al. (1988). Developing Successful Worker Co-ops. London Sage Publications.
- Curl, John (2009). For All The People: Uncovering the Hidden History of Cooperation, Cooperative Movements, and Communalism in America. PM Press.
- Dana, Leo Paul (January 2010). "Nunavik, Arctic Quebec: Where Co-operatives Supplement Entrepreneurship". Global Business and Economics Review. 12 (1–2) 32317: 42–71. doi:10.1504/GBER.2010.032317.
- Derr, Jascha (2013). The cooperative movement of Brazil and South Africa (PDF). Archived from the original (PDF) on 23 February 2014 – via rosalux.co.za.
- Emerson, John (August 2005). "Consider the Collective: More than business as usual". backspace.com. Archived from the original on 19 November 2010.
- Gide, Charles (1922). "Consumers' Co-operative Societies". Archived from the original on 20 May 2008 – via uga.edu.
- Holyoake, George Jacob (1908). "The History of Co-operation". Archived from the original on 20 May 2008 – via uga.edu.
- Llewellyn, D.; Holmes, M. (1991). "In Defence of Mutuality: A Redress to an Emerging Conventional Wisdom". Annals of Public and Co-operative Economics. 62 (3): 327. doi:10.1111/j.1467-8292.1991.tb01490.x.
- Masulis, R. (1987). "Changes in Ownership Structure: Conversions of Mutual Savings and Loans to Stock Charter". Journal of Financial Economics. 18: 32. doi:10.1016/0304-405X(87)90060-2.
- Paton, R. (1989). Reluctant Entrepreneurs. Open University Press.
- Rasmusen, E. (October 1988). "Mutual banks and stock banks". Journal of Law and Economics. 31: 412.
- Van Deusen, David (2006). "Co-ops: The Changing Face of Employment in the Green Mountains". Z Magazine. Archived from the original on 14 July 2014 – via community-wealth.org.
- Vicari, S (2015). "2014 Annual Report on FAO's projects and activities in support of producer organizations and cooperatives" (PDF). fao.org. Food and Agriculture Organization of the United Nations. Archived from the original (PDF) on 17 October 2016.
- Vieta, Marco, ed. (2010). "The New Cooperativism". Affinities: A Journal of Radical Theory, Culture, and Action. 4 (1). Archived from the original on 27 September 2010 – via journals.sfu.ca.
- Warbasse, James Peter (1950). Cooperative Peace. Archived from the original on 20 October 2014 – via uga.edu.
- Warbasse, James Peter (1941). Problems of Cooperation. Archived from the original on 20 May 2008 – via uga.edu.
- Whyte, W. F.; Whyte, K. K. (1991). Making Mondragon. Ithaca, New York: ILR Press.
- Zeuli, Kimberly A.; Cropp, Robert (2004). Cooperatives: Principles and practices in the 21st century. Archived from the original on 29 August 2006 – via uwcc.wisc.edu.
- "Understanding Cooperatives". cooperativenetwork.coop. Archived from the original on 2 July 2010., a curriculum on cooperative business for secondary school students.
- "India: Re-inventing cooperatives by increasing youth involvement". southasia.oneworld.net. Archived from the original on 25 February 2011.
- Galor, Zvi. "Production Cooperative – A Tool for National Development". Coop Dialogue. 4 (1–2). ICA ROAP: 13–33.
