= Mary Maxwell =

Mary Maxwell may refer to:

- Mary Maxwell (Bahá'í) (1910–2000), Rúhíyyih Khanum, Baha'i Hand of the Cause of God, and wife of Shoghi Effendi
- Mary Maxwell, wife of Charles Stuart, 4th Earl of Traquair
- Mary Maxwell Campbell (1812–1886), Scottish songwriter, composer, and poet
- Mary Maxwell-Channell (1914–2012), English engineer and businesswoman
- Mary Maxwell Gates (1929–1994), American banker, civic activist, non-profit executive, and schoolteacher; mother of Bill Gates
- Mary Maxwell Hathorn (1884–1935), American osteopathic physician
- Mary Beth Maxwell, founding executive director of American Rights at Work
- Mary Maxwell (writer) (1835–1915), née Mary Elizabeth Braddon, English novelist
