= American Rights at Work =

U.S. nonprofit organization

- Company type: Conglomerate
- Founded: 2003; U.S.
- Founder: AFL-CIO
- Headquarters: U.S.

American Rights at Work (ARAW) was a U.S. self-described nonpartisan, nonprofit organization that advocates for workers and their right to form unions without interference.

ARAW received funding from unions affiliated with both the AFL-CIO and the Change to Win coalition, but its board of directors and day-to-day activities are not controlled by either labor group.

American Rights at Work merged with Jobs With Justice in 2012.

== Leadership ==
The chair of the organization's board, David Bonior, took a leave of absence in December 2006 to chair the presidential election campaign of former U.S. Senator John Edwards. Other board members include Julian Bond and Bradley Whitford.

The executive director of ARAW is Kimberly Freeman Brown. The founding executive director was Mary Beth Maxwell.

== See also ==
- Labor movement
- Labor history of the United States
