= TESA Collective =

American worker co-op

- Toolbox for Education and Social Action
- Abbreviation: TESA
- Formation: 2008
- Type: Worker cooperative
- Purpose: Social justice education through games and tools
- Location: Western Massachusetts
- Products: Board games; Educational programs; Documentaries; Interactive webinars
- Website: www.tesacollective.com

TESA Collective (Toolbox for Education and Social Action) is a worker-owned co-op that designs games and tools for social justice organizations. TESA consciously engages in ethical, social change practices that intend to create healthier communities.

== Social change games ==
Creating and publishing games that address issues of social and economic change is a growing trend. TESA develops projects ranging from board games, to documentaries, to interactive webinars. In cooperative games, everyone wins or everyone loses.

== Games ==
Co-opoly is a board game that teaches players the ins and outs of negotiating a Cooperative business.

In Rise Up: The Game of People and Power, players build a social movement and take on an oppressive system.

Space Cats Fight Fascism is the fourth in a series of social justice games from the TESA Collective.

TESA Collective and Jobs with Justice funded a labor organizing game on Kickstarter. In STRIKE!: The Game of Worker Rebellion, players grow their ranks, mobilize workers, and organize strikes around their city. The campaign for the game ran during a union drive at Kickstarter.

== See also ==
- Games for Change
