= Mary Beth Maxwell =

American government official

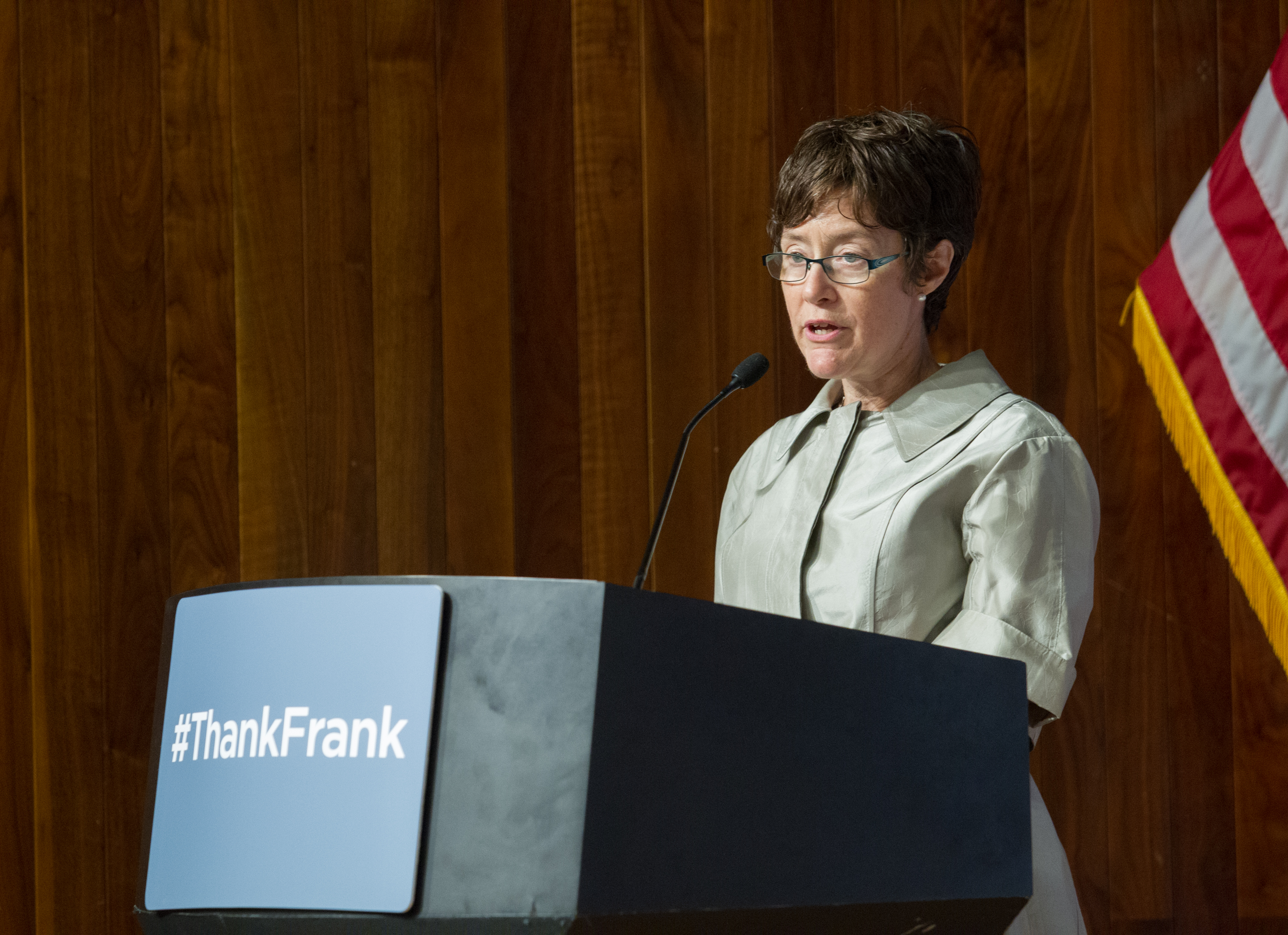

Principal deputy assistant secretary for policy
- President: Barack Obama

Personal details
- Education: Marquette University

Mary Beth Maxwell was the founding executive director of American Rights at Work and the author of the organization's inaugural report. Maxwell was chosen in April 2009 by President Barack Obama to be senior advisor in the United States Department of Labor.

While at Labor she has served as both the acting administrator of the U.S. Department of Labor's Wage and Hour Division, and principal deputy assistant secretary for policy.

== Career ==
Maxwell previously served as national field director for Jobs with Justice, where she helped quadruple the number of local affiliates, with similar growth in the organization's national staff. As a result, the organization engaged new allies, mobilized support, and built relationships with stakeholders to broaden and strengthen the causes of worker and economic justice.

Prior to Jobs with Justice, she was deputy field director for NARAL Pro-Choice America, directing the pro-choice organization’s electoral, legislative, media and fundraising training programs for local affiliates. She also served as field director for the United States Student Association where she designed field programs to organize students in targeted congressional districts to impact higher education policy, and managed a leadership development and grassroots action program, which mobilized thousands of students.

She currently sits on the board of directors of The Discount Foundation.

Maxwell was rumored to be a serious candidate for Secretary of Labor in Barack Obama's administration. She would have been the first openly lesbian cabinet secretary. Instead, Obama selected Hilda Solis, a member of Congress.

== Personal life and education ==
Maxwell lives in Washington D.C., with her seven-year-old adopted son. Maxwell earned a BA in English, philosophy and political science from Marquette University.
