= Public company =

Company that offers its securities for sale to the general public

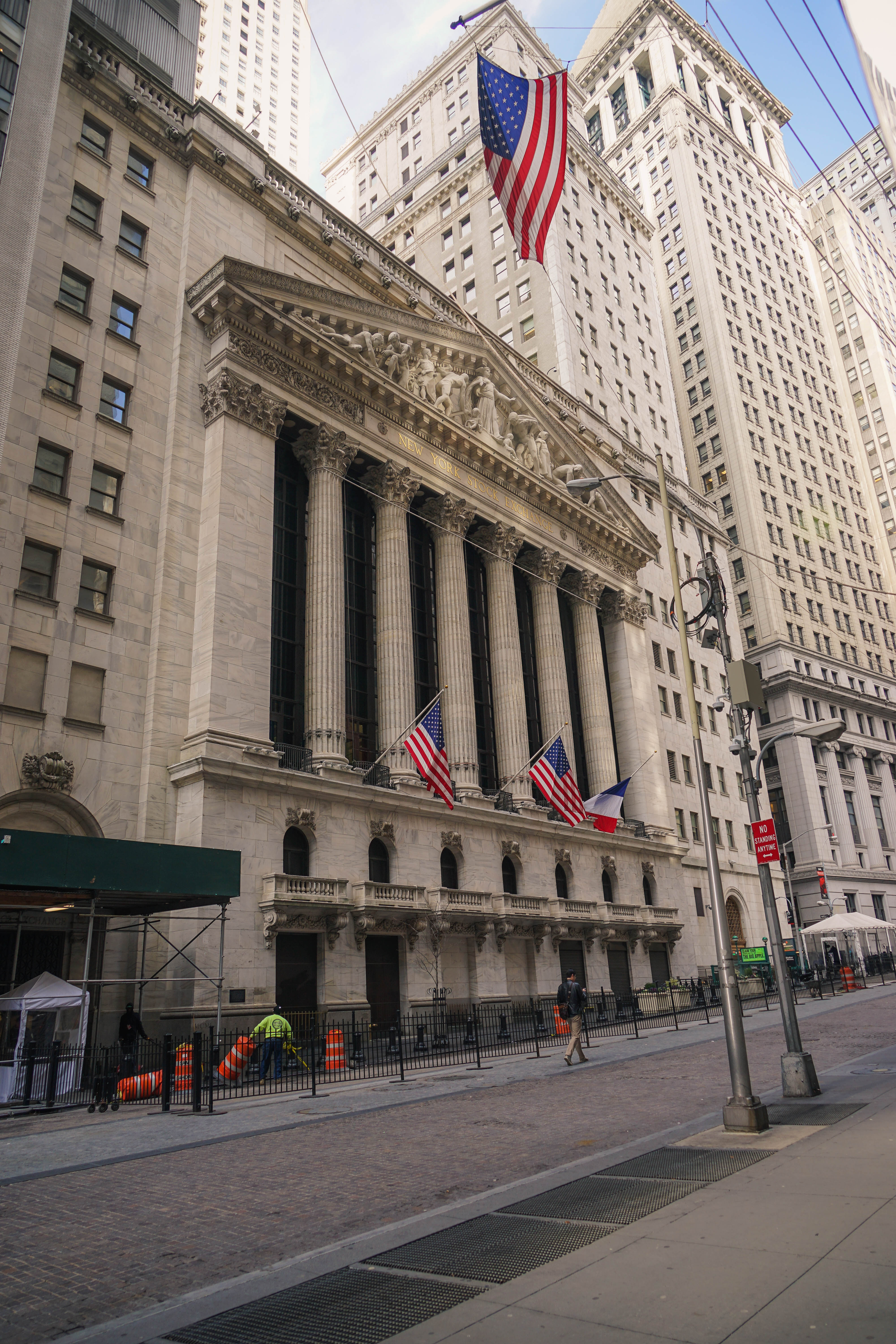
The New York Stock Exchange Building in 2015

A public company (Note: Also named publicly traded company, publicly held company, publicly listed company, publicly owned company or public limited company) is a company whose ownership is organized via shares of stock which are intended to be freely traded on a stock exchange or in over-the-counter markets. A public (publicly traded) company can be listed on a stock exchange (listed company), which facilitates the trade of shares, or not (unlisted public company). In some jurisdictions, public companies over a certain size must be listed on an exchange. In most cases, public companies are private enterprises in the private sector, and "public" emphasizes their reporting and trading on the public markets.

Public companies are formed within the legal systems of particular states and therefore have associations and formal designations that are distinct and separate within the polity in which they reside. In the United States, for example, a public company is usually a type of corporation, though a corporation need not be a public company. In the United Kingdom, it is usually a public limited company (PLC). In France, it is a société anonyme (SA). In Germany, it is an Aktiengesellschaft (AG). While the general idea of a public company may be similar, the differences between types are meaningful and are at the core of international law disputes with regard to industry and trade.

== Securities ==
Usually, the securities of a publicly traded company are owned by many investors while the shares of a privately held company are owned by relatively few shareholders. A company with many shareholders is not necessarily a publicly traded company. Conversely, a publicly traded company typically (but not necessarily) has many shareholders. In the United States, an issuer generally must register a class of equity securities under the Securities Exchange Act of 1934 if it has more than $10 million in total assets and the class is held of record by either 2,000 or more persons or 500 or more persons who are not accredited investors.

== Advantages and disadvantages ==
=== Advantages ===
Publicly traded companies are able to raise funds and capital through the sale (in the primary market or secondary market) of shares of stock. Prior to their existence, it was very difficult to obtain large amounts of capital for private enterprises, as significant capital could come only from a smaller set of wealthy investors or banks willing to risk typically large investments. The profit on stock is gained in form of dividends or capital gains to the holders.

The financial media, analysts, and the public are able to access additional information about the business, since the business is commonly legally bound, and naturally motivated (so as to secure further capital), to disseminate public information regarding the financial status and future of the company to its many shareholders and the government.

Because many people have a vested interest in the company's success, the company may be more popular or recognizable than a private company.

The initial shareholders of the company are able to share risk by selling shares to the public. For example, the founder of Facebook, Mark Zuckerberg, owned 29.3% of the company's class A shares in 2013, which gave him enough voting power to control the business and allowed Facebook to raise capital from and to distribute risk to the remaining shareholders. Facebook had been a privately held company prior to its initial public offering in 2012.

If some shares are given to managers or other employees, potential conflicts of interest between employees and shareholders (an instance of principal–agent problem) will be remitted. As an example, in many tech companies, entry-level software engineers are given stock in the company upon being hired and so they become shareholders. Therefore, the engineers have a vested interest in the company succeeding financially and are incentivized to work harder and more diligently to ensure that success.

Public companies have fiduciary duty to their shareholders, in addition to the directors' fiduciary duty to the company itself.

=== Disadvantages ===
Many stock exchanges require that publicly traded companies have their accounts regularly audited by outside auditors and then publish the accounts to their shareholders. Besides the cost, that may make useful information available to competitors. Various other annual and quarterly reports are also required by law. In the United States, the Sarbanes–Oxley Act imposes additional requirements. The requirement for audited books is not imposed by the exchange known as OTC Pink. The shares may be maliciously held by outside shareholders and the original founders or owners may lose benefits and control. The principal–agent problem, or the agency problem is a key weakness of public companies. The separation of a company's ownership and control is especially prevalent in such countries as the United Kingdom and the United States.

== Stockholders ==
In the United States, the Securities and Exchange Commission requires firms whose stock is traded publicly to report their major shareholders each year. The reports identify all institutional shareholders (primarily firms that own stock in other companies), all company officials who own shares in their firm, and all individuals or institutions owning more than 5% of the firm's stock.

== General trend ==
For many years, newly created companies were initially privately held but later held initial public offerings to become publicly traded companies, or they were acquired by another company if they became larger and more profitable or had promising prospects. More infrequently, some companies such as the investment banking firm Goldman Sachs and the logistics services provider United Parcel Service (UPS) chose to remain privately held for a long period of time after maturity into a profitable company.

However, from 1997 to 2012, the number of corporations publicly traded on US stock exchanges dropped 45%. According to one observer (Gerald F. Davis), "public corporations have become less concentrated, less integrated, less interconnected at the top, shorter lived, less remunerative for average investors, and less prevalent since the turn of the 21st century".

== Privatization ==
In corporate privatization, more often called "going private," a group of private investors or another company that is privately held can buy out the shareholders of a public company, taking the company off the public markets. That is typically done through a leveraged buyout and occurs when the buyers believe the securities have been undervalued by investors. In some cases, public companies that are in severe financial distress may also approach a private company or companies to take over ownership and management of the company. One way of doing so would be to make a rights issue designed to enable the new investor to acquire a supermajority. With a supermajority, the company could then be relisted, or privatized.

Alternatively, a publicly traded company may be purchased by one or more other publicly traded companies, with the target company becoming either a subsidiary or joint venture of the purchaser(s), or ceasing to exist as a separate entity, its former shareholders receiving compensation in the form of either cash, shares in the purchasing company or a combination of both. When the compensation is primarily shares then the deal is often considered a merger. Subsidiaries and joint ventures can also be created de novo, which often happens in the financial sector. Subsidiaries and joint ventures of publicly traded companies are not generally considered to be privately held companies (even though they themselves are not publicly traded) and are generally subject to the same reporting requirements as publicly traded companies. Finally, shares in subsidiaries and joint ventures can be (re)-offered to the public at any time. Firms that are sold in this manner are called spin-offs.

Most industrialized jurisdictions have enacted laws and regulations that detail the steps that prospective owners (public or private) must undertake if they wish to take over a publicly traded corporation. That often entails the would-be buyer(s) making a formal offer for each share of the company to shareholders.

== Trading and valuation ==
The shares of a publicly traded company are often traded on a stock exchange. The value or "size" of a company is called its market capitalization, a term that is often shortened to "market cap." This is calculated as the number of shares outstanding (as opposed to authorized but not necessarily issued) times the price per share.

For example, a company with two million shares outstanding and a price per share of US$40 has a market capitalization of US$80 million. However, a company's market capitalization should not be confused with the fair market value of the company as a whole since the price per share is influenced by a host of other factors, including prevailing market conditions, liquidity, investor sentiment, differing valuation methods, and more. Market capitalization reflects only the value of a company's equity. Measures such as enterprise value also incorporate debt and cash, providing a broader assessment of a company's overall valuation.

With the exception of over-the-counter (OTC) stocks—sometimes known as "penny stocks"—many publicly traded stocks in the US enjoy robust liquidity thanks to market makers, low-latency information transmission, and the proliferation of the digitization of trading platforms.

== See also ==
- Forbes Global 2000
- Government agency
- Non-departmental public body
- plc, public company under UK legislation
- Stock exchange cooperative
- Statutory corporation
- Publicly unlisted company
- Regulatory agency
- Statutory authority
- Statutory corporation
- Success trap
- United Kingdom company law
