= Stock exchange cooperative =

Publicly traded cooperative

A stock exchange cooperative or stock exchange co-operative is a business organization owned by its members, where individuals or organizations can publicly buy and sell the cooperative’s shares, akin to the way shares of public companies are traded. It is a business entity that is available in Finland. Starting the stock exchange cooperatives has been possible since 2013 the Co-operatives Act. In Finnish, the stock exchange cooperative is named pörssiosuuskunta and in Finlandssvenska it is called börsandelslag. Stock exchange cooperatives have some structural governing differences regarding standard co-operatives in Finland. For instance, the use of representatives (a person authorized by the client) in the cooperative assembly cannot be limited which can be done in the standard Finnish cooperatives.
