= Jobs with Justice =

American labor rights organization

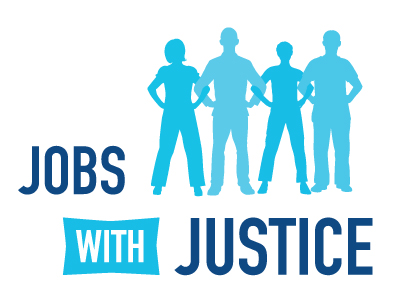
The current Jobs With Justice logo, in use since 2014

Jobs With Justice (JWJ) is a not-for-profit workers' rights organization in the United States, focused on economic justice efforts. They partner with a variety of community, faith, student, and other labor groups. The organizations was founded in 1987 and is made up of individuals and affiliated organizations. As of 2022, Jobs With Justice coalitions existed in over 30 cities or states in all regions of the country. Jobs With Justice is based in Washington, D.C., and is led by Executive Director Erica Smiley.

== History ==
=== Founding ===
Jobs With Justice was founded in 1987 following efforts by the Communications Workers of America to organize call center workers in Detroit, Michigan. Then CWA president Larry Cohen helped organize what became Jobs With Justice.

Jobs With Justice's first rally was held in Miami, Florida at the Miami Convention Center. Among the notable attendees included Rev. Jesse Jackson, who spoke at the rally."

=== Merger with American Rights at Work ===
In 2012, Jobs With Justice merged with fellow labor rights group American Rights at Work forming a single organization under the Jobs With Justice banner.

== Projects ==
=== STRIKE!: The Game of Worker Rebellion ===
TESA Collective and Jobs With Justice funded a labor organizing game on Kickstarter. In STRIKE!: The Game of Worker Rebellion, players grow their ranks, mobilize workers, and organize strikes around their city. The campaign for the game ran during a union drive at Kickstarter.

== See also ==
- Social Movement Unionism
- Community Unionism
- Union Organizer
- United States Student Association
- Philadelphia Jobs with Justice
