= Stanford Federal Credit Union =

Credit union in California, USA

- Company type: Credit union
- Industry: Financial services
- Founded: 1959
- Headquarters: Palo Alto, California, United States
- Number of locations: 6 branches
- Area served: Stanford community, employees, volunteers, and member companies of the Palo Alto Chamber of Commerce, members of the Friends of Palo Alto Libraries (FOPAL), members of the Museum of American Heritage (MOAH), and companies located on Stanford land.
- Key people: Joan Opp, President/CEO Board of Directors; Dr. Shirley J. Everett, Chair; Gregory L. Rosston, Vice Chair; Tana S. Hutchison, Treasurer; Dan Kolkowitz, Secretary; Jonathan Dreyfus; Joan Opp; Curtis Feeny; Robert Reidy; Neil Hamilton; Agustin (Gus) Araya, Advisory Board Member Supervisory Committee; Michael Tran Duff, Chair; Desmond Low-Kum, Secretary; Neil Hamilton; David MacKenzie Jessica Kennedy
- Products: Deposit accounts; consumer loans; mortgages; credit cards; investments; business banking; online banking; mobile banking
- Total assets: US$3.6 billion (2020)
- Website: sfcu.org

Stanford Federal Credit Union (or Stanford FCU) is a federally chartered credit union located in Palo Alto, California. It provides banking services to the Stanford community. Stanford FCU has over $3.6 billion in assets and serves over 80,000 members.

== History ==
Stanford Federal Credit Union was created by a group of Stanford University employees on December 17, 1959. Its original field of membership was limited to employees of the university. The credit union opened in 1960 with $261 in deposits and established its first office in Encina Hall on Stanford University’s campus.

In 1985, Stanford Federal Credit Union expanded its field of membership to include Stanford University students and members and employees of the Palo Alto Chamber of Commerce. In 2004, the credit union opened its membership to members of the Friends of Palo Alto Libraries (FOPAL). Today, Stanford Federal Credit Union also serves numerous company partners, including Google, VMware, Facebook, Tesla, SAP, and more.

=== Expansion of Services ===
The credit union became one of the first to offer checking accounts and credit cards in the late 1970s. In the early 1980s, it introduced ATMs and banking by telephone.

In November 1993, Stanford Federal Credit Union conducted its first four internet transactions; and in 1994, it became the first financial institution to offer online banking when it launched its website; it offered online BillPay to its members in 1997, added account aggregation and mobile banking in 2002, and became one of the first institutions to implement the Passmark authentication system in 2005. In 2007, Stanford FCU joined the CO-OP network to provide its members with over 30,000 surcharge-free ATMs nationwide.

== Membership ==
Any member of the Stanford community may join Stanford Federal Credit Union, including students and employees of Stanford University, employees of Stanford Health Care, Stanford Children’s Health, and SLAC National Accelerator Laboratory.

The credit union’s field of membership also extends to the following:

- Companies that are located on Stanford-owned lands
- Members, employees, and volunteers of the Palo Alto Chamber of Commerce
- Employees of member companies of the Palo Alto Chamber of Commerce
- Employees of select member companies, including Google, VMware, Facebook, Tesla and SAP
- Members, employees, and volunteers of the Friends of Palo Alto Libraries (FOPAL)
- Members, employees, and volunteers of the Museum of American Heritage (MOAH)

== Organization ==
Stanford Federal Credit Union is chartered by the National Credit Union Administration (NCUA) as a federally insured credit union. It is led by a Board of Directors that is elected by the credit union’s members and serves without pay.

== Products and services ==
Stanford Federal Credit Union offers a range of financial services, including consumer and business accounts and loans.

Financial tools and services in the form of webinars, online calculators, and financial counseling are also available to both consumer and business members of the credit union.

The credit union has six branch locations and maintains over 30 ATMs around the Stanford University campus and Palo Alto, California. As a member of the CO-OP Network since 2007, Stanford Federal Credit Union also has access to over 30,000 additional surcharge-free ATMs.

== Subsidiary ==
In 1997, Stanford Federal Credit Union announced the creation of its wholly owned subsidiary, Cardinal Services Corporation (CSC). The corporation focused on licensing software and supporting Internet development for businesses. Cardinal Services Corporation operated as a credit union service organization (CUSO). CUSOs were established by the NCUA as a way for credit unions to conduct business that they would otherwise be restricted from.

A spin-off of Cardinal Services Corporation, Cyberbranch, was announced in April 2000 by Stanford Federal Credit Union, and replaced the CUSO. CyberBranch specialized in internet and intranet technologies designed for the financial services industry.

In June 2001, Canadian information technology management and business process services company, CGI Group Inc. acquired Cyberbranch for US$1 million.

== Community involvement ==
In 2004, Stanford Federal Credit Union funded an endowed professorship within Stanford University’s School of Humanities and Sciences.
