= Hip Hop Congress =

Non profit, international grassroots organization

- Founded: 1993
- Type: 501(c)(3)
- Purpose: Hip Hop Congress is a network of individuals and organizations that are driving the necessary transformation of the world by uplifting culture for the creative development of artists and young people through education, civic engagement, and equitable resource exchange.
- Location: Redwood City, California
- Origins: Oxnard, California
- Region served: Worldwide
- Website: www.hiphopcongress.com

The Hip Hop Congress (HHC) is a non profit, international grassroots organization. The organization's goal is to educate, demonstrate, commicate, and inspire hip-hop culture. This includes events and workshops focused on the Hip Hop arts of DJing and turntablism, MCing/rapping, breakdancing, graffiti art and beatboxing. Between 2004 and 2008, it was part of an umbrella organizing group of hip hop groups called the Generational Alliance. Its headquarters is located in Redwood City, California. The Hip Hop Congress currently works with about 25 chapters on university campuses, high schools, and communities around the world.

== History ==
The Hip Hop Congress began as a loose confederation of hip hop arts groups, particularly on college campuses. Its initial founders were Shamako Noble and Real Robinson IV, who established northern and southern chapters in 1997.

In 2000, Jordan Bromley and Ron Gubitz founded another campus activist group using the same name. The two organizations later discovered each other online in 2000 and decided to merge into a single organization rather than compete over the name. After the founders graduated from college around 2003, efforts began to formalize the Congress as a national organization. The first Hip Hop Conference was held in 2006, at which time the organization had more than 20 chapters.
