= Student Labor Action Coalition =

The Student Labor Action Coalition (SLAC) is a network of campus organizations that support worker struggles and their unions.

Since its founding in 1994, SLAC organizations typically have worked to educate the campus community on unions and worker struggles, organized students and broader campus communities to participate in labor solidarity activities in the U.S. and worldwide, built coalitions with local unions and social justice organizations, and trained students to work within the labor movement.

== History ==
The first Student Labor Action Coalition was established in 1994 at the University of Wisconsin-Madison to support the 700 locked out workers at the A.E. Staley Company in Decatur, Illinois. In February 1994, a group of undergraduates saw the video "Deadly Corn" in their UW-Madison sociology course, and angered by what they learned of the Staley workers' struggle for safe working conditions, they organized the Staley Solidarity Action Coalition. After a semester organizing a study group on the issue and taking a trip to Decatur, they changed their name to the Student Labor Action Coalition (SLAC) with the aim to help worker struggles wherever they occur.

In their first year, the UW-Madison SLAC educated the campus community on the Staley lockout, participated in the Miller and Pepsi boycotts of A.E. Staley, traveled to Decatur, Illinois to attend labor solidarity rallies and helped spread similar support activities to other university campuses.

In October 1994, SLAC activists met University of Michigan students at a solidarity rally in Decatur. Soon, Michigan students formed a SLAC on their campus, and in the spring of 1995 hosted a young activist conference which was attended by students from eight different campuses. Within a year, SLAC organizations spread to other campuses in the Midwest and Northeast.

In the 1990s, two developments helped spread the formation of SLAC nationwide. First, the AFL–CIO, under the direction of AFL–CIO president John Sweeney, initiated the AFL–CIO Organizing Institute, which sought to enlist college activists as labor organizers. The AFL–CIO supported SLAC activities as part of this initiative. Secondly, beginning in 1998, SLAC organizations got a boost from the outpouring of anti-sweatshop activism on college campuses, which focused on solidarity efforts with workers in the Third World.

By 1999, there were dozens of SLAC student organizations on campuses nationwide, working on a wide variety of worker solidarity campaigns. Many campus SLACs affiliated with the national organization, United Students Against Sweatshops , after its founding in 2000.
