= Shamako Noble =

American rapper

- Origin: California, United States
- Genres: Hip hop
- Occupations: Rapper, political theorist

Shamako Noble is a hip hop artist, cultural organizer, and political theorist from San Jose, California. He was one of the co-founders of the Hip Hop Congress. He was a candidate for U.S. Senate for California in 2016, though he did not actually file to be on the ballot. He was interviewed by several news stations while he was participating in organizing Romneyville, a protest encampment outside the 2012 Republican National Convention.

== Career ==
Shamako has held several positions in the U.S. Green Party. In 2012 he was the personal assistant of the Green Party VP candidate Cheri Honkala, as well as the executive director the Hip Hop Congress. In 2014 he was the Secretary of Culture in the Green Shadow Cabinet.
