= Philadelphia Jobs with Justice =

Philadelphia Jobs with Justice is a coalition of labor unions, student organizations, community groups, and faith congregations serving the Philadelphia area. Founded in 1999, Philadelphia Jobs with Justice is an autonomous affiliate of the national Jobs with Justice network. Its stated mission is to fight for the rights of working people in Philadelphia and the surrounding area.

== History ==
In 2000, Philadelphia JwJ launched its first major campaign to ensure fair treatment and good contracts for public workers unionized with the American Federation of State, County, and Municipal Employees (AFSCME). Tactics included sending postcards to officials and leaders, sending out statements in the form of brochures and press releases, and holding rallies. The campaign succeeded in showing solidarity with the AFSCME members, educating Philadelphians on the importance of the issue, and limiting Mayor John Street's anti-union activity.

Philadelphia JwJ worked closely with security guards at the University of Pennsylvania, Temple University, and the Philadelphia Museum of Art to gain independent union recognition. The guards at the museum, who are contracted with AlliedBarton, voted to form the Philadelphia Security Officers Union (PSOU).

== 2010 ==
In September, 2010, JwJ organized a jobs rally in center city outside the Greater Philadelphia Chamber of Commerce. The goal was to send the message that the mayor and city council should be making large corporations pay higher taxes. JwJ, and other groups present—such as AFSCME DC 47—said that tax policies benefitting large corporations were hurting the middle class and the job market. Speakers at the rally also asked that large non-profits, such as hospitals and universities, who receive services from the city, should pay taxes as well.

In November, JwJ organizers led a protest with union members from the International Longshoremen's Association, the Philadelphia Electricians' Union. The activists nonviolently occupied a convenience store in Center City to protest Fresh Del Monte Produce's corporate policy. Prior to the protest, Del Monte had made a decision to unload fruit in New Jersey, rather than the Philadelphia port, depriving Philadelphia workers of many hours of work and pay, sometimes as much as 75%. Protestors refused to recognize the new union that Del Monte was working with. Philadelphia unions declared a boycott of Del Monte until they reversed their decision.

== 2011 ==
In March, 2011, JwJ activists disrupted the Paradigm Award Ceremony granting Sunoco CEO Lynn Elsenhans an award for being a strong female business leader. The disrupters said that they "saw no female leader present", as Elsenhans was responsible for laying off hundreds of workers and slashing health care benefits for the employees in dangerous refineries.

Philadelphia Jobs with Justice is a member of the Coalition for Healthy Families, a coalition of 100 organizations trying to get legislation passed ensuring paid sick days for all Philadelphia workers. The campaign has been active since late February, when a City Council committee was considering bringing a bill before Council. On March 1, protesters carrying signs gathered around City Hall and within Council chambers demanding the Earned Sick Time bill. On that date, the bill, entitled "Promoting Healthy Families and Workplaces" (Bill Number 08074) universally passed out of committee, meaning that the next step was to have council as a whole vote on the bill. Beginning later in March, public commenters began speaking at council proceedings weighing in on both sides of the issue. Activists also started holding rallies; on May 9, working mothers and daughters shared statements outside the Childspace Day Care Center describing how difficult it is to care for a child and hold down a job without paid sick days. Later that same month, activists surrounded city hall with 10,000 orange postcards that supporters of the bill from every city district had filled out with messages explaining the bill's necessity. On June 9, Council delayed a vote on the bill for another week, but voted on an amendment to the bill exempting businesses with fewer than 5 employees. Workers protested outside beforehand, and packed chambers during the proceedings, holding up signs whenever the bill was up for discussion and giving public comment. Opponents of the bill spoke as well. The bill, which would affect 210,000 Philadelphia workers, has 70% support in the city; 64% of Republicans and 72% of Democrats support it, and many of them say that they would rather vote for City Council candidates who support it as well. On June 16, City Council passed the bill by a vote of 9–8, but was vetoed by Mayor Michael Nutter.
