= List of retailers' cooperatives =

The following businesses are or were retailers' cooperatives, which are owned by retail businesses, and provide centralised marketing and buying services.

== Grocery stores ==
- ADM Londis – partially demutualized in 2004
- Affiliated Foods Midwest
- Affiliated Foods Southwest
- Associated Food Stores
- Associated Grocers - acquired by Unified Western Grocers
- Associated Grocers of Florida
- Associated Grocers of Maine
- Associated Grocers of New England
- Associated Grocers of the South
- Associated Supermarkets
- Associated Wholesale Grocers
- Associated Wholesalers
- Central Grocers Cooperative
- Certified Grocers Midwest
- Co-operative Group (also a consumers' cooperative in its own right)
- Coop Norden
- Conad
- E. Leclerc
- Foodstuffs
- The Fresh Grocer (Wakefern Food Corporation)
- IGA
- Nisa
- Olean Wholesale Grocery
- PriceRite (Wakefern Food Corporation)
- ShopRite (Wakefern Food Corporation)
- Shurfine
- Système U
- Topco
- U.R.M. Stores
- Unified Western Grocers Subsidiary of SuperValu
- Western Family Foods acquired by Topco

== Pharmacies ==
- Family Pharmacy
- Good Neighbor Pharmacy
- Health Mart
- IDL Drug Stores (defunct)
- Leader Drug Stores
- Rexall (no longer a retailer)
- Valu-Rite

== Hardware stores ==
- Ace Hardware
- Distribution America (Trustworthy Hardware, Sentry Hardware, Golden Rule Lumber Center, Priced Right Everyday)
- Do It Best
- Handy Hardware
- Home Hardware Stores (Canada)
- Mica DIY
- Mitre 10 (New Zealand)
- PRO Hardware
- True Value - Subsidiary of Do It Best
- United Hardware Distributing Company (Hardware Hank)
- Val-Test Distributors

== Distributors ==
- National Automotive Parts Association
- Val-Test Distributors
- Orgill
- Jensen Distribution Services

== Other ==
- Best Western – hotel marketing
- The Bike Cooperative – began in 2003 as a subsidiary of the Carpet One parent cooperative (CCA Global Partners); in 2009, it became a bona fide cooperative of independent US bike store owners
- Florists' Transworld Delivery (FTD) and Interflora (US and UK/Ireland affiliates demutualized in 1995 and 2006, respectively)
- Intres b.v.
- KaleidoScoops
- Lighting One
- Mr. Tire (Universal Cooperatives)
- Les Mousquetaires

== See also ==
- Retailer Owned Food Distributors & Associates – federation of grocers' cooperatives
- Consumers' cooperative
- List of cooperatives
- SPAR – an international grocers' and distributors' marketing and buying association that organizes along similar lines to a co-operative
