= Affiliated Foods Southwest =

- Type: Co-op
- Industry: Retailing
- Predecessor: Model Markets
- Founded: 1948
- Founder: C.E. Toland
- Defunct: 2009
- Fate: Acquired
- Successor: Associated Wholesale Grocers
- Headquarters: Little Rock, Arkansas, United States
- Area served: Southern United States
- Key people: John Mills
- Products: Groceries
- Number of employees: 530
- Website: afslr.com

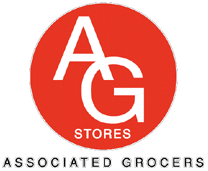
Old logo

Affiliated Foods Southwest was a retailers' cooperative serving independent supermarkets in Arkansas, Louisiana, Mississippi, Oklahoma, Tennessee, and Texas. It was founded in 1948 by C. E. "Doc" Toland, who had worked in a cooperative in Little Rock, Arkansas called Model Markets. It was a member of Retailer Owned Food Distributors & Associates and distributed Shurfine products in its stores.

Affiliated Foods Southwest also operated several Harvest Foods grocery stores in Arkansas.

The company declared bankruptcy on May 5, 2009. It was acquired by Associated Wholesale Grocers.
