= Olean Wholesale Grocery =

Olean Wholesale Grocery was a retailers' cooperative serving independent supermarkets in New York, Pennsylvania, and Ohio. It was founded in 1922 and is a member of Retailer Owned Food Distributors & Associates. It distributed Shurfine, ShurSaving, TopCare, ValuTime and Western Family products in its stores, along with national brands.

It was headquartered in the town of Olean, New York, just east of the city of the same name.

In August 2015, Olean Wholesale Grocery filed a lawsuit against Chicken of the Sea and Bumble Bee Foods accusing the companies of violating the Sherman Antitrust Act and artificially propping up the cost of canned tuna. The resulting pressure effectively killed a proposed merger between the two companies.

In late 2018, C&S Wholesale Grocers announced its intent to purchase Olean Wholesale Grocery, with the purchase slated to close in early 2019. C&S then announced plans to shut down the OWG facility in late 2019.
