= Associated Grocers of Maine =

Retailers' cooperative

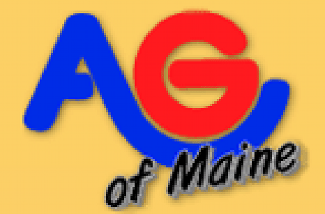

Associated Grocers of Maine was a retailers' cooperative serving independent supermarkets in Maine, New Hampshire, Vermont, and Massachusetts, USA. It was founded in 1953 and was a member of Retailer Owned Food Distributors & Associates. It distributed Shurfine products in its stores. It went into receivership on April 26, 2011.
