= Frank Hibbard Estate House =

Historic house in Illinois, United States

- Hibbard, Frank, Estate House–Deerpath Hill Estates
- U.S. National Register of Historic Places
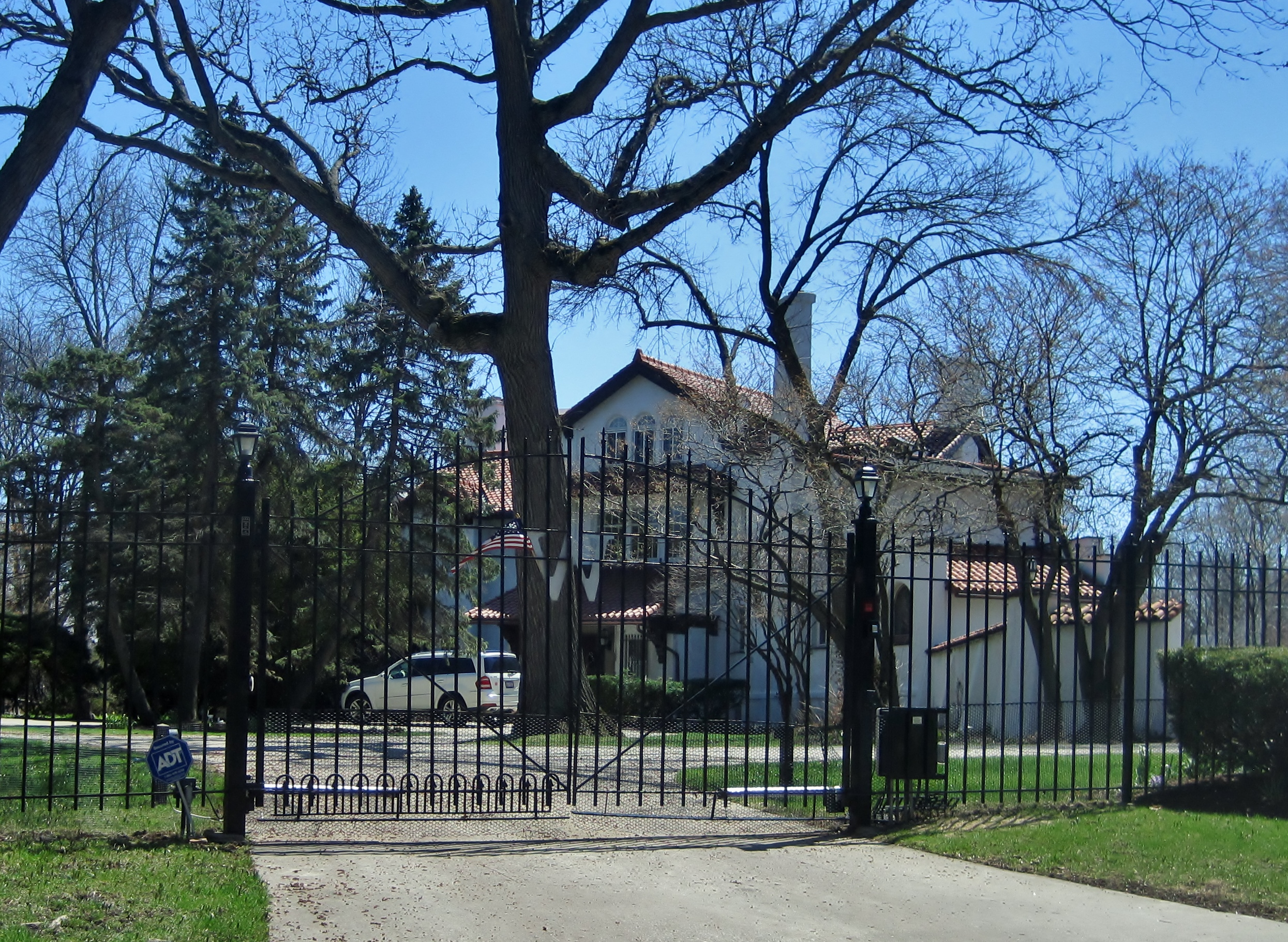
- Frank Hibbard Estate House-Deerpath Hill Estates, Lake Forest, IL

- Location within Illinois Location within the United States
- Location: Lake Forest, Illinois
- Coordinates: 42°14′51″N 87°51′52″W
- Built: 1929
- Architect: Harvey, George Lyon; Anderson, Stanley D., et al.
- Architectural style: Mission/Spanish Revival
- MPS: Deerpath Hill Estates:an English Garden Development in Lake Forest, Illinois MPS
- NRHP reference No.: 06000379
- Added to NRHP: May 12, 2006

The Frank Hibbard Estate House is a historic house located at 301 North Chiltern Drive in the Deerpath Hill Estates development in Lake Forest, Illinois. The house was built in 1903 for Frank Hibbard of Hibbard, Spencer, Bartlett & Company, which later became True Value Hardware. Architect George Lyon Harvey designed the house in the Mediterranean Revival style; his design featured a terra cotta roof, decorative iron window coverings, and several porches. In 1929, developer Henry Turnbull purchased the property. Turnbull divided the property, which originally occupied a 21-acre (8.5 ha) plot, to create the Second Addition to Deerpath Hill Estates. Architect Stanley Anderson, a colleague of Turnbull and the developer of the original Deerpath Hill Estates, modernized the house in keeping with its Mediterranean design.

The house was added to the National Register of Historic Places on May 12, 2006.
