= United Hardware Distributing Company =

United Hardware / Hardware Hank
- Company type: Cooperative
- Industry: Retail (Hardware)
- Founded: May 15, 1945; 81 years ago in Plymouth, Minnesota
- Founder: Eugene James Koblas, Sr.
- Headquarters: Maple Grove, Minnesota, U.S.
- Products: handtools, powertools, electrical, hardware, plumbing, lawn and garden
- Website: www.hardwarehank.com

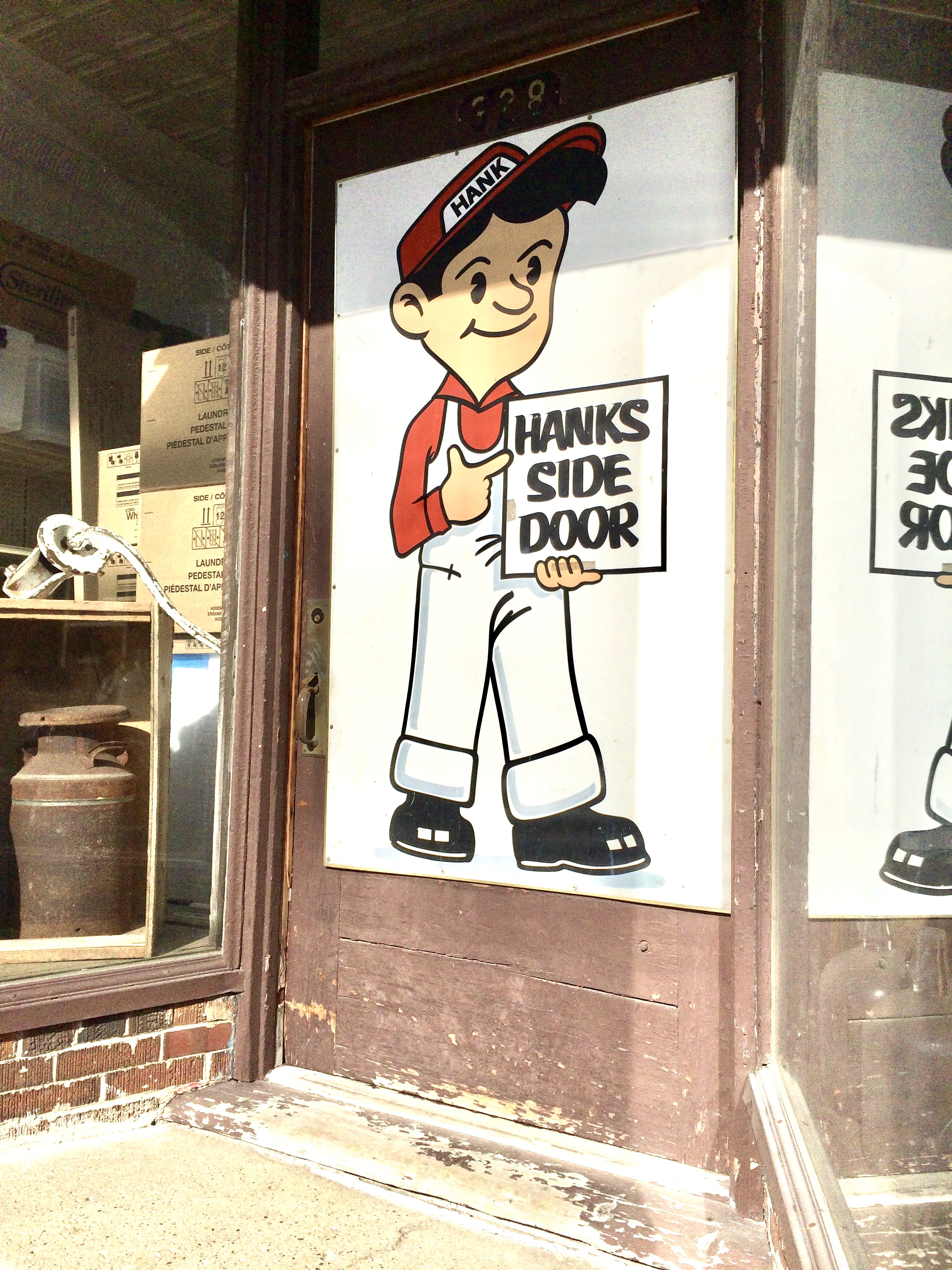
Sign of Hardware Hank holding sign saying "Hanks Side Door" taken at Hardware Hank in Gaylord, Minnesota, 2014

United Hardware Distributing Co. is a dealer-owned corporation based in Maple Grove, Minnesota which provides distribution services for about 610 member-owned stores, the majority of which operate under the Hardware Hank trade name. In addition, the company services about 800 other stores owned by non-members. 2006 sales were $183 million. It was founded in 1945 as a furniture and hardware distributor. The furniture division was sold in 1953, and it became a dealer-owned retailers' cooperative in 1957 when majority control was assumed by a group of hardware store owners. In addition to servicing the Hardware Hank stores, United Hardware also services TrustWorthy Hardware Stores, Golden Rule Lumber Centers, and Ranch & Pet Supply stores. In 2024, United Hardware merged with Do It Best.

== Ranch & Pet Supply ==
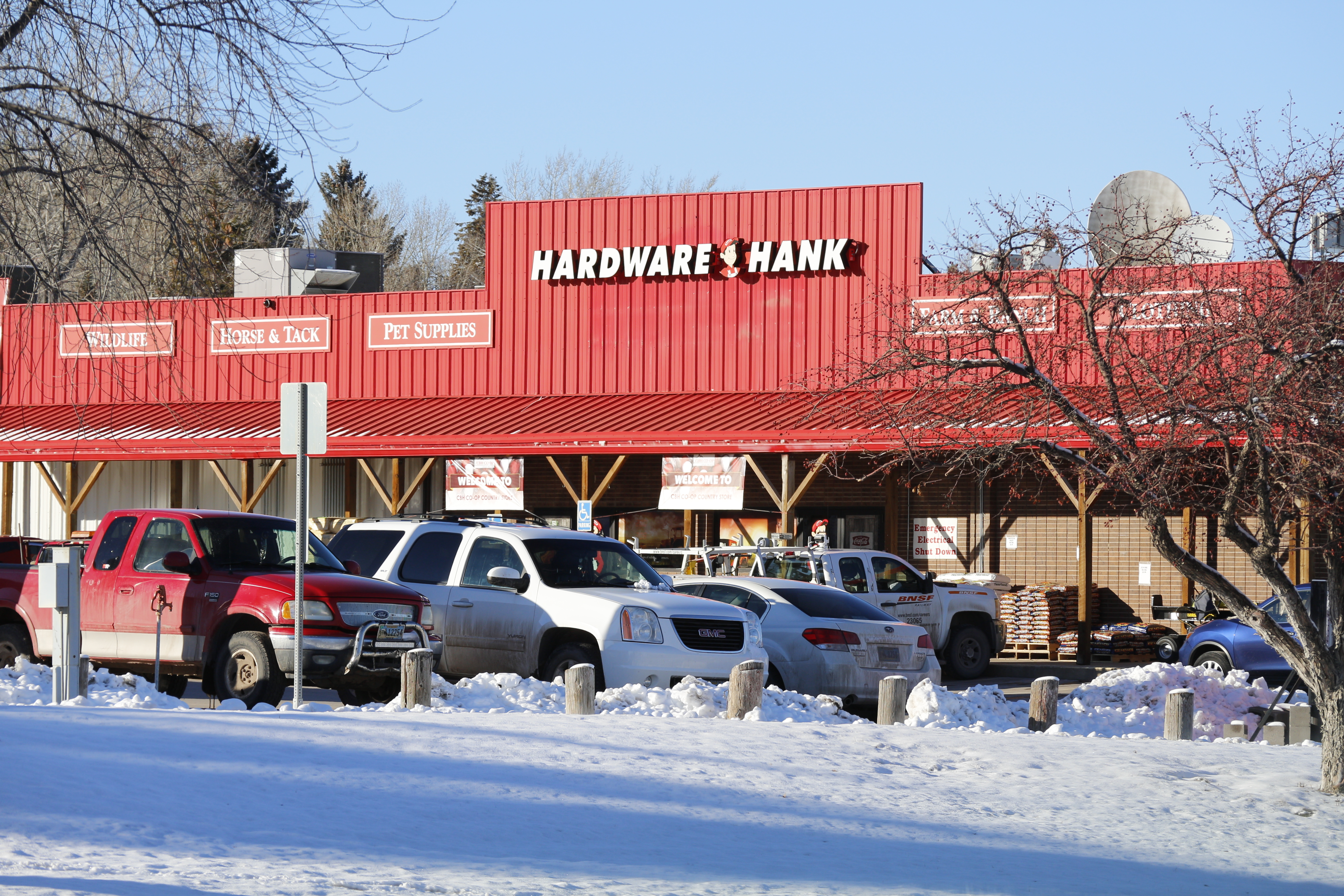
A Hardware Hank store in Gillette, Wyoming

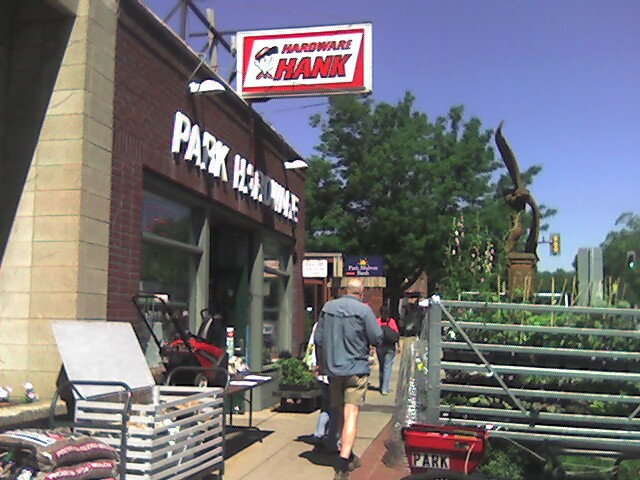
Former Hardware Hank store in St. Anthony Park neighborhood of Saint Paul, Minnesota, c. 2005.

Ranch & Pet Supply is a program offered by United Hardware Distributing Co. that provides products and services to retailers that market their business to hobby farmers and pet owners. The product assortment includes feed and supplies for horses, dogs, cats, wild birds, rabbits, poultry, calves, deer and small animals, as well as fencing, work clothing and boots, and general farm supplies. Ranch & Pet Supply also has a customized advertising program, store planning services, store signage and decor, and other services to help retailers increase sales and profits

== Statistics ==
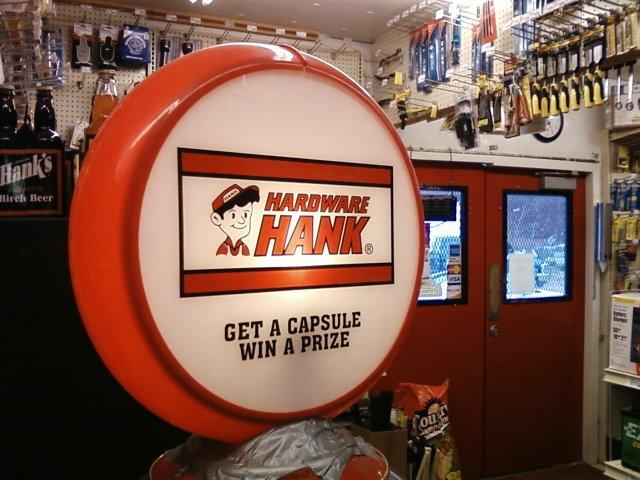
Inside Lame Deer, Montana store.

According to the National Retail Hardware Association, United Hardware is the fifth largest wholesaling and distribution cooperative in the hardware store industry in the United States, behind Ace Hardware, Do it Best, True Value, and Handy Hardware.
