= Certified Grocers Midwest =

American retailers' cooperative

Certified Grocers Midwest was a retailers' cooperative serving independent supermarkets in six states: Illinois, Indiana, Iowa, Michigan, Minnesota, and Wisconsin. It was founded in 1940 and was a member of Retailer Owned Food Distributors & Associates. Many of its stores served the African American and Hispanic communities. It distributed Country's Delight brand bread, milk and ice cream as store brands along with Raggedy Ann and the Certified label. It merged into Central Grocers Cooperative in 2008. Central Grocers Cooperative went bankrupt in May 2017.

It was headquartered in Hodgkins, Illinois, near Chicago.
