= Hardlines Distribution Alliance =

Hardlines Distribution Alliance (HDA) is a hardware store retailers' cooperative formed on April 1, 2022, with the merge of Distribution America and PRO Group.

== History ==
=== Distribution America ===
Distribution America was a hardware store retailers' cooperative with 15000 affiliated retail locations.

Its programs included the well known Sentry Hardware, Trustworthy Hardware, and Golden Rule Lumber Center brands.

=== PRO Group ===
PRO Group, Inc. was a retailers' cooperative and distributors' cooperative. It was based in Denver, Colorado, and was founded in 1953.

The company's retail formats included:

- PRO Hardware
- Farm Mart
- GardenMaster

It formerly had a division: National Paint Distributors, but that was disbanded.

== Members ==
- Blish-Mize
- Emery-Waterhouse
- Florida Hardware
- Handy Hardware
- HDW, Inc
- House-Hasson Hardware
- Jensen Distribution Services
- Monroe Hardware
- United Hardware

== Competitors ==
- Val-Test Distributors
- Reliable Distributors
- Associated Building Materials Distributors
