= HDA =

HDA may refer to:

== Computing ==
- Intel High Definition Audio
- OPC Historical Data Access
- /dev/hda, see Device file § Naming conventions
- Head and Disk Assembly of a Winchester disk

== Science and mathematics ==
- Helicase-dependent amplification
- High density amorphous ice
- Higher-dimensional algebra

== Other uses ==
- Dragonair
- Ein Shemer Airfield
- Hardlines Distribution Alliance, a hardware store retailers' cooperative
- Hockey Diversity Alliance
- The Holy Demon Army
- The Housing Delivery Authority in New South Wales, Australia
- Huntington's Disease Association
- HiTeC Digital Audio, former name of Auzentech
