= Affiliated Foods Midwest =

U.S. retailers' cooperative

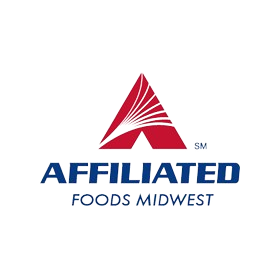
- Company type: Retailers' cooperative
- Industry: Retailing
- Founded: Plainview, Nebraska, U.S. (1931)
- Headquarters: Norfolk, Nebraska, U.S.
- Number of locations: 3 distribution centers (2010)
- Area served: Central United States
- Key people: Martin W. Arter, President
- Products: Groceries
- Number of employees: 800
- Website: http://www.afmidwest.com/

Affiliated Foods Midwest was a retailers' cooperative based in Norfolk, Nebraska, Elwood, Kansas, and Kenosha, Wisconsin, serving the states of Oklahoma, Kansas, Colorado, Wyoming, Nebraska, Missouri, Illinois, Wisconsin, Iowa, South Dakota, North Dakota, Minnesota, Arizona, Arkansas, Kentucky and Michigan. It distributed Shurfine products, and was affiliated with IGA (supermarkets).

It was founded in 1931 in Plainview, Nebraska, it took the name General Wholesale in 1936, and the name Affiliated Foods in 1977. In 2016, it merged with Associated Wholesale Grocers (AWG); the combined entity operates under AWG name.
