= Associated Food Stores =

American retailers' cooperative

- Company type: Retailers' cooperative
- Industry: Wholesale Distributor
- Founded: 1940
- Headquarters: 1850 West 2100 South; Salt Lake City, Utah; United States
- Key people: David Rice; CEO & President
- Brands: Macey's, Associated Fresh Market, Dan's Fresh Market, Dick's Fresh Market, Lin's Fresh Market (Utah)
- Revenue: ▲US$1.6 billion (2007)
- Number of employees: 4,000+
- Website: afstores.com

Associated Food Stores is an American retailers cooperative that supplies nearly 450 independently owned retail supermarkets throughout Utah, Arizona, Idaho, Colorado, Montana, Oregon, Nevada, and Wyoming.

== Description ==
The headquarters for Associated Foods is located at 1850 W 2100 South in Salt Lake City, Utah, United States. The company's president and CEO is David Rice. He replaced Bob Obray following Bob's passing in August 2022. It reported over US$1.6 billion (equivalent to $2.484 billion in 2025) in sales during fiscal year 2007 and is currently the fifty-sixth largest grocery retailer in the country by volume with 23% of its total sales coming from its corporate stores.

== History ==
Associated Food Stores was founded in 1940 by Donald P. Lloyd, president of the Utah Retail Grocers Association along with 34 Utah retailers. Concerned with the effect that large corporate stores would have on small independent retailers, he felt the only way these small businesses could survive is if they united and faced the competition as one, therefore increasing their collective buying power. He convinced 34 stores to donate $300 (equivalent to $6,894 in 2025) to help build an independent and "associated" warehouse.

This initiative was driven by the desire to compete with larger chain stores and discriminatory practices from existing wholesalers.

Facing significant resistance and boycotts from established wholesalers and manufacturers, AFS, under the initial management of Donald Parkinson Lloyd, focused on securing merchandise and building member loyalty. Despite scanty initial inventory, the cooperative grew, demonstrating the power of quantity buying, group advertising, and planned merchandising. By 1941, AFS had forty-one members and achieved sales of $168,160.39 (worth $3,633,991.79 in 2025). The company expanded its reach beyond Utah by the end of 1941.

The post-World War II era saw significant growth in membership and expansion into Idaho and Montana. AFS focused on handling well-known, fast turnover brands. By 1950, membership reached 264, and sales topped $9 million. The company emphasized efficiency and low markups, boasting a net markup of 2.2 percent above wholesale cost by 1950. AFS also faced and successfully navigated a tax standoff with the federal government in the early 1950s.

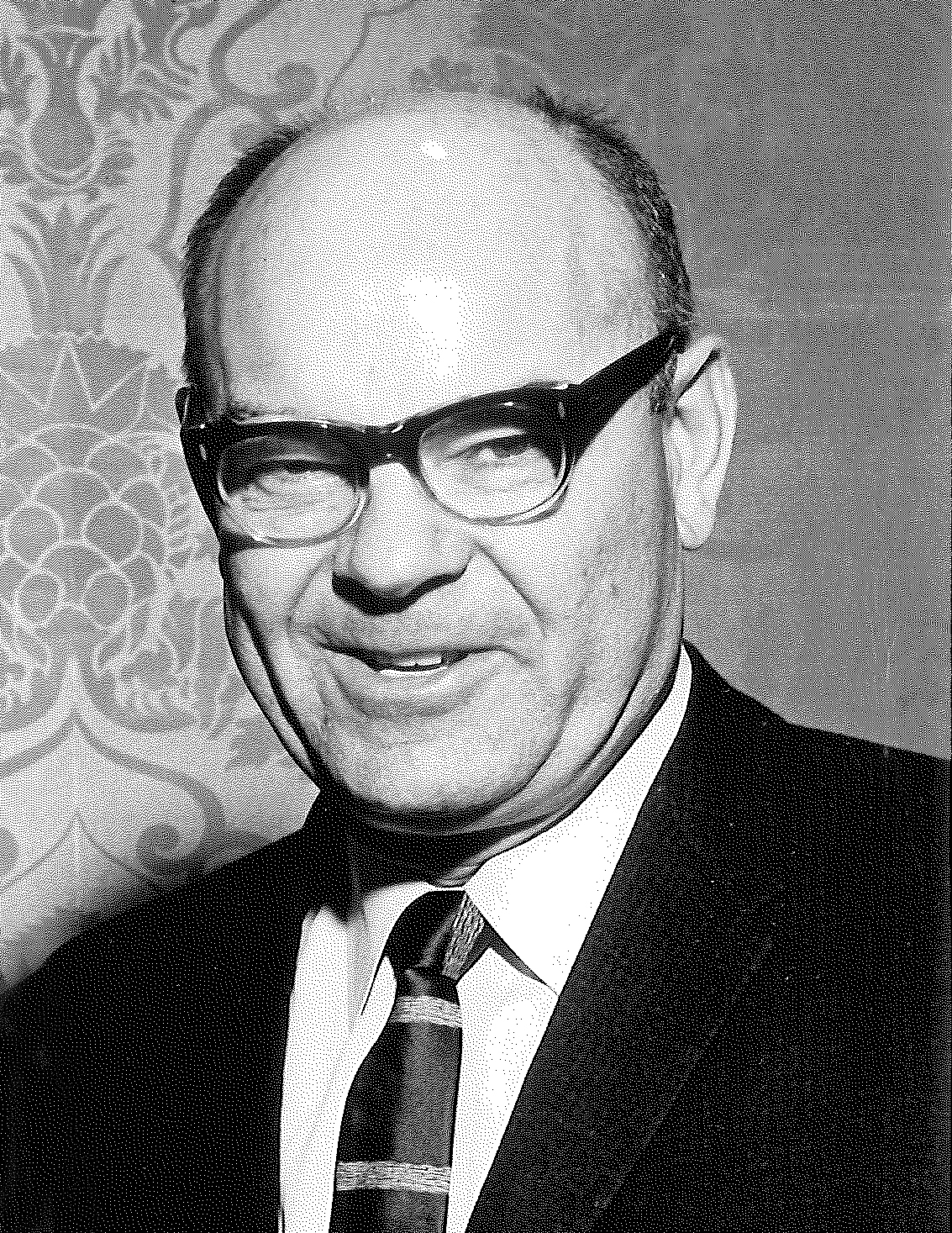

Under the slogan "Think Retail", AFS began building new departments and services to support its members, including produce and frozen foods departments. The company also developed its advertising efforts, moving from handbills to radio and sponsoring community events like symphony concerts and sports clinics. In 1965, AFS celebrated its twenty-fifth anniversary with a sales volume of $85 million, serving 559 members across a large intermountain region. AFS launched its private label program, Western Family, in 1966, to provide members with quality-controlled merchandise.

The company navigated evolving market dynamics, including the growth of larger supermarkets, by implementing cost equalization to fairly serve both large and small members. Gill Warner took over as president in 1972. A venture into California (1966-1976) proved unsuccessful and was eventually withdrawn from. AFS successfully established a new division in Billings, Montana, in 1972. The advertising department continued to evolve, forming groups like Thriftway and Bestway to cater to different store formats.

By 1990, Associated Food Stores had grown significantly, with total assets exceeding $132 million and total sales reaching nearly $680 million. The company remained committed to its core values of cooperation, loyalty, and service to its independent grocer members. The emphasis on a "family feeling" among employees and members remained a key aspect of the company culture.

In 1999, Associated Food Stores purchased Utah grocery store chain Macey's. In August 2017, Macey's broke with 70-year tradition by deciding to open some of their stores on Sundays.

In 2009, Associated Food Stores purchased 34 Albertsons stores in Utah from Supervalu Inc. The stores were renamed Associated Fresh Market (more commonly known as just "Fresh Market"). As of June 2017, however, only 17 of the originally purchased locations were still under the Fresh Market banner, the rest having been either closed or sold.

In 2017, two Fresh Market locations in Murray and Holladay were re-branded as Macey's.

As of 2021, three Macey's locations have closed: the Logan (400 North), Clinton, and the Midvale/Sandy locations.

In 2022, a former Fresh Market in American Fork became a Macey's.

== Corporate stores ==
As well as supplying independent grocers, Associated Food Stores also owns several corporate stores under five different names, operating a total of 41 locations.

- Macey's is their largest brand, and has 23 locations across the Wasatch Front, Tooele, and the Logan area.
  - Locations:
    - American Fork
    - Draper
    - Eagle Mountain
    - Highland
    - Holladay
    - Lehi
    - Millcreek – Mount Olympus
    - Murray
    - Ogden
    - Orem
    - Pleasant Grove
    - Providence
    - Provo
    - Salt Lake City – Parleys Way
    - Salt Lake City - Sugarhouse
    - Sandy - Little Cottonwood
    - Santaquin
    - Spanish Fork
    - Summit Park - Pinebrook
    - Taylorsville
    - Tooele
    - West Jordan
    - West Valley City – Granger
- Fresh Market was created after their acquisition of most of the Albertsons locations in Utah. There are currently 6 locations along the Wasatch Front and in Park City.
  - Locations:
    - Park City
    - Ogden
    - South Ogden
    - Layton
    - Millcreek (39th South)
    - Provo
- Lin's has 7 locations in Hurricane, Cedar City, Richfield, Price, two in St. George, and Overton, Nevada.
- Dan's has 2 locations in Salt Lake County. They are located in Cottonwood Heights and Salt Lake City.
- Dick's has 2 locations in Davis County. They are located in Bountiful and Centerville.

== Other stores ==
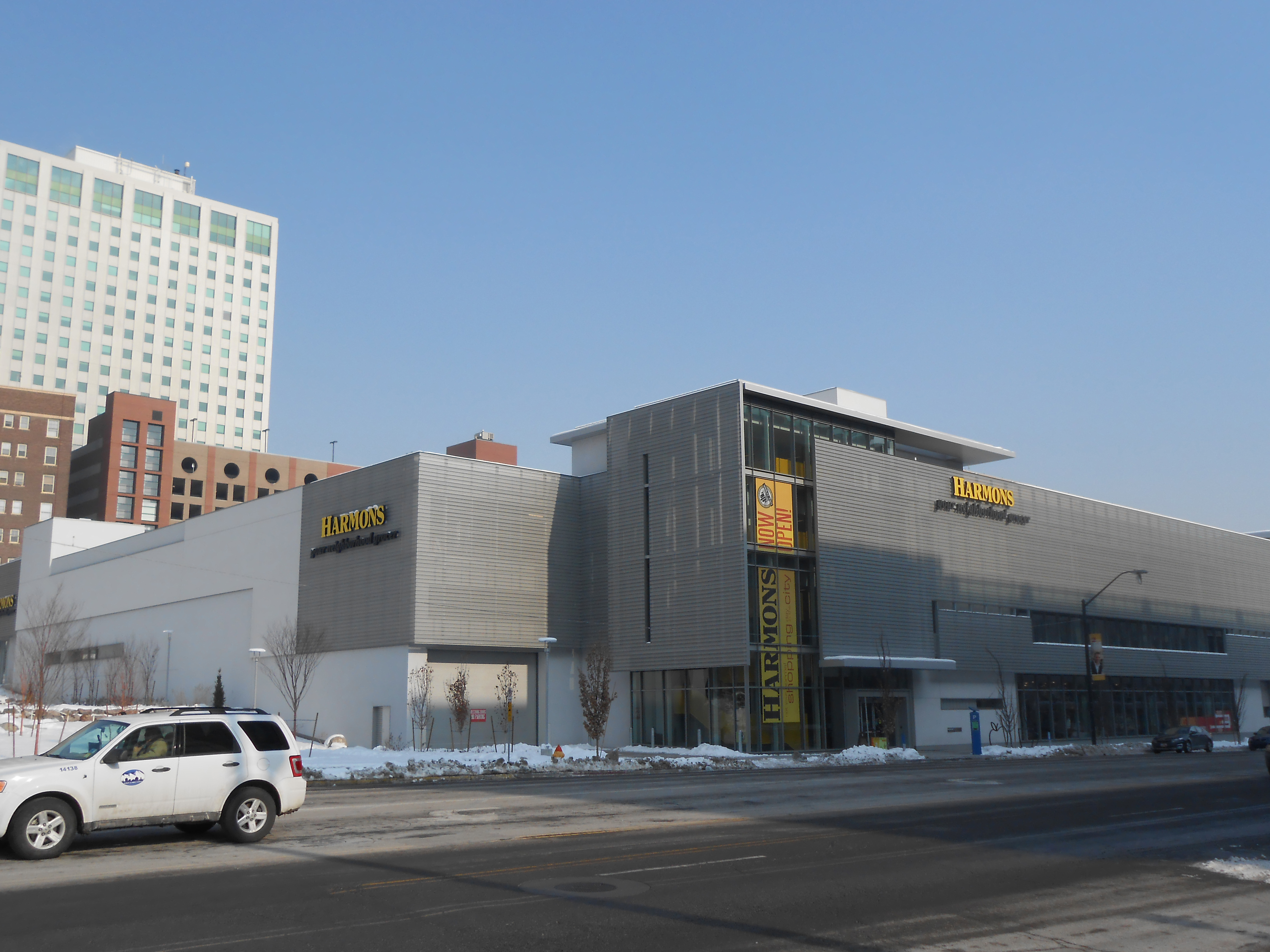
The Harmons store at the City Creek Center in Salt Lake City, Utah

Popular stores owned and/or supplied by Associated Food Stores:

- Broulim's (17 locations, Idaho, & Wyoming)
- Clark's Market (10 locations, Arizona, Colorado, and Utah)
- Finley's Food Farm (1 location, Montana)
- Cloninger's Marketplace (4 locations, Idaho)
- Harmons (20 locations, Utah)
- Kent's Market (4 locations, Utah)
- Lee's Marketplace (9 locations, Utah)
- Peterson's Fresh Market (1 location, Utah)
- Raine's Market (1 location, Nevada)
- Reams (6 locations, Utah)
- Soelberg's Market (2 locations, Utah)
- Ridley's Family Markets (30 locations, Colorado, Idaho, Montana, Nevada, Utah, Wyoming)
- Winegar's Market (2 locations, Utah)
- Stokes Market (6 locations, Montana, Utah, & Idaho)
- Quality Market (1 location, Utah)

== Western Family ==
Associated Food Stores was a primary distributor of the popular store brand Western Family owned by Western Family Foods before being replaced by Food Club and other Topco brands. This also includes Better Buy, Shurfine, Shursavings, and Marketchoice brands.
