= Dahl's Foods =

U.S. grocery store chain

- Company type: Private
- Industry: Retail (grocery)
- Founded: 1931
- Founder: W.T. Dahl
- Defunct: 2015
- Fate: Bankruptcy
- Area served: Des Moines, Iowa, area
- Website: dahlsfoods.com

Dahl's Foods was a grocery store chain headquartered in Des Moines, Iowa that had multiple locations in central Iowa between its founding in 1931 and its demise in 2015.

== History ==
Dahl's Foods was founded by Wolverine Thilbert ("W.T.") Dahl in 1931. The first store was a 1,000-square-foot (93 m^{2}) facility located on Des Moines' east side. The first Dahl's supermarket opened in Des Moines' Beaverdale neighborhood in 1948 and was the first supermarket bakery between the Mississippi River and the Rocky Mountains.

Another store opened in 1952 featuring a scratch bakery, pharmacy, and a lunch counter, uncommon for a grocery store at that time. At the same store, until 1963, customers could drive to the corner of the parking lot to a small brick building known as the "Dahl House" where their groceries, already transported underground, would be available for pick up.

In 1981, the Dahl's store on Ingersoll Avenue was the site of the first grocery purchase using a debit card in the United States. Proving successful, all stores were equipped with ATM POS terminals by 1983.

Dahl's expanded into Kansas in 1979, operating two stores in the Kansas City metropolitan area until leaving that market in 1997. Founder W.T. Dahl stated in an interview with The Des Moines Register that the expansion into Kansas allowed rival Hy-Vee to pick better locations in Dahl's home market of Des Moines.

In 2005, Dahl's stores became ticket outlets for events at the Iowa Events Center.

=== Store closings ===
Amid increased competition from regional chains Hy-Vee and Fareway and national chains Target and Walmart, Dahl's began closing stores in 2014. On May 9, 2014, Dahl's announced that it would close stores in Ames and Ankeny, leaving the chain with 11 stores. On August 31, 2014, Dahl's announced that it will close another store in West Des Moines.

=== Bankruptcy ===
On November 10, 2014, Dahl's announced that it had filed for Chapter 11 bankruptcy. Its food supplier, Kansas City–based Associated Wholesale Grocers, had agreed to buy the company's operating assets. AWG acquired seven of the ten remaining Dahl's stores in a bankruptcy auction on January 30, 2015, for $2.45 million (~$3.16 million in 2024). The acquired locations continued to operate as grocery stores but under a different name. The three locations that AWG did not acquire were sold to different buyers or closed altogether.

=== Final store closings ===
The Dahl's brand disappeared in March 2015 as five of the seven Dahl's stores that AWG acquired were converted to the Price Chopper brand by the end of the month. The remaining two, both in the city of Des Moines, were converted to the Cash Saver brand at the same time.

== Advertising ==
For many years, Dahl's chose not to run weekly advertisements. They opted to use the money that its competitors would spend on advertising toward improving store operations and cutting prices. However, after a new store opened in Clive in May 2003, they began running regular advertisements in newspaper, radio, and television.

Advertising from January 2013 until the company's demise featured an owl named "Chadwick" as its mascot.
