= Intres =

Intres may refer to:

- Intres, Ardèche, town in France
- Intres B.V., Dutch retail organisation
