= House at 965 Castlegate Court =

Historic house in Illinois, United States

- House at 965 Castlegate Court--Deerpath Hill Estates
- U.S. National Register of Historic Places
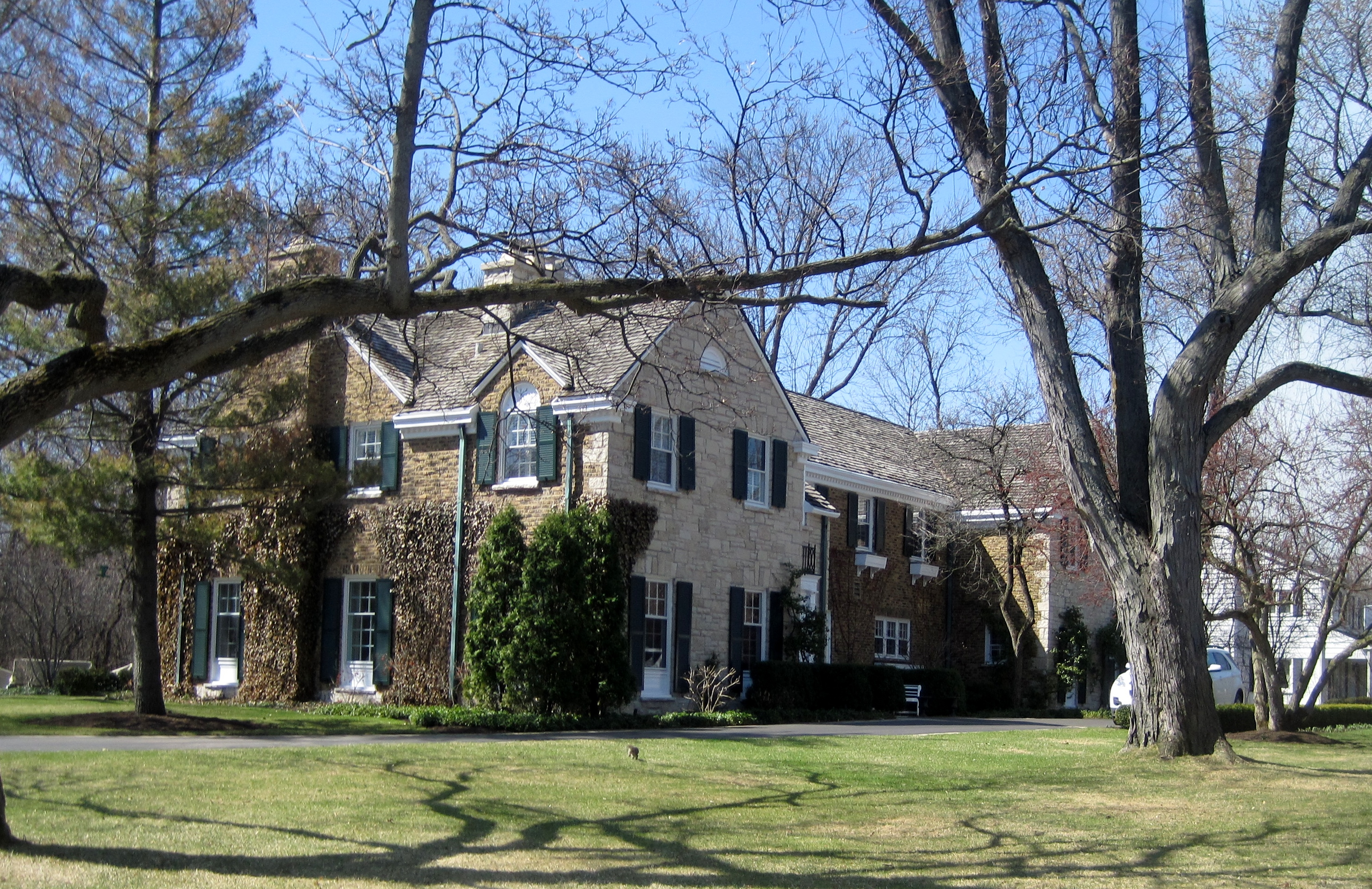

- Location within Illinois Location within the United States
- Location: 965 Castlegate Court, Lake Forest, Illinois
- Coordinates: 42°15′16″N 87°52′14″W
- Area: less than one acre
- Built: 1930
- Architect: Anderson, Stanley D.
- Architectural style: Colonial Revival
- MPS: Deerpath Hill Estates:an English Garden Development in Lake Forest, Illinois MPS
- NRHP reference No.: 06000382
- Added to NRHP: May 12, 2006

The House at 965 Castlegate Court is a historic house located at 965 Castlegate Court in the Deerpath Hill Estates development in Lake Forest, Illinois. Developer Henry K. Turnbull, who planned the original section of Deerpath Hill Estates, built the house in 1930. The house is located at the northern entrance to the First Addition to Deerpath Hill Estates; it is technically outside of the development, and was marketed as being in the "Deerpath Hill Estates district". It is the only house Turnbull built outside of the original three sections of Deerpath Hill Estates; its location served to draw potential buyers into the estate from Waukegan Road. The house has a Colonial Revival design in keeping with the revivalist styles used in the development; its design features two stone-faced gables and a developed cornice.

The house was added to the National Register of Historic Places on May 12, 2006.
