= House at 380 Chiltern Drive =

Historic house in Illinois, United States

- House at 380 Chiltern Drive--Deerpath Hill Estates
- U.S. National Register of Historic Places
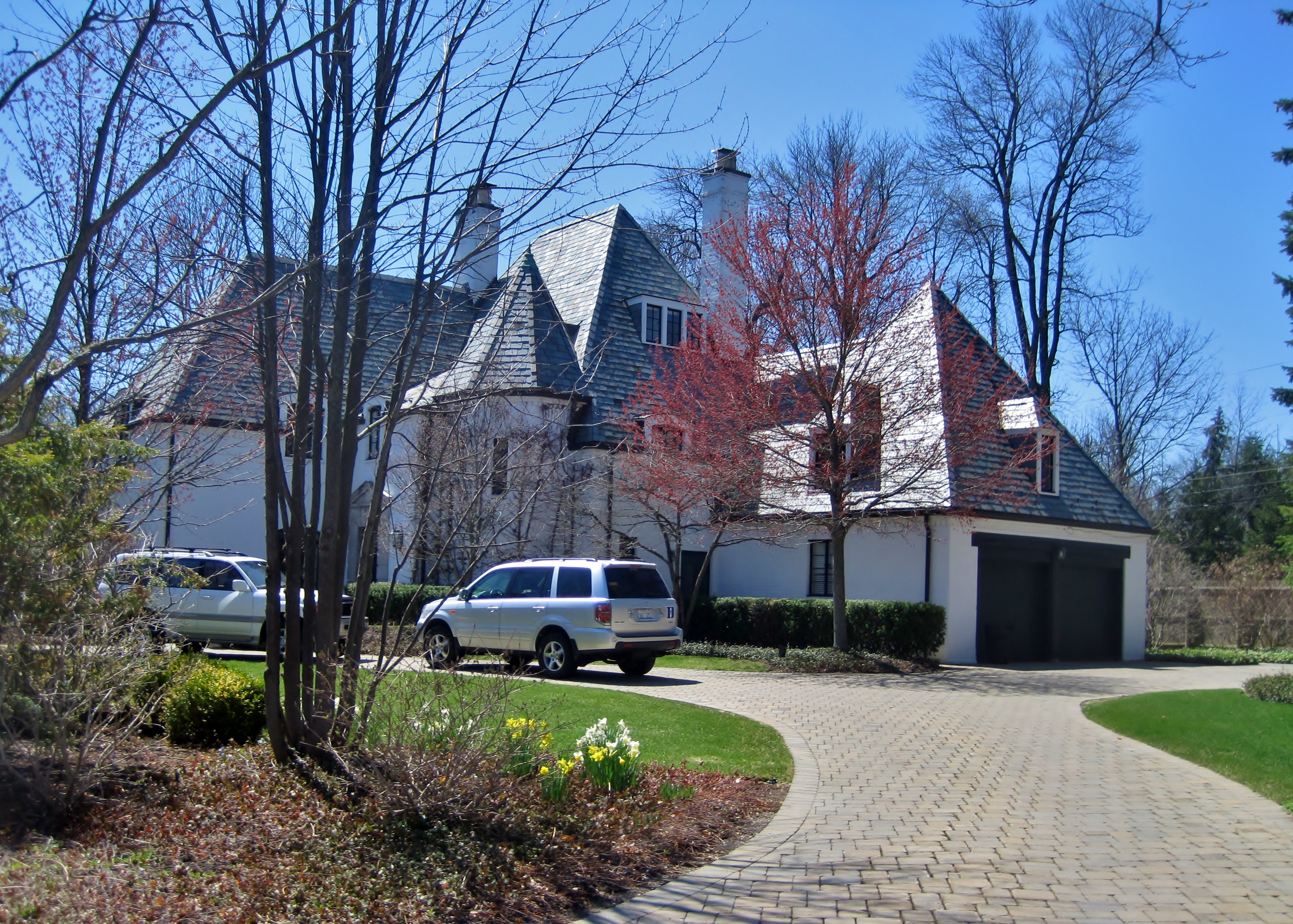

- Location within Illinois Location within the United States
- Location: 380 Chiltern Dr., Lake Forest, Illinois
- Coordinates: 42°14′56″N 87°51′55″W
- Area: less than one acre
- Built: 1930
- Architect: Anderson, Stanley D.; Turnbull, Henry K.,
- Architectural style: French Norman Revival
- MPS: Deerpath Hill Estates:an English Garden Development in Lake Forest, Illinois MPS
- NRHP reference No.: 06000378
- Added to NRHP: May 12, 2006

The House at 380 Chiltern Drive is a historic house located at 380 Chiltern Drive in the Deerpath Hill Estates development in Lake Forest, Illinois. Developer Henry K. Turnbull and architect Stanley D. Anderson, the planners of the original Deerpath Hill Estates development, built and designed the house in 1930 as part of the development's second addition. The house has a French Norman Revival design in keeping with the revivalist styles used throughout the development; its design features a stair tower, steep roofs with flared eaves, and wall dormers with casement windows. The house is the only one built and designed by Turnbull and Anderson in the second addition and was the last house built by the duo before the Great Depression bankrupted Turnbull.

The house was added to the National Register of Historic Places on May 12, 2006.
