= Price Chopper (Midwestern United States) =

Grocery store chain located in midwestern U.S.

- Company type: Family Owned
- Industry: Retail; Grocery
- Founded: Kansas City, Kansas, (1979)
- Headquarters: Kansas City, Kansas
- Number of locations: 55 (2018)
- Products: bakery, dairy, deli, frozen foods, general grocery, meat and seafood, general merchandise.
- Owner: Ball, Cosentino, McKeever and Queen families (Owners of the Kansas City stores); DGS Foods (Owners of the Des Moines stores)
- Number of employees: 10,000
- Website: mypricechopper.com

Price Chopper is a group of four separate family-owned chains of grocery stores formed in 1979 in the Kansas City and Des Moines metropolitan areas that share a common brand name and unified marketing campaigns. The owners are the Ball, Cosentino, McKeever, and Queen families in Kansas City and Crestline Capital, a Bass Family of Texas entity, and DGS Foods in Des Moines. All ownership groups are members of Associated Wholesale Grocers (AWG), which allows Price Chopper to have the buying power of large chains and to share marketing costs. The five ownership groups own and operate 55 stores across Kansas, Missouri, and Iowa. Slogans for the chain include "Just Right" and "Fresher Ways to Save". In 2015 it was the largest grocery store chain in the Kansas City metropolitan area in terms of both sales and number of stores. Its biggest competitor in both Kansas City and Des Moines is Hy-Vee.

On March 28, 2015, Price Chopper moved into the Des Moines, Iowa, area after acquiring five former Dahl's stores.

Price Chopper has no connection to chains of the same name in Canada (which now operates under the name FreshCo), New Zealand, and in New York and New England.

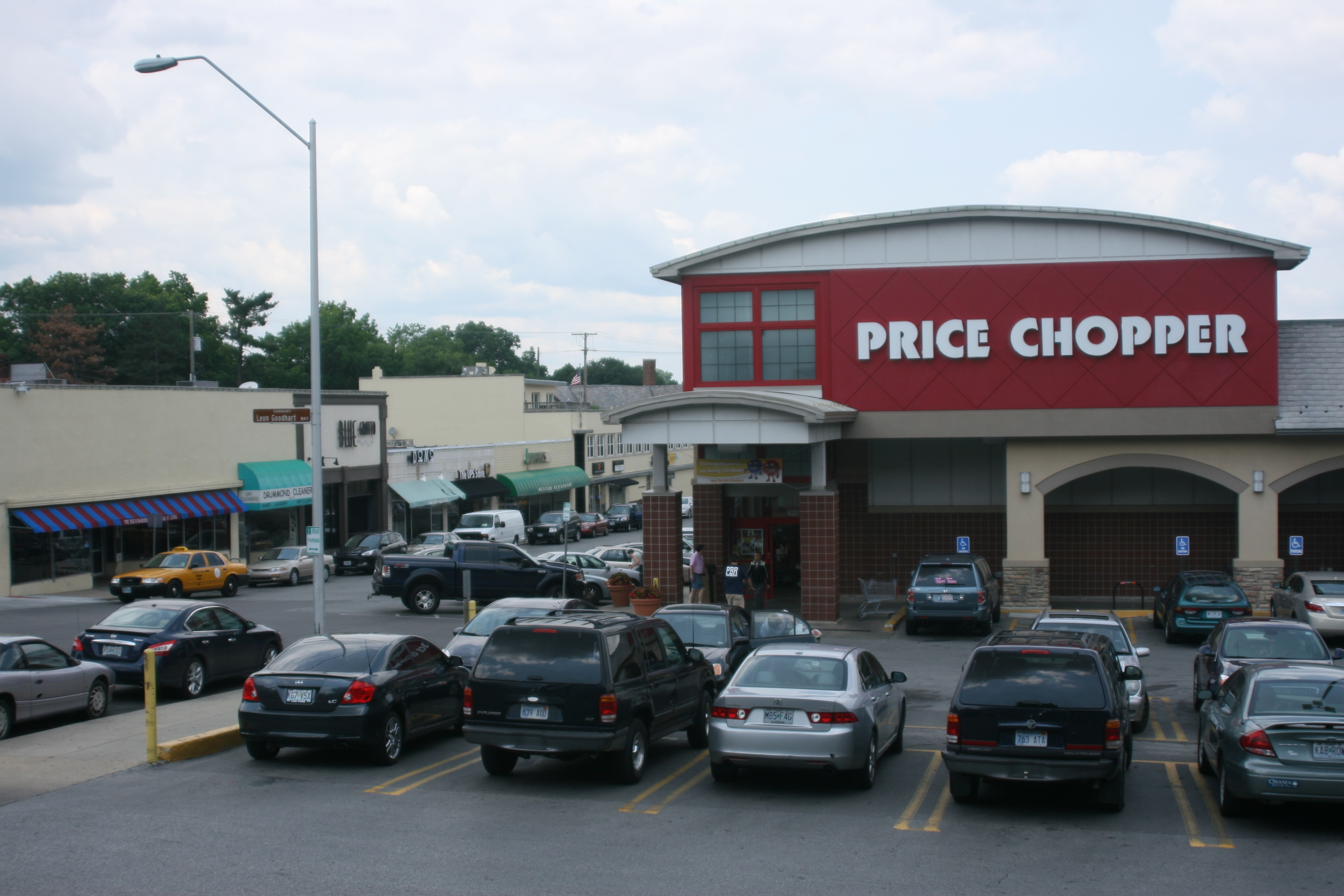
Price Chopper in Brookside, Kansas City, MO.
