= Harps Food Stores =

American supermarket chain

Harps Food Stores, Inc.

- Storefront of a Harps Food Store in De Soto, Kansas
- Trade name: Harps; Harps Marketplace
- Formerly: Harps Cash Grocery (1930–1964)
- Type: Private, employee-owned
- Industry: Retail (Supermarket)
- Founded: 1930; 96 years ago Springdale, Arkansas, U.S.
- Founder: Harvard and Floy Harp
- Headquarters: Springdale, Arkansas, U.S.
- Number of locations: 125 (2025)
- Area served: Arkansas (74); Kansas (2); Louisiana (1); Missouri (17); Oklahoma (31)
- Key people: Kim Eskew (CEO, Chairman, President)
- Products: Bakery, dairy, deli, frozen foods, general grocery, meat, produce, seafood, snacks, liquor
- Brands: Harp's Food Stores; The Markets; Food Rite
- Services: Money services; Online shopping and home delivery; Fuel; Grocery; Pharmacy
- Revenue: ▲$1.01 billion (2021)
- Number of employees: 4,999 (2021)
- Website: www.harpsfood.com; www.themarketsonline.com; www.myfoodrite.com

Harps Food Stores, Inc. is an American regional chain of supermarkets based in Springdale, Arkansas. The company operates 151 supermarkets located in the U.S. states of Arkansas, Oklahoma, Missouri, Kansas, Mississippi, Louisiana, and in summer 2026, Tennessee and Kentucky. The company sells both groceries and sporting goods in some larger stores, with several locations also incorporating pharmacies and gas stations.

In addition to its flagship Harps brand, the company also operates grocery stores under four banners: Food4Less, in southwest Missouri (under license from brand owner Kroger); CashSaver in Tulsa; 10Box Cost-Plus; Warehouse Market in Tulsa; and The Markets in Louisiana and Mississippi. The company additionally operates a franchise of Ace Hardware in Charleston, Arkansas, Jay, Oklahoma, and Dexter, Missouri. The stores are supplied by Kansas City, Kansas-based Associated Wholesale Grocers. The company is valued around $550 million, and employed 5,300 people as of 2020.

== History ==
Harps Food Stores was founded by Harvard and Floy Harp in 1930.

In the early 1950s, Harvard and Floy’s oldest son, Don, had joined them in the business. In 1964, Harps became a small chain with the opening of its second store in North Springdale.

By the 1960s, Harvard and Floy’s two other sons, Gerald and Reland, joined the business. Following the death of Harvard in 1968, Don became the CEO and president. Don ran the company until his retirement in 1994, when he was succeeded by Gerald.

In 2001, Harps became employee-owned after buying company shares from the Harp family.

The company announced plans on March 11, 2020, to expand further throughout northern Arkansas and southeastern Missouri, with an acquisition of 20 additional store locations from Fredericktown, Missouri-based Town and Country Grocers. In 2022, Harps bought the CV's Family Foods locations in Fort Smith.

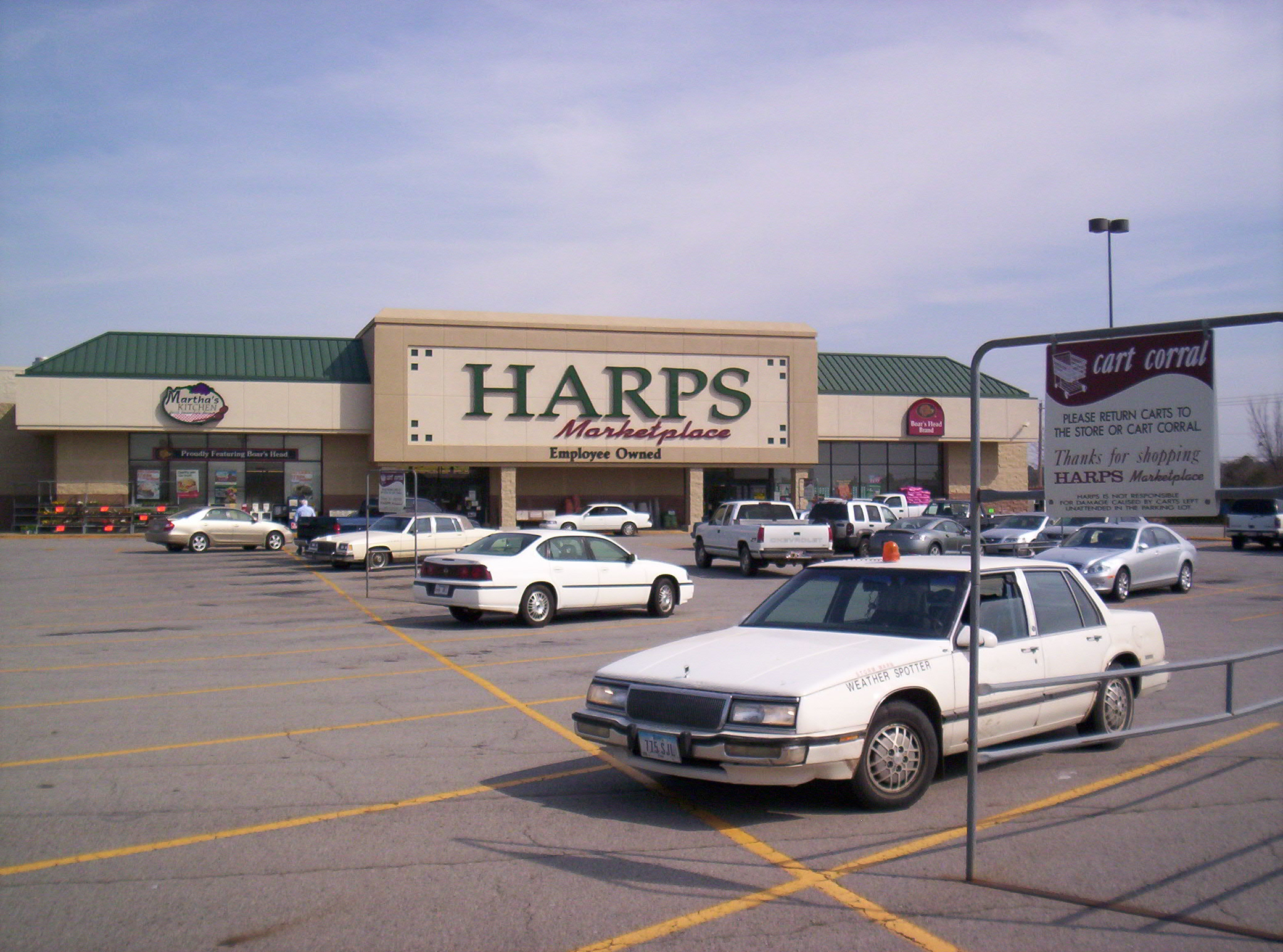
HARPS Marketplace store c. 2007 - Fort Smith, Arkansas

Storefront of Harps Food Store in De Soto, Kansas

== Locations (as of 10/26/2025) ==
Front of Harps Store in Jonesboro, Arkansas

=== Arkansas ===
- Alma
- Bald Knob
- Batesville
- Bella Vista
- Benton
- Bentonville
- Brookland
- Bull Shoals
- Cabot
- Calico Rock
- Centerton
- Charleston (includes Fuel Center)
- Clarksville
- Conway (2)
- Danvile
- Dover
- Elkins
- England
- Fayetteville (3 + 1 Marketplace)
- Fort Smith (4 + 1 Marketplace)
- Gentry
- Gravette
- Green Forest
- Greenbrier
- Greenwood
- Harrison (plus one in Bellefonte)
- Haskell
- Heber Springs
- Highland
- Hot Springs (Lake Hamilton and Piney)
- Huntsville
- Jasper
- Jonesboro
- Lavaca
- Lincoln
- Lowell
- Mansfield
- Marshall
- Mayflower
- Mena
- Morrilton
- Mountain Home (2)
- Mountain View
- Newark
- Ozark
- Paris
- Perryville
- Piggott
- Pocahontas
- Prairie Grove
- Rector
- Rogers (includes Pharmacy)
- Searcy
- Shirley
- Siloam Springs
- Springdale (3)
- Van Buren (includes Pharmacy, plus one in Cedarville)
- Vilonia
- Waldron
- West Fork
- Yellville

=== Kansas ===
- Baxter Springs
- De Soto

=== Louisiana ===
- Sunset

=== Missouri ===
- Airport Drive (Joplin area)
- Alton
- Anderson
- Dexter
- Doniphan
- Farmington
- Fredericktown
- Jackson
- Kennett
- Malden
- Marble Hill
- Noel
- Park Hills
- Poplar Bluff (Pharmacy only, store replaced by 10Box Cost Plus)
- Potosi
- Richmond
- Seligman
- Thayer

=== Oklahoma ===
- Bixby
- Chelsea
- Chouteau
- Collinsville
- Coweta
- Dewey
- Fairview
- Fort Gibson
- Glenpool
- Gore
- Grove
- Harrah
- Heavener
- Inola
- Jay
- Miami
- Newkirk
- Norman
- Oologah
- Pawhuska
- Poteau
- Prague
- Roland
- Salina
- Spiro
- Stilwell
- Vian
- Warner
- Watonga
- Westville
