= Strack & Van Til =

Northwest Indiana grocery store chain

- Company type: Private
- Industry: Retail, Grocery
- Founded: 1959
- Headquarters: Highland, Indiana, U.S.
- Number of locations: 22 (21 SVT, 1 Town & Country)
- Key people: Jeff Strack, President/CEO; Phil Latchford, CFO; Michael Tyson, CMO
- Products: Grocery, Dairy, Frozen, Organic, Produce, Deli, Meat, Bakery, Floral, Alcohol, General merchandise
- Owner: Hy-Vee
- Website: www.strackandvantil.com

Strack & Van Til is a grocery store chain with locations in Northwest Indiana. Stores operate under the banners of Strack & Van Til and Town & Country Food Market.

On May 2, 2017, an involuntary petition under Chapter 7 of the US Bankruptcy Code was filed against Central Grocers, Inc, parent company of SVT, LLC. in the US Bankruptcy Court for the Northern District of Illinois. The petitioning creditors were The Coca-Cola Company, General Mills, Inc., Mars Financial Services, and Post Consumer Brands.

The remaining open stores in Northwest Indiana were sold in bankruptcy auction to the Strack and Van Til families and the Indiana Grocery Group. All Strack & Van Til stores in Northeast Illinois were closed.

== History ==
=== Founding ===
In 1930, Meinhard Nissen and Ernie Strack opened the Royal Blue grocery store in downtown Griffith, Indiana. Their partnership lasted until 1943. In 1946, Strack built an additional store. In 1936, Nick Van Til, a grocery delivery boy, entered into a partnership with his employer. His partner later sold him the store. Van Til grew the business by adding many product lines and opening earlier in the day. In October 1960 Ernie Strack and Nick Van Til partnered and opened their first Strack & Van Til in Highland, Indiana. Strack & Van Til has grown to be one of the leading grocery chains in the Chicago metropolitan area.

=== Expansion ===
By 2012, the chain reached 30 stores. On November 27, 2012, it was announced that Strack & Van Til would purchase seven stores from WiseWay Supermarkets. WiseWay Supermarkets started in Gary, Indiana, in 1940. Before the acquisition it operated eight stores in the region under the name WiseWay and PayLow. WiseWay Supermarkets retained ownership of one store located in Winfield, Indiana (zero in 2022). Both WiseWay and Strack's were supplied by Central Grocers Cooperative. WiseWay stores in Chesterton, Hobart and Valparaiso were rebranded as Strack & Van Til (Winfield location converted to Strack & Van Til later in 2022), while PayLow stores in Gary and Merrillville were rebranded as Ultra Foods (The Merrillville location later re-opened as a Strack & Van Til in 2017). As a result of the acquisition, one Ultra Foods location was closed. It was located across from one of the acquired stores. By 2014, the chain had 38 stores.

=== Store closures and sale to Strack and Van Til families and Indiana Grocery Group ===
On March 2, 2017, Strack & Van Til announced the closure of six stores, four Ultra Foods stores and two Strack & Van Til stores. Following the announcement of those closures, parent company, Central Grocers announced the closure of nine Ultra Foods stores located in Illinois. In addition, 22 Strack and Van Tils will be up for sale. On May 15, 2017, Jewel-Osco made a bid to purchase all 19 Strack & Van Til grocery stores for $100 million. The Jewel-Osco bid was ultimately unsuccessful and the stores were sold in the bankruptcy auction to the Strack and Van Til families and the Indiana Grocery Group.

As Central Grocers went bankrupt after being around for 100 years in 2017, Strack & Van Til made an agreement with Associated Wholesale Grocers, Inc., makers of Best Choice and Always Save brands of items, to compensate for the now gone Centrella.

Strack & Van Til returned to expansion in 2021 with the purchase of Tysen's Country Market in Demotte, Indiana. The store will take the Strack & Van Til name.

=== Acquisition by Hy-Vee ===
On April 17, 2024, the chain announced it was being acquired by Hy-Vee, a Midwestern grocery chain headquartered in West Des Moines, Iowa. The stores will retain their current branding and become a subsidiary of Hy-Vee, according to the news release. All 22 store locations in Northwest Indiana and the Chicago, Illinois, suburbs will remain open as Strack & Van Til.

Hy-Vee did not reveal how much it is paying for the chain, but spokesperson Tina Potthoff said the purchase is one of the largest in Hy-Vee's history. Also privately owned, Strack & Van Til will become a subsidiary of Hy-Vee but will retain its own logos, name, and branding, Potthoff said.

Having previously announced locations in Zionsville, Indiana and Noblesville, Indiana for Indiana expansion, Hy-Vee says those timelines for opening may now shift, but are still in the plans for expansion. “We plan to continue to build in these areas," Potthoff said. "Due to this acquisition, we are reviewing and finalizing our construction timeline for those locations.”

Hy-Vee also announced a decision to discontinue the Best Choice and Always Save labels, and add the Hy-Vee labels That's Smart, Crav'n Flavor, Simply Done, Tippy Toes, TopCare, CharKing, Good Graces, Full Circle Market, and Paws.

The first location renovated under Hy-Vee ownership was in Lowell, Indiana.
