= CCA Global Partners =

American shared service company

- Formerly: Carpet Co-op of America
- Type: Shared services cooperative
- Industry: Carpeting, Purchasing cooperative
- Founded: 1984; 42 years ago in Manchester, New Hampshire, United States
- Founders: Howard Brodsky and Alan Greenberg
- Headquarters: Manchester, New Hampshire and St. Louis, Missouri, United States
- Area served: USA and Canada
- Key people: Eric Bernstein (CEO), Howard Brodsky (Chairman)
- Products: Shared services for carpet and other product and service providers
- Number of employees: 300 (2017)
- Website: ccaglobalpartners.com

CCA Global Partners, formerly Carpet Co-op of America, is an American shared services membership purchasing cooperative.

The company was founded in 1984 as a carpet cooperative business in Manchester, New Hampshire. It has since expanded into 14 co-ops covering a variety of different industries. CCA Global Partners includes stores throughout the United States, Canada and other countries.

The late Alan Greenberg together with Howard Brodsky were co-founders, with Brodsky acting as chairman.

== History ==
Howard Brodsky and the late Alan Greenberg started Carpet Co-op of America in 1984. The partners soon brought on Sandy Mishkin, and in 1985 they founded Carpet One with 13 carpet companies as their initial membership. Members paid $12,000 to join the cooperative, with no additional monthly franchise fee. After one year, the cooperative posted retail sales of $25 million for its then 26 members. The organization almost doubled its membership to 50 by the middle of 1986.

The company changed its name to CCA Global Partners in 2001. The same year the company acquired Ilucio, a lighting buying group, including its brands. Ilucio was renamed to Lighting One. By the year 2005, the company had approximately 650 shareholders and brought in about $9.6 billion in revenue.

In 2006, the cooperative held its first Global Summit, which included executives and business owners from all the company's divisions.

Alan Greenberg, co-founder, chairman and CEO, died from cancer in 2007. That year "Green Select" was launched which committed the company to a more environmentally friendly business model. The following year, 2008, Rick Bennet was appointed as the company's new CEO.

Brodsky and Greenberg were inducted into the Cooperative Hall of Fame of the US National Cooperative Business Association in 2009. Mishkin was awarded the first Floor Covering News Lifetime Achievement Award in 2010. In 2012, Mishkin was inducted into the World Floor Covering Association's (WRCA) Flooring Industry Hall of Fame.

In 2015, Brodsky began to promote cooperative businesses worldwide through the initiative termed: 'Cooperatives for a Better World.'

In October 2024, Brodsky was replaced as CEO by Eric Bernstein and Bennett was replaced by Keith Spano (president of Carpet One Floor & Home and president, Retail Groups) and Steve Sieracki (president of Flooring America, Flooring Canada, The Floor Trader and International Design Guild).

== Operations ==
As of 2017, CCA Global Partners had 110 employees in its headquarters in Manchester, New Hampshire, and 275 employees in their St. Louis, Missouri office, where the accounting, rebate system, legal department, and other operations are located.

=== Members ===
The following fall under CCA Global Partners:

- Carpet One Floor & Home:
- The Bike Cooperative: In 2003, CCA Global entered the biking industry when The Biking Solution joined. The company re-branded to the Bike Cooperative.
- Lighting One: A cooperative lighting company named Ilucio was founded in 1999 by Jeff Carmichael. When CCA Global Partners acquired some assets of Ilucio in 2001, Lighting One was started.
- BizUnite: BizUnite was founded in 2007, with its headquarters in Manchester, New Hampshire. In 2016, the company rebranded their services to Savings4Members.
- ProSource: Launched in 1991, ProSource Wholesale Floor Coverings allows access to a market in which they can sell to the trade in closed showrooms, and therefore grow in their own market.
- FEI Group: FEI is a group of flooring contractors. It is the parent company to Home Solutions, and MultiFamily Solutions by FloorExpo, Kitchen & Bath Experts, and Kitchen & Bath Alliance.
- The Floor Trader: Launched in 2005, this subsidiary is directed to the DIY customers and to benefit from the growing demand for hardwood flooring. The company changed its name to Floor Trader Outlet in 2015, and also moved its business model away from franchising and towards a cooperative model.
- CCA Sports Retail Services: began as an expansion of the Bike Cooperative in 2008. It is a retail service provider, with over 500 independent retail stores in the USA.
- Flooring America & Flooring Canada: Flooring America and the American Heart Association's Go Red for Women joined in 2006. In 2013, Flooring America started Pets for Patriots Sponsorship.
- InCarpets: based in Queensland, Australia became the first non-North American company to receive a license to become part of the CCA Global cooperative. The 26 stores of InCarpets joined in 1994.
- International Design Guild: In 1995, the International Design Guild was launched. It supports businesses in the interior design industry.
- Lionsbridge Contractor Group: The Lionsbridge Contractors Group was established in 2012 by CCA Global Partners to bring together insurance companies, contractors and insurance policy holders.
- CCA for Social Good: Formed in 2008, this company was formed to create smart systems for non-profit and childcare organizations. It services more than ten thousand childcare centers.
- Innovia Co-op (formerly COBO): is a cooperative of homeowner association and management companies that are independently owned. It was founded in 2012.

== Philanthropy ==
In 2005, the company created the CCA Relief Fund, which supports employees of CCA members who have been adversely affected by natural disasters.

CCA Global Partners began a golf tournament to raise funds for the Floor Covering Industry Foundation in 2003 to help employees with illnesses, disabilities or other serious issues.

== Recognition ==
- In 2006, the firm's website received a Webby Award in the Corporate Communications category.
- Howard Brodsky was honored by the Stephen Siller Tunnel to Towers Endowment in 2017 for his assistance supporting a project for special "smart homes" to wounded veterans.
- USA Weekend magazine and The Points of Light Foundation recognized Carpet One for their "Carpet One Makes a Difference" campaign.
- In March 2015, the World Floor Covering Association (WFCA) gave the Hawaii-based American Carpet One its Gold Standard Award for excellence in retailing.
- Business NH Magazine named CCA Global Partners one of the top companies to work for in 2002, 2013, 2015, and 2016.

== See also ==
- Collective buying power
- Purchasing cooperative
- Group purchasing organization
