= Associated Grocers of New England =

Associated Grocers Northeast (AGNE) is a retailers' cooperative serving over six hundred independent grocery stores and convenience stores, in Connecticut, Maine, Massachusetts, New Hampshire, New York, Rhode Island, Vermont, and Pennsylvania. It was founded in 1946 as New Hampshire Wholesale Grocers and took the present name in 1969. AGNE is a member of Retailer Owned Food Distributors & Associates. It distributes Food Club products in its stores. It is based in Pembroke, New Hampshire.

AG Northeast's corporate retail division operates 14 stores, including 5 stores in New Hampshire: Vista Foods (Laconia), Harvest Market (Wolfeboro), Sully's Superette (Goffstown), Sully's Superette (Allenstown), and Berlin Marketplace (Berlin). The company also operates 9 stores in Vermont: Londonderry Village Market (Londonderry), Stowe Village Market (Stowe), Village Market of Waterbury (Waterbury), Jericho Market (Jericho), Richmond Market & Beverage (Richmond), Shelburne Market (Shelburne), Woodstock Village Market (Woodstock), Essex Village Market (Essex Junction), and Newport Village Market (Newport).

== Notes ==
- Merrill, Scott (October 15, 2024). "2024 Best Companies to Work for: 18. Associated Grocers Northeast". Business NH Magazine. Manchester, NH.
