= Central Grocers Cooperative =

Former retailers' cooperative in the midwestern US

Central Grocers Cooperative, founded in 1917 as Central Wholesale Grocers, was a retailers' cooperative based in Joliet, Illinois, near Chicago. It distributed both brand name and private label goods branded as Centrella and Silver Cup Value Buy to about 400 member-owner grocery stores in Iowa, Indiana, Illinois, and Wisconsin.

It supplied several grocery stores in Indiana and Illinois, including Strack & Van Til (acquired in 1998), Town & Country, Key Market, and Ultra Foods. It also purchased a number of former Cub Foods locations in the Chicago area, some of which it operated as Strack and Van Til and Ultra Foods. Also Gray's Foods in Rockford. Fellow co-op Certified Grocers Midwest merged into Central Grocers in 2008. Prior to 2009, the company was headquartered in Franklin Park, Illinois.

As of 2013, it was the seventh largest grocery cooperative in the United States, with over $2 billion on consolidated annual sales.

On May 2, 2017, an involuntary petition under Chapter 7 of the U.S. Bankruptcy Code was filed against Central Grocers, Inc., in the U.S. Bankruptcy Court for the Northern District of Illinois. The petitioning creditors were The Coca-Cola Company, General Mills, Inc., Mars Financial Services, and Post Consumer Brands. On May 4, 2017, Central Grocers filed for Chapter 11 bankruptcy and plans to close their distribution center and sell 22 of its Strack and Van Til stores, plus seven of its Ultra stores. SuperValu subsequently agreed to buy the distribution center.
