= Deerpath Hill Estates =

Historic house in Illinois, United States

- Deerpath Hill Estates Historic District
- U.S. National Register of Historic Places
- U.S. Historic district
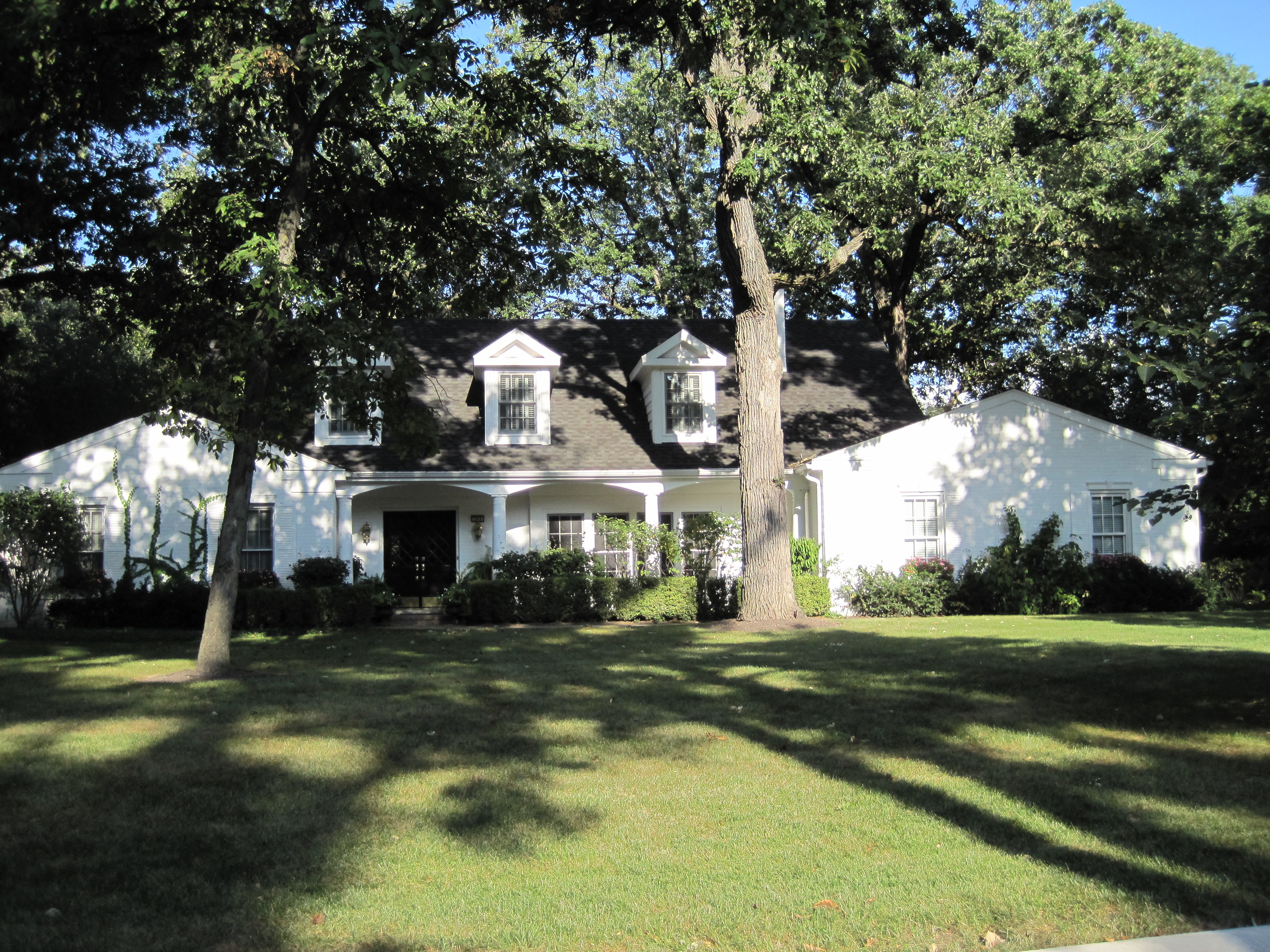
- House at 265 King Muir Road

- Location within Illinois Location within the United States
- Location: Roughly bounded by Northcliffe Way, King Muir Rd. and Waukegan Rd., Lake Forest, Illinois
- Coordinates: 42.24631°N 87.87054°W
- Area: 40 acres (16 ha)
- Built: 1926
- Built by: Turnbull, Henry K.
- Architect: Anderson, Stanley D.
- Architectural style: Tudor Revival, Colonial Revival
- MPS: Deerpath Hill Estates:an English Garden Development in Lake Forest, Illinois MPS
- NRHP reference No.: 06000676
- Added to NRHP: August 7, 2006

Deerpath Hill Estates is a residential development in western Lake Forest, Illinois. Developer Henry K. Turnbull and architect Stanley D. Anderson planned and built the original development in 1926. Turnbull and Anderson designed the development according to the principles of the City Beautiful Movement and the ideas of Howard Van Doren Shaw, Anderson's mentor. The individual houses were designed in popular revivalist styles, including English Tudor, Colonial, and French Norman. The development was the first in Lake Forest to be planned and controlled entirely by its developer.

== History ==
Turnbull and Anderson expanded their development multiple times after its opening. Turnbull purchased the 20-acre (8.1 ha) McKinlock estate in 1928 for the First Addition. The Second Addition came in 1929–30, when Turnbull bought and redeveloped the 21-acre (8.5 ha) Frank Hibbard Estate; only one house in this addition, at 380 Chiltern Drive, was designed by Anderson. Another house built by Turnbull at 965 Castlegate Court is just outside the First Addition and marked the northern entrance to the estate. The Great Depression bankrupted Turnbull and his development, and no new development occurred at the estates until the 1950s.

The original development and the First Addition are listed on the National Register of Historic Places as the Deerpath Hill Estates Historic District. In addition, the Frank Hibbard Estate House and the Turnbull-built houses at 380 Chiltern Drive and 965 Castlegate Court are individually listed in the National Register.
