= Leader Drug Stores =

Network of pharmacies

Leader Drug Stores is a network of over 3,100 independently owned and operated pharmacies. It has a business affiliation with Cardinal Health, which sponsors the network and owns the name "Leader Drug Stores". Cardinal Health also owns the franchise chain The Medicine Shoppe. It operates like a retailers' cooperative, though it is not owned by its members.
