= Valu-Rite =

Valu-Rite is a network of over 4,000 independently owned and operated pharmacies established in 1979. It has a business affiliation with McKesson Pharmaceuticals, which sponsors the network and owns the name "Valu-Rite". It operates like a retailers' cooperative, though it is not owned by its members.

Radio commercials for Valu-Rite in the 1980s used spokesmen Dick Clark and Tom Bosley.

In a 2005 nationwide United States survey, Valu-Rite "was the highest-rated pharmacy overall."
