= Mica DIY =

Mica
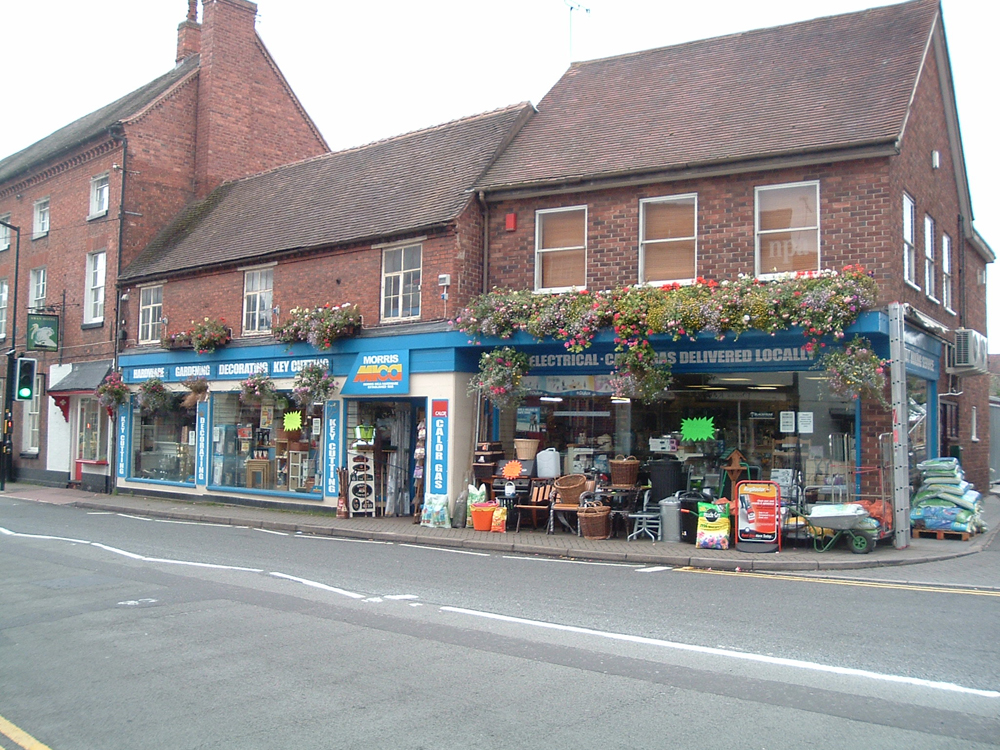
- Trade name: Mica DIY Ltd
- Type: Private limited company
- Industry: Retail
- Founded: 5 October 1995; 31 years ago
- Headquarters: Stone, Staffordshire, United Kingdom
- Area served: United Kingdom
- Brands: Mica
- Services: Shared marketing, group buying and retail support
- Owner: Retailer-owned co-operative
- Members: 60
- Website: www.micahardware.co.uk

Mica DIY is a British cooperative trading group (also referred to as a symbol group) for independent do it yourself (DIY) and hardware retailers in the United Kingdom, who work together for group benefit in marketing, buying and retail support. It has around 60 members, including all four nations of the United Kingdom. The majority are in England – currently around 54 - with six each in Wales and Scotland and four in Northern Ireland. Their size and locations varies.

Its headquarters are in Stone, Staffordshire, where it has been based since 1996. It was set up with the assistance of Mica South Africa, a company set up ten years earlier with a similar model. Unlike other similar groups, Mica does not have its own warehousing. Instead, it works with suppliers who deliver direct and has a relationship with Stax Trade Centre, which acts as the group's preferred wholesaler.

Mica DIY Ltd became a registered co-operative retailer group in 2010, and had previously since its inception been majority-owned by its retailer members. Its stated aim is to assist its retailer members to compete with the larger corporate stores. The business is owned and directed by its members, but management-run. It is similar to Spar or Nisa in many ways – working for hardware and DIY stores as they do in the grocery industry.

== History ==
Independent DIY retail in the UK has been dramatically squeezed since the arrival of the chain stores and, more recently, the online marketplace. In September 2014, spending in DIY/garden category was at £69 million for independents in the UK, but £700 million for multiples, suggesting a current market share of under 9%.

Mica was set up in the UK in 1995/6 by two former senior members of staff at the British Hardware Federation trading under the name Mica (UK) Limited. It grew quickly to over 120 retailers by 2005, and in 2008 launched its own warehousing facilities.

The timing was unfortunate due to the 2008 financial crisis. As a result, the business fell into administration on 8 July 2009 and the managing director at the time, Belinda Barnard, stated that there were many contributing factors to its demise including that "Mica faced some difficulty with certain branded suppliers who, after being encouraged not to supply the Mica Vault, refused to put their products through the distribution facility".

Following the administration, Barnard resigned, and members led by a new interim chairman, Jan Nicolson, voted to continue with the Mica brand and to set up a new company with reduced overheads. Companies House lists Mica DIY, previously known as Mica UK Management Ltd, as being incorporated in 1999. This holding company was renamed to become Mica DIY at the time of Mica UK Ltd's administration in 2009.

== Co-operative status ==
The new managing director, Steve Ball, worked with members and suppliers to set up the restored group, and in the autumn its business model was changed by the board of directors to a co-operative, as Nicolson stepped down as interim chairman and was replaced by his deputy, David Morris. The group, now of 60 members, officially voted to become a co-operative at the March 2010 AGM at which point Ball resigned and was appointed as company secretary and CEO.

The company then worked with co-operatives UK to set up its new co-operative structure and also to secure additional funding from the co-operatives loan fund.

According to company accounts submitted for 2012, the company's then assets were £484,297.

== Trade shows ==
Mica took the South African model of trade show Mica Market and held an annual UK Mica Market in October, the last in 2008. The format was a mini tradeshow hosting top suppliers and brands, including in 2008 Draper Tools and Brabantia, inviting Mica members to attend and place orders.

From 2011, Mica DIY launched a new format show for the industry, the Mica Exchange. Held in March, this had a sit down appointments format rather than trade show stands, with booked appointment slots in the style of speed dating. Numbers were limited and the event sold out. It received positive reviews from both suppliers, who included, Crown Paints, Draper Tools and Henkel and Mica members, and has been repeated each year since. The Exchange also includes the annual Mica AGM, a gala dinner and Mica Awards. The 2011 event was held in Derby. Later Exchanges have been held in Bristol in 2012, Edinburgh in 2013 and Cardiff in 2014.

Mica has also regularly attended the national industry trade show, Totally DIY|Tools, using it as a vehicle to recruit new members.
