= Do It Best =

American hardware retailers' cooperative

Do it Best
- Type: Retailers' cooperative
- Industry: Retail
- Founded: 1945; 81 years ago as Hardware Wholesalers, Inc.
- Founder: Arnold Gerberding
- Headquarters: Fort Wayne, Indiana
- Number of locations: Thousands of member-owned locations throughout the United States and more than 50 other countries
- Products: 67,000
- Brands: Do it Best, True Value, Hardware Hank
- Revenue: $4.7 billion
- Subsidiaries: True Value
- Website: www.doitbestonline.com

Do it Best Corp., formerly known as Hardware Wholesalers, Inc. (HWI), is a member-owned hardware, lumber, and building materials cooperative based in Fort Wayne, Indiana. Do it Best Corp. is the second-largest co-op in the industry with over $6 billion in annual sales.

== History ==
Hardware Wholesalers, Inc. (HWI) was founded by Arnold Gerberding in 1945 in Fort Wayne, Indiana, with the investments of 100 independent business owners in Illinois, Indiana, Michigan and Ohio. Gerberding used the co-op model so HWI members could get better volume pricing from vendors by buying together rather than on their own. Independent hardware stores became members of the cooperative and its sole shareholders. The first warehouse facility opened in 1948, and HWI added a private truck delivery system in 1955.

Don Wolf succeeded Gerberding and opened HWI's first distribution center outside of Fort Wayne in Cape Girardeau, Missouri. In 2014, Do it Best moved that distribution center to Sikeston, Missouri. Today, there are nine centers located across the US as well as three regional lumber offices.

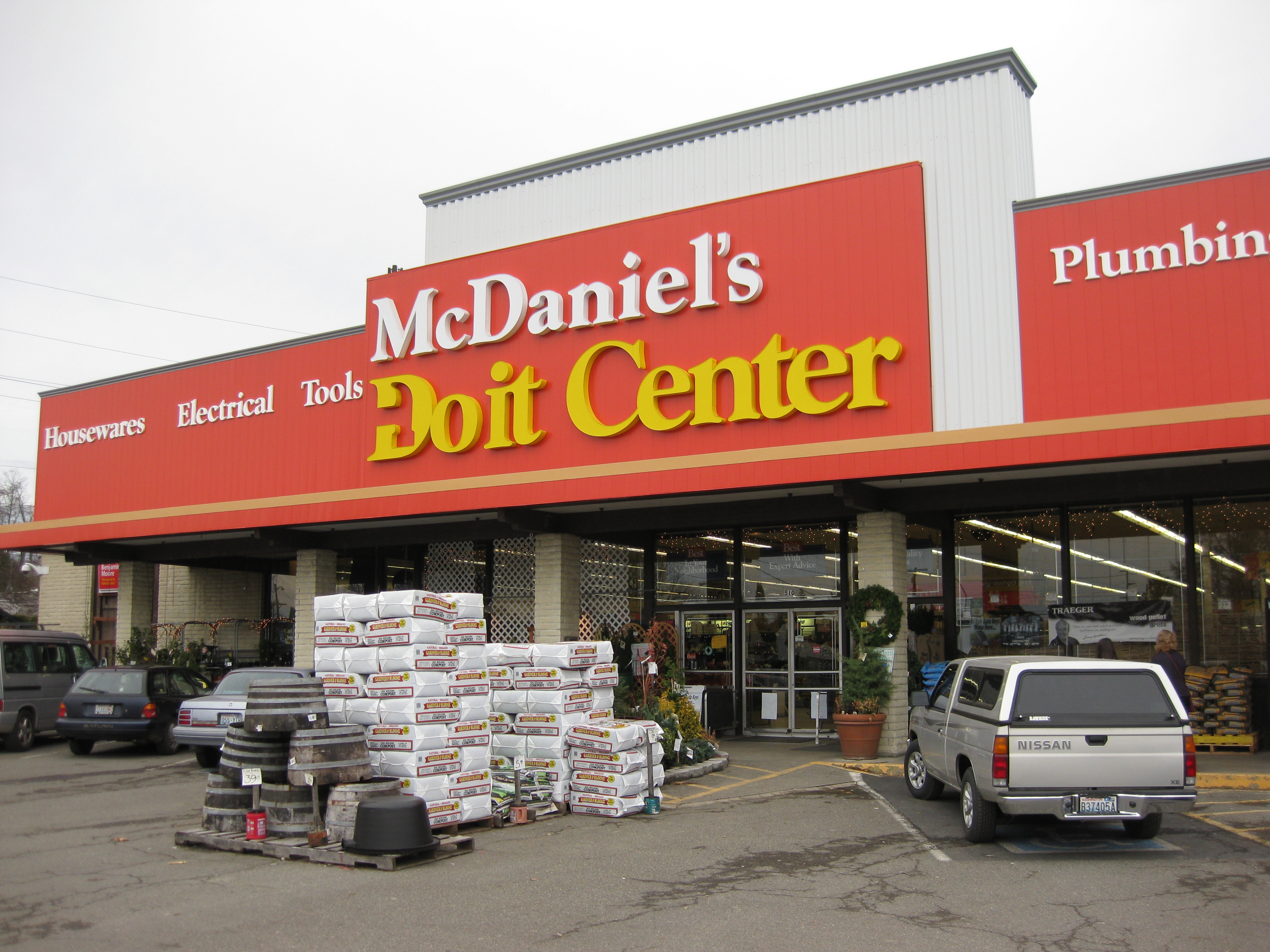
McDaniel's Do it Center Snohomish, Washington

Mike McClelland succeeded Don Wolf as president in 1992. During his tenure, the co-op expanded internationally, primarily in Central and South America and the Caribbean. In 1998, HWI combined with Our Own Hardware, a Minnesota-based regional co-op. As a result of the merger, HWI changed its name to Do it Best Corp. In 2002, Bob Taylor, a former member-owner with stores in Virginia Beach, Virginia, took over as president and CEO and has led the company into new markets supporting commercial/industrial and web-only businesses until his retirement in January 2016. Following Taylor's retirement in early 2016, Dan Starr became the company's fifth president and CEO.

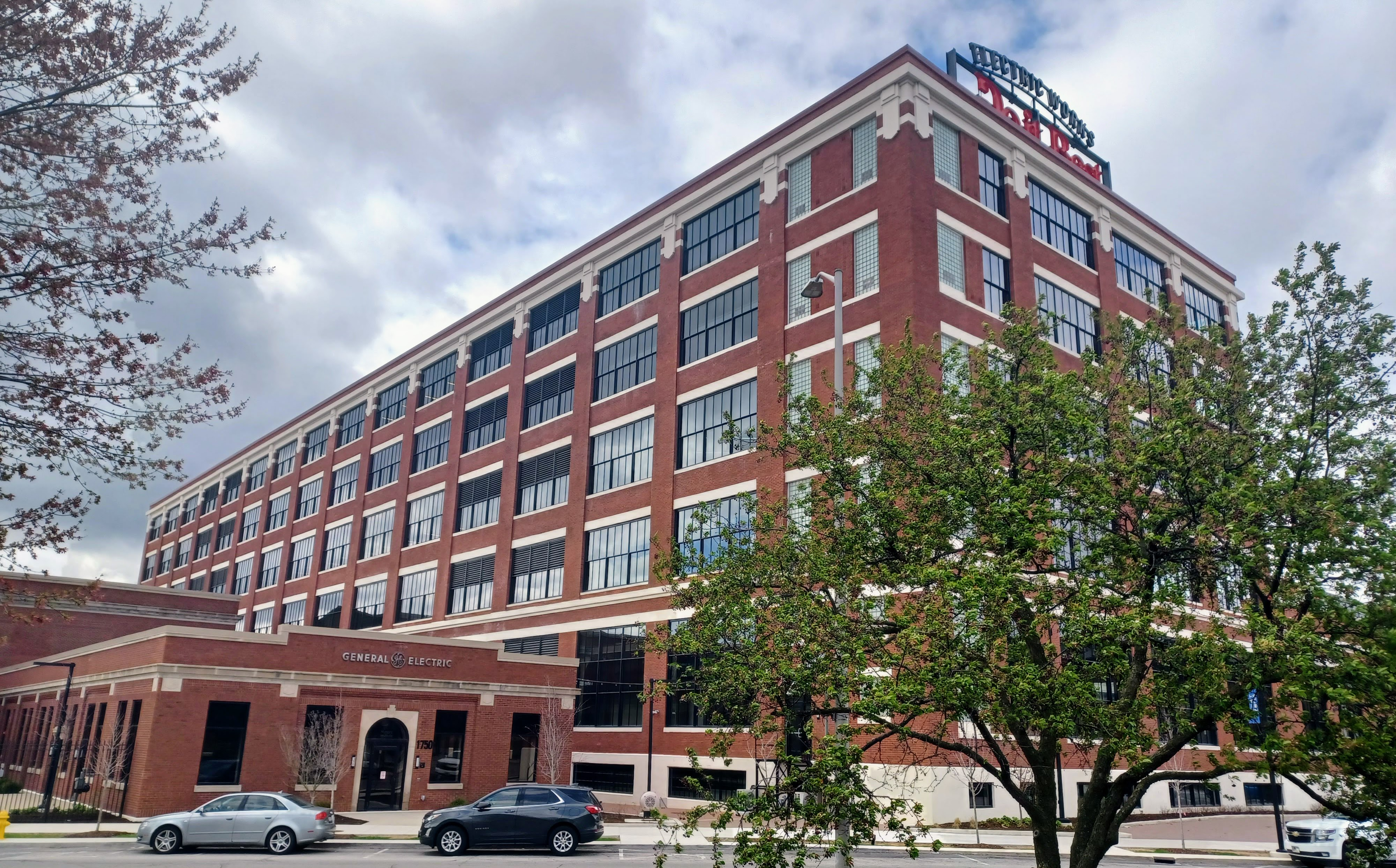
Since 2022, Do it Best's corporate headquarters in Fort Wayne has been located on the Electric Works campus (Building 19 pictured above).

As of 2022, Do it Best was the largest privately held company in the state of Indiana. In December 2022, Do it Best relocated its corporate headquarters to the Electric Works campus in Fort Wayne, becoming the anchor tenant operating out of Building 26. In March 2024, United Hardware, a regional hardware cooperative based in Minnesota, agreed to merge with Do it Best. The merger would include 700 store locations, a distribution center in Milbank, SD, and the Hardware Hank brand. The merger was overwhelmingly approved by United Hardware shareholders on April 5, 2024.

In November 2024, Do it Best successfully acquired True Value Company out of bankruptcy for $153 million. The acquisition included inventory, brand rights, and paint manufacturing facility plus over 4,500 True Value store locations bringing the total locations served by Do it Best to over 8,000.
