= Val-Test Distributors =

The Val-Test Group is an American buying and marketing group for a collective of wholesalers, distributors, dealers and retailers in hardware, paint sundries, electrical, plumbing, housewares, marine, automotive and the decorative art industries.

It was founded in 1962.

== Competitors ==
- PRO Group
- Distribution America
