= Unified Grocers =

Wholesale grocery cooperative

Unified Grocers, Inc.
- Industry: Retail (Supermarket)
- Founded: 1922
- Fate: Merged with SuperValu
- Revenue: Approx. $3.8 billion (2016)

Unified Grocers, originally Unified Western Grocers, was a retailer-owned wholesale grocery cooperative that supplies independent supermarkets in the Western United States. It was formed in 1999 by the merger of two West Coast cooperatives, one based in Oregon and Certified Grocers, a long term leader in Los Angeles. In 2007, it acquired Associated Grocers of Seattle, Washington, and shortened its name to Unified Grocers. The company has its headquarters in Commerce, California.

Unified Grocers was the largest retailer-owned wholesaler in the western United States. They served more than 3,000 retail stores and recorded annual sales over $4 billion in 2009. There were over 375 co-op members and customers as of 2017.

In April 2017, the company announced that it had entered into a merger agreement with SuperValu, in which SuperValu would acquire Unified Grocers, at a cost of around $375 million. Unified is now a wholly owned subsidiary of SuperValu. The transaction was completed on June 23, 2017.
