= Associated Grocers =

Retailers' cooperative

Associated Grocers, Inc.
- Industry: Food and general merchandise wholesaler
- Founded: Seattle, Washington (1934)
- Fate: Acquired by Unified Western Grocers, to form Unified Grocers
- Headquarters: Seattle, Washington; Renton, Washington; Clackamas, Oregon; Tukwila, Washington
- Key people: Ron Brake, Chairman; John S. Runyan, President and CEO
- Products: Groceries and general merchandise
- Revenue: $794.8 Mil (sales) (2004)
- Number of employees: 780

Associated Grocers was an American retailers' cooperative that distributed full lines of groceries and general merchandise. Founded in Seattle in 1934, the cooperative provided retail services to independent grocers in Washington, Oregon, Alaska, Hawaii, and Guam. The cooperative served over 300 members’ retail locations with 2004 sales of $794.8 million before it was acquired by another cooperative, Unified Western Grocers on September 30, 2007.

== Executive officers ==
- John S. Runyan – president and chief executive officer
- Steve Numata – chief financial officer
- Craig W. Palm – vice president and general counsel
- Carl Morley – vice president, fresh foods
- Craig K. Calton – vice president, marketing and sales
- David L. Brumley – vice president, human resources
- John Wiedmann – vice president, wholesale operations
- Gene F. Puhrmann – chief information officer
