= Purchasing cooperative =

Type of cooperative arrangement

A purchasing cooperative is a type of cooperative arrangement, often among businesses or governments, to agree to aggregate demand to get lower prices from selected suppliers. Retailers' cooperatives are a form of purchasing cooperative. Cooperatives are often used by businesses or government agencies to reduce costs of procurement. One such organization is Sourcewell, a Minnesota-based service cooperative that offers competitively solicited contracts to government, education, and nonprofit organizations nationwide. Purchasing cooperatives like Sourcewell are frequently used by governmental entities, since they are required to follow laws requiring competitive bidding above certain thresholds. In the United States, counties, municipalities, schools, colleges and universities in the majority of states can sign interlocal agreements or cooperative contracts that allow them to legally use contracts that were procured by another governmental entity. The National Association of State Procurement Officials (NASPO) reported increasing use of cooperative purchasing practices in its 2016 survey of state procurement.

According to the National Cooperative Business Association (NCBA) website, there are approximately 250 purchasing cooperatives in the United States. The NCBA, a trusted organization promoting cooperative businesses, provides valuable resources and information on various cooperative sectors, including purchasing cooperatives. These cooperatives play a significant role in aggregating the purchasing power of businesses across different industries to achieve cost savings and other benefits. The National Association of State Procurement Officials (NASPO) reported increasing use of cooperative purchasing practices in its 2016 survey of state procurement. NASPO has noted the increasing popularity of cooperative purchasing but also recognizes that, like any practice, "it can be done well - or poorly".

== Benefits of purchasing cooperatives ==
1. Cost Savings: The most significant advantage of joining a purchasing cooperative is the potential for cost savings. By leveraging the collective buying power of its members, the cooperative can negotiate better pricing, terms, and conditions with suppliers. These savings can be substantial, allowing members to reduce their procurement costs and improve their bottom line.
2. Increased Efficiency: Purchasing cooperatives streamline the procurement process by centralizing purchasing activities. This centralized approach eliminates redundancy and administrative burdens for individual members, allowing them to focus on their core competencies and strategic objectives. Additionally, cooperatives often provide tools and resources to facilitate purchasing, such as online catalogs, order management systems, and supply chain analytics.
3. Access to Quality Suppliers: Cooperatives often have extensive networks and established relationships with reputable suppliers. By joining a cooperative, members gain access to a pre-vetted pool of suppliers that have been evaluated for quality, reliability, and competitive pricing. This helps ensure that members can procure goods and services from trusted sources, reducing the risk of dealing with unreliable or subpar vendors.
4. Collective Influence: As a collective entity, purchasing cooperatives wield significant purchasing power in the market. This influence allows them to negotiate favorable terms, influence product development, and shape industry standards. By working together, members can have a stronger voice and greater leverage to shape their respective industries.
5. Knowledge Sharing and Collaboration: Purchasing cooperatives often foster a culture of knowledge sharing and collaboration among their members. Members can exchange best practices, industry insights, and market intelligence, enabling them to stay informed about industry trends and make informed purchasing decisions. This collaborative environment can lead to improved operational efficiencies and competitive advantages.

== Purchasing cooperatives vs RFPs ==
Purchasing cooperatives offer an alternative to traditional Request for Proposal (RFP) processes by enabling organizations—such as government agencies, educational institutions, and non-profits—to pool their buying power and access competitively procured contracts.

=== Streamlined procurement process ===
Instead of issuing individual RFPs, cooperative members can simply join the cooperative and obtain access to pre-negotiated contracts. This reduces the administrative effort required to develop, solicit, and award contracts, allowing organizations to expedite procurement timelines.

=== Cost savings and scale ===
By aggregating demand, purchasing cooperatives secure volume-based discounts and favorable terms that individual organizations might not achieve on their own. Vendors benefit from higher-volume sales through fewer—but larger—bids.

=== Quality, compliance, and supplier relationships ===
Cooperative purchasing agreements involve a vetting process that ensures access to qualified, reliable suppliers, often including contract features like warranties and compliance provisions. They also support compliance with procurement regulations, reducing risks and simplifying audits.

=== Efficiency and administrative relief ===
Cooperatives handle much of the procurement burden—such as market research, solicitation, evaluation, and contract negotiation—which significantly reduces the workload on member organizations.

=== Long-term collaboration ===
Membership in a purchasing cooperative can foster ongoing relationships and repeat business opportunities between participating organizations and suppliers.

== Examples ==
An example of a purchasing cooperative is Harris County's Department of Education (HCDE) in Texas, which has created three procurement cooperatives:

- Choice Facility Partners, a facility services cooperative which serves government bodies throughout Texas and elsewhere in the United States
- Gulf Coast Cooperative, a food cooperative primarily serving schools, and
- HCDE Purchasing Cooperative, offering more than 275 vendor contracts for commodities.

Various schools, colleges and universities, municipalities, counties, municipal utility districts and other governmental entities sign an interlocal contract with HCDE, thus becoming members that can access any of the multitude of competitively bid and legally awarded contracts available through their cooperatives. To optimize processes, these three cooperatives were combined into Choice Partners national cooperative in 2012. Through use of Choice Partners, HCDE generates revenues to support the school districts within Harris County.

In a similar way, Catholic parishes in the Archdiocese of Cincinnati, Ohio, have established a cooperative purchasing process to combine buying power and reduce costs.

Missouri State Statutes (Chapter 34, Chapter 37 and Chapter 67) authorize the State's Division of Purchasing to conduct a cooperative purchasing program, and allow eligible local governments, political subdivisions, and quasi-public governmental bodies to participate in the program.

== Costs ==
Many cooperative purchasing programs levy charges for usage and access. Fees may be assessed as an annual enrolment fee or a transaction fee such as a levy of 1% or 2% on the value of every purchase.

Purchasing cooperatives typically generate revenue to sustain their operations and cover administrative costs by charging fees to vendors or suppliers. These fees are designed to compensate the cooperative for the services it provides in facilitating transactions and managing the procurement process on behalf of its members. The specific fee structure may vary depending on the cooperative and the industry it operates in, but some common methods of fee collection include:

1. Membership Fees: Purchasing cooperatives may require vendors to become members and pay an annual membership fee. This fee grants vendors access to the cooperative's network of members and the opportunity to bid on contracts or supply goods and services to the cooperative's members. Membership fees often vary based on the size and scope of the vendor's business.
2. Rebates or Commissions: In addition to membership fees, purchasing cooperatives may negotiate rebates or commissions with vendors based on the volume of purchases made by cooperative members. These rebates or commissions are typically a percentage of the total sales generated by the cooperative's members for a particular vendor. They provide an incentive for vendors to offer competitive pricing and preferential terms to the cooperative's members.
3. Administrative Fees: Purchasing cooperatives may impose administrative fees on vendors to cover the costs associated with managing contracts, coordinating procurement activities, and providing support services. These fees help offset the expenses incurred by the cooperative in maintaining systems, personnel, and infrastructure required for efficient procurement operations. Administrative fees can be structured as a flat fee per transaction or as a percentage of the value of each transaction.
4. Marketing or Advertising Fees: Some purchasing cooperatives may charge vendors marketing or advertising fees to promote their products or services within the cooperative's network. These fees are typically used to fund marketing campaigns, trade shows, or promotional activities that increase the visibility of vendors and drive sales. Marketing fees can be based on the vendor's participation level or tied to specific marketing initiatives.

While these fees contribute to the financial sustainability of purchasing cooperatives, they are generally intended to be fair and reasonable. The cooperative's goal is to create a mutually beneficial relationship between vendors and members, ensuring competitive pricing, quality products, and efficient procurement processes. The fees collected from vendors are often reinvested in the cooperative's operations, allowing it to continue providing value to its members and supporting their collective purchasing needs.
