= Handy Hardware =

Handy Hardware was a hardware store distribution center serving 1,000 retailers in 9 states in the United States, from Colorado to Florida, and in Mexico and Central America as well. It was founded in 1961 in Houston, Texas.

Handy Hardware is a member/owner of Distribution America, second largest wholesale marketing organization in the United States.

In 2013, Handy Hardware filed for Chapter 11 bankruptcy protection, listing assets and liabilities between $50 million and $100 million.

In 2016, Handy Hardware was purchased by Hardware Distribution Warehouses, Inc.

In early 2019, Handy Hardware and Hardware Distribution Warehouses, Inc. went out of business.
