= Jensen Distribution Services =

American hardware distributor

- Formerly: Jensen, Brooke & Company, Jensen King & Co, Jensen-King-Byrd (1895-1925), Jensen-Byrd Co (1925-1995),
- Predecessors: Wolverton and Byrd
- Founded: 1883; 142 years ago
- Founders: O.C. Jensen, Henry Brooke
- Defunct: 2015
- Fate: Purchased by Ace Hardware and integrated with Emery-Waterhouse into Ace Wholesale Holdings, LLC
- Successor: Emery-Jensen Distribution, LLC
- Headquarters: Spokane, Washington, United States

Jensen Distribution Services was a wholesale hardware distributor that serviced over 2,000 customers in 11 western states. Jensen Distribution Services carries over 52,000 items in departments including household hardware, hand and power tools, electrical, plumbing, paint and sundries, outdoor living, housewares, automotive, and lawn & garden products.

== History ==
O.C. Jensen and Henry Brooke founded Jensen, Brooke & Company, a hardware business, in 1883. Brooke later sold his interest in the company to Charles King and the business was renamed Jensen King & Co. in 1895. The company merged with Wolverton and Byrd and moved to Spokane where it incorporated under the name Jensen-King-Byrd. Jensen's sons, Alvin L. and J. Scott Jensen bought out King's interest in the company in 1925 and changed the name of the business to Jensen-Byrd Co.

Jensen-Byrd Co. acquired the Spokane branch of Marshall Wells in 1958 and Pacific Marine Schwabacher in 1981. In 1995, Jensen-Byrd Co. changed its name to Jensen Distribution Services.

In January 2015, the company was purchased by Ace Hardware, and it was promptly merged with Emery-Waterhouse to form Emery-Jensen Distribution, LLC, a division of Ace Wholesale Holdings, LLC, with operations relocated from Spokane, Washington to Ace's headquarters in Oak Brook, Illinois.
