= Retailer Owned Food Distributors & Associates =

Retailer co-operative

- Abbreviation: ROFDA
- Formation: 1962; 64 years ago
- Type: Industry association
- Region served: Southeastern United States
- Website: https://www.rofda.com/

Retailer Owned Food Distributors and Associates (known as ROFDA), in the spirit of co-opetition, is an organization of wholesale food distributors that are owned by their U.S. retail independent retail grocer members. There are three categories of relationships in ROFDA. In addition to the Members, there are a select number of Associates and Suppliers who provide ROFDA Members with goods and services. ROFDA operates as a cooperative.

ROFDA's focus is to create benefits for the independent retail grocer member-owners through sharing information; leveraging collective resources and developing tools to assist them in competing against big-box stores.

According to research commissioned by the National Grocers Association and its sponsors, the independent grocery channel makes up 1 percent of the U.S. economy.

== Categories of relationships ==
Retailer Owned Food Distributors and Associates recognizes three categories of relationships:

=== Regular members ===
This category is made up exclusively of Retailer Owned Food Distributors, defined as those primarily engaged in the wholesale distribution of food and related services in the United States, and having at least 66-2/3 percent of its issued and outstanding voting stock owned by active retail outlets.

=== Associates/suppliers ===
This category comprises firms that are regularly engaged in the supply of services or products to Regular Members.

=== Honorary members ===
Former members or associates who are not presently active in the food industry but permitted to retain an association with the organization in recognition of past service.

== History Timeline ==
Founded in 1962 by cooperative food distributors in the southeastern United States, the original organization's name was Southeastern Food Cooperative Association (SFCA). In the 1980s, the organization expanded geographically out of the southeast, and in 1988 the name of the organization changed to Retailer Owned Food Distributors and Associates. In 1996, the organization incorporated as a cooperative. Before that it had been a nonprofit association. In 2012, ROFDA commemorated their 50th anniversary.

Medallion Commemorating ROFDA's 50th Anniversary

== ROFDA's identity ==
In 2013, ROFDA began several initiatives. The first, to improve their industry identity, new Purpose Statement and Mission Statement were developed and refined to clarify the meaning and purpose of the organization.

=== Purpose statement ===
"A cooperative formed to facilitate and enhance the success of Independent Retail Grocers".

=== Mission statement ===
"Cooperatively united to utilize and leverage all available resources, industry best practices, and business relationships to provide added value to our Independent Retail Grocers".

=== Logo and tagline ===
As part of the identity initiative, the organization's logo was redesigned. This was accomplished through a collaborative effort between the members. The logo, designed by one of the member's marketing team, is a simple representation of the three important ROFDA relationships: Members, Associates and Suppliers. “Strength in Unity” was a tagline contributed by a different member's team.

== Conferences, share groups, and forums ==
Communication among members and affiliates is a critical part of the collaborative nature of the ROFDA cooperative.

=== Semiannual conferences ===
Although there are numerous opportunities for online and offline communication, ROFDA's semi-annual conferences provide the opportunity for ROFDA members, associates and other affiliated parties to engage in face-to-face communications. Their members believe there is enhanced value in building understanding and relationships through their conferences. ROFDA hosts one conference in the spring and one in the fall.

=== Website ===
ROFDA's website provides basic information and also provides a secure portal to allow Members, Associates and Suppliers access to directories, information and private online discussion boards.

== Members location map ==
- Associated Food Stores, Inc. – Salt Lake City, Utah
- Associated Grocers of New England, Inc. – Pembroke, New Hampshire
- Associated Grocers, Inc. – Baton Rouge, Louisiana
- Associated Wholesale Grocers – Kansas City, Kansas
- CERTCO, Inc. – Madison, Wisconsin
- Piggly Wiggly Alabama Distributing Co., Inc – Bessemer, Alabama
- U.R.M. Stores, Inc. – Spokane, Washington
