= Intres B.V. =

Dutch retail organisation

Coordinates: 52°10′9.86″N 5°27′23.43″E

Intres B.V. (International Retail Support) is a Dutch retail organisation, established in Hoevelaken. The company provides various services to owners of shops and is franchisor of such brands as Intersport, Livera and Libris.

== History ==
Intres B.V. is 100th in the list of Dutch companies in terms of income and number of employees for 2005 and 2006. In 2007, Intres had 1,237 members with 1,874 stores and organized the central payments for 2,419 companies. Intres is the largest retailers' cooperative in the Netherlands with a consumer income of €2.1 billion.

== Operations ==
The activities of Intres can be divided into four divisions: Fashion, Living, Intersport Netherlands and Media. These four components manage brands as Livera, First Lady, Lin-o-Lux, Garant Furniture, Intersport, Coach, Blz. and Libris. The members can benefit from group purchasing.

In addition to the brand companies, Intres has also central services such as retail payment and commercial services (marketing). Most groups of retailers within Intres are cooperating on the development of consumer websites.
