= Topco =

Largest American retail food GPO (Group Purchasing Organization)

Topco Associates LLC
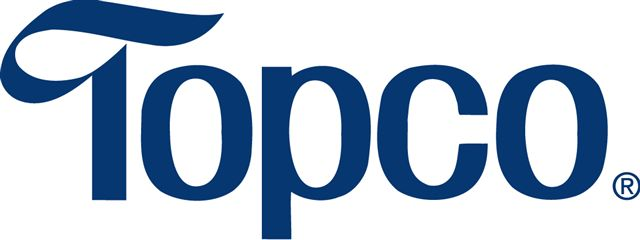
- Type: Private
- Industry: Retail
- Founded: September 28, 1944; 82 years ago
- Headquarters: Itasca, Illinois
- Area served: United States
- Key people: Randy Skoda (president & CEO)
- Products: Strategic Sourcing Services
- Website: www.topco.com

Topco Associates LLC is a privately held food cooperative in the U.S. and the seventh largest private company in Chicago (in 2025).

== History ==
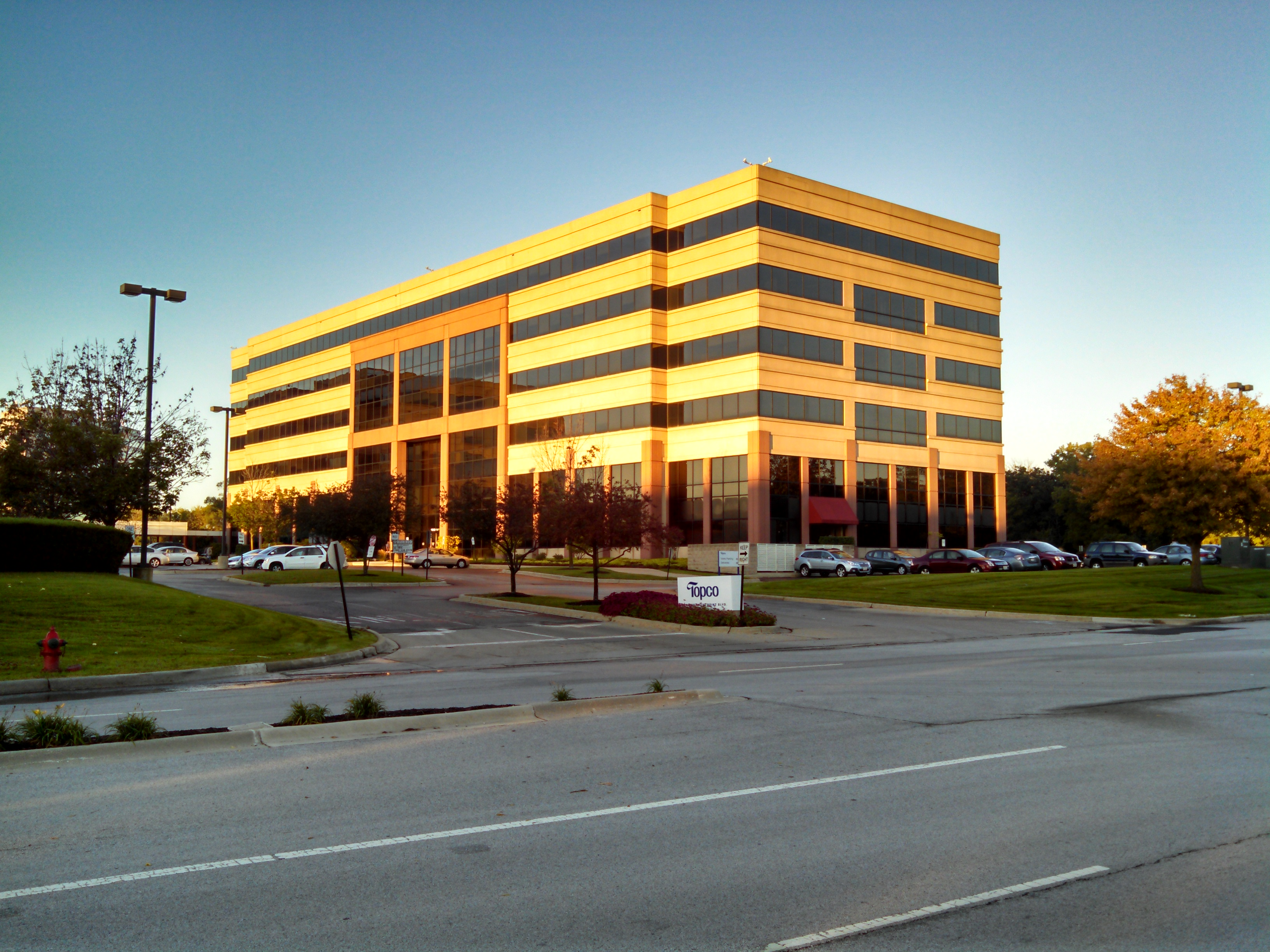
Former Topco headquarters in Elk Grove, Illinois

On September 28, 1944, to deal with wartime shortages, a small cooperative named Food Cooperatives, Inc., was formed by a group of Wisconsin food retailers to supply its members with private label dairy products and paper goods. The products procured by this organization were sold under the Food Club and Elna labels. Some of the members of Food Cooperatives were also members of another cooperative called Top Frost Foods.

In December 1950, the two cooperatives merged. This was the beginning of Topco Associates, Inc. Topco established its first fresh produce division in 1958, its first health and beauty and not-for-resale programs in 1960, and began exploring fresh beef opportunities in 1967. In 1979, Topco introduced its bakery procurement program, and introduced its first pharmacy program in 1999.

In 2001, Topco merged with Shurfine International to form Topco Associates LLC. Topco purchased competitor Western Family Foods in June 2016. On February 1, 2006, Topco announced the acquisition of BrainTree Sourcing from Ahold USA, forming a new company called TopSource LLC (as a wholly owned subsidiary of Topco Associates LLC), which is now known as Topco's Indirect Spend program. The Indirect Spend program currently operates out of Quincy, Massachusetts.
