= Associated Wholesale Grocers =

Cooperative wholesaler

Associated Wholesale Grocers, Inc.
- Company type: Private
- Industry: Grocery wholesale and distribution
- Founded: Kansas City, Missouri (1924)
- Headquarters: Kansas City, Kansas, United States
- Number of locations: over 4,000 locations in 36 states
- Area served: Midwest; Southeast; Southwest
- Products: Private label grocery brands
- Website: www.awginc.com

Associated Wholesale Grocers, Inc. (AWG) is a retailer-owned wholesale grocery cooperative that supplies independently owned supermarkets and grocery stores. It serves more than 4,000 locations in 36 states in the Midwest, the Southeast, and the Southwest, and from 8 full-line wholesale divisions. The consolidated run-rate sales for AWG is close to $10 billion. In addition to its cooperative wholesale operations, the company also operates subsidiary companies which provide certain real estate and supermarket development services, digital marketing services, and is a wholesale supply provider of health and beauty care, general merchandise, specialty/international foods and pharmaceutical supplies. It was founded in 1924 as Associated Grocers of Kansas City and was based in Kansas City, Missouri before moving to Kansas City, Kansas. Associated Wholesale Grocers distributes four private-label brands of grocery products, Best Choice, Clearly Organic, Always Save, and Superior Selections along with IGA.

== History ==
AWG's history dates back to 1924 when a group of 20 independent grocers met for the first time to discuss the advantages of combining their buying and advertising power. Competition was fierce in those days with national chains dominating the grocery scene. Independents struggled to compete, and a cooperative effort was viewed as the only way in which to gain market strength. For two years, the group bought collectively and stored their wares in the back of a store owned by J.C. Harline at 39th and Troost in Kansas City, Missouri.

In March 1926, Articles of Incorporation were filed. The company's first official warehouse was located in the second floor of the Morehead Grocery Company, at 3842 Troost.

In 1953, the company name was changed to Associated Wholesale Grocers, Inc., (AWG) and the following year, AWG paid its first year-end patronage of $20,441 to members. Prior to 1954, members had received dividends on their stock, usually from .50-.75 per share.

By the end of the 1960s, AWG had two new warehouses including one in Springfield. In 2010 a 50,000 square foot facility was built to replace one destroyed by fire, and in Kansas City the long-awaited 565,000 square foot office and warehouse complex was ready for occupancy in 2015.

In the late 1980s AWG members bought 40 Food Barn stores and 29 Homeland stores, and the former Homeland warehouse in Oklahoma City became AWG's third division. Valu Merchandisers, AWG's wholly owned subsidiary supplying health and beauty care products and general merchandise, came on line offering a selection of more than 12,000 items from its 219,000 square foot facility in Fort Scott, Kansas.

In 2003, AWG expanded into the southeastern United States with the acquisition of two grocery distribution centers: a 737,000 square foot facility in Goodlettsville, Tennessee and a 675,000 square foot warehouse in Southaven, Mississippi. The 2003 acquisition also included a distribution center in Memphis, Tennessee now operated by AWG's Valu Merchandisers (VMC) subsidiary. VMC supplies general merchandise and specialty foods to its customers from their Memphis facility and health and beauty products from its Fort Scott, Kansas warehouse.

In 2007, AWG acquired a distribution center from Albertsons in Fort Worth, Texas. This facility served members in Texas, New Mexico, and Louisiana. Also in 2007, AWG built a new distribution center in Oklahoma City, Oklahoma. AWG built the 800,000 square foot facility to serve Oklahoma, northern Texas, and southern Kansas.

In 2011, AWG broke ground on a division in Pearl River, Louisiana. This Gulf Coast Division serves independent retailers in Louisiana, Texas, Mississippi, Alabama, Georgia, and Florida.

In 2012, AWG completed a 30,000 square foot expansion of its headquarters in Kansas City, KS. The newly expanded complex houses over one-thousand employees, including the AWG corporate office and the Kansas City distribution center, as well as 100 employees from Valu Merchandisers Company, a wholly owned subsidiary formerly located in Kansas City, Missouri. AWG's Gulf Coast division, located in Pearl River, Louisiana, began shipping product on January 20, 2013.

In 2016, AWG reached an agreement to acquire certain assets of Affiliated Foods Midwest (AFM). AFM, a like-minded retailer-owned cooperative, supplied members that operated more than 800 stores in 15 states.

In 2017, AWG began distributing their line of groceries to the Highland, Indiana-based Strack & Van Til food stores.

In 2017, AWG announced they would sell their 200-employee, Fort Worth, Texas division.

In 2020, AWG announced plans to open distribution hubs in Memphis, Tennessee and Hernando, Mississippi.

== Store concepts ==
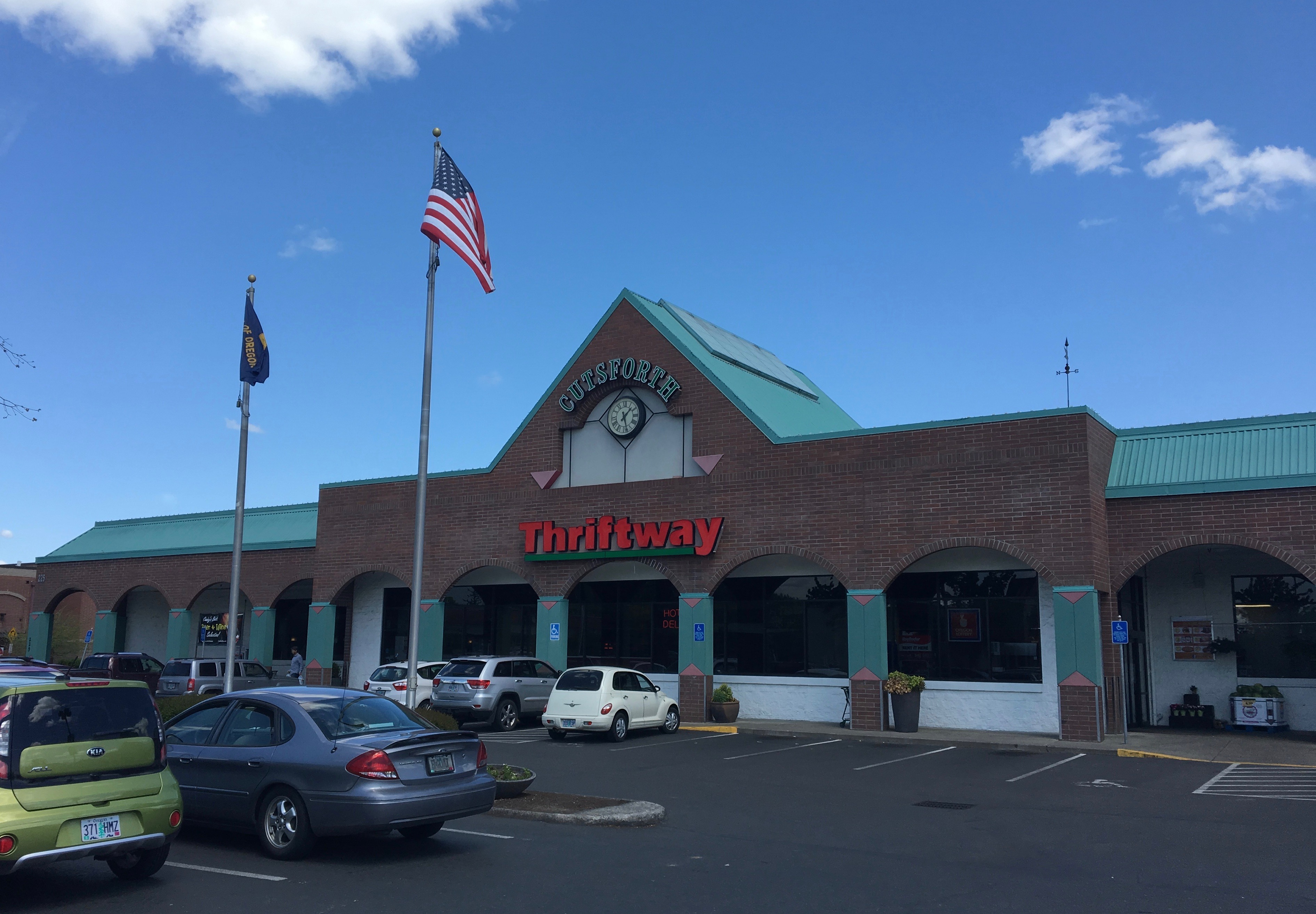
Thriftway store in Canby, Oregon

- Apple Market
- Cash Saver
- Country Mart
- Food Rite
- IGA
- Price Chopper
- Sun Fresh
- ThriftWay

== Selected members ==
- Four B (Ball's Food Stores and Hen House Market)
- Apple Markets of St. Joseph
- Cosentino's
- Queen's Price Chopper
- Harps Food Stores
- Homeland
- Houchens Industries
- Market Basket
- Ramey’s Marketplace
- Ray's Apple Markets
- Reasor's
- Rouse's
- RPCS Inc.
- Superlo Foods
- Thriftway Stores. (Kansas City, MO)
- B&R Stores (Super Saver and Russ's Markets)
- Gray's Finer Foods (Rockford, Illinois)
- GES, Inc. (Edwards Food Giant and Edwards Cash Saver)
- Mckeever's Price Chopper
- County Fresh (Cash Saver 417, Cash Saver 870, Porter's).
- Eastport Market (Eastport, Michigan)
