= True Value =

American wholesaler

True Value Company, L.L.C.
- Trade name: True Value
- Type: Subsidiary
- Industry: Hardware stores
- Founded: Chicago, Illinois, U.S. (1948; 78 years ago, as Cotter & Company)
- Founder: John Cotter
- Headquarters: Chicago, Illinois, U.S.
- Number of locations: 4,500+ (60 countries)
- Key people: Dan Starr (CEO)
- Products: Home improvement products; Home appliances; tools; household hardware; lumber; building materials; paint; plumbing; equipment rental
- Revenue: ▼US$1.488 billion (2017)
- Operating income: ▲US$ 40.16 million (2017)
- Net income: ▲US$ 24.75 million (2017)
- Total assets: ▼US$ 912.88 million (2017)
- Total equity: ▼US$ 160.4 million (2017)
- Number of employees: 2,500 (2019)
- Website: truevalue.com

The True Value Company is an American wholesaler and hardware store brand. The corporate headquarters are located in Chicago.

Historically, True Value was a cooperative owned by retailers until 2018, when it was purchased by ACON Investments. In October 2024, True Value filed for bankruptcy and competitor Do It Best agreed to purchase the company.

== History ==
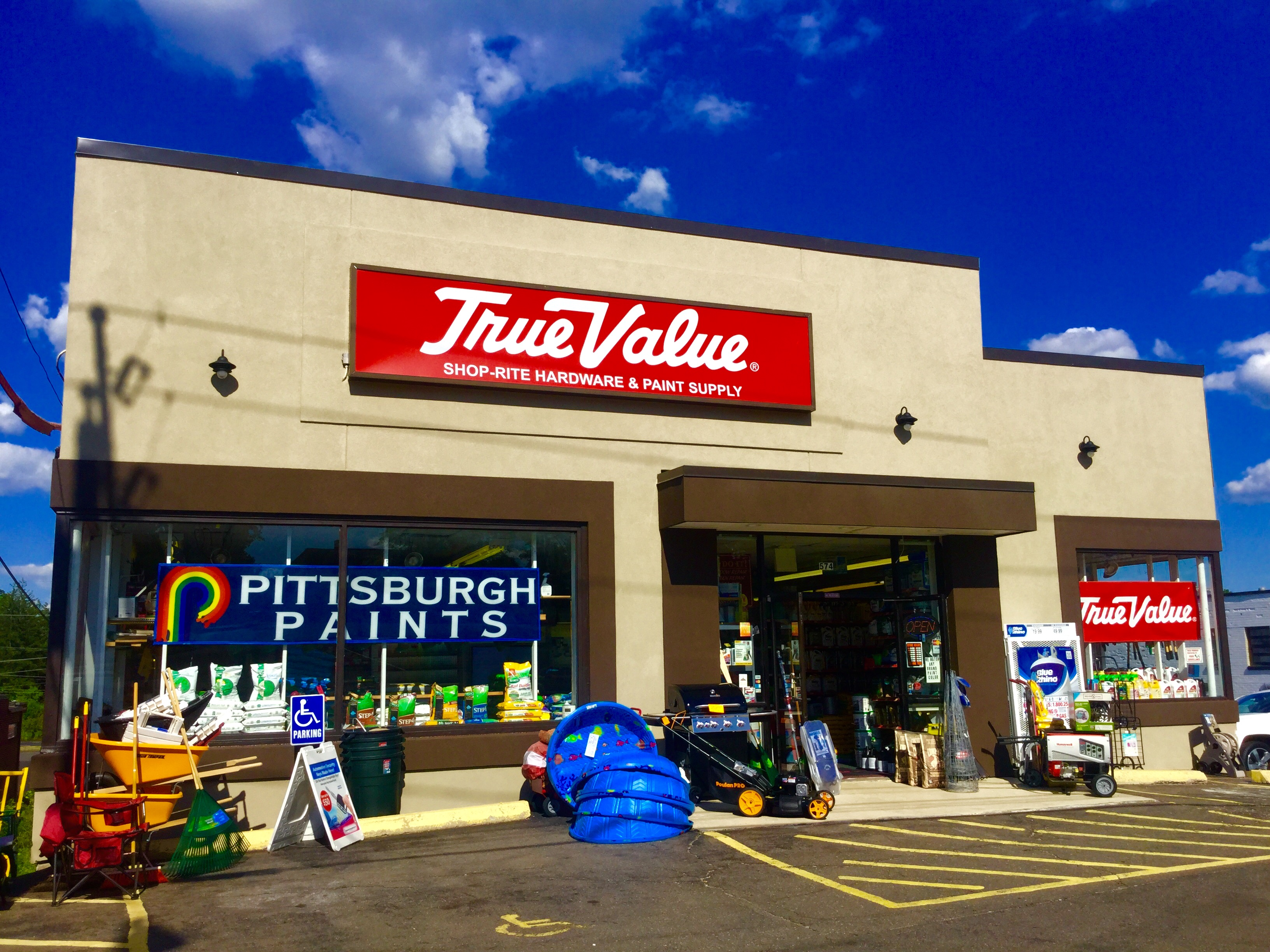
A True Value outlet in Wethersfield, Connecticut

=== Origins ===
True Value Company traces its history back to four entities: Hibbard Spencer Bartlett & Company (formed in 1855); American Hardware & Supply (formed in 1910); Coast to Coast Corporation (formed in 1928); Cotter & Company (formed in 1948).

Hibbard introduced the True Value name in 1932 for a line of hand tools. In 1940, the company began opening several test stores under the name. In 1953, the True Value program was introduced. By 1957, Hibbard had closed its small accounts and concentrated solely on its True Value program. During this time, the company began buying up smaller wholesalers. By 1960, it had nearly 1,000 dealers from Denver to Appalachia, with distribution centers in Evanston, St. Louis, Auburn, and Detroit.

However, by 1962, the company had transitioned away from the hardware business in order to focus exclusively on real estate. Cotter & Company, a cooperative formed in 1948, acquired the company's assets for US$2.5 million, paying $2,500 for the True Value trademark. Cotter retained 400 of Hibbard's 900 True Value dealers and Cotter's own Value & Service branding was slowly phased out.

From there, Cotter also acquired the Dallas-based Walter H. Allen Co. in 1964, Tyron-Suppl-Biddle in Philadelphia in 1965, Los Angeles-based Great Western Hardware in 1968, Northern Hardware of the Pacific Northwest in 1970, and Van Camp Hardware of Indianapolis in 1976. These moves gave the company 3,687 True Value members in all 50 states. Cotter also introduced its V & S Variety concept during this time. By 1986, it also had 14 distribution centers around the country.

In 1977, American Hardware introduced its ServiStar advertising program. By 1983, it had 2,100 owner-dealers in the program, which accounted for 70% of sales. In recognition of its increased importance, American became the ServiStar Corporation in 1988. In 1990, the company introduced its Home & Garden Showplace concept. That July, it acquired Coast to Coast out of bankruptcy for $25 million and merged the two companies to form a $1.8 billion international co-op.

In 1993, ServiStar Coast to Coast acquired 228 Taylor Rental franchises from The Stanley Works. Together with its 260 Grand Rental Station stores, it became the largest general rental chain in the US. Cotter established True Value International in 1994, which served stores outside the United States.

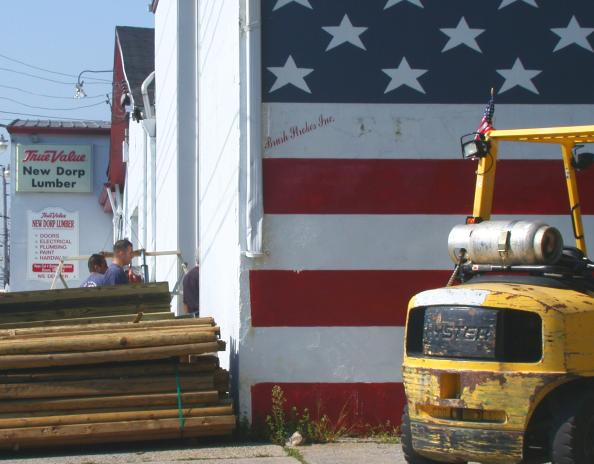
A worker enters a True Value lumberyard in New Dorp, Staten Island, New York City, New York. The lumberyard shut down in 2009.

=== TruServ Corporation ===
In 1997, Cotter & Company and ServiStar Coast to Coast Corporation merged to form TruServ Corporation. The new Chicago-based company had $4.5 billion in sales and 10,500 stores, making it the largest wholesaler in the industry, surpassing rival Ace Hardware. The new company continued to do business under the True Value, ServiStar, Coast to Coast, Grand Rental Station, Taylor Rental, Home & Garden Showplace, and Induserve Supply names.

The new co-op struggled as it attempted to manage multiple brands, inventory, and operations. In 2000, accounting irregularities of about $100 million were discovered, leading to a $131 million loss for the fiscal year of 1999. This caused the value of TruServ's stock to plummet, a pause in dividend payments, and a freeze on stock sales. Additional problems were found, forcing TruServe to restate its financials from 1997 to 1999. By 2001, the company had defaulted on $200 million in revolving debt, 2,100 members had left the cooperative, and several had filed lawsuits against the company. In 2002, the company was investigated by the SEC. TruServ Corporation brought in new management, revamped the board of directors, eliminated the ServiStar and Coast to Coast brand names, negotiated a new line of credit, and streamlined operations by closing many of the regional distribution centers.

TruServ Canada separated from the US-based cooperative in 2001. In 2002, TruServ sold seven distribution centers to third parties and agreed to lease them back for 20 years.

=== True Value Company ===
In 2005, the company was renamed True Value Company. The Taylor Rental, Grand Rental Station, Home & Garden Showplace, and Induserve Supply names were retained. At this point, it was ranked behind Ace Hardware and Do It Best in terms of sales. By 2006, it had 6,000 stores.

In July 2017, it was reported that True Value was looking for a buyer. At the time, competitor Ace Hardware expressed interest in purchasing it. In March 2018, ACON Investments, a private equity firm, purchased a controlling 70% of True Value. In April, a majority of the co-op's shareholders voted to approve the deal. As a result, it would no longer operate as a cooperative moving forward.

In 2019, True Value opened a new 1.4 million square foot facility in Wilkes-Barre, Pennsylvania to service approximately 1,000 stores. Along with the new distribution center True Value also adopted the "hub-and-spoke" model.

On November 1, 2022, True Value acquired the Agway Trademark from Agway Farm & Home Supply. At the time, nearly 600 stores used the Agway name. By 2023, True Value had 13 regional distribution centers, with about 2,500 associates serving more than 4,500 stores in 60 countries.

In July 2024, True Value announced the closure of its Manchester, New Hampshire regional distribution center by the end of the year. The distribution center in Denver would also stop servicing retailers in November.

=== Sale Do It Best ===
On October 14, 2024, True Value filed for Chapter 11 bankruptcy protection as it continued to face liquidity challenges caused by inflation and rising interest rates. The company ultimately agreed to sell itself to competitor Do It Best for $153 million, returning True Value to a cooperative structure. The purchase was completed in November 2024.

== Private brands ==
True Value offers a number of private brands that are sold exclusively at its member stores. These include Green Thumb (gardening), Master Electrician (electrical supplies), Master Plumber (plumbing supplies), HomePointe (cleaning supplies and bath fixtures), Master Painter (painting supplies), Tru Guard (electrical safety goods and lock sets), Pet Expert (collars and pet kennels), Holiday Wonderland (holiday decor), Master Mechanic (tools), TVX (budget).

The company introduced the Tru-Test paint brand in 1963. It was later supplanted by EasyCare, which is manufactured at True Value's General Paint & Manufacturing (GPM) factory in Cary, Illinois. This facility manufactures latex paints, oil-based paints, stains and aerosols exceeding 7,300,000 gallons annually for multiple retailers in addition to True Value.

In 1971, the company began manufacturing its own lawn mowers out of a factory in Illinois. The line was renamed Lawn Chief in 1975. The operation also began producing wheelbarrows, snow shovels, and electric heaters. When Atlas Tool Company was purchased in 1983, tillers and snow throwers were added to the line.

In 1983, True Value introduced its Green Thumb lawn care line.

In March 2022, the company acquired Yenkin-Majestic's Majic line of consumer paints. In March 2023, it also acquired the Shur-Line brand of painting supplies and WordLock line of security products.
