= Western Family Foods =

Private company based in the US

- Formerly: Pacific Mercantile Cooperative
- Type: Private
- Industry: Private Label
- Founded: March 3, 1934; 92 years ago
- Defunct: 2016
- Fate: Acquired by Topco
- Successor: Food Club
- Headquarters: Tigard, Oregon, U.S.
- Key people: Ron King, CEO
- Revenue: $730M (2014)
- Number of employees: 72 (2012)
- Website: www.westernfamily.com

Western Family Foods was founded as the Pacific Mercantile Cooperative on March 3, 1934, by a group of retailer-owned grocery wholesalers. Western Family Foods was established December 19, 1963. The company supplied independent grocery stores with store brands. It is based in Tigard, Oregon. It used to distribute the Western Family, Shurfine, Shursaving, MarketChoice, and Better Buy brands, which were used in many independently owned supermarkets. On June 13, 2016, Western Family Foods announced that they had been acquired by Topco and closed their Tigard office later in 2016.
