= Retailers' cooperative =

Type of cooperative

A retailers' cooperative is a type of cooperative which employs economies of scale on behalf of its retailer members. Retailers' cooperatives use their purchasing power to acquire discounts from manufacturers and often share marketing expenses. A retailers' cooperative is essentially a group of independently owned businesses that pool their resources to purchase in bulk, usually by establishing a central buying organization, and engage in joint promotion efforts. It is common for locally owned grocery stores, hardware stores, and pharmacies to participate in retailers' cooperatives.

Both consumers' cooperatives and workers' cooperatives should be distinguished from a retailers' cooperative.

== Governance and operation ==
Retailers' cooperatives are governed by democratic member control, which generally means one vote per member. Some firms, such as E. Leclerc, are able to make decisions in this fashion, with each member business only receiving one vote. For many retailer co-ops, however, it is difficult to achieve a democratic standard. Since the members are businesses rather than individuals, offering one vote per member will leave the larger member businesses underrepresented. If the number of votes is based on the size of the business, there is a risk of all smaller businesses within the cooperative being outvoted by a larger business. A democratic solution that many retailers' cooperatives employ is an increase in votes based on business size, up to a certain point, say 5 or 10 votes. This way, the degree of representation for member businesses varies.

== Financing and economic goals ==
In order to lower costs, retailers' cooperatives establish central buying locations, providing them with the opportunity to purchase in bulk. Retailers' cooperatives also engage in group advertising and promotion, uniform stock merchandising, and private branding. This increases consumer recognition of brands and is beneficial for the stores under a franchise.

The aim of the cooperative is to improve buying conditions for its members, which are retail businesses in this case. The incentive to remain in the cooperative is largely due to the profits that members gain. Generally, any surpluses are shared by the members in accordance with their original input.

== Examples ==
Examples of retailer's cooperatives include the following:

- Australia and New Zealand
  - Mitre 10
  - Foodstuffs
- Canada
  - Federated Co-operatives
  - Home Hardware
- United States
  - Ace Hardware
  - Do It Best
  - Frontier Co-Op
  - True Value (until 2018, now privately owned)
  - Best Western (until 1985, now a franchisor)
  - ShopRite
  - National Automotive Parts Association (NAPA)
- France
  - E.Leclerc
  - Les Mousquetaires
  - Système U
- Germany
  - Edeka
  - REWE Group
- Italy
  - Conad
- United Kingdom
  - Nisa
  - Edinburgh Bicycle Cooperative

== See also ==
- List of retailers' cooperatives
- Purchasing cooperative
- Consumers' cooperative
- Workers' cooperative
- Cooperative
