= List of Washington companies =

The following list of Washington companies includes notable companies that are, or once were, headquartered in the U.S. state of Washington.

== Companies based in Washington ==
=== A ===
- Alaska Airlines
- Amazon
- ArenaNet
- Audiosocket
- Avast! Recording Company
- Avista

=== B ===
- Banfield Pet Hospital
- Banner Bank
- Bartell Drugs
- Big Fish Games
- Books4cars
- Burgerville
- Blue Origin

=== C ===
- Chateau Ste. Michelle
- Costco

=== D ===
- Darigold
- Dick's Drive-In

=== E ===
- Expedia Group
- Expeditors International
- ExtraHop Networks

=== F ===
- Focus Designs
- Funko
- Filson

=== G ===
- Getty Images
- GiftTree

=== H ===
- Haggen
- Hi-School Pharmacy
- HomeStreet Bank
- Horizon Air

=== I ===
- I Can Has Cheezburger?
- Innersloth
- Itron
- Ivar's

=== J ===
- John L. Scott
- Jones Soda

=== K ===
- Kitsap Bank

=== L ===
- Liberty Orchards
- LiquidPlanner
- LMN Architects
- Lollar Pickups

=== M ===
- Microsoft
- MOD Pizza
- MTR Western

=== N ===
- Nautilus, Inc.
- Nintendo of America
- Nordstrom

=== P ===
- PACCAR
- Pacific Research Laboratories
- Papa Murphy's
- PCC Community Markets
- PeaceHealth
- Planetary Resources
- Premera Blue Cross

=== Q ===
- QFC
- Qualtrics

=== R ===
- Rainier Mountaineering
- Red Canoe Credit Union
- Redfin
- Recreational Equipment, Inc.
- Rosauers Supermarkets
- Russell Investments

=== S ===
- SAFE Boats International
- Savers
- The Seattle Times Company
- Seattle's Best Coffee
- Simpson Investment Company
- Slalom Consulting
- Starbucks
- Stemilt Growers
- Symetra

=== T ===
- Tableau Software
- Talking Rain
- Taylor Shellfish Company
- Tim's Cascade Snacks
- T-Mobile US
- Tommy Bahama
- Trident Seafoods
- Tully's Coffee

=== U ===
- Uwajimaya

=== V ===
- Valve

=== W ===
- WaFd Bank
- Walk Score
- Washington Trust Bank
- Weyerhaeuser
- WhitePages
- Windermere Real Estate

=== Y ===
- Yoke's Fresh Market

=== Z ===
- Zillow
- Zumiez
- ZymoGenetics

== Companies formerly based in Washington ==
=== 0-9 ===
- 43 Things

=== B ===
- Boeing
- Branded Entertainment Network

=== E ===
- EMC Isilon

=== G ===
- Group Health Cooperative

=== J ===
- JanSport

=== K ===
- Kaiser Aluminum
- Kaiser Permanente

=== Q ===
- Qliance

=== U ===
- UPS

=== R ===
- Red Robin

=== T ===
- Terra Bite Lounge
