= Esch =

Esch may refer to:

- Esch (surname)
- Esch-sur-Alzette, the second largest city in Luxembourg
- Esch-sur-Sûre, a village in Luxembourg
- Esch, Bernkastel-Wittlich, a municipality in the district Bernkastel-Wittlich, Rhineland-Palatinate, Germany
- Esch, Vulkaneifel, a municipality in the district Vulkaneifel, Rhineland-Palatinate, Germany
- Esch, Netherlands, a former municipality now part of the municipality of Haaren
- ESCH, NASDAQ symbol for Eschelon Telecom, Inc.
