= Greg Green =

American businessman

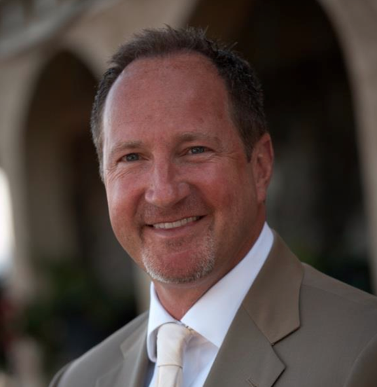
- Green in 2013
- Born: Kellogg, Idaho
- Occupations: Businessman and entrepreneur
- Known for: Telecommunications companies
- Title: Founder, CEO of Fatbeam, LLC
- Board member of: INCOMPAS

Greg Green is a businessman and entrepreneur based in the Spokane-area, who began his career in the telecommunications industry in the mid-1980s. He is the founder of Tel-West.

== Telecommunications industry beginnings ==
Green began his technology industry ventures when he formed Tel-West, a telecommunications provider of telecommunications services (a competitive access provider), in 1984. In 1995, Tel-West was acquired by NEXTLINK, an organization owned by Craig McCaw. Green was an early pioneer of competitive local exchange carriers, or CLECs, after the Telecommunications Act of 1996. As President of NEXTLINK Washington, which later became Communications, Green was a member of the senior management team that took NEXTLINK public and raising $400 million in 1997.

After spending three more years with NEXTLINK, Green left in 1998 to found a new company, OneEighty Communications. OneEighty Communications was founded in an effort to bring telecom services to underserved markets with populations of less than 500,000. Avista Corporation saw the value in it and purchased a majority share 6 months after Green founded the company. It was later renamed Avista Communications. Green remained with Avista Communications as its president and CEO until Avista Corp decided to sell the telecom section of its company in 2001.

He continued his work in the telecom industry by purchasing CLEC assets in the Northwest from Avista Communications. Those were later sold to Eschelon Telecom now a part of Integra Telecom.

== Later ventures ==
In 2010, Green partnered with Shawn Swanby, founder and President of Ednetics (a provider of technology solutions to the education community), to create a company, Fatbeam, that would deliver high capacity fiber optic transport services to underserved markets in the education, healthcare, and government markets.

In 10 years, as the President of Fatbeam, Green has grown the company's fiber networks throughout the Pacific Northwest and into Arizona and New Mexico servicing over 40 markets.

In 2015 and 2016, Green was acknowledged in Inland Business Catalyst Power 50 as one of the top fifty most influential individuals within the community.

In September 2015, Fatbeam earned the #190 spot on the 2015 Inc. 5000 list.

In 2017, Green was selected to serve on the INCOMPAS Board of Directors. INCOMPAS is a national association that advocates for a free and competitive communications marketplace.

In May 2019, Green was asked to speak at Eastern Washington University's SOAR Career Conference. His opening address was entitled, "Entrepreneurship and Effective Leadership in 2019".

In January 2020, Green's telecommunications company, Fatbeam, received a $36 million investment from New York-based private investment company, SDC Capital Partners LLC.

In March 2020, Green pledged Fatbeam's support of the FCC's "Keep Americans Connected" pledge as a response to the COVID-19 Coronavirus Crisis.

By the end of March 2020, Green's telecommunications company, Fatbeam, formally joined a partner network in collaboration with Blackfoot.

== Advocacy ==
In March 2019, Green advocated for Net Neutrality during a hearing of the House Committee on Energy and Commerce. During the hearing Green stated that, “In a lot of marketplaces, 70 percent of consumers only have one choice for their ISP,” he said. “We don’t believe that’s open access. People need competition, they need a landscape they can count on and investment in their own community.”

== Philanthropy ==
In the early 1990s, Green founded the Greg Green Foundation. The aim of this organization has been to aid communities and students in times of financial need. Over $600,000 has been donated since the foundation has started.

In 2017, Green donated $1,000 through his foundation to support the creation of the Bunker Hill Mine Museum.

In 2019, Green donated a $1,000 scholarship to NIC students in honor of local softball player, Toni Edinger.
