= List of South Australian commercial icons =

There have been many Adelaide and South Australian icons, some of which still exist, but few of which are still South Australian owned.

With the start of the 21st century, and in conjunction with the National Trust (SA), BankSA launched its annual "Heritage Icons List", naming 8 icons per year.

== List ==
- Balfours - owned by San Remo Macaroni Company since 2008
  - Balfours Frog cakes
- South Australian Brewing Company, purchased by Lion Nathan, now a subsidiary of Kirin
  - West End, West End Draught and Southwark Bitter.
  - The Brewery Chimney at Thebarton
  - The Christmas display on the south bank of the River Torrens at Thebarton.

== Gallery ==
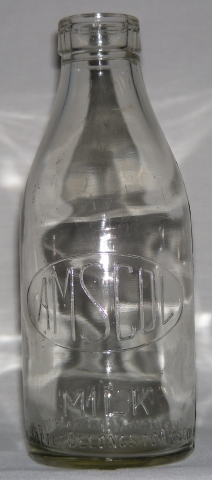
AMSCOL milk bottle c.1960

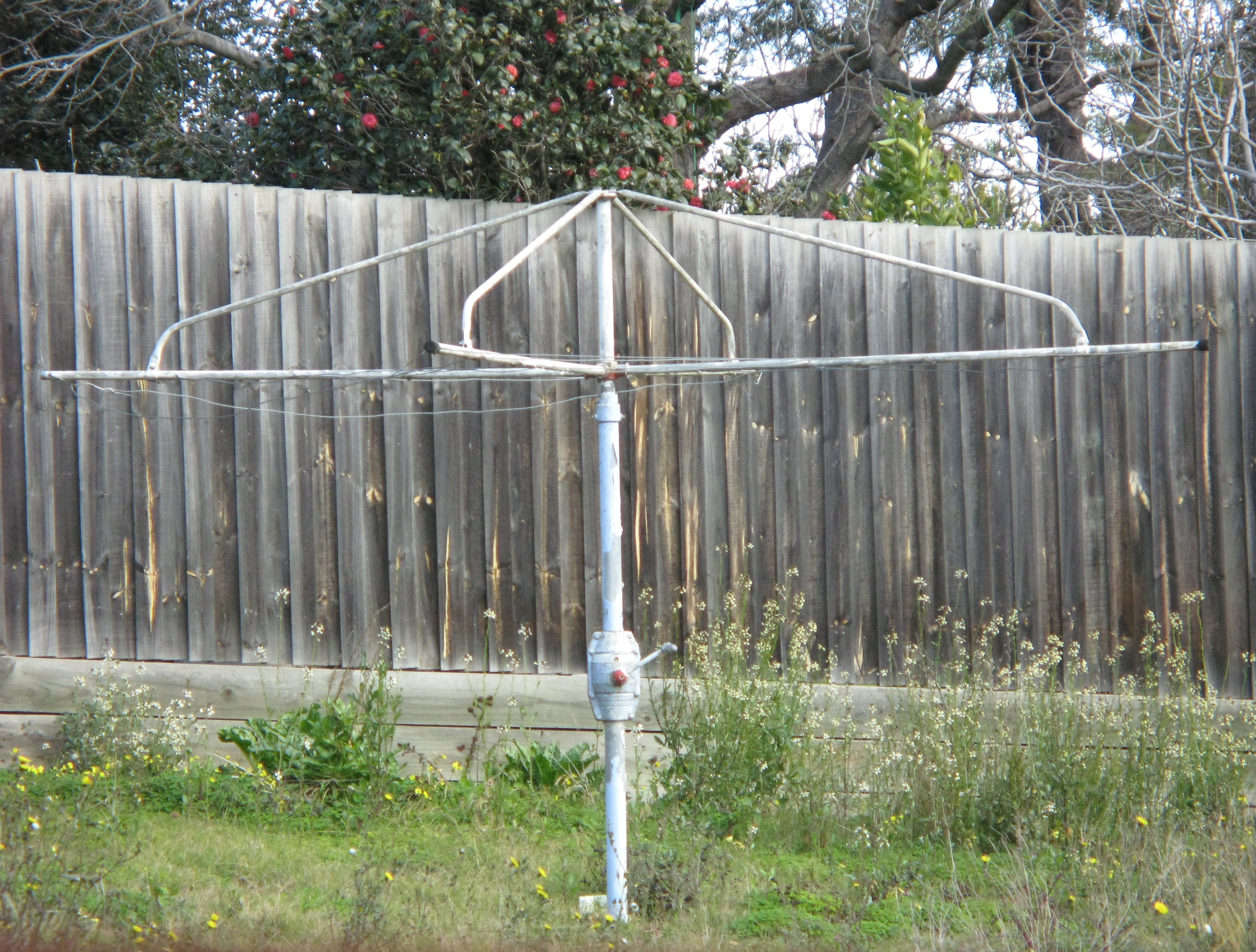
Hills Hoist

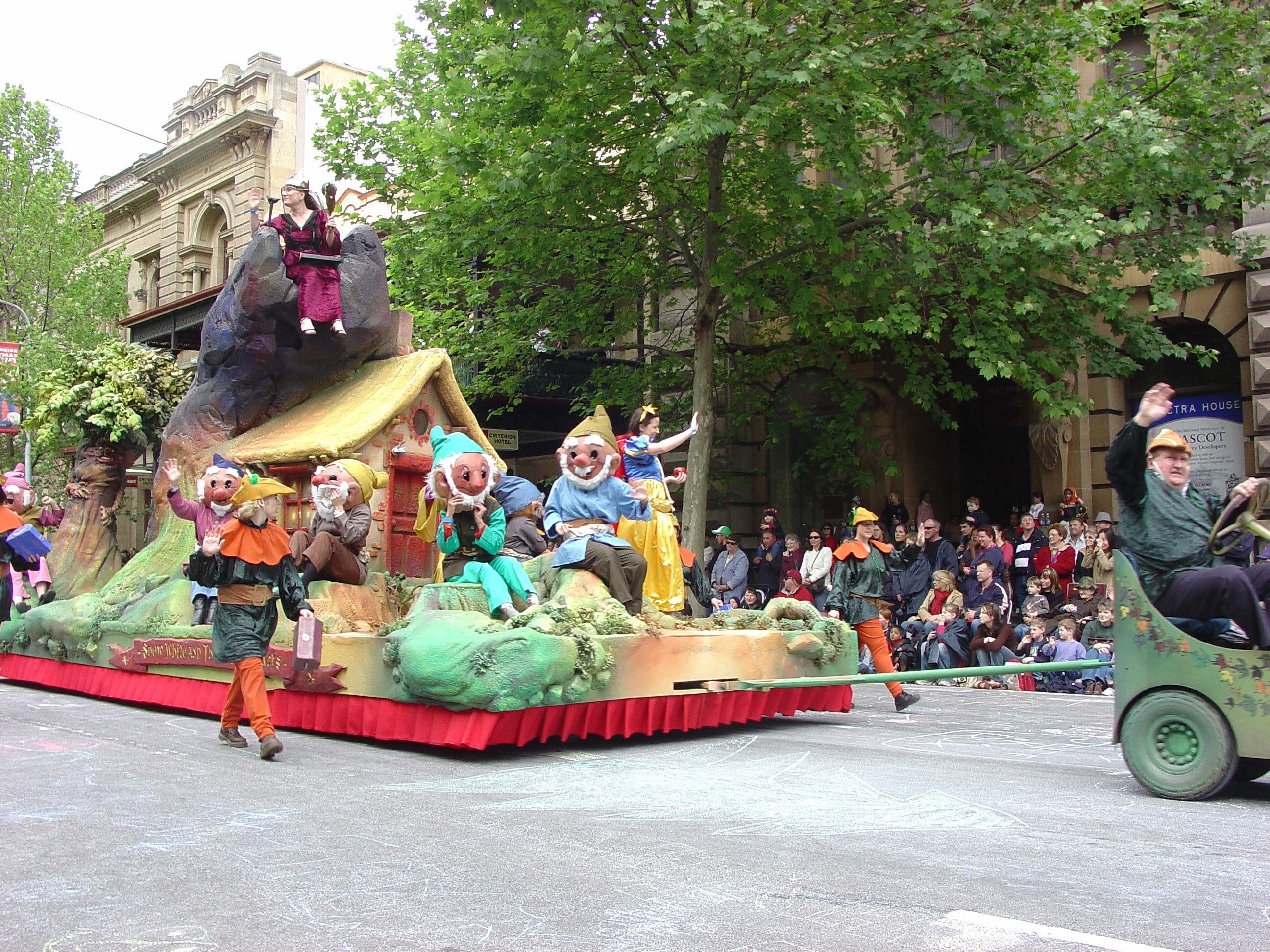
The Christmas Pageant

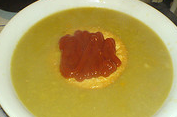
Pie floater with sauce

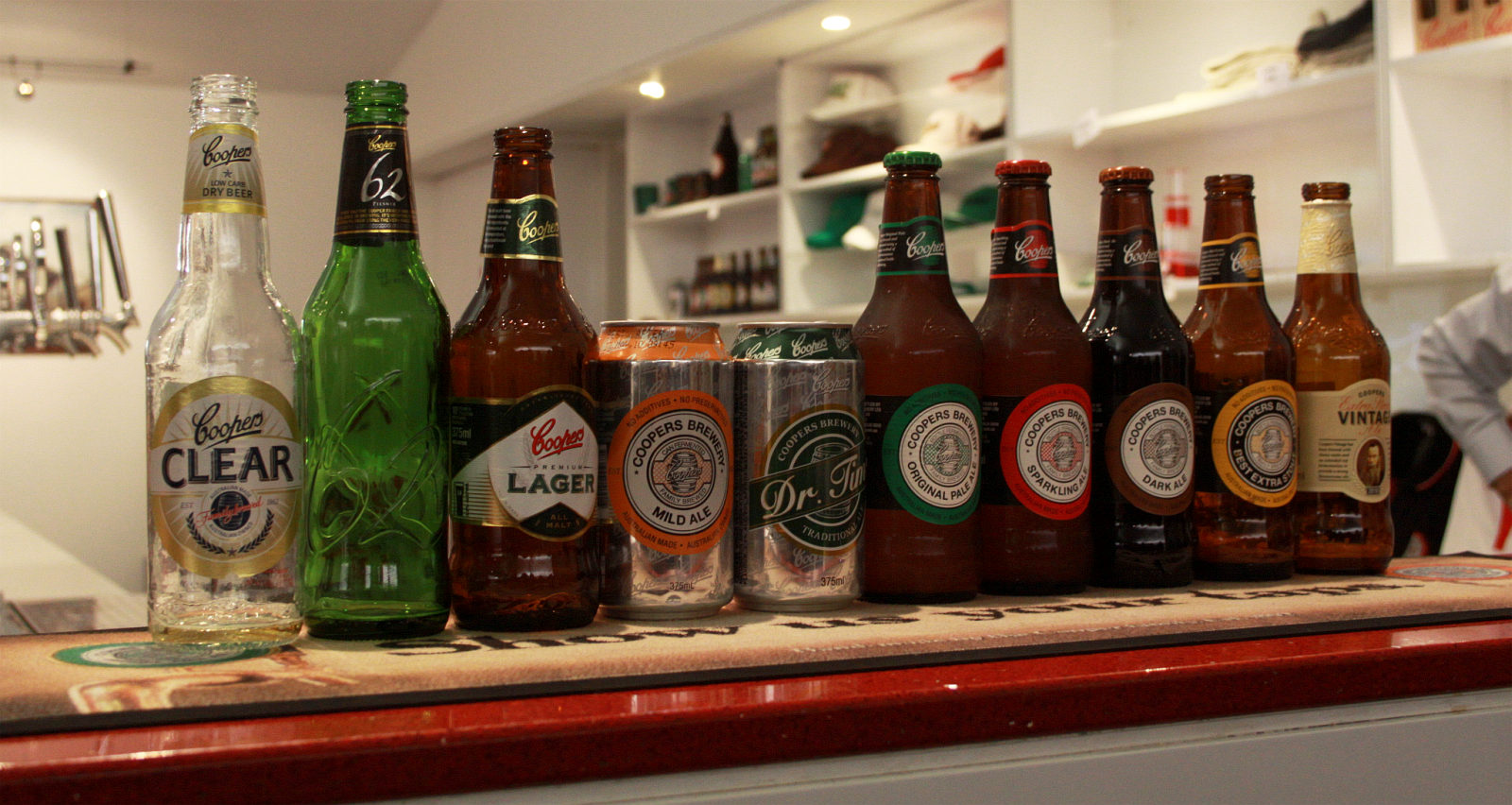
Coopers beers

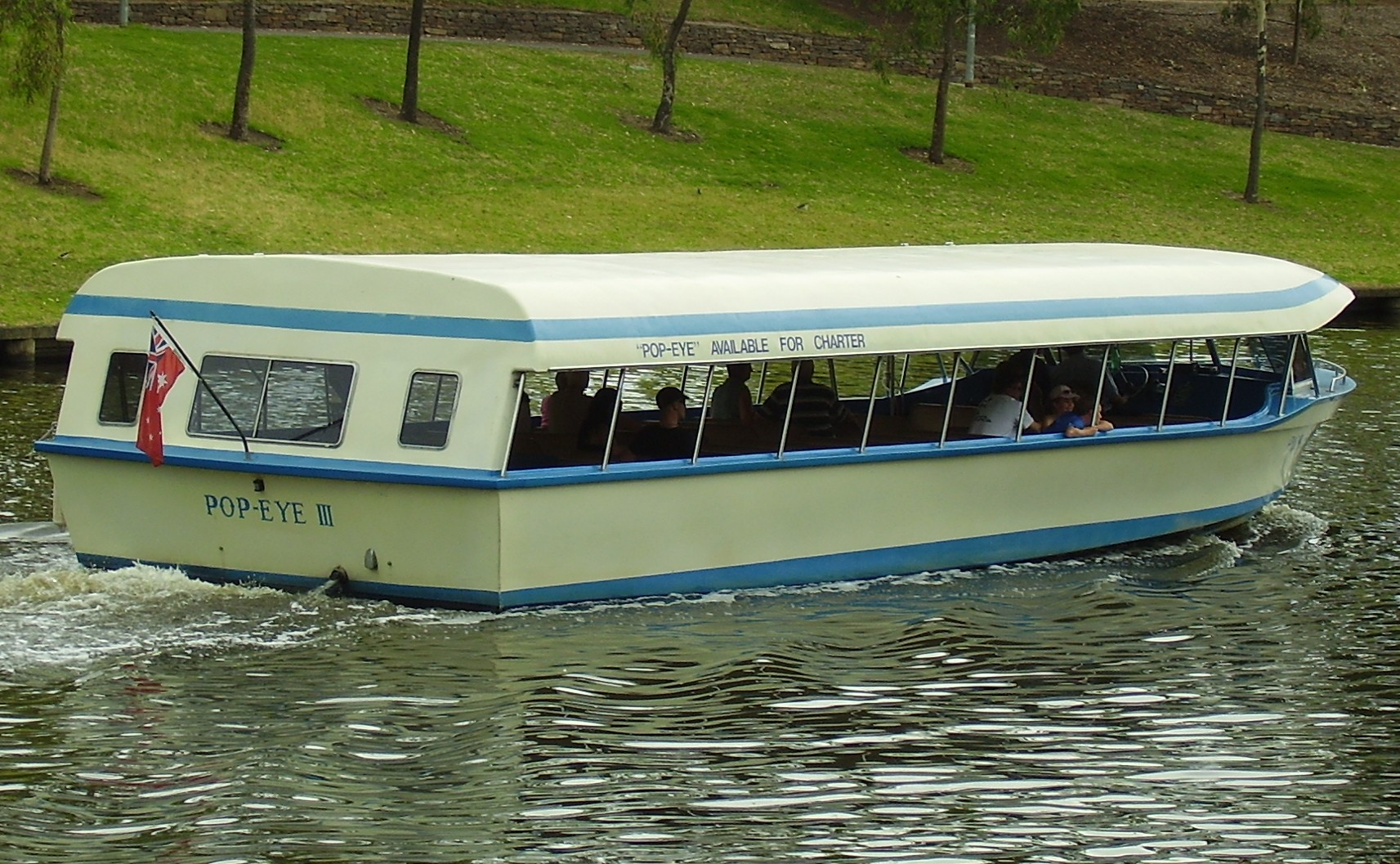
Popeye

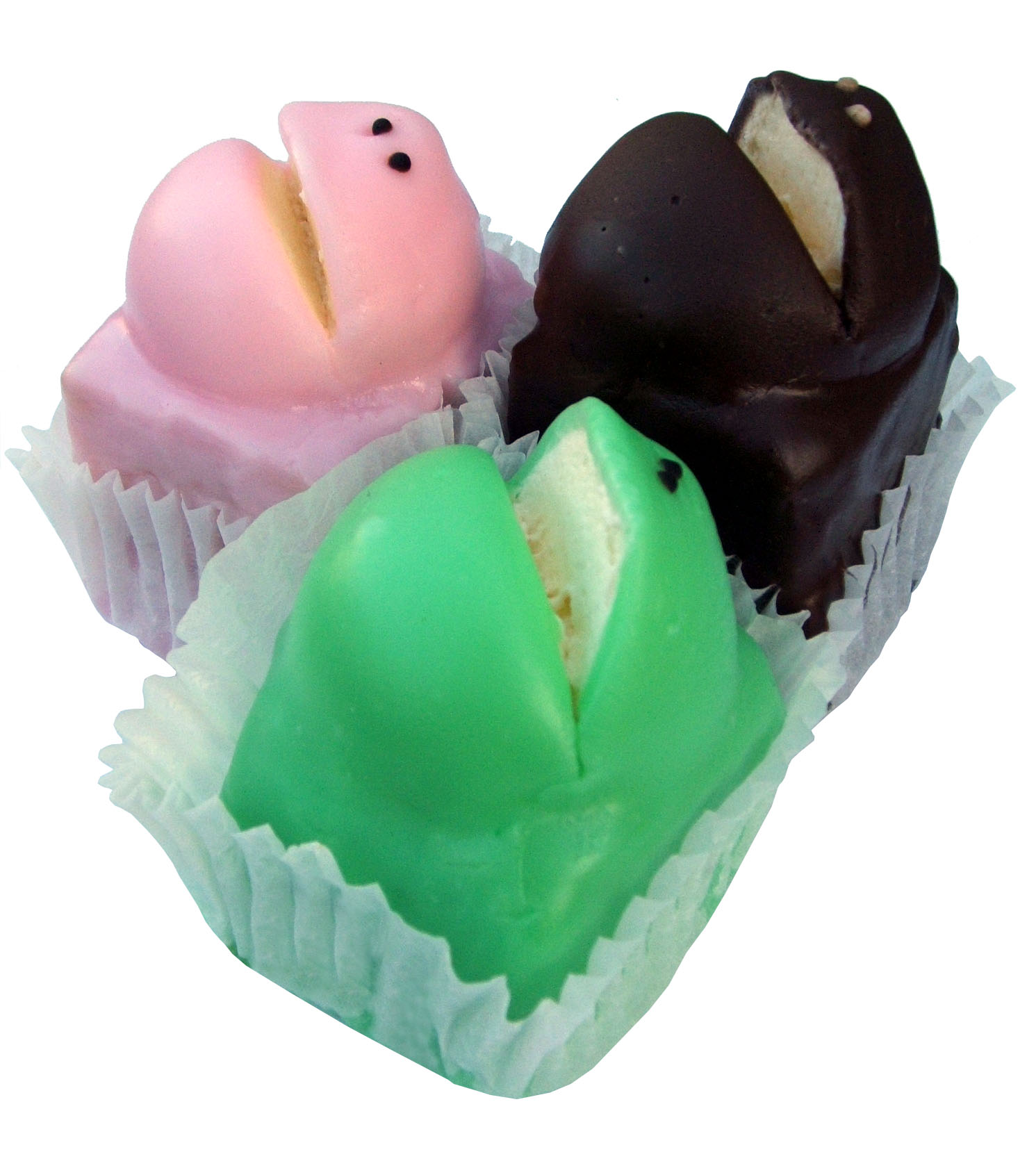
Frog cakes

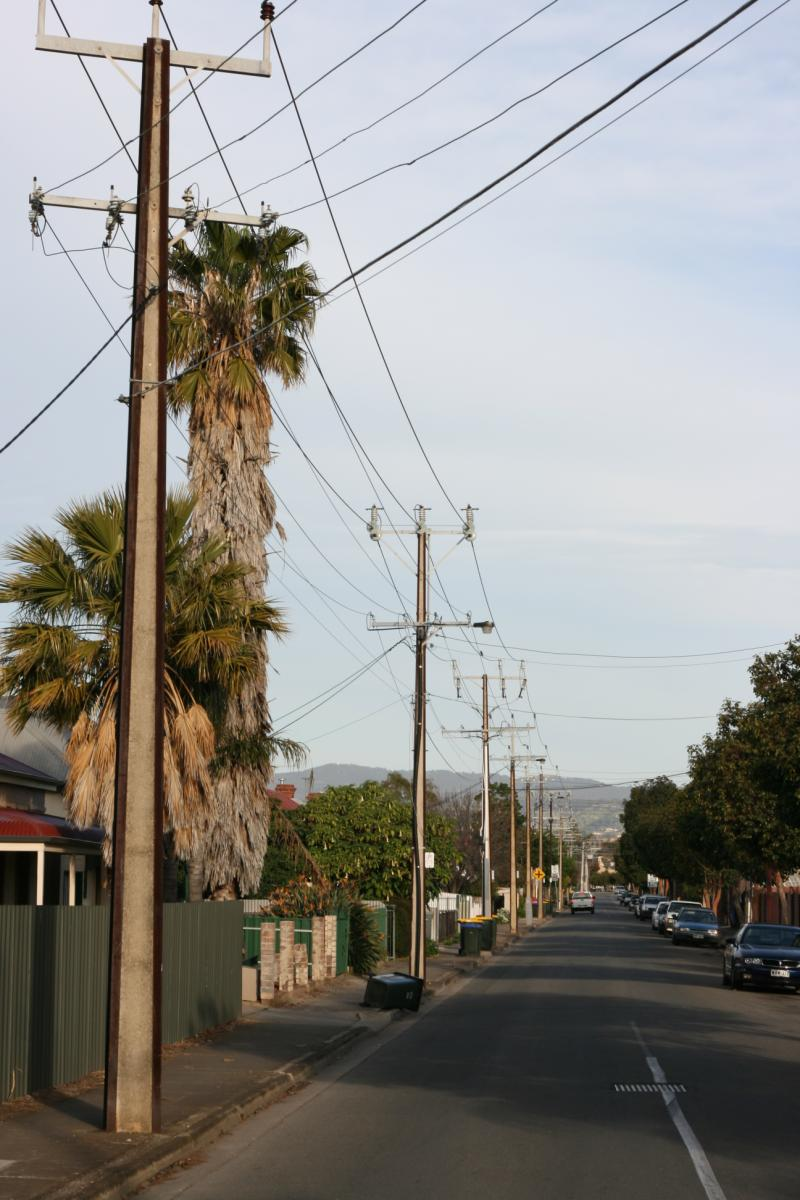
Stobie poles

Hall's "Stonie" ginger beer

== See also ==
- South Australia
