= Popeye (boat) =

Tourist attraction in Adelaide, South Australia

Popeye (or The Popeye') is the name given to a series of motor launches which take paying passengers on pleasure cruises on Torrens Lake, in the North Parklands of Adelaide, capital of South Australia. It is one of the city's top tourist attractions.

== History ==
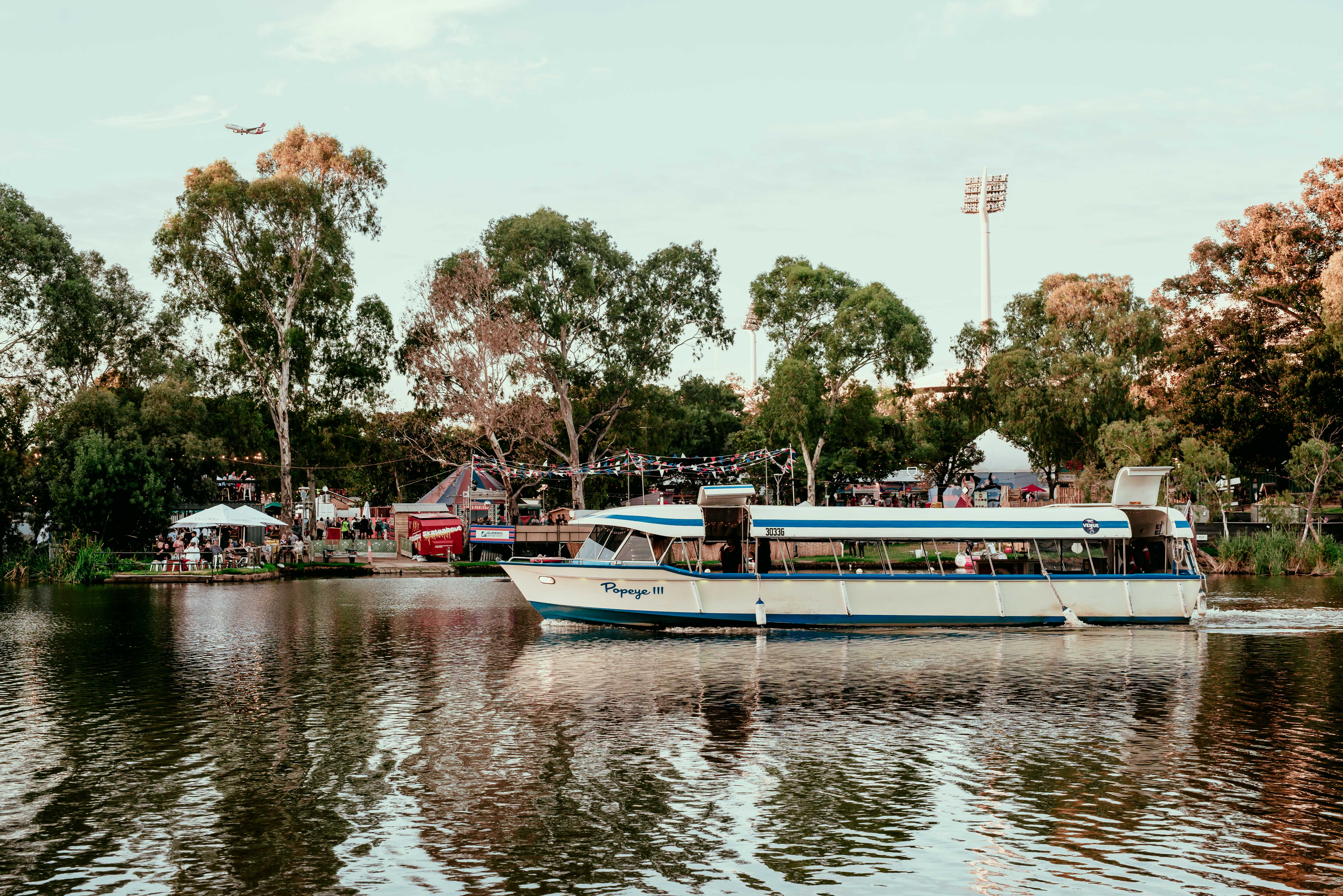
Popeye I on the River Torrens, 27 September 2015

The original Popeye, a 25-foot (7.6 m) boat holding up to 20 passengers, was built for Gordon Stanley Watts, a Gallipoli veteran, by Harold Lounder in 1935 in one of several workshops which were then dotted along the banks of Torrens Lake. She proved so popular that in 1939 a second boat, Miss Centenary, was purchased, which had previously run cruises at Glenelg. She did not however (according to the local legend) gain the same acceptance with the children, who preferred to "wait for Popeye", prompting Watts to re-christen her Popeye II.

Later, three new 38-foot (12 m) jarrah-hulled boats, capable of carrying 40 passengers each, were built at Port Adelaide; they were numbered Popeye 3, Popeye 4 and Popeye 5, running round trips between Elder Park and Adelaide Zoo. Apart from scheduled runs on weekends and holidays during the warmer months, Popeyes were available for private hire, for weddings, children's birthday parties and other events.

During the years that he was skipper of Popeye, if there were a large number of children, Watts would call out "Anyone's birthday today?" If so, the lucky child would be allowed to steer the boat. Amongst the other Popeye skippers were the boatbuilder Harold Lounder and Roland "Sunny" Grey.

In March 1962 Keith Altmann, owner of riverside café, later restaurant, Jolley's Boathouse, took over the Popeye business. In 1982 three new fibreglass launches Popeye I, Popeye II and Popeye III were launched as replacements for the ageing original wooden boats. These boats were launched by then Australian Prime Minister Malcolm Fraser.

After 49 years as the owner, Altmann sold the business to current owners Tony and Lidija Shuman in 2011. He also sold adjacent business Captain Jolley's Paddleboats. The Shumans already owned and operated Elder Park Paddleboats business which operated alongside, as well as a successful bike hire business.

In 2017, the business was taken over by their 23-year-old daughter Bianca Shuman. There are only 3 permanent employees, but the workforce grows to 15 during busy summers. Ms Shuman also runs Captain Jolley's Paddleboats and BBQ Buoys on the same section of the river.

== Recognition ==
- 1988: Winner, South Australian Tourism Award
- 2011: Recognised as the first State Heritage Icon, a list of quintessential companies established through a partnership with the National Trust SA and the Bank of South Australia. (Other State icons include the Balfours frog cake, the Hills Hoist, Haigh's Chocolates, and Coopers Brewery.)

== Significant events ==
- In 1938, boys from Prince Alfred College hired Popeye to celebrate their win in the annual "Head of the River" rowing eight race against St. Peter's College.
- In 1942, Popeye was employed as a gunship, when police with a shotgun attempted to rid Torrens Lake of cormorants (possibly the great cormorant), which had become a pest, attacking the lake's population of swans.
- In 1947, patients of the Adelaide Children's Hospital spastic centre were treated to a ride in Popeye in recognition of the centre's first birthday.
- In 1951, the two Popeyes acted as floating stages for a choral concert performed by four Adelaide choirs under the banner of the S.A. Arts Council for the state's jubilee
- In 1953, following a collision between Popeye 5 and a rented rowboat, Antonio Iuliano, a 24-year-old Adelaide man drowned. One of his companions was rescued by Ray Jolley, of Jolley's boathouse, and a third was rescued by Popeye 5.
- In early 1958, Elizabeth, the Queen Mother toured the Lake aboard Popeye 5, a spotlight on her while 200,000 voices sang Will Ye No Come Back Again.
- In March 1977, Popeye 5 hosted Queen Elizabeth II and Prince Philip followed by a choir in Popeye 4 during the Queen's third official visit to South Australia.
- In 1982, the Prime Minister, Malcolm Fraser, officially launched the three new Popeyes as replacements for the wooden boats.

== In popular culture ==
Popeye features in the 2023 film Emotion Is Dead, written and directed by Pete Williams.
