= Smart Balance =

Food company

Smart Balance is a company that manufactures products including margarine substitutes, flavored microwave popcorn, and peanut butter.

== Products ==
The products claim to have no partially hydrogenated vegetable oils added, no trans fat, and to be comparable in quality to vegetable oil based products.

The oils used in Smart Balance products contain low levels of naturally occurring trans fats, about 70 mcg of trans fat per serving. Some blends in this line include fish oil, while some include only vegetable-based ingredients. The oil blend used in some of the products was developed at Brandeis University.

== History ==
In 2012, Smart Balance acquired Udi’s Healthy Foods, and the parent company was renamed Boulder Brands.
