= Yves Potvin =

Canadian entrepreneur

Yves Potvin is a Canadian entrepreneur, credited with inventing the plant-based hot dog. He is the founder of Yves Veggie Cuisine and Gardein, two plant-based food companies that he later sold. He later founded the plant-based seafood company Konscious Foods and is the majority owner of the Pacific Institute of Culinary Arts.

== Early life and education ==
Potvin was born in Quebec and is the fourth of five children. He grew up in Sherbrooke and attended cooking school for two years prior to running a French nouvelle cuisine restaurant.

== Career ==
Potvin founded Yves Fine Foods in 1985. The company later became Yves Veggie Cuisine in 1992. Yves Veggie Cuisine manufactured plant-based food and Potvin is credited with creating the world's first veggie hot dog. He sold the brand to Hain Celestial Group in 2002. In 2003, Potvin launched Gardein, a meat-free food brand. He sold the company to Pinnacle Foods in 2014.

Yves became the majority owner of the Pacific Institute of Culinary Arts in 2018. In 2021, he founded Konscious Foods, a plant-based seafood company.
