= Pete Williams (director) =

Australian filmmaker

Pete Williams is an Australian filmmaker, known for his 2024 debut feature fiction film Emotion is Dead.

== Early life and education ==
Pete Williams grew up in the northern Adelaide suburb of Elizabeth, South Australia. From a young age, he would borrow equipment from his grandfather, who was an amateur cameraman, for school projects. He was a fan of punk rock and emo music as a youth.

He worked in advertising through most of his twenties, before "taking a gamble" and moving to London to attend the Met Film School run by Ealing Studios in 2006.

== Career ==
Soon after graduating, Williams made commercials, for which he won three consecutive Mofilm awards at the Cannes Lions International Festival of Creativity.

His first independent project was Indie Cities, a series which he screened on YouTube in 2006. Channel 4 picked it up, changing the focus slightly to be about artisans, creating a series of three-minute episodes called Makers which ran from 2014 until 2015. This series gave rise to his 2020 feature documentary The New Breed, about three social entrepreneurs who created social enterprises. The film premiered at the Sustainable Living Film Festival in Istanbul, Turkiye, and was late aired on SBS Television. The film itself was made as a social enterprise, with proceeds going towards equipment and training for young filmmakers from disadvantaged backgrounds worldwide. At this time, Williams was living in the United States, living in Portland, Oregon, after spending 10 years in the UK. He directed the film, which was produced by Vincent Vittorio.

Other television projects include Fearless: The Inside Story of the AFLW (2022, Disney+), and Making Their Mark, for which he was the story producer (2021, Amazon Prime Video).

=== Emotion Is Dead (2023) ===
Williams returned to his home town of Adelaide to make his first feature fiction film, Emotion Is Dead, whose central character is a young emo skateboarder who had lost his job when the Holden factory in Elizabeth closed down in 2017. The film was a passion project for Williams, and looks at "the impact of disability, class, and the power of employment in Australia". The film features actors who live with disability in prominent roles, including Isi Sweeney, an actress with Down syndrome, and mental health issues such as depression, anxiety, and grief are also portrayed by several characters.

The film was shot with a very low budget (around A$300,000, most of it funded by Williams), and features many Adelaide landmarks and icons, including the Big Rocking Horse at Gumeracha, the old Holden factory, Hindley Street, the Adelaide Botanic Garden, Popeye (a boat on the Torrens River), Farmers Union Iced Coffees, West End red tins and a frog cake. The film starred Jude Turner in his debut performance, along with Adam Tuominen, Tatiana Goode, and Gabby Llewelyn. It was written and directed by Williams, and co-produced by him and Brian Hayes, who had worked on Hotel Mumbai. The film took around two years to shoot. Its title is derived from the 2000 album Emotion Is Dead by American emo band The Juliana Theory.

A cast and crew screening in August 2023 received a standing ovation. Emotion Is Dead had its world premiere at the 2023 Adelaide Film Festival. It opened at the Capri Theatre on 28 June 2024, with special guests including former Holden workers. As part of a limited release national Australian Indie Cinema Tour, there were 30 screening events followed by Q&As with cast and crew, and was thereafter shown in other Australian cinemas.
