= URM =

URM may mean:

== Companies, groups, organizations ==
- Under-represented minority
- Ministry of Foreign Affairs (Lithuania) (Lithuanian: Užsienio Reikalų Ministerija)
- Union Rescue Mission, a homeless Christian shelter in Los Angeles
- URM Stores, a retail cooperative in the north-western United States
- Ulster Resistance Movement, more commonly known as the Ulster Resistance an Ulster Loyalist paramilitary group founded by members of the DUP (Democratic Unionist Party) against the Anglo-Irish Treaty.

== Science, technology, engineering ==
- Uniform Requirements for Manuscripts Submitted to Biomedical Journals
- Unreinforced masonry building, a construction method
- Universal Rocket Module, modular stages of the Russian Angara rocket

== Other uses ==
- Urap language (ISO 639 language code: urm)
- United Republics of Mars, the technocratic government that created Alita, from the 2019 film Alita: Battle Angel
- Ulster Resistance Movement, more commonly known as the Ulster Resistance. An Ulster Loyalist paramilitary group founded by members of the DUP (Democratic Unionist Party) against the Anglo-Irish Agreement.
