= Cambia Health Solutions =

Health insurance company in Portland, Oregon

- Type: Nonprofit
- Industry: Health care
- Founded: 1996
- Founder: Mark Ganz
- Headquarters: Portland, Oregon, United States,
- Key people: Jared Short, CEO and president
- Number of employees: 4,439 (2022)
- Website: cambiahealth.com

Cambia Health Solutions is a nonprofit health care company based in Portland, Oregon. It is the parent company of Regence, a member of the Blue Cross Blue Shield Association operating in Oregon, Idaho, Utah, and Washington; Asuris Northwest Health; BridgeSpan Health; and LifeMap.

Prior to November 2013, Cambia was known as The Regence Group. Cambia is the parent company or a minority investor in more than 20 companies in the U.S.

== History ==
Cambia began in the Pacific Northwest as Pierce County Medical Bureau in 1917, when timber workers decided to pool their wages together in case one of them experienced injury or sickness. Cambia's predecessor company was formed by a series of mergers in the 1990s to create a "regional alliance" (Regence) of nonprofit health plans that would be substantial enough to continue operating in its historical service areas as national for-profit insurers entered the market.

In the Pacific Northwest, there were approximately 30 health plans in 1997 and by 2002 there were 20. Activity increased when Thurston County Medical Bureau merged with King County Medical Bureau, and increased more when Pierce County Medical Bureau and King County Medical Bureau merged with the Blue Cross Blue Shield of Oregon (which had themselves merged in 1983), to form The Benchmark Group in 1995 with Richard Woolworth as CEO. Blue Cross Blue Shield of Utah joined in 1996, and Blue Shield of Idaho joined shortly thereafter, under an administrative services agreement that allowed BSI to remain owned by its members as a mutual insurance company, but have Regence handle the management. Skagit County Medical Bureau and Whatcom County Medical Bureau merged in 1998, as part of the unaligned movement, to form Northwest Washington Medical Bureau. In 2001, Northwest Washington Medical Bureau merged with Regence. In 2003, Richard Woolworth retired, and Mark Ganz became CEO and president, through 2020, until retiring from the company.

In 2017, Cambia commemorated its 100-year birthday by giving all employees four hours of paid volunteer time and a 50 percent match of all of their individual charitable giving during August. That year, according to Cambia, the company had approximately 5,000 employees serving six health plans in four states, providing insurance to more than 2.6 million people.

In 2018, the company appointed its first Chief Artificial Intelligence Officer, Faraz Shafiq, to lead its data science and A.I. activity.

On March 12, 2019, Cambia and Blue Cross Blue Shield of North Carolina announced a strategic affiliation, which was subsequently cancelled, due to Blue Cross Blue Shield NC management issues, followed by the retirement of Cambia CEO Ganz.

== Cambia Grove ==
In 2015, Cambia Health Solutions founded Cambia Grove, a health care innovation hub. According to the company, Cambia Grove was created as part of their ongoing innovation strategy. The hub focuses on supporting health care startups through the creation of a startup census, a database of health care startups in Washington State that includes 468 health startups in Washington state, 305 in the life sciences area, and a number of companies in the digital health, health IT, and health care services.

== Philanthropy ==
In 2007, the Cambia Health Foundation, Cambia's 501(c)(3), was founded as a grant-making organization focusing on investments in the areas of palliative care, health care transformation, and children's behavioral health. The company's regional health plans launched their own comprehensive palliative care benefits program in June 2014. Since 2009, the Cambia Health Foundation invested more than $30 million to advance palliative care awareness, access and quality.

The foundation's investments include Sojourns, a program focused on developing, planning and implementing hospital-based palliative care programs in the Pacific Northwest. In 2014, the Cambia Health Foundation created the Sojourns Scholar Leadership Program to promote the next generation of palliative care leaders by investing in their projects and professional development. Selected scholars each receive a two-year, $180,000 grant to conduct innovative and effective clinical, research, education, or policy project and to develop and implement a personal leadership development plan. In addition, an advisory board member mentors each scholar. As of June 2017, the Sojourns Scholar Leadership Program has approved four cohorts, each consisting of 40 leaders in the field (10 each year), and given out a total of $7.2 million in grants.

== Investments ==
Cambia Health Solution invests in non-insurance health care technology and service companies such as GNS Healthcare, Qliance, and True Link. Most of these investments are through their investment arm, Echo Health Ventures. In 2016 Cambia Health and the investment arm of Blue Cross Blue Shield of North Carolina, Mosaic Health Solutions, combined to form the investment entity Echo Health Ventures. According to Echo Health Ventures, their goal is to deploy capital to health care companies with a consumer-centric focus. Cambia Health Solutions has also made investments in digital health companies such as TytoCare, MDsave, Maxwell Health, Wildflower Health, PokitDok and ClearCare. It has launched companies including HealthSparq, OmedaRx, LifeMap, SpendWell, Hubbub Health and Wellero, a mobile health payment app startup launched in late 2013 then shuttered in January 2016.

In 2016, HealthSparq and SpendWell Health joined under the HealthSparq brand to offer a health care e-commerce platform that would allow members to comparison shop for health care and purchase medical appointments.

== Executive compensation ==
Regence's president, Mark Ganz, earned $897,671 from Regence BlueShield in Washington in 2008, including a bonus of $550,548. In Oregon, his compensation package totaled $872,665. In both states, Ganz brought home $1,770,336. The other high ranking Regence officials with six-figure salaries included Mohandas Nair, executive vice president and chief marketing executive, who earned $356,681 from Washington, and $295,140 from Oregon for a total of $651,821. Regence's treasurer, Steve Hooker, treasurer, who's announced his retirement, earned $337,543 from Washington and $304,641 in Oregon for a total of $642,184. William Barr, executive vice president of operations, took home $430,926 from Washington, and $377,119 from Oregon for a total of $808,045. And, Kerry Barnett, executive vice president of Regence's corporate division, earned $312,482 from Washington and $302,990 in Oregon for a total of $615,472.

== Regulation, investigations and lawsuits ==
The Seattle Times published an article on February 8, 2012, alleging that non-profit insurance outfits, including Regence BlueShield, are stockpiling billions of dollars in reserves while simultaneously increasing their rates.

In 2014, a class lawsuit was filed challenging the corporations' nonprofit status, and it was dismissed with prejudice.

In 2016, Washington State levied $750,000 in fines against Cambia in response to Asuris Northwest Health and Regence BlueShield policyholder complaints of 2010 and 2011.

In January 2021, as the parent company of Regence BlueShield, Asuris Northwest Health and Commencement Bay Risk Management Insurance Co.; Cambia was fined $10,000 by Washington State for continuing its application to merge with Blue Cross BlueShield NC (BCBSNC), without filing required notification that Dr. Patrick H. Conway, slated as CEO of the merged company, had undergone a felony arrest while driving, and later resigned from BCBSNC.
