= Oesch =

Oesch is a surname of Swiss German origin, being a cognate of the surname Esch, a German habitational surname meaning "ash". Notable people with the surname include:

- Karl Lennart Oesch (1892–1978), Finnish general
- Tom Oesch (born 1980), Swiss filmmaker

== See also ==
- Oesch's die Dritten, a Yodel Volksmusik family group from Switzerland
- Eash
