= Best Life =

Best Life may refer to:

- Best Life (magazine), a luxury service magazine for men
- "Best Life" (song), a song by Cardi B
- "Best Life", a song by Allday from Starry Night Over the Phone
- "Best Life", a song by Hardy Caprio
- Best Life, a food brand of Boulder Brands
- Best Life, a 2021 album by French rapper Naps
