= C&W =

C&W may refer to:

- Country music (Country and Western)
- Cable & Wireless plc
- Cushman & Wakefield Plc, real estate services firm.
- C&W, a brand of frozen goods owned by Pinnacle Foods
- Co-operative Wholesale Society, a former name of The Co-operative Group, UK
