= Tim's =

Tim's may refer to:

- Tim Hortons, Canadian fast food chain
- Tim's Cascade Snacks, an American brand
- Tim's (bar), a former New York City Irish bar and restaurant, more commonly known as Costello's

== See also ==
- Cherwell Boathouse, a restaurant and boat storage facility in Oxford, England, once known as Tims's
