= Yves Veggie Cuisine =

Brand of alternative meat

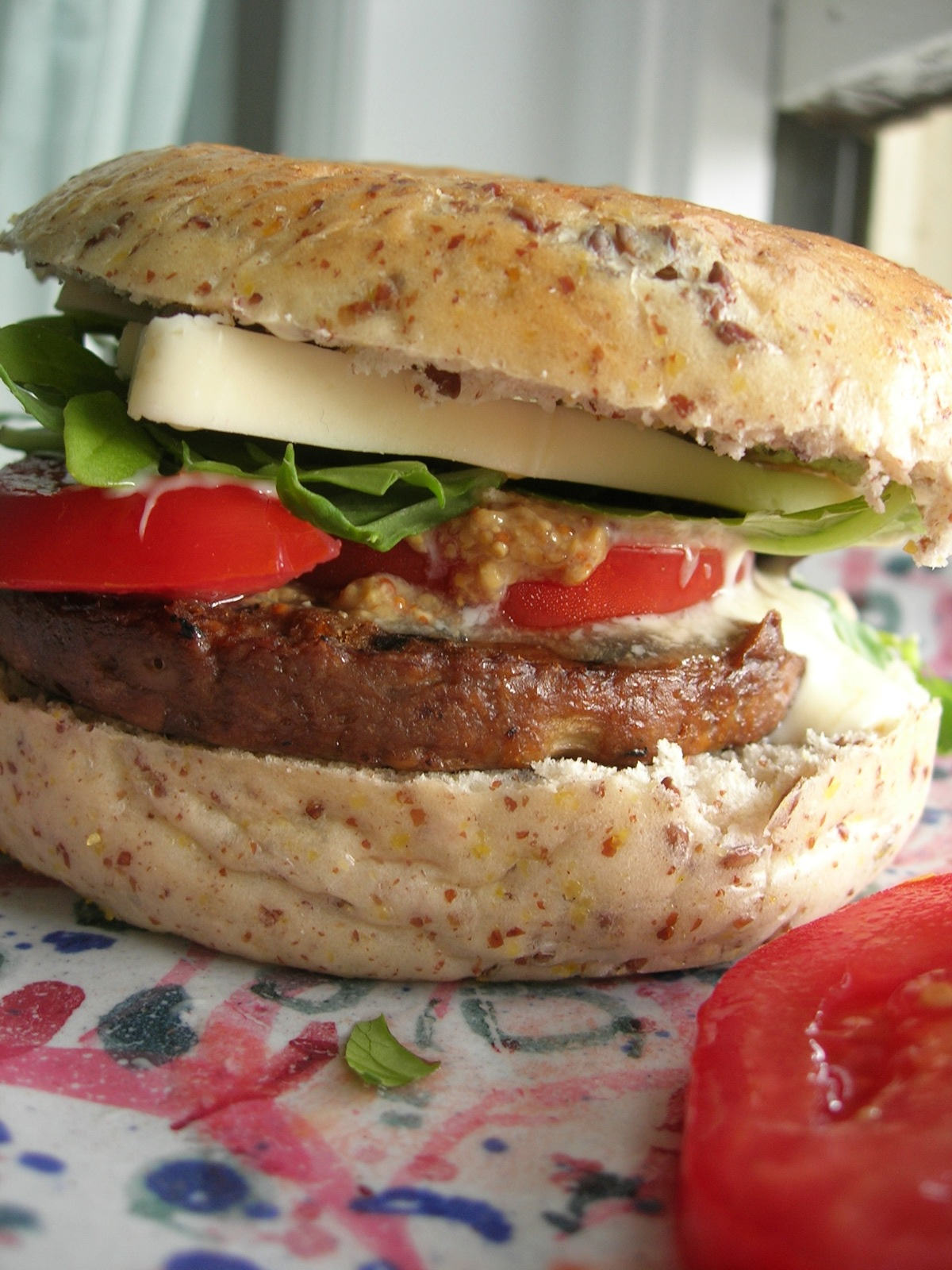
- Yves veggie burger
- Product type: Alternative meats
- Current owner: Maple Leaf Foods
- Introduced: 1985 by Yves Potvin
- Website: Official website

Yves Veggie Cuisine is an alternative meat brand owned by Maple Leaf Foods.

== History ==
Yves Veggie Cuisine was founded in 1985 by Yves Potvin as a healthy alternative to conventional fast foods. Originally named Yves Fine Foods, it was re-branded as Yves Veggie Cuisine in 1992. The first product was a meatless hot dog, and by 1999 it produced approximately 500,000 packages of meat-substitute products per week which included products such as veggie bacon, veggie pizza, and veggie ground round. Company revenue was approximately $35 million by the year 2000.

Potvin sold the brand to Hain Celestial in 2002. The same year it supplied a soy-based burger to McDonald's Canada as a product test for the market.

In 2025, it was announced that Hain Celestial Group would be discontinuing the Yves Veggie Cuisine brand due to poor sales.

In 2026, Maple Leaf Foods announced it would be relaunching Yves Veggie Cuisine in the summer.

== Products ==
Yves Veggie Cuisine is an alternative meat brand with products that include ground round, burgers, deli meats, hotdogs, sausages, and bologna,
