= Udi's Healthy Foods =

Brand of gluten-free goods

- Company type: Subsidiary
- Industry: Gluten-free food
- Founded: 2008; 18 years ago
- Founder: Udi Baron
- Headquarters: Denver, Colorado, U.S.
- Products: Bagels, English muffins, bread, buns, lasagna, baguettes, granola, muffins, pizza
- Owner: Conagra Brands
- Website: udisglutenfree.com

Udi's Healthy Foods is a brand of gluten-free food owned by Conagra Brands.

== History ==
Udi's started as a group of cafes in Denver, Colorado, owned by Udi Baron. Baron's first cafe was called Udi the Sandwich Man, which opened in 1994. In 2008, Baron teamed with a gluten-free baker and started producing gluten free products. The pair focused on the 10% of Americans that are either gluten intolerant or have celiac disease, knowing that typical gluten-free products on the market "tasted terrible". The market was worth $1.6 billion at the time. Retailers initially rejected gluten-free products, seeing them as a "fad"; the market has since grown to $4.2 billion annually.

Sales of Udi's reached $60 million in 2012, and the brand was purchased by Boulder Brands for $125 million in 2013. Some locations of Smashburger first offered the Udi's gluten-free bun. In 2016 Pinnacle Foods purchased Boulder Brands. Two years later, Conagra Brands bought Pinnacle Foods in order to expand their frozen foods line. Conagra Brands is the current owner of the Udi's product line. It supplies Udi's brand products to many grocery stores and restaurants.
