= Elder Park =

Public park in Adelaide, South Australia

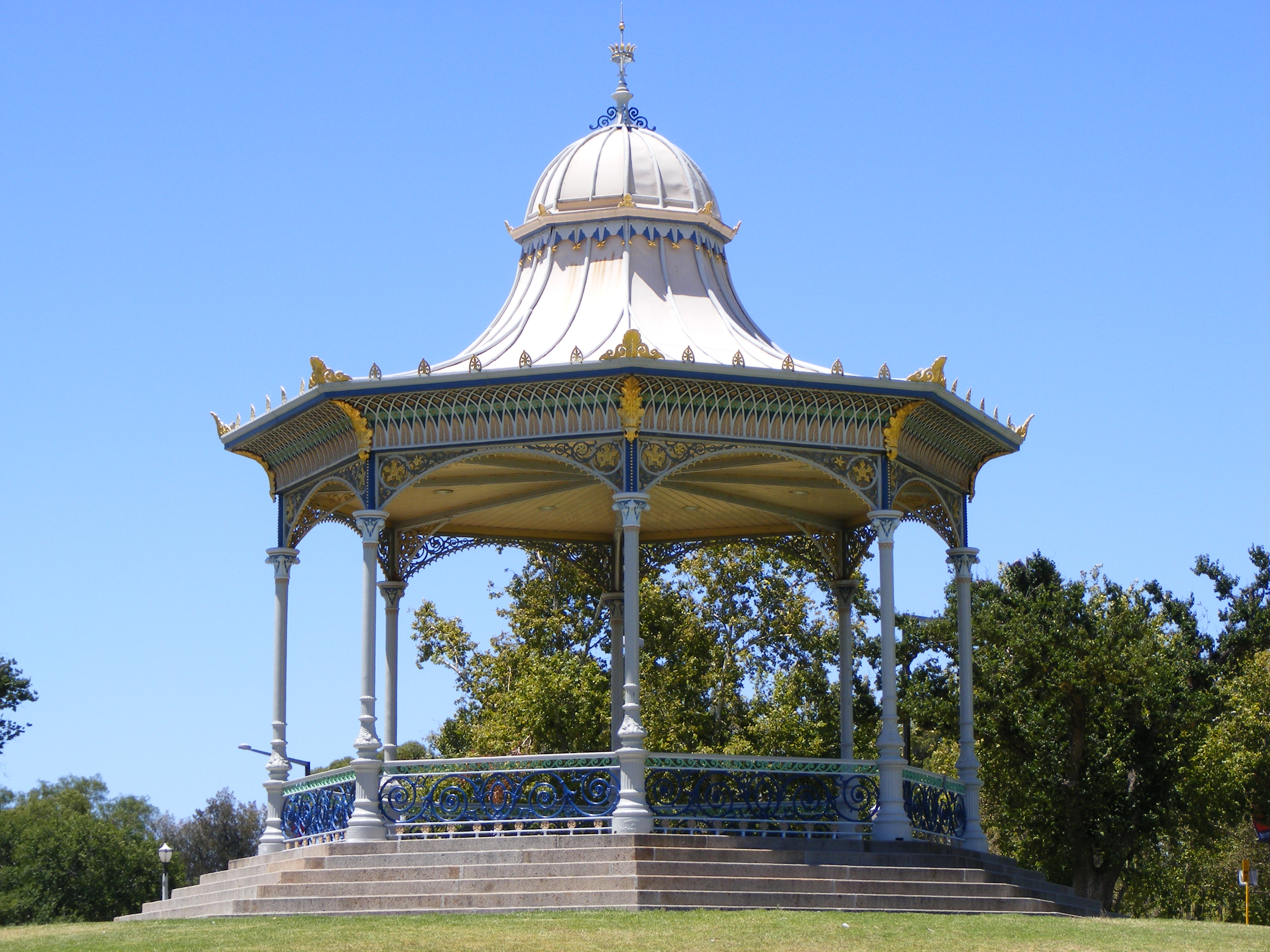
- Elder Park Rotunda in 2008
- Interactive map of Elder Park
- Type: Urban park
- Location: Adelaide, South Australia, Australia
- Coordinates: 34.9184°S 138.5984°E
- Established: 1881
- Designer: August Wilhelm Pelzer
- Etymology: Thomas Elder
- Operator: City of Adelaide

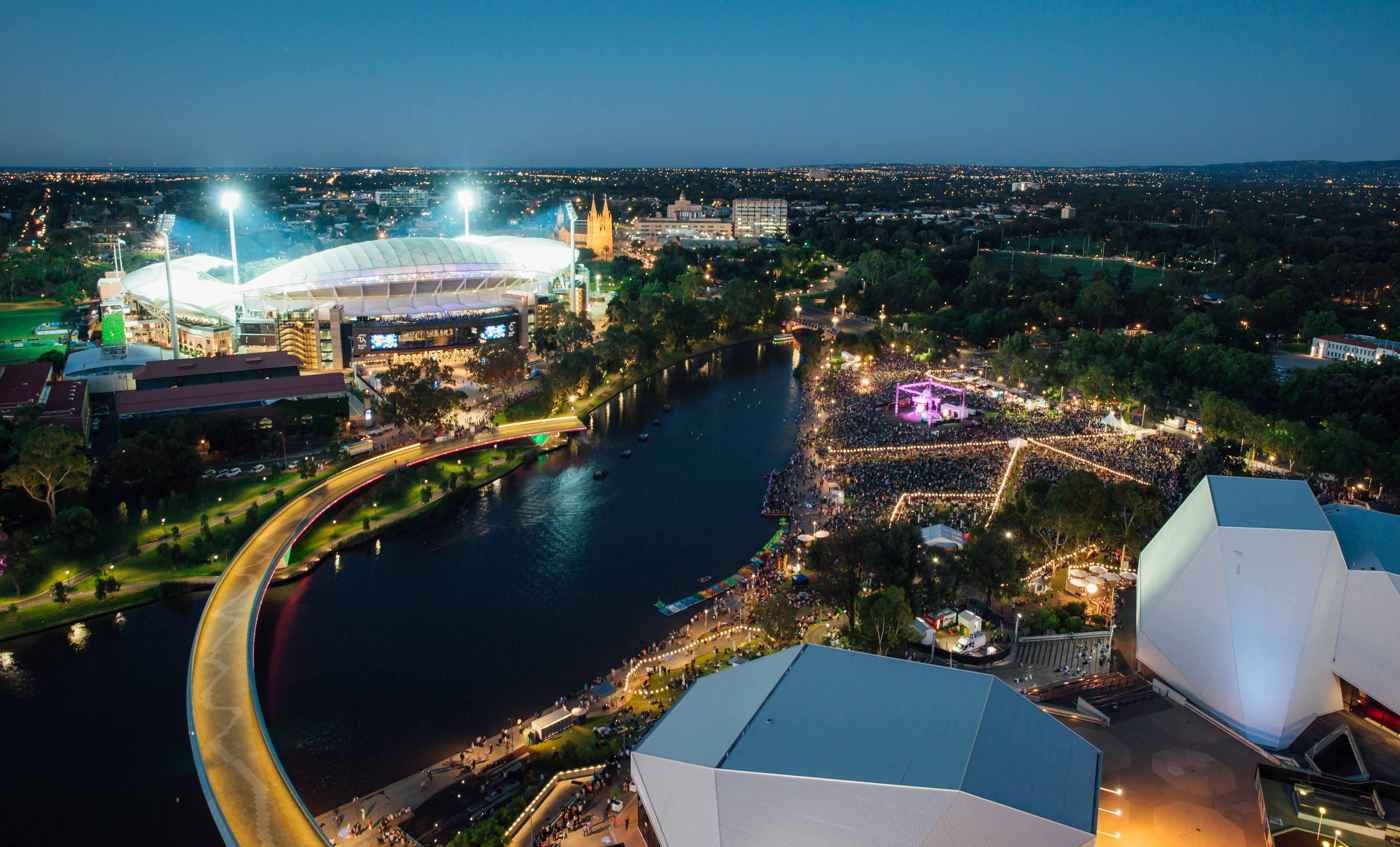
Elder Park and riverbank set up for New Year's Eve celebrations in 2016

Elder Park is a public open space in the city of Adelaide, South Australia on the southern bank of the River Torrens and that is bordered by the Adelaide Festival Centre and North Terrace. It is part of Park 26 of the Adelaide Park Lands, and the Torrens Linear Park also passes through Elder Park.

Originally named "Rotunda Park", the park was renamed in 1907 in honour of Sir Thomas Elder, an early settler, pastoralist, businessman and philanthropist, who had donated the Elder Park Rotunda, erected in 1882. The ironwork for the rotunda was fabricated at the Saracen Foundry in Glasgow. The Popeye motor launches cruise the Torrens Lake, from Elder Park upstream as far as the Adelaide Zoo; paddleboats for hire on the lake are also available.

It is the home of the annual Christmas Carols by Candlelight for Adelaide and also hosts Symphony under the Stars and the Adelaide Festival of Arts.
