= URM Stores =

American retailers' cooperative

- Formerly: United Retail Merchants
- Company type: Retailers' cooperative
- Founded: 1921; 105 years ago in Spokane, Washington, United States
- Headquarters: 7511 N Freya St, Spokane, Washington, United States
- Areas served: Washington; Idaho; Oregon; Montana
- Key people: Roger White (President & CEO)
- Products: Western Family Foods; Food Club
- Members: Rosauers; Yoke's Fresh Market; Super 1 Foods; Harvest Foods
- Number of employees: 2,755
- Divisions: Rosauers; Super 1 Foods; Huckleberry's Natural Market
- Website: urmstores.com/

URM Stores, Inc. (formerly United Retail Merchants) of Spokane, Washington is an American retailers' cooperative serving independent supermarkets in Idaho, Montana, Oregon, and Washington. It was founded in 1921 and is a member of Retailer Owned Food Distributors & Associates. It used to be an owner of Western Family Foods until 2018, when Western Family products were replaced by Topco brands which include Food Club, Crav'n Flavor, Top Care, Simply Done, Culinary Tours, Wide Awake Coffee Co., That's Smart, Tippy Toes, Paws Happy Life, Pure Harmony and CharKing. It purchased Rosauers Supermarket in 2000.

Its affiliated supermarkets include Family Foods, Harvest Foods, Rosauers, Yoke's Fresh Market, and Super 1 Foods.

== History ==
URM Stores was founded as United Retail Merchants as a co-op of five stores in 1921. It became a distributor of Western Family Foods from 1968 to 2016.
