= Electric Lightwave =

American fiber optic communications company

- Type: Subsidiary
- Industry: Telecom Service - Domestic
- Founded: 1996
- Headquarters: Vancouver, Washington; 45.599°N 122.4855°W
- Key people: Marc Willency, CEO
- Products: Data Networking and Internet; Managed and Cloud Services; Voice Communications; Colocation and Equipment; Business Bundles
- Revenue: $538 million (2017)
- Number of employees: 823
- Parent: Zayo Group Holdings
- Website: www.electriclightwave.com

Electric Lightwave, formerly known as Integra, was a privately owned provider of fiber-based, carrier-grade networking, communications and technology solutions, headquartered in Vancouver, Washington, United States. In 2016, the company split into two divisions, Electric Lightwave and Integra, and changed its parent company name to Electric Lightwave. In early 2017, Electric Lightwave was acquired by Zayo Group Holdings for $1.4 billion.

Founded by Ted Berns and Dudley Slater in 1996, the company was a facilities-based provider of communication and networking services and served 35 metropolitan markets across eleven states. The company expanded to serve businesses of all sizes. As of 2017, the privately held company had annual revenues of $538 million, with approximately 823 employees company-wide.

== History ==
The company was founded in 1996 through the acquisition of OGI Telecomm, a shared tenant provider formed in 1984 to provide voice and data services to the Oregon Graduate Institute (then based in unincorporated Washington County) and businesses in the AmberGlen Business Park, a nearby office park. The company became Integra Telecom in 1998.

By the year 2000 Integra had grown to annual revenues of $42 million, and grown to around $150 million in 2005. Integra Telecom doubled in size through the acquisition of Electric Lightwave (ELI) from Citizens Communications (later renamed Frontier Communications) in 2006, and in 2007 acquired Eschelon Telecom, which again doubled the size of the company. ELI was a telecommunications company originally formed in 1988, by John Warta, John Rivenburgh, Earl Kamsky and Richard Furnival, formed to compete with US West and GTE in the Pacific Northwest. Portland General Electric was an initial investor of ELI; then, Citizens Utilities became the largest investor in 1990. ELI became the first company to compete locally in Oregon, Washington, Idaho, Utah, and one of the first in California and Arizona. Integra purchased ELI for $243 million in cash as well as an assumption of $4 million in debt in a deal that closed on August 1, 2006. The Eschelon purchase was for $566 million in cash and $144 million in assumed debt.

In 2007, Integra had 1,100 employees and annual revenues of $340 million before their purchase of Eschelon. That year, they moved part of their operations into the 20-story Lloyd Center Tower in Portland's Lloyd District on the city's eastside. This is near their headquarters at the 1201 Lloyd Building. By 2009 the company had grown to annual revenues of more than $680 million and employed more than 550 people at their headquarters and 2,300 people across the company. In 2009, the company brought in new investors to reduce its debt load by approximately $600 million. Integra accumulated much of the debt due to its earlier acquisitions, and, according to news reports, faced the possibility of bankruptcy due to breaching covenants in its loan agreements.

In 2011, the company announced the replacement of co-founder and thirteen year CEO Dudley Slater. According to news reports, under Slater, the upstart company grew into one of Portland's largest businesses and became a leader among a new class of competitive Internet companies.

Later in 2011, Kevin O'Hara became the third chief executive officer of the company that year when he was named to replace Tom Casey in December. O'Hara announced that Integra had marked a return to financial stability along with substantial growth for the company’s network assets Ethernet-based product portfolio and service offerings. By the end of 2012, Integra had expanded its enterprise and wholesale customer base, contributing to an increasingly diversified customer and revenue mix. Integra also renamed its Electric Lightwave subsidiary to Integra Wholesale to reflect its longstanding integration into Integra's business. The company also announced the completed acquisition of equity interests previously held by Goldman, Sachs & Co., Integra’s largest shareholder, by investment funds affiliated with Searchlight Capital Partners.

In 2013, Integra closed a new $845 million senior secured credit facilities, including a $60 million revolving credit facility (undrawn at closing), a $585 million first lien term loan due 2019 and a $200 million second lien term loan due 2020. The net proceeds from the new credit facilities were used to refinance Integra’s previously outstanding term loan and bonds, and for general corporate purposes. To better align with its expanded market focus, Integra re-branded in February 2013 and introduced a new company logo and tagline, "Technology You Trust. People You Know." In 2014, the company moved its headquarters from Portland to neighboring Vancouver, Washington.

In August 2016, Integra split itself into two standalone businesses, Electric Lightwave and Integra, and the corporate entity which owned them was named Electric Lightwave.

Zayo's completion of the acquisition in 2017 marked the end of a period of significant change beginning in 2011, during which the company cycled through 4 different CEOs, and saw its revenues decline from $680 million (2009) to $538 million, while reducing its workforce from 2,300 to 823.

After serving many communities across the Western, Rocky-Mountain and Midwestern United States for over 20 years, while employing thousands of people, Zayo announced the immediate integration of the company's operations into its Fiber Solutions and SMB Allstream business units while reporting guidance for continued growth of the combined organization.

== Products and services ==
Electric Lightwave owned and operated a fiber optic network consisting of a 4,000-mile long-haul fiber-optic network, 4,000 miles of metropolitan fiber and a nationwide IP/MPLS network. Additionally, the company offered data networking and high-speed Internet, managed and cloud services, voice communications, colocation and equipment and business bundles to small-to-medium businesses as well as large enterprises in 35 metropolitan markets including cities in Arizona, California, Colorado, Idaho, Minnesota, North Dakota, Oregon, Montana, Nevada, Utah and Washington.

== See also ==
- List of Washington (state) companies
