= Celeste (frozen pizza) =

Frozen pizza

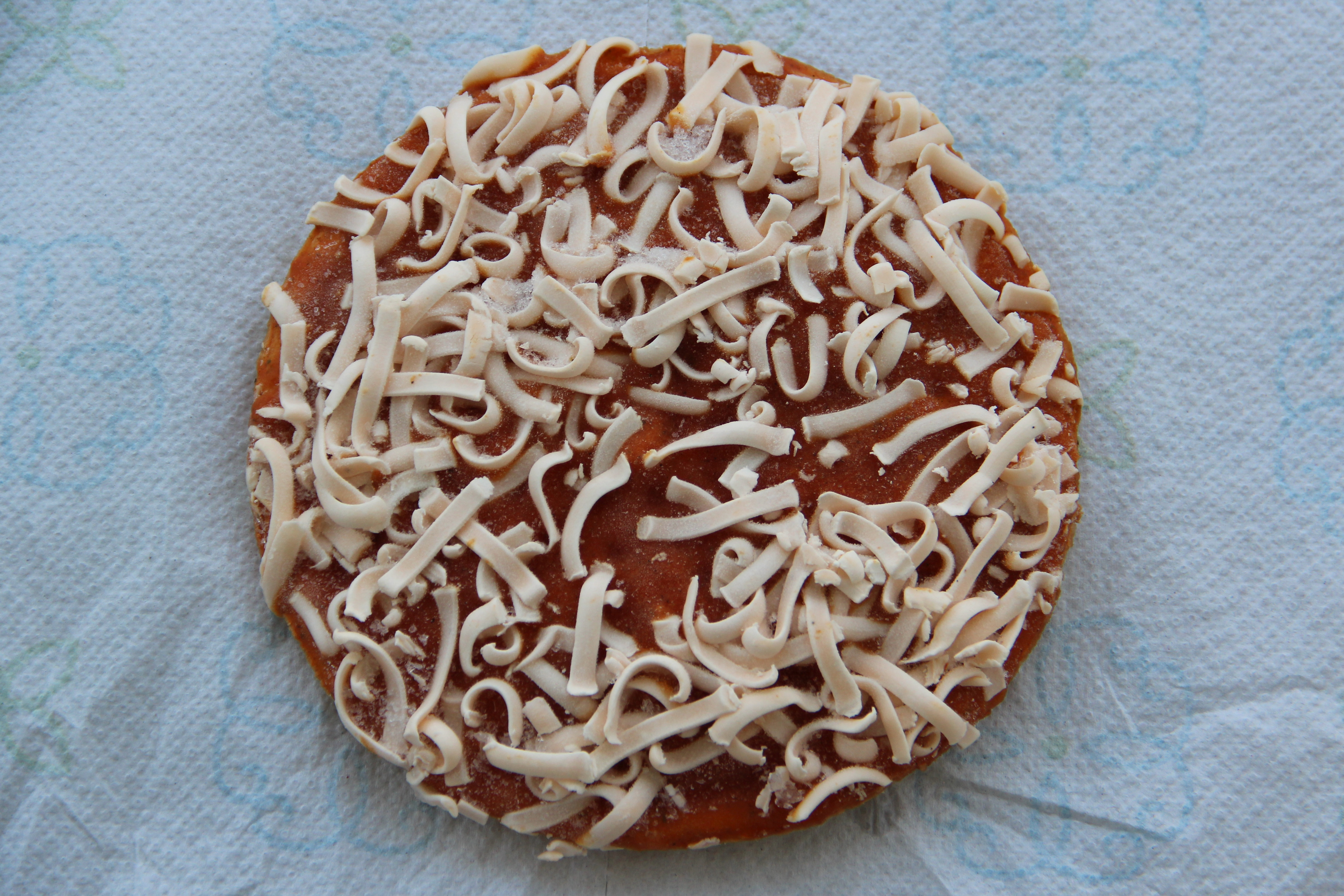
- Frozen Celeste Pizza for One
- Product type: Pizza
- Current owner: Conagra
- Country: United States
- Introduced: 1962
- Discontinued: 2026

Celeste was an American brand of frozen pizza. It was widely referred to by its former name Mama Celeste. The brand's slogan was Abbondanza, which means "Abundance" in Italian. In October 2026, Conagra Brands abruptly discontinued the Celeste brand and ended future production, noting that the brand was no longer a priority for continued investment.

== Background ==
The product was named after Celeste (née Luise) Lizio (1908–1988), who carried the nickname "Mama Celeste". She was born in San Angelo, Italy and came to the United States from Italy with her husband, Anthony, in the 1920s. They settled on Chicago's West Side, where they opened their first restaurant in 1937. In 1962, the Lizios closed the restaurant and began selling pizzas to other restaurants.

The Quaker Oats Company acquired the product in 1969. Celeste frozen pizza was one of the top-selling brands in the 1970s (with Mrs. Lizio, "Mama Celeste," prominently featured in the brand's television advertising) but subsequently experienced declines. Lizio died of a heart condition in 1988 at age 80. The Celeste brand was later acquired by Aurora Foods and then Pinnacle Foods. In 2018, Conagra Brands acquired Pinnacle Foods, which included the Celeste brand. As of 2025, Celeste Pizza was produced and distributed by Conagra. The brand was discontinued in October 2026.

== See also ==
- List of frozen food brands
- List of Conagra brands
