= Audiosocket =

Music licensing tech company in the United States

Audiosocket is a music licensing and technology company founded by Brent McCrossen and Jennifer Miller with dual headquarters in Seattle, WA and New Orleans, LA.

Audiosocket are the creators of MaaS (Music-as-a-Service), a music search and licensing technology designed for integration with video and photo sharing platforms, virtual worlds, online games and social networks. Audiosocket's MaaS™ technology was first launched with Vimeo in the form of Vimeo's online Music Store. Audiosocket has integrated MaaS to launch online storefronts with partners including MOFILM, Indieflix, and LearnCreate.

AudioSocket's service can be used by independent filmmakers to license tracks for use in their films and other creative projects.

In 2013, Audiosocket collaborated with SourceAudio to add licensing watermarks to the latter's five million audio tracks. The watermarking software is called LicenceD and is intended to help musicians and composers collect royalties when their tracks are played and distributed.

== See also ==
- Audio watermark
