= Wish-Bone =

American salad dressing and condiment brand

The Wish-Bone logo

Wish-Bone is an American brand of salad dressing, marinades, dips and pasta salad. The original salad dressing was based on a recipe served at the Wishbone restaurant in Kansas City, Missouri, founded by ex-soldier Phillip Sollomi in 1945 along with Lena Sollomi, Phillip's mother.

The Italian dressing served at the Wishbone was based on a recipe from Lena Sollomi's Sicilian family which was a blend of oil, vinegar, herbs and spices. Demand for the salad dressing proved so high that Phillip started a separate operation to produce it for sale, making it by the barrel.

The brand was acquired by Lipton, part of the Unilever portfolio, in 1958, and was manufactured in the Kansas City area. In 2013, Pinnacle Foods acquired Wish-Bone from Unilever. In turn, ConAgra acquired Pinnacle Foods on October 26, 2018.

== See also ==
- List of brand name condiments
