= Esch (surname) =

Esch is a surname. Notable people with the surname include:

- Arno Esch (1928–1951), German politician
- Edward Esch (born 1970), lyricist for, and possibly pseudonym of, composer Eric Whitacre
- En Esch (born 1968), German musician
- Eric Esch (born 1966), American boxer better known as Butterbean
- Jake Esch (born 1990), American baseball player
- Jan van Essen (died 1523), one of the first two Lutheran martyrs, whose surname was often rendered Esch in German writings.
- John J. Esch (1861–1941), American attorney and politician
- Marvin L. Esch (1927–2010), U.S. Representative from Michigan
- Mathilde Esch (1815–1904), Austrian genre painter
- Natasha Esch, Canadian model
- Nicolaus van Esch (1507–1578), Dutch theologian
- Vincent Esch (1876–1950), British architect

== See also ==
- Von der Esch, surname
- Oesch, surname
- Eash, surname
