= Boulder Brands =

American food company

- Formerly: Smart Balance
- Company type: Subsidiary
- Traded as: Nasdaq: BDBD
- Industry: Vegan and gluten free packaged foods
- Founded: 2005; 21 years ago
- Headquarters: Boulder, Colorado
- Brands: Earth Balance, Evol, Glutino, Gardein, Udi's
- Parent: Pinnacle Foods
- Website: boulderbrands.com

Boulder Brands is an American food company based in Boulder, Colorado. It used to be known as Smart Balance. The company traded on the Nasdaq under the symbol BDBD. The company's brands include Smart Balance, Udi's, Glutino, Earth Balance, EVOL and Best Life. In 2013 Boulder Brands acquired gluten-free Davies Bakery in the UK The company announced plans to discontinue the Bestlife spread and Smart Balance Butter Blend categories in 2013.

In November 2015, Pinnacle Foods announced it would be acquiring Boulder Brands for around $710 million, as part of the company’s strategy to expand its health and wellness services.

== See also ==
- List of food companies
