= Von der Esch =

von der Esch is a surname of German origin. Notable people with the surname include:

- Cecilia von der Esch (born 1985), Swedish actress and comedian
- Björn von der Esch (1930–2010), Swedish politician
- Hansjoachim von der Esch (1899–1976), German explorer and ambassador

== See also ==
- Leighton Vander Esch, American football player
- Esch (surname)
