= Red Canoe Credit Union =

- Company type: Credit Union
- Industry: Financial Services
- Headquarters: Longview, Washington, United States
- Number of locations: 11 (2025)
- Total assets: $1.13 billion (2024)
- Website: www.redcanoecu.com

Red Canoe Credit Union is an American credit union headquartered in Longview, Washington.

Red Canoe Credit Union was founded as Weyerhaeuser Credit Union in 1937 at an organizational meeting held at a Weyerhaeuser mill. Wally Ohfls was the credit union's first chief executive officer and was succeeded by his wife, Esther Ohlfs, when he was deployed with the U.S. armed forces during World War II. The credit union's name was changed to Weyerhaeuser Employees' Credit Union in 1994 and, again, to Red Canoe Credit Union in 2006. In 2014 it merged with the smaller Cowlitz Credit Union.

As of 2024, the credit union has 11 branches in Washington and Oregon. It has assets as of 2024 of about $1.13 billion, and serves over 60,000 members.

== History ==
Red Canoe Credit Union was founded in 1937 in Longview, Washington, as the Weyerhaeuser Timber Company, Longview Branch, Sawmill Division No. 2203 Federal Credit Union. The organization was established by employees of the Weyerhaeuser Timber Company following a recommendation by plant manager Harry Morgan to form a cooperative financial institution to serve workers’ lending and savings needs. The federal charter was approved on May 26, 1937, with 114 charter members, and operations began under treasurer-manager W. C. “Wally” Ohlfs. The name was inspired by an employee canoe race on the Cowlitz River, where the winning red canoe was paddled by Ohlfs, who allegedly used prize money to fund the first deposits.

During the 1940s and 1950s, membership expanded to include workers from additional Weyerhaeuser divisions in several states, including operations in the continental United States and Hawaii. In 1959, the credit union adopted the name Weyerhaeuser Federal Credit Union. It Continued growth led to construction of a new main office in Longview in 1966, followed by additional branches in the region.

Following negotiations with the Weyerhaeuser Company, the institution adopted the name Red Canoe Credit Union in 2007. The name change marked its transition from a company-associated institution to a community-based credit union.

In 2014, Red Canoe merged with Cowlitz Credit Union, expanding its presence in Southwest Washington. The credit union surpassed US$1 billion in assets in 2020.

== Membership and Services ==
Red Canoe offers retail financial services to individuals and businesses, including checking and savings accounts, loans, credit cards, and investment products. Membership is open to people living, working, worshiping, or attending school in Washington or select counties in Oregon, California, as well as family members of existing members. As of 2024, the credit union operated 11 branches, served over 60,000 members, and held approximately US$1.13 billion in assets.

== Financials ==
As of early 2025, Red Canoe Credit Union reported total assets of approximately US$1.1 billion and a membership of around 59,000 to 60,000 individuals. The credit union operated 11 branches across Washington and Oregon.

== See also ==
- Credit unions in the United States
