= GiftTree =

GiftTree is an American online retailer based in Vancouver, Washington. The company sells gift baskets, wine gift baskets, fruit, and flowers.

GiftTree was founded in 1997 by Craig Bowen and his wife, Esther Diez. Originally based in Key West, Florida, the company was moved to Vancouver, Washington in 1998.

== History ==
In 1997, Craig Bowen and his wife, Esther Diez launched an online gift business, which they started from their apartment in Key West, Florida in 1997.

In 1997, Yahoo! gave GiftTree the opportunity to be the "featured merchant" during the holidays. This generated publicity and backing from other websites. GiftTree was moved to Vancouver, Washington in 1998.

Bowen and Diez planned to sell GiftTree during the dot-com boom, but their profits allowed them to continue owning the company. Since 2001, the company has received a yearly profit. In 2005, GiftTree had thirty-five employees; by 2007, the company expanded the number off employees to sixty. During the holidays, GiftTree employs an additional 80 people. Martin McClanan, former C.E.O. of Red Envelope, became C.E.O. in 2015.

== Revenue ==
In 2007, GiftTree, on average, received 17,000 gift orders every month. In 2004, they received half of this amount. The company's 2007 revenue was $20 million.
