= Books4cars =

American company

Coordinates: 47.5584°N 122.2860°W

- Company type: Corp.
- Industry: Rare, new and used automotive and motorcycle books
- Founded: 1997
- Founder: Alex Voss
- Headquarters: Seattle, Washington
- Area served: global, via web; Seattle, Washingtonarea via storefront
- Services: Online shopping, book search
- Owner: Alex Voss
- Website: books4cars.com

Books4cars is a web-based company in Seattle, Washington, that carries used and rare books related to cars, trucks and motorcycles, such as service manuals, owners manuals and historical books.

== History ==
The business was started in 1997 in Detroit, Michigan, from a home collection of books by automotive engineer and mechanic Alex Voss. Books4cars relocated to Seattle's Columbia City neighborhood in 2000.

== See also ==
- Book collecting
