= Rosauers Supermarkets =

American supermarket chain

Rosauers Supermarkets, Inc.
- Type: Subsidiary
- Industry: Retail
- Founded: 1934, 92 years ago
- Founder: J. Merton Rosauer (1914–1990)
- Headquarters: 1815 W Garland Ave, Spokane, Washington, U.S.
- Number of locations: 23 (in 2023)
- Area served: Washington; Idaho; Montana; Oregon
- Key people: Cliff Rigsbee (President, CEO)
- Products: Bakery, dairy, deli, frozen foods, grocery, meat, pharmacy, produce, seafood, snacks, liquor
- Number of employees: 2,100 (2011)
- Parent: URM Stores
- Divisions: Super 1 Foods; Huckleberry's Natural Market
- Website: rosauers.com

Rosauers Supermarkets, Inc. is a regional chain of supermarkets in the Western United States, based in Spokane, Washington. Founded in 1934 by J. Merton Rosauer, Rosauers was sold in 1984 to Spokane-based URM Stores, and it eventually grew to 23 stores under the Huckleberry's Natural Market, Rosauers, and Super 1 Foods brands. Its stores are located in Washington, Idaho, Montana, and Oregon.

== History ==
In 1934, 20-year-old J. Merton Rosauer (1914–1990) purchased a small grocery store in Spokane, Washington, after obtaining a $1,000 loan from his parents. His father, Joseph P. Rosauer (1888–1961), owned two grocery stores in Spokane on East Sprague and in Parkwater, where Merton and younger brother Roswell worked. By 1938, Mert Rosauer sold his first store and invested in another grocery store. After selling off his second store, Rosauer opened his and Spokane's first supermarket in 1949.

In 1984, prior to retiring, Rosauer sold the company to URM Stores, a grocery supplier based in Spokane. By June 1986, Rosauers was operating 25 stores in four U.S. states with about 1,500 employees.

In September 1989, the Board of Directors for URM Stores made the decision to sell off the Rosauers chain. URM Stores agreed to sell 15 of the 24 Rosauers stores through an employee stock ownership plan in February 1990.

On April 10, 1990, Spokane employees of Rosauers voted to accept amendments to their labor contracts that would allow the employee purchase of the company. With 425 of the 700 eligible employees voting, the final count was 377 for and 48 against the company's sale. The sale was completed on July 27, 1990, with the company's 1,250 employees receiving ownership of 15 supermarkets, one freestanding pharmacy, an ice cream plant, and the corporate office building.

In November 1993, Rosauers was assessed $50,450 in civil fines for violating federal child labor laws at eight of its Spokane-area stores. Rosauers president Larry Geller said most of the violations involved one or two hours over the 18-hour weekly limit set for employees under age 16.

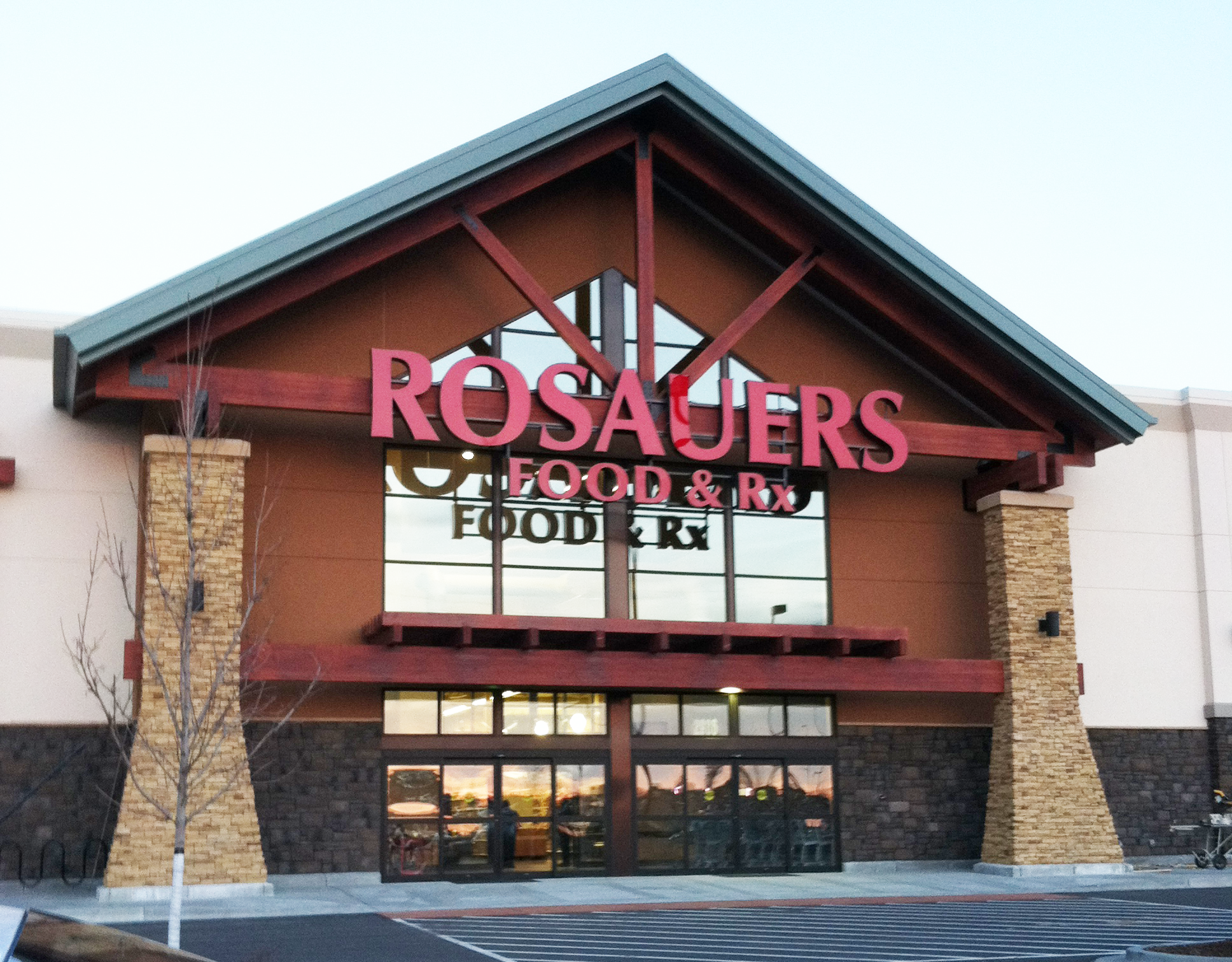
Rosauers store in Meridian, Idaho (closed in 2017)

On June 13, 2000, Rosauers announced URM Stores had completed the purchase of Rosauers after more than 1,800 of Rosauers' employees voted in favor of the sale. In June 2000, the company operated 19 stores in the Inland Northwest. Following the acquisition, URM Stores became the fourth-largest employer in Spokane County. Since the sale to URM, Rosauers has opened two more stores, in Yakima, Washington (2002) and Bozeman, Montana (2007).

In December 2008, Rosauers was forced to temporarily close its store on Francis Street in Spokane after 25,000 square feet (2,300 m^{2}) of the store's roof collapsed from record snowfall. Spokane fire officials said no one was trapped in the debris and only a minor injury to a Rosauers employee was reported. The damage estimate for the roof collapse at the Francis Street location topped $1 million.

In March 2011, Rosauers announced its plans to enter southern Idaho in 2012 with a store in the Boise area in Meridian. The Meridian store features a Huckleberry's Natural Market and a cooking school. Initially, Rosauers said additional stores were a possibility for the Treasure Valley if the Meridian store performs well, however, in October 2017, the chain announced the closure of the five-year-old store.

In March 2018, The City and Port of Ridgefield, Washington, issued a joint press release welcoming a new Rosauers location to the city, anticipated to open in the early 2019. The location would be the chain's first in western Washington. The store opened on December 7, 2019, after several months of delays due to poor weather and permitting issues.

Since April 2022, customers can shop through the delivery app, Instacart.

== Huckleberry's Natural Market ==
In 1996, Rosauers opened the first Huckleberry's Natural Market on Spokane's South Hill. After proving to be a success, Rosauers opened another Huckleberry's in Spokane Valley in December 1996. The Spokane Valley store was eventually closed while the South Hill store remains in business. Since 1996, Rosauers has added Huckleberry's Natural Market sections to its new and existing stores.
