= Natasha Esch =

Natasha Esch was the president of Wilhelmina Modeling Agency for five years from 1993. She is now an interior designer and the co-founder owner of a shop in Sag Harbor, New York. Since 2010, she has lived in the Hamptons and Park City, Utah, with her husband, Matt Coffin, and their daughter and son.

== Early life ==
Esch was born in Canada, grew up in Germany, attended a boarding school in Switzerland and studied business at Babson College in the USA.

== Wilhelmina Modeling Agency ==
After graduating, at age 21, her father, Horst-Dieter Esch, a German businessman with interests in the construction industry made her president of the modeling agency Wilhelmina Models that he had purchased in 1989 for around 4 million dollars. Over a five-year period, Esch oversaw management of this worldwide $20 million operation with subsidiaries in Los Angeles, Miami, Paris, Munich and Hamburg. Esch wrote the Wilhelmina Guide to Modeling, Wilhelmina's Modeling & Acting Dictionary and Wilhelmina's World of Child Modeling.

== Natasha Esch Design Interiors ==
In 1997, Esch moved to the West Coast where she started her own Los Angeles-based interior design firm, Natasha Esch Design Interiors in 1999. She has bought, developed and sold six high-end residential homes located in the Hamptons, West Hollywood, Bel Air and Malibu, California. Her designs were featured in Elle Décor, House Beautiful, House & Garden and Los Angeles Times Magazine. She was also featured in the book Style and Substance: The Best of Elle Decor.

== MONC XIII ==
In 2010, Esch and her family moved to The Hamptons where, in 2012, she opened MONC XIII, a retail store in Sag Harbor that sells goods for the home sourced from around the world.

MONC XIII has been featured in Goop, Remodelista, Martha Stewart Living, Elle Décor, Architectural Digest, Hamptons Cottages & Gardens, Dan's Hamptons, Hamptons Magazine and Dujour.
