= San Remo (company) =

Australian food company

- Type: Private
- Industry: Food
- Founded: 1936; 90 years ago
- Founder: Luigi Crotti
- Headquarters: Adelaide, Australia
- Area served: Worldwide
- Products: Pasta, pasta sauce
- Website: www.sanremo.com.au

San Remo, formerly San Remo Macaroni Company, is an Australian food company based in Adelaide, South Australia.

The company was founded in 1936 by Luigi Crotti, who migrated to Australia from Italy. It played a major part in making pasta a staple of the Australian diet, before expanding its horizons to overseas markets in the 1980s and adding Asian countries to its export destinations in the 21st century. By 2014 it was one of the largest privately owned Australian food manufacturing companies, with more than 50 per cent share of the market. In that year, still held by Crotti family, the company was inducted into the Family Business Australia Hall of Fame.

In addition to making pasta, in the 1990s it began growing durum in South Australia for the first time, to make a quality product and to help expand the market.

In 2008 it acquired Balfours, allowing the bakery to survive and retain its 400 jobs.

San Remo has branches in all of the other Australian states as well as New Zealand. It produces a range of pasta made of durum wheat, and exports products to about 35 countries, including Italy. The company is based in Windsor Gardens.
