= Eash =

Eash is a surname, being an Americanized form of the Swiss German surnames Esch, a habitational surname meaning "ash", and Isch, meaning "iron". Notable people with the surname include:

- George Eash (1911–1980), American inventor
- Norm Eash (born c. 1953), American football coach

== See also ==
- Esch (surname)
