= Pacific Institute of Culinary Arts =

Educational institution in Vancouver, British Columbia

- Type: Private
- Established: 1996
- Other students: Diploma
- Location: Vancouver, British Columbia, Canada
- Website: www.picachef.com

Pacific Institute of Culinary Arts, founded in 1996, is a privately run culinary school located at the entrance of Granville Island in Vancouver, British Columbia. The school is fully accredited by the Private Career Training Institutions Agency of British Columbia until 2014.

== Diploma programs ==
The Pacific Institute of Culinary Arts offers diplomas both in Culinary Arts and Pastry Arts; each full-time program runs for 6 months. Classes are held 5 days a week, running approximately 7 hours per day for a total of 917 hours. Four sessions per year are offered, starting in September, January, March and June. The classes are 90% hands-on, the chef-student ratio is 1:15 for Culinary Arts and 1:12 for Pastry Arts. All chef instructors are European-trained and have at least 10 years experience.

As of September 2010, approximately 2000 students, from Canada and other nations, have graduated from both programs. Applicants do not need to have any prior kitchen experience, but a high school diploma and the ability to read, write and speak English is required. The programs are intended to give students a solid foundation of theoretical and practical training to improve their chances of success in the industry, but they should not expect to go from school directly to an Executive Chef position.

== Restaurant and bakeshop ==
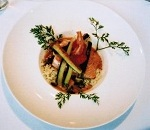
Entree made by Culinary Arts Students

The school has a restaurant, Bistro 101, and bakeshop, Bakery 101, on the premises. In 2009, 2010, the restaurant was awarded ‘Diners Choice’ by Open Table diners. Culinary students work in the kitchen and in the front of the house as wait staff, while the pastry students make bread and pastries for the restaurant and bakeshop.

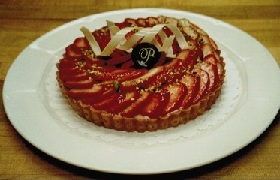
Dessert made by Baking & Pastry Arts Students

== School awards ==
- Consumers Choice Award - 2006, 2007, 2008, 2009, 2010
- The Georgia Straight "Best of Vancouver" - Cooking School - 2009
- Top Choice Award - 2008, 2009
