= Balfours =

Bakery in South Australia

- Type: Private
- Industry: Meat pies and Pie shops
- Founded: 1853; 173 years ago in Adelaide, Australia
- Founder: James Calder and Margaret née Balfour
- Headquarters: Australia
- Parent: Unique Homestyle Foods
- Website: balfours.com.au

Balfours is an Australian bakery which produces pies, pasties and cakes for sale in South Australia, Victoria, and New South Wales.

== History ==
Balfours began when Scottish immigrant James Calder and Margaret née Balfour opened a bakery at 130 Rundle Street, Adelaide in 1853. As Calder's bakery became very successful, he opened the City Steam Biscuit Factory in Twin Street, Adelaide in 1872. Balfours became a household name and in 1867, when Prince Alfred, the Duke of Edinburgh, visited South Australia, James Calder was made the official biscuit baker for the royal visit.

Around this time, Calder took on his nephew John Balfour and began trading as Calder & Balfour.

Margaret Balfour died on 1 November 1887 and James Calder died two years later on 1 October 1889, aged 71.

In the 1890s a new factory was built off Carrington Street.

From 1914 Balfours expanded their business to cake shops, cafes and tearooms. They acquired Jackman's Grand Cafe in the T&G Building in King William Street, and Balfour's Cafe was an Adelaide institution on this site for half a century.

In recognition of the significant contribution of then chairman, Charles Wauchope, the company was re-registered under the name Balfour Wauchope Pty Ltd.

In 2001, the state government provided funds to relocate the main production facility from Morphett Street to Dudley Park under a buy and lease back agreement. The company continued to struggle financially and faced imminent closure.

Balfours was acquired by the San Remo Macaroni Company in 2008.

Balfours was acquired by Unique Homestyle Foods in 2026.

As of 2018 Balfours have a second factory at Milperra in Sydney.

== See also ==
- Australian meat pie
- Frog cake
- Pasty
- South Australian food and drink
