= Hi-School Pharmacy =

Drugstone and hardware chain

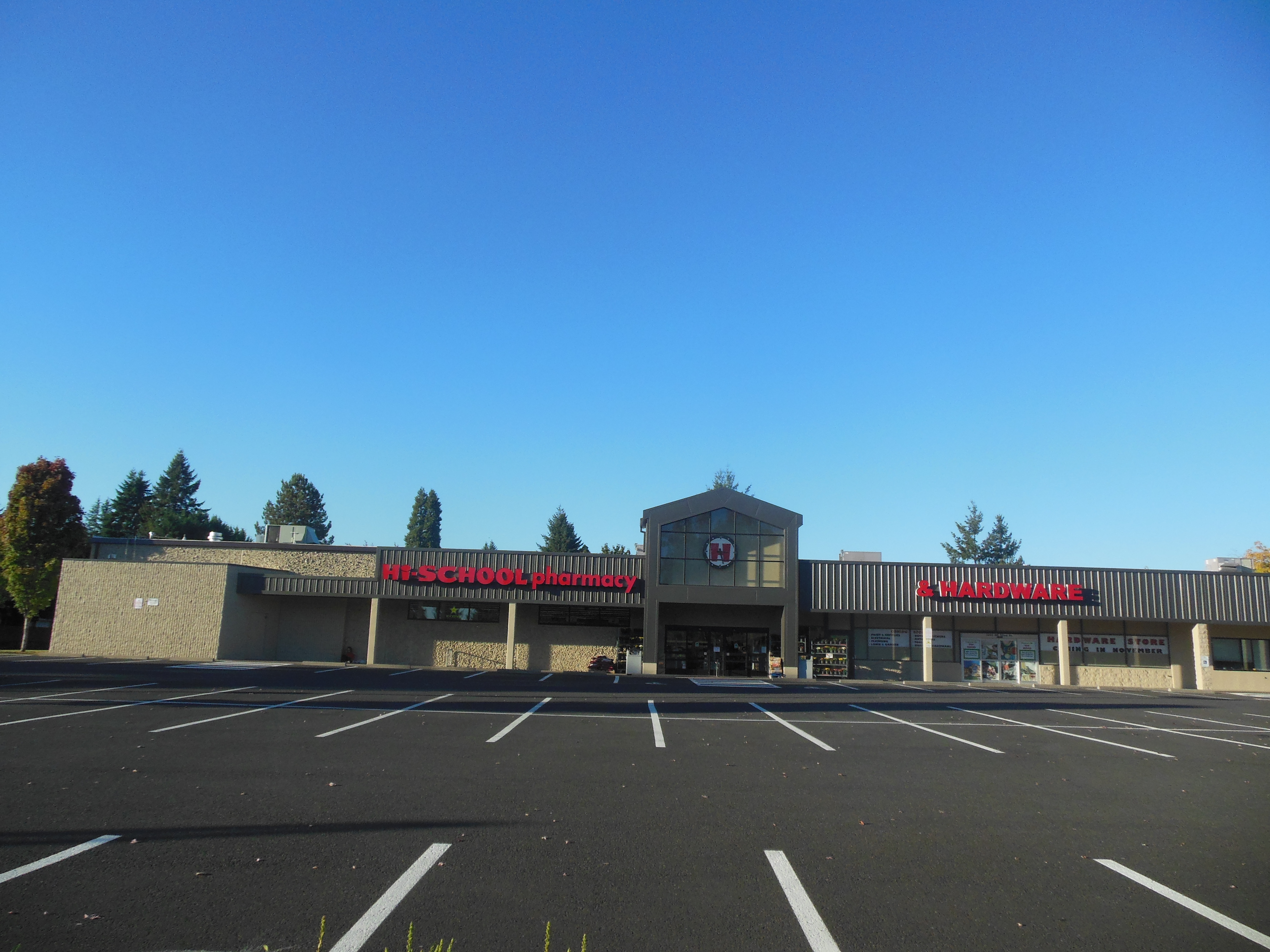
A combined pharmacy and hardware store in Vancouver, Washington

Hi-School Pharmacy Inc. is a chain of drugstores and hardware stores based in Vancouver, Washington, United States. It has 26 locations in the Pacific Northwest states of Oregon and Washington. Until a 2003 buyout by Walgreens, it was one of the largest pharmacy chains in the Pacific Northwest, with 42 stores.

== History ==
The High School Store was founded by Edith and Ira Nelson as a hardware store and named for the adjacent Vancouver High School on Main Street in Vancouver. The business was sold to Ken and Matt Zapp in 1939, who renamed it to Hi-School Pharmacy after adding a pharmacy. It expanded into an adjacent building—formerly a Safeway grocery store—and was sold to Val Mowan in 1948.

Mowan sold the Hi-School Pharmacy to Steve and Jan Oliva in 1967 and the building was expanded to 22,000 square feet (2,000 m^{2}). A second location opened in 1971 and within a decade the chain had grown to 11 stores. Hi-School remained a private company as it continued to grow through the 1990s; by 2003, it had 37 stores in Oregon and Washington and 650 employees. The company was the 31st largest drugstore chain in the United States by 2003, when it reached its peak of 42 stores in California, Oregon, and Washington. Its hardware stores were co-branded as True Value outlets.

In August 2003, the company sold all 11 of its stores in Clark County, Washington, to Walgreens and entered into a non-compete agreement. The Olivas retained space at the original location, which was among the sold stores, for a Hi-School Ace Hardware store. The chain returned to the Vancouver area in 2015 after the non-complete agreement had expired; the new pharmacy–hardware store in the Minnehaha neighborhood closed in 2024, leaving three Ace Hardware locations as their last in Clark County.
