= Gardein =

Line of foods by Conagra Brands

- Founded: 2003
- Founder: Yves Potvin
- Headquarters: Richmond, British Columbia, Canada
- Products: Animal meat-free foods
- Owner: Conagra Brands; Pinnacle Foods
- Website: Gardein official website

Gardein (a portmanteau of garden and protein) is a line of meat-free foods produced by Conagra Brands. In 2003, the company was founded by Yves Potvin, who remained as the CEO of Gardein until 2016. In November 2014, Pinnacle Foods purchased Gardein for $154 million. Pinnacle was acquired by Conagra in 2018.

The company has production facilities in Richmond, British Columbia and Hagerstown, Maryland. All of Gardein's products are vegan. The company uses a proprietary process to make its meatless products. In 2014, the company began producing gluten free meatless products.

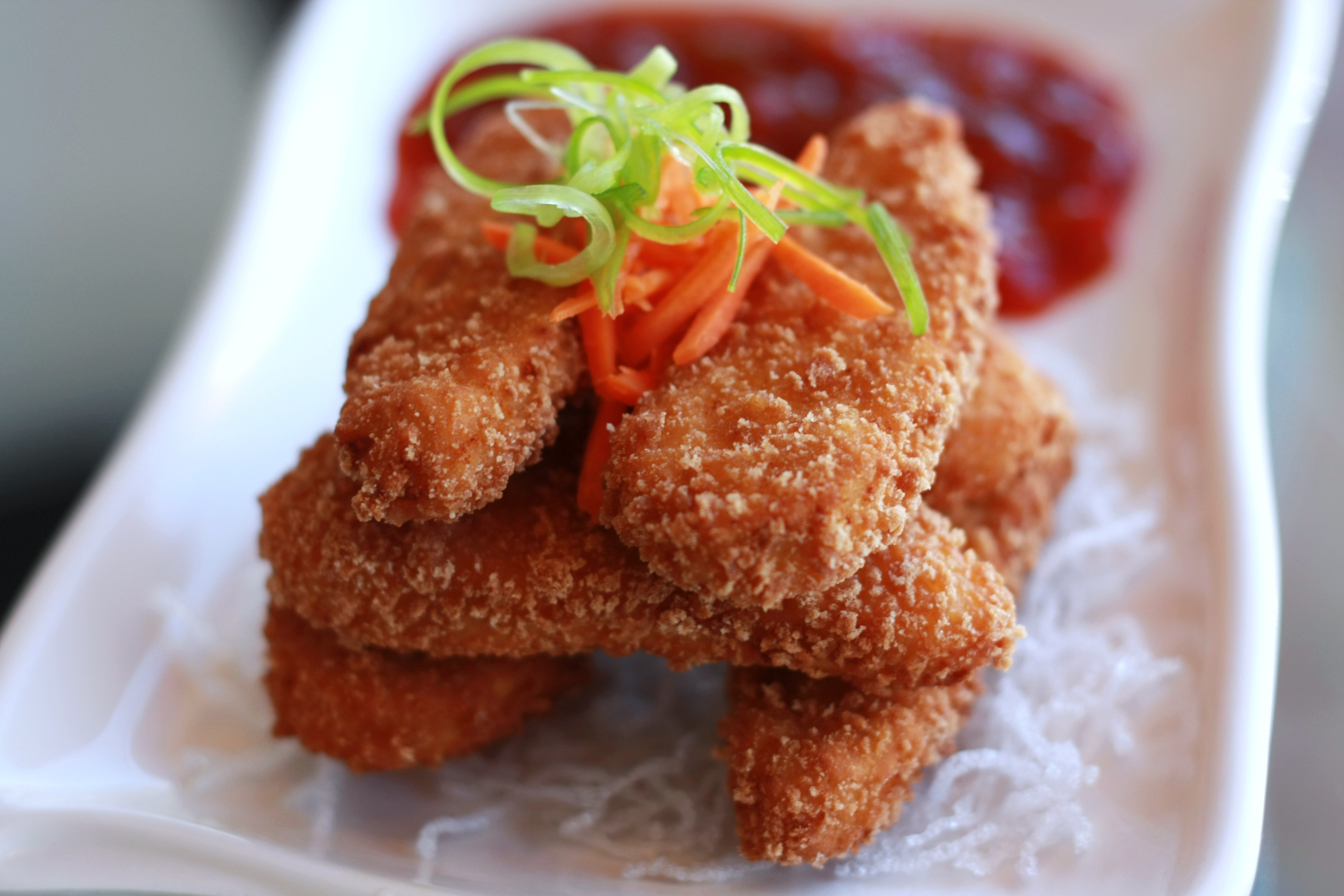
Gardein Crispy Tenders

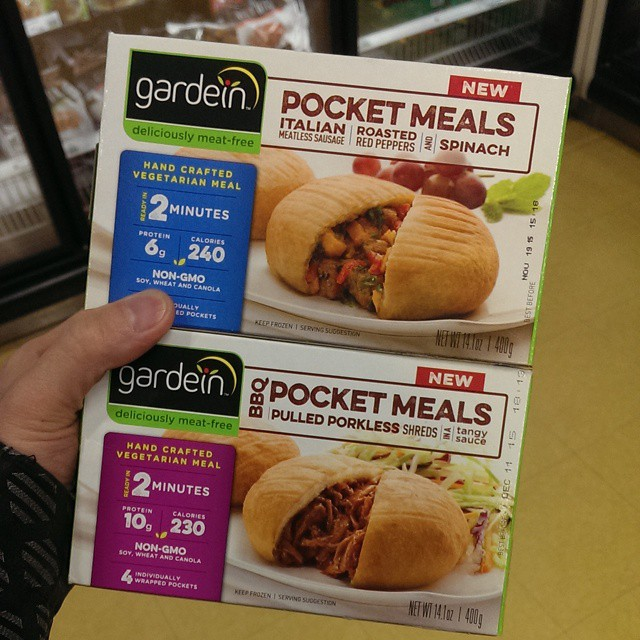
Gardein pocket meals in 2015

== History ==
Garden Protein International was founded by former chef Yves Potvin in 2003. In 2009, the company began selling its frozen products.

In 2007, Garden Protein had 85 employees and $50 million in annual sales. In 2014, it had nearly $100 million in sales at the retail level. By 2015, it had over 250 employees with distribution to more than 22,000 stores in North America.

Gardein was first used in the United Kingdom in 2008, as an ingredient in Grassington's frozen meals.

== Publicity ==
Gardein products have been featured on The Oprah Winfrey Show multiple times by chef and Gardein consultant Tal Ronnen.

In 2013, Gardein partnered with the Los Angeles City Council to celebrate Meatless Monday.

== Awards ==
In 2007, Gardein received PETA's Company of the Year Award for their meat substitute products.

Since 2010 Gardein has received four Canadian Grand Prix New Product awards (Frozen or Refrigerated Prepared Food & Entrees, 2013, Fishless Fillet and Crispy Chik'n with Veggies Pocket Meal, 2015). It also won a New Product award from Veg News Magazine three years in a row (2010, 2011 and 2012). Gardein's Seven Grain Crispy Tenders product won Shape magazine's Best Snack award in 2010, and Gardein then won the Good Food Award by Natural Health Magazine in 2011.

Gardein received several awards in 2014, including PETA's Product of the Year, the Libby Award for PETA's 'Best Seasonal Vegan Food,' the 'Foodie Award' by the Vegetarian Times, and the National Restaurant Association's Food and Beverage Innovations (FABI) Awards for their Fishless Fillets.

Also that year, the brand received the Leadership in Sustainability award at the British Columbia Export Awards, and Mercy for Animals awarded founder Yves Potvin their Innovative Business Award.

Better Homes and Gardens awarded Gardein with Best New Product in the Meatless Alternative category for their Crispy Chick'n Sliders in 2014, and 'Best New Product' in 2015.

In 2015, Gardein's Gluten-Free Beefless Ground was a finalist for Best Meat Replacement in Delicious Living Magazine's third annual Best Bite Awards. In the same year, they received the Progressive Grocer Category Advisor Award (Frozen Meatless Foods category) for their Fishless Fillets.

== Restaurant menu inclusion ==
Although Gardein is primarily sold as a frozen product in grocery stores, its products have been included on restaurant menus as well.

- Many of the faux meat options available at Veggie Grill restaurants are made from Gardein products.
- In 2017, hamburger chain Johnny Rockets added the Gardein black bean patty to its menu.
- In August 2019, New Zealand based burger chain BurgerFuel added the Chick’n patties to its menu.
- Starting in 2011, the Yard House restaurant chain has offered several Gardein products on its menu.

== Fine for dumping vegetable oil ==
In February 2018, Gardein pleaded guilty in the Provincial Court of British Columbia to a 2016 offence of unlawfully dumping vegetable oil into a ditch on Gardein's property that leads into the Fraser River. The company was fined $285,000, ordered to improve its Richmond-based plant to prevent future spills, and added to the Environmental Offenders Registry.

== See also ==
- List of meat substitutes
- List of vegetarian and vegan companies
- Veggie burger
- Vegetarian cuisine
