= Tim's Cascade Snacks =

U.S. snack brand

Logo

Tim's Cascade Snacks, a subsidiary of Utz Brands, is a manufacturer of potato chips and popcorn. The brands include Tim's Cascade Style Potato Chips, Hawaiian Brand Kettle Chips, and Erin's Gourmet Popcorn.

== History ==
The company was founded in 1986 by Tim Kennedy, and its production facilities are located in the U.S. state of Washington. Kennedy began by cooking chips in 100% peanut oil. The company was acquired by Pinnacle Foods in 2010. Conagra acquired Pinnacle's snack food brands in October 2018, and announced the company's sale to Utz Quality Foods LLC in September 2019.

== Products ==
Tim's potato chips, packaged in red-and-white-striped bags, were kettle-cooked in small batches until 2019. Tim's sales are most prominent in the Pacific Northwest, but are also distributed throughout the United States and some parts of Asia.

In 2018, two consumers sued Conagra Foods, then the owner of the Tim's Cascade brand, because its "Hawaiian" themed products were made in Washington, not in Hawaii, and not with Hawaiian ingredients. The products at issue were Hawaiian Kettle Style Potato Chips, Hawaiian Luau Barbeque Rings and Hawaiian Sweet Maui Onion Rings.
