= Eschelon Telecom =

American telecommunications firm

Eschelon Telecom Logo

Eschelon Telecom was an American telecommunications service provider based in Minneapolis, Minnesota. It operated in the states of Minnesota, Colorado, California, Nevada, Washington, Oregon, Arizona, Utah and Montana.

Eschelon was founded in 1996 by its chairman, Cliff Williams, as Advanced Telecommunications, Inc., a holding company for telecommunications businesses. In April 2000, these businesses were unified under the single name of Eschelon Telecom, Inc.

In March 2007, Integra Telecom signed a definitive agreement to purchase Eschelon for $710 million in cash and debt repayment.
