= Qliance =

Qliance Medical Group was a direct primary care healthcare business based in Seattle, Washington, USA. It was launched in 2007.

Qliance announced its closing on May 15, 2017. Qliance co-founder and CEO Erika Bliss told GeekWire that the company's shutdown was caused by a lender making an "unauthorized withdrawal" of about $200,000 from the company's bank account.
