= Pinnacle Foods =

Packaged foods company

Pinnacle Foods, Inc.
- Type: Subsidiary
- Industry: Food
- Founded: 1998; 28 years ago (as Vlasic Foods International)
- Fate: Acquired by Conagra Brands
- Headquarters: Parsippany, New Jersey, U.S.
- Key people: Roger Deromedi (chairman); Mark A. Clouse (CEO); Craig Steenek (CFO)
- Products: Frozen food, condiments, baking mixes, packaged meat
- Brands: List: Armour Star; Aunt Jemima; Birds Eye; Celeste; Duncan Hines; Gardein; Hungry-Man; Lender's; Log Cabin; Mrs. Butterworth's; Tim's Cascade; Vlasic; Wish-Bone
- Revenue: ▲US$3.144 billion (2017)
- Number of employees: 4,900 (2017)
- Parent: Conagra Brands (2018–present)
- Website: pinnaclefoods.com

Pinnacle Foods, Inc., is a packaged foods company headquartered in Parsippany, New Jersey, that specializes in shelf-stable and frozen foods. The company became a subsidiary of Conagra Brands on October 26, 2018.

== History ==
The company was founded in 1998 as "Vlasic Foods International", acquiring the Swanson TV dinners, Open Pit, and Vlasic Pickles brands from the Campbell's. In 2001, Vlasic Foods International filed for Chapter 11 bankruptcy protection. Between 2001 and 2007, the spinoff of former Campbell Soup Company-branded food lines was owned by the Metropoulos Group, which named it Pinnacle Foods.

In 2007, Pinnacle Foods was acquired by the Blackstone Group, a New York City-based private-equity firm.

In 2013, Pinnacle Foods' Parsippany office was named Inc.'s "World's Coolest Office." That year, Pinnacle Foods had its initial public offering on the New York Stock Exchange, raising about $580 million for its owners, the private-equity Blackstone Group. Shares began trading under the ticker symbol PF on April 4 at the upper range of its offering, $20 per share, thereby valuing Pinnacle Foods with a market capitalization of $2.3 billion.

In May 2014, Hillshire Brands announced it was buying Pinnacle Foods for $4.23 billion in a cash and stock deal. Hillshire Brands' portfolio includes Jimmy Dean, Ball Park, and Sara Lee. On June 30, 2014, Blackstone Group announced that Pinnacle Foods had scrapped its sale to Hillshire Brands, which would allow Hillshire Brands to be acquired by Tyson Foods. Pinnacle was to receive a $163 million payment as part of the breakup from Hillshire, and also receive an expected $25 million in one-time costs connected to the ended sale intent.

In March 2016, CEO Robert Gamgort was announced to be leaving Pinnacle Foods to be the new CEO of Keurig Green Mountain. Mark A. Clouse, formerly of Mondelēz, succeeded Gamgort as CEO of the company.

In June 2018, Conagra announced it would acquire Pinnacle Foods for $8.1 billion. The sale was completed on October 26, 2018 and the company was delisted in the NYSE.

== Other acquisitions ==
In March 2004, Pinnacle Foods acquired Aurora Foods of St. Louis, Missouri. Two years later, it acquired the food business of the Dial Corporation, including the Armour Star canned-meats business.

In 2009, the Swanson brand was discontinued in the United States, but remained in use in Canada. That same year, Pinnacle Foods also acquired Birds Eye Foods, Inc. adding a mix of frozen and specialty brands to its portfolio.

In November 2014, Pinnacle Foods announced that it would acquire Garden Protein International, Inc., maker of Gardein, from founder Yves Potvin, for $154 million.

In November 2015, Pinnacle Foods announced that it would be acquiring Boulder Brands for around $710 million, as part of the company's strategy to expand its health-and-wellness services.

== Brands ==
=== Grocery ===
- Armour Star (acquired from the Dial Corporation in 2006)
- Appian Way Pizza Crust Mix (acquired from the Dial Corporation in 2006)
- Banner Sausage (acquired from The Dial Corporation in 2006)
- Bernstein's dressings
- Brooks beans and chili
- Cream Corn Starch (acquired from the Dial Corporation in 2006)
- Duncan Hines including Duncan Hines Comstock, Duncan Hines Wilderness (acquired from Procter & Gamble in 1997)
- Log Cabin Syrup (acquired from Kraft Foods)
- Milwaukee's Pickles
- Mrs. Butterworth's (acquired from Unilever)
- Nalley
- Open Pit barbecue sauce
- Smart Balance
- Vlasic
- Wish-Bone (acquired from Unilever in 2013)

=== Frozen ===
- Birds Eye including Birds Eye C&W and Birds Eye Voila!
- Celeste
- Hungry-Man frozen TV dinners (acquired from Campbell Soup Company)
- Lender's (acquired from Kraft Foods in 1999)
- Mrs. Paul's frozen fish products (acquired from Campbell Soup Company)
- Van de Kamp's frozen fish products

=== Boulder Brands ===
- Earth Balance
- EVOL
- Gardein
- Glutino
- Udi's

=== Specialty ===
- El Restaurante
- Erin's
- Hawaiian Kettle Style Potato Chips and Snack Rings
- Husman's
- Snyder of Berlin (no longer related to Snyder's of Hanover)
- Tim's Cascade Snacks

=== Former ===
==== Frozen ====
- Aunt Jemima frozen breakfast foods, produced continuously under license from Quaker Oats beginning in 1996 under Aurora Foods until discontinuation of the entire lineup in 2017 soon after a voluntary product recall over potential Listeria contamination.
