= Frog cake =

Type of cake from South Australia

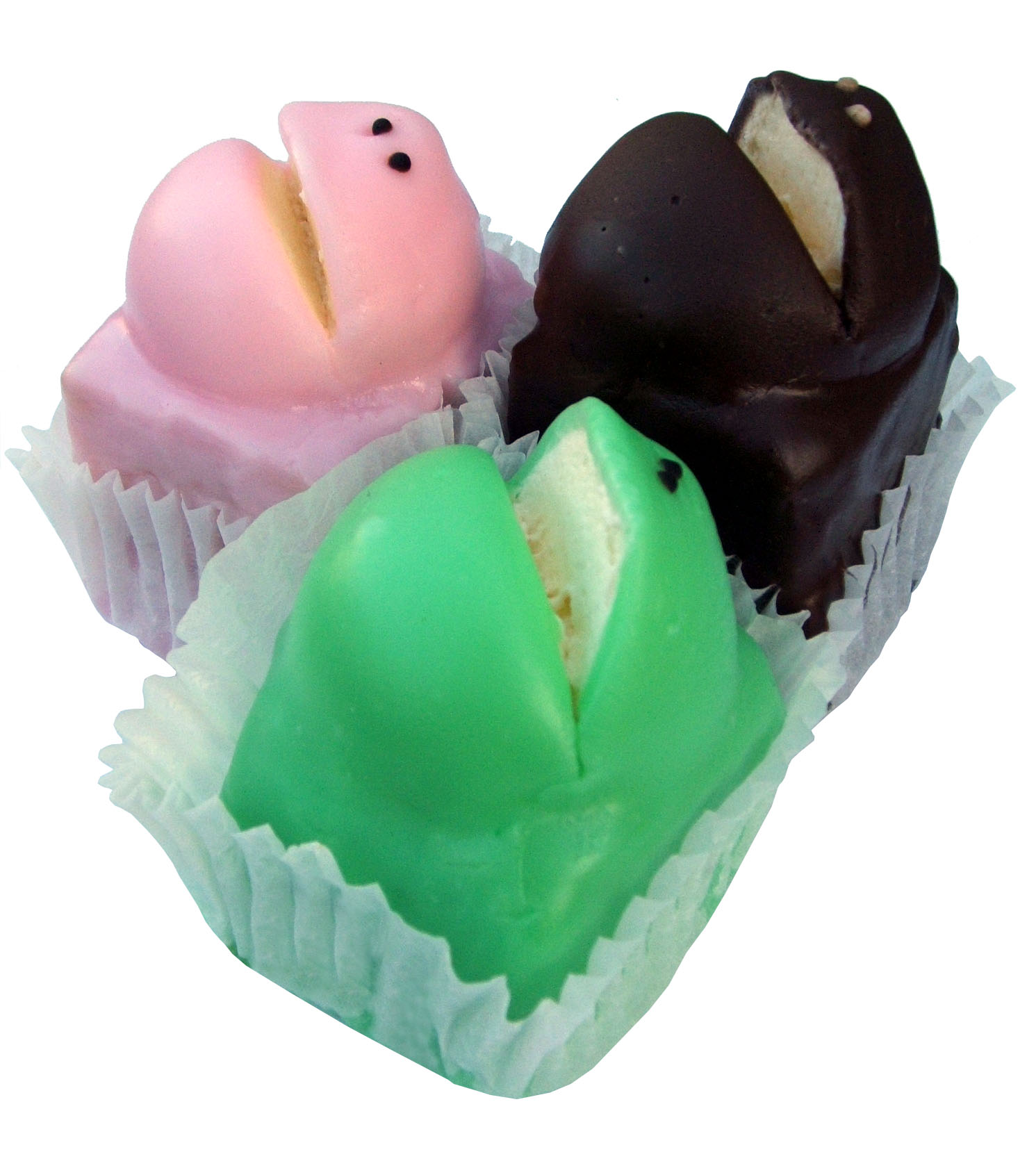
- Brown, pink and green frog cakes
- Course: Dessert
- Place of origin: Australia
- Region or state: South Australia
- Invented: c. 1923; 103 years ago
- Main ingredients: Sponge cake, jam, cream, fondant

The frog cake is an Australian dessert in the shape of a frog's head, composed of sponge cake and cream covered with fondant. It was created by the Balfours bakery around 1923, and soon became a popular treat in South Australia. Originally frog cakes were available exclusively in green, but later brown and pink were added to the range. Since then other variations have been developed, including seasonal varieties (such as snowmen and Easter "chicks").

The frog cake has been called "uniquely South Australian", and has been employed in promoting the state. In recognition of its cultural significance, in 2001 the frog cake was listed as a South Australian Heritage Icon by the National Trust of South Australia.

== History ==
Balfours does not attribute the invention of the cake to any single person or year. They speculate that John Gordon Balfour may have been inspired by fondant-covered petit fours on a visit to Paris in 1923. The frog cake was one of many fondant-based "assorted fancies" introduced at a time in which tearooms were still popular in Adelaide. It soon became known as the Balfours mascot, and has traditionally only been sold in South Australia, although they are now sold in Victoria, New South Wales and Queensland as well.

The original frog cakes were green in colour, and green remains the most popular of the options, but chocolate and pink coloured versions were later added to the range. In addition, while the frog motif dominates, special occasions have resulted in slightly different designs – such as Father Christmas and Snowman cakes released during Christmas seasons and "Chick" cakes around Easter. Frog cakes have also been released in the colours of the Adelaide Football Club.

Historically, the frog cake has sold well for Balfours, and at times sales have peaked in response to events surrounding the company. When the company was placed into receivership in 2000, a column in The Advertiser by Rex Jory called for people to support the company by purchasing the cakes, and in response sales doubled to an "all-time high". The 2001 inclusion of the frog cake as a South Australian icon saw a comparable increase in sales.

The success of the frog cake has led to imitations, and in response Balfours registered both the name and the shape of the product as a trademark in 2001.

== Composition ==
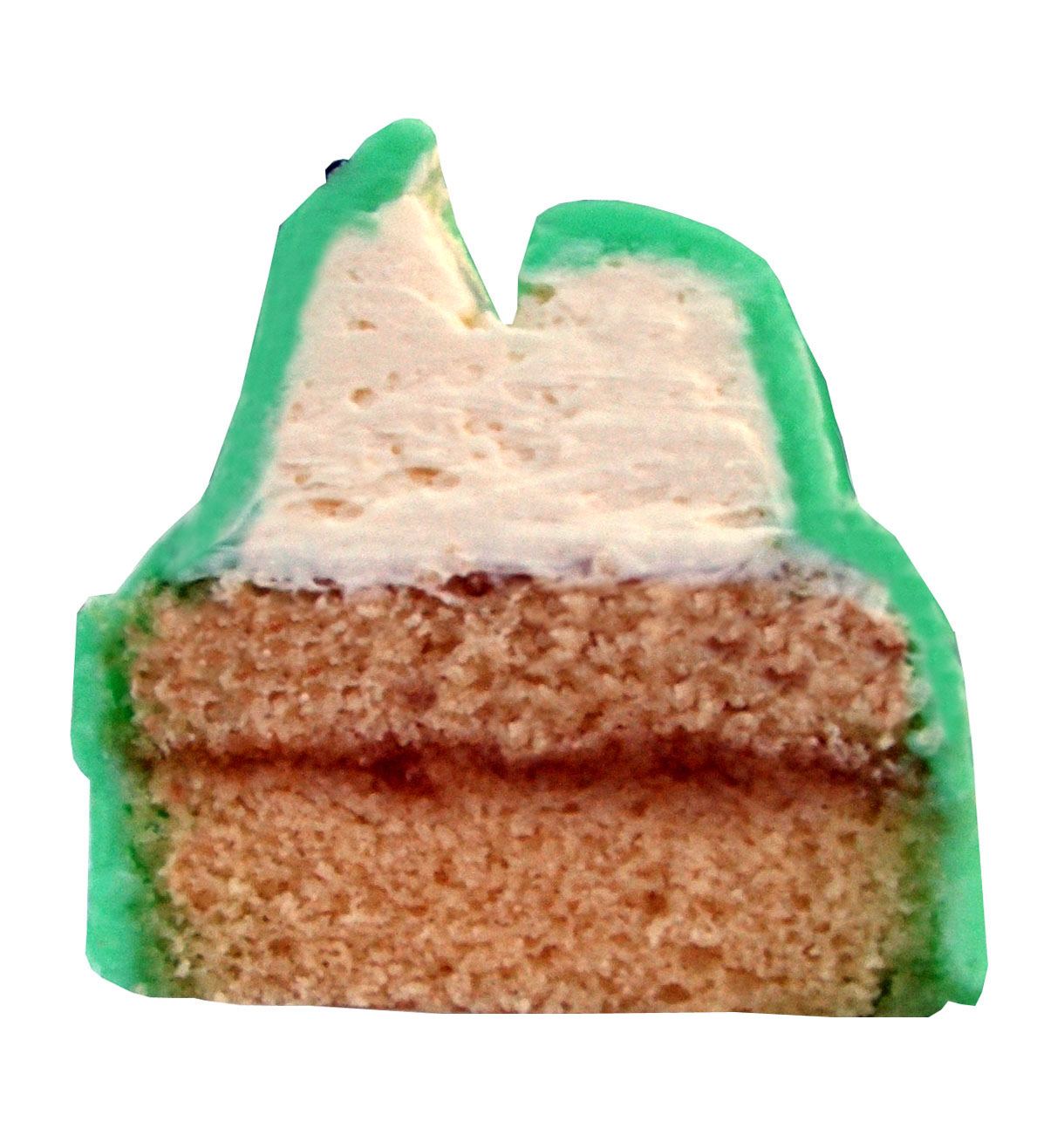
A cross-section of a frog cake, showing the internal structure

The frog cake is a small dessert shaped to resemble a frog with its mouth open, consisting of a sponge base with a jam centre, topped in artificial cream and covered with a thick layer of fondant icing. The recipe today remains identical to the one employed when the cake was first produced in the 1920s.

When manufactured, large layers of sponge cake are combined and cut mechanically into shape, covered in the fondant, and the mouth is then formed with a hot knife. Fondant eyes of a contrasting colour are manually added to the head, and the completed dessert is presented in a paper patty-pan. The fondant is normally brown, green or pink, but for special occasions colours can include variations such as red and yellow.

== Recognition as an icon ==
The frog cake has been called "uniquely South Australian", have long been regarded as a South Australian icon, and have at times been used to help promote the state. For example, in 2001 frog cakes were given to judges during Joan Hall's final pitch in a successful bid to win the 2007 World Police and Fire Games for Adelaide.

While there have been tongue-in-cheek and satirical suggestions to build monuments to the frog cake, such as that made by Peter Goers, a more serious recognition of the frog cake came in 2001 when it was one of the first items to be selected as a South Australian Icon by the National Trust of South Australia during the 165th anniversary of the state, adding the frog cake to the National Heritage Listing as a "movable asset".

== In popular culture ==
Frog cakes feature in the 2023 film Emotion Is Dead, written and directed by Pete Williams.

== Similar cakes ==
=== Denmark ===
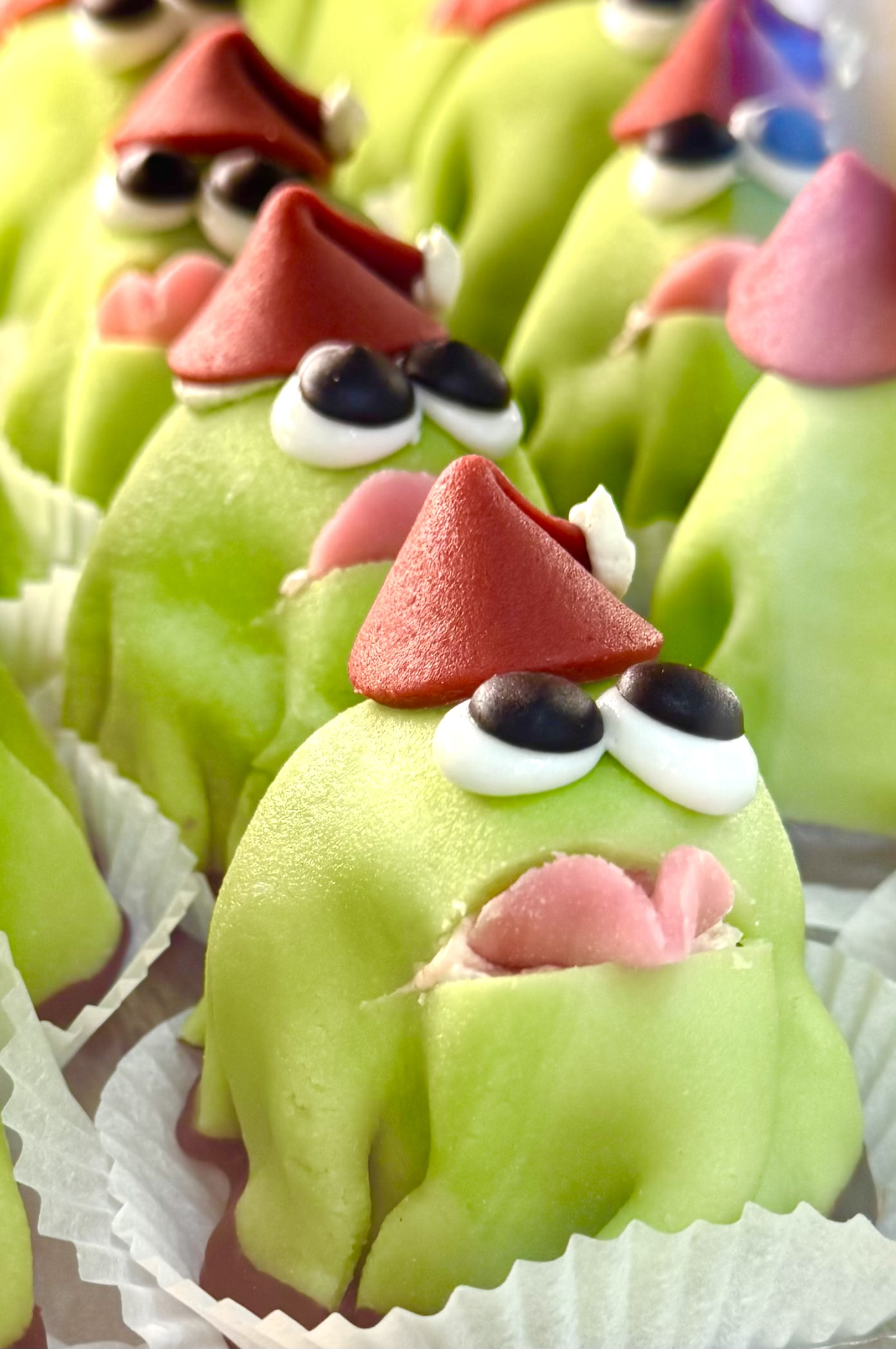
Danish kajkage

The Danish Frøkage ("frog cake") dates back to at least the 1950s. During the 1970s it became known as a Kajkage ("Kaj cake"), named after the character of Kaj the frog in the Danish children's television puppet show Kaj & Andrea. Visually similar to the Australian cake, it has a thin macaroon bottom instead of sponge, and is topped with green marzipan rather than fondant.

== See also ==
- List of cakes
- South Australian food and drink – Culinary traditions of Australia
- Princess cake – Traditional Swedish layer cake, a broadly similar Swedish dessert
