= Mofilm =

British content sourcing company

Mofilm Ltd
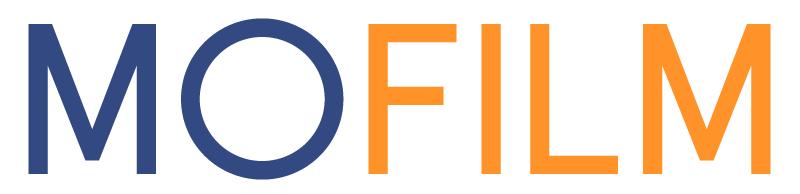
- Industry: Advertising
- Founded: October 10, 2007; 18 years ago
- Founder: Andy Baker; Ralph Cochrane; Jeffrey Merrihue
- Parent: The Brandtech Group Limited
- Website: mofilm.com

Mofilm Ltd (stylised in all caps) is a UK-based content sourcing company, which allows users to produce video and photographic content for various brands and social causes. The company was co-founded by Jeffrey Merrihue. Jon Landau is the Chairman of the MOFILM Advisory board.

The website has 50,000 filmmakers who can produce work with a number of companies, including, brands such as Pepsi and Chevrolet. In 2009, the company had Kevin Spacey as its host for the MOFILM Barcelona 2009 Awards. In 2013, it was ranked 43rd on Sunday Times Hiscox Tech Track 100 list.

== Overview ==
The company was incorporated on 10 October 2007 and is currently based in London, United Kingdom. The company also has additional bases in Los Angeles, Bangalore and Beijing. The company came about after an experimental competition at the Global System for Mobile Communication Association (GSMA) World Congress in 2007.

The company offers TV commercials, unbranded short films, sales support material and online content. The company states on its website that it aims to put corporate companies in touch with film-makers, reducing the overall cost and ensuring the projects remain creative.

The company focuses heavily on promoting itself through events and competitions.

== History ==
The company was founded by Andy Baker, Ralph Cochrane and Jeffrey Merrihue as a mechanic to deliver short-form video content that was purposed for mobile devices for the GSMA World Congress in 2007. The project was a success and resulted in interest in the potential for crowd sourcing as a mechanism to generate other types of rich media content – primarily for brands. Jeffrey Merrihue subsequently joined as chairman in July 2008 bringing his extensive marketing experience and contact list. Their 2009 GSMA World Congress event, hosted by Kevin Spacey. cemented the viability of the business model and in March 2009 Chris Noden joined as CTO to help the company deliver their first commercial project just a few months later.

In late 2010, a Kodak film created using MOFILM was screened in Times Square. The film was said to have exposure to 500,000 visitors daily.

In November 2010, the company launched their service MOFILMpro. The development using MOFILMpro, gave numerous filmmakers the opportunity to have their work screened on TV. MOFILM recruited the well-known film producer Jon Landau as Chairman of the MOFILM Advisory board in 2011. During the same year, it was announced that Hindustan Times, were one of the companies exclusively using MOFILM for outsourcing its creative video production. In 2011, Jesse Eisenberg joined MOFILM at the Cannes Lions Advertising festival.

A year later MOFILM are believed to be the first global contest to get a crowd-sourced spot on the Super Bowl in 2012 for Chevrolet. During 2012, the ad "The Salute", which was created for Chevrolet, won Nielsen's most effective car ad in 2012.

In 2013, the company was announced as part of the Sunday Times Tech Track 100 List. The company was listed in 43rd place. During the same year, it was announced that Coca-Cola would be premiering a MOFILM created ad during American Idol.

Later that year, MOFILM also received awards for their work with Cornetto, including winning Silver for best writing in the 2013 Lovie Awards in the internet video category. They also won an award for the most shared branded music video in 2013, for the pop star Yalin.

== Recognition ==
- Sunday Times – Hiscox Tech Track 100 (2013)
- Lovie Awards – Silver for Best Writing (2013)
- Unruly – Golden Cat (2013)
- Cornetto Cupidity of MOFILM won the Unilever Crafting Brands for Life, Creative Excellence Award (2nd year in a row)
- MOFILM's Chevrolet Oscars Programme production 'Speed Chaser' named Ad of the Day in Adweek magazine.
- Happy Grad (Chevrolet) lands 11th on USA Today AdMeter and 10th on AdBowl
- ‘The Salute’ (Chevrolet) won Nielsen Most Effective Auto Ad.
- MOFILM appointed as PlayStation's crowdsourcing agency on record – an industry first
- Cornetto Cupidity, Kismet Diner wins at Manhattan Film Festival
- ‘The Pitch’ (Mountain Dew) wins International Crowdsourced Excellence Award
- Cornetto Cupidity wins a silver lion for Branded Content & Entertainment and bronze lion.
- MOFILM's Chevrolet Oscars Programme production ‘Speed Chaser’ named Ad of the Day in Adweek magazine
- MOFILM production, ‘Love is in the Air’ (Coca-Cola) took #8 in Marketing Magazines most share romantic ads ever
- Cornetto Cupidity wins Best Branded Video Series Award.
