= Yoke's Fresh Market =

Grocery chain based in Washington, U.S.

Yoke's Fresh Markets
- Type: Employee-owned
- Industry: Retail (Grocery)
- Founded: 1946; 80 years ago
- Founder: Marshall Yoke; Harriet Yoke
- Headquarters: Spokane, Washington, United States
- Number of locations: 19 (2022)
- Area served: Washington; Idaho; Montana
- Key people: John Bole (CEO)
- Products: Bakery, dairy, deli, frozen foods, general grocery, meat, produce, seafood, snacks, liquor
- Revenue: ▲$202 million (2019)
- Number of employees: 1,054 (2019)
- Website: www.yokesfreshmarkets.com

Yoke's Fresh Market is an employee-owned Spokane, Washington-based chain of grocery stores founded in 1946 by Marshall and Harriet Yoke. The chain was established by their son Chuck in the 1960s and now encompasses 19 stores in Washington, Idaho, and Montana, primarily in the Spokane area. In 1990, Chuck sold the chain to the employees. John Bole currently directs company operations. In recent years, the chain has expanded into the southeastern portion of Washington, with stores in Pasco, Kennewick, West Richland, and Richland.

The Liberty Lake Yoke's opened their doors on March 2, 2016, at the old Safeway/Haggen location.

In September 2016, Yoke's Fresh Market expanded their stores total to 17 by acquiring Trading Company Stores locations in Cheney, Latah Creek (South Spokane), Spokane Valley, and Post Falls.

Yoke's announced that it would acquire both Missoula Fresh Market (formerly Safeway) in Missoula. The conversion happened in the fall of 2022, and now Yoke's has several Montana locations.

== History ==
Yoke's Fresh Market was founded in 1946 in Deer Park, Washington, by Marshall and Harriet Yoke.

In 1990, Chuck Yoke sold the chain of stores to the employees, thus forming an employee stock ownership plan.

== Locations ==
=== Spokane, Washington locations ===
- Airway Heights – 1151 S. Lyons
- Argonne – 9329 E. Montgomery Ave.
- Cheney – 4 Cheney-Spokane Rd (formerly Trading Company)
- Deer Park – 810 S. Main St.
- Indian Trail – 3321 W. Indian Trail Rd.
- Latah Creek – 4235 S. Cheney-Spokane Rd (west of US-195) (formerly Tidyman's and Trading Company)
- Liberty Lake – 1233 N. Liberty Lake Rd. (formerly Safeway and Haggen)
- Mead – 14202 N. Market St.
- North Foothills – 210 E. North Foothills Dr.
- Sprague & McDonald – 13014 E. Sprague Ave (formerly Tidyman's and Trading Company)
- Sprague – 15111 E. Sprague Ave. Store was closed in late 2010.
- Wellesley – 4507 W. Wellesley Ave. Store was closed in September 2007.

=== Washington: other locations ===
- Kennewick, Washington – 1410 W. 27th Ave.
- Pasco, Washington – 4905 Road 68
- West Richland, Washington – 1401 Bombing Range Rd.
- South Richland, Washington – 454 Keene Rd.

=== Idaho locations ===
- Kellogg, Idaho – 117 N. Hill St.
- Ponderay, Idaho – 212 Bonner Mall Way
- Post Falls, Idaho – 1501 E. Seltice Way (formerly Tidyman's and Trading Company)

=== Montana locations ===
- Missoula, Montana - 3801 S. Reserve St (opened in fall 2022) (formerly Safeway and Missoula Fresh Market)
- Missoula, Montana - 800 W. Broadway Ave (opened in fall 2022) (formerly Safeway and Missoula Fresh Market)
