= Ace Hardware =

American hardware cooperative

Ace Hardware Corporation

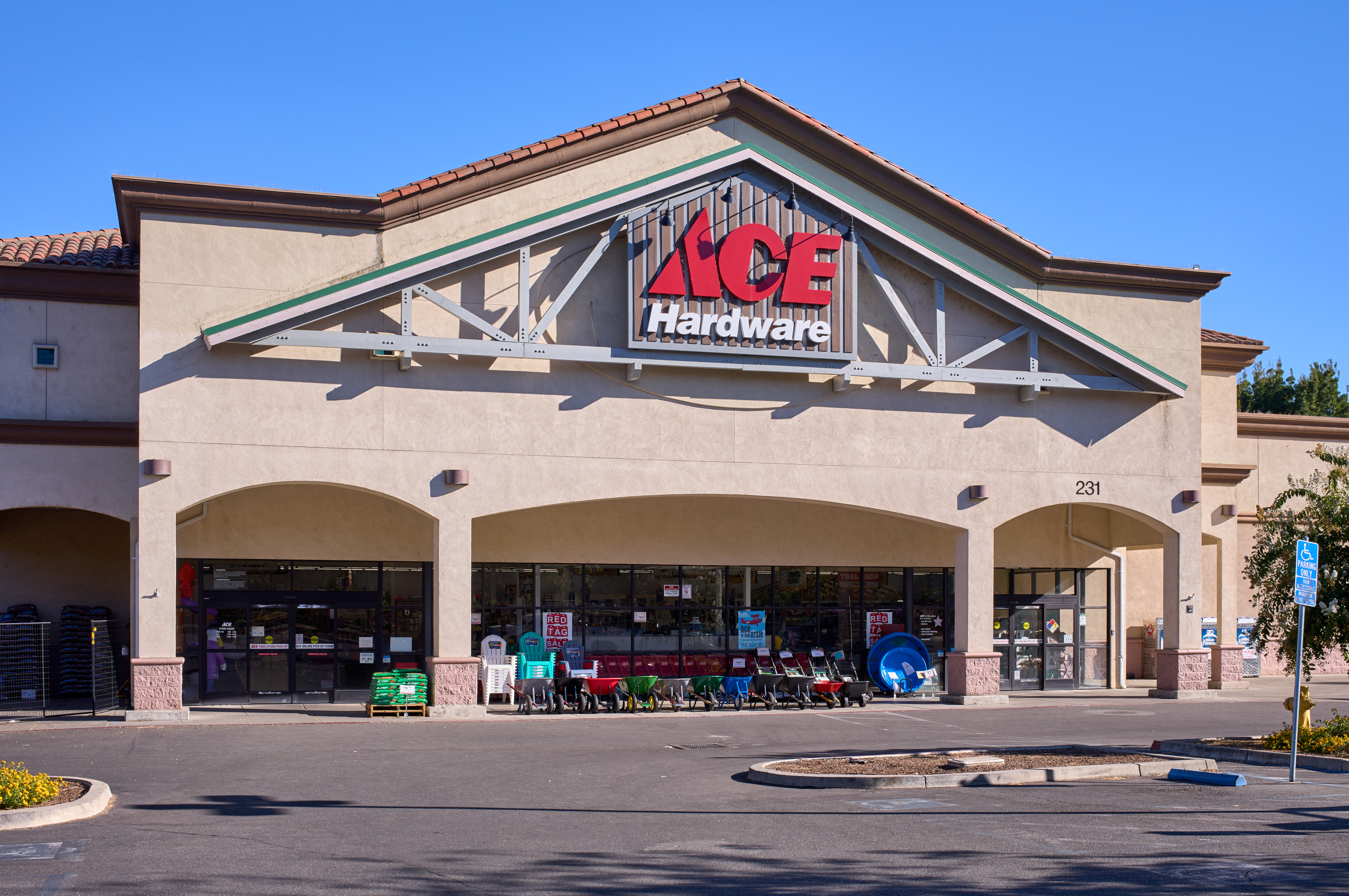
- Type: Privately held company retailers' cooperative
- Industry: Hardware stores
- Founded: Chicago, Illinois, U.S. (October 25, 1924; 101 years ago)
- Founders: Richard Hesse; E. Gunnard Lindquist; Frank Burke; Oscar Fisher; William Stauber
- Headquarters: Oak Brook, Illinois, US
- Number of locations: Over 5,700 (2022)
- Area served: International
- Key people: John Venhuizen (President and CEO); Steven Burggraf (chairman of the board)
- Revenue: ▲US$9.17 billion (2022)
- Operating income: ▲US$341 million (2022)
- Net income: ▲US$340.6 million (2022)
- Total assets: ▲US$3.491 billion (2022)
- Total equity: ▲US$891.8 million (2022)
- Number of employees: 12,500 (2022)
- Website: acehardware.com

Ace Hardware Corporation is an American hardware retailers' cooperative based in Oak Brook, Illinois, United States. It is the largest non-grocery retail cooperative in the United States.

Founded on October 25, 1924, as "Ace Stores", the company changed its name to "Ace Hardware Corporation" in 1931. It grew dramatically following World War II, more than tripling its sales between the late 1940s and 1959. After the retirement of longtime president and founder Richard Hesse in 1973, Ace was sold to its retailers, becoming a retailer-owned cooperative. It first reached $1 billion in wholesale sales in 1985 and $5 billion in 2015. As of 2019, it has over 5,200 locations in 60 countries. Ace operates 17 distribution centers in the United States, and additional distribution facilities in China, Panama, and the United Arab Emirates.

== History ==
In 1924, to increase buying power and profits, entrepreneurs Richard Hesse, E. Gunnard Lindquist, Frank Burke, and Oscar Fisher united their Chicago, Illinois, hardware stores into "Ace Stores". The company was named after the ace fighter pilots of World War I, who overcame all odds. Ace Stores was incorporated on March 2, 1928, and the company opened its first warehouse a year later. In 1931, the name was changed to Ace Hardware Corporation.

By 1933, Ace had thirty-eight retailers in Illinois, Indiana, and Wisconsin. In 1946, Ace introduced its Super Ace Store concept. By the end of the 1940s, Ace had wholesale sales of more than $7 million from the one hundred thirty-three stores it supplied. In 1954, the stores agreed to change their names from Ace Stores to Ace Hardware. By its 35th anniversary in 1959, the company had more than tripled this figure, with wholesale sales of $24.5 million from 325 stores.

In 1961, Ace relocated its warehouse and corporate offices to Bedford Park, Illinois. By the end of the decade, the company built warehouses in Northern California and Georgia to support its expansion into the Western and Southeastern states.

Founder and longtime president Richard Hesse retired in 1973. Ace relocated its corporate offices to Oak Brook, Illinois, the following year and opened a distribution center in Addison. The company was thereafter sold to its retailers and restructured as a cooperative. Independent retailers became the exclusive shareholders in the company and the corporate entity remained as a wholesaler and distributor. The strategy proved successful, and Ace surpassed $1 billion in wholesale sales for the first time in 1985; it went on to pass $5 billion in 2015.

Under CEO Roger Peterson (1986–1995), Ace sales more than doubled from $801M in 1983 to more than $2B in 1993. Needing more space to support its operations in the Midwest, Ace opened a 1.1 million–square-foot distribution center in Princeton, Illinois, in February to serve more than four hundred fifty stores. In October 1994, Ace launched a strategic plan known as "The New Age of Ace" with the objective, by 2000, to achieve improved retail performance, more efficient operations, international growth, and a faster pace for new store openings. The company reported a fifteen-percent jump in sales from 1993 to 1994.

In 1996, Ace surpassed Cotter & Company to become the largest hardware co-op. Ace overhauled its computer systems in 1999 to accommodate the introduction of the thirteen-digit barcode. In 2001, it passed TruServe to become the largest American hardware wholesaler. By 2002, the company had 5,100 stores. Ace surpassed $3 billion in annual hardline sales and $100 million in net profits in 2003.

In September 2011, Ace Hardware began selling a new line of premium paints, called Clark+Kensington. In 2012, the company opened a 336,000-square-foot (31,200 m^{2}) redistribution center in Suffolk, Virginia. Ace was the first tenant at the CenterPoint Intermodal Center. It acquired its largest member, Westlake Ace Hardware, for $88 million in December 2012. In January 2013, Ace announced a long-term deal under which Valspar agreed to acquire Ace's paint-manufacturing assets, including two facilities near Chicago, and produce the company's paints. In 2019, Benjamin Moore became the official manufacturer of Clark and Kensington paints. The following year, Ace's president and CEO John Venhuizen launched 20/20 Vision, a strategy to use network power to provide better customer service.

In 2014, the company opened a 450,000-square-foot (42,000 m^{2}) distribution center in Wilmer, Texas, and a 534,000-square-foot (49,600 m^{2}) retail support center in West Jefferson, Ohio. Both facilities were expanded in 2019. Ace launched its wholesale distribution network through the acquisition of the Portland, Maine–based Emery-Waterhouse in 2014 and the Spokane, Washington–based Jensen Distribution Services in 2015. Later that year, Ace expanded its wholesale operations coast to coast with the formation of Emery Jensen Distribution, LLC. This new distribution arm operates under Ace Wholesale Holdings LLC, a subsidiary of Ace Hardware Corporation, and is dedicated to serving non–Ace Hardware independent retailers.

In 2016, J. D. Power ranked Ace Hardware "Highest in Customer Satisfaction with Home Improvement Retail Stores" for the tenth consecutive year. In 2017, Ace announced a restructuring of its East Coast retail support network that closed facilities in Baltimore, Maine, Pennsylvania, and Virginia. Distribution operations were absorbed by a new retail support center in Fredericksburg, Pennsylvania, and the expansion of one in Wilton, New York. The company also expanded its facility in Suffolk, Virginia.

In July 2017, a 10,000-square-foot (930 m^{2}) customer care center was opened at Page Field in Fort Myers, Florida. In October, Ace acquired e-commerce marketplace The Grommet. However, the website was shut down in June 2022 and later sold to startup GiddyUp.

In May 2019, Ace acquired full ownership of ACO Inc., the company that operates fifty Great Lakes Ace Hardware stores in Ohio and Michigan.

In August 2022, grocery chain Food City opened its own Ace Hardware location in Piney Flats, Tennessee. In March 2023, Ace opened a 1.1 million–square-foot logistics center in Visalia, California. In June, the company announced it would build a 1.5 million–square-foot retail support center in Kansas City, Missouri. The facility is expected to be completed by mid-2025. In September 2023, the company opened its new headquarters, a 250,000-square-foot (23,000 m^{2}) campus in Oak Brook that previously housed the McDonald's corporate offices.

Ace Retail Holdings acquired Bishop Ace Hardware, a thirteen-store franchisee in central Illinois, in May 2024. The stores will remain open until they can be transitioned into new ownership. Ace opened its five thousandth domestic location in July 2024. In August, Ace unveiled ELEVATE^{3} Ace, an experimental store concept that elevates popular brands, with plans to begin rolling out the new stores in January 2025.

On September 9, 2025, Ace Hardware and DoorDash jointly announced their partnership to offer delivery at Ace's 4,000+ independently owned locations throughout the United States. This program will be exclusive via DoorDash's membership program DashPass.

== Home services ==
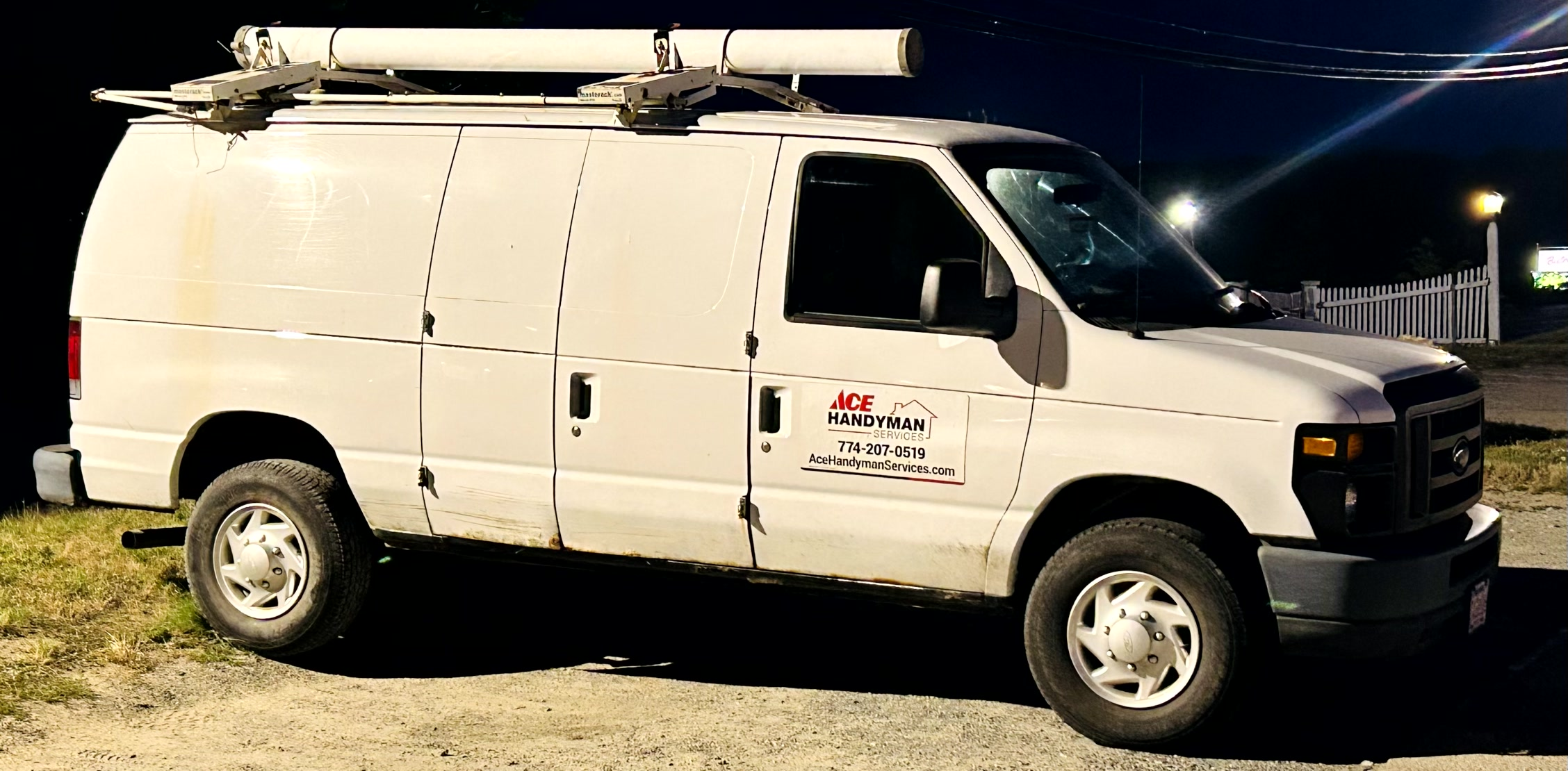
An Ace Handyman Services work van, illustrating Ace’s mobile service branding

In recent years, Ace Hardware has invested heavily in residential repair services once it saw younger customers shift away from DIY.

Ace announced the acquisition of the Handyman Matters franchise in September 2019, to combine retail and home services, tapping into the "Do-It-For-Me" home services market. The group's 57 franchisees would rebrand under the Ace Handyman Services name starting in March 2020. By 2022, Ace had over 200 franchisees with services available in all 50 states. The program's handymen are known as "Craftsmen" and are full-time employees rather than contractors.

In 2021, Ace Hardware Painting Services became a franchise operation under the Ace Handyman Services umbrella. The service emerged from Ace Handyman Services following its acquisition of Handyman Matters Franchise Corporation.

In December 2022, Ace acquired Texas-based Legacy Plumbing, its first licensed service offering. Legacy partnered with Westlake Ace to launch the Ace Hardware Plumbing Services location in Oklahoma City.

In June 2023, Ace acquired Unique Indoor Comfort's portfolio of 12 independent heating and air, plumbing, and electrical home services companies from Atlanta-based private equity firm Grove Mountain. In February 2024, Ace acquired Unique Indoor Comfort, an HVAC service company in the Boston area.

By June 2024, Ace Home Services had expanded to 400 locations across 48 states and 5,000 zip codes. In the same month, Ace acquired the North Carolina–based Minyard Plumbing.

== Advertising ==
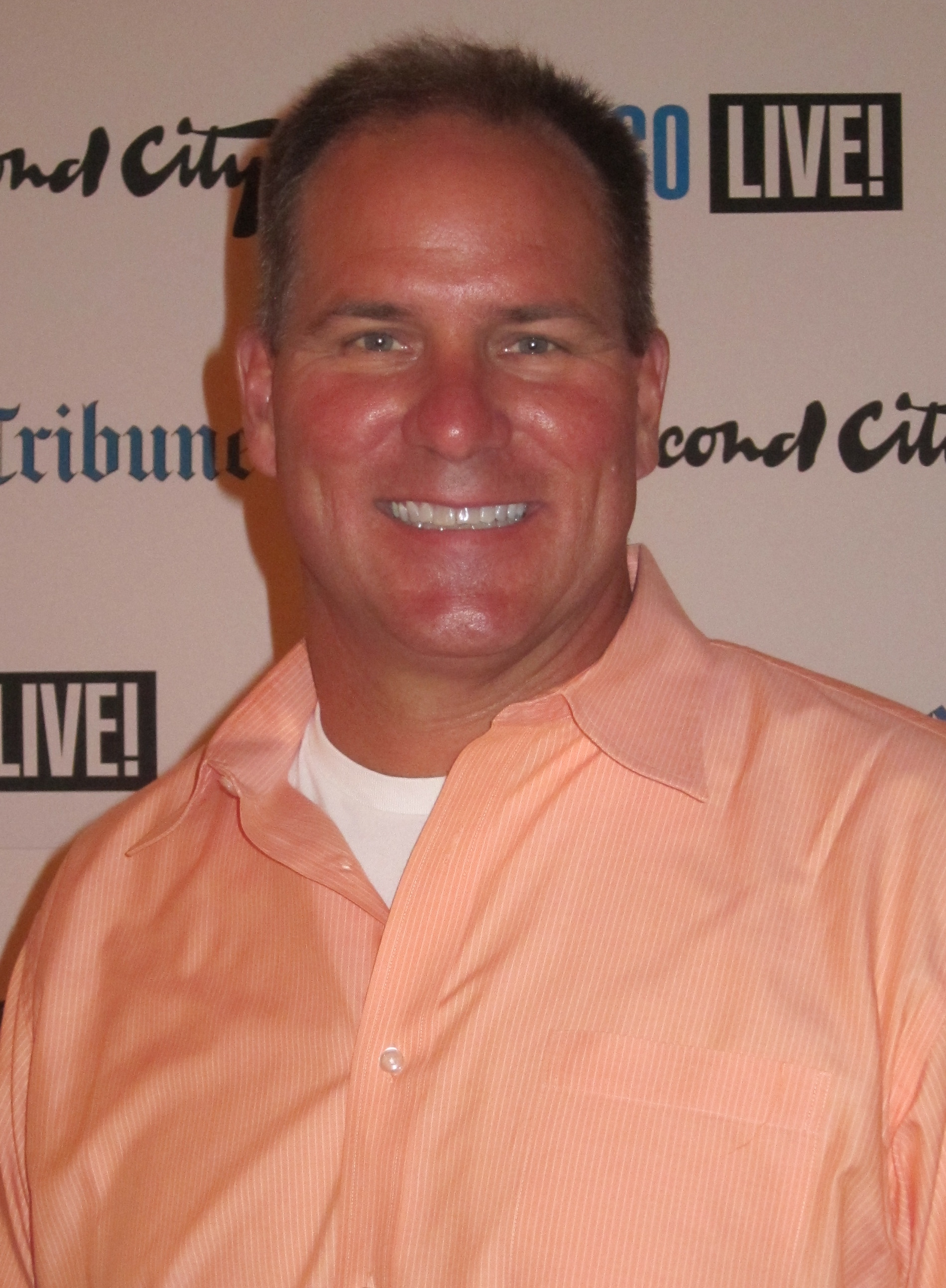
Lou Manfredini serves as Ace's "Helpful Hardware Man" and media spokesman.

In 1989, Ace's longtime jingle "Ace is the place with the helpful hardware man" was modified, replacing man with the more gender neutral folks. Celebrities Connie Stevens (from 1974 to 1978) and Suzanne Somers (from 1979 to 1982) starred in TV commercials for Ace Hardware. From 1987 to 2010, former NFL coach and NFL commentator John Madden also starred in Ace commercials.

In 1999, the American Society of Magazine Editors stripped This Old House magazine of an award nomination after it was deemed an Ace Hardware-branded insert was an inappropriate form of advertising. In 2002, home improvement expert Lou Manfredini was hired to serve as Ace's "Helpful Hardware Man" and media spokesman.

In 2016, Ace introduced a new series of commercials featuring associates addressing customers' needs, and a contextually-appropriate version of the Ace jingle (such as, after a customer asks for a lubricant they think is called 10W40, "Ace is the place for the stuff for squeaking hinges that's called WD-40. Not 10-W40, which is motor oil, that we also sell.")

== International operations ==
In July 1963, Ace opened its first international store in Guam. In 1990, Ace created a separate division known as Ace International. An international board committee was established in 1994. Over the years, Ace expanded throughout Asia, the Caribbean, Latin America, and the Middle East regions. By 2002, the company had stores in 70 countries and more than a hundred foreign suppliers.

=== North America ===
In 2010, Tim-Br Mart Group acquired licensing rights to the Ace brand name in Canada. By February 2012, Ace had 400 locations outside of the United States. Four years later, Rona, Inc., signed an agreement with Ace Hardware for the master license to the Ace brand in Canada. Lowe's completed its acquisition of Rona in May 2016. Rona assigned the Winnipeg office as Ace Canada, formally TruServ Canada, to manage the Ace Brand. As of June 2016, there were 62 Ace-branded stores in Canada. Beginning in 2017, Lowe's Distribution Center began to service Ace Canada retailers.

In March 2020, Peavey Mart acquired Ace Canada, as well as the master license and began to service the 107 Canadian locations. In June 2024, Peavey Industries announced it would end its relationship with Ace International and the Ace Canada dealers with the license ending at the end of the year. Ace International subsequently announced in October that it will no longer support or supply Ace Canada dealers in 2025.

In December 2021, Ace opened its first location in Mexico using its new turnkey franchise model.

=== Middle East ===
In 1991, Al-Futtaim Group obtained the licensing rights to bring the Ace name to Dubai. It opened a flagship store in 2006.

Ace came to Israel in 1993, starting with four stores. By 2005, the country had 25 Ace locations. In January 2006, Benny Gaon and Shlomo Zbeda bought Ace Israel, outbidding former owner Gad Zeevi. By 2007, the company announced plans to expand into Turkey and debuted its IPO on the Tel Aviv Stock Exchange. However, after a significant economic downturn, the company cancelled its expansion plans and cut 15% of its workforce in 2009. Ace Israel was eventually sold to Electra Consumer Products in 2012, and then Kedma Capital in 2016. By 2021, Ace Israel operated 34 stores and Kedma took the company public again.

In September 2013, Ace and Safi & Safi Enterprises announced plans to open a location in Afghanistan. The store would open in Mazar-e Sharif in 2014, with a distribution facility in Kabul.

=== Oceania ===
By 2002, Ace had six locations in Guam. In June 2014, Ace Hardware International announced an agreement to be a wholesale supplier for New Zealand's Mitre 10.

=== Asia ===
PT Ace Hardware brought the brand to Indonesia in 1995 and became a publicly traded company in 2007. By 2010, there were 39 stores in 18 cities. As of January 2023, there were 229 stores located in 56 cities throughout Indonesia. After 29 years, it was announced the Ace brand would leave the country on December 31, 2024, and the stores were rebranded to Azko from January 1, 2025. On July 29, 2026, Ace Hardware opened its first store in Indonesia again, this time under Mitra Adiperkasa, in Sunter Mall, North Jakarta.

Giant Ace SDN BHD brought Ace to Malaysia in 1996. By 2010, it had 10 stores in the Kuala Lumpur metropolitan area. Ace Hardware Malaysia currently has 22 branches nationwide as of January 1, 2022.

Ace Hardware Philippines Inc was founded in 1997, opening its first branch in the Philippines at SM Southmall in Metro Manila. Currently, Ace Hardware has more than 100 branches all over the country. Ace Hardware is an affiliate of the SM Group of Companies. In 2016, a viral Facebook joke event titled Suntukan sa Ace Hardware (lit. 'Fistfight at Ace Hardware') drew widespread online attention in the Philippines after tens of thousands of users indicated interest in a fictitious mass fistfight at an Ace branch in SM City Lucena; the company initially denied involvement but later acknowledged the meme through promotional social media posts. On the scheduled date, the store staged a mock activity at the location, allowing visitors to participate in photo opportunities rather than any actual altercation.

Ace signed licensing agreements in Taiwan in 1998, and Singapore, Japan, and Hong Kong in 2000.

Ace spent more than $300 million on products from China in 2006. The following year, the company opened its first outsourcing and storage facility in Shanghai and moved purchasing operations from Hong Kong.

Ace Hardware came to Maldives in 2011 through a partnership between the American company and Co-Load Maldives Pvt Ltd. The collaboration opened its third store in 2022. Alongside the Eugene Group, it attempted to expand into South Korea in 2018 but was blocked by the country's Ministry of SMEs and Startups. The company has since managed to add four locations in Seoul and Goyang. Ace expanded to Vietnam in November 2019, opening a store in Ho Chi Minh City.
