= Lou Manfredini =

American television host

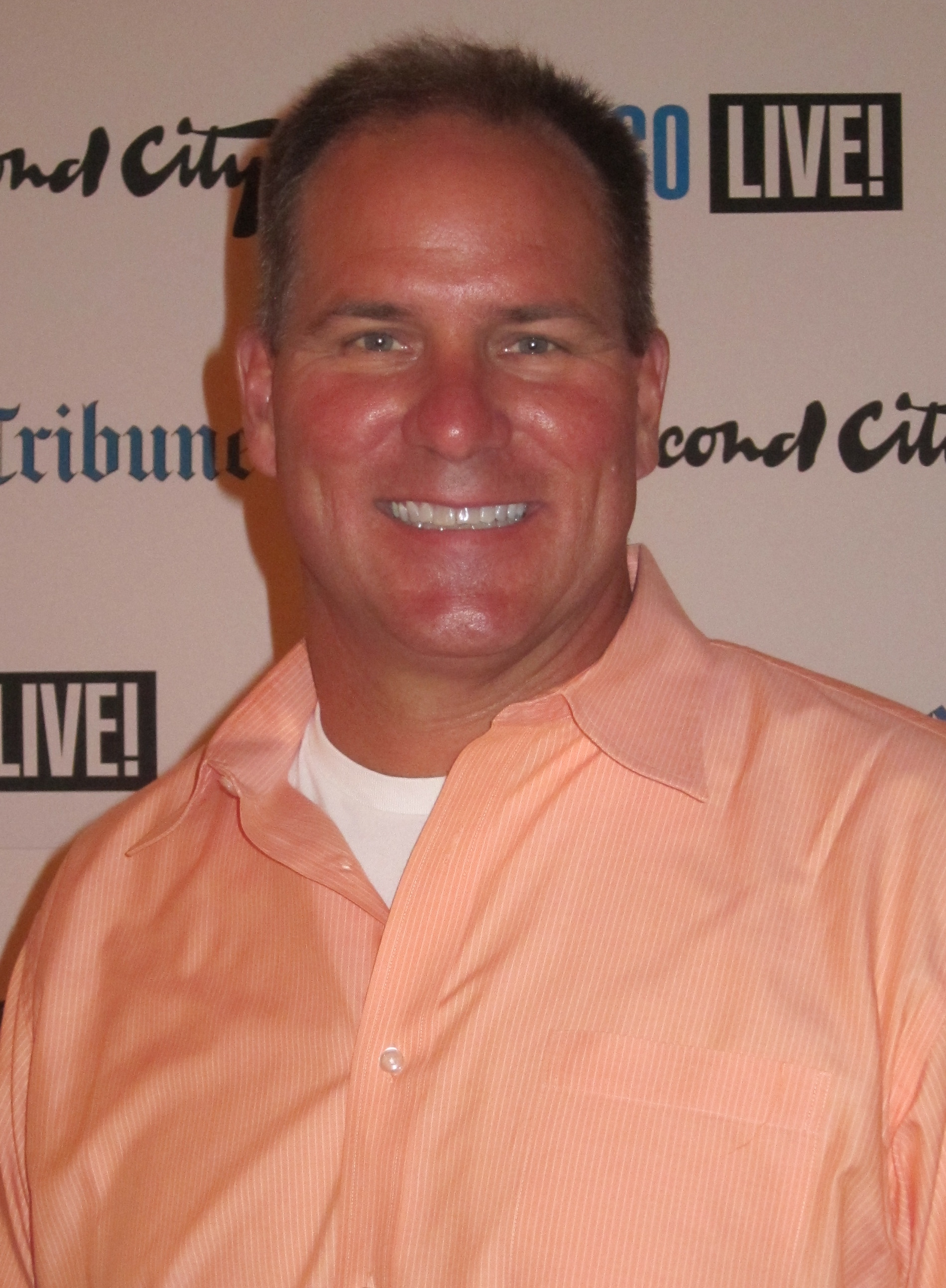
- Manfredini in 2011
- Born: May 4, 1964 (age 62); Highland Park, Illinois, United States
- Occupations: Television host Radio Personality
- Website: fixitenterprises.com

Lou Manfredini (born May 4, 1964) is an American television/radio personality and home improvement expert. Born in Highland Park, Illinois he is the host of HouseSmarts TV, host of Chicago's WGN (AM) HouseSmarts Radio (formerly Mr. Fix-It), and is a contributor on NBC's Today Show.

== Early years ==
Manfredini was born to Massimo and Lida Manfredini in Highland Park, IL. His father worked as an auto and truck mechanic, mother was a homemaker. Manfredini worked with his father on cars and trucks which ultimately led Manfredini to pursue a career in home improvement. While a student at Deerfield High School, Manfredini worked at a hardware store and at a steel company as a welder. After graduating high school in 1982, Manfredini went to Millikin University in Decatur, Illinois on a musical theater scholarship. In 1987, Manfredini started a construction company in Chicago. After 8 years in business, he began a media career in 1995 when WGN (AM) Radio launched his idea for a home improvement call-in radio show.

== Television and Print Media ==
=== As host ===
In 1995 after writing letters to pitch his idea for a call-in home improvement radio show on WGN Radio, morning show host Bob Collins booked Manfredini on his show as a guest where his nickname, Mr. Fix It, was coined. Soon after Manfredini joined host Roy Leonard on his Saturday show as a regular contributor which then led to his own Saturday morning call-in radio show which still airs today. In 2000, Manfredini became the home improvement contributor for NBC-TV's Today Show, from 2006 to 2013 for NBC-5 Chicago and in September 2013 for WGN-TV Chicago. In 2006, he partnered with Frank DiGioia, President and CEO of Fort Productions, to create the news/magazine style home improvement and lifestyle show HouseSmarts. Manfredini is also the host of Lou Manfredini's HouseSmarts Minutes (formerly Lou Manfredini's Home Improvement Minutes) that are syndicated on radio stations across the United States.

On May 29, 2015 Manfredini was inducted into the WGN Radio Walk of Fame.

On January 14, 2017 Manfredini debuted the live show, HouseSmarts Radio, on 77-WABC New York.

On October 14, 2017 Manfredini debuted the live show, HouseSmarts Radio, on 790-KABC Los Angeles.

=== As spokesperson ===
Manfredini has represented Marvin Windows and Doors nationally as their spokesperson since 2004 and serves/has served as spokesperson in the Chicago market for: Perma Seal Basement Systems, Chicagoland and Northwest Indiana Chevy Dealers and Baxter Credit Union (BCU).

Since 2002 Manfredini has served as Ace Hardware's resident "Home Expert" and editorial media spokesperson.

Manfredini has been host of satellite media tours representing companies such as The Wood Promotion Network, 3M, Marvin Windows and Doors, Ace Hardware, Skil Power Tools.

Manfredini has served as subject matter expert host for The Rug Doctor infomercial.

=== Other appearances ===
Manfredini has sung the National Anthem at Wrigley Field, home of the Chicago Cubs, three times – once in 1998, once in 2001 and once as a duet in 2009 with his producer, Lindsey Smithwick (formerly Kreutzer).

From 2002 to 2003 Manfredini served as the Home Category Expert for the Home Shopping Network (HSN).

On August 18, 2011 Manfredini was a guest on the stage and radio show created by the Chicago Tribune and The Second City, Chicago Live!

On May 30, 2012, Manfredini guest starred in the Irish musical The Twelve Tenors for one night at the Riverfront Theater in Chicago.

== Bibliography ==
- 2000: Mr. Fix It: 101 Answers to the Most Commonly Asked Questions About Repairing Your Home Rare Air Media ISBN 1-892866-22-6
- 2002: Mr. Fix It Introduces You To Your Home Ballantine Books ISBN 0-345-44987-8
- 2004: House Smarts Ballantine Books ISBN 0-345-44989-4
- 2004: Bath Smarts Ballantine Books ISBN 0-345-44990-8
- 2004: Kitchen Smarts Ballantine Books ISBN 0-345-44988-6
- 2004: Room Smarts Ballantine Books ISBN 0-345-46722-1

== Family ==
Manfredini lives in Chicago with his wife and four children and runs the Villa Park Ace Hardware, and previously ran the Edgebrook Ace Hardware.
