= The Grommet =

Online marketplace

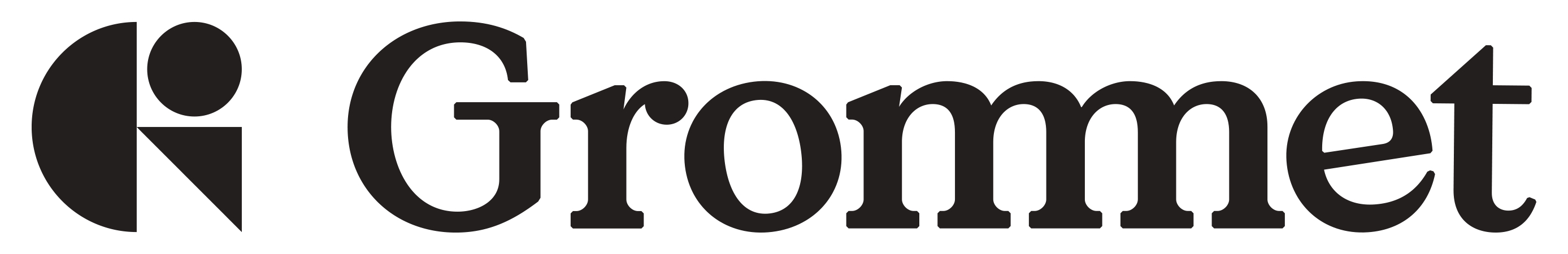
- Website type: E-commerce
- Owner: GiddyUp
- Creators: Jules Pieri, Joanne Domeniconi
- Website: thegrommet.com
- Commercial: Yes
- Launched: 2008; 18 years ago

Grommet (formerly The Grommet) is an online marketplace and product discovery platform for consumer products from maker culture, inventors, entrepreneurs, and small businesses. It was founded in 2008 by CEO Jules Pieri and Chief Discovery Officer Joanne Domeniconi after careers at Continuum, Keds, Playskool, and Stride Rite. They find and review products and select certain ones to be promoted on their website. They present a new product every weekday with an editorial and video story. Members of the website then give feedback on the product. Many of their products were initially funded on the crowdfunding platforms IndieGogo or Kickstarter. The Grommet sees itself as a next step after crowdfunding success to help new businesses get launched.

In June 2014, The Grommet Wholesale was launched at the first White House Maker Faire to distribute products to gift shops, museum stores, garden centers, supermarkets, and speciality retailers.

In October 2017, Ace Hardware acquired a majority stake in The Grommet.

In April 2019, Pieri's first book, "How We Make Stuff Now: Turn Ideas into Products That Build Successful Businesses" was published by McGraw-Hill Education.

In September 2022, GiddyUp acquired Grommet and relaunched it as a product discovery platform that empowers its shoppers to upvote products and buy directly from makers.

Since relaunching in 2022, Grommet has launched over 1,000 new products from small businesses.

== See also ==
- America's Greatest Makers
- Make (magazine)
- Quirky
- Scoutmob
- Shark Tank
- UncommonGoods
