= Paul Adams (American football coach) =

American football player and coach (1936–2019)

Biographical details
- Born: July 10, 1936; Waukegan, Illinois, U.S.
- Died: March 14, 2019 (aged 82); Illinois, U.S.

Playing career
- 1954–1957: Illinois
- Position: Tackle

Coaching career (HC unless noted)
- 1961–1966: Deerfield HS (IL) (assistant)
- 1967–1992: Deerfield HS (IL)

Head coaching record
- Overall: 220–56

Accomplishments and honors

Championships
- 1 IHSA (1975)

Awards
- Illinois High School Football Hall of Fame (1991)

Second Lieutenant Paul Adams
- Burial place: North Chicago, Illinois
- Military career
- Allegiance: United States
- Branch: United States Army
- Service years: 1957–1961
- Rank: Second Lieutenant

Paul A. Adams (July 10, 1936 – March 14, 2019) was an American football player and coach. He spent his entire coaching career at Deerfield High School in Deerfield, Illinois. In 1991, he was elected to the Illinois State High School Football Hall of Fame, and in 1992, the Waukegan Sports Hall of Fame. Upon his retirement, the Chicago Tribune described him as "legendary" and "king of the north suburbs".

== Early life ==
Adams was born in 1936, in Waukegan, Illinois. He attended and played football at Waukegan High School, and after graduating, attended University of Illinois, where he played football for the Fighting Illini as a tackle and roomed with future Green Bay Packers star Ray Nitschke. Upon graduating, he served in the United States Army until his discharge in 1961, having attained the rank of Second Lieutenant. He then briefly taught at Highland Park High School, before transferring to Deerfield, where he remained until his retirement.

== Coaching career ==
Adams was initially an assistant coach at Deerfield, under then head coach Doug Kay. He became head coach in 1967 after Kay left to become defensive coordinator at Indiana State University. During Adams' tenure, his teams suffered only one losing season, attained a lifetime record of 220-56, and were Illinois State Champions in 1975. DHS were State runners up in 1977, 1981, and 1984, and appeared in the Class 5A State playoffs a record 15 times. In 1976, he participated in the annual University of Michigan football clinic with then New York Jets coach Lou Holtz and Michigan coach Bo Schembechler. Adams and his assistants were noted for their inspiring speeches to their players, and their support for each other during times of crisis; when Adam's mother died in 1986, the entire team attended her funeral. In 1987, the Chicago Tribune listed DHS under Adams as the second most successful football team in the Chicago area over the prior ten years, with a record of 93-19. Over the years, he was frequently noted for his success, and later referred to as "legendary" by multiple publications.

== Notable players coached ==
- Mark Carlson former Minnesota Golden Gophers and American Football Association quarterback.
- Bryan Jurewicz former lineman for the University of Wisconsin Badgers, Carolina Panthers and Indianapolis Colts.
- Lindsay Knapp former lineman for the Kansas City Chiefs and Green Bay Packers (Super Bowl XXXI champions).
