= Rick Kogan =

- Born: September 13, 1951 (age 73); Chicago, Illinois, US
- Occupations: Journalist; Radio personality; Author
- Children: 1

Rick Kogan (born September 13, 1951) is a Chicago newspaperman, a Chicago radio personality and a noted author.

== Early life and education ==
A native of Chicago's Old Town neighborhood, Kogan is the son of longtime Chicago newspaperman Herman Kogan (1914–1989) and longtime Chicago literary and journalism fixture Marilew (Cavanagh) Kogan (1919–2007). His parents named him Rick and not Richard as a tribute to Riccardo's, a legendary Chicago restaurant and watering hole that now is known as Stefani's. On the night that Kogan was born, noted author, historian and broadcaster Studs Terkel came over and took Kogan's father, Herman, out for a celebratory drink.

Kogan's first home was in an apartment on the second floor of an old graystone at 1444 N. State Parkway on Chicago's Gold Coast, a building that was demolished in 1959. When Kogan's brother Mark was born several years later, the family relocated to an apartment in Old Town. "Everything swirled around that crazy second-floor apartment in Old Town," Kogan told the Chicago Reader in 2013. "To walk into this living room filled with smoke and clinking glasses and music and Studs (Terkel) and Nelson (Algren), Marcel Marceau, Mort Sahl, (Roger) Ebert -- you don't wind up in life being starstruck after that kind of childhood, and it's served me well."

Kogan attended LaSalle Elementary School in Chicago's Old Town neighborhood. and The Latin School of Chicago, Class of 1969. He did not earn a college degree, and worked a variety of jobs in his late teens and early twenties, including as a cab driver.

== Professional career ==
Kogan earned his first byline in the Chicago Sun-Times at age 16. Although he did not attend college, Kogan continued to write for the Sun-Times, the Chicago Daily News, and then, after the Daily News ceased publication in 1978, returning to the Sun-Times, where he specialized in writing about Chicago's nightlife.

In 1985, Kogan joined the Chicago Tribune, eventually becoming the paper's TV critic and later serving as editor of the Tribune's Tempo section. He currently is a senior reporter for the Tribune, and he also typically writes front-page obituaries of notable figures, particularly those who have worked in the news media, literature, entertainment and politics. Among those whom Kogan has memorialized with front-page obituaries are Milton J. Rosenberg, Hugh Hefner, Lois Weisberg, Dennis Farina, Roger Ebert, former Chicago first lady Maggie Daley, Studs Terkel, Floyd Kalber Irv Kupcinet, Eleanor "Sis" Daley (with Gary Washburn), Judge Abraham Lincoln Marovitz (with Noah Isackson), Jeff MacNelly, Charles M. Schulz, Gene Siskel, and Mike Royko (with Jerry Crimmins). Kogan also has written inside-the-paper obituaries of graphic designer Art Paul, photographer Art Shay, artist John Kearney, writer Norbert Blei, photographer Michael Abramson, newspaperman Paul Galloway, sportscaster Tim Weigel, puppeteer Shari Lewis and many others. In addition, he covered Siskel's funeral service.

For four years, Kogan edited the syndicated Ann Landers advice column that ran in the Tribune and was written by Eppie Lederer. After Lederer's death in June 2002, Kogan wrote a personal reminiscence about his experiences working with Lederer. The following year, he authored a book about Lederer, titled "America's Mom."

Kogan has had more than 2,300 bylines in the Tribune since 1985. One of his most popular features, "Sidewalks," is a weekly feature in the magazine that he produced with longtime Tribune photographer Charles Osgood, who retired in 2008.

Kogan previously was the host/producer of Chicago Live!, a radio show produced by the Chicago Tribune and broadcast on WGN Radio. Kogan worked in the late 1980s as a part-time entertainment reporter for WBBM-TV and has worked for WBBM radio as well.

From the fall of 1994 until the fall of 1995, Kogan hosted a Sunday morning talk show called "The Sunday Papers" on Chicago's WLUP-FM. From March 1998 until September 1998, Kogan teamed up with Chicago Sun-Times columnist and noted movie critic Richard Roeper to co-host a daily radio show called "Media Creatures" on Chicago's WMVP-AM. Kogan hosted a Sunday morning talk show called "The Sunday Papers" on Chicago's WGN-AM. He was widely known among Chicago radio listeners for his distinctive, gravely voice, which once was named the best voice in the city by Chicago's alternative Newcity. Kogan left WGN in September 2012 to become the afternoon host on Chicago's public radio station, WBEZ-FM. He left WBEZ in March 2013 and then rejoined WGN in September 2013, this time hosting a Sunday evening talk show. Called "After Hours with Rick Kogan," the show airs on Sunday nights from 9 to 11 p.m.

Kogan has authored eight books, including: Yesterday's Chicago (co-authored with his father, Herman); Everybody Pays (co-authored with Maurice Possley), about the Chicago mob and the retrial of mob hit man Harry Aleman; America's Mom: The Life, Lessons and Legacy of Ann Landers; A Chicago Tavern: A Goat, a curse And the American Dream, about Chicago's fabled Billy Goat Tavern; Dr. Night Life, Sidewalks: Portraits of Chicago; and Brunswick: The Story of an American Company from 1845 to 1985.

== Personal life ==
Kogan has a daughter, Fiona, who lives in Hyde Park with her mother. Kogan lives downtown.
