= Aaron Moorehead =

American football player and coach (born 1980)

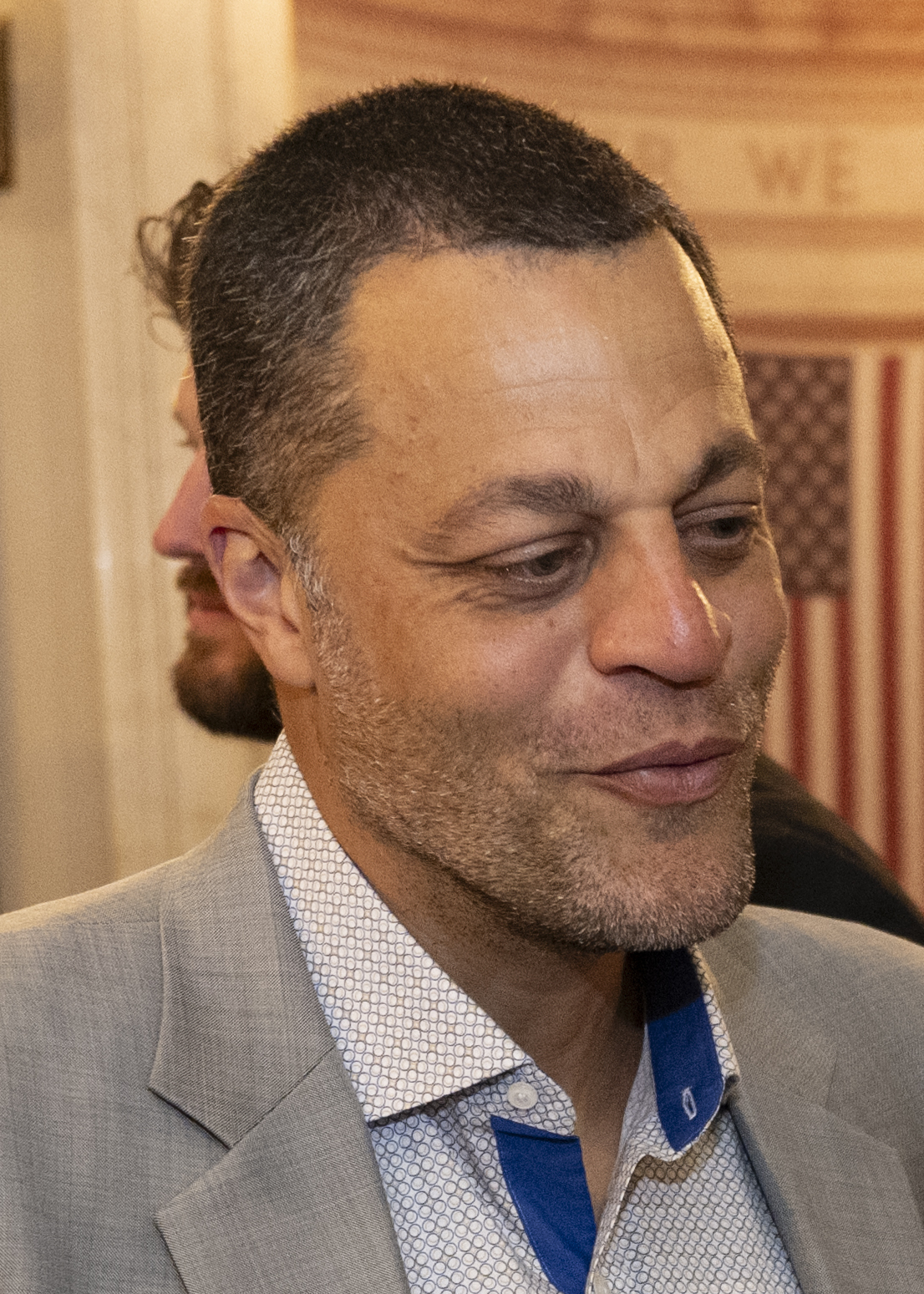
- Moorehead in 2025

Philadelphia Eagles
- Title: Wide receivers coach

Personal information
- Born: November 5, 1980 (age 46); Aurora, Colorado, U.S.
- Listed height: 6 ft 3 in (1.91 m)
- Listed weight: 200 lb (91 kg)

Career information
- Position: Wide receiver (No. 85)
- High school: Deerfield (IL)
- College: Illinois
- NFL draft: 2003: undrafted

Career history

Playing
- Indianapolis Colts (2003–2007)

Coaching
- New Mexico (2009) Graduate assistant; Stanford (2010–2012) Graduate assistant; Virginia Tech (2013–2014) Wide receivers coach; Texas A&M (2015–2017) Wide receivers coach; Vanderbilt (2018–2019) Wide receivers coach; Philadelphia Eagles (2020–present) Wide receivers coach

Awards and highlights
- As coach: Super Bowl champion (LIX); As player: Super Bowl champion (XLI)

Career NFL statistics
- Receptions: 31
- Receiving yards: 330
- Return yards: 41
- Total touchdowns: 1
- Stats at Pro Football Reference

Aaron Matthew Moorehead (born November 5, 1980) is an American professional football coach and former wide receiver, who is the wide receivers coach for the Philadelphia Eagles of the National Football League (NFL). He previously served as an assistant coach at Vanderbilt University, Texas A&M University, Virginia Tech, Stanford University and the University of New Mexico.

Moorehead played college football as a wide receiver at Illinois and signed with the Indianapolis Colts as an undrafted free agent in 2003. Moorehead played his entire 5-year career with the Colts from 2003 to 2007 and was a member of their Super Bowl XLI winning team over the Chicago Bears.

== Early life ==
Aaron attended South Park Elementary school in district 109. Then later attended Alan B. Shepard Jr. High which is also in district 109 Moorehead attended Deerfield High School in Deerfield, Illinois and was a standout in football and track. In his senior year, he went to the state meet and placed fourth in the 110m High Hurdles. His best time was 14.06 seconds.

== Professional career ==
Pre-draft measurables
| Height | Weight |
|---|---|
| 6 ft 3 3/8 in (1.91 m) | 203 lb (92 kg) |
Values from Pro Day

Moorehead signed with the Colts on May 5, 2003. He caught 31 passes for 330 yards and one touchdown during his career. In the 2006 postseason, Moorehead caught 5 catches for 41 yards. He became a free agent after the 2007 season.

| Season | 2003 | 2004 | 2005 | 2006 | 2007 |
|---|---|---|---|---|---|
| Receptions | 7 | 1 | 7 | 8 | 8 |
| Yards | 101 | 7 | 75 | 82 | 65 |
| Touchdowns | 0 | 0 | 0 | 1 | 0 |

== Coaching career ==
In 2009, he was a graduate assistant coach (offense) at the University of New Mexico. He was the wide receivers coach at Vanderbilt, Texas A&M, and Virginia Tech and was the assistant wide receivers coach at Stanford University.

On February 6, 2020, Moorehead was hired to be the wide receivers coach for the Philadelphia Eagles. He missed the team's week 11 game in 2020 against the Cleveland Browns due to COVID-19 pandemic protocols. Moorehead was part of the coaching staff that won Super Bowl LIX over the Kansas City Chiefs.

== Personal ==
He is the son of Emery Moorehead, a Super Bowl champion who played twelve seasons in the NFL with the New York Giants, Denver Broncos, and Chicago Bears. Aaron and his father are the NFL's third father-and-son tandem to both win a Super Bowl. The father-and-son duo joined Bob Griese /Brian Griese and Ronnie Lott /Ryan Nece. He is the cousin of former NBA basketball player Brad Daugherty.
