= Doug Kay =

American football player and coach

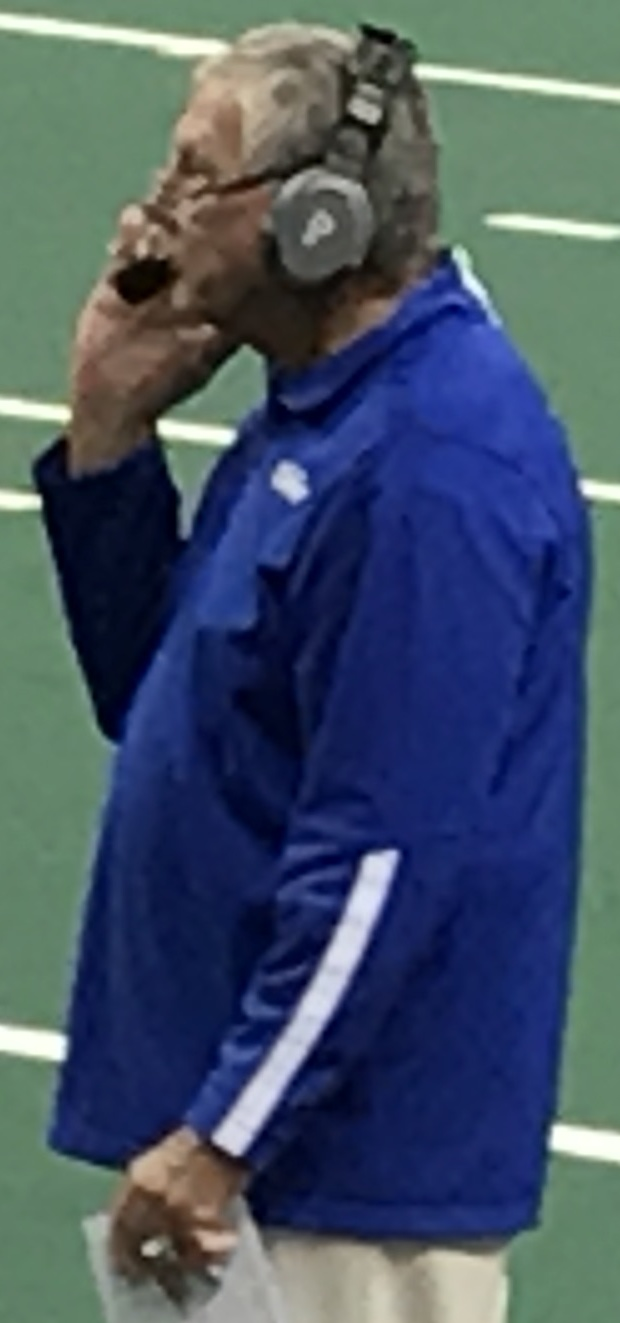
- Kay with the Tampa Bay Storm in 2017

Biographical details
- Born: Chicago, Illinois, U.S.
- Education: Western Illinois (B.A., 1961); Indiana State (M.S., 1966)

Playing career

Football
- ?–1959: Western Illinois

Baseball
- ?–?: Western Illinois
- Positions: Quarterback, defensive back, tight end, punter

Coaching career (HC unless noted)
- 1960: Western Illinois (QB/WR)
- 1961–1966: Deerfield HS (IL)
- 1967–1969: Indiana State (DC)
- 1971–1975: Olivet
- 1976: San Jose State (OC)
- 1977–1979: UCLA (DL/LB)
- 1980–1982: Hawaii (AHC/DC)
- 1983–1985: Portland Breakers
- 1986: Tampa Bay Bandits
- 1991: Raleigh–Durham Skyhawks (DC)
- 1993–1994: Tampa Bay Storm (DC)
- 1995: Charlotte Rage
- 1997: Arizona Rattlers (Assistant)
- 2000–2001: Carolina Cobras
- 2002: Tampa Bay Storm (Asst)
- 2006–2008: Columbus Destroyers
- 2013–2014, 2017: Tampa Bay Storm (AHC)

Head coaching record
- Overall: 23–20–1 (college); 36–55 (AFL)

Accomplishments and honors

Championships
- 1 MIAA (1974); 2 ArenaBowl (1993, 1997)

Doug Kay is an American former football coach. He was a head coach in the Arena Football League (AFL) for the Charlotte Rage, Carolina Cobras, and Columbus Destroyers. He was also the head football coach at Olivet College from 1971 to 1975.

== College career ==
Kay played college football under the tutelage of Lou Saban as a quarterback, defensive back, tight end and punter at Western Illinois University. He also played baseball at Western Illinois. He received a bachelor's degree in physical education from Western Illinois in 1961.

== Coaching career ==
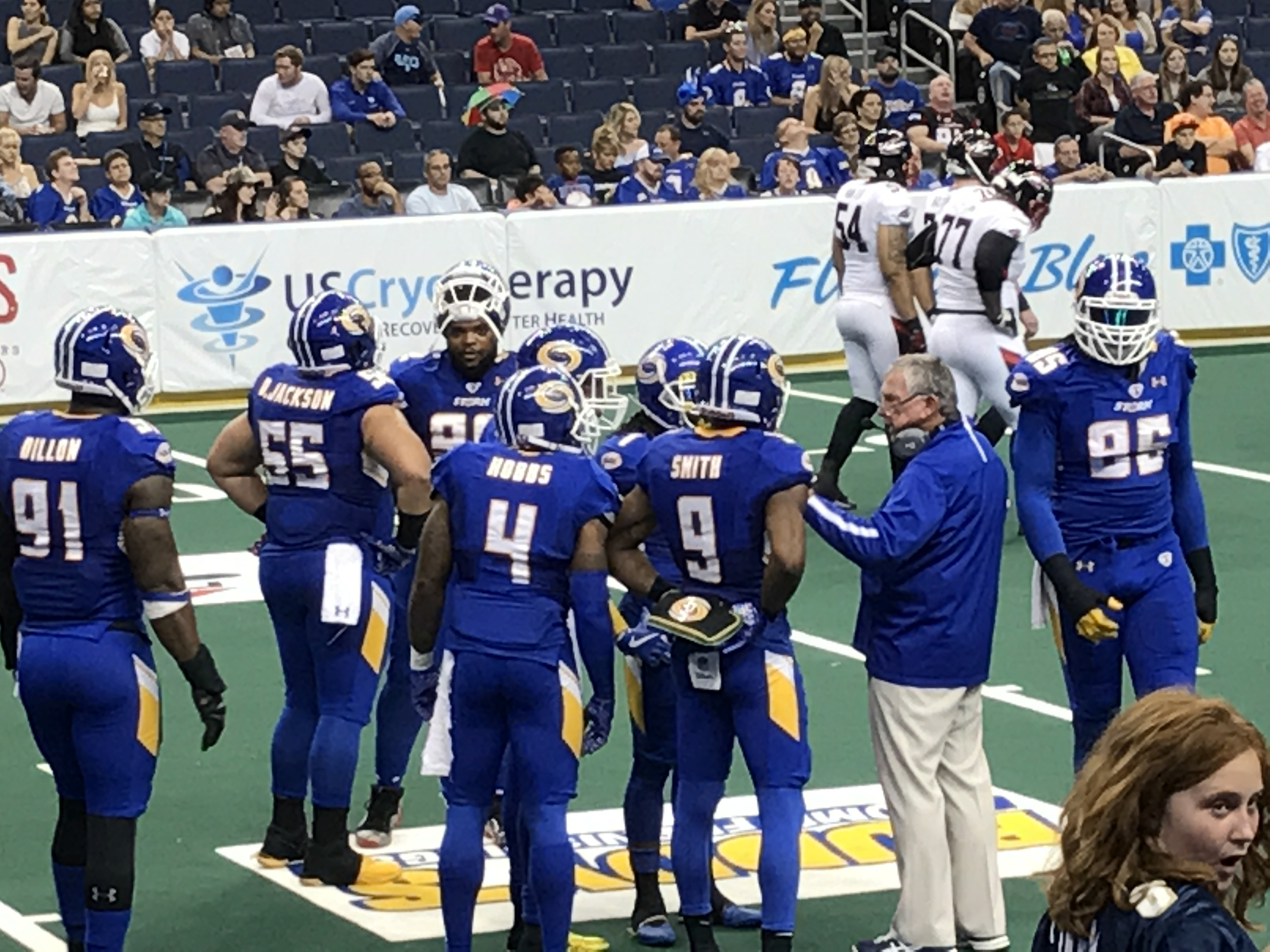
Kay directing the Storm defense during a timeout.

Kay's coaching career began in 1960 at his alma mater, Western Illinois University, as the quarterbacks and wide receivers coach. In 1961, Kay took over at Deerfield High School in Illinois, and coached there through the 1966 season; he was replaced by Paul Adams when he decided to return to college football.

From 1967 to 1969 Kay served as the defensive coordinator at Indiana State University. Kay was then named the head coach of Olivet College in 1970. He spent the next six seasons with Olivet before taking over as the offensive coordinator at San José State University in 1976.

Kay moved to UCLA in 1977 where he was an assistant coach, working mainly with the linebackers and defensive line. In 1980, he took over at the University of Hawaii as the associate head coach and defensive coordinator for three seasons. Kay spent four seasons in the United States Football League with the Boston/New Orleans Breakers and Tampa Bay Bandits.

His AFL experience began in 1993 as defensive coordinator of the ArenaBowl VII champion Tampa Bay Storm. Four years later, Kay was once again defensive coordinator of a championship team, helping the Arizona Rattlers capture ArenaBowl XI in 1997.

Kay was head coach of the Charlotte Rage in 1995 and returned to Charlotte as the head coach of the Carolina Cobras in 2000 and 2001. In 2001, Kay led the Cobras to their first non-losing season in their five-year franchise at a 7–7 record. He was head coach of the Columbus Destroyers from 2006 to 2008. In 2006, Kay led the Destroyers to their first non-losing season in the eight-year history of the franchise with an 8–8 record, setting franchise records for most wins and most road wins. He also tied a franchise record for most home wins with four. In 2007, despite a 7–9 regular season record, he won three playoff games and led the Destroyers to an appearance in ArenaBowl XXI, where they lost to the San Jose SaberCats. A 3–13 season in 2008 led to his dismissal. He later became an assistant for the Storm, where he was working when the league folded in 2017.

== Head coaching record ==
=== College ===
| Year | Team | Overall | Conference | Standing | Bowl/playoffs |
|---|---|---|---|---|---|
Olivet Comets (Michigan Intercollegiate Athletic Association) (1971–1975)
| 1971 | Olivet | 3–4–1 | 2–2–1 | 3rd | |
| 1972 | Olivet | 3–6 | 2–3 | 4th | |
| 1973 | Olivet | 6–3 | 3–2 | T–2nd | |
| 1974 | Olivet | 7–2 | 5–0 | 1st | |
| 1975 | Olivet | 4–5 | 2–3 | T–4th | |
| Olivet: | | 23–20–1 | 14–10–1 | | |
| Total: | | 23–20–1 | | | |
National championship Conference title Conference division title or championship game berth

=== AFL ===
| Team | Year | Regular season | | | | Postseason | | | |
| Team | Year | Won | Lost | Win % | Finish | Won | Lost | Win % | Result |
|---|---|---|---|---|---|---|---|---|---|
| CHA | 1995 | 5 | 7 | .417 | 2nd in NC East | 0 | 0 | .000 | |
| CAR | 2000 | 3 | 11 | .214 | 5th in NC South | 0 | 0 | .000 | |
| CAR | 2001 | 7 | 6 | .538 | Resigned | 0 | 0 | .000 | |
| CAR total | | 10 | 17 | .370 | | 0 | 0 | .000 | |
| COL | 2006 | 8 | 8 | .500 | 4th in NC East | 0 | 0 | .000 | |
| COL | 2007 | 7 | 9 | .438 | 3rd in NC East | 3 | 1 | .750 | Lost to San Jose SaberCats in ArenaBowl XXI |
| COL | 2008 | 3 | 13 | .188 | 5th in NC East | 0 | 0 | .000 | |
| COL total | | 18 | 30 | .375 | | 3 | 1 | .750 | |
| Total | | 33 | 54 | .379 | | 3 | 1 | .750 | |
