= Anthony Saliba =

American conservative and businessperson

Tony Saliba
- Born: Anthony J. Saliba; May 5, 1955 (age 71); Chicago, United States
- Other name: Tony Saliba
- Occupations: Trader, author, and entrepreneur
- Known for: Founder and CEO of financial technology company Fortify Technologies and CEO of Option Technologies Solutions International

Anthony "Tony" J. Saliba (born May 5, 1955) is an American financial trader, author, and entrepreneur in Chicago, Illinois, who is CEO of Liquid Mercury, vice chairman of the board of managers at Matrix Executions, CEO of Option Technologies Solutions International, and founder and CEO of Fortify Technologies.

== Early life and education ==
Saliba grew up in the Chicago area, and attended Highland Park High School in Highland Park, Illinois, where he competed in wrestling, track, and cross country, edited the school newspaper, and graduated in 1973. His interest in trading began in high school when he caddied for grain traders.

In 1977, he graduated as an Evans Scholar at the Kelley School of Business at Indiana University with a B.S. in accounting.

== Career ==
Saliba began his career as a stockbroker at a small firm in Indianapolis, Indiana in 1977. In 1979, after learning about the opportunities that existed in options trading, he became a clerk at the Chicago Board Options Exchange (CBOE). After a few months of clerking, a chance encounter on the floor with a trader who he had once caddied for sparked a fateful partnership. The terms of their agreement were simple: Saliba contributed his now-extensive trading knowledge while his acquaintance provided $50,000 in capital. Saliba was soon able to buy out his partner and began building his own trading network.

By 1987, he was a director on the CBOE board with 27 traders working for him. In 1989, Saliba was the only options trader profiled in Jack Schwager's Market Wizards, a classic trading book that features interviews with exceptionally successful traders. He was on CBOE's board of directors until 1990.

In 1989, he founded International Trading Institute, Ltd., a training institution for derivatives traders that built and delivered the first options simulator and pioneered training professional traders and market makers worldwide, and has continued to do so for more than 30 years.

In 1991, Saliba founded Salibaco, LLC, a floor-based options trading company that trained and financially backed young traders.

In 1992, Saliba founded his first company, First Traders Analytical Solutions, LLC, to provide options traders with technological solutions to route and execute trades.

In 1999, Saliba founded and was CEO of LiquidPoint, a trading platform, broker and solution provider that sold to Convergex Group, LLC for a mid-nine-figure sum in 2007. He was made executive managing director of Convergex after the acquisition until 2014. He is a founding member of Saliba Partners, LLC, a CBOE options trading firm. He also founded Efficient Capital Management, a portfolio investment firm, in 1999.

In 2011, he founded Fortify Technologies, a firm that operates outside of the trading industry. In 2015, he founded Saliba Venture Management, LLC (Saliba Ventures), which offers finance, strategy, and product consulting products.

In 2018, Saliba founded and is CEO of Liquid Mercury, a sister company of Matrix Executions. It is a hybrid that handles OTC (high-tough) cryptocurrency execution.

He was on the board of the Chicago Stock Exchange (CHX) from 2016 until 2018.

Saliba was CEO of Matrix Execution Technologies and has served as vice chairman of its board of managers since 2022. Matrix Executions, which formed as a joint venture with Investment Technology Group (ITG), was created as an agency broker-dealer and trading technology provider in 2018.

Saliba was previously an adviser to the Gary Sinise Foundation.

== Books (selection) ==
- Managing Expectations: Driving Profitable Option Trading Outcomes Through Knowledge, Discipline, and Risk Management (2016)
- Option Spread Strategies: Trading Up, Down, and Sideways Markets (2009)
- Option Strategies for Directionless Markets: Trading with Butterflies, Iron Butterflies, and Condors (2008)
