= Susan Hahn =

American writer

- Born: November 11, 1941 (age 84); Chicago, Illinois, U.S.
- Education: Highland Park High School; Northwestern University (BA, MA)
- Occupations: Poet; playwright; novelist
- Website: susanhahnauthor.com

Susan Hahn (born November 11, 1941) is an American poet, playwright and novelist. She is also a Guggenheim fellow.

== Biography ==
She was born Susan Firestone in Chicago, Illinois on November 11, 1941, and attended Highland Park High School. She attended Northwestern University where she received a B.A. and an M.A. in psychology She began working at the Woodlawn Mental Health Center after graduation and became licensed as a group therapist. After incorporating writing and art into her therapy, she began to write her own work and submitted some of her poems to Poetry magazine, where they were accepted.

In 1997 she started editing TriQuarterly literary magazine. She remained with TriQuarterly until 2010, when the magazine went to an online-only format. She is also a co-editor of works published by Northwestern University.

Hahn was the Ernest Hemingway Foundation's first writer-in-residence in 2013.

== Work ==
Hahn's writing has been described by Donna Seaman as displaying "bewitching" language and "sly" humor. As the featured Illinois poet, her work was described by the State of Illinois as "voyages into the uncharted seas of self and other."

Her novel, The Six Granddaughters of Cecil Slaughter, was favorably reviewed by Booklist and Library Journal.

In 1994, Hahn received a Society of Midland Authors Award for Poetry.

The Chicago Tribune listed Holiday and Mother in Summer in the ranks of the Best Books of 2002.

=== Novel ===
- The Six Granddaughters of Cecil Slaughter (2012)
- Losing Beck: A Triptych (2018)

=== Poetry ===
- Harriet Rubin's Mother's Wooden Hand (1991)
- Incontinence (1993)
- Melancholia, Etcetera (1995)
- Confession (1997)
- Holiday (2001)
- Mother in Summer (2002)
- Self/Pity (2005)
- The Scarlet Ibis (2007)
- The Note She Left (2008)
- Corner Office (2024)

=== Plays ===
- Golf (2005)
- The Scarlet Ibis (2007, reprised 2008)

== Awards and honors ==
Susan Hahn's honors and awards include:

- Illinois Arts Council Literary Awards and Fellowships
- The Society of Midland Authors Award for Poetry (1994)
- Poetry Magazine's George Kent Prize (2000)
- Guggenheim Foundation Fellowship in Poetry (2003-2004)
- First Class of Distinguished Alumni, Highland Park High School (2005)
- Pushcart Prizes, in fiction and poetry
- Hemingway Foundation, inaugural Writer-in-Residence (2013-2014)
