= Deerfield High School (Illinois) =

Location
- 1959 N. Waukegan Road; Deerfield, Illinois 60015; United States; 42.1874°N 87.8523°W

Information
- School type: Public Secondary
- Opened: 1959
- Status: Open
- School district: Township High School District 113
- Superintendent: Chala Holland
- NCES School ID: 171908002193
- Principal: Kathryn Anderson
- Teaching staff: 123.65 (on an FTE basis)
- Grades: 9–12
- Gender: Coed
- Enrollment: 1,437
- Average class size: 18.5
- Student to teacher ratio: 11.62
- Campus: Suburban
- Colors: Red; Grey
- Athletics conference: Central Suburban League
- Mascot: Warrior
- Nickname: Warriors
- Publication: Troubadour
- Newspaper: Deerprints
- Yearbook: O*YAD
- TV station: DHS-TV
- Communities Served: Deerfield, Bannockburn, Riverwoods, parts of Highland Park
- Feeder Schools: Charles J. Caruso Middle School, Alan B. Shepard Middle School, and Bannockburn School
- Website: dhs.dist113.org

Deerfield High School (abbreviated DHS) is a comprehensive public high school in Deerfield, Illinois, United States. It is part of Township High School District 113, which also includes Highland Park High School. DHS opened in 1959, and graduated its first class in 1963.

The school was as a National Blue Ribbon School by the United States Department of Education in 1992, 2009, and 2022. In sports competitions, the school has won multiple state championships. Deerfield competes in the Central Suburban League and in Illinois High School Association tournaments. DHS has also won awards for its theater, student newspaper, congressional debate, television, and scholastic bowl programs.

== History and campus ==
Completed in 1959, its first class graduated in 1963. As of 1999, DHS included 327,000 square feet (30,400 m^{2}) of space.

In 2000, DHS and its sister school, Highland Park High School, underwent a two-year, $75 million renovation and expansion project. DHS received new science and arts wings for a total of 140,000 square feet (13,000 m^{2}) added and 61,600 square feet (5,720 m^{2}) renovated. The additions and renovations were designed by Legat Architects and executed by VACALA Construction, Inc.

Beginning in 2004, the school ceased comparing the academic achievements of students, nor does it distribute students' class rank to colleges. The elimination of class rank aimed at creating a less stressful competitive academic environment.

The DHS Auditorium is a proscenium style theater that seats 969 persons and is used for assemblies and productions of dance, musical theater, and concerts by soloists and large ensembles. The Auditorium's stage house measures 3,200 square feet (300 m^{2}) with a proscenium that is 35 feet (11 m) wide, 18 feet (5.5 m) high and a stage that is 30 feet (9.1 m) deep to the cyclorama. The lighting grid is 30 feet (9.1 m) high. The Studio Theatre is located immediately adjacent to the Auditorium and is used as a backstage area during Auditorium productions. The orchestra pit is located at house level and can contain up to thirty musicians. The stage house has a 7-line, manual, single purchase counterweight fly system, with a 569-pound capacity per line-set. In addition, the Auditorium houses a walk-draw white cyclorama, movable tormentors, four travelers, dead-hung teasers and a walk draw black scrim. It just got a facelift so this info may not be accurate

The DHS Studio Theater is a 3,000-square-foot (300 m^{2}) reconfigurable black box theater. Its various seating configurations can accommodate up to 269 persons in thrust, proscenium, stadium, or arena arrangements. The lighting pipe grid is eighteen feet above the stage floor. The Studio Theatre has a reconfigurable walk-draw curtain system with a dedicated inventory of black stage draperies and a sky blue cyclorama. During Studio Theater productions the Auditorium stage is used as backstage. During Auditorium productions, the Studio Theatre is used as backstage.

== Academics ==
In the 2018-2019 academic year, Deerfield High School graduated 98% of its senior class. It also had 68% of students take AP classes, and was ranked as 12th in Illinois High Schools. Deerfield has made Adequate Yearly Progress on the Prairie State Achievement Examination, which with the ACT comprises the assessment tools used in Illinois to fulfill the federal No Child Left Behind Act.

Deerfield High School was in the top 500 public U.S. high schools in 2007 and in the top 1000 in 2006.

In 2024, Deerfield High School made it into the top 100 high schools in the state. Specifically, according to U.S. News & World Report, Deerfield ranked #16 in Illinois high schools.

== Awards ==
In its sixty years of existence, Deerfield High School has won many awards.

In 1990, 2009, and 2022, the high school was named a National Blue Ribbon School. This prestigious award is awarded by the United States Department of Education to high performing, and improving schools.

== Athletics ==
The Deerfield Warriors compete in the Central Suburban League, and counts its in-district sister school Highland Park High School as a longtime rival. The school's teams compete in state championship series tournaments sponsored by the Illinois High School Association (IHSA).

The school sponsors interscholastic sports teams for men and women in basketball, bowling, cross country, golf, gymnastics, soccer, swimming and diving, tennis, track & field, volleyball, and water polo. Men may also compete in baseball, football, and wrestling. Women may compete in badminton and softball.

The 1977 Deerfield boys cross country team is regarded by at least one publication as one of the single greatest prep cross country teams of all-time. Recognized by Marc Bloom's Harrier Report and the National High School Archives (xcnation.com).

While no longer sponsored by the IHSA, the school still has a women's field hockey team. While never sponsored by the IHSA, the school sponsors lacrosse for men and women. Deerfield also sponsors a joint fencing team with Highland Park High School for men and women.

A co-ed ice hockey team also competes against teams from surrounding schools, however it is not sponsored by the school or the IHSA. The team is supported entirely by private donations and players must purchase their own jerseys and equipment. In the 2007–2008 season, the Warriors defeated New Trier High School to win the State title in the White Division by a score of 3–1.

The school has won the following IHSA sponsored state championship tournaments or meets

- Badminton: 1987–88
- Cross Country (boys): 1976–1977, 1977–78
- Football: 1975–76
- Gymnastics (Boys): 2018
- Tennis (boys): 1983–84, 1994–95, 2004–05
- Tennis (girls): 2005–06

The football stadium is named for former coach Paul Adams, who coached the football team from 1966 to 1992, an era which included fifteen appearances in the State playoffs, four appearances in the State Championship game, and one State championship title.

In addition to the team's success, tennis player Mike Morrison was the second of two players in Illinois men's high school history to win four state singles titles (1983–1986). The only other player to accomplish this was Marty Riessen.

The school also sponsors cheerleading, fencing, pom-pons, and a dance team at the club level.

== Media and other student activities ==
The school newspaper is Deerprints; it won a Pacemaker award, given by the National Scholastic Press Association. Also, the school has a television station called DHS-TV that comes out with bi-weekly, and sometimes weekly 12-minute news shows during the homeroom period.

The Congressional Debate team (Student Congress) won the Illinois Congressional Debate Association (ICDA) state championship in 2003.

The Scholastic Bowl team qualified for the Class AA IHSA State Championship in 2004 and 2005 by winning its regional and sectional tournaments. The team also advanced to sectionals by winning regionals in 2006 and 2010.

=== Theater ===
Deerfield won the IHSA championship in Drama in 1970–71.

In 2018, Deerfield High School student Natalie Doppelt won the IHSMTA for Best Actress for her role in the DHS production of Sister Act.

In 2019, Deerfield High School’s production of Crazy for You brought in 5 nominations and 2 wins at the IHSMTA, DHS' theatre director Susan Gorman won the award for Best Direction and DHS student Jacob Simon won the award for Best Actor.

== Notable alumni ==
- Hub Arkush, publisher of Pro Football Weekly, radio color commentator
- Rob Baxter, NBA court lighting designer
- Dean Bernardini, bass for rock band Chevelle
- Donald Blome, United States diplomat.
- Joey Calistri, former MLS soccer player
- Mark Carlson, former Minnesota Golden Gophers quarterback
- Scott Colton, professional wrestler as "Colt Cabana"
- Ross Golan, songwriter, multi-platinum, award-winning songwriter
- Duje Dukan, professional basketball player
- Simone Elkeles, young adult author
- Cory Everson (1984–1989), Miss Olympia, author, actor, fitness show host, IFBB Hall of Fame
- Alexander Glantz, known as “Alexander 23”, singer/songwriter
- Chris Hirata, astrophysicist, professor, gold medal 1996 International Physics Olympiad
- Charlie Jones, Wide receiver for the Cincinnati Bengals
- Bryan Jurewicz, NFL lineman
- Lindsay Knapp, NFL offensive lineman
- Christina Loukas, 2008 and 2012 US Olympic diver
- Lou Manfredini, television/radio personality, home improvement expert
- Kevin McCollum, Broadway producer
- Aaron Moorehead, former NFL wide receiver for the Indianapolis Colts
- The Redwalls (Logan Barren, Justin Baren, and Andrew Langer), rock band
- Todd Reirden, former NHL hockey player, assistant coach for Washington Capitals
- Carol Roth, author, radio and TV host
- Andrea Sanke, journalist
- Radhanath Swami, spiritual guru
- Jonathan Zarem, scholar of the motion picture Ocean's Eleven

== Notable staff ==
- Paul Adams – head football coach 1966–1992.
- Aaron Cohen (born 1981), judoka and judo coach
- Doug Kay – head football coach (1962–65), later coached at the college and professional levels, including the Arena Football League
