= Simone Elkeles =

American author

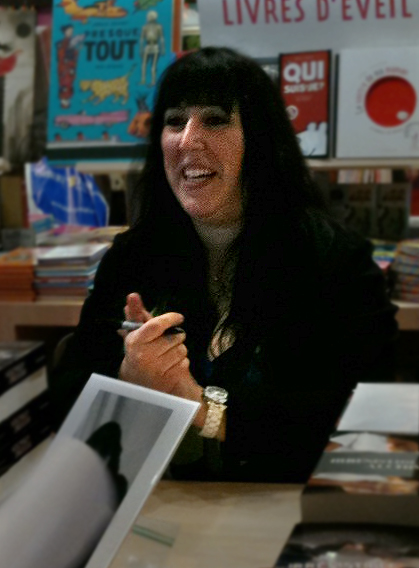
- Simone Elkeles
- Born: Simone Elkeles; Chicago, Illinois, U.S.
- Education: University of Illinois (BS); Loyola University Chicago (MS)
- Occupation: Novelist
- Writing career
- Genres: Young adult fiction, romance, teen romance
- Notable works: Perfect Chemistry Trilogy, How to Ruin Trilogy, Leaving Paradise, Return to Paradise
- Notable awards: RITA award – Young Adult Romance; 2010 Perfect Chemistry
- Website: www.simoneelkeles.com

Simone Elkeles is an American author known for the teen romance Perfect Chemistry trilogy and How To Ruin trilogy. She is a New York Times Bestselling young adult author. Elkeles won the 2010 RITA Award for Best Young Adult Romance from the Romance Writers of America for her book Perfect Chemistry. The sequel to Perfect Chemistry, Rules of Attraction, appeared on USA Today Best Sellers List and The New York Times Best Sellers List.

== Early years ==
Simone Elkeles was born in Chicago, Illinois. Her family later moved to Glenview, Illinois, up until her freshman year of high school, when they moved to Deerfield, Illinois, a suburb of Chicago. She attended Deerfield High School and graduated in 1988. She then attended Purdue University, but graduated from the University of Illinois, earning a Bachelor of Science in psychology. While working for manufacturing company creating diversity programs for their employees, she continued her education at Loyola University Chicago, where she received her Master of Science degree in industrial relations. After finishing her education she went to work at her father's manufacturing company. When he died, she—at 24 years old—became the CEO. She learned about marketing and about business, instead of teaching her about writing. She has one son and one daughter. In 2014, Elkeles was divorced from her husband.

== Author ==
Simone starting writing in 2000, but she did not sign right away. After she completed How to Ruin a Summer Vacation, Elkeles began sending her book to agents. After 5 years of searching, Elkeles finally found an agent, Nadia Cornier, who loved How to Ruin a Summer Vacation and would be willing to sign her. Her agent sold Simone's first three books before Elkeles split from her agent and found her current agent, Kristin Nelson, who was able to take Simone to “the next level”. She has since won many awards and recognition for her works, including being named Author of the Year by the Illinois Association of Teachers of English.

In September 2024 Simone joined the Lee County Sheriff’s Office in Lee County, Florida as a Community Service Officer.

== Works ==
Simone Elkeles currently has 10 works of young adult fiction.

How to Ruin Trilogy

- How to Ruin a Summer Vacation (2006)
- How to Ruin My Teenage Life (2007)
- How to Ruin Your Boyfriend's Reputation (2009)
- Ruined (2010) (How to Ruin Trilogy: #1-3)

Leaving Paradise/ Return to Paradise

- Leaving Paradise (2007)
- Return to Paradise (2010)

Perfect Chemistry Trilogy

- Perfect Chemistry (2008)
- Rules of Attraction (2010)
- Chain Reaction (2011)

Wild cards/crush

- Wild Cards (2013)
- Wild Crush (2015)

=== Standalone novels ===
- Crossing the Line (2018)
- American Princess Warrior (2022)

== Reception ==
Perfect Chemistry received mixed to generally positive reviews. RT Book Reviews gave it 4 stars stating,

"Elkeles sure hits her stride in this story of star-crossed lovers. She takes a storyline that could be clichéd and turns it into a gripping tale readers will race through to find out if happily ever after really is possible."

Kirkus reviews says of Perfect Chemistry,

"Elkeles pens plenty of tasteful, hot scenes—including one where Brittany loses her virginity to Alex—that keep the pages turning. The other elements come together as well, though they seem forced. Alex and his friends are not fully fleshed out, and their voices and dialogue definitely don't capture their characters or their experiences. Brittany's issues and dramas with her mother and her entourage come off like a groan-inducing after-school special. Still, as the title implies, the author definitely knows how to write romance, and that should help readers overlook some of the cheesier bits."

For Leaving Paradise RT Book Reviews nominated it 2010 Young Adult novel and gives it a Top Pick rating of 4 1/2 stars saying,

"At once laugh-out-loud funny and tearjerkingly sad, this heartrending novel is impossible to put down. Elkeles’ style here is very different from her How to Ruin … series, and this reviewer is loving the change-up. The emotion behind her characters’ dilemma leaps off the page, keeping you desperate to know if they can ever work things out."

== Awards and recognition ==
- 2008 Author of the Year by the IL Association of Teachers of English
- 2010 - Romance Writers of America RITA Award, Young Adult Romance – Perfect Chemistry
- New York Times Best Seller List for Rules of Attraction and Return to Paradise
- USA Today Best Sellers List
