= Perfect Chemistry =

2009 novel by Simone Elkeles

- Author: Simone Elkeles
- Series: Perfect Chemistry
- Genre: Teen Romance/Young Adult
- Publisher: Walker Books for Young Readers
- Publication date: 23 December 2008
- Pages: 360
- ISBN: 978-0802798220
- Followed by: Rules of Attraction

Perfect Chemistry is the first novel in the trilogy written by author Simone Elkeles and published by Walker Books for Young Readers in 2009 and also made it on The New York Times Best Seller list. Perfect Chemistry depicts a high school romance between the main characters Brittany Ellis, a white uptown teenager, and Alejandro "Alex" Fuentes, a lower class teenager of Mexican heritage. The two must overcome Brittany's troubled home life and Alex's gang ties to have their own happily ever after. The book was read and reviewed worldwide.

Simone Elkeles has revealed in many interviews that she admits to writing Young Adult fiction Romance novels and with the Perfect Chemistry series she had to do extensive research to understand the cultural background of Alex's Mexican heritage. The book was followed by two sequels centered on the following Fuentes brothers, Carlos and Luis. The book takes place in Chicago, where the two must contend with gang fights, the mystery surrounding the Fuentes' murder of their father, and the world's outlook on their relationship.

Elkeles has stated that she would like to continue writing books in the Perfect Chemistry series.

== Overview ==
Brittany Ellis has worked extremely hard to put on a picture perfect image to hide her horrible home life and Alex Fuentes' dangerous gang ties through friends, family and he himself throughout his life have caused him nothing but chaos. Their senior year at high school starts and Brittany and Alex are assigned to each other as lab partners in chemistry at their school, Fairfield High. Brittany knows that Alex and his reputation are threatening everything she has worked so hard to keep in place such as her perfect reputation, her relationship with her popular boyfriend Colin (the star captain of the football team) and her secret home life that no one, not even her best friends, must find out about. Alex and his friends make a bet that Alex has to have sex with Brittany before Thanksgiving in order to boost Alex's bad boy reputation and to ruin Brittany's picture perfect one. But feelings appear and Alex starts to second guess the bet but also the relationship when Brittany begins to open up about her life introducing him to her deepest secret, but doubt returns once more knowing that the gang lifestyle that had claimed his father's life is bound to claim his also. Finally he leaves the gang and he proposes Brittany in marriage.

== Main characters ==
Brittany Ellis – One of the two main protagonists of the novel. Brittany is perfect, or so it seems. Her home life is the root of her struggles. Her parents are considering sending her sister away to a home for people with disabilities while her boyfriend is trying to convince her to do things that she doesn't feel ready for. Brittany's mother is very concerned with appearances and controls Brittany to present the prefect facade. Mr. Ellis likes to hide behind his work and doesn't communicate much with his family. Brittany always ends up caring for her mentally and physically disabled sister, Shelley.

Alex Fuentes – One of the two main protagonists of the novel. Alex is the bad boy that no one wants to mess with – at least that's what everyone thinks. He struggles greatly with the murder of his father and will stop at nothing to prevent his younger brothers Carlos and Luis from entering the dangerous world of drugs, alcohol and gangs. His ex-girlfriend Carmen is constantly on his back, trying to keep him involved in gangs and with her – even though she has cheated on him many times. Alex feels that the only way to keep his family safe is to be in the Latino Blood, the gang that his father was in. Alex once thought that he could protect his family with his own hands, but that was before his father's brutal murder twenty feet from his six-year-old face.

Mrs. Peterson – Alex and Brittany's high school chemistry teacher, who assigns them to be lab partners in her class. She is one of the few teachers not afraid to stand up to the students who are associated with the Latino Blood gang.

Sierra – Brittany's best friend, who initially doesn't think that Brittany and Alex's relationship is a good idea.

Isabella – Alex's good friend who has a crush on Paco, Alex's best friend. As the story progresses, she becomes one of Brittany's best friends.

Hector- The main antagonist of the novel. He is the leader of the Latino Bloods, the gang that Alex is a part of.

Paco – Alex's best friend, who doesn't want Alex to hurt Brittany or get her involved in the gang lifestyle.

Colin – The secondary antagonist of the novel. He is Brittany's boyfriend, who is trying to convince Brittany to have sex with him while keeping a serious secret from her. Throughout the book he clashes with Alex whenever the latter tries to win the affections of Brittany, making Colin Alex's main love rival.

Darlene – Brittany's friend (at least in the beginning), who wants to steal Brittany's boyfriend and popularity.

Shelley – Brittany's disabled older sister who is the first person in Brittany's life to accept Alex as Brittany's new friend.

Mrs. Fuentes – The widowed mother of Alex, Carlos, and Luis. She seems to dislike Brittany when they first meet, going as far as calling her a 'tramp'.

Carlos – Alex's younger brother and the older brother of Luis. He is considering in joining the Latino Bloods just like his father and older brother did, much to the disapproval of Alex.

Luis – The youngest member of the Fuentes family. Unlike his older brothers, Alex and Carlos, he doesn't want anything to do with gangs and instead dreams on one day becoming an astronaut.

== Awards ==
- 2012 YALSA Popular Paperback for Young Adults
- 2011–2012 Winner of Eliot Rosewater Indiana High School Book Award
- 2011 Abraham Lincoln Award List
- 2010 Top Ten YALSA Quick Picks for Reluctant Young Readers
- 2010 Romance Writers of America RITA award winner for Best Young Adult Romance
- 2010 Kentucky Bluegrass High School Book Award List
- 2010–2011 Winner of Pennsylvania Young Reader's Choice Award in the YA division
- 2010 Winner of Club Romantica's DAMA award- Best Young Adult Romance in Spanish

== Genre ==
Perfect Chemistry fits into the romance, young adult, contemporary and urban genre categories in fiction. A reviewer at Romantic Times Magazine described the novel as "Elkeles sure hits her stride in this story of star-crossed lovers. She takes a storyline that could be clichéd and turns it into a gripping tale readers will race through to find out if happily ever after is possible." This is not a typical romance novel because of its unique storyline when Elkeles adds in the gang ties throughout Alex's family and how his father's mysterious murder can come between his and Brittany's relationship when he must choose which would be more important to him. The narrative has been described in a scholarly review as being "full of soap opera worthy melodrama" when Brittany stands up for her family and helps Alex break free of his gang and have a happy ending. In an interview published by Voya Magazine, Simone Elkeles describes the genre she writes in and her reason for doing so stating, "Yes, I write teen romances and I'm not afraid or ashamed to say it. I love all of the couples I've written about–they're all romantic and magical in their own way." Also, adding a touch of Alex's Mexican culture throughout the novel helping to relate to the character and adding to the spicy romance. Elkeles also describes her books as portraying teen sexuality in her books stating how in reality most teenagers lose their virginity in high school just like the character Brittney Ellis.

== Book ban ==
In 2023, the book was banned, in Clay County District Schools, Florida.
