= Highland Park High School (Highland Park, Illinois) =

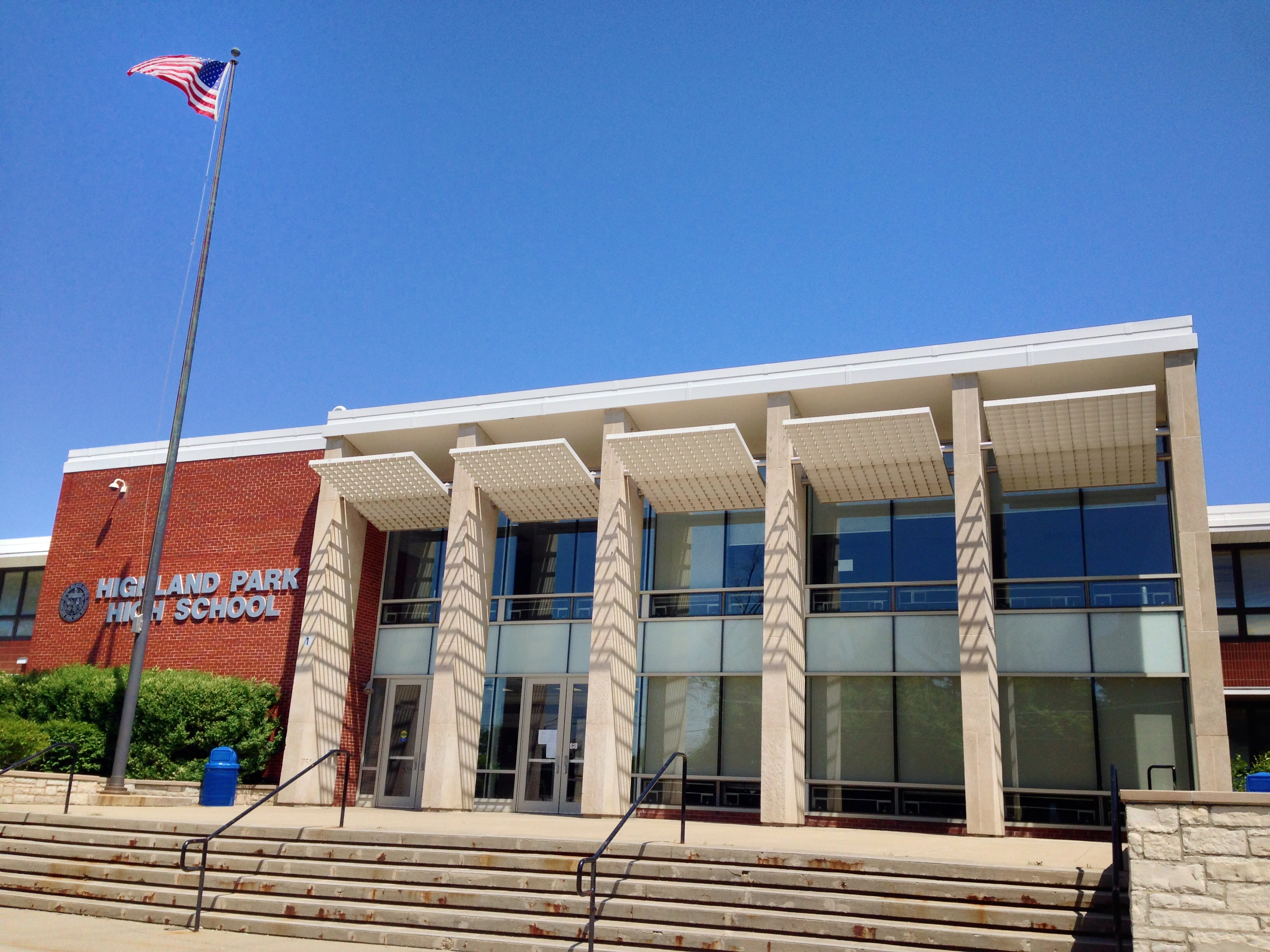

Location
- 433 Vine Avenue; Highland Park, Illinois 60035; United States; 42°11′36″N 87°48′06″W

Information
- Type: Public
- Motto: Dream—Believe—Achieve
- Opened: 1889
- School district: Township High School District 113
- Superintendent: Chala Holland
- CEEB code: 142275
- Principal: Holly Fleischer
- Teaching staff: 135.20 (on an FTE basis)
- Grades: 9–12
- Gender: all
- Enrollment: 1,715 (2023–2024)
- Student to teacher ratio: 12.68
- Campus type: Suburban
- Colours: Blue; White
- Athletics conference: Central Suburban League
- Team name: Giants
- Publication: Sojourn
- Newspaper: Shoreline
- Yearbook: Little Giant
- Website: HPHS

Highland Park High School (HPHS) is a public four-year high school located in Highland Park, Illinois, a North Shore suburb of Chicago, Illinois. It is part of Township High School District 113. From 1900 to 1904, the school was known as Deerfield High School. The high school served both Deerfield (renamed Moraine in 1998) and Shields townships from 1904 until 1936 and was Deerfield-Shields High School. The building of Lake Forest High School in 1936 provided a school to serve Shields Township students. This led to the return of the name Highland Park High School. A new, separate Deerfield High School opened 20 years later to serve the growing population.

== History ==
For a period of approximately fourteen years following Highland Park High School's establishment in 1886, classes were held in the rooms over the Brand Brothers paint shop in downtown Highland Park. It has occupied the present site on Vine Avenue since 1900. Over the course of time, however, several additions have been constructed. In 2000, HPHS and its sister school, Deerfield High School underwent a two-year, $75 million renovation and expansion project. HPHS received several new additions and renovations with 130,000 square feet (12,000 m^{2}) renovated and 77,000 square feet (7,200 m^{2}) added. The additions and renovations were designed by Legat Architects and executed by VACALA Construction, Inc.

== Academics ==
In 2025, Highland Park had an average composite ACT score of 27.1 and graduated 95.1% of its senior class.

Highland Park High School has non native-English speaking students and a student population of 61.2% white, 29.8% Hispanic, 4.7% Two or More Races, 2.2% Asian, 1.7% Black, 0.3% American Indian/Alaska Native, & 0.2% Native Hawaiian/Pacific Islander.

== Student life ==
=== Athletics ===
School Sports logo

Highland Park competes in the Central Suburban League and is a member of the Illinois High School Association (IHSA) which governs most of the sports and competitive activities in the state. Its teams compete as the Giants.

The school sponsors interscholastic sports teams for young men and women in basketball, cross country, gymnastics, soccer, swimming and diving, tennis, track and field, volleyball, wrestling, and water polo. Young men may also compete in baseball, golf, football, and Scholastic wrestling. Women may compete in softball and field hockey. While not sponsored by the IHSA, the school also sponsors teams for men and women in lacrosse in addition to an ice hockey team for men. Highland Park also sponsors a joint fencing team with Deerfield High School for men and women.

The following teams have won their respective IHSA sponsored state championship tournament:

- Cross country (Boys): State Champions (1961–62)
- Golf (Boys): State Champions (1939–40, 1947–48, 1951–52, 1952–53, 1958–59)
- Tennis (Boys): State Champions (1972–73)

=== Activities ===
Highland Park offers 64 clubs, activities, and intramurals for students. Among these activities are chapters or affiliates of several nationally notable organizations: Amnesty International, Congressional Debate, DECA, FIRST Tech Challenge, Key Club, and Model UN.

The following competitive teams have won their respective IHSA sponsored state championship tournament:

- Drama: State Champions (1977–78)
- Group Interpretation: State Champions (1979–80)

The following clubs have scored championships in non-IHSA sanctioned events:

- Congressional Debate: 1st Place Harvard National Congress (2006, 2009)
- Wind Symphony: Gold Medal Young Prague International Music Festival (2012)

=== Philanthropy ===
Since 1994, students at HPHS annually mobilize to support a charity during February. This month-long event is known as "Charity Drive" and is orchestrated by the Charity Drive Committee, one of the subdivisions of the school-wide political Student Senate. Students choose the charity in a school vote. The school regularly raises six-figure amounts and is courted by charities. Fundraising activities last the whole month and include raffles, themed events, and a battle of the bands. As of 2016 students have raised more than $3 million.

== Notable people ==
=== Academia and letters ===
- Eric Engberg (class of 1959) is a former correspondent for CBS News (1976 to 2003).
- Stephen Glass (class of 1990) is a former reporter at The New Republic disgraced in a scandal dramatized in Shattered Glass.
- William Goldman (class of 1948) was an Academy Award-winning screenwriter (Butch Cassidy and All the President's Men), and author of The Princess Bride.
- John M. Grunsfeld is an astronaut at NASA.
- David R. Palmer (class of 1959) is a science fiction author.
- Francis G. Pease was an astronomer.
- Mike Resnick (class of 1959) is a science fiction author.
- Brian Ross (class of 1966) is a broadcast journalist.
- Peter Suber (class of 1969) is Director of the Office for Scholarly Communication at Harvard University and a leader in the movement for open access to research.
- Maria Tatar (class of 1963) is the John L. Loeb Professor of Germanic Languages & Literatures, and Chair of the Committee on Degrees in Folklore and Mythology at Harvard University.
- Stephen Wizner (class of 1955) is a law professor at Yale University.

=== Arts ===
- Paul Brickman (class of 1967) is a screen writer and director. Wrote and directed Risky Business (1983).
- Rachel Brosnahan (class of 2008) is an Emmy Award and Golden Globe-winning actress in the Netflix series House of Cards and the Amazon Prime Video series The Marvelous Mrs. Maisel.
- Suzanne Rand Eckmann (class of 1967) was the co-star of the two person comedy team of Monteith and Rand. They appeared on Broadway in 1979.
- Brett Gelman (class of 1995) is an actor and comedian.
- Susan Hahn (class of 1959), poet, playwright, and novelist.
- Brad Herzog (class of 1986) is an author and journalist.
- Brian Levant is a producer, director, and writer of family movies such as Jingle All the Way or TV shows like Mork & Mindy.
- Eric Orner is a cartoonist and author of the graphic novel Smahtguy: The Life and Times of Barney Frank
- Peter Orner (class of 1986) is an author and essayist.
- Jeff Perry (class of 1973) is an actor who co–founded the Steppenwolf Theater.
- Christina Ramberg (class of 1964) was a painter associated with the Chicago Imagists
- David Rudman (class of 1981) is an actor, writer, director, and puppeteer well-known for his work on Sesame Street and various Muppet projects.
- Gary Sinise (class of 1974) is an Emmy Award and Golden Globe-winning actor.
- Rosalind Fox Solomon (class of 1947), photographer
- Lauren Tom, (class of 1977), actress best-known for her roles on Futurama, Codename: Kids Next Door, Batman Beyond and Andi Mack
- D. B. Weiss, co-creator and producer of Game of Thrones

=== Business ===
- Edward Lowenstein (1913-1970) Greensboro, North Carolina Architect and Civil Rights proponent.
- Sam Zell

=== Sports ===
- Josh Bartelstein CEO of the Phoenix Suns, Phoenix Mercury, and Footprint Center
- Jason Brown (class of 2013) is a US Olympic figure skater and 2015 national champion.
- Tony Cogan was a Major League Baseball pitcher.
- Tunch Ilkin was a sports broadcaster and a former NFL Pro Football player for the Pittsburgh Steelers and Green Bay Packers

=== Military ===
- Follett Bradley (class of 1906) was a Major General
- Stansfield Turner (class of 1941) was a U.S. Navy Admiral and later CIA Director.
- Jonathan Mayhew Wainwright IV (class of 1901) was an Army Lieutenant General. He is a Medal of Honor recipient.

=== Politics and activism ===
- David Crane (class of 1968) is a lawyer who served as the Chief Prosecutor for the Special Court of Sierra Leone
- Mitch Friedman (class of 1981), Washington state–based conservation movement activist
- David Berry Knapp (class of 1967), follower of Rajneesh and mayor of Rajneeshpuram
- Anthony Saliba (class of 1973), businessman, entrepreneur, and board of trustees member, The Heritage Foundation
- Paul Soglin (class of 1962) was the 51st, 54th, and 57th mayor of Madison, Wisconsin
- Jill Stein (class of 1968), an American physician, activist, and politician affiliated with the Green Party of the United States

=== Staff ===
- Paul Adams briefly taught at HPHS after leaving the military, before transferring to Deerfield High School in 1966 and becoming that school's head football coach.
- Jerry Wainwright was the school's head boys basketball coach (1978—83). He was later men's head coach at DePaul University.
