= Mitch Friedman =

American conservationist (born c. 1963)

Mitchell A. Friedman (born c. 1963) is an American conservation biologist and activist who founded the organization Conservation Northwest in 1989 and now serves as its executive director. Active in the U.S. state of Washington, Friedman published early in his career on protection of the North Cascades ecosystem. His 2025 memoir, Conservation Confidential, was published as a strategy guide for activists based on his radical experiences with Earth First! and less polarizing leadership of Conservation Northwest.

== Early life and education ==
Mitch Friedman was born in Chicago, Illinois, in 1963 or 1964. (Note: In 2012, Friedman was 48 years old.) He was raised in the suburb of Deerfield as the youngest of four children, and during his adolescence went on canoeing trips to the Boundary Waters, which had "a huge impact" on him. Also during his upbringing, Friedman was shocked during a family trip to a national forest in Colorado that logs were allowed to be harvested from within the supposedly-protected area.

While attending Highland Park High School, Friedman played on the football team, but stood out more for his successes on the pole vault, in which he was a state medalist. He enrolled at Montana State University in 1981 to continue his pole vaulting career, where he majored in wildlife management. He transferred to the University of Washington after two years, where he completed a double major in zoology and environmental studies.

== Career ==
While a student at the University of Washington, Friedman spotted a flyer for a meeting of Earth First!, a radical nature conservation movement. After attending the meeting, he became a leader within the Washington Earth First! movement and organized Earth Day events on the university campus. During his time with Earth First!, Friedman tree sat in Oregon and Washington on multiple occasions, including in 1985 at the Millennium Grove in Oregon. During a period from 1985 to 1988, he was arrested approximately a dozen times for his actions, including for protesting clearcutting of old-growth forests. In 1991, Friedman published an article on ancient forests in the second-ever issue of Wild Earth.

Friedman published books in 1988 and 1993 applying principles of conservation biology to the protection of ecosystems in the North Cascades and wider Pacific Northwest: Forever Wild (1988) and Cascadia Wild (1993).

In the late 1980s, Friedman, then with Earth First!, devised the idea for what became the Ancient Forest Rescue Expedition, a 1989 cross-country tour of a trailered old-growth log intended to nationalize support for protection of ancient forests. The expedition departed from Pike Place Market on Earth Day 1989 and returned to Portland, Oregon, a month later. Driving the log (named "The Big One" and displaying a banner reading "Save Our Ancient Forests!") coast-to-coast through over 40 U.S. states, the group of expeditioners brought attention to the issue of old-growth logging by displaying the "monster" log, sourced from Washington state. Subsequent tours were undertaken in 1990 and 1991.

=== Conservation Northwest ===
In 1989, Friedman became frustrated with the stalling progress of Earth First! and founded his own advocacy group in Bellingham: the Greater Ecosystem Alliance, which was later renamed the Northwest Ecosystem Alliance and eventually became Conservation Northwest. At the time of his organization's founding, Friedman had never held a single job "for longer than a few months". Under his leadership, Conservation Northwest has been involved in several notable advancements.

In 1996, Conservation Northwest, then known as the Northwest Ecosystem Alliance, placed the highest bid at an auction for logging rights to a stand of trees in the Okanogan National Forest, becoming the first group without intention to log to place the highest bid on a U.S. Forest Service timber sale. This also marked the first occasion Friedman's group had attempted to preserve forests through economic engagements such as rights purchases rather than lobbying or legal battles; because the legal challenges originally posed by the organization did not pan out, Friedman said they were left "no option but to be innovative" and fundraise to purchase the timber rights themselves. The Forest Service eventually rejected their bid, refusing to sell to a group unwilling to log the land.

The Northwest Ecosystem Alliance later struck a deal with the state of Washington to transfer parcels of land in the Loomis State Forest away from school trusts—where trees could be cut down to create funds for public schools—and into a Natural Resources Conservation Area where the trees would be protected from logging. The transfer was completed in 2000, and was based on a 1998 settlement agreement. During that time period, the Northwest Ecosystem Alliance fundraised over $16 million, the appraised value equivalent to cut trees, in order to protect trees within the forest from actually being cut down. Friedman's organization received the final $3.5 million needed to complete the deal from Paul Allen's foundation. Friedman said of using logging to fund schools: "One hundred years ago, when forests were abundant, it made sense ... Today, forests are one of our most valuable resources."

By 2014, eight thousand acres of land adjacent to Lake Whatcom had become the seventh-largest locally-managed park in the United States due to a reconveyance advocated for by the Whatcom Land Trust and Conservation Northwest. Parts of the land were leased to private forestry companies until it became a park.

Conservation Northwest became an affiliate member organization of the National Wildlife Federation in 2016. In 2017, the headquarters of Conservation Northwest were moved from Bellingham, Washington, to Seattle. Conservation Northwest led an effort (which they had joined in 2001) to protect the core of Blanchard Mountain that culminated in 2018 when the Washington State Legislature included in its annual budget bill the final tranche to save the core of Blanchard State Forest from logging.

As part of their goal to link Cascades habitats on both sides of Interstate 90, Conservation Northwest coordinated efforts that induced WSDOT to build a wildlife overpass over I-90, which animals began using in 2018.

In 2021, Conservation Northwest facilitated and funded the purchase of a 9,000+ acre ranch by the Confederated Tribes of the Colville Reservation. Conservation Northwest hails this as, for the time, the largest privately-funded return of land to indigenous peoples in the Western United States.

In a 2021 KUOW article, Friedman is quoted and states his philosophy on Washington forests: "These lands are a gift that should not have to be squeezed for every dollar when they already benefit us in so many ways ..." Among his awards, Friedman was in 2022 awarded a Conservation Leadership Award by the Wilburforce Foundation, one of four recipients that year. Also in 2022, the National Wildlife Federation honored Conservation Northwest with their Affiliate of the Year award.

Friedman's memoir and activism strategy guide, Conservation Confidential: A Wild Path to a Less Polarizing and More Effective Activism, was published in 2025 by Spokane-based publisher Latah Books. During an interview with KGMI, Friedman shared that his goal with the book was to advise against polarizing tactics in favor of more collaborative approaches to conservation. (Note: Friedman had publicly endorsed the same sentiment in a prior 1996 speech.) In a review for Conservation Confidential, Denis Hayes described Friedman as "a legend in the conservation community". Also in 2025, Friedman authored an article taking the controversial position that he "[supports] killing some barred owls" due to their role in the declining populations of northern spotted owls. (Note: Friedman's efforts to maintain spotted owl populations stretch back to at least 1986, when he participated in a protest about the cutting of spotted owl–habitat trees in Washington.)

=== Other activities ===
Friedman was a founding board member of Wildlands Network. Additionally, he was the subject of a 2012 article in The Seattle Times. He has sat on the Washington Department of Fish and Wildlife Budget and Policy Advisory Group since 2017.

== Personal life ==
While a conservationist, Friedman is also an occasional fisherman and deer hunter. A self-described "ironic hunter", he aims to shoots deer and elk from overpopulated herds. He has two adult daughters who were raised in Bellingham. Friedman now lives in Seattle with his wife Jackie.

Friedman also volunteers towards the cause of Ukraine defense. For this work, he has been named a "fella" by the North Atlantic Fella Organization.
