= Edward Lowenstein =

American architect

- Born: Edward Lowenstein; May 10, 1913; Chicago, Illinois, US
- Died: June 12, 1970 (aged 57); Greensboro, North Carolina
- Occupation: Architect
- Practice: Loewenstein-Atkinson

Edward Lowenstein (May 10, 1913 – June 12, 1970) was an American architect, widely known for his work across North Carolina, and especially his modernist home designs in the Greensboro area, as well as his ardent support of civil rights. He taught architecture at the state's women's college, now University of North Carolina at Greensboro (UNCG), and routinely hired and promoted black colleagues long before either were freely admitted to the profession.

== Background and career ==
Lowenstein was born in Chicago, the son of James B. and Aline G. Lowenstein (née Goldsmith). He attended Deerfield-Shields High School and graduated from MIT in 1935 with a BA in Architecture, later working as a draftsman for local firms before opening his own office in Highland Park, Illinois in 1938. Lowenstein subsequently served in the US Army Artillery Corp and the Army Corps of Engineers from 1941 to 1946, later moving to Greensboro with wife Francis Loewenstein (née Stern, 1913–1993), stepdaughter of textile giant Julius Cone, who assisted Lowenstein with his large social network. In 1953, he joined with Robert A. Atkinson Jr. to form the firm Loewenstein-Atkinson, becoming Lowenstein, Atkinson and Wilson in 1967.

Of the firms more than 1,600 commissions between 1946 and 1970, more than 500 were residential, and of those about 50 were Modernist designs.

Loewenstein was the first white architect in North Carolina to hire African-American architects, including William Streat in 1950, W. Edward (Blue) Jenkins, Major Sanders, Williex Merritt, and Clinton Gravely. Loewenstein was an active member of Governor Terry Sanford's North Carolina Commission on Civil Rights, and he taught architecture at the North Carolina College for Women (now UNC Greensboro); in 1958, he initiated a program where the female students designed a home, which was subsequently constructed, won a Duke Power Gold Medallion award for energy efficiency and was featured in McCall’s magazine.

With the design of his own home in Greensboro, the carport incorporated steel beams to accommodate a boat hoist, and the living room fireplace avoided a view-blocking vertical chimney by ventilating the fireplace via an underground duct to a chimney in the yard. Pursuing life-long self-directed education, Lowenstein carried around large tape recorders to learn Spanish and Italian — twice traveling to Italy to study Andrea Palladio. He served with the Cerebral Palsy Association, the Evergreens Retirement Home, the Greensboro Chamber of Commerce, the YMCA, on the board of the Greensboro Preservation Society.

Lowenstein suffered a minor heart attack in 1968, and suffered a fatal heart attack in 1970, while cleaning his home's gutters. He and his wife, Francis, had two daughters, Jane Lowenstein Levy and Laura Lowenstein Freedlander. In 1982, Lowenstein's wife, Francis, gave a $100,000 gift to the Weatherspoon Art Museum in Greensboro.

=== Legacy ===
Lowenstein's architectural work was featured in the New York Times, Architectural Record, and Good Housekeeping. In 2005, the Weatherspoon Art Museum at UNCG featured a retrospective of his work, titled The Lowenstein Legacy. In 2007, UNCG featured another retrospective, Close to Home: Edward Lowenstein and Modernism in Greensboro.

== Work ==
- Greensboro Public Library (1964)
- Dudley High School Gym
- Lowenstein-Levy residence, Granville Road, Greensboro
- 910 Sunset Drive, Greensboro
- 1903 Colonial Avenue, Greensboro
- 401 Kimberly Drive, Greensboro
