= Carol Roth =

American television and radio host

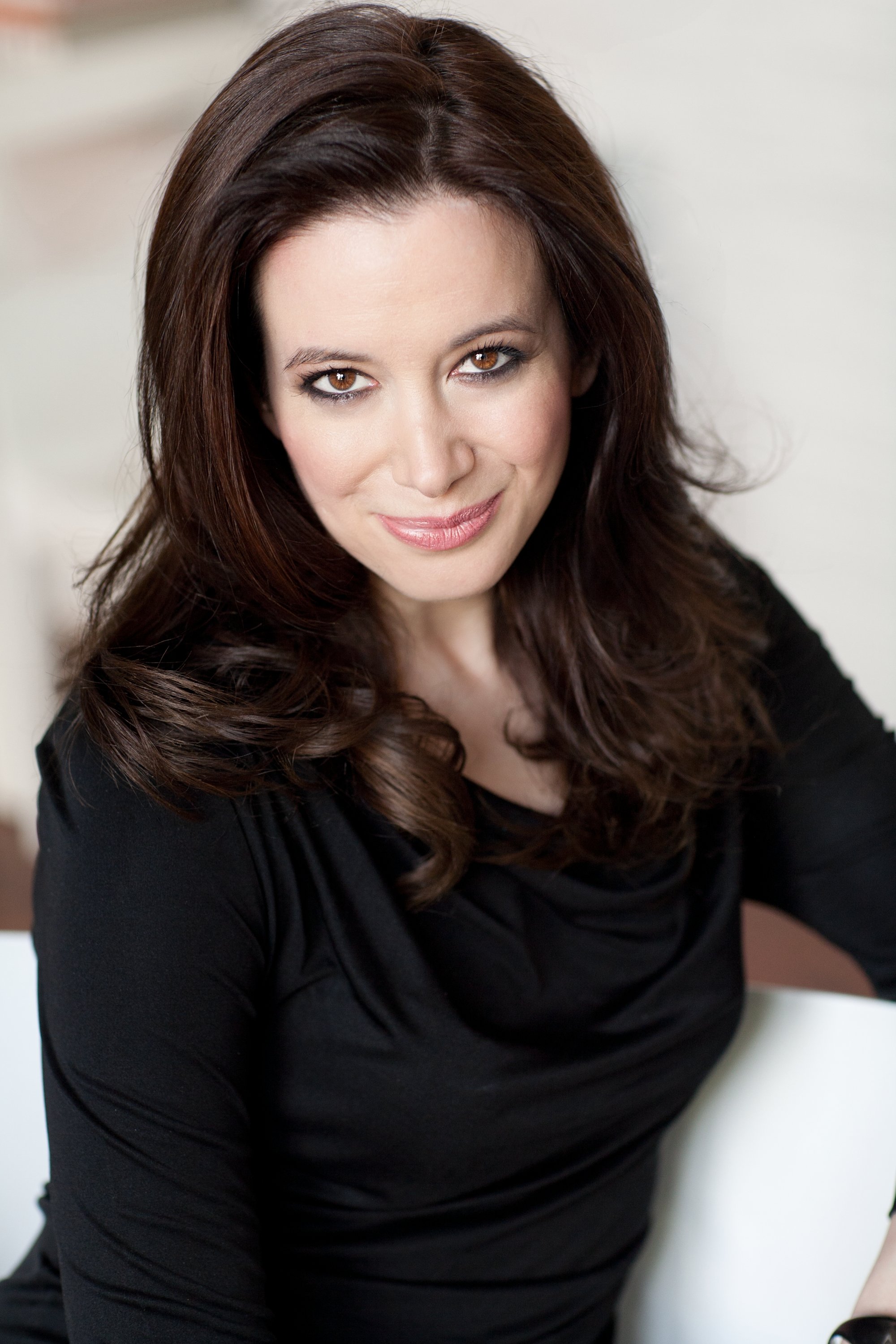
- Carol Roth (2012)
- Born: Carol J. Schneiderman Roth; 1973 (age 52–53); Chicago, Illinois, U.S.
- Education: Wharton School of the University of Pennsylvania
- Occupations: TV panelist and host, author, entrepreneur, investment banker
- Years active: 1995–present
- Notable work: The Entrepreneur Equation; The War on Small Business; You Will Own Nothing
- Television: America's Greatest Makers, Bulls & Bears, Cavuto Coast to Coast, Varney & Co, Piers Morgan Tonight, Closing Bell, Your Business, The Blaze
- Spouse: Kurt Roth (m. 1999)
- Website: www.carolroth.com

Carol J. Schneiderman Roth (born 1973) is an American television personality, bestselling author, entrepreneur, radio host, and investor. Roth appears regularly on national cable television networks including Fox Business, CNBC, CNN, Fox News and MSNBC. She was one of the judges on Mark Burnett's America's Greatest Makers television show and was a weekly panelist on the current events and business show Bulls & Bears. She was the host of WGN Radio's The Noon Show, and author of three books, including two New York Times bestsellers. As a self-styled "recovering" Investment Banker, she has completed more than $2 billion in capital raising, mergers & acquisitions and related transactions and invests in private companies.

== Early life ==
Roth was born in the northern suburbs of Chicago, Illinois and attended Deerfield High School. Her father Bernie was a retired union electrician (died in May 2013). Her parents divorced while she was in high school, and her mother Sheri died from leukemia in 1998, as did her step-mother from lung cancer in 2004. She attended the Wharton School of the University of Pennsylvania, and graduated magna cum laude in 1995.

== Career ==
Roth is an advocate for entrepreneurship and small business. She was named a Top 100 Small Business Influencer by Small Biz Trends in 2011 and again in 2012, 2013, 2014 and 2015. A number of her television segments and writings are related to small business and she was the event moderator for the New York Times Small Business Summit in 2012.

Roth also is a business advisor, investor and director. She has sat on a public company board and currently sits on the board of a private technology company.

Roth put out a legacy and wishes planning product called Future File, as a direct result of her father's death.

=== Investment banking ===
Roth joined San Francisco based investment bank Montgomery Securities in 1995 as a financial analyst and member of the consumer corporate finance team. She became an officer of the firm by age 25.

=== Book ===
Roth released her first book, The Entrepreneur Equation, in 2010. The book, which was listed on The New York Times, The Wall Street Journal and USA Today bestseller lists, won an Axiom Gold Medal Business book award. Reviewers particularly focused on the book's direct tone and highlight Roth's "reality checks" for readers. Initially, there was a controversy with buyers over the book's cover, which featured a picture of her, but she insisted on keeping it.

An action figure of Roth was created as a marketing prop to coincide with the release of The Entrepreneur Equation.

Roth's second book was The War on Small Business, chronicling the government's response to COVID and the epic transfer of wealth from Main Street to Wall Street that happened as a result of government policies.

Roth's most recent book, You Will Own Nothing, again making the New York Times, Wall Street Journal, Publishers Weekly and USA Today bestseller lists, looks at the forces holding back wealth creation opportunities for the middle class in America and around the world, and the often tyrannical forces pushing to curb wealth and freedoms as the global financial order shifts. The Next Big Idea Club recommended the book as a "must read" in its July 2023 issue. However, Kirkus Reviews had a critical review, calling the book an "alarmist manifesto" and questioning some anecdotes in it.

=== Television ===
Roth has been actively appearing on television since 2010. Roth was a permanent judge for the reality competition series America's Greatest Makers on TBS. She has been featured as a guest, co-host and panelist on a variety of national cable news networks, and has recurring roles on Fox Business' Bulls & Bears as a member of the panel.

She has also had recurring roles on Cavuto Coast-to-Coast, Making Money with Charles Payne, Varney&Co where she often appeared as a second-hour co-host, CNN's Piers Morgan Tonight, CNBC's Closing Bell, MSNBC's Your Business, Fox News' Fox & Friends, Fox News' America's Newsroom, Fox News' America Live with Megyn Kelly, Fox Business' The Tom Sullivan Show and Fox Business' The Willis Report. Her coverage of business, economic, political, and current events included discussion panel appearances during the United States 2012 elections. She has interviewed celebrities, presidential candidates and business leaders.

Roth hosted the final season of Microsoft's Office Small Business Academy.

Roth also appeared in the online series BOOKD, where she analyzed Michael Lewis' The Big Short alongside Steve Kroft of 60 Minutes, investor Peter Schiff and others.

=== Radio ===
Roth acts as a fill-in host and co-host for a variety of stations in Chicago and New York, including AM560 and 710WOR. Roth hosted "The Noon Show" on WGN Radio from January to June 2013. Previously, she co-hosted episodes of American Entrepreneur Radio with Suzanne Caplan, focused on entrepreneurship and business.

=== Movies ===
Roth appeared in a documentary movie about the auto-bailouts called Live Another Day.

=== Columns and articles ===
Roth writes regularly for a number of online publications, including op-ed columns at FoxNews.com and FoxBusiness.com. Previously, she had a featured blog called "Make Your Pitch" at The New York Times and blogs at the Huffington Post and Entrepreneur.com where she covered Business, Political, and Women's Issue postings. In 2011, Roth authored Sober Entrepreneurship, a manifesto which was published through Change This. She wrote an article for CNBC.com proposing the legalization of insider trading.

== Personal life ==
Roth lives with her husband in Chicago and is a Chicago Bears and NFL Football fan.
