= Rules of Attraction (Elkeles novel) =

2010 novel by Simone Elkeles

- First edition
- Author: Simone Elkeles
- Language: English and Spanish
- Series: Perfect Chemistry
- Subject: Romance, Mexican/American Family Life, Gang Affiliation (Fiction)
- Genre: Young Adult/Teen Romance
- Publisher: Walker Publishing Company Inc.
- Publication date: 2010
- Pages: 360
- Preceded by: Perfect Chemistry
- Followed by: Chain Reaction

Rules of Attraction is a 2010 young adult novel written by Simone Elkeles as the second installment of the Perfect Chemistry series. It spent three weeks on the New York Times Children's Best Seller List in 2010.

== Synopsis ==
The novel, Rules of Attraction is about Carlos Fuentes falling in love with Kiara Westford and the obstacles they face when trying to be together. He moves from Mexico to Boulder, Colorado to live with his brother Alex.(But not for long.) After he moved to Colorado he enrolls in Flatiron High School where he meets his peer guide Kiara Westford. Someone sets him up to be busted for possession of narcotics. He goes to a REACH program for troubled kids and lives with Alex's old college professor, Professor Westford, whose daughter is Kiara. He gets a set of rules from Professor Westford. “First off, no drugs or alcohol. As you already know, marijuana isn't hard to find in this city, but you have to stay clean per court order. Second, no profanity. I have a six-year-old who is very impressionable, and I don't need him hearing cuss words. Third, curfew on weekdays is midnight, on weekends it's two. Fourth, you're expected to clean up after yourself and help around the house when asked, just like our own children. Fifth, there's no TV unless you're done with homework. Sixth, if you bring a girl up to your room you must keep the door open . . . for obvious reasons.” Carlos tries to prank Kiara by acting like he's about to kiss her. They start to have feelings for each other. The two of them end up almost having sex, but Carlos stops it because he doesn't want to hurt her: “I have to get it out before I'm in too deep,” he says.

Carlos figures out who set him up with the narcotics bust: Wes Devlin. Carlos tries to fight Devlin's gang because they threatened his mother and brother Luis back in Mexico but gets injured badly. “I struggle against them, but each punch to my stomach is taking its toll and hurts like hell. When a fist connects with my jaw once, then twice, then three times, I taste blood. I’ve become their damn punching bag,” he explains The character Carlos decides he wants out of Devlin's gang because he doesn't want his gang connections to involve the Westford's and end up getting hurt because of him. After his decision he enlists the help of Professor Westford and his brother Alex. Professor Westford has one condition: “He will have to enter the military or go to college”. He ends up getting shot in the thigh while protecting Professor Westford. He decides to enlist in the military and make himself a better man for Kiara (“I'm goin’ to enlist. I want to make sure Kiara's got a boyfriend who has more to offer than a hot bod and a face that could make angels weep”).

The novel ends with Carlos and Kiara married for twenty years and have three daughters. Professor Westford ends up asking Carlos to take in a troubled teenager. In which he gives him a set of rules. “Uno, no drugs or alcohol. Dos, no profanity. I have three daughters and a wife, so keep it clean. Tres, curfew on weekdays is ten thirty; on weekends it's midnight. Cuatro, you're expected to clean up after yourself and help around the house when asked, just like our own children. Cinco, there's no TV unless you're done with homework. Seis . . .” He couldn't remember what his father-in-law's sixth rule was, but it didn't matter. Carlos had his own rule he wanted to make sure was stated loud and clear.“Dating Cecilia is out of the question, so don't even think about it. Any questions?”

== Characters ==
Carlos Fuentes - He is Alex Fuentes's younger brother and described as tall, handsome, and with a lot of tattoos. He is also a ladies’ man, but falls in love with Kiara Westford. He was in a gang back in Mexico to provide money and protection for his family, but tries to find a way out of it in order to become a better person.

Kiara Westford - She is a tomboy, smart, logical and also a grease monkey, having a hobby for fixing cars. She is Carlos Fuentes's love interest and the daughter of Professor Richard Westford. It is shown that she has a problem stuttering, but took speech therapy to try to get over it.

Professor Richard Westford - The husband of Colleen Westford and father of Kiara and Brandon Westford. He takes in troubled kids to try to change their lives for the better and works with the DEA sometimes for psychological evaluation. He was convinced by Alex to take Carlos in when it looked like he may not have any other place to go. He had lost his parents and little brother in a car accident and was the only survivor as a young child. As a result of accident, he was left on the streets and in and out of foster care before eventually enlisting in the military. After revealing his past to Carlos, he helps him get out the Devlin's gang and gives him his blessing to be with Kiara on the condition he either goes to college or enlist in the military.

Wes Devlin - A “business man” who recruited Carlos Fuentes into his gang instead of killing him because he need connection to Mexican drug dealers.

Alex Fuentes - A changed man and boyfriend of Brittney Ellis. He is the older brother of Carlos Fuentes. He was previously a gang member and almost involved in drugs before he changed for his girlfriend. In the novel, he attends Colorado State University and tries to help Carlos stay out of trouble.

Brittany Ellis - The girlfriend of Alex Fuentes. She has a disabled sister whom she looks after. Her parents don't approve of her relationship with Alex on account of his history, which leads them to break up in the novel. However, they end up getting back together after deciding to stay together with or without her parents approval.

Tuck - Kiara Westford's gay best friend. He loves to tease and pick on Carlos, much to his annoyance.

Colleen Westford - A tea fanatic, wife of Professor Richard Westford, mother of Kiara, and Brandon Westford. She opened a tea store named Hospitali-Tea.

Brandon Westford - The six-year-old brother of Kiara who looks up to Carlos. He loves to play with Carlos and looks up to him like an older brother.

Nick - A drug dealer who also uses the drug he sells. It's revealed that he had planted the drugs in Carlos's locker.

Ramiro Garcia - The best friend of Carlos Fuentes who had once dated Madison Stone.

Madison Stone - A pretty and popular girl with a mean streak. She was attracted to Carlos and almost has sex with him. He soon finds out that she was only using Carlos to make her ex-boyfriend, Ram Garcia, jealous.

Destiny - Carlos's ex-girlfriend who he ponders about from time to time. The two had been madly in love before they broke up because they didn't want a long-distance relationship.

Luis Fuentes - The youngest brother of Alex and Carlos Fuentes. He is known as 'the good son'.

Mrs. Fuentes - A worried mother who lost her husband when Carlos was four. She had Alex at sixteen years old because she wanted nothing more than to be a mother. As a result of her unstable life, she often worries about her kids getting in danger.

Michael Barra - He is Kiara's ex-boyfriend who broke up with her via text message. Carlos and Michael almost got into a fight because of Kiara. He has an odd passion for his hair.

Mrs. Garcia - A DEA agent, and mother of Ramiro “Ram” Garcia. She told Kiara of Carlos working with the DEA and her father's involvement with the DEA.

== Reception and style ==
Rules of Attraction received mostly positive reviews. A critic from the Multicultural Review wrote, “The dialogue is witty and realistic, the characters authentic, and the setting of Boulder, Colorado, is described in much detail” Likewise, the School Library Journal noted the novel's appeal to teens, stating that Elkeles “delivers a steamy page-turner bound to make teen swoon” The novel is notable in teen fiction for its ability to “help to tear down ... stereotypes in a manner that is both funny and genuine.” Indeed, Rules of Attraction suggests that cultural differences do not have to be a problem for today's youth.

Despite its realism and appeal to a teen audience, the story was critiqued as being “contrived and rushed, and minor character are not as well developed”

Rules of Attraction is written in the alternating narrative voices of Carlos and Kiara. It is also notable for its use of “brother dialogue... infused with plenty of Spanish, but clear in context.”

== Bibliography ==
- Elkeles, Simone (2011). Rules of Attraction. New York: Walker Publishing Company. pp. 326. ISBN 978-0-8027-2085-6.
