= 2006 Columbus Destroyers season =

Arena Football League team season

- Head coach: Doug Kay
- Home stadium: Nationwide Arena

Results
- Record: 8–8
- Division place: 4th Eastern
- Playoffs: did not qualify
- Team DPY: Jerald Brown

The 2006 Columbus Destroyers season was the 8th season for the franchise, and its 3rd in Columbus, Ohio. They finished the season with an 8–8 record.

== Schedule ==
| Week | Date | Opponent | Home/Away Game | Result |

== Coaching ==
Doug Kay started his first season as head coach of the Destroyers.
