= Gad Zeevi =

Israeli industrialist

- גד זאבי
- Born: 13 November 1939 (age 86)
- Occupations: Industrialist, businessman
- Known for: Ownership of Zeevi Group, investments in petroleum, real estate, power stations, and online skill gaming
- Title: Owner and chairman of the Zeevi Group

Gad Zeevi (Hebrew: גד זאבי, also Gad Zevi; born November 13, 1939) is an Israeli industrialist. Zeevi is the owner and chairman of the Zeevi Group, a multimillion-dollar private equity corporation. The Zeevi Group, through its subsidiaries, deals with petroleum products and manages petroleum refineries and a chain of gas stations in the United States. The company also engages in electric power stations, and construction of residential real estate. trade centers, utilities and roads in Africa, America, and Israel, In addition, the Zeevi Group provides information technologies, logistical, retailing, and other business services, as well as medical equipment.

== Career ==
Gad Zeevi controls Play4Skill, after investing $2.1 million in it in 2009. Play4Skill's business model is based on fee games that include on-site advertising, as well as games for pay. The company is developing an additional B2B business model to license its products to portals and online games sites.

== Legal Problems & Acquittal ==
In March 2011, The Tel Aviv Magistrate's Court acquitted Gad Ze'evi and three other executives from Malam of charges of fraud.

The trial against Ze'evi lasted five years and included dozens of court hearings. Ze'evi who was chairman of IT giant Malam Systems was indicted in 2006 of committing stock fraud in order to increase his monthly salary. In her closing remarks, Judge Daniela Cherizli criticized the local Israeli district attorneys office for drawing out the trial unnecessarily.

"I am not going into personal issues. I kept the verdict professional and objective, even though I strongly wanted to say what I thought during the hearing. Things could have been much shorter," Judge Cherizli told the prosecutors. "I did not halt the hearing only out of the respect that I have for the prosecution. It was really irrelevant."

Judge Cherizli added that the legal material was clear, and so was the required verdict. "At the end of the day, everything focused on the issue of the shares. I made no normative statement whether the shares were tainted or not, but I think that act by the accused was neither false nor unreasonable. I thoroughly examined all the material. In general, I think that Mr. Tiber did not err according to the specific material in this case." Judge Cherizli also criticized the Israel Securities Authority for not providing an opinion on the case. "I would have expected the Securities Authority to express an opinion, but it did not do so, so what I am expected to do? The grounds for a charge of fraudulent receiving have been undercut. More than necessary, I discussed the question whether there were misleading details in the various documents. There was no conspiracy, and I therefore acquit the accused of all charges in the indictment."
