= Lindsay Knapp =

American football player (born 1970)

No. 65
- Position: Guard

Personal information
- Born: February 25, 1970 (age 56); Arlington Heights, Illinois, U.S.
- Listed height: 6 ft 6 in (1.98 m)
- Listed weight: 300 lb (136 kg)

Career information
- High school: Deerfield (Deerfield, Illinois)
- College: Notre Dame (1988–1992)
- NFL draft: 1993: 5th round, 130th overall pick

Career history
- Kansas City Chiefs (1993–1994); Green Bay Packers (1995–1996)

Awards and highlights
- Super Bowl champion (XXXI)

Career NFL statistics
- Games played: 11
- Stats at Pro Football Reference

Lindsay Haines Knapp (born February 25, 1970) is an American former professional football player who was a guard in the National Football League (NFL). He played college football for the Notre Dame Fighting Irish and was selected by the Kansas City Chiefs in the fifth round of the 1993 NFL draft. Knapp spent two years with the Chiefs and two with the Green Bay Packers, although he only played in one season for each team. He was a part of the Packers' Super Bowl XXXI championship team.

== Early life ==
Knapp was born on February 25, 1970, in Arlington Heights, Illinois, U.S. He attended Deerfield High School where he played football. Knapp was a two-way lineman at Deerfield and was named all-state and the state's Gatorade Player of the Year as a senior in 1987. Knapp was a Parade All-American. He also played basketball, earning two letters, and set the school records in single-game and single-season rebounds. After high school, Knapp signed to play college football for the Notre Dame Fighting Irish under coach Lou Holtz as an offensive guard.

During high school, Knapp once appeared in a commercial for the McDonald's All-American Game playing basketball against Michael Jordan.

== College career ==
Knapp joined Notre Dame in 1988 and was a member of their national championship team that year, but saw no playing time. At the start of his career, he was considered undersized, weighing 240 pounds (110 kg), but he later increased his size to 293 pounds (133 kg) at Notre Dame. Knapp appeared in six games as a backup in 1989, then started his first game at offensive tackle in 1990. He became a full-time starter for the Fighting Irish in 1991. He graduated from Notre Dame with a bachelor's degree in economics in 1991 but returned for the 1992 season, having an extra year of eligibility due to not playing in 1988. Knapp remained starter in his last year, 1992, helping Notre Dame average 276 rushing yards per game, a mark that placed third nationally. He was named a College & Pro Football Newsweekly All-American for the 1992 season.

== Professional career ==
Knapp was selected by the Kansas City Chiefs in the fifth round (130th overall) of the 1993 NFL draft. He was released on August 30, 1993, and then re-signed to the practice squad the next day. Knapp was activated from the practice squad on September 24, but did not appear in any games during the 1993 season. He made the team in 1994 as a backup tackle but only appeared in two games. Prior to the 1995 regular season, Knapp was traded to the Green Bay Packers for an undisclosed draft pick. He was inactive for the entire 1995 season. Knapp returned to the Packers in 1996 as a backup guard and appeared in nine games, being a member of their Super Bowl XXXI championship team. He was considered the leading candidate to serve as the team's third-string guard during the 1997 season but was injured in training camp and later released on August 19, 1997. Knapp did not play for any other team and finished his NFL career with 11 games played, all as a backup.

After Knapp's football career, he worked as a bond salesman. He married and had three children.
