= America's Greatest Makers =

- Narrated by: Sarah Grace Wright
- Country of origin: United States
- Original language: English

Production
- Executive producers: Mark Burnett; James Carwana; Dean Houser; James Jackson; Brett Lyons
- Production companies: MGM Television; Intel

Original release
- Network: TBS
- Release: April 5 – May 24, 2016

America's Greatest Makers is a reality television show that aired in 2016 on TBS. Twenty-four teams of Makers compete for a $1 million prize. The judging panel consists of Intel CEO Brian Krzanich, Kevin Pereira, and Carol Roth. It was produced by Emmy-award winning producer Mark Burnett and MGM Television. A second season was announced in 2017 but canceled soon after casting.

Guest judges include: Kenny Smith, Mayim Bialik, Shaquille O'Neal, Massimo Banzi and Mike Rowe. The show also had an in-depth second screen presence on their website with video segments hosted by Cara Santa Maria and guest correspondent Chris Hardwick of Nerdist. The show included 24 teams with design, hardware, software and business mentors. Design mentors included: Imaan Naeem, Aubrey Shick, and Kurin Tu. Mechanical/hardware mentors included: Nahid Alam, Shallu Bhalla, James Crocker, Norvin Cuentas, Alex Juern and Greg Spilman. Software mentors included: Oliver Chen, Michael DiGioia, Mike Duong, David Fickel, Dan Hugo, Bryan Levin, Pirooz Najafi, and Prem Seelin. Business mentors included Andre Marquis and Mark Searle from UC Berkeley. Anubha Sacheti and Team Grush won the show.

== Season 1: Teams, inventions and eliminations ==
Team	Invention	Episode Eliminated
ASEAH	Delta Glove	Episode 8
Aurora Dreamphones	Aurora Dreamphones	Episode 6
Mohyi Labs/Bladeless Drone	Bladeless Drone	Episode 2
CAT Clutch	CAT Clutch	Episode 2
Chroma Colour	Chroma Colour	Episode 2
Collarator	Collarator	Episode 7
Grush	Grush	Won
HandsON	HandsON	Episode 8
HerdDogg	HerdDogg	Episode 5
MotivateMe	MotivateMe	Episode 6
NWTN	NWTN	Episode 8
Povi	Povi	Episode 1
PowerBobber	PowerBobber	Episode 6
SAV3ST	SAV3ST	Episode 2
SlapBand	SlapBand	Episode 5
SwimART	SwimART	Episode 2
Tabor	The Quill	Episode 4
Tandm	Tandm	Episode 1
Telekinesis	Telekinesis	Episode 3
Transfiguration Bustle	Transfiguration Bustle	Episode 1
VENN	VENN	Episode 3
Weighitz	Weighitz	Episode 1
WithMe	WithMe	Episode 4
Zackees Fashion Glow Jewelry	Zackees Fashion Glow Jewelry	Episode 7

== Season 1 episodes ==
=== Episode 1 ===
The series premiere aired on April 5, 2016, on TBS. It aired at 9 pm PDT/EDT (8 pm Central). The episode was part 1 of 2, featuring 12 teams of makers as they presented their inventions to the judges and guest judge Kenny Smith. Of the 12 teams, 4 were eliminated leaving 7 spots open for the next 12 teams that would present their inventions in episode 2.

=== Episode 2 ===
This episode aired on April 12, 2016, and was a continuation of Episode 1 where the final 12 teams presented their ideas to the judges and guest judge Kenny Smith. Of the 12 teams 5 were eliminated. This meant that 15 teams were moving onto the "Make or Break" round. In this stage the teams will compete against each other in groups of three, with $100,000 on the line every week for the winning team. After the five weeks of this round, we will end up with 5 finalists who make it to the final round and the chance to win $1,000,000

=== Episode 3 ===
Episode 3 was the first round of the "Make or Break" stage, and aired on April 19, 2016. Mayim Bialik was a guest judge. VENN and Telekinesis were eliminated, and Grush, with a smart toothbrush, won the round and moved on to the finals.

=== Episode 4 ===
The second round of the "Make or Break" stage aired on April 26, 2016. Massimo Banzi, cofounder of Arduino, was a guest judge. ASEAH's Delta Glove which automatically identifies and tracks the kind of exercise its user performs won the round and $100,000, and moved on to the finals. WithMe and Tabor were eliminated.

=== Episode 5 ===
In the third "Make or Break" round, team NWTN competed with HerdDogg and SlapBand, and walked away the winner. The show aired on May 3, 2016.

=== Episode 6 ===
The fourth "Make or Break" round aired on May 10, 2016. Shaquille O'Neal was a guest judge. The episode pitted Aurora Dreamphones, PowerBobber and MotivateMe against each other. PowerBobber won the round and $100,000, and joined NWTN, Grush and ASEAH in the finals.

=== Episode 7 ===
The fifth and final "Make or Break" round aired on May 17, 2016, with Shaquille O'Neal again as a guest judge. The final winner of this stage was team HandsOn, which beat out Zackees Fashion Glow Jewelry and Collarator, and advanced as the last contender to the final round.

=== Episode 8 ===
Episode 8 was the finale of the first season. It aired on May 24, 2016. In the finale, the 5 winners of the previous 'Make or Break' rounds - Grush, NWTN, ASEAH, PowerBobber and HandsOn - competed against each other for the grand prize of $1,000,000. The teams all presented their inventions one last time to the panel of judges, which included special judges Kenny Smith and Mike Rowe. The winner of season one's grand prize was Grush. Team Grush- Dr. Anubha Sacheti, Ethan Schur and Yong Jing Wang.
