= Chicago Live! =

- Genre: News/entertainment, variety show
- Running time: 60 min.
- Country of origin: United States
- Language(s): English
- Home station: WGN Radio
- Hosted by: Rick Kogan
- Executive producer(s): Kelly Leonard, Lara Weber
- Recording studio: Chicago, Illinois
- Original release: October 2010 – 2013
- Website: Website
- Podcast: Podcast

Chicago Live! is an hour-long stage and radio variety show hosted by Chicago newspaperman and radio personality Rick Kogan. The multi-platform show is produced by the Chicago Tribune in partnership with The Second City and broadcasts on WGN Radio 720-AM Saturday nights at 11 p.m. It is taped in front of a live studio audience. Short, individual segments from each show are distributed in video and podcast format.

== History ==
Chicago Live! debuted at the Chicago Theatre Downstairs on October 14, 2010, and continued recording and airing in six-week seasons through 2011. Chicago Live! performed live in 2011 at the Haymarket Pub & Brewery place. Billy Corgan was a guest on the show in 2011. In November 2011, Chicago Live! announced that it would shift to eight-week seasons in 2012 and move to the Up Comedy Club in Chicago's Old Town neighborhood. John Conroy was a guest on the show in 2012. Chicago Live! was still active in 2013. In 2013 Kathy and Judy of WGN Radio were guests on the show.

Notable guests have included Chicago Mayor Rahm Emanuel, musician Billy Corgan, former White House Social Secretary Desirèe Rogers, Sesame Street puppet Cookie Monster and rapper Lupe Fiasco.

Lara Weber does the production work for the show.

== Format ==
As described by host Rick Kogan, the show's mission is to "bring the paper in its wonderful variety on stage."

Each episode of Chicago Live! includes:

- Interviews with Chicago newsmakers and entertainers
- Topical comedy from The Second City
- Almanac segment in which Rick Kogan presents stories, videos around a selected year in Chicago history
- Performances by Chicago artists and entertainers
