= List of cooperatives =

This is a list of notable co-operative enterprises by country. Co-operatives are business organizations owned and operated by a group of individuals for their mutual benefit. For a list of Co-operative Federations, please see List of co-operative federations.

== Africa ==
=== Kenya ===
- Mwalimu Cooperative Savings & Credit Society Limited, the largest savings and credit cooperative society (Sacco), in Kenya
- Unaitas Sacco Society Limited, established 1993

=== Uganda ===
- Wazalendo Savings and Credit Cooperative Society (WASACCO)

== Asia ==
=== India ===
- Amul
- Indian Farmers Fertiliser Cooperative (IFFCO)

=== Indonesia ===
- Red and White Cooperative, an Indonesian government cooperative program for village and subdistrict levels.

=== Japan ===
- Co-op Kobe, officially known as Consumer Co-operative Kobe, is a consumers' cooperative.

=== Philippines ===
- Lighthouse Cooperative, a multi-purpose cooperative in Tuguegarao City, Cagayan, established in 1998.
- Tagum Cooperative- a cooperative from Tagum City

== Europe ==
=== Denmark ===
- Coop amba

=== Finland ===
- Metsäliitto
- OP-Pohjola Group
- S-Group
- Valio

=== France ===
- Crédit Agricole
- Enercoop, electricity supplier.

=== Germany ===
- Edeka Group, supermarket corporation consisting of several co-operatives of independent supermarkets.

=== Italy ===
- Coop, Italian consumers' cooperatives operating a supermarket chain.

=== Ireland ===
- Dublin Food Co-op, vegetarian food co-op dealing primarily in organic wholefood produce.
- Dairygold Co-Operative Society Limited, dairy co-op.
- Ornua, agricultural co-op for dairy processors and farmers.

=== Poland ===
- Społem is a Polish consumers' co-operative of local grocery stores founded in 1868.

=== Scandinavia ===
- Arla Foods is a Swedish-Danish cooperative based in Aarhus, Denmark, and the largest producer of dairy products in Scandinavia.
- Coop Norden (Coop Nordic) was a joint Scandinavian purchasing company that in 2007 dissolved and devolved to the constituent national cooperatives.
- Kvinnornas Andelsförening Svenska Hem, women's food cooperative, founded in Sweden 1905.

=== Spain ===
- Mondragón Cooperative Corporation, federation of worker cooperatives in the Basque region.
  - Eroski, supermarket chain.

=== Sweden ===
- Kooperativa Förbundet
- Kvinnornas Andelsförening Svenska Hem

=== Switzerland ===
- Migros
- Coop (Switzerland)
- Raiffeisen (Switzerland)

=== United Kingdom, Channel Islands and Isle of Man ===
- Baywind Energy Co-operative
- Brighton Energy Co-operative
- Co-operative Press
- Daily Bread Co-operative
- Edinburgh Bicycle Co-operative
- Edinburgh Student Housing Co-operative
- Highburton Co-operative Society
- Ilkeston Co-operative Society
- Ipswich Industrial Co-operative Society formed 1868 now merged
- London Capital Credit Union
- New Internationalist
- People's Press Printing Society
- The Phone Co-op
- Plymouth and South West Co-operative Society
- Revolver Co-operative
- Ruskin House
- Shared Interest
- Suma Wholefoods
- Swann Morton worker co-op
- The Co-operative Group has 22 independent consumer co-operatives as corporate members or customer owners, including:
  - Central England Co-operative
  - Channel Islands Co-operative Society
  - Chelmsford Star Co-operative Society
  - East of England Co-operative Society
  - Heart of England Co-operative Society
  - Lincolnshire Co-operative
  - The Midcounties Co-operative
  - Penrith Co-operative Society
  - Radstock Co-operative Society
  - Scottish Midland Co-operative Society
  - Southern Co-operative
- Unicorn Grocery
- Veggies of Nottingham
- Westmill Solar Co-operative
- Westmill Wind Farm Co-operative

Football and rugby union supporters' trusts are incorporated as co-operatives of supporters. Several own the football club outright and many hold equity in the club.

== North America ==
- Los Horcones, a Mexican producer cooperative and Walden Two (an experimental community)
- UBPC, a group of cooperatives all around Cuba that’s mostly used for agriculture, similar to a CPA
- CPA, a group of cooperatives all around Cuba that’s mostly used for agriculture, similar to a UBPC

== Canada ==
- Blocks Recording Club (record label)
- Canadian Press (newswire)
- Canadian University Press (newswire for student newspapers)
- The Co-operators, founded in 1945, is an insurance co-operative owned by 43 members.
- Federated Co-operatives, a co-operative federation providing procurement, distribution, and retail products (see Co-op Refinery Complex) to member co-operatives
- Farmers of North America, farmers buying co-operative.
- Home Hardware is a privately held home improvement, construction materials, and furniture retailer.
- Stocksy United (Stocksy) is a multi-stakeholder platform cooperative, selling stock photos and videos on behalf of its artist contributors.

=== Alberta ===
- Alberta Wheat Pool
- Calgary Co-op (retail co-op)
- United Farmers of Alberta (UFA) is an agricultural supply cooperative headquartered in Calgary, Alberta, Canada, with over 120,000 members and with 2007 revenues of over $1.8 billion, UFA is ranked as the 37th largest business in Alberta by revenue according to Alberta Venture magazine.

=== British Columbia ===
- Aaron Webster Housing Cooperative (formerly Cityview Co-op) is a housing cooperative located in Vancouver.
- CJLY-FM, radio station in Nelson, British Columbia.
- CFRO-FM, licensed and owned by Vancouver Co-operative Radio, is a non-commercial community radio station in Vancouver.
- Otter Co-op is a consumers' cooperative in Aldergrove.
- Tru Cooperative Bank
- Vancouver City Savings Credit Union (Vancity)

=== Manitoba ===
- Red River Co-op (Winnipeg)

=== New Brunswick ===
- Co-op Atlantic (Moncton)

=== Ontario ===
- Canadian University Press is a non-profit co-operative and newswire service owned by almost 90 student newspapers at post-secondary schools in Canada.
- Gay Lea Foods Co-operative Limited is a dairy products company.
- Organic Meadow Cooperative is an agricultural cooperative in Ontario.
- Rochdale College, Toronto (defunct)
- St-Albert Cheese Co-operative
- Sudbury Indie Cinema Co-op
- Toronto Renewable Energy Co-operative
- Wireless Nomad was a non-profit cooperative based in Toronto providing subscriber-owned home and business internet along with free Wi-Fi wireless Internet access the 70+ nodes, making it one of the largest free Wi-Fi networks in the country at the time.

=== Prince Edward Island ===
- Amalgamated Dairies Limited (Summerside)

=== Quebec ===
- Agropur is an Agricultural cooperative headquartered in Longueuil, Quebec.
- Desjardins Group

=== Saskatchewan ===
- Access Communications is a telecommunication co-operative
- CFCR-FM – Community Radio Station (Saskatoon)
- Innovation Federal Credit Union
- Saskatoon Co-op (Saskatoon)
- Saskatoon Farmers' Market (Saskatoon)
- Sherwood Co-op (Regina)
- Southern Rails Cooperative (railway)

== United States ==
- 21st Street Co-op, student housing co-operative in Austin, Texas
- Ace Hardware, Oak Brook, Illinois
- Affiliated Foods Midwest Co-op Inc.
- Affiliated Foods Southwest
- AgFirst Farm Credit Bank
- AgriBank
- Ant Hill Cooperative
- Arizmendi Bakery, San Francisco, California
- Associated Food Stores
- Associated Grocers of Florida, Inc
- Associated Grocers of the South, Inc.
- Associated Grocers, Inc.
- Associated Press
- Associated Wholesale Grocers
- Associated Wholesalers, Inc.
- Audubon Mutual Housing Corporation
- Basin Electric Power Cooperative
- Berkeley Student Cooperative
- BECU
- Black Star Co-op, a brewpub in Austin, TX
- Blue Diamond Growers
- Bob's Red Mill
- Brown Association for Cooperative Housing
- Cabot Creamery, Vermont-based dairy marketing
- CCA Global Partners
- Central Grocers Cooperative
- Certified Grocers Midwest
- Choptank Electric Cooperative
- CHS Inc.
- Coastal Federal Credit Union
- CoBank
- Co-operative Central Exchange
- Cooperative Development Foundation
- Dairy Farmers of America
- Dairylea Cooperative Inc.
- Delta and Providence Cooperative Farms
- Diamond Walnut Growers, Inc.
- Do It Best
- Elevations Credit Union
- Equal Exchange
- Farm Credit Bank of Texas
- First Tech Credit Union
- Florida's Natural Growers (formerly Citrus World Inc.)
- Florists' Transworld Delivery (FTD)
- Freedom Farm Cooperative, an agricultural cooperative founded in 1967
- Full Sail Brewing Company
- George Street Co-op
- Great River Energy
- Greenbelt Homes, Inc.
- Greenbelt News Review
- Group Health Cooperative
- GROWMARK, Inc.
- Harvard/MIT Cooperative Society
- Inter-Cooperative Council at the University of Michigan (Ann Arbor MI)
- Land O'Lakes
- Madison Community Co-op
- MFA Incorporated
- Michigan State University Student Housing Cooperative
- National Cooperative Bank (now NCB)
- National Cooperative Business Association (NCBA)
- National Grape Cooperative Association, Inc.
- National Rural Utilities Cooperative Finance Corporation
- Navy Federal Credit Union
- New Deal Cafe
- New Mexico Educators Federal Credit Union
- Nebraska Rural Radio Association
- Northcountry Cooperative Development Fund
- Oberlin Student Cooperative Association
- Ocean Spray (cooperative)
- Oglethorpe Power Corporation
- Old Dominion Electric Cooperative
- PCC Community Markets
- Park Slope Food Coop
- Pentagon Federal Credit Union
- People's Food Co-op (Portland)
- Piggly Wiggly Alabama
- Pioneer Telephone Cooperative (Oklahoma)
- Pioneer Telephone Cooperative (Oregon)
- Princeton Cooperative
- R.E.I. (Recreational Equipment Inc.)
- Rapidan Camps<
- Riceland Foods
- Scary Cow Productions
- Snake River Sugar Company
- Southern Maryland Electric Cooperative
- Southern States Cooperative
- Sunkist Growers, Inc.
- Tennessee Farmers Cooperative
- The Union Credit Union
- Tillamook County Creamery Association
- Topco Associates
- U.S. AgBank, FCB
- U.S. Central Credit Union
- Unified Western Grocers
- USA Federal Credit Union (San Diego, Ca)
- United Hardware Distributing Company (Hardware Hank)
- Universal Cooperatives
- URM Stores
- VHA, Inc.
- Wakefern Food Corporation
- Weaver's Way Co-op
- Weaver Street Market
- Wedge Community Co-op
- Welch's (Welch Foods Inc.)
- Western Family Holding Company
- Western Sugar Cooperative
- WestFarm Foods
- Wheatsville Co-op
- Whole Foods Co-op
- Winfield Park Mutual Housing Corporation
- WSIPC

== Oceania ==
=== Australia ===
- Dairy Farmers is one of the largest and oldest dairy manufacturers in Australia, established in 1900, supplying products to local and international markets such as Eastern Europe, the Middle East and Asia. Kirin Holdings Company, Limited of Japan, via its subsidiary National Foods, acquired the company on 27 November 2008. The Co-op later being listed up for sale in 2019 and later sold on January 25, 2021 to the wholly owned Australian company Bega Cheese.
- CBH Group and Wesfarmers both started as co-operative groups in Western Australia in the early twentieth century.

=== New Zealand ===
- Electricity Ashburton
- Farmers' Mutual Group
- Fonterra Co-operative Group
- Foodstuffs (Auckland) Cooperative
- Foodstuffs South Island Cooperative
- Foodstuffs (Wellington) Cooperative
- Mitre 10
- Nelson Building Society
- Paper Plus Group
- Silver Fern Farms
- SBS Bank
- Southern Cross Medical Care Society
- Tatua Cooperative Dairy Company
- The Co-operative Bank
- Westland Cooperative Dairy Company

== See also ==
- List of co-operative federations
- List of employee-owned companies
- List of energy cooperatives
- List of food cooperatives
- List of retailers' cooperatives
- List of worker cooperatives
