= Pioneer Telephone Cooperative =

Pioneer Telephone Cooperative may refer to:

- Pioneer Telephone Cooperative (Oklahoma)
- Pioneer Telephone Cooperative (Oregon)
