= Revolver Co-operative =

UK based co-operative coffee distributor

Revolver Co-operative Limited
- Type: Multi-stakeholder cooperative
- Industry: Coffee, clothing
- Founded: 2011
- Headquarters: Wolverhampton, United Kingdom
- Website: revolver.coop

Revolver Co-operative, trading under the brand Revolver World, is a cooperative based in Wolverhampton, United Kingdom that imports and markets Fairtrade-certified coffee and organic cotton goods. It is a sister organisation to Revolver Music.

== Structure ==
Revolver Co-operative is incorporated as an industrial and provident society under the Industrial and Provident Societies Act 1965. It is a multistakeholder co-operative in that membership is open to both suppliers, such as the farmer cooperatives, as well as consumers and other private individuals.

== Activities ==
Revolver Co-operative sells direct via its website, and via the retail outlets of consumer co-operatives (such as Central England Co-operative, Midcounties Co-operative, Heart of England Co-operative and Penrith Co-operative) and worker co-operatives (such as Unicorn Grocery and Infinity Foods Workers Co-operative).

It sources Fairtrade coffee direct from farming cooperatives in Brazil, Colombia, Tarrazú in Costa Rica, Cuba, Ethiopia, Guatemala, Honduras, Mexico, Peru, Tanzania, and Uganda. By way of the Fairtrade premium paid to the farmers, 25% of profits are reinvested into the producers' communities to improve health and education.
