= Stephen Thompson (football chairman) =

Scottish businessman (born 1965/66)

Stephen Thompson (born 1965 or 1966) is a Scottish businessman, who was the chairman of Scottish football club Dundee United. He is the son of former United chairman Eddie Thompson, who died of prostate cancer in October 2008. Stephen Thompson then succeeded to the chair of Dundee United, a position he held until March 2018.

== Involvement with Dundee United ==
Thompson joined the Dundee United board in 2002 whilst taking on the role as Marketing Director at Morning, Noon and Night. His father Eddie Thompson was the founder and Chief executive at Morning, Noon and Night and also the chairman of Dundee United. In February 2008, his father promoted him as chief executive with immediate effect. Following the 2010 Scottish Cup victory, Thompson says he dedicated the cup to his late father.

Thompson told BBC Scotland that the Old Firm leaving Scottish Premier League could damage the Scotland's top flight. Thompson was an opponent of the proposal to reduce the Scottish Premier League from 12 clubs to 10.

Thompson was also a member of the board of the Scottish Premier League until his resignation in late November 2012, citing "professional differences". The resignation was explained over a clash with Ralph Topping and claims over leaking sensitive information.

In February 2014, Thompson managed to help the club pay off their debt to the bank, the club have loaned. The announcement were welcomed by financial experts. In the years prior to this, the club had sold Johnny Russell to Derby County for £750,000 and David Goodwillie to Blackburn Rovers for £2 million. Thompson says he was able to mend the club's mistakes during his father reign as the chairman and now handled their finance.

In September 2014, Thompson revealed an investor was interested in buying the club earlier in the year, however, the approach was rejected. The club was relegated to the Scottish Championship in 2016, after they finished last in the 2015–16 Scottish Premiership.

Dundee United announced in January 2018 that Thompson would be stepping down as chairman at the end of the 2017–18 season. Thompson resigned in March 2018, and announced his intention to sell his shareholding in the club.
