= Wireless Nomad =

Wireless Nomad was a for-profit cooperative based in Toronto, Canada providing subscriber-owned home and business Internet access along with free Wi-Fi wireless Internet access and music to over a hundred nodes, making it the largest free Wi-Fi network in the country at the time. It was founded by Steve Wilton and Damien Fox in January, 2005 and turned its DSL internet connections over to private Internet service provider (ISP) TekSavvy in March 2009. All WiFi nodes were subsequently shut down.

Instead of using Bell Sympatico's or Rogers Cable's retail high-speed Internet access services to provide service to their wireless access points, they were their own ISP under Canadian Radio-television and Telecommunications Commission (CRTC) rules that compel large providers like Rogers and Bell to resell their local loop cable and DSL circuits to smaller ISPs at a regulated (tariffed) price. At the time of its disbanding in mid-2009, WN charged Can$36.95+GST per month to members who signed up for home Internet service (3~5 Mbit/s down/720 kbit/s up), which was less than Bell and Rogers charged for their high-speed Internet access service. WN Business service was $59.95 a month. Wireless Nomad was one of the few ISPs in Canada that did not ban its residential subscribers from operating servers. Port 25 was also open for outgoing traffic.

The service covered several areas, mainly in downtown Toronto. In October 2006, inspired by the fictional narrative in Cory Doctorow's Someone Comes to Town, Someone Leaves Town, the co-op deployed a large antenna in Toronto's Kensington Market, covering about one quarter of the neighborhood with free WiFi Internet. The antenna and WiFi gear was removed from Kensington and installed on the rooftop of Linuxcaffe (named after the Linux Operating system) on the corner of Harbord St. and Grace St. in downtown Toronto in June 2008.

WN used Free and open source software exclusively for its servers, Web site, and wireless routers. The servers ran Gentoo Linux, and the Linksys WRT54GL routers at each location ran OpenWrt, ChilliSpot, and OpenVPN. Wi-Fi mesh networking using OLSR was also part of WN's deployment, with several small mesh networks in use in Toronto. WN's servers were hosted by the Toronto Community Co-location Project in downtown Toronto from January, 2005 until May 2008. Colan Schwartz wrote the billing system, Ron Goulard installed antennas and configured equipment, and Jorge Torres-Solis wrote custom firmware for the routers.

Wireless Nomad was a Community Partner with the Canadian Research Alliance for Community Innovation and Networking (CRACIN) and the Community Wireless Infrastructure Research Project (CWIRP) through Prof. Andrew Clement and Matthew A. Wong (graduate student) with the University of Toronto Faculty of Information (formerly Faculty of Information Studies). In 2008, the co-op filed a submission to the CRTC in support of the Canadian Association of Internet Providers in the Bell throttling issue.
