= Amalgamated Dairies Limited =

Prince Edward Island dairy co-operative

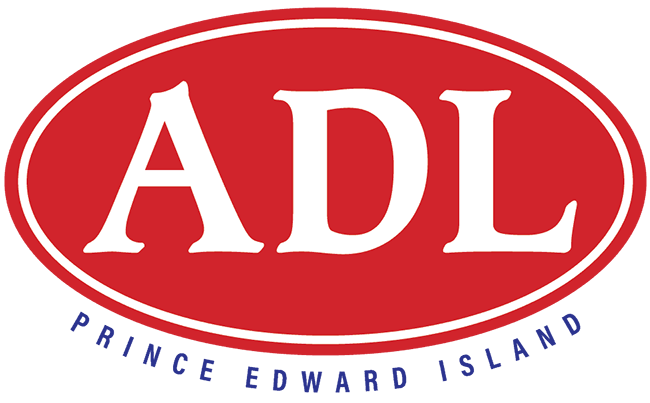
- Company type: Dairy co-operative
- Industry: Dairy
- Founded: 1953
- Headquarters: Summerside, Prince Edward Island, Canada
- Area served: Canada
- Products: Milk, cream, butter, cheese, evaporated milk, sweetened condensed milk
- Brands: ADL, Dairy Isle, Perfection
- Members: 160 dairy producers
- Number of employees: 300+
- Website: adl.ca

Amalgamated Dairies Limited (ADL) is a Prince Edward Island dairy processing co-operative founded in 1953. It is owned by roughly 160 dairy producers and operates multiple facilities across the province.

== History ==
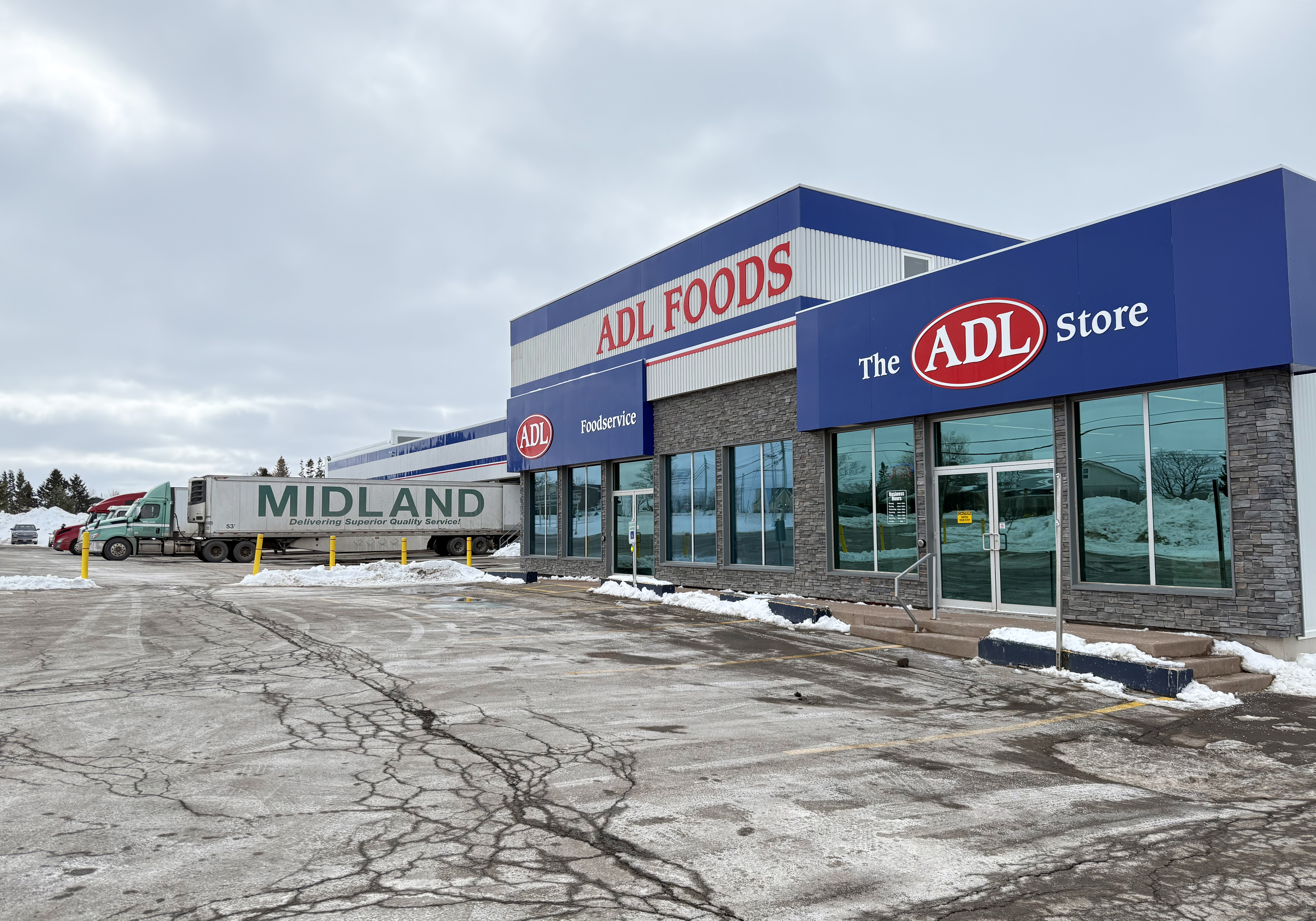
ADL's headquarters in Summerside

ADL's formation in 1953 consolidated several community dairies into a single Island-wide processor to centralize milk collection and processing. Over the decades it expanded beyond fluid milk and butter into cheddar and specialty cheeses, as well as shelf-stable evaporated and sweetened condensed milk.

In 2016 ADL introduced the Dairy Isle brand to sell outside Prince Edward Island, later distributed nationally by Walmart Canada. A local newspaper reported that Dairy Isle products won awards including first place at the British Empire Cheese Show.

A major expansion of the Summerside cheese plant was completed in 2018. A federal press release in 2025 announced up to $12 million in funding to further increase processing capacity at the plant.

A 2025 news report noted that ADL was expanding capacity while monitoring U.S. trade developments affecting dairy. Several media outlets also covered product changes, including long-time ADL ice-cream flavours being discontinued in P.E.I. store freezers.

== Production and distribution ==
ADL processes a majority of Prince Edward Island's raw milk, with cheese production centered at its Summerside plant and fluid milk handled at a facility in Charlottetown's West Royalty industrial area. Products include butter, cheddar, feta, havarti, ice-cream mix, evaporated milk and sweetened condensed milk.

== See also ==
- Agropur
- List of cooperatives
