= St-Albert Cheese Co-operative =

Cheese making co-operative

Coordinates: 45.25313°N 75.12160°W

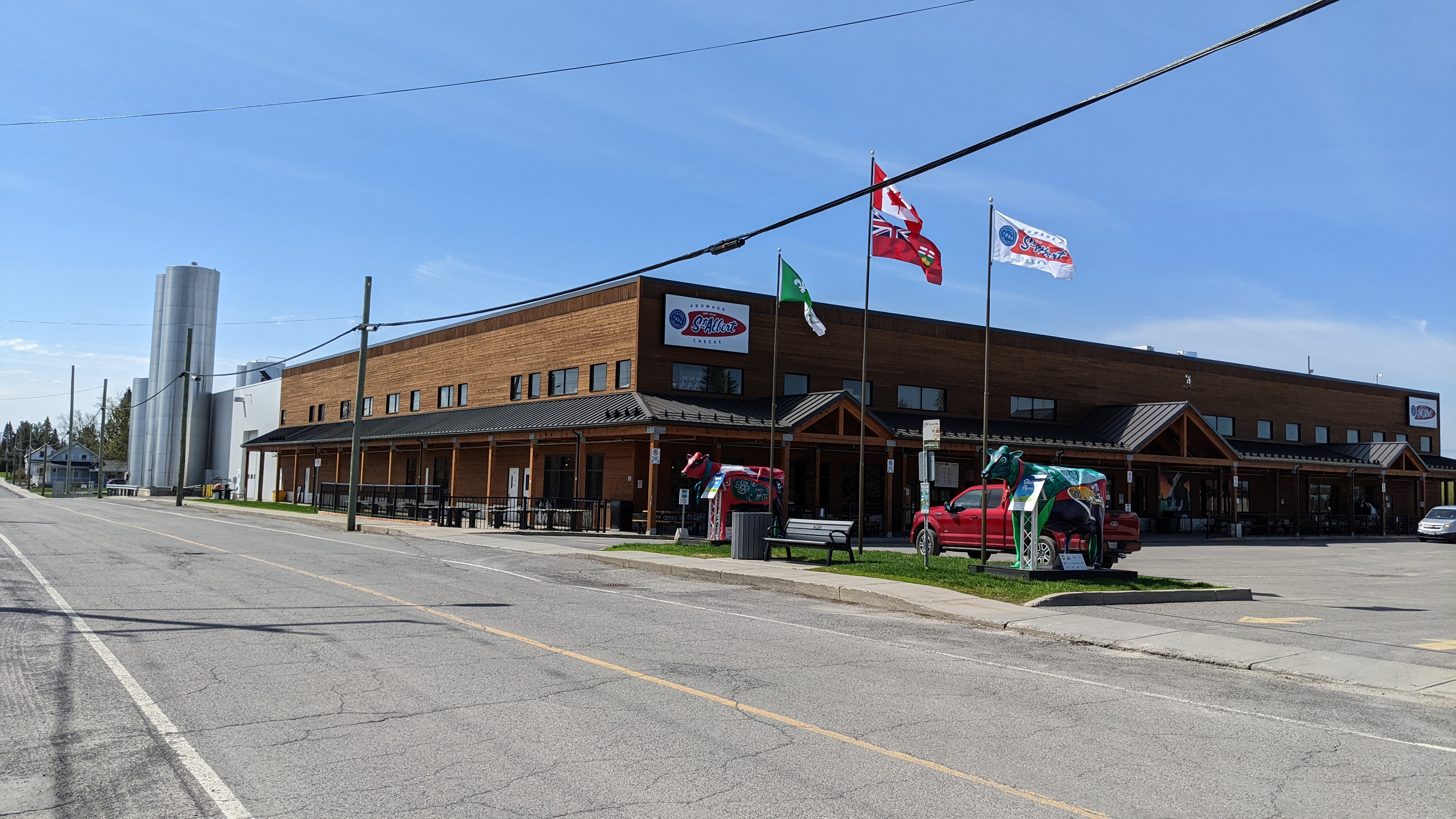
Co-op building

The St-Albert Cheese Co-operative (French: Fromagerie St-Albert) is a Franco-Ontarian co-operative that specialises in making cheese. One of the oldest co-operatives in Canada, it is known for its cheddar and its poutine curds and was named Grand Champion at the 2013 and 2014 British Empire Cheese Shows.

== History ==
In early January 1894, a group of Franco-Ontarian cheesemakers in St. Albert, Ontario gathered together to launch a cheesemaking co-operative, named "The St-Albert Co-Operative Cheese Manufacturing Association." Led by Louis Génier, the group included Joseph Forgues, Moïse Scheffer, Joseph Labelle, Antoine Quesnel, Joseph Pinsonneault, Godfroy Clément, Jean-Baptiste Ouimet, Cyril Richer, and Adrien Trudeau.

In 1931, the Co-op was sold to a private businessman. However, the private ownership did not last long, and in 1939, the Co-op's workers raised a sum of $8,500 to buy it back.

In 1995, Réjean Ouimet, the great-grandson of founder Jean-Baptiste Ouimet, was named general manager of the Co-op, a post he held for the following two decades.

In 2009, the Co-op brought the Fromagerie Mirabel in Saint-Jérôme, Quebec. Later that year, the Co-op announced an expansion of its facilities, funded in party by $1.4 million in development funds from the government of Ontario, that would theoretically allow it to double its production, depending on Canadian Dairy Commission quotas.

=== 2013 fire ===
On 3 February 2013, the Co-op was struck by a fire, resulting in widespread destruction of its facilities and tens of millions of property damage, including over $3 million worth of cheese and numerous historical archives of the Co-op. The mayor of The Nation, Ontario, the municipality that includes St-Albert, stated that the fire was "more than the loss of the building. It's a page of history that's been ripped out."

In the weeks following the fire, Ontario was struck by a shortage of cheese curds, with deals being made with several Québec fromageries to increase production to temporarily service the region. A small online black market popping up, with a bag of St-Albert cheese that usually cost $7 being resold on sites such as Kijiji for as much as $55.

A number of the Co-op's workers were temporarily transferred to jobs at other fromageries while reconstruction began, while other workers were tasked with helping the reconstruction.

In 2014, the Co-op was able to restart some production on site. In 2015, it fully opened its rebuilt facilities. The government of Ontario also provided some funds to help the Co-op rebuild.

In March 2015, the Co-op announced that it would sue a number of electric companies and regulators, including the Electrical Safety Authority and Eaton Corporation, alleging that electrical equipment that was badly manufactured and installed, and had been missed during safety inspections, had caused the fire.

By 2018, the Co-op's production levels had returned to the level from before the fire.

=== Post-fire ===
In 2019, the Co-op celebrated its 125th anniversary with several events being held in St-Albert. On 25 September 2019, Franco-Ontarian Day in Ontario, the 17th Monument to Ontario Francophonie was inaugurated next to the Co-op. It received a $1.5 million grant from the Dairy Processing Investment Fund.

In February 2021, during the COVID-19 pandemic in Canada, the Co-op was forced to temporarily close after three workers tested positive for the disease. After further testing by the Eastern Ontario Health Unit, the outbreak was contained, and the Co-op was able to re-open in March.

== See also ==
- List of cooperatives
