= Bill C-398: An Act to amend the Telecommunications Act (Internet neutrality) =

Proposed 2009 Canadian bill

Parliament of Canada
- Long title: An Act to amend the Telecommunications Act (Internet neutrality)
- Considered by: 40th Canadian Parliament

Legislative history
- Bill title: C-398
- Bill citation: Bill C-398, 40th Parliament, 2nd Session, 2009
- Introduced by: Charlie Angus
- Status: Not passed

Bill C-398: An Act to amend the Telecommunications Act (Internet neutrality) (French: Projet de Loi C-398: Loi modifiant la Loi sur les télécommunications (neutralité d'Internet) was tabled in the Parliament of Canada by Charlie Angus, the MP for Timmins—James Bay, on May 29, 2009, on the second session of the 40th Parliament.

Bill C-398 aimed to prohibit various forms of discrimination by telecommunications service providers. It would have provided that: "Network management practices that favour, degrade or prioritize any content, application or service transmitted over a broadband network based on its source, ownership, destination or type" would be specifically prohibited, subject to certain exceptions.

Telecommunications service providers would have been able to use reasonable management practices in order to alleviate extraordinary congestion, may prioritize emergency communications, and assure the security of computers and networks in a reasonable manner. ISPs, according to the proposed bill, would also be allowed to charge users on a usage-based basis as well as offer directly to users consumer protection services that may discriminate, provided notice was given to users as well as a possibility to opt-out.

The bill would also have prohibited telecommunications service providers to hamper foreign device attachment to their networks provided the device would neither damage nor degrade the network. Telecommunications service providers would also have been obligated to render available to users at all time information about the speed, limitations and management practices that were in effect.

== History ==
The bill was a re-submitted version of Bill C-552 which was introduced one day after 300 protesters came to Parliament in May 2008. The Net Neutrality movement in Canada had accelerated since telecom providers Bell Canada and Rogers were found to have throttled their users P2P traffic. Liberal MP David McGuinty had followed closely on the heels of Angus' first private member initiative with a private bill of his own, C-555.
