= Madison Community Cooperative =

Housing cooperative located in Madison, Wisconsin

Coordinates: 43°05′00.7″N 89°21′51.7″W

Madison Community Cooperative Logo

Madison Community Cooperative, or MCC, is a housing cooperative composed of 11 houses in Madison, Wisconsin with around 200 resident members.

MCC is a member of North American Students of Cooperation (NASCO) as well as the Northcountry Cooperative Development Fund (NCDF). The majority of the cooperative houses are located near the UW Madison campus.

== History ==
Inspired by a North American Students of Cooperation (NASCO) conference, on December 10, 1968, eight representatives of Madison co-ops incorporated the Madison Association of Student Cooperatives (MASC). In 1971, MASC changed its name to Madison Community Cooperative (MCC). Beginning in 1997, MCC tailored its articles, bylaws and mission "to improve the Madison community by providing low cost, not-for-profit cooperative housing for very low to moderate income people and to be inclusive of underrepresented and marginalized groups of the community."

The membership of MCC voted to sue the City of Madison for property tax exemption at a General Meeting on March 9, 1997. Property tax exemption in Wisconsin is available only to not-for-profit organizations that are benevolent. The City Attorney had denied exemption to MCC by arguing that MCC was not benevolent but primarily served students who, if poor, were voluntarily and temporarily poor.

Attorney David Sparer tried the case on behalf of MCC. MCC members testified in Dane County Circuit Court that non-students, including people of color, older people, parents and poor residents, were increasingly joining the MCC membership.

When authorizing the suit, the membership conditioned the lawsuit on any "budgetary savings MCC realizes from a successful resolution of our case will not be used to reduce house payments across the board by more than 3% in any fiscal year" and that "the line-item in the MCC Budget that allocates money to property taxes be changed from a fixed line to a variable one, to keep open the possibility of MCC maintaining some level of funding to city services."

After settling the case with the City of Madison, MCC surveys all the members income status and annually provides the City of Madison with the income ranges of its tenant-members. MCC continues to make annual payments in lieu of taxes (PILOT) in order to pay for necessary police and fire protection.

== Houses ==
- Ambrosia Cooperative House (formerly Assata, before that Martha's, before that Stone Manor Student Co-op)
- Audre Lorde Cooperative House (formerly Emma Goldman)
- Avalon Cooperative House (formerly Womyn's)
- Friends Cooperative House
- Hypatia Cooperative House (formerly Mulberry, before that Groves Women's Co-op)
- International Cooperative House
- Lothlórien Cooperative House
- Ofek Shalom Cooperative House
- Zoe Bayliss (a former UW-Madison Women's Co-Op, which is now in the location of the former Marsha P. Johnson Cooperative, which was previously known as Phoenix Cooperative House, and before that Le Chateau)
- Sofia Cooperative House (formerly Orton, before that the Goo Hut)
- Syntropy Cooperative House

== See also ==
- North American Students of Cooperation (NASCO)
- Northcountry Cooperative Development Fund (NCDF)
