= Eddie Thompson (businessman) =

Scottish businessman (1940–2008)

- Born: Edward Henry Thompson; 16 July 1940; Glasgow, Scotland
- Died: 15 October 2008 (aged 68); Dundee, Scotland, UK
- Occupations: Businessman, accountant
- Years active: 1991–2008
- Title: chairman of Dundee United F.C.
- Spouse(s): Cath Thompson (m. ?–2008, his death)
- Children: 2

Edward Henry Thompson OBE (16 July 1940 – 15 October 2008) was a Scottish businessman. A well-known figure in the Scottish retail industry, he founded the convenience store chain Morning, Noon and Night in 1991, which he later sold for £30 million in 2004. He was awarded the OBE for services to the Scottish grocery industry in 2005.

A long-time supporter of Dundee United F.C., Thompson bought the club in 2002 and remained chairman until his death in 2008.

== Business career ==
Born in Glasgow, where he attended Hyndland Secondary School, Thompson qualified as an accountant prior to working in managerial positions for Dundee-based Watson & Philip, owners of the VG chain of convenience stores. In 1991, he left them to become founder and chief executive of a similar chain called Morning, Noon & Night. He continued to run the company until selling it to Scotmid in 2004 for £30m.

He was awarded the OBE in June 2005, in recognition of his services to the Scottish grocery industry and his work as chairman of the Scottish Retail Consortium. As well as the SRC, he has also served on the board of the CBI Council for Scotland, the British Retail Consortium and the Scottish Grocers' Federation. He has also been a recipient of the Scottish Grocery Lifetime Achievement Award.

== In football ==
Thompson was initially a Motherwell fan, but changed his allegiances and became a supporter of Dundee United when he moved to the Dundee area. He had a lengthy association with the club, and instigated their first ever shirt sponsorship deal, with VG, in the 1980s. He was appointed the club's honorary business consultant but subsequently became estranged from the club's management after falling out with manager and chairman Jim McLean. Thompson spent many years trying to invest in the club, being constantly rebuffed until finally assuming control of Dundee United in September 2002 when he bought McLean's shareholding.

You can change your wife, your house, your car, but you can never change your team. Chairmen come and go, boards come and go, but the fans remain. They are the one true constant. I've just been a custodian of the Club.

— Eddie Thompson

After gaining control he invested large sums of money in the team, but initially with limited success. Thompson gained a reputation as a ruthless chairman, sacking five managers in little more than his first four years in charge. He continued to take charge of club affairs personally, despite having been diagnosed with prostate cancer in 2003. Thompson also served as a member of the Scottish Premier League management board.

The club's fortunes began to improve following the appointment of Craig Levein, who would become a personal friend of Thompson, as manager in October 2006. During the 2007–08 season, Dundee United reached the Scottish League Cup Final, by which time it had become public knowledge that the chairman was terminally ill. Many supporters wore T-shirts bearing a "One Eddie Thompson" slogan during the final against Rangers to pay tribute to his efforts on behalf of the club. Also during March 2008, it was announced that the East Stand at United's Tannadice Park stadium was to be renamed after Thompson, following suggestions by supporters.

During this period, Thompson reorganised the club to ensure continuity following his death. His son Stephen, already a director, was appointed as chief executive, taking over many of his father's duties. Craig Levein was also appointed to the board as director of football, in addition to his managerial role.

Thompson died of prostate cancer on 15 October 2008. His death was announced by Dundee United in a statement: "It is with great sadness that Dundee United announce the death of chairman Eddie Thompson, who died today after a long illness borne with great fortitude, much bravery and a dogged determination to carry out his responsibilities at Tannadice for as long as possible."

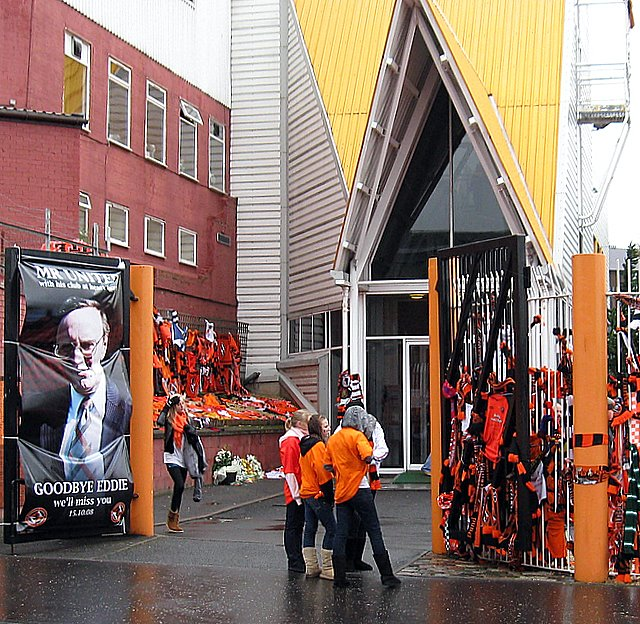
Tributes to Eddie Thompson at Tannadice Park after his death.

== Family ==
He is survived by his widow, daughter, son, and four grandchildren. His son-in-law was killed in a road accident on 12 October 2008. His role as Chairman of Dundee United Football Club was taken over by his son Stephen.
