= Digital Federal Credit Union =

Credit union based in Marlborough, Massachusetts

DCU – Digital Federal Credit Union
- Type: Credit union
- Industry: Financial services
- Founded: October 1979
- Headquarters: Marlborough, Massachusetts, United States
- Number of locations: 23 full-service branches 5,900+ Co-Op shared branches located in 50 states
- Key people: Jeff Hank, Chair, Board of Directors; Wayne Haubner, Vice Chair, Board of Directors; Shruti Miyashiro, President and Chief Executive Officer Board of Directors: Rajeev Agarwal, Baba Bedi, Jason Collier, Margo Fowler, Greg Gillas, Camille Glover, Todd Hauschildt, Paula Hunter, Dave Keenan, Kumar Kittuswamy, Phil Roush
- Products: Savings; Checking; Consumer loans; Mortgages; Credit cards; Vehicle Loans; Commercial Loans; Investments
- Website: www.dcu.org

Digital Federal Credit Union (DCU) is a credit union based in Marlborough, Massachusetts.

It has over 1,159,000 members and is the largest credit union headquartered in New England as measured by assets, managing over US $13.0 billion. DCU is regulated under the authority of the National Credit Union Administration (NCUA) of the U.S. federal government.

DCU has 19 full-service branches in Massachusetts and four full-service branches in New Hampshire, although it has members in all 50 U.S. states.

On January 1, 2026, DCU merged with First Technology Federal Credit Union. The new credit union retains DCU's charter while keeping First Tech's name. The merger was granted regulatory approval from the NCUA on September 30, 2025. The merger created the 6th largest Credit Union in the United States by assets, and coast-to-coast branch network.

== History ==
DCU was chartered in 1979 for employees of Digital Equipment Corporation following complaints to CEO Ken Olsen that employees had been having difficulty securing mortgages.

It was founded as a commercial banking institution to serve both individual consumers and businesses. Over the years, it has expanded its offerings to include a wide range of financial services, including checking and savings accounts, credit cards, student and personal loans, mortgages, vehicle financing, and commercial lending.

In 2025, DCU began offering a credit-builder loan, allowing members to improve their credit while building savings.
