= U.S. AgBank =

a U.S. AgBank, Farm Credit Bank based in Wichita, Kansas, was a financial institution, part of the Farm Credit System lending to Farm Credit Services organizations serving Arizona, California, Colorado, Hawaii, eastern Idaho, Kansas, Nevada, New Mexico, Oklahoma, Utah, and western Wyoming.

Like other Farm Credit Banks, U.S. AgBank generated funds from selling bonds backed by the federal government. It did not lend directly to borrowers, but to 29 local Agricultural Credit Associations.

In 2010, the company announced plans for a merger with CoBank. The merger was completed in 2012.
