= Coastal Federal Credit Union =

Financial cooperative in North Carolina, US

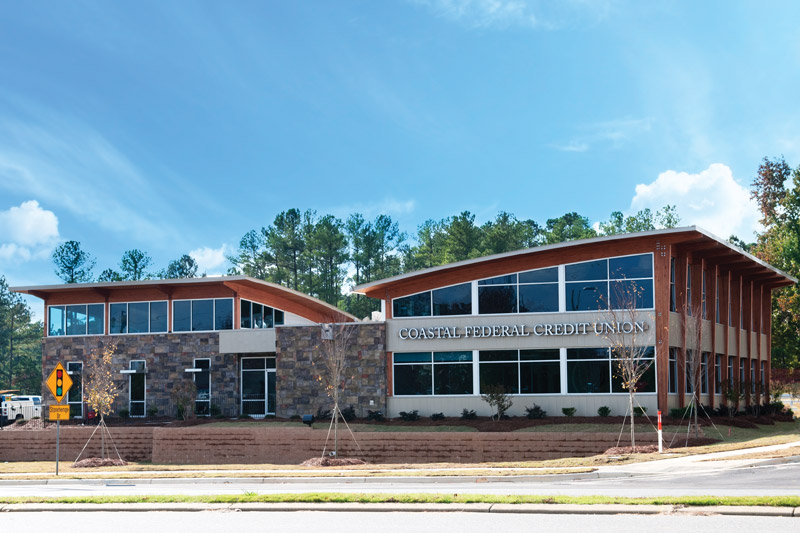
- Creedmoor Road Branch in Raleigh, North Carolina
- Type: Credit union
- Industry: Financial services
- Founded: 1967
- Headquarters: Raleigh, North Carolina, United States
- Key people: Tyler Grodi (President and CEO)
- Products: Savings; checking; consumer loans; mortgages; credit cards; investments; online banking; real estate brokerage; title insurance
- Total assets: $4.597 B USD (2022)
- Website: COASTAL24.com

Coastal Federal Credit Union is a not-for-profit, member-owned financial cooperative located in Raleigh, North Carolina. As of 2022, Coastal had $4.6 billion in assets and more than 323,000 members.

== History ==
Established in August 1967, Coastal was formed through the efforts of eight employees of International Business Machines Corporation (IBM) to meet the financial needs of the local IBM community in Raleigh. In 1991, the field of membership was expanded to include employees of other businesses throughout certain North Carolina areas. Today, Coastal serves employees of more than 1,700 businesses and associations.

Coastal was a pioneer in the area of video banking, and in 2010 became the first institution in the world to convert 100 percent of its teller operations to video tellers.

Coastal operates 23 branches in central North Carolina and serves members in all 50 states through a network of 5,000 branches, 80,000 ATMs, mobile banking featuring check deposit, and robust offering of online services.
