= Princeton Cooperative =

The Princeton Co-op
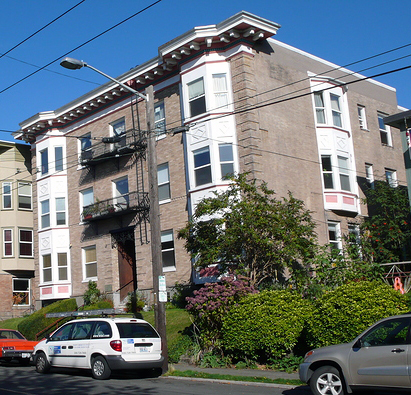
- Interactive map of the The Princeton Co-op area
- Former names: Ansonia Apartments

General information
- Status: Completed
- Type: Housing cooperative
- Location: 1726 15th Ave; Seattle, Washington, United States
- Coordinates: 47.617271°N 122.312364°W,
- Construction started: September 9, 1906
- Cost: $20,000
- Owner: The Princeton Cooperative Association Inc.

Technical details
- Material: Wood framing, Brick veneer
- Floor count: 3
- Lifts/elevators: 0

Design and construction
- Architect: Henderson Ryan
- Developer: C. E. Munro

Website
- https://www.princeton.coop

The Princeton Cooperative is a housing cooperative located on Capitol Hill, Seattle, Washington. It was built as the Ansonia apartment house in 1906 and was incorporated as a co-op in 1948. The building has 25 member-owned units and one unit owned by the corporation that is an amenity rental. There are three floors with eight units per floor. One unit is located in the basement as is communal storage and laundry facilities. The co-op is equipped with Wave G fiber internet service.

== Owner ==
The building is owned by a non-profit corporation of which the residents of the building are member owners. The co-op is run cooperatively by the members via the Board of Directors that meets monthly to manage the co-op's business.

== Membership ==
Any individual may become a member of the co-op after approval by a majority of the Board after being interviewed and submitted to a background check. The Board of Directors considers whether individuals are qualified and have a comparable community interest with current members of the co-op.

Cleaning duties and basic maintenance are performed by volunteers and service providers.

== Gallery ==
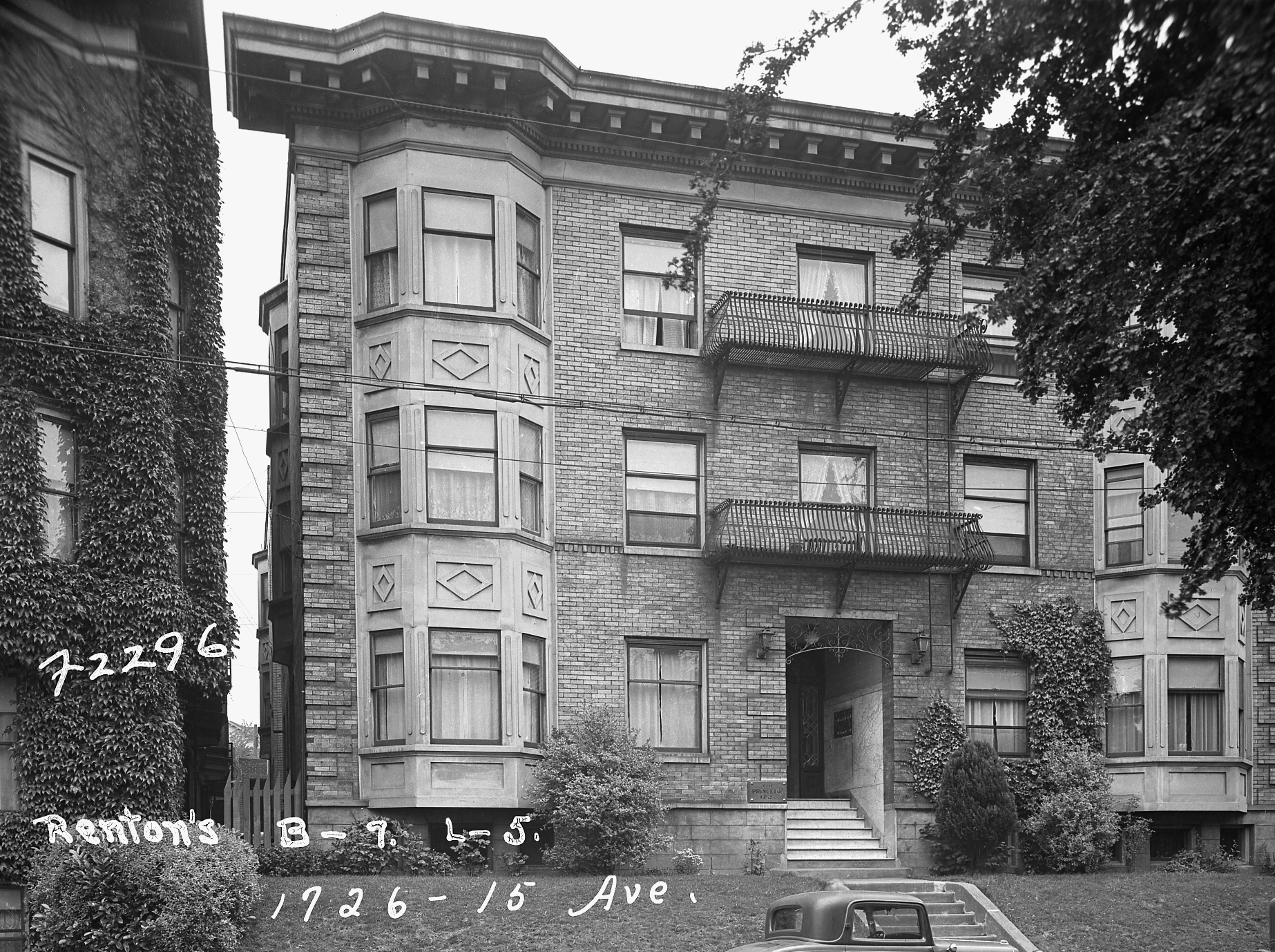
King County Assessor Property Record Card, c.1937

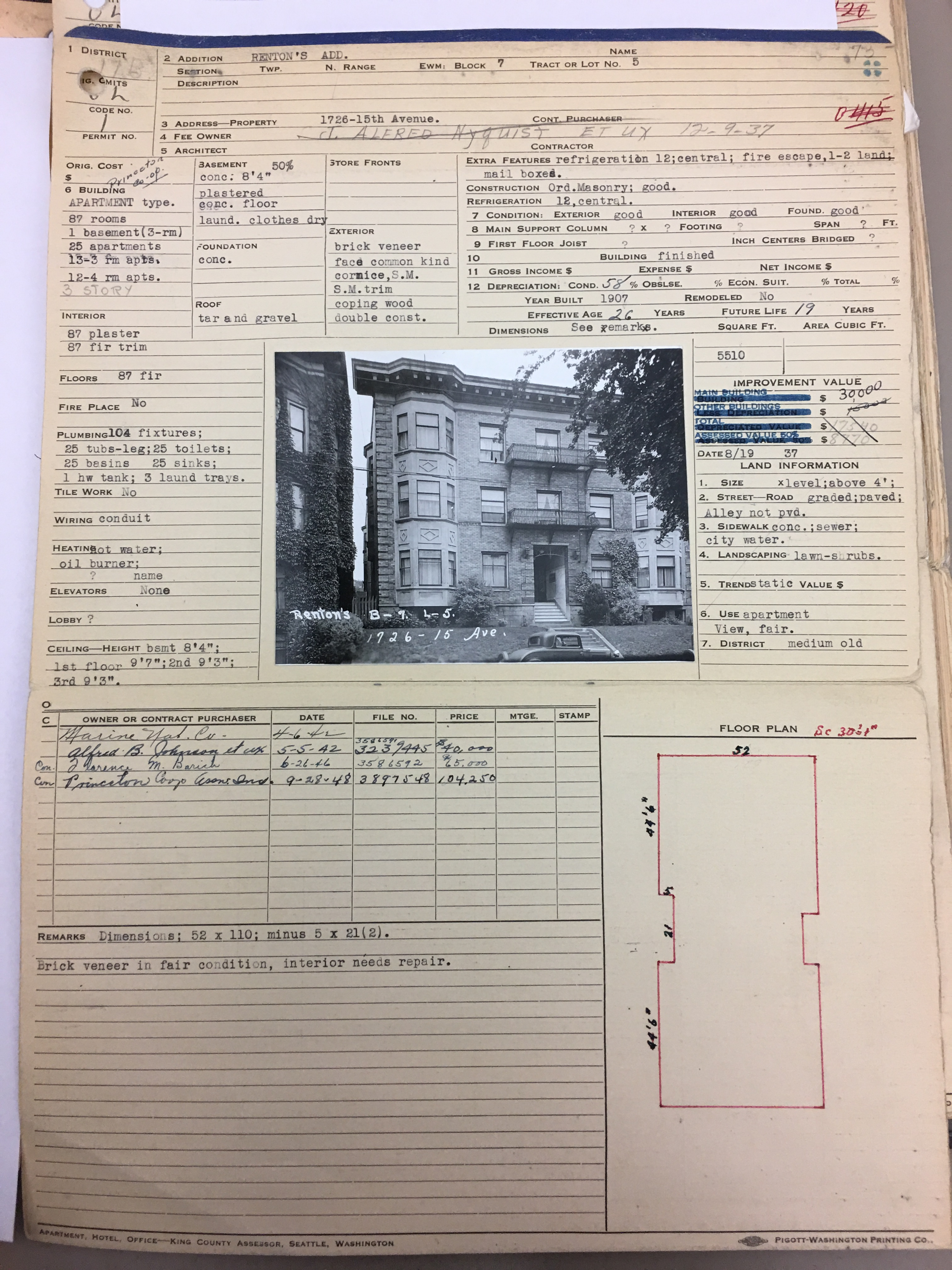
King County Assessor Property Record Card
