= Net neutrality in Canada =

Net neutrality in Canada is a debated issue, but not to the degree of partisanship in other nations, such as the United States, in part because of its federal regulatory structure and pre-existing supportive laws that were enacted decades before the debate arose. In Canada, Internet service providers (ISPs) generally provide Internet service in a neutral manner. Some notable incidents otherwise have included Bell Canada's throttling of certain protocols and Telus's censorship of a specific website critical of the company.

However, the telecommunications concept currently is explicitly enforced by Canada's federal telecommunications regulatory body, The Canadian Radio-television and Telecommunications Commission (CRTC), with the open support of the current federal government under Prime Minister Justin Trudeau.

== History ==
In Canada, under the Federal Telecommunications Act of 1993, internet providers are considered utilities which are subject to regulations which in spirit predate later debates about net neutrality that state that service providers can't give "undue or unreasonable preference," nor can they influence the content being transmitted over their networks. Furthermore, the CRTC, unlike the more directly political appointees of the American Federal Communications Commission (FCC), is a more arms-length regulatory body with more autonomous authority over telecommunications. For example, the CRTC's decisions rely more on a more judiciary process relying on evidence submitted during public consultations, rather than along party lines as the American FCC is prone to do.

In 2005, when Telus blocked access to labour union blogs during an employee strike, the question of net neutrality became more prominent.

In March 2006, the then Conservative government led by then Industry Minister Maxime Bernier updated the Telecommunications Policy Objectives and Regulation with new objectives to focus on three broad goals:

- Promoting affordable access to advanced telecommunications services in all regions of Canada, including urban, rural, and remote areas
- Enhancing the efficiency of Canadian telecommunications markets and the productivity of the Canadian economy
- Enhancing the social well-being of Canadians and the inclusiveness of Canadian society by meeting the needs of the disabled, enhancing public safety and security, protecting personal privacy and limiting public nuisance through telecommunications networks.

On February 7, 2007, The Canadian Press obtain documents where the Conservative government is reluctant to implement Net neutrality legislation. However, Bernier and his advisers, despite acknowledging the arguments made by telecom companies, stated that "it would be premature at this time to draw any conclusions." The documents point to statements like public policy must consider consumer protection and choice, but it should also "enable market forces to continue to shape the evolution of the Internet infrastructure, investment and innovation to the greatest extent feasible.''

On May 28, 2008, the federal New Democratic Party (NDP) introduced a private member's bill, C-552, to the House of Commons that would explicitly entrench the principle of "net neutrality" and enact rules to keep the Internet free from interference by service providers. This bill died on the order paper at 1st reading on September 7, 2008, when Prime Minister Stephen Harper asked the Governor General for the dissolution of the 39th Session of Parliament.

On June 8, 2008, a private member's bill, C-555, entitled "The Telecommunications Clarity and Fairness Act" was introduced by Liberal MP David McGuinty (Ottawa–South) that sought to undertake, among other things, "an assessment of network management practices that favour, degrade or prioritize any packet transmitted over a broadband network based on source, ownership or destination". Like the NDP bill, this proposed legislation fell after the 39th Parliament was dissolved by the Governor General.

In November 2008, the Canadian Radio-television and Telecommunications Commission (CRTC) scheduled a review of the Internet traffic management of ISPs and is still in the review process. The CRTC took comments from the public until Monday, February 23, 2009. In May 2009 An Act to amend the Telecommunications Act (Internet neutrality) was introduced during the second session of the 40th Parliament to ensure net neutrality. This act (Bill C-398) did not become law.

On January 25, 2011, the CRTC ruled that usage-based billing could now be introduced. Prime Minister Harper signalled that the government may be looking into such a ruling: "We're very concerned about CRTC's decision on usage-based billing and its impact on consumers. I've asked for a review of the decision". Some have suggested that this adversely affects net neutrality, since it discriminates against media that is larger in size, such as audio and video. The new ruling significantly throttles the availability of access by small business owners as they would have to pay for services.

In April 2017, the CRTC took a series of decisions to support net neutrality but also allow ISP's to offer differential pricing to customers, but only in the areas of speed rates, monthly data usage etc. but not based on content.

On November 22, 2017, in an interview with Vice Motherboard, Canadian Prime Minister Justin Trudeau expressed concern when the FCC in the United States proposed decreasing regulations concerning net neutrality. He stated that "Net neutrality is something that is essential for small businesses, for consumers, and it is essential to keep the freedom associated with the internet alive."

On December 14, 2017, Navdeep Bains, Minister of Innovation, Science and Economic Development concurred with that policy stating, "We believe that an open and accessible Internet is vital to the free flow of content and information, which, in turn, is vital to our democracy. Freedom, equality, diversity and openness are important values for our government, and we firmly intend to uphold these values."

== Cases of net neutrality violation ==
=== Telus vs. Telecommunications Workers Union ===
In July 2005, while its union workers were locked out, Telus blocked its subscribers access to Voices for Change, which was a community website run by and for Telecommunications Workers Union members. Telus claimed the site suggested striking workers jam Telus phone lines and that it posted pictures of employees crossing the union picket lines. A Telus spokesperson said advocating jamming lines hurt the company, and access to those pictures threatened the privacy and safety of employees.

Telus said in a news release that it had reached an agreement with the operator of Voices for Change to allow re-enabled access to the website. The agreement included the removal of all content, including photographs, posted with the intent of intimidation.

=== Bell Canada traffic shaping ===
On April 3, 2008, the Canadian Association of Internet Providers requested that the CRTC require Bell Canada to immediately cease its traffic shaping and Internet traffic throttling. On November 20, 2008, the CRTC ruled that Bell Canada's traffic shaping was not discriminatory because it was applied to both wholesale and retail customers. The CRTC also called for public hearings to ensure that network management practices are administered fairly in the future.

=== Bell Mobile TV undue and unreasonable preference ===
On November 20, 2013, graduate student Benjamin Klass filed a Part 1 application to the CRTC claiming that Bell Mobility was "giving itself an unfair advantage by applying a separate data cap to its own new media". The CRTC ruled in favour of Klass' claims on January 29, 2015, ordering both Bell Mobility and Videotron to stop giving themselves "undue and unreasonable preference". Bell appealed the decision to the Federal Court of Appeal but the court dismissed the appeal in 2016

A 2019 Canadian documentary short entitled Dude, Where's my TV? presents Ben v. Bell, chronicles Klass' David and Goliath net neutrality battle with Bell.

=== Xplornet throttling complaints ===
In 2014, Xplornet faced 12 complaints over the use of throttling technologies. However, the CRTC decided not to impose penalties due to the fact that Xplornet had disclosed its policies before pledging to fix the problem.

=== Videotron's unlimited music service ===
In April 2017, the CRTC announced a ruling that required all data to be counted against a user's data cap, regardless of its source. The decision was made necessary by the introduction by Videotron of a cellular data plan that didn't count against the user's data cap any use of a "music over streaming" service in a restricted list of services (like Apple Music, Spotify and others). The rationale behind the decision was that the plan would give an unfair advantage to the services allowed on the list and would disadvantage small services that would want to enter the marketplace. The chairman of the CRTC, Jean-Pierre Blais, said at the time that "the aim [of] the decision was to encourage Internet service providers to compete on price, speed and network quality instead of acting as a gatekeeper."

== Opinion on legislation ==
In 2007, Bell Canada spokeswoman Jacqueline Michelis in an e-mail to The Canadian Press argued that introducing net neutrality legislation was not necessary by stating "Our position on network diversity/neutrality is that it should be determined by market forces, not regulation." On June 18, 2009, the Conservative Party of Canada was non-committal on the issue, arguing that free market competition is preferable to regulation.

TekSavvy, Velcom, Acanac Inc. argue that throttling by Bell Canada at the ISP level makes it difficult to differentiate their services against Bell Canada, concerning issues about deep packet inspection (DPI) and security, and the quality of service. According to TekSavvy, Bell Canada's congestion report to the CRTC shows that the "data suggests no congestion problems for at least 95 percent of the network in Ontario and Quebec.” Wholesale ISPs do not throttle bandwidth, but since wholesalers do not have a full network infrastructure, they rely on Bell Canada's network for the last stretch of cabling to customers. When Bell Canada receives packets on the network, it may be throttled, slowing down the connection between the wholesale ISP and the customer. TekSavvy and Velcom support MLPPP which circumvents Bell Canada's throttling.

Yahoo! and Microsoft argue that net neutrality law is necessary because without such a law, ISPs will destroy the free and open nature of the Internet and also create a tiered, dollar-driven net that favours the wealthiest corporations over everyone else.

Rogers Communications Inc. supports Canada net neutrality framework.

Michael Geist wrote about net neutrality in the Toronto Star. When he had an interview with CARTT.CA, he said that "from a policy and law perspective, we ought to be thinking about what kind of rules the government might consider to help facilitate some of that." Geist has used the Xplornet throttling complaints to indicate how Canada's current net neutrality framework does not uphold its principles. However, Ken Engelhart writing about net neutrality in the Financial Post argues that Canada's net neutrality framework can lead to over-regulation which can limit consumer choice.

An op-ed published in the Morning Consult by a couple of staff members—former policy advisers to then-Industry minister Maxime Bernier—argues in favour of net neutrality principles. However they favour a more "light touch regulatory regime that that can adapt to new business models and technological change" instead of "strict preventive rules" when enforcing it. In addition, both of them feel like both sides are misinterpreting the debate about net neutrality while Marcel Boyer argued in a 2009 article that net neutrality should be handled by anti-trust enforcement agencies such as the Canadian Competition Bureau instead of the CRTC.
