= Brighton Energy Co-operative =

Brighton Energy Limited
- Company type: Community Benefit Society
- Industry: Renewable Energy
- Founded: 15 November 2010
- Headquarters: Brighton, England
- Key people: Will Cottrell (Chair); Damian Tow (Secretary)
- Revenue: £408,464 (2022)
- Total assets: £3,174,191 (2022)
- Total equity: £3,017,386 (2022)
- Members: 604 (2022)
- Number of employees: 3 (2022)
- Website: brightonenergy.org.uk

Brighton Energy Co-operative (BEC) is community co-operative based in Brighton, England that exists to promote, build and run renewable energy projects in its locality. These include mainly the provision of solar photovoltaic systems onto school, community, municipal and industrial sites, plus also electric vehicle charging points and environmental education programmes in nearby schools.

.

Since its formation in 2010 the co-operative has raised over £3m in small scale investments from its 600+ members through community share and bond issues to fund the installation of the systems.

Recently BEC has introduced and administered a grant programme for participating local SMEs to install solar PV schemes onto their business premises.

The solar arrays produce low-carbon electricity which attracts Feed in Tariff payments, and creates income by exporting some of the power to the National Grid, with some being sold directly to the sites hosting the equipment.
