= Scary Cow Productions =

Film production cooperative

Scary Cow (Scary Cow, the indie film co-op) was a community-based independent film production cooperative in San Francisco.

== Introduction ==
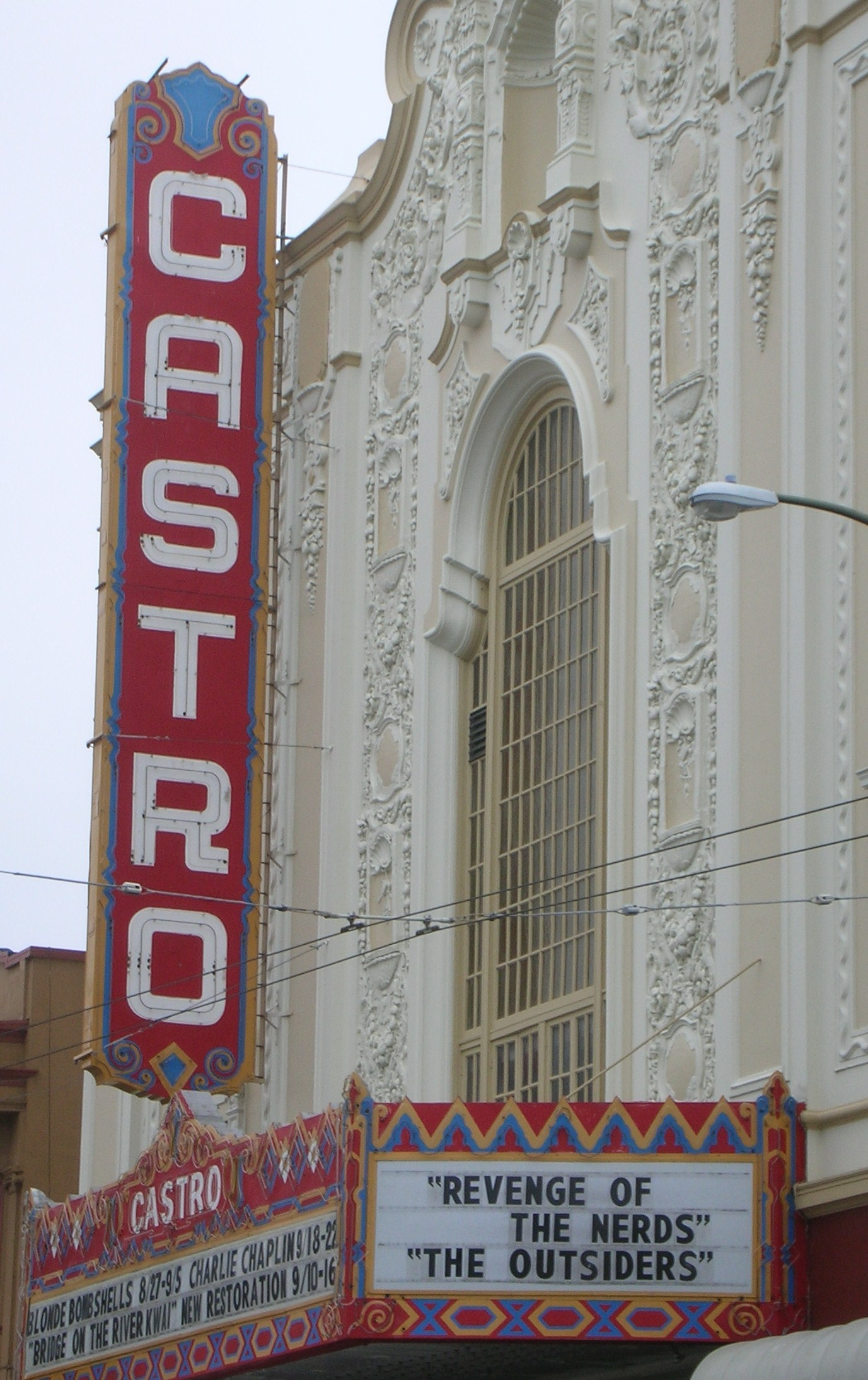
Castro Theater

Scary Cow was an indie film co-operative based in San Francisco, California. Focused on teaching adults how to make films, it used its website and in-person meetings to help filmmakers meet each other, pooling talent, assets, and financing, and putting together a crew to create short films within a four-month time period.

Every four months, Scary Cow held a screening, usually at the Castro Theater in San Francisco. The audience members were provided ballots to vote for their favorite films. Those ballots were tabulated and budgets were provided to the teams with the most votes. This encouraged the teams with the best films to continue working together and creating additional films in the future.

== History ==
Founded in February 2006 by Jager McConnel, Scary Cow has created over 200 films since inception.

== Closing ==
Scary Cow Productions was shut down on December 23, 2020.
