= Black Star Co-op =

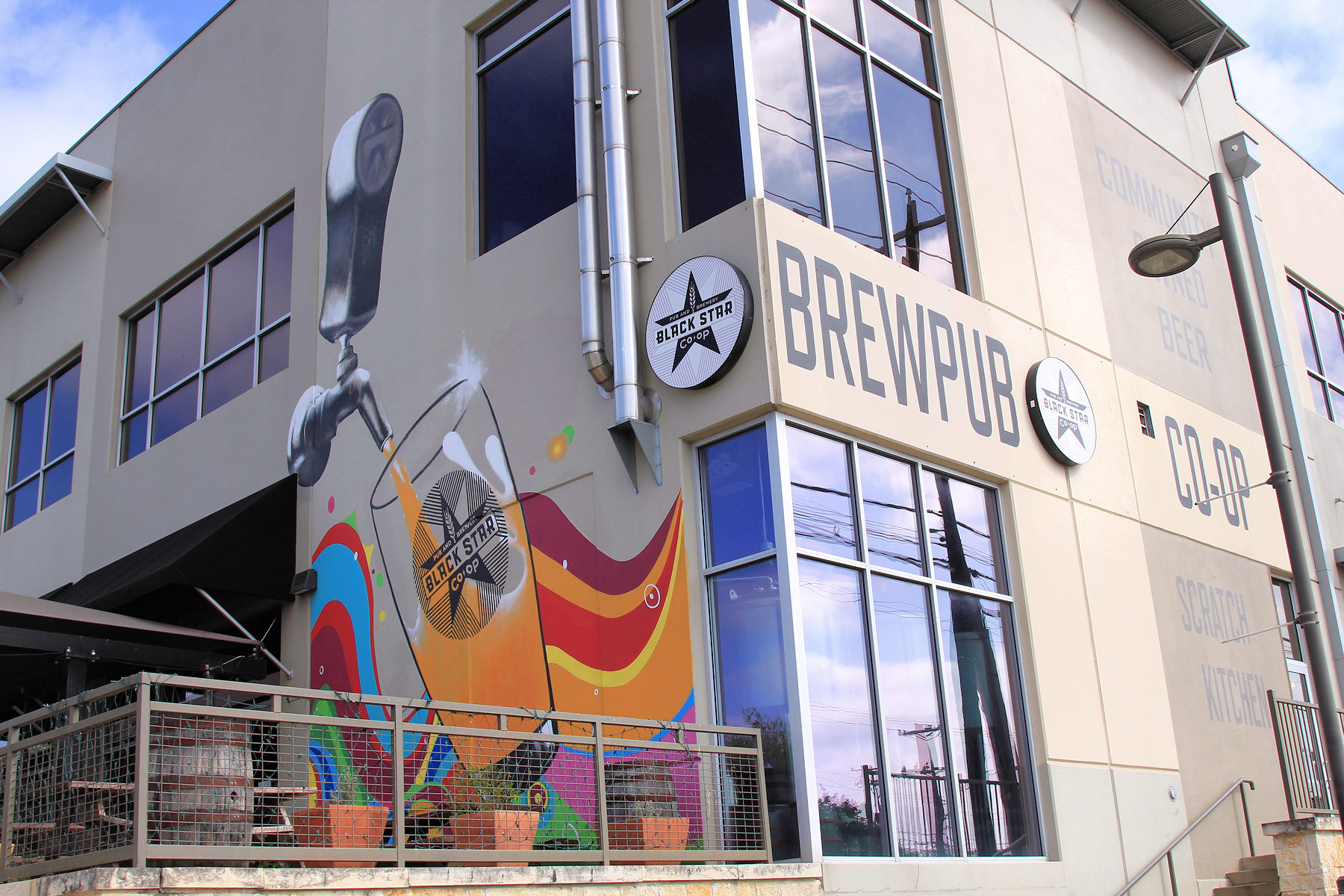
- Black Star Co-op taproom
- Company type: Consumer cooperative
- Founded: 2006
- Headquarters: Austin, Texas, United States
- Products: Brewpub and restaurant
- Members: 2,800
- Website: blackstar.coop

Black Star Co-op was a community-owned brewpub co-op in Austin, Texas. It was the first brewpub to operate under the Cooperative Principles. It opened its doors in 2010 and in 2021 it had over 3,000 members. It supported an on-site brewery as well as a restaurant and beer bar in Austin. Black Star Co-op permanently closed down on January 12, 2025.

== History ==
The co-op first met in January 2006 with sixteen people in attendance. By 2010, the growing organization raised more than $325,000 and found a location to begin operations. Black Star brews two groups of beers, the "rational" and "irrational". Rational beers are types beer drinkers may be familiar with and made with mostly traditional ingredients. Irrational beers are experimental and innovative with flavors not everyone may find palatable.
