= First Tech Federal Credit Union =

Credit union in Oregon, US

First Technology Federal Credit Union
- Type: Credit union
- Industry: Tech industry; Oregon State Employees; and other regional sponsor companies
- Founded: January 14, 1952
- Headquarters: Hillsboro, Oregon, United States
- Number of locations: 54 branches (2025)
- Key people: Shruti Miyashiro (President & CEO); Jeff Hank (Chair, Board of Directors)
- Services: Checking accounts, savings accounts, mortgages, loans, credit cards, home equity lines of credit, investment services, insurance services, tax services
- Net income: ▲US$31,691,000 (2025); US$28,796,000 (2024)
- Total assets: ▼US$16,446,786,000 (2025); US$17,373,579,000 (2024)
- Total equity: ▼US$16,446,786,000 (2025); US$17,373,579,000 (2024)
- Members: 2,000,000 (2025)
- Number of employees: 3,000 (2025)
- Website: firsttechfed.com

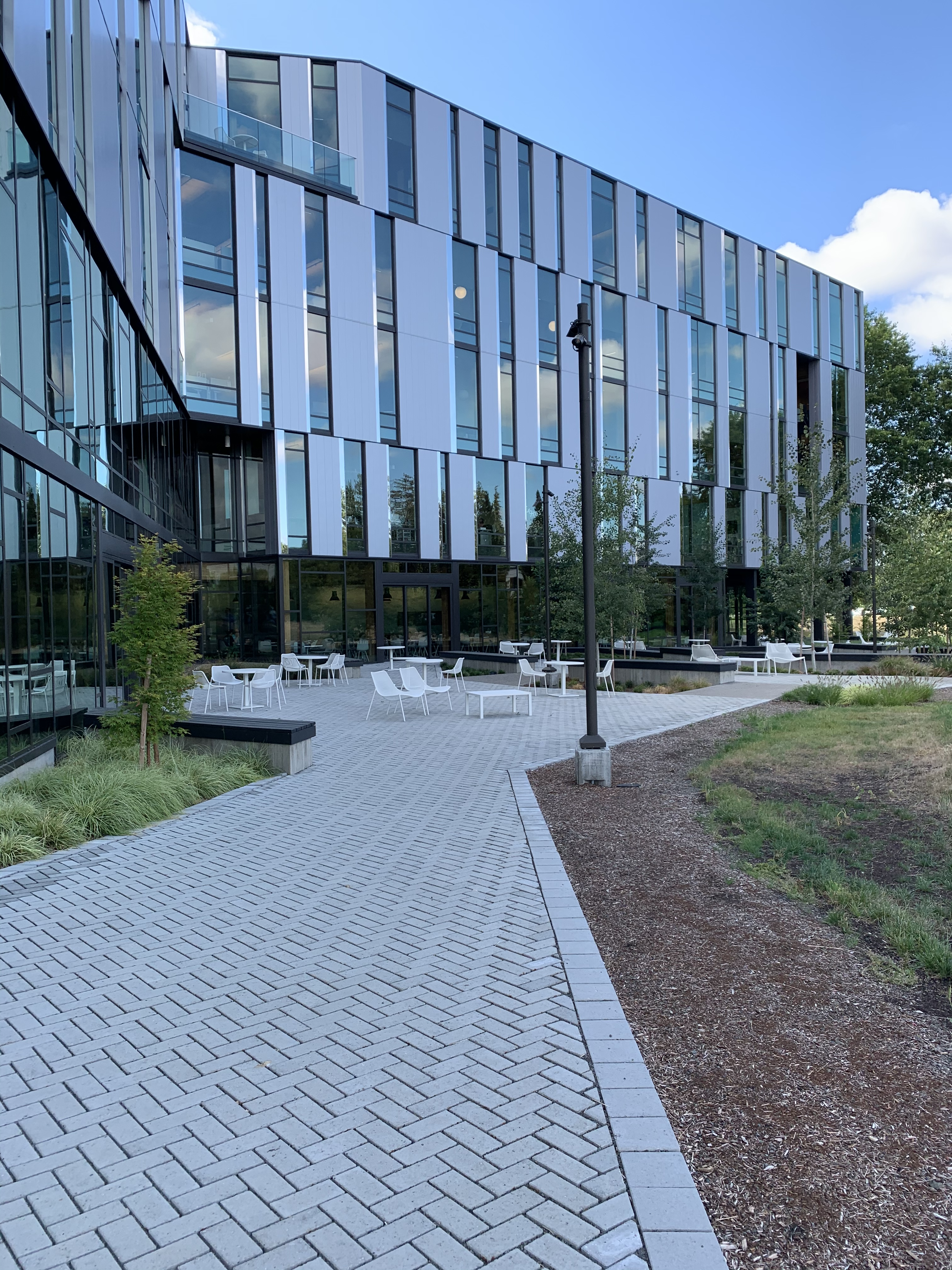
Front entrance to corporate office

First Technology Federal Credit Union (or First Tech) is a federally chartered credit union in the United States, headquartered in Hillsboro, Oregon. It is regulated under the authority of the National Credit Union Administration (NCUA). First Tech has over 700,000 members, and over 17 billion dollars in assets with 36 branches located mostly in high technology business centers of California, Colorado, Oregon, Washington and four other states. It was the first financial institution to offer telephone interactive voice response access and online banking.

== History ==
The credit union was founded as Tektronix Federal Credit Union, formed by seven Tektronix employees on January 14, 1952. In 1961, the name was changed to Tektronix Employees Federal Credit Union to reflect the credit union's membership. From very early on, technical innovation was emphasized and reflected in First Tech's motto of "Think Forward". As early as 1976, the credit union began using computers for online data processing. By 1979, Tektronix Employees Federal Credit Union had begun the use of ATMs. In 1985, the credit union unveiled "Call 24", which allowed members to check balances and transfer funds by phone.

In 1986, the name was changed to First Technology Credit Union and the membership was opened to include employees in technology industries of the Pacific Northwest. In 1992, Microsoft became involved. The 1995 launch of the company's website paved the way for the credit union to become the second financial institution in the world to perform secure internet transactions. In 1997, the name was shortened to First Tech Credit Union. First Tech began offering mobile banking in 2000, account aggregation in 2001, and biometric two-factor authentication in 2007. With over 156,000 members, and over 1.8 billion dollars in assets in 2007, First Tech was one of the largest state chartered credit unions in the Pacific Northwest.

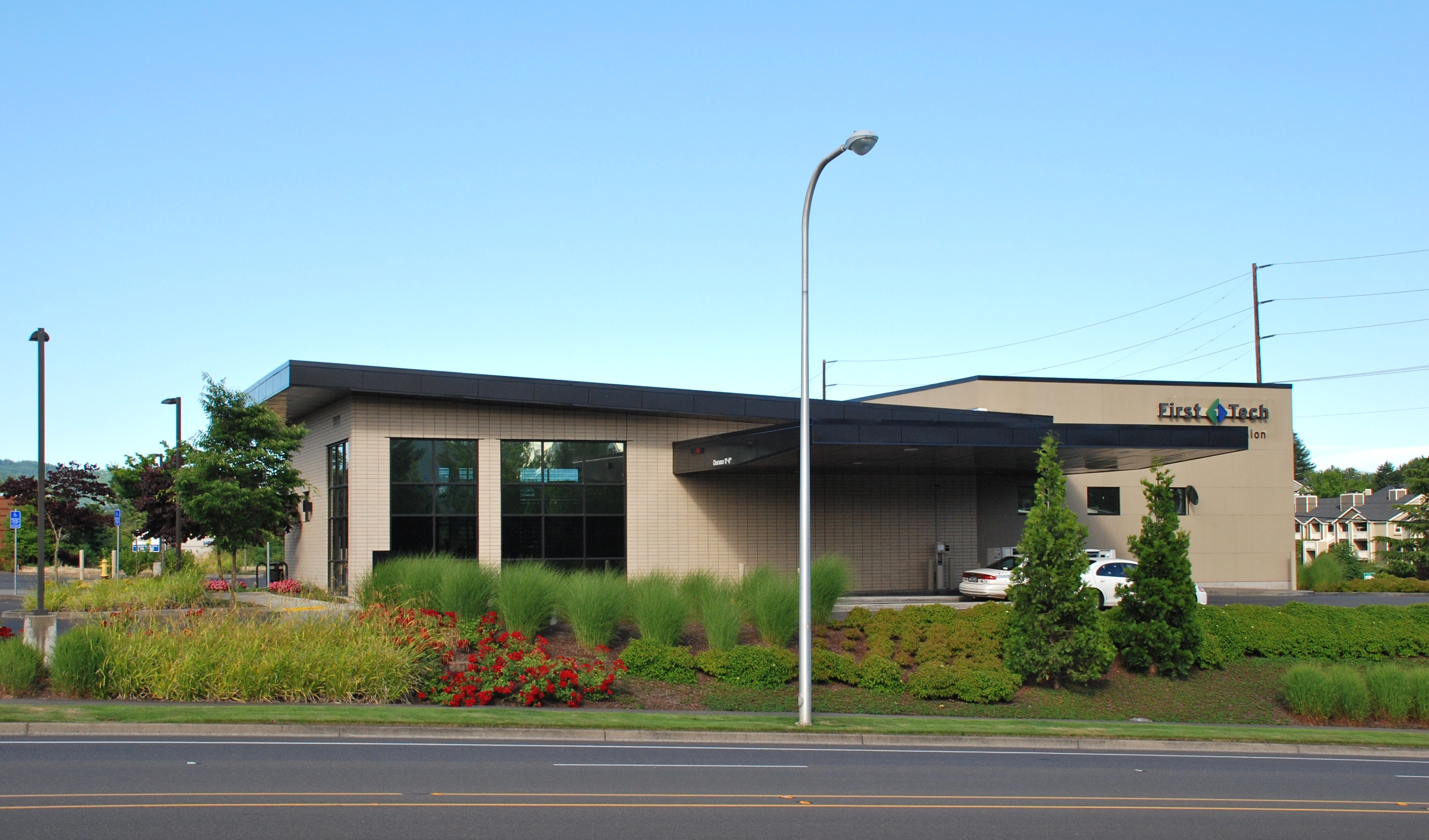
A branch in the Tanasbourne area

In March 2010, the company announced it would merge with California-based Addison Avenue Federal Credit Union, which was originally known as the Hewlett-Packard Credit Union and grew to also serve the employees of Agilent Technologies, CH2M Hill, and various other technology-based companies. The deal was approved by the government and credit union members, and became effective on January 1, 2011, with the new entity named First Tech Federal Credit Union.

The company relocated to a new corporate office in Hillsboro, Oregon, in 2018. The building is LEED Gold certified and is made almost entirely of cross-laminated timber (CLT). At the time of construction it was one of the largest CLT buildings in the world.

In September 2024, First Tech announced its intention to combine with Digital Federal Credit Union in a merger of equals. The new credit union would retain DCU's charter while keeping First Tech's name. Members of the First Tech Division voted in favor of the merger in December 2025. On January 1st, 2026, First Tech and Digital Federal Credit Union officially merged, with DCU President and CEO Shruti Mayashiro becoming CEO of the combined credit union.

== Online banking conversion ==
First Tech announced, in 2014, their decision to replace existing desktop and mobile banking platform while also converting members to a new bill payments provider.

In October 2015, the Credit Union implemented initial changes to their online and ebilling system and began converting members. The transition incrementally converts groups of members to the new platform over an extended period to ensure minimal disruption. CEO Greg Mitchell addresses members' challenges in an email to the Credit Union's members on 3/8/2016.

== Products ==
Besides standard banking services, First Tech also offers investment, insurance, and tax services to its members, including free bill payment service, an account aggregation service, and online access to check images. The union's designated ABA routing transit number is 321180379.
