= Lighthouse Cooperative =

- Company type: Cooperative
- Industry: Retail, Wholesale distribution
- Founded: July 7, 1998
- Headquarters: Tuguegarao, Philippines
- Area served: Cagayan, Isabela, Kalinga, Apayao, Metro Manila
- Key people: Rosauro G. Resuello, Arturo B. Tabbu, Christian D. Sales
- Products: Furniture Sales, Processed Food Products, Computer Sales & Services, School & Office Supplies Sales
- Members: 800+ (September 2013)
- Number of employees: 60+
- Website: http://www.lighthouse-cooperative.com

Lighthouse Cooperative is an associational cooperative established in Tuguegarao City, Cagayan, Philippines on July 7, 1998 by founder Rosauro "Pastor Ross" G. Resuello, together with Arturo B. Tabbu, Christian D. Sales, Andy L. Catulin, Serafin Umoquit, and 10 more cooperators. The members of the cooperative are also church members of the Victory Christian Fellowship of Tuguegarao.

== History ==
In 1998, the cooperative started as a food catering service provider during meetings and occasions for fellow members. Few years later, the cooperative expanded its services to computer sales as the demand for personal computers have risen in Tuguegarao. As years go by, Furniture and School and Office Supplies were also catered by this cooperative.

In 2004, Carne Ybanag was its new business venture producing local Tuguegarao sausages, other processed meat products, and buffalo crackers. In 2011, Carne Ybanag became Ybanag Food Products because of its production of milk candies, peanut brittles, cassava and rice crackers, and many other new processed foods.

Currently, the Cooperative maintains four departments selling furniture, school and office supplies, computer sales and repair, and the Ybanag Food Products.

== Notable Registered Brands and Food Products ==
The Chicha-rabao is one of the brands developed by the cooperative. It is deep-fried and popped buffalo/carabao skin added with flavors. It is a variant of the chicharon, which is a popular delicacy among Filipinos and Spanish-influenced nations. Chicha-rabao is currently one of the popular pasalubongs from Tuguegarao City.

Miss Kara is also a brand developed by the cooperative to help market the carabao milk candy industry of the city. Miss Kara candies are creamy truffles made from processed carabao milk, commonly known as pastillas to Filipinos.

Chicha-rica is a seasonal product of the cooperative which are crackers made from rice and cassava.

== Officers ==
The following are the current officers of the cooperative:

- Christian Sales, Chairman of the Board of Directors
- Jude Lingan, Vice-Chairman of the Board of Directors
- Joe Poblete, Director
- Andy L. Catulin, Director
- Serafin "Louie" C. Umoquit, Director
- Erna C. Balubal, Cooperative Treasurer
- Buddy de Jesus, Cooperative Secretary

== Membership ==
The cooperative has two types of memberships. Regular members are members who are entitled to vote and are holders of commons shares. At the other hand, associate members hold preferred shares but are not entitled to vote. There are 144 regular members of this cooperative and 621 associate members. The membership of the cooperative continually grows at an average of 5 new members per month. According to the Cooperative's By-Laws, Regular Members are also members of the Victory Christian Fellowship of Tuguegarao and have met the requirements of regular membership; on the other hand, all others who have applied and have been accepted shall only be considered for Associate Membership if requirements are not met.

== Awards and citations ==
- Presidential Awardee for Outstanding MSME (Medium Category) in 2009
- Presidential Awardee for Outstanding Agri Entrepreneur, Gawad Saka Awards 2011-2012
- Outstanding Agri Entrepreneur, Gawad Saka Awards (Regional Level) for 2009, 2010, and 2012.
- Matagumpay Award, National Trade Fair 2009
- 2008 National Awardee, PHILSMED
- 2008 Plaque of Recognition, Department of Science and Technology
