= Pioneer Telephone Cooperative (Oregon) =

Pioneer Telephone Cooperative is a cooperatively owned telecommunications business that provides telephone service in a 1,330-square-mile (3,400 km^{2}) region of western Oregon, including parts of four counties. The company has offices in Waldport and Philomath.
