= Heart of England Co-operative Society =

Independent consumer co-operative in the United Kingdom

Heart of England Co-operative Society Limited
- Type: Consumer Co-operative
- Industry: Retail (Wholesale)
- Founded: 1832
- Headquarters: Whittle House, Foleshill Enterprise Park, Courtaulds Way, Coventry, CV6 5NX
- Key people: Clive Miles, President Steve Browne, Chief Executive
- Products: Grocer, Funeral Director
- Revenue: ▲£74.2m (18/19)
- Operating income: ▼£2.9m (18/19)
- Number of employees: ▼716 (18/19)
- Website: heartofengland.coop

Heart of England Co-operative Society Limited is an independent consumer co-operative in the United Kingdom. Based in Coventry, the Society trades in the English counties of West Midlands, Warwickshire, Leicestershire and Northamptonshire.

Registered under the Co-operative and Community Benefit Societies Act 2014, the Society is a member of Co-operatives UK (formerly the Co-operative Union), the Co-operative Group (formerly Co-operative Wholesale Society) and its national buying scheme, the Federal Retail Trading Services.

For the financial year ending 19 January 2019, turnover (excluding VAT) was £74.2m (£71.7m 2017/18) and operating profit was £2.9m (£5.5m 2017/18). The Society had no external bank borrowings and a £4.3m pension deficit (£8.4m 2017/18). The Society declared a £342k staff dividend (£376k 2017/18) and did not declare a member dividend or dividend bonus during the year. Heart of England Co-op had 137,500 active members in 2018.

Each Heart of England Board Director is subject to re-election every three years by the full membership. The Co-operatives UK 'Code of Best Practice' also recommends a term-limit of six years for the Chair, but the current Board of the Society have waived this, as they 'believe that the individual elected annually (by Board Directors) should be judged on merit and should not be restricted to a pre-set maximum term'.

== History ==
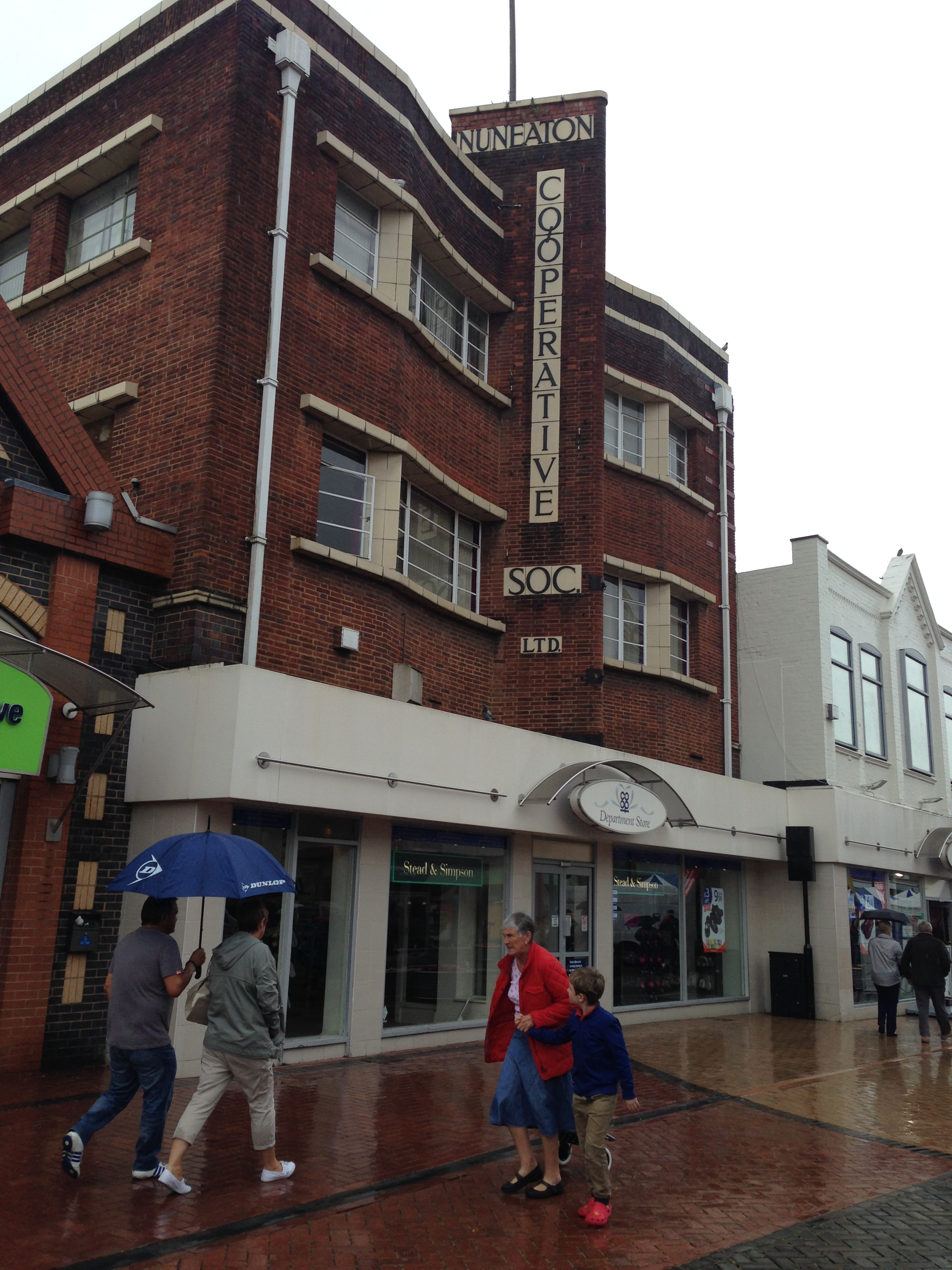
Heart of England Co-operative Society department store, originally built by the Nuneaton Co-operative Society.

The Heart of England Co-operative Society originates from the Lockhurst Lane Industrial Co-operative Society founded by ribbon makers in the parish of Foleshill, Coventry in 1832. In 1968, Lockhurst Lane merged with the Coventry and District Co-operative Society, which had been formed as the Coventry Perseverance Co-operative Society in 1867.

Founded in 1844, East Mercia Co-operative Society was the product of a series of mergers, most recently between the Nuneaton and Atherstone District Co-operative Society and the Hinckley and Barwell Co-operative Society in 1980. The two businesses merged in 1992, forming the Coventry and East Mercia Co-operative Society before adopting the Heart of England name in 2000.

== Activities ==
According to the International Co-operative Alliance, "A co-operative is an autonomous association of persons united voluntarily to meet their common economic, social and cultural needs and aspirations through a jointly-owned and democratically controlled enterprise."

Today, the Society operates The Co-operative Food and The Co-operative Funeralcare. Membership is open to all residents of its trading area, with members receiving a share of the profits in the form of dividend.

== Non-food closure ==
In September 2015 it was announced that the society was to close all of its non food division, the first store closure was its Coventry Home and Living store, which closed on 24 October 2015.

The rest of the non food stores closed within the 12 months from September 2015.

== See also ==
- British co-operative movement
- Credit unions in the United Kingdom
