= Northcountry Cooperative Development Fund =

- Company type: Community development financial institution
- Industry: Cooperative banking
- Founded: 1978
- Headquarters: Minneapolis, Minnesota,
- Key people: Christina Jennings, executive director
- Website: www.ncdf.coop

Northcountry Cooperative Development Fund (NCDF) changed its name to Shared Capital Cooperative in 2016. Shared Capital Cooperative is a cooperatively owned community-development loan fund whose mission is to build a just, equitable and democratic economy by investing in cooperative enterprises. Based in Minneapolis-St. Paul, Minnesota, Shared Capital currently serves more than 300 member cooperatives throughout the US, including natural food, consumer, producer, housing and worker-owned cooperatives. Since its founding as NCDF in 1978, Shared Capital Cooperative has originated over $70 million in cooperative financing.
