= Pioneer Telephone Cooperative (Oklahoma) =

Telecommunications company

Pioneer Telephone
- Company type: Cooperative
- Industry: Telecommunications
- Headquarters: Kingfisher, OK
- Website: gopioneer.com

Pioneer Telephone Cooperative is a cooperatively owned telecommunications company that provides telephone and other telecommunications services in a large portion of the state of Oklahoma.

Its headquarters are in Kingfisher, Oklahoma. It was established in 1953 and currently is reported to be the third largest telephone cooperative in the United States with more than 150,000 customers.

Pioneer is particularly advanced in some of its service offerings, operating an extensive broadband network that makes high-speed broadband and DSL available to 95% of its members. IPTV service was inaugurated in 2004.
