= Scotmid =

UK independent retail consumers' co-operative

Scottish Midland Co-operative Society Limited
- Trade name: Scotmid
- Type: Consumer co-operative
- Industry: Retail, property, funeral services
- Founded: 1859; 167 years ago in Edinburgh, Scotland
- Headquarters: Edinburgh, Scotland
- Area served: Scotland, Northern Ireland, Northern England
- Key people: Eddie Thorn (President); Karen Scott (CEO)
- Revenue: £385.0 million (2020)
- Operating income: £7.6 million (2020)
- Net income: £4.5 million (2020)
- Members: 155,997 (2020)
- Number of employees: 3,880 (2020)
- Website: scotmid.coop

Scottish Midland Co-operative Society Limited, trading as Scotmid, is an independent retail consumers' co-operative based in Edinburgh, Scotland.

Originally founded as St. Cuthbert's Co-operative Society in 1859, it merged with Dalziel Co-operative Society of Motherwell in 1981 to form Scotmid.

With over 3,900 staff, the co-operative has 177 Scotmid supermarkets and convenience stores, nine Lakes & Dales convenience stores, a small portfolio of residential and commercial premises,17 funeral offices, and 89 Semichem health and beauty shops throughout Scotland, Northern Ireland and northern England.

== Governance ==
Like most other retail consumers' co-operatives in the United Kingdom, Scotmid is incorporated as a registered society.

Scotmid has a committee style governance structure, similar to The Co-operative Group prior to its own major governance reforms. Scotmid Board Directors are nominated by Regional Committee members and elected by members from the Regions they represent (if these positions are contested).

== History ==
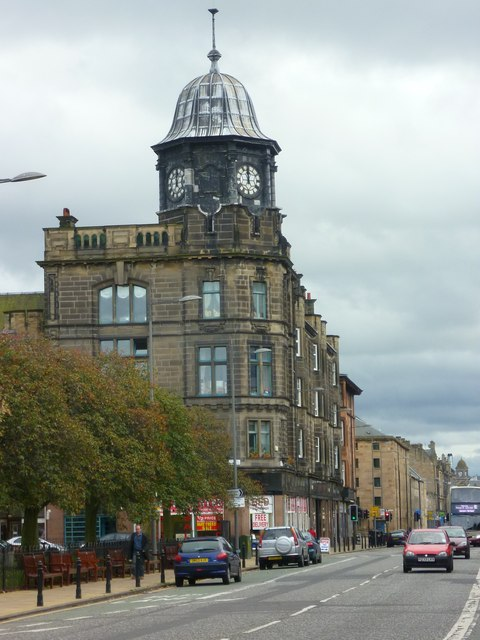
The former Leith Provident Co-operative building at the west end of Great Junction Street has a distinctive domed octagonal clock tower, forming a major landmark.

In 1968, Leith Provident's 1911 department store on Great Junction Street was still operating a then unusual overhead wire system that transported a customer's payment and dividend number from the sales assistant to the cashier, returning change and receipt.

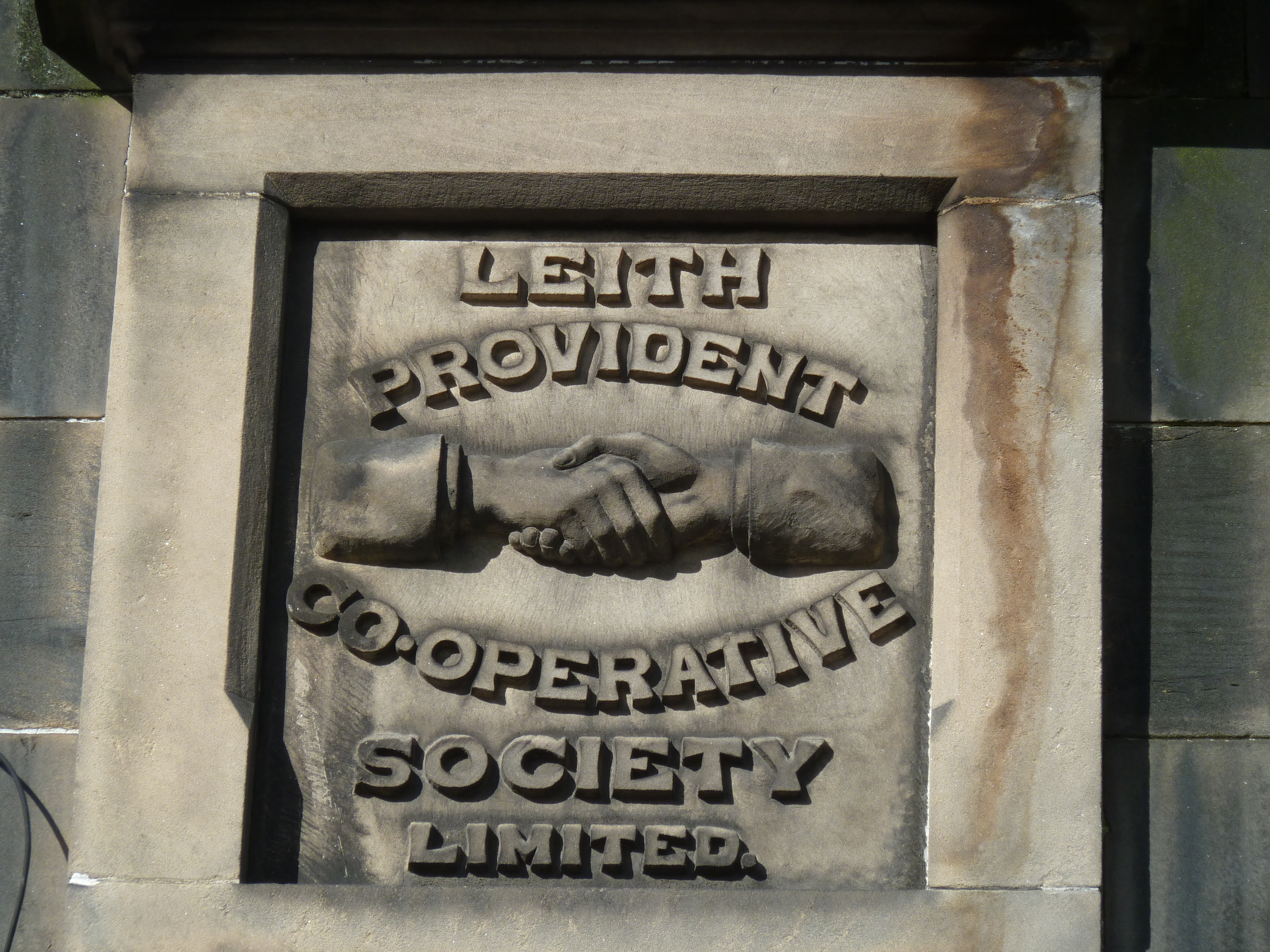
Relief sculpture at premises once owned by Leith Provident Co-operative Society Limited in Dalmeny Street, Edinburgh, from 1890

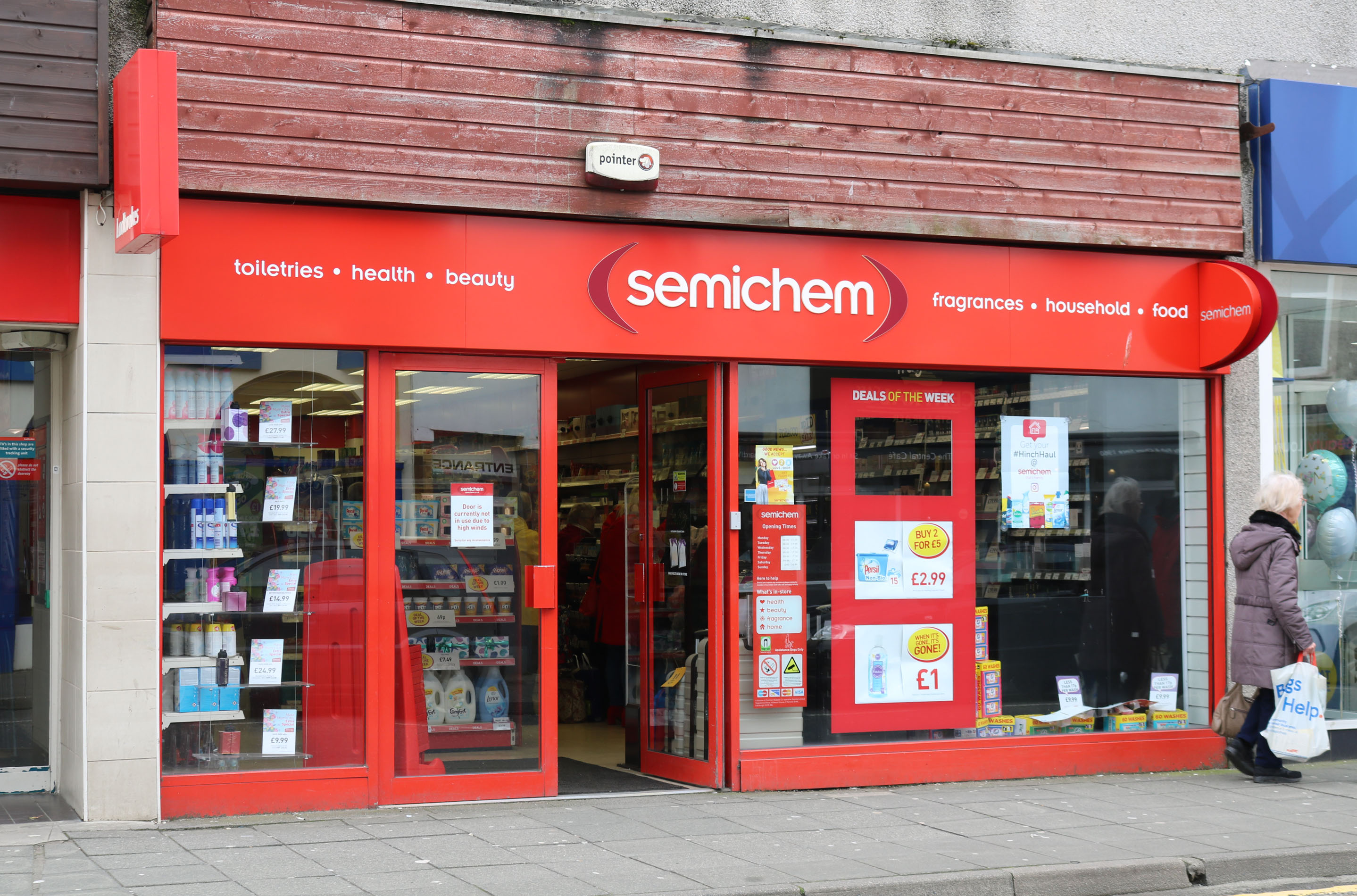
Semichem store in Stranraer, Dumfries and Galloway

In 1995, Scotmid acquired the Scottish health and beauty retail chain Semi-Chem (since rebranded Semichem), followed in 1999 by the similar Northern Ireland business, Options. Also in 1999, Scotmid merged with Prestonpans Co-operative Society.

In 2000, Scotmid closed all 20 of its non-food department stores, which had made losses for five successive years.

In 2003, Scotmid acquired Wakefield-based national distribution business, M & S Toiletries, which it sold in 2008 to Sert UK.

In the early 21st century, Scotmid acquired several competing convenience shops in Scotland: Alldays, 64 SPAR shops and Morning, Noon & Night.

Scotmid added Dundas Fyfe funeral directors to its funeral operation in a reported £1 million buy-out deal. The head office moved from Fountainbridge, Edinburgh, where it had been since 1859, to a new purpose-built office near Newbridge.

The Fragrance House was founded by Scotmid in 2009. It specializes in perfume and by 2011 had five shops in Scotland with plans to expand to England and Northern Ireland.

On 31 March 2021, it was announced that "up to 22" Semichem stores would close.

=== Morning, Noon & Night ===
Morning Noon & Night was a Scottish convenience shop chain set up in Dundee in 1991, by retailing executive Eddie Thompson (who became chairman of Dundee United in 2002.)

In 2004, Thompson sold the company to Scotmid for £30 million.

This allowed Scotmid to add the 50 Morning, Noon & Night shops to its portfolio letting it expand into areas of Scotland, such as the Highlands, where it didn't previously have any shops.

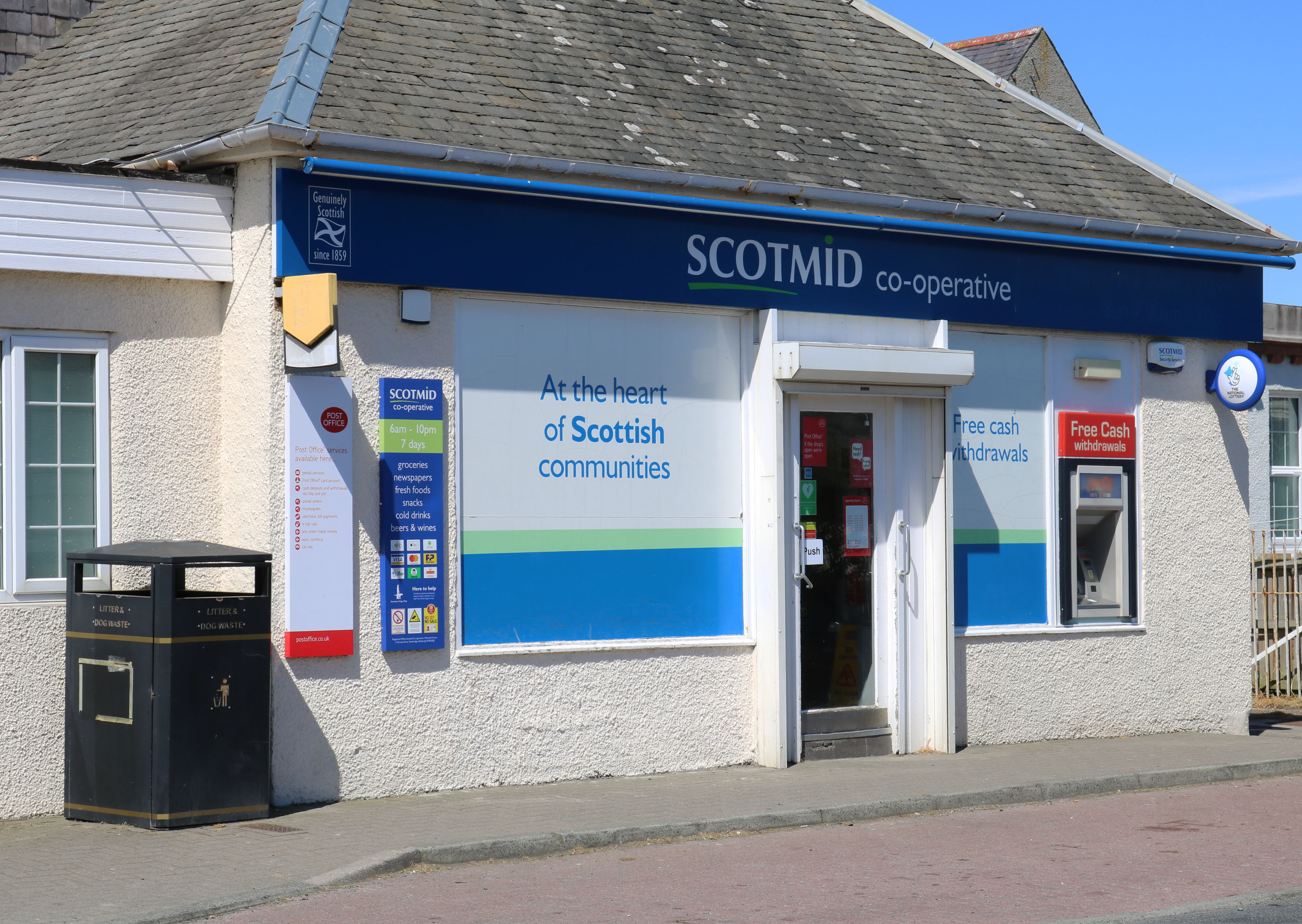
Scotmid store in Ballantrae, South Ayrshire in 2019

=== Botterills Convenience Stores ===
Botterills Convenience Stores was a Scottish convenience shop founded in Blantyre, South Lanarkshire in the 1950s by the Botterill family. Trading under the name of "Botterills of Blantyre" and latterly under the SPAR banner, it ranked 19th in The Grocers Top 50 independent grocery retailers. Owner Jim Botterill sold his 51 shops to Scotmid in November 2010 for an undisclosed sum, enabling Scotmid to extend its territory south and west.

=== Lakes & Dales Co-operative ===
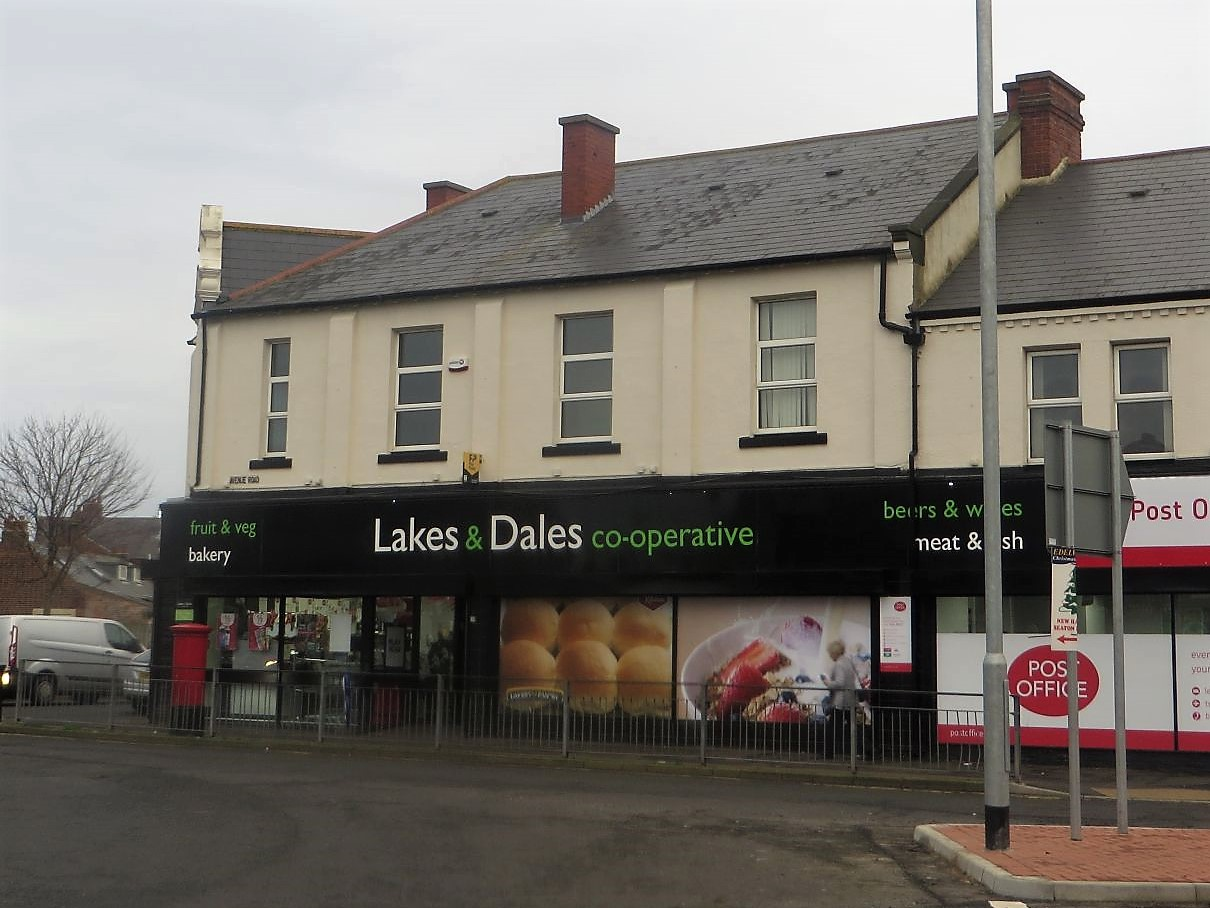
A Lakes & Dales store in Seaton Delaval, Northumberland following the merger with Scotmid.

In 2013 Scotmid merged with the Penrith Co-operative Society which had at the time of merger operated a department store and attached supermarket in Penrith, Cumbria and 7 small food shops in Cumbria and County Durham the Penrith shops are to be rebranded as the Lakes & Dales Co-operative. The first shop to be rebranded was the Lazonby branch. In early 2015 the non food departments of the Penrith shop were closed and in February 2016 the rest of the shop closed.

In 2015 Scotmid merged with the Northumbrian Seaton Valley Co-operative Society adding its shops to the Lakes & Dales chain.

== See also ==
- British co-operative movement
- Credit unions in the United Kingdom
