= Penrith Co-operative Society =

Former retail co-operative in the UK

Penrith Co-operative Society Limited
- Type: Consumer co-operative
- Industry: Retail (Grocery), Department Store
- Founded: 14 April 1890; 136 years ago
- Defunct: 2013; 13 years ago
- Headquarters: Penrith, Cumbria, England
- Area served: Cumbria and County Durham
- Website: penrithco-op.co.uk

Penrith Co-operative Society Limited, trading as Penrith Co-op, was a small regional consumer co-operative in the United Kingdom. The society was formed in 1890 and at the time of its merger with Scotmid it operated one department store with supermarket attached and eight small supermarkets or convenience stores in Cumbria and County Durham.

== History ==
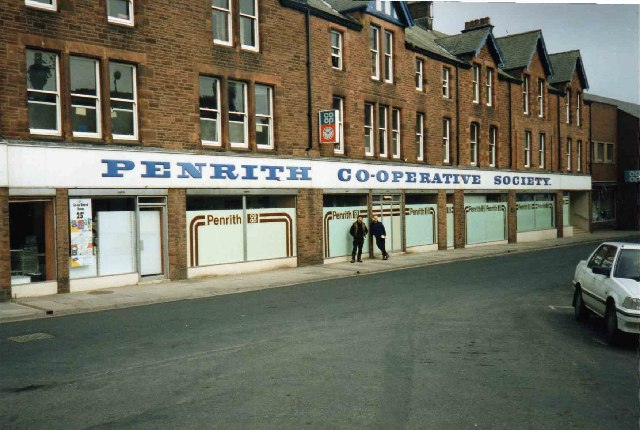
In the early 1990s, the society maintained a distinctive local identity, alongside the 1968 national Co-op cloverleaf visible in the windows of its Burrowgate premises

When most other co-operatives in Cumbria merged into regional groups in the 1960s and 1970s, such as the Cumbrian Society and the Greater Lancastria Society (now both part of The Co-operative Group), the Penrith society remained independent and has since taken over other small societies. These included the Keswick Co-operative Society in 1969; the Lazonby & District Co-operative Society in 1990; the Naworth Collieries Co-operative Society in 1993 which had branches in the small north Pennine villages of Hallbankgate and Halton-Lea-Gate and finally in 2002, the Stanhope & Weardale Co-operative Society.

The Penrith Co-op was featured on a 2006 episode of the national BBC Television programme Working Lunch for its support of the Melmerby village store set up by residents. The Melmerby village shop has since closed down.

In June 2013 it was announced that they were proposing a merger with Scottish giant Co-operative Scotmid, subject to membership approval. The merger was completed in October 2013 with the stores to be refurbished and rebranded as the Lakes & Dales Co-operative, the first store that was rebranded was the Lazonby branch.

In 2015 Scotmid closed the non-food departments of the Penrith store and refurbished and made smaller the food departments. This was ultimately unsuccessful, and the entire store closed in February 2016.

== Operations ==
In 2008, the society began refurbishing its Penrith department store and supermarket, with a new theme of "the Number 19 Department Store", with its various departments labelled or branded as being "@19", such as the new brand for the clothing department: "Style@19".

=== Head Office, No. 19 department store and Penrith supermarket ===
The premises at 19 Burrowgate, Penrith housed the following departments: grocery, butchery, bakery, fashion, electronics, homewares, beds, furniture, carpets and cafe.

=== Branches in 2013 ===
- Keswick Foodstore & Electrical Store, St James Court, Keswick, Cumbria
- Lazonby Foodstore and Post Office, Lazonby, Cumbria
- Shap Supermarket, Main Street, Shap Cumbria
- Hallbankgate Foodstore and Post Office, Hallbankgate, Cumbria
- Stanhope Foodstore, Off Licence and Handybank, Front Street, Stanhope, County Durham
- St Johns Chapel Foodstore, Market Place, St John's Chapel, County Durham
- Westgate Foodstore, Front Street, Westgate, County Durham
- Frosterley Foodstore & Post Office, Front Street, Frosterley, County Durham

=== Branches closed before 2013 ===
- Great Dockray, Penrith (the society's original store, 1890 and 1893)
- Castlegate, Penrith (the society's 2nd store 1893-1901, closed on move to Burrowgate)
- Castletown, Penrith (closed c.1970)
- Halton Lea Gate
- Scotland Road, Townhead, Penrith (closed c.1970)
- Penrith Pharmacy, (became part of department store in the 1980s and later closed)
- Glenridding
- Shap No2 and No 5
- Keswick Home Store
- Wearhead (closed 2005)

=== Other operations ===
The society for many years ran mobile shops visiting various villages and hamlets in the Penrith area.

Penrith Co-op built and owned several residential properties in Penrith, including Holyoake Terrace, Norfolk Road, in Castletown and Walker Rise at Fair Hill.

== Co-operative movement ==
The society was a member of the UK-wide Co-operative Retail Trading Group (CRTG) and sold The Co-operative brand products. It was also a corporate member of a hybrid consumer and wholesale co-operative, the Co-operative Group.

In 2005, Rochdale-based United Co-operatives bought a private sector pharmacy shop in Penrith, which changed its name to Co-operative Pharmacy. However, this shop had no connection with Penrith Co-op's operations and, since United merged with the Co-operative Group in 2007, it formed part of the Co-operative Group Pharmacy division which has since been sold to The Bestway Group.

In 2010 the Co-operative Group rebranded the Penrith branch of Somerfield as a Co-operative Food store. Until 2015, when the store closed, Penrith had two Co-op stores owned by two separate societies.

== Sources ==
- Mullett, Michael A. (2022). A New history of Penrith: book VI: Penrith in the twentieth century, 1900-1974: essays on the public realm. Carlisle: Bookcase. pp. 1–346, pp.126-131. ISBN 9781912181520.
