= Pauline Green =

British Labour politician

Dame Pauline Green DBE
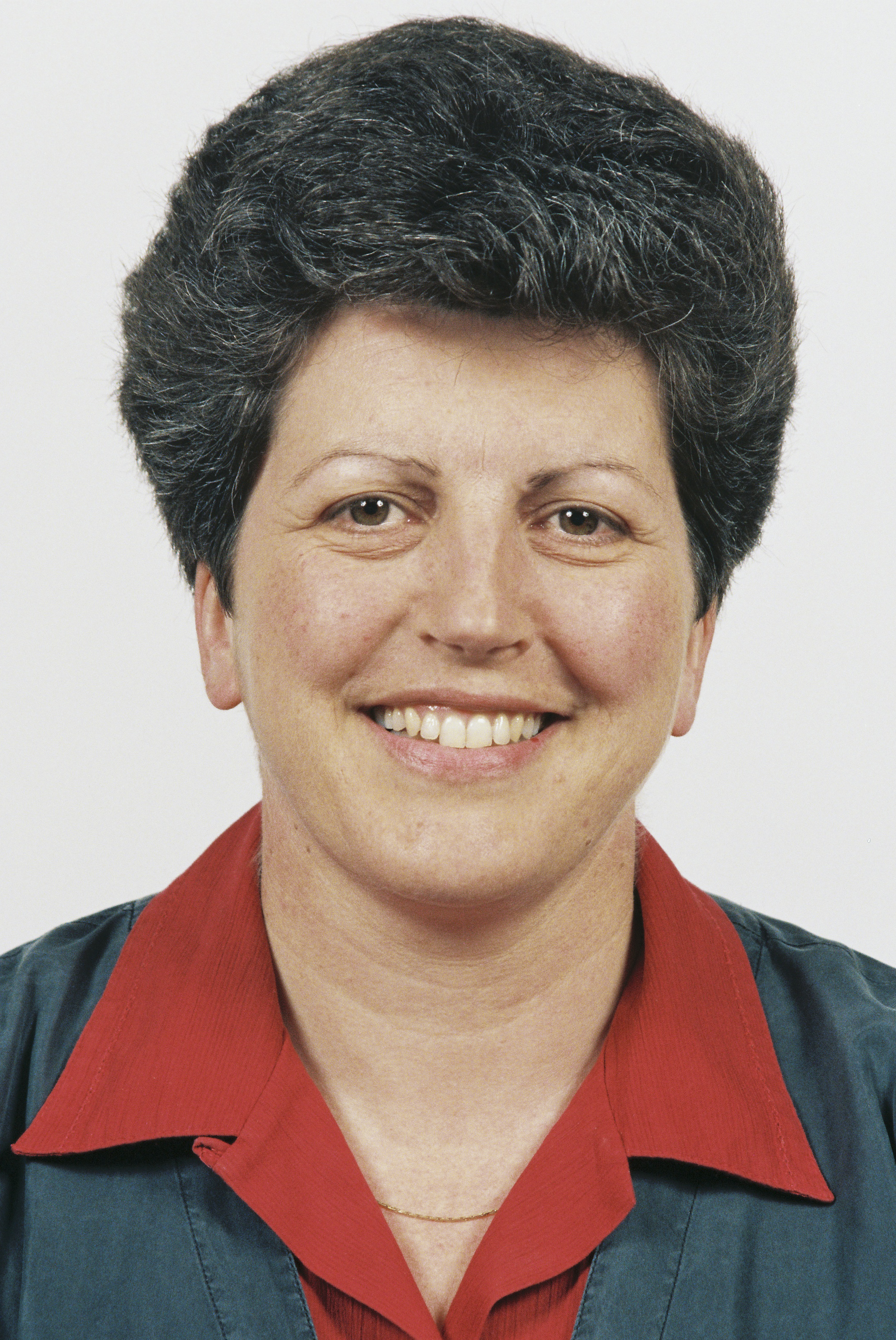
- Green in 1994

President of the International Co-operative Alliance
- In office November 2009 – June 2015
- Preceded by: Ivano Barberini
- Succeeded by: Monique F. Leroux

Chief Executive of Co-operatives UK
- In office 1 January 2000 – 9 October 2009
- Preceded by: Lloyd Wilkinson (The Co-operative Union)
- Succeeded by: Ed Mayo (Secretary General)

President of ICA Europe
- In office 2002 – November 2009
- Preceded by: Lars Hillbom

President, Co-operative Congress
- In office 1997–1997
- Preceded by: GW Money, MBE
- Succeeded by: Alan Middleton

Leader of the Parliamentary Group of the Party of European Socialists
- In office 1994–1999
- Preceded by: Jean-Pierre Cot
- Succeeded by: Enrique Barón Crespo

Leader of the European Parliamentary Labour Party
- In office June 1993 – 1994
- Preceded by: Glyn Ford
- Succeeded by: Wayne David

Member of the European Parliament for London London North (1989–1999)
- In office 15 June 1989 – 15 December 1999
- Preceded by: John Leslie Marshall
- Succeeded by: Mary Honeyball

Personal details
- Born: Pauline Wiltshire; 8 December 1948 (age 77) Gżira, Crown Colony of Malta
- Party: Labour and Co-operative
- Spouse: Paul Green
- Education: Open University, London School of Economics

Dame Pauline Green, DBE (born 8 December 1948) is a former Labour and Co-operative Member of the European Parliament and former Leader of the Parliamentary Group of the Party of European Socialists (PES). As leader of the Parliamentary Group of the PES, she had a central role in the controversy surrounding the failure to discharge the European Commission (EC)'s 1996 budget, bringing the first motion of censure against the commission but voting against it. She then changed her position following corruption allegations raised by EC official Paul van Buitenen to call for Jacques Santer (then President of the European Commission) to react promptly or be sacked. Green lost the leadership of the PES in 1999, which was attributed in part to her handling of the incident.

Following her re-election as an MEP in 1999, Green announced that she was retiring from politics to take up a position as the first female Chief Executive of Co-operatives UK, a position that she held until 2009. Her work with the organisation included sitting on and responding to the recommendations of the Co-operative Commission, facilitating the organisation's merger with the Industrial Common Ownership Movement (ICOM) and working to "secure and celebrate" the Co-operative Advantage.

In the 2003 New Year Honours Green was appointed as a Dame Commander of the Most Excellent Order of the British Empire (DBE) while also holding the office of the President of ICA Europe until her election as President of the International Co-operative Alliance (ICA) in November 2009.

As with her appointment to Co-operatives UK, she is the first female president in the organisation's history.

== Early life ==
Green was born Pauline Wiltshire in Gżira on the island of Malta to an English soldier serving with the Royal Artillery and his Maltese sweetheart in 1948. The family moved between Malta, Egypt and Germany, following Green's father wherever he was stationed. As a result, Green spent "a lot of [her] very young days in army barracks" and "missed out on secondary and further education".

Following her father's return to civilian life, the family moved to Kilburn in London when Green was aged fourteen, and – acquiescing to her father's wishes that she did something "safe and steady" – Green studied for an Ordinary National Diploma in business studies. She started her career as a secretary with a wallpaper manufacturers, before joining the Metropolitan Police on her 21st birthday. She later said that it was working on the beat and witnessing first hand the cycle of those caught in poverty turning to crime that turned her into a socialist.

In 1971, she was working in the West Hampstead division when she met and married PC Paul Green, resigning from the force in 1974 five months before the birth of her first child. Paul Green went on to become Chief Superintendent Green, borough commander for Brent, and was awarded the Queen's Police Medal in the 1999 New Year's Honours before retiring in 2000. He and Green divorced in 2003.

Whilst staying at home to look after her two children (a son and a daughter), Green studied for a degree from the Open University. She then spent two full-time years studying at the LSE for an MSc (Econ) in Comparative Government. She spent two years between 1982 and 1984 as a lecturer at Barnet College of Further Education, before becoming an assistant teacher at a Special Educational Unit. During this period Green was increasing active in local politics, becoming secretary and then chair of the Chipping Barnet Labour Party, before standing in (and losing) the elections for a seat on the area's council in 1986. In 1985, she left her teaching career to become Parliamentary Advisor on European Affairs to the Co-operative Union, a position which she left in 1989 as her political career began.

== Political career ==
=== Early career ===
Due to the changing political landscape, Green found that her job increasingly saw her lobbying to Brussels, with her particular interest being a directive backed by the co-operative movement creating common standards for food hygiene across Europe. In June 1989, she announced her intention to stand for a seat in the European elections to help ensure the adoption of the draft directive. She visited "most of the 65 local branches" of the constituency of London North and won the seat with a majority of 5,387. She was re-elected to the seat in 1994 with a majority of 48,348.

Green was elected Leader of the European Parliamentary Labour Party (EPLP) in 1993, beating incumbent leader Glyn Ford. She only served for one year, however, after having been chosen and championed by then Labour leader John Smith to become the new leader of the Parliamentary Group of the PES.

At the 1994 Party Leaders' Conference in Corfu, a "package deal" was agreed to fill the upcoming political posts, and it was agreed that Green would take the leadership post with strong backing from the Labour contingent. Green was strongly involved in the fight against Apartheid in South Africa.

Ian White, an MEP elected at the same time as Green, said: "Although the parliamentary group formally elected Pauline, the "deal" was put together by the national party leaders. I believe that, had it been an open election, she would have won in any case, hands down, on competence alone."

She held the position for five years (1994–99), and was involved at senior levels of policy making in the European Union and member governments. In 1998 there were rumours that she would stand to be Labour's candidate for Mayor of London. Whilst she expressed an interest in the position, she maintained that she would not be able to commit to the position until after the 1999 leadership elections because of her European commitments.

=== Controversies ===
Green was seen as a strong advocate of EU parliamentary and institutional reform: she was vocal in her criticisms of any hint of impropriety, for example calling ex-commissioner Martin Bangemann's appointment to Spanish telecommunications giant Telefonica "sleaze soaked" for the impression it gave that he had used his position in the EC for his own advantage – even though he had broken no rules. However, her own final year as leader saw its own controversy with allegations of corruption against the EC.

One of the Parliament's duties was to discharge the budget, confirming that the year's spending had been in line with the plans originally set by the EC and that the money had been spent honestly and efficiently. However, the parliamentary budget committee decided that it could not fulfill this duty with regard to the 1996 budget until points concerning the reduction of fraud in the transport system had been clarified. For six months, the debate raged, with Green initially supporting the campaign to discharge the budget (whilst calling for more radical change), but only after a group of specialists that included two senior Socialist MEPs announced that there had been a slight improvement. Parties from the centre and the right began to claim that the PES were only supporting their own members, and ultimately the move to discharge the budget was defeated.

It was then that Green asserted that the argument would normally be solved in a national democracy by a vote of confidence: since that option did not exist in EU legislation, she instead tabled a motion of censure against the EC. Green explained that "One of the fundamental reasons for tabling this motion of censure was to decide now – immediately – whether or not the European Commission is able to do its work."

Because of their belief that the EC should be allowed to continue its reform work, Green and the PES Parliamentary Group announced that they would be voting against their own motion of censure – effectively trying to defeat a call for the sacking of the EC that they had made.

As the argument continued, the parliament also refused to discharge the 1997 budget – and at the same time, allegations of corruption were made against the French commissioner Édith Cresson. Commission official Paul van Buitenen accused Cresson of having employed her friend and dentist for eight months as a special advisor on the Environment, at a cost of £30,000. The position was described by sub-contractors in sworn statements as a job "for which he is not required to do any work". The EC agreed to launch an enquiry in return for the parliament ending its moves to censure the commission.

The eventual report found that the allegations were correct, and Green joined those calling for Santer to respond promptly or risk losing his own position. A second censure motion was tabled, but before it was voted on the entire EC resigned – although they were still allowed to keep their salaries and jobs as an interim arrangement to electing a new Commission. Green saw the resignation as an opportunity to improve the running of the EU, in particularly the ability of the parliament to veto the appointment of the next head of the commission. She said: "We have to use this opportunity to keep pushing for more openness, more transparency, more public control and accountability in the way Europe is run. We now have a real opportunity to go to the voters in the June elections and prove to them that the European Parliament has done its job and changed the political culture of Brussels once and for all."

The EU member governments – including Tony Blair's – were not keen on extending the Parliament's powers, but on May Day the Amsterdam Treaty came into effect, which extended their influence somewhat. The Parliament had the opportunity to vote their approval of new EC head Romano Prodi, and did so 392 votes for to 72 against. However, Green's stock was damaged by the long controversy, with even her friends and supporters considering that her handling of the affair did not come across as a coherent strategy, although one commentator at the time did praise the way she had "ridden the Brussels storm with verve and conviction." It was against this background – and allegations that she had improperly used her official car that Green dismissed as a "cheap jibe" that had been blown out of all proportion – that Green had to stand for re-election in her London constituency.

Green retained her seat in the 1999 European Parliament election with a reduced majority of 26,477. This was typical of the Labour Party's performance, with its share of the vote slipping from 44.24% in 1994 to 28.03% causing a resultant reduction in seats from 62 to 29. The European Socialists also did badly in the elections, and lost their dominance of the Parliament, with the European People's Party becoming the largest group in Parliament.

Green was asked by Prime Minister Tony Blair to restand for the Parliamentary Group leadership. However she withdrew when it became clear she faced opposition from Spanish, German and French socialists to allow the brokering of a deal making Robin Cook to become president of the PES (i.e. the wider PES party outside Parliament, not the Parliamentary Group). The following September, she also lost her seat on the Labour National Executive Committee, with the slump in her popularity being largely attributed to her earlier handling of the EC "scandal" and Labour's poor performance in the European parliamentary elections.

In November 1999, Green announced that she would be retiring as an MEP to become the first female chief executive of the Co-operative Union, officially taking up the position on New Year's Day 2000. The decision led to criticism from some quarters, as the mechanics of the electoral system meant that the public would not vote in Green's successor, and instead the next candidate on Labour's list automatically replaced her. Theresa Villiers, a fellow MEP for the Conservatives said Green's "resignation demonstrates a total lack of regard for the electorate".

Green was caught up in further controversy the following year, regarding the list of voters eligible to decide the Labour candidate for the 2000 London Mayor elections. Complaints were made about Green's inclusion on the list despite her resignation as an MEP with her vote reported as being "worth a thousand times that of any ordinary member".

== Co-operation ==
Green already had a track record in the UK co-operative movement. As well as her status as a Labour and Co-operative MEP and advisory position with the Co-operative Union, she had been a Woodcraft Folk leader and was made president of the Industrial Common Ownership Movement (ICOM) in 1999. As an MEP, she had also been elected President of the 1997 Co-operative Congress. She was welcomed to the movement by the 2000 Congress President, Pat Wheatley, who described her as "someone of great wisdom, true co-operative principles" and "a shining example of 'courage under fire'" for her work with the PES.

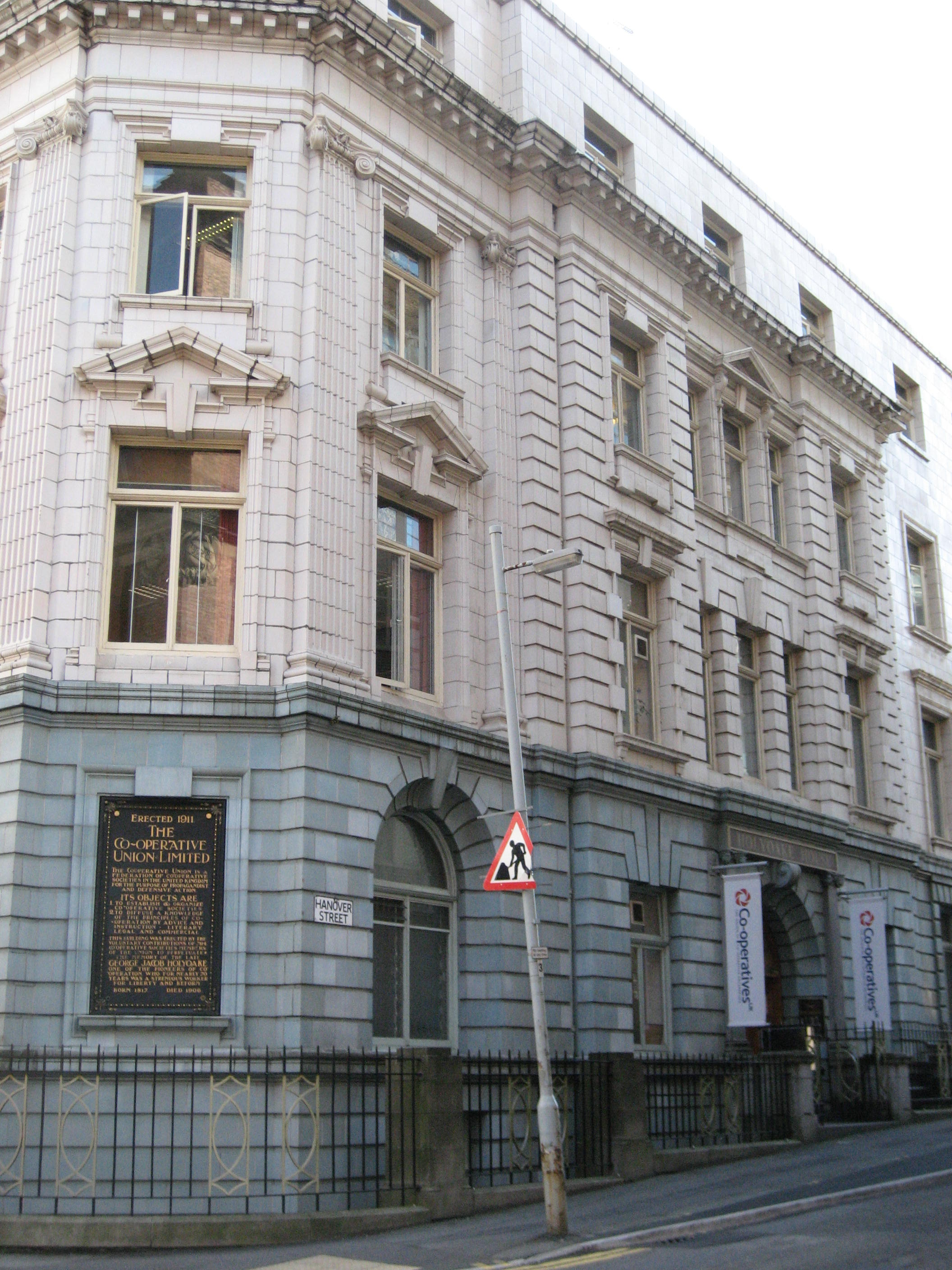
Holyoake House, head office of Co-operatives UK where Green was Chief Executive

Within two weeks of starting work at the Union, Green sat down with other high-profile members of the co-operative movement and drafted a letter to Tony Blair. The letter – signed by Green, Lord Graham of Edmonton, Graham Melmoth, and Len Fyfe – called on the Prime Minister to sponsor a commission to review the co-operative movement and determine its future development and modernisation. The letter arrived against a background of the impending merger of the Co-operative Wholesale Society (CWS) and Co-operative Retail Services to create the Co-operative Group, as well as recent efforts by entrepreneur Andrew Regan to demutualise the CWS. Blair responded favourably to the request, and pledged his support in setting up a Co-operative Commission.

The commission was officially launched under chair John Monks on 24 February 2000, with Green being invited to serve as one of the 12 commissioners. There was a whispering campaign amongst Labour MPs that the commission was intended to look at the party's funding relationship with the co-operative movement, which Green dismissed as "nonsense." The commission's final report was published in January 2001, leaving Green to begin the work of co-ordinating the Union's response.

The Union began a "deliberate attempt to secure and celebrate [the] co-operative advantage" by increasing its ties with other organisations across the co-operative movement: they began providing professional and admin services for the United Kingdom Co-operative Council (UKCC) and ICOM, and working with co-operative support organisations across the country to establish the "first ever 'all movement' Co-ordination Movement". This work continued into 2001, with Green using her joint positions in ICOM and the Union to facilitate a merger of the two organisations, bringing together the worker and consumer co-operative sectors that had existed separately for over 100 years. The membership voted in December 2002 in favour of a change in the Union's name to reflect its new make-up and in January 2003 the organisation was officially relaunched as Co-operatives UK.

Green continued to work at "driving a culture change in Co-operatives UK" – for example leading the organisation to become the first co-operative to partner with the National Association of Co-operative Officials (NACO) as its recognised trade union or successfully opposing recommendations from the International Accounting Standards Board (IASB) that would have seen co-operative members' share capital classed as debt, "destroying" the co-operative advantage.

In October 2002, Green was elected as the President of ICA Europe, the umbrella body for European co-operatives. This led in turn to her becoming co-chair of Cooperatives Europe in November 2006, sharing her duties with Etienne Pflimlin. The organisation was formed by ICA Europe and the Co-ordinating Committee of European Co-operative Organisations (CCACE) to "work together on issues of importance to co-operatives in Europe", following a drive by Green for closer co-operation between the major European co-operative bodies.

Green announced that she intended to retire as chief executive of the organisation in 2009, saying: "I will be 60 at [that time] and I have always intended to retire when I reached that milestone. The Board [of Co-operatives UK] and I agreed that it made sense for me to finish after Co-operative Congress 2009, which is, to all intents and purposes, the end of our co-operative year." She was succeeded in November 2009 by Ed Mayo.

Green was elected chair of the board of Supporters Direct following her retirement from Co-operatives UK, and also elected President of the International Co-operative Alliance (ICA). Following her election, she stood down from her position within Co-operatives Europe. She resigned as President of the ICA, two years before her term ended, as the result of The Co-operative Group cutting its financial support for the ICA.

== Honours ==
In 1988, Green was awarded honorary Doctorates from the University of North London and Middlesex University, and was made Commander of the Order of Honour in 1994 by the President of Greece. She has since been awarded the Grand Golden Cross with Star by the President of the Republic of Austria, and been made Grand Commander of the Order of Merit of the Republic of Cyprus. In the New Year's Honours 2003 Green was appointed as a Dame Commander of the Most Excellent Order of the British Empire (DBE) "for services to the Co-operative Movement and to the development of the European Union"

She has been described as "strong, confident and well organised" by Neil Kinnock, "a refreshing no-nonsense figure" by Phillip Whitehead and "guided by common sense and an antagonism (which amounts almost to contempt) towards the superficialities of political image-making" by Roy Hattersley.

Party political offices
Preceded by Glyn Ford	Leader of the European Parliamentary Labour Party; 1993–1994	Succeeded by Wayne David
Non-profit organization positions
Preceded by Lloyd Wilkinson	General Secretary of the Co-operative Union; 2000–2009	Succeeded by Ed Mayo
Preceded by Ivano Barberini	President of the International Co-operative Alliance; 2009–2015	Succeeded by Monique Leroux
