= LADDER project =

European development education and awarenness raising project

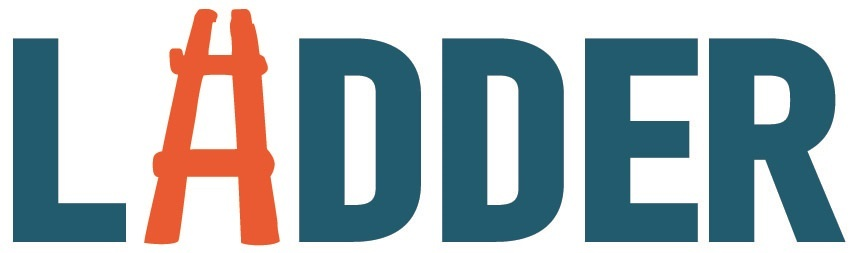
LADDER project

The Local Authorities as Drivers for Development Education and Raising-Awareness Project or LADDER Project, was launched by the European Association for Local Democracy, in 2015 with the objective of develop and increase the action of Local Authorities in European Union policies of Development Education and Awareness Raising (DEAR). The associates of this project work with education and awareness raising as a tool to trigger and foster the process of a resilient, sustainable development through a peaceful and democratic way.

Since its beginning, this project has provided a space to discuss how to improve the promotion of Development Education at the local level, how Local Authorities and Civil Society Organizations are essential for DEAR and how to efficiently act local by thinking global. Its relevance is due to the diversity of partners and associates it involves, including local authorities, NGOs, networks of civil society organizations and experts in the field, from 35 countries, 18 from the European Union and 17 non-EU countries. LADDER is co-funded by the European Union, and has a duration of 36 months (January 2015 – December 2017). The activities are organised along six thematic paths (Youth in development, Migration, Citizens’ participation in development, Public-private cooperation in development, Environmental and sustainable development, European Year for Development and follow up) and three geographical areas (Mediterranean area, South Eastern Europe, Eastern Partnership), which are combined according to the interests of the partners and associates.

== Background ==
This project is a follow up of the Working Together for Development (WTD) project, which focused on information, training, networking for local authorities associations and civil society organisations in the field of development cooperation. The great majority of the partners of this former project are the ones that integrate the LADDER initiative, conducting a series of capacity building seminars & trainings, exchange meetings, conferences and events at all levels.

== Partners and Associates ==
The LADDER Project has 25 partners and 18 associates.

Partners of LADDER	Country
European Association for Local Democracy	Italy
Foster Europe - Foundation for strong European Regions	Austria
Young European Federalists	Belgium
ENNA - European Network of National Civil Society Associations	Belgium
UBBSLA - Union of Bulgarian Black Sea Local Authorities	Bulgaria
NAMRB - National Association of Municipalities in the Republic of Bulgaria	Bulgaria
CAC - Croatian Association of Counties	Croatia
Municipality of Vejle	Denmark
NALAG - National Association of Local Authorities of Georgia	Georgia
EGTC Amphictyony	Greece
Donegal County Council	Ireland
TECLA - Associazione di Enti Locali per la Cooperazione Territoriale	Italy
CIME - Consiglio Italiano del Movimento Europeo	Italy
COPPEM - Comitato Permanente per il Partenariato Euromediterraneo delle Autorità Locali e le Regioni	Italy
Progettarte Associazione culturale	Italy
LALRG - Latvian Association of Local and Regional Authorities	Latvia
SOS Malta ' Solidarity Overseas Service Malta	Malta
Birgu Local Council	Malta
URC - Union of Rural Communes of the Republic of Poland	Poland
SKGO - Standing Conference of Towns and Municipalities	Serbia
CEECN - Central and Eastern European Citizens Network	Slovakia
UTC - Union of Towns and Cities of Slovakia	Slovakia
SLOGA - Slovenian Global Action	Slovenia
The Hague Academy for Local Governance	Netherlands
Lam Echaml Association	Tunisia

Associates of LADDER Project	Country
ADD-Medenine - Association pour le Développement Durable	Tunisia
AAM - Albanian Association of Municipalities	Albania
FACM - Algerian Forum for Citizenship and Modernity	Algeria
ALI - Agency for Legislative Initiatives (Лабораторія законодавчих ініціатив)	Ukraine
AMR - Romanian Municipalities Association	Romania
AKM - Association of Kosovo Municipalities	Kosovo*
ALAL - Association of Local Authorities in Lithuania	Lithuania
BINA - NGO Alliance for Municipality Development	Azerbaijan
CALM - Congress of Local Authorities from Moldova	Moldova
North-South Centre of the Council of Europe	Portugal
CFOA - Communities Finance Officers Association	Armenia
CIRa - Center for Institutional Development	Macedonia
CISP - Comitato Internazionale per le Sviluppo dei Popoli	Italy
CIVICUS - World Alliance for Citizen Participation	South Africa
CLRA-CoE - Congress of Local and Regional Authorities, Council of Europe	France
Lev Sapieha	Belarus
ESMESS - Réseau Marocain de lÉconomie Sociale et Solidaire	Morocco
SEEYN - South East European Youth Network	Bosnia-Herzegovina
New Israel Fund - Shatil	Israel
UMM - Union of Municipalities of Marmara	Turkey
