= Co-operative Commission =

Review of the British co-operative movement

The Co-operative Commission was an independent commission set up by Tony Blair at the request of leaders of the British co-operative movement. Its aim was to review the strategy and structures of the sector, with an aim to suggesting ways to develop and modernise the movement, and its members comprised "business leaders, politicians, trade unionists and co-operators" under the chairmanship of the General Secretary of the TUC. It was the second review of its kind in the entire history of the Co-operative Movement.

The commission was announced on 24 February 2000, and published its findings in the document the co-operative advantage: Creating a successful family of Co-operative businesses in January 2001.

== Gaitskell Commission ==
The first Co-operative Commission was the Independent Co-operative Commission set up in 1956, following a resolution by the 1955 Co-operative Congress of the Co-operative Union calling for a commission to prepare a report and recommendations "designed to secure the greatest possible advantage to the Movement from its manufacturing, wholesale and retail resources". The Commission - which was also known as the Gaitskell Commission after its chair Hugh Gaitskell - was initially set up to consider co-operative production, but had its mandate broadened to consider co-operative retailing as well. The membership of the commission - selected as "suitable persons not engaged in Co-operative management or administration" - was as follows:

- Hugh Gaitskell (chair)
- Tony Crosland (Secretary)
- Miss Margaret Digby
- Professor D T Jack
- Dr J B Jefferys
- Lady Hall
- Colonel S G L Hardie
- Mr. J T Murray
- Alderman F Pette

The commission was set up in response to the co-operative movement experiencing its first ever halt in its growth, caused by the massive changes in retailing following the end of rationing and the beginning of self-service. The co-operative movement still had a large presence in the retail market, with 30,000 shops, 250 factories and 967 retail societies paying dividends to their customer members of over £40m a year. However, these payments were often made at the expense of retained capital, and there was growing concern about the movements ability to fund its future development. There was also concern about the movement's market share, with 1957 seeing the co-operative share at 11.62% whilst the new supermarkets - luring customers away with competitive prices the movement's structure wouldn't allow it to match - had a 25% share.

Over nearly three years, the Gaitskell Commission held 35 meetings, carried out visits and launched formal and informal consultations before publishing its final report in 1958. The report made 51 recommendations on a variety of issues, including recommending that society's start selling products at market prices and stop expecting the dividend to compensate for high prices, whilst its final recommendation was that the movement should hold similar reviews "at least once a decade": this went unheeded until the 2000 commission was established.

Despite being described by the 2000 commission as "prescient in its analysis, and right in nearly everything it recommended", the report failed to have significant impact for the movement, with most of the recommendations being ignored or brought about by circumstance rather than by free adoption. In its 1967 Regional Plan, the Co-operative Union concluded that "If the serious warnings of the Independent Commission had been heeded, the Movement would be in far better shape to withstand the impact of new problems which have developed". Instead, supermarkets such as Sainsbury's and Marks & Spencer emerged as serious competitors to the co-operative retail movement.

== Monks Commission ==
=== Establishment ===
The Co-operative Movement existed under the threat of demutualisation, whereby a society could be turned into a private company and its assets taken out of the hands of its members and placed under the control of private shareholders. The Co-operative Wholesale Society Ltd (CWS) was particularly attractive to "demutualisers" because of the size of its assets, turnover and customer base, and in 1997 entrepreneur Andrew Regan began making an attempt to demutualise the CWS. He made a bid of £1.2bn for the co-operative, which was rejected by the members but led to two senior CWS executives being dismissed, and ultimately jailed for accepting a bribe for an unrelated transaction via a company that CWS sold to Regan. The bid had the benefit of shining a spotlight on the Movement's weaknesses, and it came to realise that its best long-term defence was to operate successful co-operative businesses: that they must succeed "as [businesses], in terms of [their] performance – and as [Co-operatives], meeting [their] social goals".

Combined with this, the UK's two biggest co-operative societies were in the early stages of merging. Co-operative Retail Services (CRS) had been ailing for some time, reporting an operating loss of nearly £60m in 1999, and its board and members recognised the benefits that would come from combining with the CWS - large reductions in operating costs could quickly be achieved by a merger. CRS was originally CWS Retail, formed by CWS in 1934 to open shops in "co-operative deserts" and take over ailing retail societies, eventually becoming a separate entity and taking the CRS name in 1957. Members voted on the merger on 4 March 2000, and it would change the shape of the retail co-operative movement once confirmed.

Against this background, the Chairman of the United Kingdom Co-operative Council (Lord Graham of Edmonton), the new Chief Executive of the Co-operative Union (Pauline Green), the Chief Executive of CWS (Graham Melmoth) and the Chairman of CWS and Chief Executive of Midlands Co-operative Society (Len Fyfe) sent a letter to the Prime Minister on 14 January 2000. The letter emphasised the Co-operative Movements' community involvement and ethical principles (as laid down by the Rochdale Principles), and asked for Blair to help the movement develop and modernise to "meet the challenges of the next millennium": the Prime Minister was asked to create and sponsor a Co-operative Commission in the mould of the Gaitskell Commission, and was provided with terms of reference for the proposed group. The Prime Minister responded in a letter confirming that he would be "delighted to help in the establishment of the commission, and to support your desire for a fundamental review", and that he had appointed John Monks to chair the commission.

The commission was formally announced on 24 February 2000, with its members meeting for the first time on 29 February 2000. Its members comprised:

- John Monks (Chair)
- Alan Donnelly (Secretary)
- Hazel Blears MP
- Lord Simon of Highbury
- Lord Fyfe of Fairfield
- Gerard Hill
- Mervyn Pedelty
- David Pitt-Watson
- Bill Connor
- Bob Burlton
- Pauline Green
- Alan Middleton

=== Work ===
In its first meeting, the Co-operative Commission formally adopted the terms of reference set for it in the Movement leaders' original letter. These included aims to enable the Co-operative Movement to show that it could survive in the modern marketplace whilst still delivering on its social goals, and for the larger retail societies to help smaller co-operatives in other sectors to grow and thrive. Also included was the importance of ensuring that co-operatives could strongly resist any threat of demutualisation and prevent "the liquidation of assets built up by prior generations of co-operators".

The Co-operative Commission logo

Early in the commission's history, rumours began to spread that it was in fact a "quasi-government" inquiry into the funding relationship between the Co-operative Movement and the Labour Party, through individual co-operatives' donations to some Labour and Co-operative Party MPs. Commission member Pauline Green dismissed the suggestion as "nonsense", and the final report has only one recommendation relating to the Co-operative Party: recommendation 47 calls for the Party and the Labour Party to continue to work closely to increase "participation and political activity". The commission also received criticism from ex-CRS director Barbara Rogers, who accused it of not consulting the Co-operative Union (despite the Union's Chief Executive being one of the commissioners) and of being hijacked by CWS to further its "agenda to mop up surrounding independent societies". Supporters of the CWS' Chief Executive dismissed the claims as "ludicrous".

The commission's original terms of reference were divided into three key questions:

1. What is the vision of the Co-operative Movement as we enter the new century – in terms of commercial objectives and social goals?
2. How close to delivering the vision are we?
3. What structures do we need to close the gap between the vision and the reality?

The commission worked for six months to try to answer these three questions, receiving submissions from experts and interested parties, and holding regional hearings at the Co-operative Congress in May 2000 and at the October 2000 Labour Party Conference. They also received a number of collective and individual submissions, and engaged in debate in the pages of Co-operative News. Technical reports and advice were commissioned from independent advisers and consultants, and many co-operative societies also provided the commission with research and statistics that they had compiled themselves.

Writing in the New Statesman, John Monks said:

Over the past six months, as chair of the Co-operative Commission, I have been hearing evidence from organisations and individuals with a wide range of views on the direction that the movement should take. My colleagues and I have been impressed by many things: first and foremost, the goodwill towards the co-operative movement that is to be found in many, many places. There is also a willingness to embrace change and an awareness that no change is not an option.

The commission met formally on nine occasions, and the final three were dedicated to drawing conclusions from all the submissions, debates and findings to decide what changes the Movement would need to make. A series of recommendations was carefully drawn up, with the commissioners being aware that they needed to be "radical, but deliverable" if they were to have any success in the real world. The chair of the commission maintained hope, writing "In Britain, the co-operative movement is widely seen as dated and out of touch. But the principles it embraces are in tune with modern thinking; the democratisation of communications offered by the internet and other technological developments could yet herald another golden age for co-operation". The final recommendations were published in the commission's final report.

=== Final report ===
The commission's final report, the co-operative advantage: Creating a successful family of Co-operative businesses was published in January 2001. The report contained sixty recommendations for ways in which the Movement could improve and survive into the new century, covering topics as diverse as the creation of a single brand for the consumer co-operative societies to securing co-operatives' assets for future generations of their members. The report was formally presented to the Movement at the Co-operative Congress in May 2001.

In writing the report, the commission had been very mindful of the Gaitskell Commission's report, whose recommendations had been widely ignored despite being "right in nearly everything it recommended". However, this time the Movement proved more willing to put into practice the commission's recommendations: at the 2005 Co-operative Congress, it was announced that 43 of the 60 recommendations had already been completed, and that a further 14 were "well on their way to being completed". Following the commission's report, the Co-operative Movement reported a "profound" restructuring of its business, a "large" increase in profitability and a "considerably greater" delivery of social benefit.
