= Naco =

Naco, NACO, or NACo may refer to:

== Organizations ==
- National AIDS Control Organisation, a Government of India "Apex Body" for managing the AIDS epidemic in India by Ministry of Health and Family Welfare.
- National Angel Capital Organization, a Canadian association of angel capital groups
- National Association of Counties, a non-profit liaison between county and federal government
- National Arts Centre Orchestra, an orchestra in Ottawa, Canada

== Places ==
- Naco, Arizona, a small town in south eastern Arizona
- Naco, Sonora, a small town in Mexico
- Naco (Honduras), an archaeological site in Honduras

== Other ==
- Name Authority Cooperative Program (NACO), part of the Program for Cooperative Cataloging by the Library of Congress and some more national libraries
- Netherlands Airport Consultants (NACO), a Dutch airport consultancy firm
- Naco (slang), a pejorative slang term in Mexican Spanish
- "Naco", a person from Nacozari de García, Sonora, Mexico
- "Naco", a fictional product from Kim Possible, a portmanteau of nacho and taco invented by Ron Stoppable
- National Association of Co-operative Officials, a British trade union
- National Commodore of the United States Coast Guard Auxiliary
- NAOS-CONICA, an adaptive optics facility used for Very Large Telescope (VLT)
