= Euro Coop =

European organization for consumer co-operatives

- Formation: 1957
- Headquarters: Brussels
- President: Mathias Fiedler
- Website: www.eurocoop.coop

Euro Coop, established in 1957, is the European Community of Consumer Co-operatives that predominantly operates in the retail sector. It currently represents 20 national members, which collectively oversee 7.000 co-operative enterprises, 94.000 points of sale, and 750.000 employees. Euro Coop has 30 million consumer members and an annual turnover of €72 billion.

Euro Coop was among the first NGOs to be recognized by the European Commission. By registering with the EU transparency register, Euro Coop is committed to transparent engagement with EU policymakers and stakeholders, representing the interests of consumers responsibly and ethically.

The organization focuses on advocacy, promoting consumer co-operative principles and values at the EU level, and representing consumer interests and rights. They also work to strengthen its members' understanding of EU affairs and facilitates co-operation among members.

The primary objective of Euro Coop is to promote the interests of consumer co-operatives at the European Union Institutions and facilitate closer collaboration between national members by exchanging experiences and working on common projects and initiatives. Euro Coop's Secretariat, based in Brussels, oversees its engagement with various platforms within the European Commission, advisory groups, the Food Policy Coalition, and other groups. The Secretariat works to also ensure that the voice of consumer co-operatives is well-represented within the European Parliament through strong collaboration with the European Economic and Social Committee.

From July 2021, Euro Coop is the Vice-Chair of the task force of the EU Code of Conduct on Responsible Food Business and Marketing Practices, which is one of the 27 actions outlined in the EU Farm to Fork Strategy which aims at promoting sustainable food systems by outlining common objectives and actions for businesses in the food industry, retail, food service, and hospitality sectors.

Euro Coop partners with Cooperatives Europe and the International Co-operative Alliance to work towards achieving the United Nations' Sustainable Development Goals.

Euro Coop is also dedicated to advocating for the interests of consumers in the framework of projects funded by the European Union's Horizon 2020 program.
