= George Fyfe =

George Fyfe may refer to:

- Lennox Fyfe, Baron Fyfe of Fairfield (1941–2011), born George Lennox Fyfe
- George Fyfe (barque), one of the ships used by the New Zealand Company
