= Philips High School =

Location
- Higher Lane; Whitefield, Greater Manchester, M45 7PH; England
- 53.546285°N 2.299504°W

Information
- Type: Community school
- Motto: Latin: Sto vt serviam I Stand To Serve
- Established: Stand GS: 1688; Stand GSG: 1937; As Philips HS: 1979
- Local authority: Bury
- Department for Education URN: 151027 Tables
- Ofsted: Reports
- Chairman of Governors: John Mallon
- Headteacher: C W Hibbert
- Staff: 63
- Gender: Co-educational
- Age: 11 to 16
- Enrolment: 869 pupils as of September 2016
- Capacity: 880
- Houses: Clive, Ineson; Keech, Lobjoit; Philips, Ragdale; Sidall.
- Colour
- Publication: Serviam
- Website: philipshigh.co.uk

Philips High School is a community secondary school in Whitefield, Greater Manchester, England.

== History ==
The school's origins lie in the history of Stand Grammar School. The grammar school was founded in 1688 under the will of Henry Siddall and had close connections with the Unitarian Chapel on Ringley Road, Stand, Whitefield. This connection was so strong that, in the 18th century, it was a school of choice in the north-west for parents from dissenting families who did not want to send their children to Anglican schools.

In the early years of the 20th century, the governors ran into financial difficulties. In 1908, the Lancashire Education Committee (LEC) assumed responsibility for its management. The Committee purchased 7 acres (2.8 ha) of land on Church Lane, Whitefield, from the Earl of Derby and built a new school, which was opened on 6 September 1913 by Alderman J. R. Ragdale. Some believe Robert Clive had links with the school in his early years. Accounts suggest that the Old Standians’ Association began attempts to link Clive to the school some time around 1907. Sir Colvin Bayley (the grandson of Clive’s uncle) stated at a school event that he had been informed Clive had attended the school, prior to living in Hope Hall in Eccles. However, this link has been queried, as even as Bayley admitted, there is no mention of it in any records. Despite this, the Old Standians' Association erected a bronze statue and named one of the school's houses in his honour in 1913.

As a condition of the takeover by the LEC, the school began to admit girls but, in 1937, a separate school—Stand Grammar School for Girls—was opened on Higher Lane, with Grace Lobjoit as the first headmistress. The town of Whitefield became part of the new Metropolitan Borough of Bury on 1 April 1974. Both the boys' and the girls' schools flourished until 1979, when the borough council decided to adopt the comprehensive education system. The boys' and girls' schools were merged as Philips High School, a co-educational comprehensive school, on the Higher Lane site. The former boys' school building on Church Lane became a sixth form college, which in turn was later absorbed into Bury College. The Church Lane buildings were demolished in 2001.

== Campus ==
The school sits on an 8 hectares (19.8 acres) campus in a suburban residential area, adjoining the grounds of the local golf club and close to Philips Park, Prestwich. The site includes c.4.27 hectares (10.55 acres) of playing fields. In addition to the 1937 main building, there is a sports hall, which is also open to the public after school hours. The sports centre has been refurbished, including updating of the gymnasium, and there are three all-weather pitches. In the summer of 2010, a new development in the centre of the building, Lobjoit Court, provided additional ICT facilities; there are now over 400 networked computers in the school. The school hall is equipped with a stage and lighting desk.

== Curriculum ==
Philips High School is a ”maths and computing college”. Pupils study a core curriculum of English, mathematics, ICT and the sciences. General science is the norm in Key Stage 3, whilst pupils in Key Stage 4 may study three separate disciplines; biology, chemistry and physics. In addition, pupils study at least one MFL (French) and a range of subjects including geography, history, RS, music, art, PE and DT.

Pupils in Year 11 are entered for a range of GCSE examinations and BTEC courses. The latter includes a small number of students who attend courses at Bury College in hairdressing and engineering.

== Extra curricular ==
=== Sport ===
Pupils participate in both interhouse competitions and extramural fixtures, and the school participates in Bury Schools’ Sports Association. Sports available both as part of the curriculum and as extra curricular activities include Association football, basketball, Rugby football, hockey, netball and cross country running. In the summer term, there are boys and girls track and field athletics meetings, cricket and rounders matches, as well as badminton, gymnastics and dance.

=== Arts ===
Non-sporting activities include art, maths, key board, Minecraft, philosophy, programming and robotics clubs. The school has a variety of musical groups, including a rock band, and a choir.

== Notable former pupils ==
=== Stand Grammar School ===
- Samuel Bourn (1714—1796); dissenting minister of Rivington and notable preacher.
- John Seddon (1719–1769); dissenting minister at Cross Street Chapel, Manchester and religious controversialist.
- Sir George Philips Bt MP (1766—1847); Industrialist and politician; related to the Philips family, after whom the school is named.
- John Edward Taylor (1791–1844); journalist and newspaper editor; founder of The Manchester Guardian
- Sir Joseph Latham CBE; deputy chairman of the NCB
- Sir Robert Southern (1907-1999), general secretary of the Co-operative Union, 1950-1992
- Professor Geoffrey Bullough (1901—1982); professor of English

=== Stand Grammar School for Boys ===
- John Spencer (1935–2006); professional snooker player who won the World Professional title at his first attempt and was the first winner at the Crucible Theatre, the inaugural winner of the Masters and Irish Masters, and the first player to make a 147 break in competition.
- Norman McVicker (1940-2008), first-class cricketer
- Howard Jacobson (born 1942); novelist and Booker Prize winner
- Mark E. Smith (1957–2018); musician; lead singer of the Fall
- Jack Howland CBE; honoured for contributions to the IT industry

=== Philips High School ===
- Jon Ashworth (born 1978); Labour MP for Leicester South
- Robert Largan (born 1987); Conservative MP for High Peak
- Jamie Lomas (born 1975); actor, best known for his role as Warren Fox in the Channel 4 soap Hollyoaks
- Bugzy Malone (born 1990); Grime Artist, MC/Rapper
- Charley Webb (born 1988); actress; plays the role of Debbie Dingle in the ITV soap Emmerdale
- Isobel Steele (born 2000); actress; plays the role of Liv Flaherty in the ITV soap Emmerdale
