= Alfred Whitehead (co-operator) =

British co-operator (1862–1945)

- Born: 14 January 1862; Newton Heath, Manchester, England
- Died: 21 February 1945 (aged 83)
- Organization: Co-operative Union
- Movement: Co-operative

Alfred Whitehead (14 January 1862 – 21 February 1945) was a British co-operative activist.

Born in the Newton Heath area of Manchester, Whitehead left school at the age of ten to work in a textile factory. He became interested in the co-operative movement, and in 1886 became a clerk for the Co-operative Union. He was promoted to become its north-western secretary, then in 1895 became the organisation's assistant secretary. He succeeded as secretary of the union in 1912, serving until 1929.

Whitehead also served on the executive of the International Co-operative Alliance from 1910, and as its vice-president from 1921. He was the president of the Co-operative Congress in 1928.

In his spare time, Whitehead taught in a Sunday school, was active in the temperance movement, and joined the Union of Democratic Control.

Non-profit organization positions
Preceded by Jesse Clement Gray	General Secretary of the Co-operative Union; 1911–1929	Succeeded by Robert Palmer
