= Ed Mayo =

British economist (born 1964)

Ed Mayo MBE
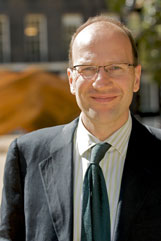
- Ed Mayo, former Secretary General of Co-operatives UK

Secretary General of Co-operatives UK
- In office 2 November 2009 – March 2020
- Preceded by: Dame Pauline Green (Chief executive)
- Succeeded by: Rose Marley (Chief executive)

Chief executive of Consumer Focus
- In office 2008 – 2 November 2009

Chief executive of National Consumer Council
- In office 2003–2008
- Succeeded by: Organisation became Consumer Focus

Director of New Economics Foundation
- In office 1992–2003

Personal details
- Born: 14 April 1964 (age 62)
- Education: City University Business School

Ed Mayo MBE (born 14 April 1964), is the CEO of the London-based charity Pilotlight. He is the former Secretary General of Co-operatives UK, the UK trade association for co-operatives and former chief executive of the British National Consumer Council (NCC) and CEO of the NCC's successor, Consumer Focus.

== Education ==
Mayo was educated at Downing College, Cambridge – reading philosophy – and City University Business School. He was awarded an honorary doctorate by the London Metropolitan University in 2007.

== Career ==
After a short period as a management consultant at Andersen Consulting, Mayo joined the World Development Movement, serving as acting director until 1992.

Mayo rose to prominence as director of the New Economics Foundation (NEF) from 1992 to 2003. He led NEF from two to fifty staff, creating the leading 'think-and-do tank', looking at ethical market activity, local economies and public service reform. NHS Foundation Trusts were an idea partly inspired by NEF and Mayo, particularly his October 2001 pamphlet, The Mutual State, published with Mutuo, a think tank set up by the Co-operative Party. NEF also co-ordinated the Jubilee 2000 campaign during this time, for which Mayo was the strategist. It gained 24 million signatures for the worldwide petition on development and poverty.

In 2003, he left to become chief executive of the National Consumer Council, staying with the organisation for 5 years. In 2008, the National Consumer Council merged with energywatch and Postwatch to form Consumer Focus, a move which Mayo oversaw as he became chief executive of the new organisation. In July 2009, he announced that he would be resigning to take up the position of Secretary General of Co-operatives UK following the retirement of its chief executive, Dame Pauline Green. He took up the position officially the following November.

== Other activities ==
Mayo has also been involved in other regeneration, development and community projects. He has been on the board of AccountAbility, War on Want, the Fairtrade Foundation, the Local Investment Fund, Social Investment Forum and www.oneworld.net, a popular portal on human rights, development and environment. He has advised HM Treasury on enterprise and led the development of the new Community Investment Tax Credit introduced by Gordon Brown.

He is also an honorary vice-president of the National Federation of Enterprise Agencies. He was the founding chair of the London Rebuilding Society and is involved in his local community as a trustee of the MERRY charity, linking up communities in Deptford and Mozambique through music and culture. In the field of economics, Mayo is a fellow of the World Economic Forum and addressed the annual summit in Davos from 2000 to 2003 on issues of economic change and social inclusion.

In June 2003, Mayo joined the NCC. That year The Guardian nominated him as one of the top 100 most influential figures in British social policy and in November 2004 commented that 'from cancelling third world debt to justice for working-class consumers, Ed Mayo is a key figure in social innovation. He was nominated a 'Young Global Leader' by the World Economic Forum in January 2005.

The Power of Information: An Independent Review by Mayo and Tom Steinberg was published in 2007; as was the official government response to it.

Mayo is married with three children and lives in south London. He was appointed Member of the Order of the British Empire (MBE) in the 2026 New Year Honours for charitable service.

== Publications ==
- Poverty, social exclusion and microfinance in the UK with Rogaly and Fisher, Oxfam Books 1999
- Brave new economy (CD-ROM), NEF 2000
- Banking and social cohesion with Christophe Guene, 2001
- The Mutual State, Mutuo October 2001
- Building the mutual state, ed. with Henrietta Moore, Mutuo 2002
- The organics tax credit, NEF 2002
- 'Life saving: Community Development Credit Unions with Mick Brown and Pat Conaty, NEF, the National Association of Credit Workers and NCC
- Steinberg, Tom; Mayo, Ed (2007). "The Power of Information: An Independent Review". Archived from the original on 4 March 2010.
- Mayo, Ed; Nairn, Agnes (2009). Consumer kids: how big business is grooming our children for profit. London: Constable. ISBN 9781845298807.

== See also ==
- Industrial and provident society

Preceded by Pauline Green	Secretary General of Co-operatives UK; 2009–	Succeeded by Incumbent
