= Robert Southern =

British co-operator (1907–1999)

Sir Robert Southern CBE
- Born: 17 March 1907; Prestwich, Lancashire, England
- Died: September 1999 (aged 92)
- Education: Stand Grammar School; Co-operative College; University of Manchester
- Organization: Co-operative Union

Sir Robert Southern CBE (17 March 1907 – September 1999) was a British co-operative official.

Born in Prestwich, Southern was educated at Stand Grammar School. He was interested in the co-operative movement from an early age, joining the Co-operative Wholesale Society (CWS) in 1923. He studied at the Co-operative College, and from 1929 worked for the Co-operative Union. In his spare time, he completed a degree in commerce with the University of Manchester.

In 1946, Southern was appointed as assistant general secretary of the Co-operative Union, and he was promoted to general secretary in 1950. He remained in this post until his retirement, in 1972, also serving as a vice-president of the International Co-operative Alliance and as president of the 1969 Co-operative Congress.

Southern devoted much of his spare time to the Stand Unitarian Chapel, serving as secretary of its trustees, and as superintendent of its Sunday school. He was also secretary of the Besses o' th' Barn Band Company, a brass band, and was active in the Radcliffe Literary Society and Camera Club. He was made a Commander of the Order of the British Empire in 1953, and was knighted in the 1970 New Year Honours.

Non-profit organization positions
Preceded by Robert Palmer	General Secretary of the Co-operative Union; 1950–1972	Succeeded by Clarence Hilditch
