= 2000 Special Honours =

British government recognitions

As part of the British honours system, Special Honours are issued at the Monarch's pleasure at any given time. The Special Honours refer to the awards made within royal prerogative, operational honours and other honours awarded outside the New Years Honours and Birthday Honours.

== Life Peer ==
=== Baronesses ===
- Dr. Kay Andrews, O.B.E., Director, Education Extra.
- Angela Theodora Billingham, J.P., formerly Member (Labour) Northampton and Blaby, European Parliament.
- Janet Cohen, Non-Executive Director and Consultant, Charterhouse Bank Ltd.
- Anne Gibson, O.B.E., former National Secretary, Manufacturing Science and Finance Union.
- Dr. Lindsay Granshaw, Chair, Women’s Liberal Democrats.
- Dame Sheila Masters, D.B.E., Partner, KPMG.
- Rosalind Carol Scott, Group Leader, Suffolk County Council.
- Joan Walmsley, Public Relations Consultant.

=== Barons ===
- Richard Gerald Lyon-Dalberg-Acton, Baron Acton, Bt., Writer.
- Michael Ashcroft, Chairman, Carlisle Holdings Ltd.
- Anthony Fitzhardinge Gueterbock, Baron Berkeley, O.B.E., Chairman, Rail Freight Group; Piggybank Consortium.
- Alexander Bernstein, retired Television Executive and Chairman, Old Vic Theatre Trust.
- Daniel Joseph Brennan, Q.C., Chairman, The Bar Council.
- Thomas Orlando Lyttelton, Viscount Chandos, Chairman, Lopex plc.
- Sebastian Newbold Coe, O.B.E., Private Secretary to the Leader of the Opposition.
- Matthew Evans, C.B.E., Managing Director, Faber & Faber.
- George Lennox Fyfe, Chief Executive, Midlands Co-operative Society Ltd; Chairman, Co-operative Wholesale Society Ltd.
- Anthony Robert Greaves, Former Councillor, Pendle Borough Council.
- Julian Pascoe Francis St. Leger, Baron Grenfell, former Adviser to the World Bank.
- Robin Granville Hodgson, C.B.E., Chairman and Founder, Granville plc.
- Professor Julian Charles Roland Hunt, C.B., F.R.S., Professor of Climate Modelling, Department of Space and Climate Physics and Geological Sciences and Honorary Professor of Mathematics, University College London.
- William Brian Jordan, C.B.E., General Secretary, International Confederation of Free Trade Unions.
- Professor Peter Richard Grenville Layard, Director, Centre for Economic Performance, London School of Economics.
- James Thorne Erskine, The Earl of Mar And Kellie, D.L., former Member of the House of Lords.
- Parry Mitchell, Founder and Chairman, Syscap plc.
- Professor Kenneth Owen Morgan, Research Professor, University College of Swansea.
- Matthew Oakeshott, Director, OLIM Ltd and Warburg Investment Management.
- Professor Bhikhu Chotalal Parekh, Professor of Political Theory, Hull University.
- Frederick Matthew Thomas, Baron Ponsonby Of Shulbrede, former Spokesman on Education, House of Lords; Delegate, Council of Europe and WEU.
- Rupert Bertram Mitford, Baron Redesdale, former Liberal Democrat Spokesman, House of Lords.
- John Francis Hodgess Roper, Visiting Professor, College of Europe, Bruges.
- David Trevor Shutt, O.B.E., Chartered Accountant and Group Leader, Calderdale MBC.
- Sir Leslie Arnold Turnberg, President, British Society of Gastroenterology.
