= Robert Palmer, 1st Baron Rusholme =

The Right Honourable The Lord Rusholme

General Secretary of the Co-operative Union
- In office 1929–1947
- Preceded by: Alfred Whitehead
- Succeeded by: Robert Southern

Robert Alexander Palmer, 1st Baron Rusholme (29 November 1890 – 18 August 1977) was a senior official of the British co-operative movement and a Labour Co-operative member of the House of Lords.

== Career ==
Born in November 1890, Palmer left school at the age of 14. By the age of 21 he was a director of the Manchester and Salford Co-operative Society, the largest consumer co-operative in Manchester. During the First World War he served with the Manchester Regiment (Territorial Force) in Egypt, Belgium and France, and was commissioned as a second lieutenant on 30 October 1918. At the age of 30, Palmer was appointed Cashier and Financial Adviser of the Co-operative Union, the trade body of the consumer co-operative movement. In 1929 he became the body's general secretary. He continued in the role until 1947. He also became President of the International Co-operative Alliance.

In 1945 Palmer was raised to the peerage as Baron Rusholme, of Rusholme in the City of Manchester, becoming the first Co-operative peer among the Labour ranks. He joined the British Transport Commission in 1947, serving until 1959, and chaired the London Midland Area Board of British Railways from 1955 to 1960.

== Personal life ==
Lord Rusholme died in August 1977, aged 86, when the barony became extinct.

Non-profit organization positions
Preceded by Alfred Whitehead	General Secretary of the Co-operative Union; 1929–1947	Succeeded by Robert Southern
Preceded by Väinö Tanner	President of the International Co-operative Alliance; 1946 – 1948	Succeeded by Harry Gill
Peerage of the United Kingdom
New creation	Baron Rusholme; 1945 – 1977	Extinct
