= Margaret Digby =

British writer

Margaret Digby CBE
- Born: 9 March 1902
- Died: 6 January 1985 (aged 82)
- Education: London School of Economics
- Organization: Plunkett Foundation
- Movement: Co-operative

Margaret Digby CBE (9 March 1902 – 6 January 1985) was a British writer on co-operatives.
