= Peter Hunt (politician) =

Peter Hunt is a British politician and co-operative activist and thinker. He was until March 2008 General Secretary of the Co-operative Party and is as of 2008 chief executive of the think tank Mutuo.

Educated at Comprehensive School in Leicester and at Brunel University, Hunt joined the Labour Party in 1983 and worked in housing and IT before joining the Co-operative Party in 1994, working as regional organiser for the South of England. In 1998, Hunt was appointed General Secretary of the Party.

The Co-operative Party had arguably been in a long decline and Hunt's immediate priority was to secure the position and finances of the Party and its relationship with the new Labour government. He also rejuvenated the Party's policy making and broadened its scope. He relaunched the Party's magazine, New Mutualism, and started a series of policy pamphlets under the same name. One of these, New Mutualism: A Golden Goal? inspired the creation of Supporters Direct and a new generation of mutual organisations—football supporters' trusts. Another, New Mutualism: The Third Way (1998) by Peter Kellner, was a key piece of thinking in the early 'Third Way' phase of New Labour.

Hunt launched Mutuo in 2000 as a think tank for the wider mutual sector, attracting support from building societies, friendly societies and mutual insurers. Mutuo took on much of the policy publishing, with many publications by leading thinkers and politicians in the field. Making Healthcare Mutual, co-written by Hunt, Hazel Blears and Cliff Mills, called for a locally accountable NHS and underpinned the only successful amendment to the Act on foundation hospitals.

As general secretary, Hunt sat on the National Policy Forum of the Labour Party. In early 2008, Hunt announced he would be stepping down as general secretary of the Co-operative Party in March 2008.

On 19 February 2019 Hunt announced his resignation from the Labour Party with a letter to The Guardian, denouncing an hostile environment inside the party and claiming that Jeremy Corbyn did not represent his political values. He remained a member of the Co-operative Party.

== Books ==
- Making Healthcare Mutual - a publicly funded, locally accountable NHS, by Hazel Blears, Cliff Mills and Peter Hunt (Mutuo, 2002)
- Back Home: Returning football clubs to their communities, by Christine Oughton, Cobbetts Solicitors, Malcolm McClean of Community Action Network and Peter Hunt (Mutuo, 2003)
- Care on Call – a mutual approach to out of hours primary care services, by Peter Hunt, Cliff Mills of Cobbetts Solicitors and John Hutton (Mutuo, 2004)
- The People's Rail: A Mutually Run, Publicly Accountable Network Rail, by Robbie Erbmann and Peter Hunt (The Co-operative Party, 2008) ISBN 978-0-9559737-0-3
