= National Association of Co-operative Officials =

NACO
- National Association of Co-operative Officials
- Merged into: Union of Shop, Distributive and Allied Workers
- Founded: 1917
- Dissolved: 1 May 2018
- Headquarters: 6a Clarendon Place, Hyde, Greater Manchester, England
- Location: United Kingdom
- Members: 2,500
- Key people: Bob Lister, Interim General Secretary
- Publication: The Co-operative Official
- Affiliations: TUC, STUC

The National Association of Co-operative Officials (NACO) was a trade union for staff in the co-operative sector in the United Kingdom, principally the Co-operative Group and other retail societies, Co-operatives UK and the Co-operative Party.

== History ==
The union was founded in 1917, as the National Union of Co-operative Officials. In 1970, it merged with the National Co-operative Managers Association, and with the Co-operative Secretaries Association, adopting its current name.

NACO historically represented professionals and management in the sector, with general unions, principally the Union of Shop, Distributive and Allied Workers (USDAW), recruiting among shop-floor and administrative workers. In the 2010s, NACO began, with the support of Co-operatives UK, to widen its base and end the division between 'officials' and 'administrators'. By 2017, it represented managers at the Co-operative Group, Central England Co-operative, Channel Islands Co-operative, Chelmsford Star Co-operative, East of England Co-operative, Heart of England Co-operative, Lincolnshire Co-operative, Midcounties Co-operative, Scotmid and Southern Co-operative.

By 2017, membership of the union had fallen, leaving it concerned about its ability to continue as an independent organisation. As a result, it entered into discussions with USDAW about merging into that union's Supervisory, Administrative and Technical Association. In February 2018, 82% of NACO members voted for the merger, which was completed in May.

== General Secretaries ==
1917: E. Emery
1920s: Robert Simpson
1942: Robert Calderwood
1952: Arthur Potts
1977: Lindsay Ewing
2006: Neil Buist
2015: Bob Lister (interim)
