= Jesse Clement Gray =

British co-operator (1854–1912)

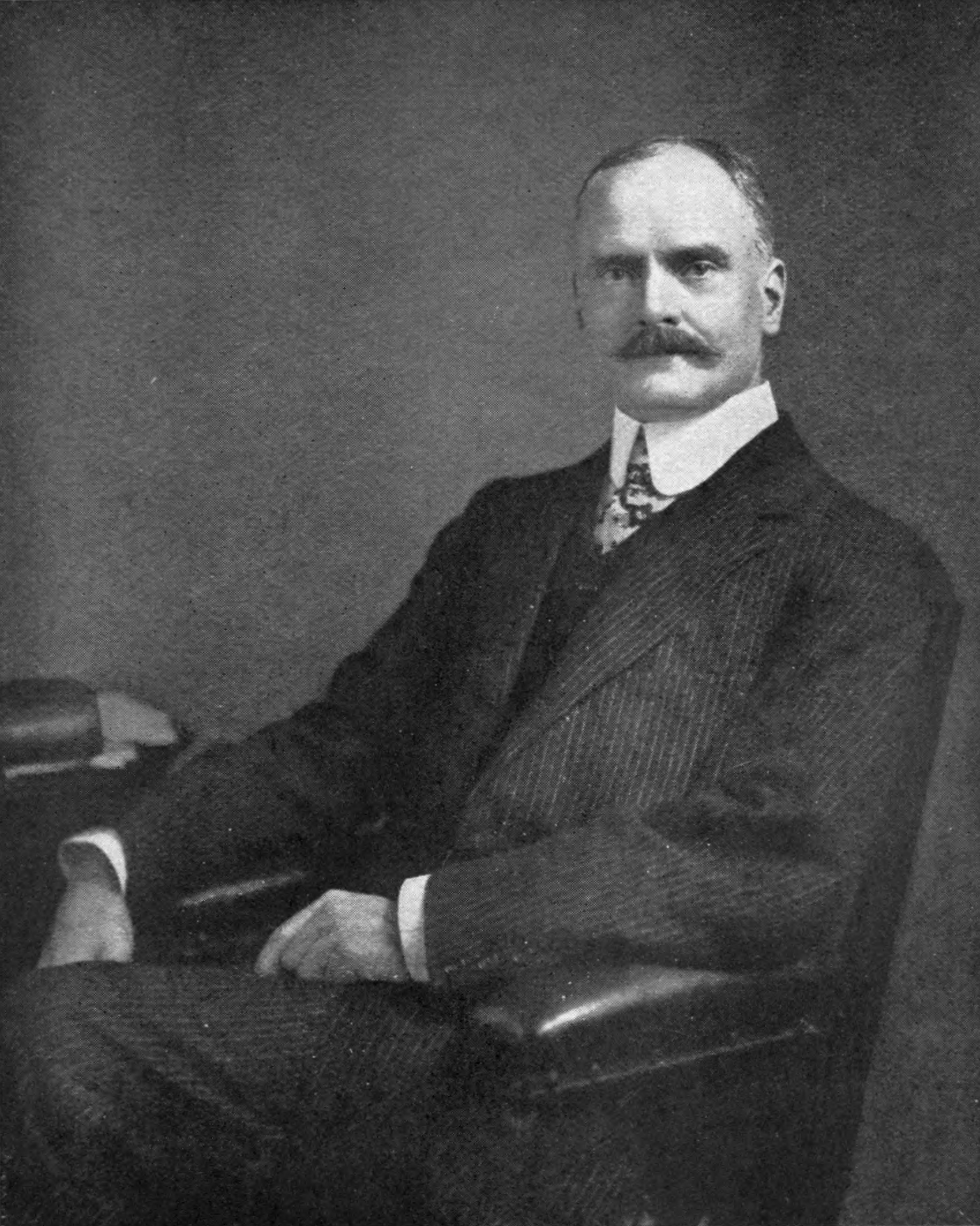
- Born: 12 July 1854; Ripley, Derbyshire, England
- Died: 24 February 1912 (aged 57); Manchester, England
- Movement: Co-operative movement

Jesse Clement Gray (12 July 1854 – 24 February 1912) was a British co-operative activist.

== Biography ==
Gray was born on 12 July 1854, in Ripley, Derbyshire, the son of a Baptist minister. In 1860, his family moved to Hebden Bridge, and Gray was educated at the town's grammar school.

Gray left school at the age of thirteen and worked as a clerk for the Lancashire and Yorkshire Railway. He was interested in the co-operative movement, and so in 1874, became the assistant secretary of the Hebden Bridge Fustian Society, a full-time post. He proved successful in the role, and was promoted to become the organisation's general secretary before he had even spent six months in the post.

Gray began making a national reputation for himself, championing co-operative production methods, in addition to the co-operative retail which was becoming widespread. In 1883, he was appointed as assistant secretary of the Co-operative Union, and was promoted to become its secretary in 1891. He also became secretary of the International Co-operative Alliance, serving from 1902 until 1908.

In 1906, Gray proposed that the various retail co-operatives in the United Kingdom combine and be ran by an elected general council of 150 members; this proposal was not accepted. He retired in 1910, due to failing health, and died on 24 February 1912, aged 57, in Manchester. He is buried in Hebden Bridge, with a monument in the graveyard funded by the movement.

Non-profit organization positions
Preceded by Edward Vansittart Neale	General Secretary of the Co-operative Union; 1891–1910	Succeeded by Alfred Whitehead
Preceded by Edward Owen Greening	Secretary of the International Co-operative Alliance; 1902–1908	Succeeded by Hans Müller
