= Plunkett UK =

UK charitable organization

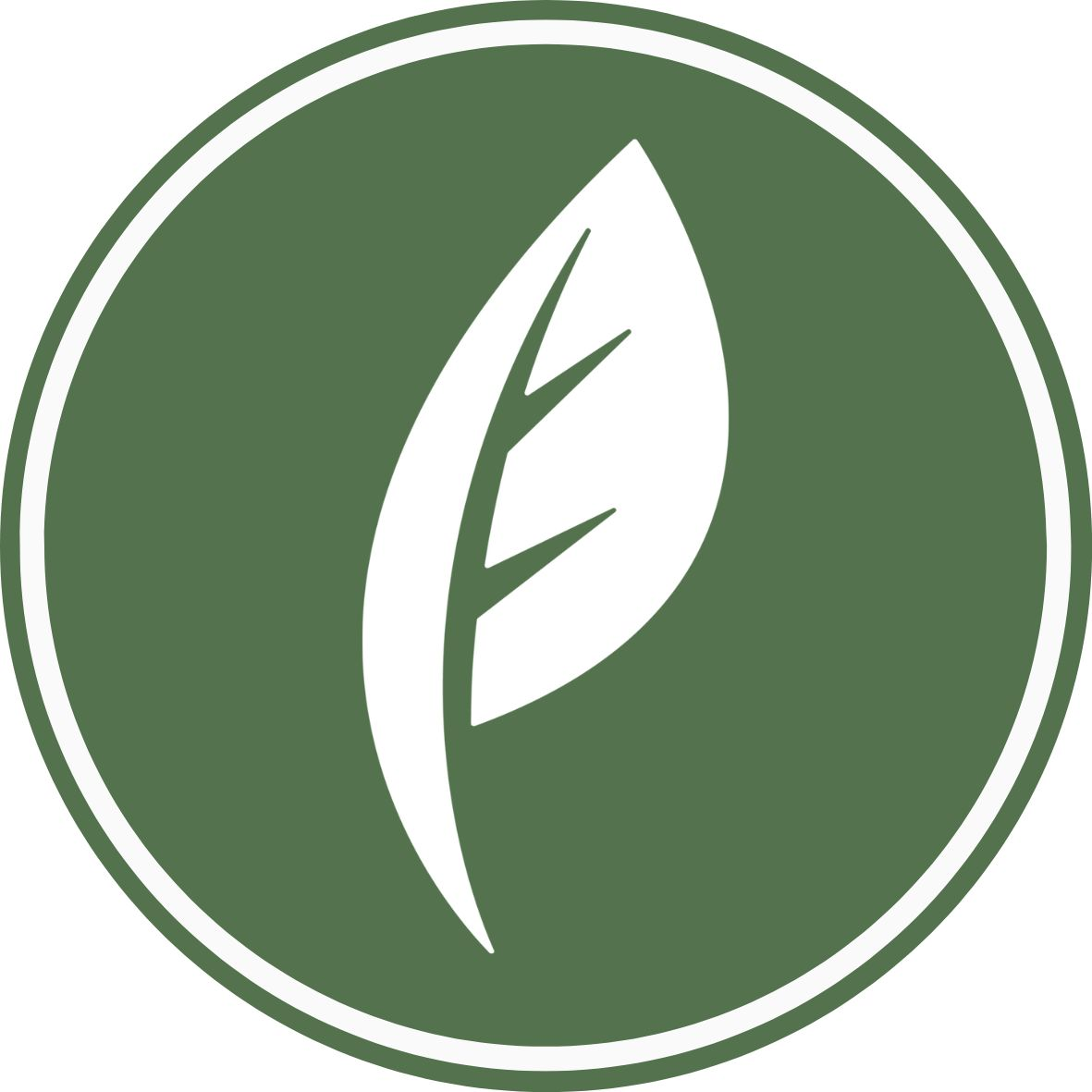
- Named after: Horace Plunkett
- Formation: 17 January 1919; 107 years ago
- Founder: Horace Plunkett
- Founded at: Dublin, Ireland
- Type: Charitable foundation
- Purpose: Support rural community-owned businesses
- Headquarters: Woodstock, Oxfordshire, England
- CEO: James Alcock
- Chair: Stephen Nicol
- Website: plunkett.co.uk

Plunkett UK (formerly Plunkett Foundation) is a charity in the United Kingdom that aims to help rural communities create and run democratic community-owned businesses, such as shops, cafes, and farms. The charity strives for resilient and inclusive rural communities, and has promoted the community ownership model for over 100 years.

== Background ==
Plunkett Foundation was founded in 1919 by a pioneer of rural co-operation in Ireland, Sir Horace Plunkett. Since being founded, it has been involved in a range of work relating to international development, rural development and agricultural development. The foundation is based in Woodstock, Oxfordshire, England. In 2024, Plunkett Foundation changed its name to Plunkett UK to reflect its UK-oriented operations, although it is still registered as its former name.

The foundation works with the International Co-operative Alliance, Cooperatives UK, Cooperatives Europe and the International Co-operative Agricultural Organisation.

== Work ==
In 2007, the charity led the work of the Making Local Food Work programme which supported community food enterprises in England. Other projects include More Than a Pub and Rural Community Shops.

To celebrate being designated as the United Nations International Year of Co-operatives in 2012, Plunkett Foundation held the World of Rural Co-operation International Roundtable event at Dunsany Castle. This event led to the development of the Dunsany Declaration for Rural Co-operative Development, which fed into the Blueprint for a Co-operative Decade.

In 2021, the foundation supported 400 communities. In 2022, it reported an income of £1,052,262.

== See also ==
- Malcolm Lyall Darling
