= Deal flow =

Term used by finance professionals

Deal flow is a term used by finance professionals such as venture capitalists, angel investors, private equity investors and investment bankers to refer to the rate at which they receive business proposals/investment offers. The term is also used not as a measure of rate, but simply to refer to the stream of offers or opportunities as a collective whole. An organization's deal flow is considered "good" if it results in enough revenue- or equity-generating opportunities to keep the organization functioning at peak capacity. For private consultants to high and ultra high net worth individuals, deal flow is called deal generation, which is the process of making deals with a business as a result of lead generation.

== In venture capital ==
The most famous and successful venture capital firms regularly receive hundreds of business plans each month. VC firms typically fund only 0.25% to 0.5%. Firms will typically institute a unique approach to selecting startups to fund. Active angel investment groups typically receive dozens of plans each month, but because of the much smaller number of plans compared to VCs, they tend to fund a higher percentage (0.5% to 1.0%). Once a company passes the group's screening process and is invited to present to the group's full membership, its chances of getting funded rise to about 18%, according to the University of New Hampshire's Center for Venture Research.

== Sources of deal flow ==
A fund's or group's deal flow is generated from many sources. The most valuable referrals often come from entrepreneurs or companies in which the fund has previously invested; from other funds looking to syndicate a deal; and from professionals (such as attorneys and accountants) who are familiar with the fund's investment criteria. Other sources of deal flow are investment bankers and "finders", who expect to receive a fee (from either the company or the investor) for making the introduction.

Many funds and groups (but not all) will also accept business plans "over the transom", that is, as an unreferred submission from a company with no previous relationship with the funding organization. In practice, such unreferred plans are usually much less likely to receive funding.

To create and maintain sufficient deal flow, venture capitalists and angels spend much of their time doing business development, raising their profiles by giving speeches, writing blogs, and networking with others who also work with early-stage companies. VCs and angels regularly attend conferences and "venture fairs" where multiple companies pitch their businesses to investors.

== See also ==
- Venture capital
- History of private equity and venture capital
