= Glyn Ford =

British academic and politician (born 1950)

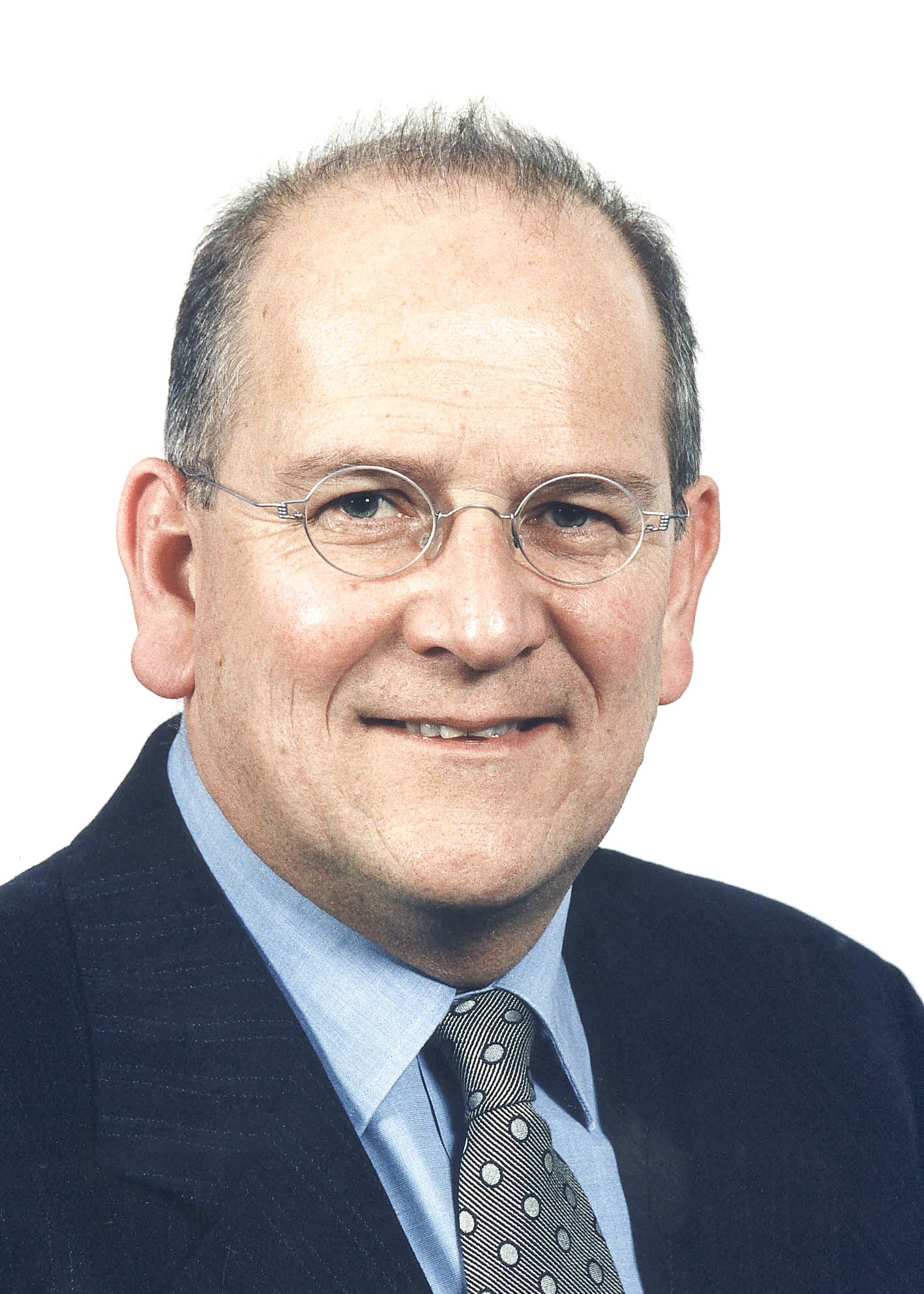
- Ford in 1994

Member of the European Parliament
- In office 14 June 1984 – 14 July 2009
- Preceded by: Constituency established (1984, 1999)
- Succeeded by: Constituency abolished (1999, 2009)
- Constituency: Greater Manchester East (1984–1999); South West England (1999–2009)

Leader of the European Parliamentary Labour Party
- In office 1989–1993

Member of Tameside Borough Council
- In office ?–?

Personal details
- Born: 28 January 1950 (age 76) Gloucester, England, United Kingdom
- Party: Labour; Gibraltar Socialist Labour Party
- Education: University of Reading; University College London
- Profession: Academic
- Website: glynford.org (Archived 4 May 2014) glynnford.eu

Glyn Ford (born 28 January 1950) is a British academic and Labour Party politician. He was a Member of the European Parliament (MEP) from 1984 to 2009, initially for Greater Manchester East until 1999, then South West England from 1999 to 2009.

== Early life and education ==
Ford was born in Gloucester. He went to Marling School, Stroud. After a year as an apprentice at the British Aircraft Corporation he returned to education gaining a degree in Geology from the University of Reading in 1972, then a master's degree in marine Earth science from University College London in 1974.

== Academic career ==
For most of his academic career Ford worked at the University of Manchester, as a research fellow (1976–1979), a lecturer (1979–1980), and finally as a senior research fellow in the Department of Science and Technology Policy (1980–1984).

He also taught for the Open University (1976–1978) and UMIST (1977–1978). He was a research fellow at the University of Sussex (1978–1979). In 1983, he spent six months as a visiting professor at Tokyo University.

After becoming a member of the European Parliament in 1984, the University of Manchester made him an honorary visiting research fellow.

== Political career ==
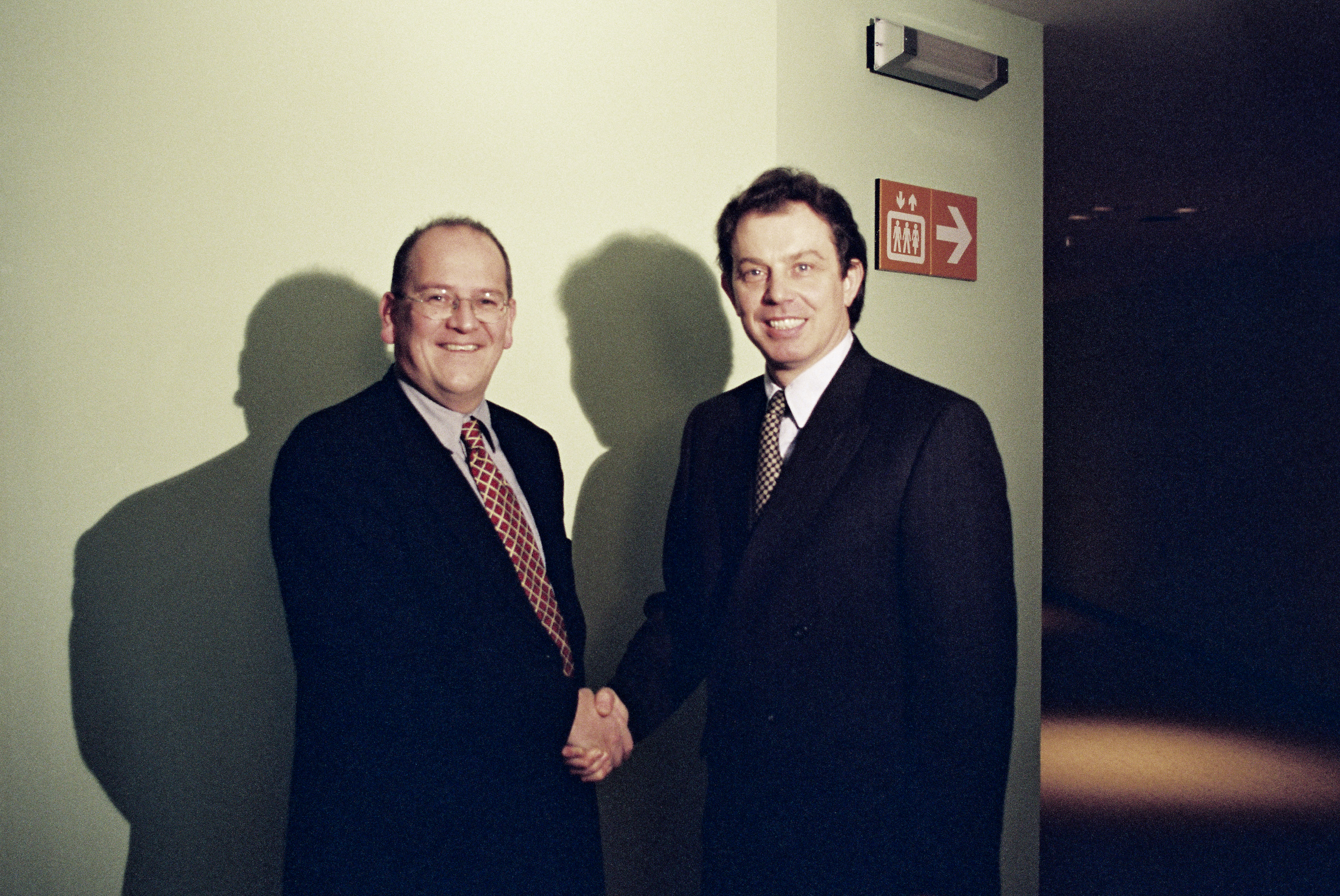
Ford with Tony Blair in 1995

While working at the university, he was a local councillor in the Greater Manchester borough of Tameside, where he was the Chair of the Environmental Health and Education Committees.

On 14 June 1984 Ford was elected as a member of the European Parliament for the new constituency of Greater Manchester East. He held this seat for three terms, until the constituency was abolished in 1999, being re-elected on 15 June 1989 and 9 June 1994.

In 1987 he stood as the Labour candidate for the Hazel Grove constituency in Greater Manchester in the 1987 general election, a seat where Labour had no likelihood of winning.

From 1989 to 1993 Ford was Leader of the European Parliamentary Labour Party and Deputy Chair of the European Parliament Socialist Group. Consequently he was also a member of Labour's National Executive Committee.

On 10 June 1999 Ford was elected as a member of the European Parliament for the constituency of South West England for both the Labour Party and the Gibraltar Socialist Labour Party. Gibraltar was part of the South West England European Parliament constituency. Ford campaigned for Gibraltar to have its own seat in the European Parliament, rather than only having representation through the South West England constituency.

Ford held this seat for two terms, being re-elected on 10 June 2004. He lost his seat in the elections on 4 June 2009. The Labour Party gained 118,716 votes (7.61%) in the South West region in 2009, which was insufficient to win a seat in the multi-member constituency which had had its representation reduced from seven to six at that election.

Ford's three main areas of interest are Research and Development, Racism and East Asia. Ford was for fifteen years a member of the European Parliament's Research Committee, the Guest Editor of the Science and Public Policy Special Issue on Science and Technology in Europe and the author, with Chris Niblett and Lindsay Walker, of The Future for Ocean Technology (Frances Pinter, 1987).

Ford was Chair of the European Parliament's Committee of Inquiry into The Growth of Racism and Fascism in Europe (1984–86) and rapporteur for a second European Parliament Committee of Inquiry into Racism and Xenophobia. He served as the European Parliament's representative on the Council of Ministers Consultative Commission on Racism and Xenophobia (1994–99). He was National Treasurer of the Anti-Nazi League and author of Fascist Europe (Pluto, 1992).

In 1996 he published with Glenys Kinnock and Arlene McCarthy Changing States: A Labour Agenda for Europe (Mandarin, 1996).

He served throughout his time in the European Parliament as a member of the Japan Delegation and as a member of the Korean Peninsula Delegation from its formation in 2004. In these roles he visited North Korea almost 50 times. He was the EU's Chief Election Observer in Indonesia in 2004 and in Aceh 2006–7. In 2008, he published, North Korea on the Brink: Struggle for Survival (Pluto) which has been subsequently been published in Japanese and Korean. He wrote for The Japan Times.

After leaving the European Parliament, Ford founded the Public Affairs and International Relations consultancy Polint.

Ford stood in the 2014 European Parliament election, but his second position on the Labour South West England list did not yield a seat. Ford is a member of the Labour Party National Policy Forum, and was re-elected in 2015.

Since 2014 Ford has been Director of the Brussels-based NGO Track2Asia. In 2014, he was a regular contributor to Tribune. As of 2020, Ford writes on international matters for Chartist, NK News and 38 North.

== Bibliography ==
- Glyn Ford; Chris A Niblett; Lindsay Walker (1981). Ocean thermal energy : prospects and opportunities. Manchester University. OCLC 12472220.
- Glyn Ford; Chris A Niblett; Lindsay Walker (1987). The Future for Ocean Technology (The Future for Science and Technology Series). Continuum International Publishing. ISBN 978-0861875221.
- Glyn Ford (1992). Fascist Europe : the rise of racism and xenophobia. Pluto Press. ISBN 978-0745306681.
- Glyn Ford (2002). Making European progress. Watase Publications. OCLC 124024853.
- Glyn Ford; Soyoung Kwon (2007). North Korea on the Brink: Struggle For Survival. Pluto Press. ISBN 978-0745325996.
- Glyn Ford (2018). Talking to North Korea: ending the nuclear standoff. Pluto Press. ISBN 978-0745337852.

Party political offices
Preceded by Barry Seal	Leader of the European Parliamentary Labour Party; 1989–1993	Succeeded by Pauline Green
