= Co-operatives UK =

Central membership body for UK co-operatives

Co-operatives UK Limited
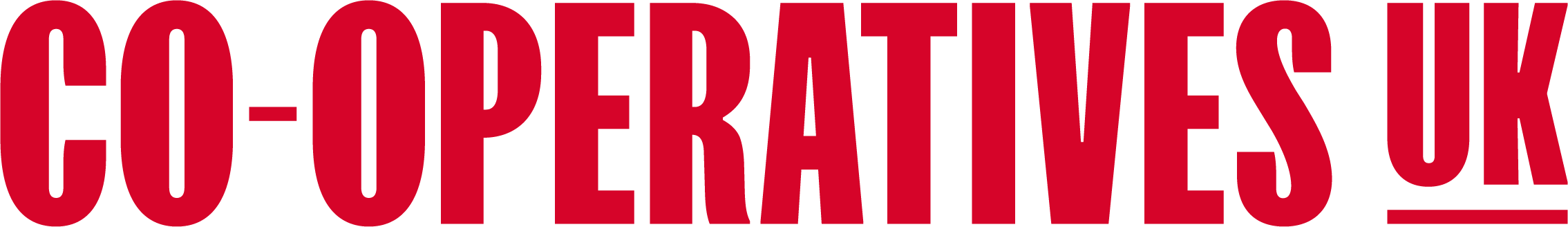

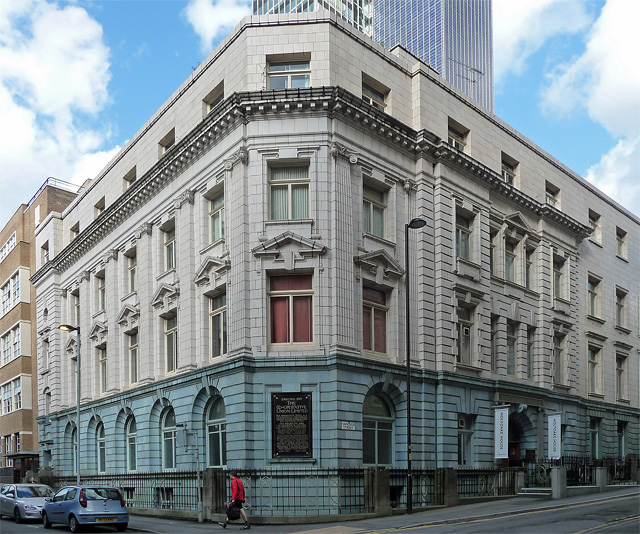
- Holyoake House in Manchester, the headquarters of Co-operatives UK
- Formerly: Co-operative Central Board; Co-operative Union; Industrial Common Ownership Movement (ICOM)
- Type: Co-operative Federation
- Industry: Trade association
- Founded: Manchester (1889)
- Headquarters: Holyoake House, Hanover Street, Manchester
- Area served: United Kingdom
- Key people: Rose Marley (CEO)
- Members: 1,000+
- Website: www.uk.coop

Co-operatives UK is a British co-operative federation. It was founded in 1870 as the Co-operative Central Board, changing its name to the Co-operative Union before finally becoming Co-operatives UK following its merger with the Industrial Common Ownership Movement (ICOM) in 2001. Historically associated with consumer co-operatives, the merger broadened its scope to include worker co-operatives and it now exists to support and promote the values of the entire co-operative movement throughout the UK.

During its history it has been responsible for the organisation of the Co-operative Congresses, the establishment of both Co-operative Commissions and the creation of the Co-operative College and the Co-operative Party. The head office, Holyoake House in Manchester, is a Grade II listed building, and was built in 1911 in memory of the co-operative activist George Jacob Holyoake.

Membership of Co-operatives UK includes organisations as diverse as the Woodcraft Folk, Suma Wholefoods and the Co-operative Group. It is controlled by a board elected by its membership and is a member of the International Co-operative Alliance (ICA). It is the trustee of the Co-operative College, and retains a nominated seat on the National Executive Committee of the Co-operative Party.

== Modern organisation ==
The modern organisation began to take shape when Dame Pauline Green became the first female chief executive of the Co-operative Union on New Year's Day 2000. Her first action in the position was to write a letter – co-signed by Lord Graham of Edmonton, Graham Melmoth, and Len Fyfe – to then Prime Minister Tony Blair for his help in creating a second Co-operative Commission, to help revitalise the movement for the next century. Green served on the commission, chaired by John Monks, and then took the job of coordinating the union's response to the final report. The union began a "deliberate attempt to secure and celebrate [the] co-operative advantage", forming closer ties with other organisations across the movement in an attempt to create the "first ever 'all movement' Co-ordination Movement".

The fruit of these closer ties was an increased visibility and role for the union across the co-operative movement. The union began providing administration services for the United Kingdom Co-operative Council (UKCC) and the Industrial Common Ownership Movement (ICOM) in 2000. This ultimately led to the UKCC deciding to wind up and allow the union to take over its functions, and ICOM merging with the union to bring together the retail and worker co-operative sectors for the first time since they split in 1880. The two groups' members voted to merge in the Autumn of 2001, with ICOM moving its staff and membership to the Manchester offices of the union when the merger was formalised in December 2001.

The union went through a two-year transitional period before the membership voted in December 2002 to rename it Co-operatives UK. The new identity was launched in January 2003, with Green calling the change "our way of showing that the Co-operative Movement now has a single strategic voice in the UK" and using the opportunity to push the revitalised organisation into developing new services, and vigorously promoting the values of the co-operative movement. A "New Ventures" panel was established to promote new co-operative ideas, a Corporate Governance Code of Best Practice was published to help promote good practice and the union began encouraging its members to report on key social and co-operative performance indicators to demonstrate their commitment to co-operative ethical principles. All three initiatives were recommended by the Co-operative Commission to assure the future of the co-operative movement.

Green announced that she intended to retire as chief executive of the organisation in 2009, saying: "I will be 60 at [that time] and I have always intended to retire when I reached that milestone. The Board [of Co-operatives UK] and I agreed that it made sense for me to finish after Co-operative Congress 2009, which is, to all intents and purposes, the end of our co-operative year." In July 2009, it was announced that Ed Mayo would become Secretary General of Co-operatives UK, resigning as Chief Executive of Consumer Focus to take up the post. He took up the position officially the following November.

Co-operatives UK continues to work on behalf of the co-operative movement as a whole, opposing recommendations from the International Accounting Standards Board (IASB) that would have seen co-operative members' share capital classed as debt and "destroyed" the co-operative advantage; responding to a government consultation to amend the Industrial and Provident Societies Act 1965 and encouraging their members to do likewise; and gathering information on the scope and scale of the UK movement, including maintaining a searchable directory of UK co-operatives on its website.

== Co-operatives Fortnight ==
Logo of the first ever Co-operatives Fortnight

In 2010, Co-operatives UK coordinated the UK's first ever Co-operatives Fortnight, running from 19 June to 3 July. The fortnight was marketed as an opportunity to promote the co-operative alternative to tradition business models, under the slogan "There is an alternative". The fortnight included over 150 events in every region and devolved nation across the UK, with over 3,000 stores promoting the Fortnight nationwide and over 4,000 people watching the Co-operatives Fortnight film. During the fortnight, thirteen co-operative schools were established and two parliamentary motions were passed in Westminster and Holyrood.

The event was made possible by eight "founding sponsors": The Co-operative Group, The Midcounties Co-operative, Midlands Co-operative Society, Anglia Regional Co-operative Society, The Southern Co-operative, Chelmsford Star Co-operative Society, Lincolnshire Co-operative and Channel Islands Co-operative Society.

Co-operatives Fortnight has continued as an annual fixture since 2010.

== History ==
=== Foundation ===
During the resurgence in co-operation following the successes of the Rochdale Pioneers and the Co-operative Wholesale Society (CWS), the Co-operative Movement began to lift itself out of the decade of society failures between 1834 and 1844. The success brought pride but also anxiety for the movement's leaders as they began to fear that societies might forget their co-operative ideals in the face of material success. The solution, it was decided at the first of the modern Co-operative Congresses, was the creation of a national organisation that could hold the movement together and emphasise the important role that co-operatives could play in society at large.

The Co-operative Central Board was established in 1869, before changing its name to the Co-operative Union, and spent the first 40 years of its existence operating out of a variety of rented premises in the Long Millgate district of Manchester. Its purpose was described "propagandist and defensive action" and it listed the objectives of establishing and organising co-operative societies and provided advice and instruction on the co-operative principles. These educational activities were formalised first in 1882 with the creation of the education committee and then in 1919 when the Co-operative College was created.

The initial intention of the Union was that it would support and promote the interests of worker co-operatives but, given the number and financial strength of the consumer co-operatives, these soon began to dominate the organisation. Ultimately, this led to the splitting of the worker and consumer sectors of the UK Movement, prompted by the CWS' rejection of the idea of profit-sharing with its employees in 1880. From that point the Co-operative Union became an organisation that predominantly dealt with co-operative retail societies.

=== Holyoake House ===
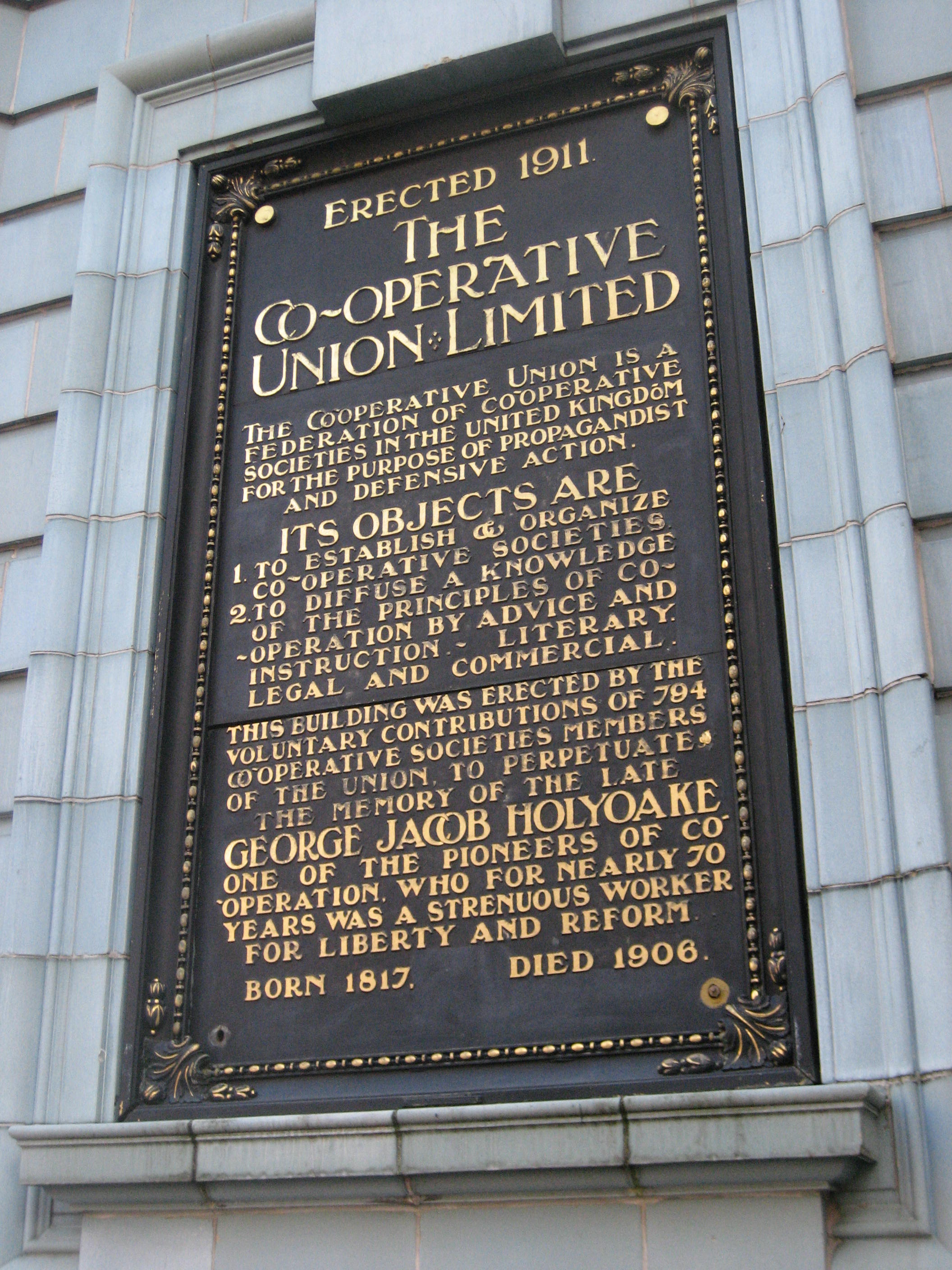
Plaque dedicating Holyoake House to the Memory of George Jacob Holyoake

In 1906 the co-operative activist George Jacob Holyoake died and the Co-operative Movement decided that to commemorate him by building a permanent headquarters for the Co-operative Union. The building was designed by architect F. E. L. Harris, who had also designed the nearby CWS building in the year of Holyoake's death. It was erected in 1911 on Hanover Street (also home to the Co-operative Bank) and named Holyoake House. A plaque was erected outside the building dedicating the building to Holyoake's memory, reading:

This building was erected by the
voluntary contributions of 794
Co-operative Societies members
of the Union to perpetuate
the memory of the late
George Jacob Holyoake
one of the pioneers of Co
-operation, who for nearly 70
years was a strenuous worker
for liberty and reform.
Born 1817. Died 1906.

Holyoake House is also home to the Co-operative College (although between 1940 and 2001, the College moved to Stanford Hall, near Loughborough), the Association of British Credit Unions Limited (ABCUL) and The Co-operative News. The building was extended in the 1930s, and the Training Centre on the top floor was destroyed by an incendiary bomb in the Manchester Blitz of 1940. A collection of Holyoake's letters, papers and other writings are held in store in the National Co-operative Archive, also housed in the building, whilst the building itself received Grade II listed building status on 20 June 1988.

=== Promoting the movement ===
As well as its responsibility for organising the annual Co-operative Congresses, the Co-operative Union had a wider responsibility for promoting co-operation throughout the UK and worldwide. During the First World War, the movement began to feel hostility from the government: requests to set up a system of rationing to prevent private traders from hoarding goods and selling them at inflated prices were initially ignored and then, when sugar rationing was finally introduced, the union was refused a seat on the commission set up to control it although co-operatives were the largest wholesalers and retailers of sugar in the UK. A motion was put forward to the 1917 Congress to abandon the principle of political neutrality and when it was passed The National Co-operative Representation Committee was formed. Its purpose was to represent the views of the co-operative movement in Parliament and it was soon renamed the Co-operative Party, funded by individual societies within the Movement.

The union was also responsible for the establishment of the Independent Co-operative Commission (sometimes called the Gaitskell Commission after its chair Hugh Gaitskell). During a period of dramatic change in the retail landscape the union's Central Executive held discussions with the CWS, the Scottish Co-operative Wholesale Society (SCWS) and the Co-operative Production Federation before introducing a motion to the 1955 Congress empowering them to establish an inquiry commission "charged with the responsibility of surveying the whole field of co-operative production and marketing, both wholesale and retail". It submitted its findings to the union for presentation at the 1958 Congress. The union met the costs of the commission and made its own submission of evidence. The report made 51 recommendations on a variety of issues but failed to have significant impact on the movement, the Co-operative Union concluding in its 1967 Regional Plan that "If the serious warnings of the Independent Commission had been heeded, the Movement would be in far better shape to withstand the impact of new problems which have developed".

=== Changing environment ===
Through the end of the 1960s and the start of the 1970s the working environment of the Union began to change: Britain joined the European Economic Community (EEC) and so closer ties with the ICA were necessary. The retail industry was changing and the Union published its Regional Plan advocating reduction of the number of retail societies (to a "manageable" figure of 50) through mergers. The CWS began taking over some services the Union had traditionally offered, such as its trade Advisory Service, so that the Union had to re-examine and refocus the services it offered its members. On 10 August 1974 it also suffered a serious setback when its newly appointed General Secretary Clarence Hilditch died in office.

== Governance ==
Co-operatives UK is a secondary co-operative, owned and controlled by its 700+ members through an elected board of directors. The membership is made up predominantly of other co-operative enterprises – making Co-operatives UK a co-operative federation – but also includes other co-operative federations, such as the ABCUL, the Plunkett Foundation and Supporters Direct. It also has Co-operative Development Body (CDB) members, and associated and affiliated groups who are not themselves co-operatives but are supportive of the co-operative movement and its principles, such as the Woodcraft Folk or the Building Societies Association. A number of individuals who were members of ICOM before its merger continue to subscribe but are not recognised by the rules. The membership is diverse, reaching from the world's largest consumer co-operative to Oxted School Young Co-operative, a co-operative set up by pupils to sell Fairtrade goods at the school. Its board has 18 members, with places divided through the membership as follows:

- 9 seats for the Co-operative Group
- 1 seat for Central England Co-operative
- 4 seats elected by Consumer Co-operative societies (one from each of four geographic regions: Scotland, the North, the Midlands and the South)
- 2 seats elected by Worker Co-operatives and Employee Owned Businesses
- 1 seat elected by the Co-operative Development Bodies
- 1 seat elected by the remaining membership

As well as its federal members, Co-operatives UK maintains links with other co-operative organisations: it is a member of the International Co-operative Alliance (ICA), it is the trustee of the Co-operative College, and retains a nominated seat on the National Executive Committee of the Co-operative Party.

== General Secretaries and Chief Executives ==
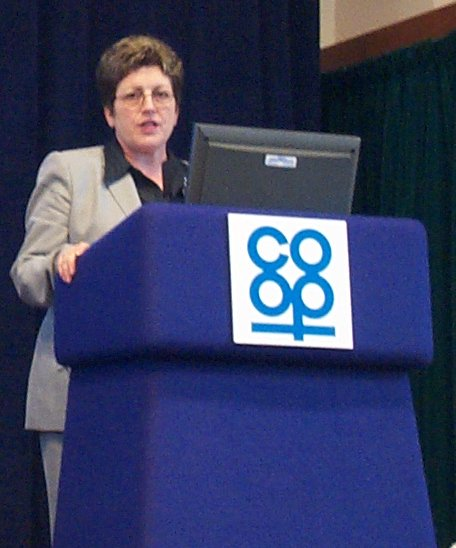
Dame Pauline Green speaking at a co-operative meeting, 2005

=== General Secretaries of the Co-operative Union ===
- Edward Vansittart Neale 1873–1891
- Jesse Clement Gray 1891–1911
- Alfred Whitehead 1911–1929
- Robert Palmer 1929–1947
- Robert Southern 1950–1972
- Clarence Hilditch 1972–1974
- Lloyd Wilkinson 1974–2000
- Pauline Green 2000–2002, becoming Chief Executive of Co-operatives UK

=== Chief Executives of Co-operatives UK ===
- Pauline Green 2002–2009
- Ed Mayo 2009–2020 (serving as Secretary General)
- Rose Marley 2020–present

== See also ==
- List of co-operative federations
- Lloyd Jones
