= Greater Manchester East (European Parliament constituency) =

Former European Parliament constituency

- European Parliament constituency
- Boundary within North West England (1984-1994)
- Member state: United Kingdom
- Created: 1984
- Dissolved: 1999
- MEPs: 1

Greater Manchester East was, from 1984 to 1999, a European Parliament constituency centred on Greater Manchester, in North West England.

From 1984 to 1994, it consisted of the Westminster Parliament constituencies of Ashton-under-Lyne, Cheadle, Denton and Reddish, Hazel Grove, Oldham Central and Royton, Oldham West, Stalybridge and Hyde, and Stockport. From 1994 to 1999 it consisted of Ashton-under-Lyne, Denton and Reddish, Heywood and Middleton, Littleborough and Saddleworth, Oldham Central and Royton, Oldham West, Rochdale, and Stalybridge and Hyde.

Before its uniform adoption of proportional representation in 1999, the United Kingdom used first-past-the-post for the European elections in England, Scotland and Wales. The European Parliament constituencies used under that system were smaller than the later regional constituencies and only had one Member of the European Parliament each.

Boundary within North West England (1994-1999)

== Members of the European Parliament ==
Elected	Member	Party
1984	Glyn Ford	Labour
1989	Glyn Ford	Labour
1994	Glyn Ford	Labour
1999	Constituency abolished: see North West England	

== Election results ==
European Parliament election, 1984: Greater Manchester East
Party	Candidate	Votes	%	±%
Labour	Glyn Ford	65,101	42.7	
Conservative	T. K. (Ken) Thornber	56,415	37.0	
SDP	Mrs. Brigid Gaskin	27,801	18.2	
Ecology	M. J. Shipley	3,158	2.1	
Majority		8,686	5.7	
Turnout		152,475	29.9	
Labour win (new seat)				

European Parliament election, 1989: Greater Manchester East
Party	Candidate	Votes	%	±%
Labour	Glyn Ford	93,294	49.7	+7.0
Conservative	Richard N. Greenwood	58,793	31.3	−5.7
Green	Mike J. Shipley	19,090	10.2	+8.1'"`UNIQ−−ref−00000017−QINU`"'
SLD	A. B. (Brian) Leah	16,645	8.9	−9.3
Majority		34,501	18.4	+12.7
Turnout		187,822	37.0	+7.1
Labour hold		Swing		

European Parliament election, 1994: Greater Manchester East
Party	Candidate	Votes	%	±%
Labour	Glyn Ford	82,289	60.4	+10.7
Conservative	John R. Pinniger	26,303	19.3	−12.0
Liberal Democrats	Alan J. Riley	20,545	15.1	+6.2
Green	Trevor Clarke	5,823	4.3	−5.9'"`UNIQ−−ref−00000021−QINU`"'
Natural Law	William A. Stevens	1,182	0.9	New
Majority		55,986	41.1	+22.7
Turnout		136,142	27.2	−9.8
Labour hold		Swing		
