= Mutuo =

UK think tank

- Founded: 2001; 25 years ago
- Founder: Peter Hunt
- Type: Think tank
- Purpose: Encouraging mutual approaches to business and public policy
- Region served: UK
- Method: Publications, consultancy and advocacy
- Website: www.mutuo.coop

Mutuo is a British advocacy organisation and think tank that advocates mutuals and cooperatives. In anticipation of the 2010 general election, it published the Mutuals Manifesto, which was the subject of an early day motion in the House of Commons.

Through Mutuo, consumer co-operatives, building societies, mutual insurers and friendly societies and other mutuals work together to promote their shared interests to the Government, media and other decision makers. Since 2001, Mutuo has worked to promote new mutuals. This has led to renewed growth in the mutual sector, with public sector mutuals established in health, housing and education and new community based businesses ranging from football to childcare.

Mutuo operates as a not-for-profit Society:

- Campaigning for a better understanding of the benefits of mutual businesses
- Conducting and publishing policy research on issues of importance to the mutual sector
- Developing innovative new mutual businesses for the delivery of public services
- Delivering specialist consultancy services to mutuals
- Providing a Parliamentary monitoring and advisory service for mutual businesses

Mutuo is operated by Westminster Bridge Partnership.
