= National Angel Capital Organization =

The National Angel Capital Organization (NACO Canada) was established in 2002 as the only national industry association for angel investors in Canada. Its national network now includes 4,200 angel investors, 45 incubators and accelerators, and 44 angel groups. Since its formal incorporation as National Angel Organization (NAO) in 2002, NACO Canada has published The Primer for Angel Investment in Canada (2002) and Age of the Angel: Best Practices for Angel Groups and Investors (2007), and A Practical Guide to Angel Investing, 2nd Edition, published in 2017. NAO changed its name from NAO to NACO in 2008.

History

NACO Canada was formed after the second Angel Investor Summit (2002), convened by CHIN UP Fund and chaired by Henry Vehovec. Since then NACO Canada has continued to annually organize an angel investor summit to encourage networking, education, co-investment and sharing of best practices. NACO has spawned the creation of numerous angel groups across Canada, established the Co-Investment Summit and in 2008 launched awards for the top ten angel investments in Canada.

NACO Canada also initiated the formation of the Network of Angel Organizations of Ontario, which now operates as Angel Investors Ontario (AIO).

NACO Canada’s website provides an industry newsletter, links to best practices materials and lists angel groups across the nation.

The founding President and Chair of NACO Canada was Henry Vehovec of Mindfirst and CHIN UP Fund in Toronto. He was succeeded as chair by Dan Mothersill of the Ciris Group in 2004, who in turn was succeeded by a founding partner, Andrew Wilkes. The co-chairs of the organization in 2016 were Ross Finlay and Michelle Scarborough.

In recognition of his dedicated volunteer efforts NACO Canada conferred on Mr. Vehovec the title of Honorary Chair and lifetime membership in 2005.

Present Day

In 2019, NACO Canada announced the appointment of industry veteran Claudio Rojas, as Chief Executive Officer. Rojas has been an outspoken champion of tech companies founded by Canadians in recent years and a frequent critic of the lack of high-growth companies in [Canada]".

In May 2020, The Honourable Mélanie Joly, Canadian Minister of Economic Development and Official Languages, told tech news publication BetaKit the federal government worked to get $962 million in funding for Canada’s Regional Development Agencies, “following conversations with a number of organizations including tech CEOs, chambers of commerce, the National Angel Capital Organization (NACO), and MaRS CEO Yung Wu.”

In July 2020, The Honourable Navdeep Bains, Canadian Minister of Innovation, Science and Industry participated in a NACO Canada Roundtable in which it was announced that angel investment activity had exceeded $1 billion.

With the release of its 2020 Angel Activity Report, NACO Canada made four recommendations to government to stimulate angel investing and support funding for Canadian entrepreneurs in the aftermath of the COVID-19 economic shutdown. These include the creation of a co-investment initiative or “matching funds” that extends to angel investments, correcting for risk by instituting tax incentives to attract more investment into the early-stage tech sector, implementing knowledge-based securities exemptions (at the provincial level) to broaden the pool of prospective angel investors, and to provide increased support to the non-profit angel group network that supports entrepreneurs with centralized and coordinated access to investors.

"To emerge from the economic crisis, Canada needs to activate increased angel capital by an order of magnitude or risk losing a generation of entrepreneurs", said Claudio Rojas, CEO of NACO Canada.

In March 2021, NACO announced its continued national expansion with the launch of Canada Zone, a new hub aimed to facilitate interprovincial investment.

In April 2023, BNN Bloomberg interviewed NACO CEO Claudio Rojas about Canada's innovation economy, risk averse culture and how to approach angel investors.
