= Industrial Common Ownership Movement =

Former group in the United Kingdom

Industrial Commonship
- Industrial Common Ownership Movement
- Abbreviation: ICOM
- Successor: Co-operatives UK
- Formation: 1971
- Defunct: 2001
- Type: worker cooperative
- Legal status: Merged
- Purpose: Coordinate and encourage worker cooperatives
- Region served: United Kingdom

The Industrial Common Ownership Movement (ICOM) was a UK national umbrella organisation for worker cooperatives, set up in 1971 as the successor to the Association for the Democratic Integration of Industry (DEMINTRY). It was based in the Leeds Corn Exchange. It worked to increase the number of worker co-ops in the country. ICOM's model rules for cooperatives, published in 1976, were based on a de-centralised and collectivist concept of democracy. In 2001 ICOM merged with the Co-operative Union to become Co-operatives UK.

ICOM is one of the founder organisations of CECOP, the European regional organisation of CICOPA, the world sectoral organisation for industry and service, and itself part of the International Cooperative Alliance.

== The Industrial Common Ownership Act ==
The Industrial Common Ownership Act that recognised common ownership companies in law was passed by the British Parliament in 1976. The first certificate was awarded to Scott Bader Company. The emphasis on common ownership that inhibits the transfer of capital and assets to private interests is what differentiates the UK cooperative model from its continental European counterpart. ICOM had a monopoly on registering UK co-ops under the common ownership model until the late 1980s.

A number of laws were passed by Labour governments to allocate national and local funding to the costs of starting worker cooperatives. This included the setup of the national Co-operative Development Agency in 1978 and the Inner Urban Areas Act 1978. In subsequent years common ownership was promoted as a model to create employment, and approximately 100 local authorities in the UK established co-operative development agencies for this purpose. Funding was also allocated to co-ops through the job creation schemes of Manpower Services Commission. The number of worker co-ops in the UK grew from 100 or so in the mid-70s to 3000 by around 1990.

== Industrial Common Ownership Finance ==
Industrial Common Ownership Finance (ICOF) was set up in 1973 as a financial arm of ICOM, to allow a revolving loan fund for worker co-operatives. This was needed because worker co-operatives commonly had trouble raising capital since their democratic model excluded the possibility of investment by outside shareholders. In 1976 ICOF received £250 000 through the Industrial Common Ownership Act. The current trading name of ICOF is "Co-operative & Community Finance".
