= National Association of Local Authorities of Georgia =

- საქართველოს ადგილობრივ თვითმმართველობათა ეროვნული ასოციაცია
- Founded: 17 December 2004
- Type: Non-governmental organization; non-profit; non-political
- Purpose: Local self-governance, decentralisation, local democracy, gender equality
- Headquarters: 142 A. Beliashvili Street, Tbilisi, Georgia
- Region served: Georgia
- Methods: Advocacy, capacity building, training, international cooperation, policy development
- Members: All local self-governing entities in Georgia
- Key people: Giorgi Tkemaladze (First Vice-President)
- Affiliations: Council of Europe, European Commission, CEMR, PLATFORMA
- Website: nala.ge

The National Association of Local Authorities of Georgia was set up in 2003 by the Congress of Local and Regional Authorities of the Council of Europe under the instruction of the Council of Europe and the European Commission in order to carry out a new joint activity for setting up a national association of local authorities in Georgia.

== Sources ==
- Council of Europe Page on the National Association of Local Authorities of Georgia
