= Chelmsford Star Co-operative Society =

Former consumer co-operative in the United Kingdom

Chelmsford Star Co-operative Society Limited
- Formerly: Chelmsford Star Co-operative Industrial Society, Limited (1867–1968)
- Type: Consumer Co-operative
- Industry: Retail (Wholesale)
- Founded: 11 April 1867
- Defunct: 19 December 2025
- Fate: Merged with Central England Co-operative
- Successor: Central England Co-operative
- Headquarters: 220 Moulsham Street, Chelmsford, Essex CM2 OLS
- Key people: Barry Wood, Chief Executive Officer
- Products: Grocer, Department Store, Funeral Director, Travel Agent
- Revenue: £113.5 million (52 weeks ending January 26, 2019)
- Number of employees: 884
- Website: chelmsfordstar.coop

Chelmsford Star Co-operative Society Limited was an independent consumer co-operative in the United Kingdom. Established in 1867, it merged with Central England Co-operative in 2025.

== History ==
The society was established in Chelmsford by iron foundry workers in 1867, with the intention of becoming "the Star of the County". In 1969, it merged with the Braintree Co-operative Society, which had been formed by silk weavers in 1864.

In its first year of trading, Chelmsford Star Industrial Co-operative Society had a membership of 275 and annual sales of £4,316. By 1900, with 1,439 registered co-operatives in the UK, membership had risen to 2,001, with annual sales of £40,414. In 1954, with membership standing at 19,089, the Society achieved sales of over £1 million for the first time.

Following a vote meeting the required majority at special general meetings held on 16 July and 5 August 2025, Chelmsford Star was transferred to Central England Co-operative on 15 September. However, the Chelmsford Star trading name continues to be used locally.

== Activities ==
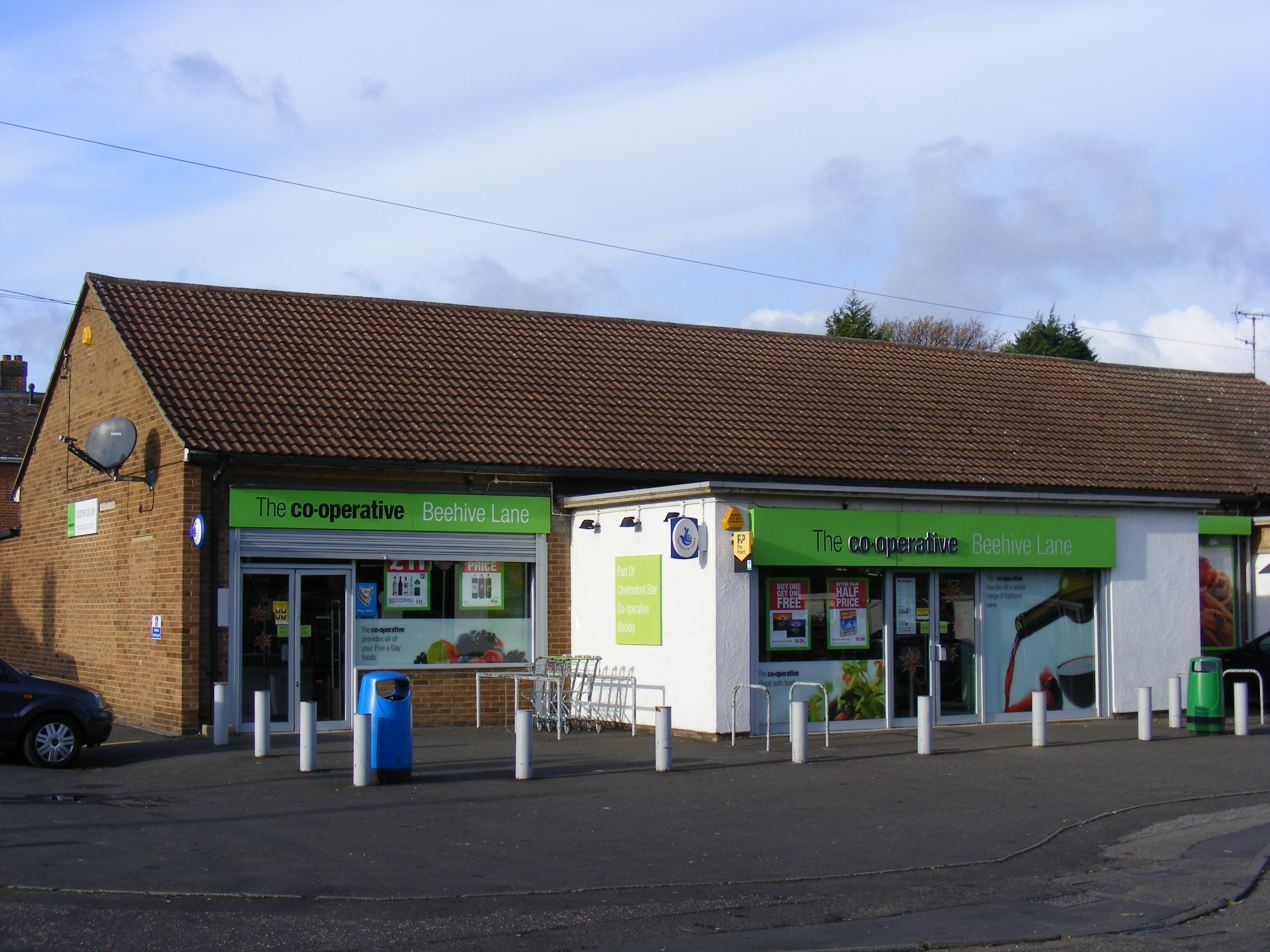
Chelmsford Star convenience store in Great Baddow.

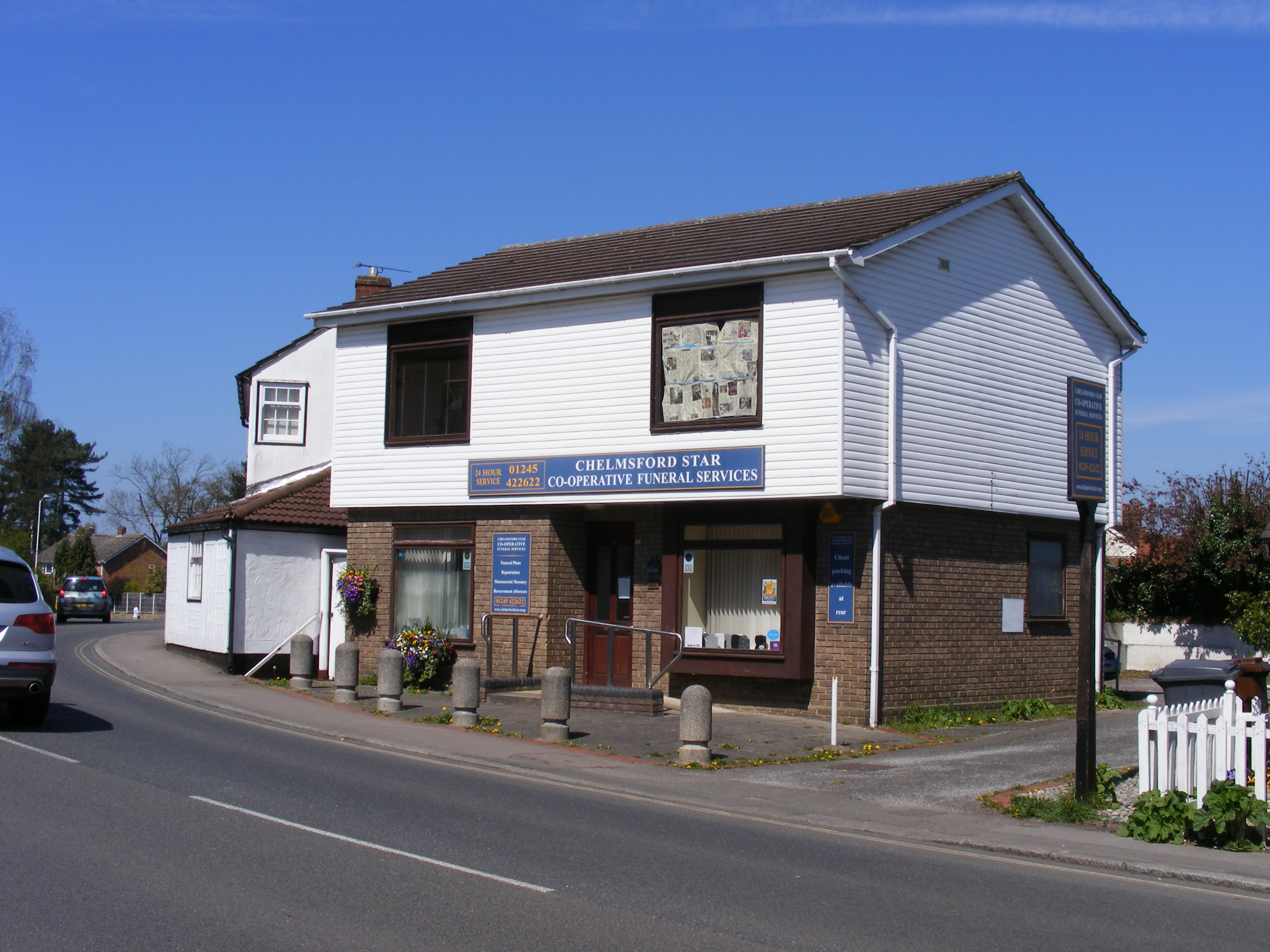
One of the society's funeral directors in Writtle.

As of May 2019, the society operated 40 convenience stores under The Co-operative Food fascia, 2 Quadrant department stores (each of which with The Co-operative Travel branches) in Chelmsford and Braintree, and eight Chelmsford Star Co-operative Funeral Services. The 40 convenience stores covered not only the core Chelmsford/Braintree area but also extend as far out as Woodford Green, Ilford and Romford in East London to the southwest and from Grays through East Tilbury to Shoeburyness along the Thames Estuary to the south and southeast.

Membership of the society was open to all residents of the society's mid-Essex trading area, with members receiving a share of the profits in the form of dividend.

Chelmsford Star Co-operative Party was founded by members of the society in 1943 to promote and protect co-operatives and co-operative values.

== See also ==
- British co-operative movement
- Credit unions in the United Kingdom
