= European Year for Development =

2015 was designated the European Year for Development by the European Parliament and the Council of the European Union in Decision No 472/2014/EU.

In 2015, the Millennium Development Goals (MDGs) came to an end and the process of defining an international development agenda to replace them culminated with the adoption of the 2030 Agenda for Sustainable Development, which includes a set of 17 Sustainable Development Goals. The United Nations Climate Change Conference COP21, which aims to achieve a global agreement on climate action, will also be held at the end of 2015.

In this context 2015 was considered a timely opportunity to raise awareness on the European Union's current development co-operation and to encourage engagement of EU citizens in development policy.

== Objectives ==
The objectives of the European Year for Development are to:

1. Inform Union citizens about EU development co-operation, the results that the EU, together with Member States, has achieved as a global player and will continue to pursue
2. Foster direct involvement, critical thinking and active interest of Union citizens and stakeholders in development co-operation.
3. Raise awareness of the mutual benefits of EU development co-operation, achieve a broader understanding of policy coherence for development and foster a sense of joint responsibility, solidarity and opportunity in an increasingly interdependent world.

== Target audience ==
The campaign aims to reach the broadest number of people in EU member states. While particular focus is placed on young people (primarily between 15 and 24 years old), other key target audiences include European development experts, academia, civil society in the 28 EU Member States, policy makers, media and the broader public.

=== Communication strategy ===
The EYD2015 is a synergistic campaign, coordinated by the European Commission and implemented in a decentralised manner in the participating EU member states and in partnership with other EU development stakeholders. Partners include EU institutions, international organisations, development NGOs, academia, private sector and among others. Central to the EYD2015 communication campaign are the principles of co-communication, co-branding and co-creation of content. Partners initiate and carry out their own EYD2015 activities in line with the EYD2015 objectives and make use of communication guidelines and toolkits provided by the European Commission.

The official EYD2015 website brings in one space all the elements of the EYD2015 campaign, featuring all participating organisations, a calendar of events at EU level and in the member states and stories and posts from all partners, showcasing the plurality of perspectives on EU development co-operation.

The EYD2015 Twitter and Facebook accounts are curated by campaign partners in turns of one week.

Every month was dedicated to a theme inspired by the UN Observances Weeks and Months:

1. January - Europe in the World
2. February - Education
3. March - Women and Girls
4. April - Health
5. May - Peace and Security
6. June - Sustainable Green Growth, Decent Jobs and Businesses
7. July - Children and Youth
8. August - Humanitarian Aid
9. September - Demography and Migration
10. October - Food Security
11. November - Sustainable Development and Climate Change
12. December - Human Rights

== Campaign activities ==
Throughout 2015, numerous activities took place across Europe aimed at raising awareness, informing and engaging EU citizens in development co-operation. Hundreds of EYD2015 events were organised throughout Europe (at least 700 listed on the EYD2015 website), reaching millions of people, especially youth.

Campaign activities included dedicated EU development days, development storytelling, education materials for students, social media campaigns, special edition newspapers, public debates, movie screenings, initiatives with schools and universities, competitions, exhibitions, flash mobs, road tours and much more in all EU member states.

Examples include

Afropean+, a one-day public event (17 January) dedicated to interculturality which marked the opening of the European Year for Development in Brussels. Activities included concerts, film screenings, debates, a craft fair and exhibitions.

Distribution in 18 EU member states of a special edition of the EYD Days publication, which focuses on positive stories from the development countries in order convey the idea that ending poverty is not impossible.

Kapuscinski Development Lectures, a series of lectures and discussions with influential thinkers and public figures on development issues. The high-level events contribute to the debate and formulation of the European development policy. They are also live streamed online.

The ninth edition of European Development Days (EDD), Europe's leading forum on development and international co-operation, was held on 3 and 4 June in Brussels and was attended by over 5000 participants. The headline theme under which the panel discussions, special addresses, workshops and press conferences took place, was "Our world, our dignity, our future", the motto of the European Year for Development.
