= Cooperatives Europe =

European co-operative alliance

- Company type: Cooperative federation
- Founded: 2006
- Headquarters: Brussels, Belgium
- Area served: Europe
- Key people: Agnès Mathis, Director and Giuseppe Guerini, President
- Members: 84 member organisations in 33 European countries
- Website: coopseurope.coop

Cooperatives Europe is the European regional office of the International Co-operative Alliance. According to the organization, its mission is to act on behalf of cooperative enterprises in Europe, with a goal to promote the cooperative business model and advocate for a "level playing field between cooperatives and other forms of enterprise".

As of 2026, it consists of 84 member organizations from 33 European countries across all business sectors. According to an in-house study, its member organizations collectively federate an estimated 176,461 cooperative businesses, owned by 141 million individual member cooperators, and counting 4.7 million employees.

== Overview ==
On the first Saturday of July each year, Cooperatives Europe celebrates International Co-operative Day.

Cooperatives Europe claims to increase knowledge of the cooperative business model across Europe and to facilitate the development of cooperative enterprises. Cooperatives Europe is registered in the European Union Transparency Register, created by the European Commission.

Cooperatives Europe is developing a European network of Young Cooperators.

== History ==
The office was established on 7 March 2006 as a nonprofit organization under Belgian law (ASBL).

Since 2012, Cooperatives Europe has been recognized as a Civil Society Organization and takes part in the Policy Forum on Development, organized by the European Commission's DG DevCo. Cooperatives Europe has organized several seminars on international cooperation, such as the event Cooperatives and Sustainable Development: Challenges for the Post-2015 Agenda, co-organized with CoopBuro in Brussels, among others.

Cooperatives Europe was one of the partners within the European Year for Development (EYD2015).
