= Co-operative Congress =

Annual UK co-operative movement conference

Cover of the handbook of the 28th Annual Co-operative Congress at Woolwich 1896

The Co-operative Congress is the national conference of the UK Co-operative Movement. The first of the modern congresses took place in 1869 following a series of meetings called the "Owenite Congress" in the 1830s. Members of Co-operatives UK (previously the Co-operative Union) send delegates to the annual congress, where reports of national bodies are made and debates held on subjects of importance to the Co-operative Movement. The meetings also include the Annual General Meeting of Co-operatives UK.

== History ==
The first Co-operative Congresses were the Owenite Congresses, which provided a gathering place for the fledgling co-operative movement that was growing in the wake of the 1795 foundation of the Hull Anti-Mill, a corn mill that was also an early co-operative. The Manchester Congress of 1830, organised by the Manchester and Salford Co-operative Council, is widely cited as the first of the Owenite Congresses. However, George Jacob Holyoake, in The History of Co-operation, describes the discovery of a record of an even earlier Congress, at which Robert Owen had been present, this first Co-operative Congress being held in Manchester on 26 May 1827. The Owenite Congresses stopped in 1835, being replaced by Socialist Congresses with a broader range of delegates - but the 1860s saw increased agitation for them to be renewed from co-operators such as ET Craig and Alexander Campbell, and the first of the modern series was held in 1869.

The first of the modern Congresses was held in London. It was attended by a variety of British and foreign delegates, with co-operative activist (and author of Tom Brown's School Days) Thomas Hughes MP acting as its first president. Messages of support were read out from John Ruskin, John Stuart Mill and Florence Nightingale, who offered "any aid in my power to your Co-operative Congress, in whose objects I am deeply interested". It was the only one of the modern series not to be organised by Co-operatives UK: this was because one of the orders of business for the first Congress was the creation of the organisation, then called the Co-operative Central Board. Co-operatives UK was founded out of concerns that the success of the Co-operative Movement might lead to a loss of identity and its original vision, and was intended to be a national organisation to bind the Movement together and emphasise the role of co-operatives in wider society.

Co-operatives UK also took responsibility for organising the Co-operative Congress, and the annual meetings were the centre of the national Movement: most major changes in the movement came out of the Co-operative Congresses, such as the abandoning of political neutrality and the formation of the Co-operative Party (1917 Congress), the formalisation of ties to the Labour Party (1927 Congress) or the founding of the Independent Co-operative Commission chaired by Hugh Gaitskell (1955 Congress). The Congress has carried on to the modern day as a two-day event, with the only break being in 1944 when war conditions meant it was impossible for delegates to travel.

== Publications ==
Verbatim proceedings of Congress used to be published by Co-operatives UK shortly after each event. Between 1880 and 1960, Congress handbooks were also published giving a history of the area the event was being held in and details of the co-operatives that were based there. From 1869 to 1899, Congress Papers on topics that would be discussed and debated at the event were also published, often in pamphlet form. Examples of these are held in the National Co-operative Archive, maintained by the Co-operative College.

== Presidents ==
Beginning with the first modern Congress in 1869, a Congress president was elected to preside over the event: to begin with, a president was elected for each day of Congress, but from 1896 a single president was elected for the whole event. Being president was considered the highest honour in the UK Co-operative Movement, with societies nominating individuals for the position in recognition of their contribution to the movement. The President was presented with a commemorative medal, and gave a keynote address to the conference.

The Congress voted to abolish the position of president in 2007, with Alan Gill (former chief executive of United Co-operatives) being the last to serve in the position.
