= Lennox Fyfe, Baron Fyfe of Fairfield =

British politician (1941–2011)

The Right Honourable The Lord Fyfe of Fairfield
- The Lord Fyfe of Fairfield

Member of the House of Lords
- Lord Temporal
- Life peerage 16 May 2000 – 1 February 2011

Personal details
- Born: 10 April 1941
- Died: 1 February 2011 (aged 69)

George Lennox ("Len") Fyfe, Baron Fyfe of Fairfield (10 April 1941 – 1 February 2011) was a British politician and life peer who sat as a Labour and Co-operative member of the House of Lords.

Fyfe was born at Sauchie, Clackmannanshire, the son of George Lennox Fyfe and Elizabeth Struthers Fyfe. He was educated at Alloa Academy and Co-operative College, Loughborough.

Fyfe made his career in the Co-operative movement, initially in Scotland; he was general manager of the Kirriemuir Co-operative Society from 1966 to 1968, and regional manager of the Scottish Co-operative Society from 1968 to 1972. He was group general manager of the Co-operative Wholesale Society from 1972 to 1975. He was Chief Executive of the Leicestershire Co-operative Society from 1975 to 1995, and, following a merger, held the same position at the Midlands Co-operative Society until 2000. He was a member of the East Midlands Economic Planning Council from 1976 to 1979.

Fyfe worked variously as director, deputy chairman or chairman of many co-operative businesses from the early 1980s onwards, including Shoefayre, Co-operative Wholesale Society, Co-operative Insurance Society, The Co-operative Bank and Unity Trust Bank. He was also a member of the central committee of the International Co-operative Alliance and was president of the Co-operative Congress in 2001.

He was created a life peer on 16 May 2000 as Baron Fyfe of Fairfield, of Sauchie in Clackmannanshire. In the House of Lords he was a member of the European Union Committee, sitting on sub-committees on Environment, Agriculture, Public Health and Consumer Protection until 2003, and on the Internal Market from 2005 until his death.

Fyfe was a justice of the peace for Perthshire from 1972 to 1975. He was also director of Central Television from 1983 to 1992, and a member of the court of Leicester University.

Lennox Fyfe married Ann Clark in 1965; she died in 1999. The couple had a son (deceased) and a daughter.

== Sources ==
- parliament.uk
- leighrayment.com
- https://publications.parliament.uk/pa/ld200506/ldjournal/239/074.htm
- Who's Who 2011
