= Annie Tomlinson =

- Born: 29 June 1870; Rochdale
- Died: 6 April 1933 (aged 62); Blackpool
- Writing career
- Subject: British co-operative movement

Annie Tomlinson or Annie Bamford (29 June 1870 – 6 April 1933) was a British journalist and co-operative movement supporter.

== Life ==
Tomlinson was born in Rochdale. Her parents were Elizabeth and Samuel Bamford who published the Co-operative News. She was given a liberal education at home and she attended the Manchester High School for Girls. In 1904 she became the editor of her fathers paper's Woman's Section. This was a prestigious role that had been created for Alice Acland on 6 January 1883. Acland went on to found the Co-operative Women's Guild.

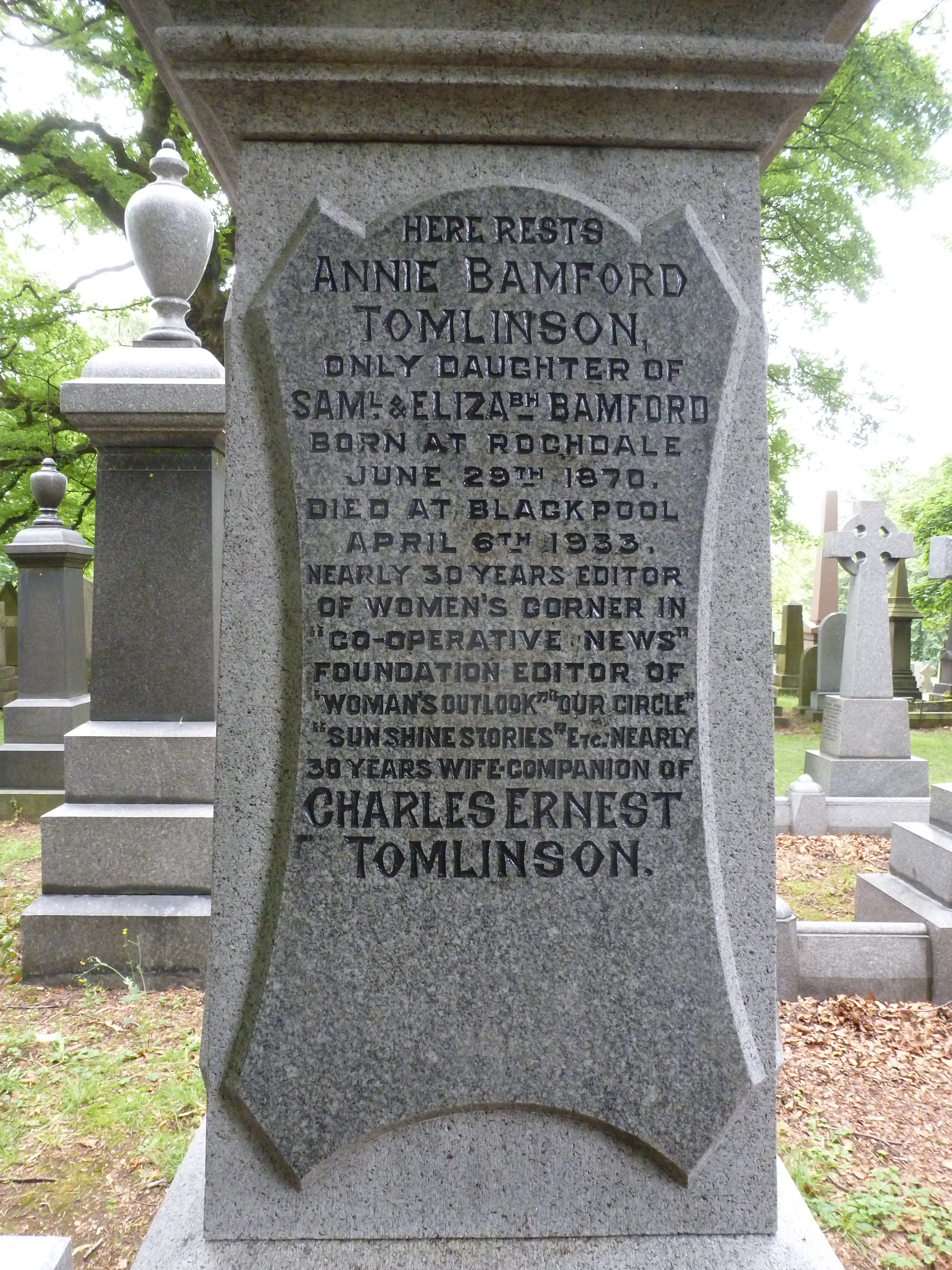
Her gravestone

Tomlinson found her lifetime passion for the Co-operative Women's Guild when she heard their inspiring general secretary Margaret Llewelyn Davies speak. By the age of 22 she was the secretary of the guild's northern section. In 1907 she published a children's journal titled Our Circle. In 1919 she became the first editor of Women's Outlook.

Tomlinson stopped editing Women's Outlook and died soon after in Blackpool in 1933. She was buried in her home town. Her husband Charles Ernest Tomlinson, who she had married nearly 30 years before, had a gravestone made that recorded her achievements.
