= Danish cooperative movement =

Cooperative movement in Denmark

The Danish cooperative movement (Danish: Andelsbevægelsen) is a cooperative movement with profound influence on the economic, organizational and industrial development of Denmark from the 1790s. The movement originally emerged in rural communities and was used widely in farming and the industrial development of the agricultural industry. It soon diversified into consumer organizations and in the 1900s, housing, retail and banking among other sectors.

The Danish cooperative movement employs a means of economical and productive organization under the leadership of consumer- or producer-controlled corporations, where each individual member owns a part of the corporation. Members of the cooperative corporations seek to share the economic stress of producing or buying goods, and divide the eventual end-year financial surplus amongst themselves. The specific rules of ownership vary greatly between individual cooperative corporations, as some divide the financial risk equally, while others give more power to the most financially involved individuals.

== Early history ==
About 90% of all farming soil in Denmark was cooperative from 1300, as the Black Death depopulated the rural parts of the country. Then, the inhabitants of a Danish village would work together, forming Landsbyfællesskaber (village communes). To distribute land fairly between farmers, the land was normally distributed between all farmers in a village with each of them owning a strip of land on every field. Re-allocation of land took place if the size of the individual families changed strongly. In this system, it was virtually impossible to only work individually, since the plots of land might have the full length of the field, but only be a few meters wide. A second characteristic was that all farms were located close together and near the church, with the result that fields far from the village were often poorly utilized.

== The Enclosure Movement ==
This all changed in the enclosure movement between 1750 and 1800, which aimed to reunite fields and award them to one owner only. Any farmer would normally be awarded a coherent piece of land and perhaps an additional piece of forest. In many villages, farmers were either forced or strongly encouraged to tear down their homes and rebuild them in the middle of their new fields with the intention that this would give them easier access to every part of the field, enabling them to utilize the land more effectively. These events are known as Landboreformerne (the agricultural reforms) or Udskiftningen (the parcellation), and were instigated at the initiative of the Danish Crown to raise production. For the next century, a standard village would be composed of a series of farms, many located a distance from each other, each family working for itself producing grain and raising a few animals.

After the Second War of Schleswig in 1864, two new movements hit Denmark. One was a successful attempt to reclaim moors in central and western Jutland for farming; mostly sandy land abandoned in the 14th century as a result of the Black Plague, but in many cases good for potatoes. This movement was initiated by Hedeselskabet (the Heath Association). Equally important was an influx to the world market of grain from the Russian provinces Ukraine and Poland, resulting in a sharp drop in price. The most important factor was a flood of agricultural imports to Britain, Denmark's primary market for grains, from a rapidly industrializing United States, which caused not only a sharp drop in prices, but an agriculture crisis throughout Europe in the final decade of the 19th century. This affected the income of many Danish farmers and the result was a change in production; from grain to dairy products and meat. When a farmer couldn't sell his grain, he fed it to his cows and pigs.

== Cooperative production ==
This change in production resulted in a need for dairies and slaughterhouses. A Danish minister visited England and studied the Rochdale Principles system of co-operatives, which he then brought back to Denmark. The only way to pay for such massive investments was for a large group of farmers to share the cost and risk between them, thus creating the cooperative dairies and slaughterhouses. The new situation implied that farmers would buy cheap grain from Russia and feed it to their livestock, selling milk, butter, eggs and meat for a much higher price. The first cooperative dairy was initiated in 1882 in Hjedding, a small village in western Jutland, and the movement subsequently resulted in the creation of the now large and well-known Danish Bacon and Danish Lurpak Butter brands.

The combination of the Cooperative Movement and the switch away from the production of grain resulted in a great increase in wealth for the average Danish farmer and it became very important in the way Danish farmers perceived themselves. The system was also attempted in other places where Danes settled, for example in the Danish communities in the United States. Before World War I, Denmark gained a foothold on the Russian market, and the Russian Revolution of 1917 cost Danish industry dearly. Attempts to construct cooperative dairies in Russia played a large role in this policy, but only a few were actually built there. The Russian Revolution destroyed this work, but new attempts were made in the Baltic States during the Interwar period. Attempts to export the system to Poland were considered in the Danish Ministry of Foreign Affairs to boost the exports of Danish machinery. Attempts to export this system were often linked with attempts to export the Danish system of secondary education for farmers; Højskolebevægelsen.

== Second redistribution of land ==
Denmark saw a second redistribution of land, which effectively meant the creation of a number of small-scale farms (husmandsbrug). The top stratum in a village was the priest and schoolmaster, then came the big landowners; "gårdmænd" or better. Next level of society was the craftsmen who normally owned a bit of land as well. The bottom of society was formed by "husmænd" and landless people.

The land acquired from the manors was paid for in cash by the government, and was used not to increase the existing farms in size, but to create new ones. The impact was most prominent in Southern Jutland (Northern Schleswig) which had been reunited with Denmark in 1920. Before the war in 1864, Northern Schleswig had a population density pretty much the same as the rest of the country; in 1920 it had virtually the same population as in 1860, while the population density of the rest of Denmark had doubled. Here the Danish government forced through an acquisition of large German Domänenpächter farms; splitting them up into smaller units, that was effectively a way to try to ensure that Danes didn't leave the poorly populated and poorly industrialized province.

== Influence ==
The cooperative idea and organization of the Danish cooperative movement has made a large and lasting impact on the farming and industrial sector in Denmark and has also inspired other groups to form cooperatives independently of the original movement. Notable examples of the legacy of the Danish cooperative movement includes the following:

Dairies
In the 1950s, a joint stock company was formed out of a series of dairies, uniting into two rivals Mejeriselskaberne Danmark and Kløver who later merged to found MD Foods (now Arla Foods) which controls almost all of the Danish milk market. The Danish Crown meat processing company also owes its existence to the cooperative movement.

Co-op shops
The cooperative movement have also resulted in a series of co-op retail chains, now known as Coop Danmark (formerly FDB), which are administered by The Danish Consumers Co-operative Society. The stores keeps a large share of the Danish consumer goods market and had 1.4 million members as of 2017.

Wind mills

The cooperative ownership model for wind mills was developed in Denmark. First for smaller wind mills, later for wind farms. One of the biggest cooperatively owned wind farms is at Middelgrunden in Copenhagen and at the Samsø island.

Communities

In the late 70's early 80's, collective lifestyle, including cooperative production, became very popular in Denmark. Some of the intentional communities that emerged from that era, still exist, such as the Svanholm community, started in 1978. Freetown Christiania was established in 1971, when a group of young hippies occupied abandoned military grounds in Copenhagen, and several collectives also emerged from the Danish fraction of the squatting movement ("BZ" in Danish) of the 80's. People living in these communities often practice environmental consciousness, and some have joined the Danish Ecovillage Network.

Co-housing
Living in co-housing groups with a common area and community house is relatively common in Denmark. The community house is used for gatherings, common eatings, common washing machines, meetings and celebrations. There are three types of co-housing groups:

- One type, where the flats or houses are financed and built by one of the Danish housing associations, subsequently renting out to members only. The co-housing organisation Lejerbo with 37,000 apartments across Denmark is one example. In English, this type of housing is often referred to as social co-housing.
- Another, where residents are collectively owning the homes, the land and the initial financing loan. In Danish, this kind of co-housing is called "andelsbolig".
- A third type, where people own the community house and the land collectively, but each family finances and individually owns the house they build and live in. The AiH community in Hjortshøj is one example.
