= Co-operative Women's Guild =

Auxiliary organisation of the co-operative movement

The Co-operative Women's Guild, founded in 1883, was an auxiliary organisation of the co-operative movement in the United Kingdom that promoted women in co-operative structures and provided social and other services to its members.

== History ==
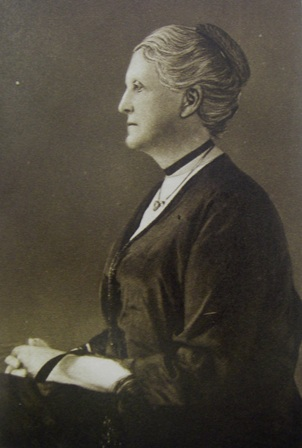
Alice Acland

The guild was founded in 1883 by Alice Acland, who edited the "Women's Corner" of the Co-operative News, and Mary Lawrenson, a teacher who suggested the creation of an organization to promote instructional and recreational classes for mothers and girls. Acland began organizing a Women's League for the Spread of Co-operation, which held its first formal meeting of 50 women at the 1883 Co-operative Congress in Edinburgh and established local branches. It began as an organization dedicated to spreading the co-operative movement, but soon expanded beyond the retail-based focus of the movement to organizing political campaigns on women's issues including health and suffrage. Annie Williams, a suffragette organiser for the Women's Social and Political Union in Newcastle found in 1910 that "Co-operative women are very keen to know about 'Votes for Women'."

In 1884, the league changed its name to the Women's Co-operative Guild and later to the Co-operative Women's Guild. In 1899, Margaret Llewelyn Davies was elected general secretary of the Guild and was widely credited with greatly increasing the success of the Guild. By 1910, it had 32,000 members. Maternity benefits were included in the National Insurance Act 1911 because of the guild's pressure. The guild became more politically active, and expanded its work beyond the British Isles; their objectives included the establishment of minimum wages and maternity benefits, and in April 1914 they were involved in an International Women's Congress at The Hague, which passed a resolution totally opposing war:

this Conference is of opinion that the terrible method of war should never again be used to settle disputes between nations, and urge that a partnership of nations, with peace as its object, should be established and enforced by the people's will.

In July 1931 the Women's Co-operative Guild at their conference passed a resolution advocating compulsory sterilisation for the mentally or physically unfit.

After World War I, the guild became more involved in peace activism, concentrating especially on the social and political conditions that encouraged or gave rise to war, as well as opposition to the arms trade. In 1933 they introduced the White Poppy as a pacifist alternative to the British Legion's annual red poppy appeal. At this time membership of the guild was at its peak, with 1,500 branches and 72,000 members.

The guild continued with several local branches, although it did not have the visibility within the co-operative movement that it once did. It closed after 133 years on 25 June 2016.

== General secretaries ==
1883: Alice Acland
1885: Mary Lawrenson
1889: Margaret Llewelyn Davies
1922: Honora Enfield
1927: Eleanor Barton
1937: Rose Simpson
1940: Cecily Cook
1953: Mabel Ridealgh
1963: Kathleen Kempton
1983: Diane Paskin
Sue Bell
2005: Claire Morgan
2011: Colette Harber

== See also ==
- Marie Stopes#Eugenics
