= Max Radestock =

German Konsumgenossenschafter

Max Radestock (21 February 1854 - 10 January 1913) was a German consumer cooperative member (Konsumgenossenschafter) and the first chairman of the board of the Central Association of German Consumer Associations (ZdK), founded in 1903.

== Biography ==
Max was born in Dresden. Orphaned at the age of 9 years, he left elementary school, to apprentice as a soap maker for his foster father's company. A local pastor noted his intelligence, and arranged for him at the age of 18 years to travel for three years across Germany. Her returned to Dresden to oversee a ceramics factory.

In 1885 he was elected to the board of the Consumer Cooperative (Konsumverein) of Pieschen. By 1892, he was the full-time director of this cooperative. In 1897, he became the director of the Association of Saxon Consumer Associations. In 1903, he became president of the Central Association of German Consumer Associations (or Cooperatives).

The Consumer Cooperatives were organizations founded in the latter half of the 19th-century, filling a niche in between the organizations led by large industrialists, such as the General Association of German Employers and Business Cooperatives; and labor-focused organizations led by Socialist-inspired theories. They tried to service the needs of small businesses, including farmers, and their workers.

== Bibliography ==
- Derived from German Wikipedia entry
- Heinrich Kaufmann: Festschrift for the 25th anniversary of the Central Association of German Consumer Associations. Published on behalf of the board and committee of the Central Association of German Consumer Associations, printed by the Verlagsgesellschaft deutscher Verbrauchervereine m.b.H., Hamburg 1928, page 308.
- Renate Schönfuss: Max Hirschnitz and Max Radestock from Langebrück shaped German consumer history. , retrieved on January 2, 2017.
