= Co-operative Press =

Publisher of Co-op News

Co-operative Press Limited
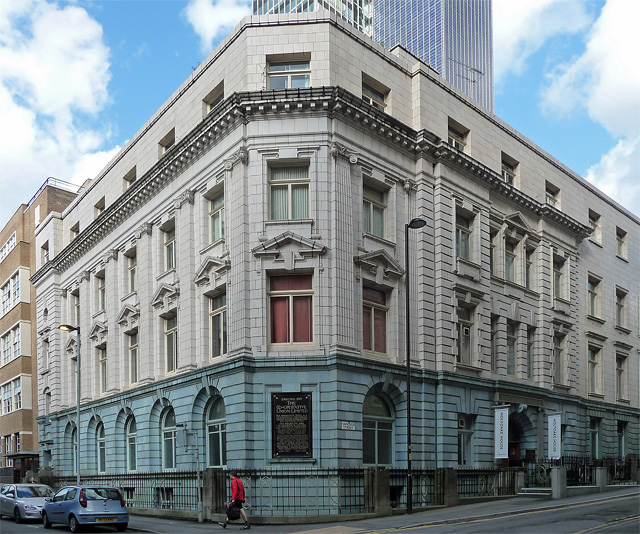
- Holyoake House in Manchester.
- Formerly: Co-operative Newspaper Society (1871–1921); National Co-operative Publishing Society (1921–1935)
- Company type: Registered Society (1585R)
- Industry: News media; Co-operative movement
- Predecessor: North of England Co-operative Printing Society (1869),
- Founded: 1871; 155 years ago. Incorporated 19 March 1873.
- Headquarters: Holyoake House, Manchester, England
- Key people: Elaine Dean (Chair); Richard Bickle (Secretary)
- Revenue: £252,372 (2018)
- Total assets: £315,531 (2018)

The Co-operative Press is a co-operative whose principal activity is the publication of Co-op News, the news magazine of the global co-operative movement. The society's stated mission is to "connect, champion and challenge the global co-operative movement". The co-operative's members are the subscribers of Co-op News.

== History ==
Founded in Manchester in 1873, the Co-operative Press is still headquartered in the city, at Holyoake House.

The society was first incorporated as the Co-operative Newspaper Society by a group of co-operative societies to take on the publishing of The Co-operative News. Printing was carried out by the Co-operative Printing Society.

In 1921 the society merged with the Scottish Co-operative Newspaper Society and renamed itself as the National Co-operative Publishing Society, before taking on its current name – the Co-operative Press – in 1935. That year, substantial funding was finally secured with assistance from the sector's federal bodies, allowing the paper to be extensively reorganised. According to G.D.H. Cole in A Century of Co-operation, it had come to be regarded as one of the most efficiently managed newspapers in Britain, and, from a democratic perspective, a leading example. The editor until 1942 was Mr S. R. Elliot, who assembled notable contributors from the period. Former Labour MP, chairman of the Co-operative Party and Minister for Transport, Alfred Barnes, had served as chairman of the Co-operative Press around this time. Mary Stott, known for her role as women's editor at the Guardian, edited the women's and children's section of the Co-operative Press from 1933-1945. During her tenure, she noted that its primary organ, The Co-operative News, possessed a primarily working-class readership, and had staff working out of bases in London and Manchester. The March 1966 edition of Labour Monthly recalled how, in the 1930s, the Co-operative Press, as an example of "non-capitalist forms of organisation and management," had at times been unsuccessful, because the presence of "elected Management Committees with no knowledge of the complicated business of newspaper production and promotion can be quite catastrophic." When Elliot proposed substantial changes and an increased editorial staff following its expansion in 1935-36, it had been rejected by the board.

Following the creation of the 'National Co-operative Authority' by the Co-operative Congress in 1932, the Press was granted representation on the body. In the mid-1930s, the Press had head-offices at 22 Long Millgate, Manchester City, as well as at Wicklow St., Camden, Greater London.

By the 1950s, it was the largest publication of the co-operative business sector. During the 1960s, the Co-operative Press occupied the Veno Building (a former pharmaceutical headquarters, which was renamed as 'Progress House') on Chester Road, Old Trafford, Greater Manchester. A large Art Deco building, it was home to the Trafford Press. The Trafford Press, described by Printweek as the "printing arm of the Co-op," had printed match programmes for Manchester United F.C.

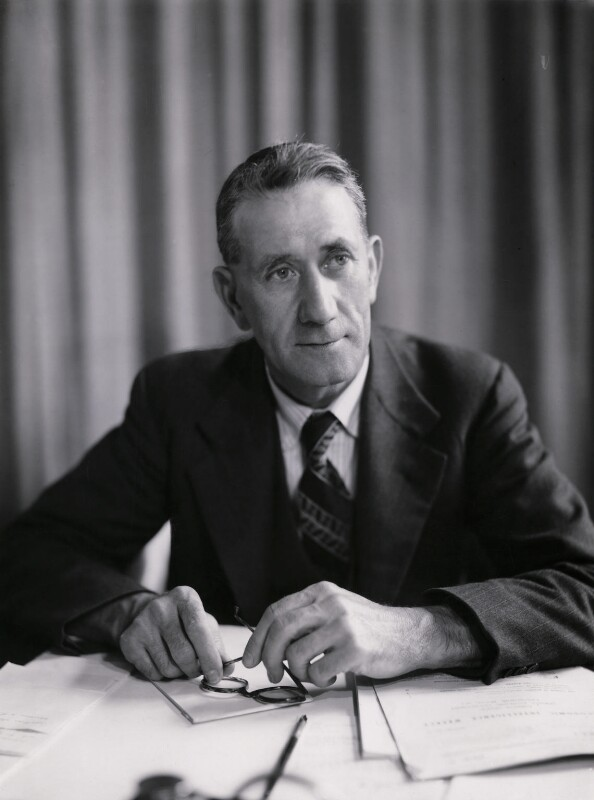
Former Minister for Transport, Alfred Barnes, served as chairman of the Co-operative Press.

The Press was embroiled in a labour dispute in the 1960s. As outlined in A History of the Society of Graphical and Allied Trades, the Co-operative Press employed 150 production staff at its Manchester printing facility, which produced magazines and general print items. Prior to the introduction of web-offset presses in 1966, the majority of work was conducted on letterpress machines managed by machine minders and assistants affiliated with the NGA and SOGAT (Division 1), respectively. A minor lithography division existed at the facility managed by ASLP members. In 1964, the company declared its plan to implement a web-offset press for the production of several periodicals and, subsequently, a tabloid newspaper. Representatives from ASLP, NGA, and SOGAT were scheduled to examine the press at the manufacturer's facility. Since some of the work for the press had previously been printed using a rotary letterpress machine, the Co-op determined that the crew for the new press should consist of craftsmen from both the ASLP and the NGA, together with assistants from SOGAT (Division 1). Initially, these arrangements were sanctioned by the three unions, and in January 1965, personnel levels were established, stipulating four assistants, which would escalate to seven with the utilisation of two files. The Co-operative Press could not coordinate combined meetings with all the unions involved, and when a stalemate occurred at the branch level, the disagreement was escalated to the national level. The ASLP persisted in dismissing the notion that SOGAT members should execute their customary responsibilities on the web-offset presses, which they typically performed on the rotary letterpress machine at the Co-operative Press. On 24 February 1966, management notified the ASLP and the NGA that the press will commence operations under locally approved circumstances, without prejudice to any potential national agreement. The equipment remained inactive as SOGAT declined to accept this arrangement. The corporation notified the BFMP of the dispute, which recommended referring the issue to a Joint Conciliation Committee of the Joint Industrial Council. The ASLP and the NGA notified the P&KTF that they would abstain from attending any meeting if SOGAT were present, as this would effectively acknowledge SOGAT's assertions. Despite the resumption of negotiations, a resolution had not been achieved by the time the Cameron Committee commenced its hearings. In July 1966, all parties ultimately consented to an arrangement, and the machine commenced functioning.

In The World Co-operative Movement (1965), the Co-operative Press and the Co-operative Printing Society are listed together amongst "the old established federal societies."

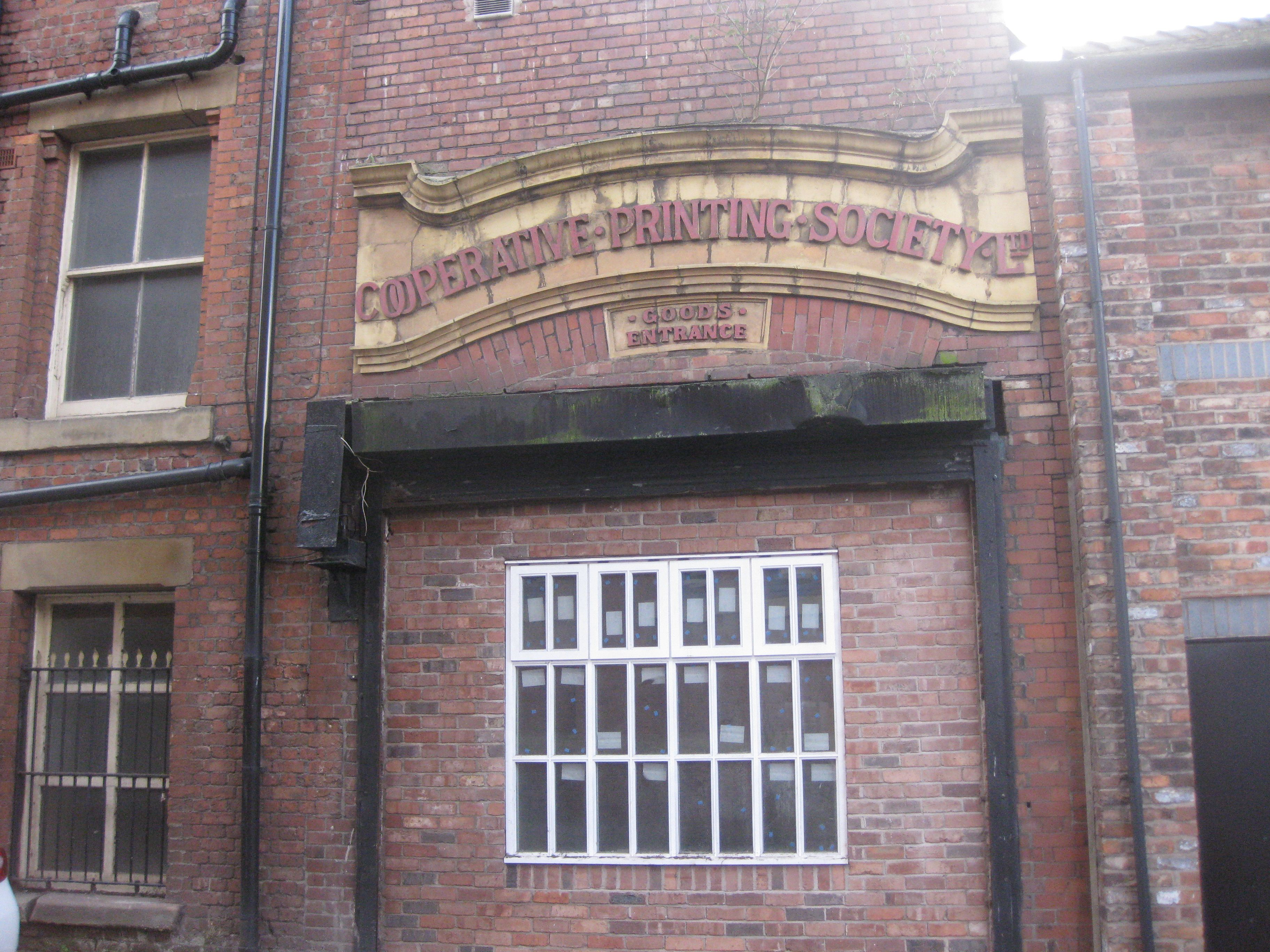
The Co-operative Printing Society merged into the Co-operative Press in 1972

In 1971 the Society took over the co-operative Birmingham Printers, and in 1972 merged with the Co-operative Printing Society. As of 1972, it had a premises in Newcastle. Both the Co-operative Group and Co-operatives UK possess representation on the board. Individual co-ops such as the Central England Co-op, the Midcounties Co-op, and the Scotmid Co-op have also possessed board representation. It is the world's oldest news outlet of the co-operative sector. The Press is a member of the Co-op Group. In 2019, the Co-operative Press carried out a comprehensive strategic review, partly funded by the Co-op Group, which highlighted what they determined as the need to broaden its revenue streams, enhance its digital services for members, and expand its international base. In 2020, the Co-op Group announced that it would cease the provision of "unrestricted" funding to the Press from 2021.

== Publications ==
=== Co-op News ===
Co-op News is a monthly news magazine and website for the global co-operative movement. First published in 1871 as The Co-operative News, it is the world's oldest co-operative newspaper. As per a feature by the Co-operatives Unit of the International Labour Organisation (ILO), over half of its readers are based outside of the UK.

=== The Hub ===
In 2011, the International Co-operative Alliance announced that a multi-lingual news service called The Hub had been launched, administered by the Co-operative Press.

=== Reynold's News ===
In 1921, the society acquired the popular and radical Sunday paper, the Reynold's Illustrated News. The acquisition cost an estimated £300,000. In 1936 the paper was renamed the Reynold's News, and was relaunched in 1962 as a tabloid, titled The Sunday Citizen. Declining sales led to the decision to cease publication in 1967.

=== Millgate Monthly ===
First published in 1905, the Millgate Monthly was a cultural magazine containing articles written by co-operators on social issues, alongside poetry and reviews. It changed its name to simply The Millgate in 1928, and ceased publication in 1953.

=== Books ===
The Press also publishes books related to the co-operative movement. In the 21st century, these have included The Fall of the Ethical Bank: The Inside Story of the Co-operative Bank Disaster by Paul Gosling (2018), and Co-operatives: Linking Practice and Theory by Ian Adderley (2025).

=== Other publications ===
Historically, the Press also published other periodicals, such as 'The Scottish Co-operator' (weekly), 'Co-operative Youth' (monthly), 'Our Circle' (monthly) and 'Sunshine Stories' (monthly).

== See also ==
- Co-op News
- Reynold's News
