= Alice Acland =

Alice Acland may refer to:

- Alice Acland (social activist) (1849–1935), British social activist
- Alice Acland (novelist) (1912–1982), pseudonym of British socialite and author Anne Wignall
