= Jane Clapperton =

British philosopher, birth control pioneer, social reformer and suffragist

- Born: Jane Hume Clapperton; 22 September 1832; Edinburgh, Scotland
- Died: 30 September 1914 (aged 82); Edinburgh, Scotland
- Occupations: Philosopher, social reformer and suffragist
- Parent(s): Alexander Clapperton and Anne Clapperton (née Hume)
- Relatives: Lettice Floyd (niece)

Jane Hume Clapperton (22 September 1832 – 30 September 1914) was a British philosopher, birth control pioneer, socialist, social reformer and suffragist.

== Life ==
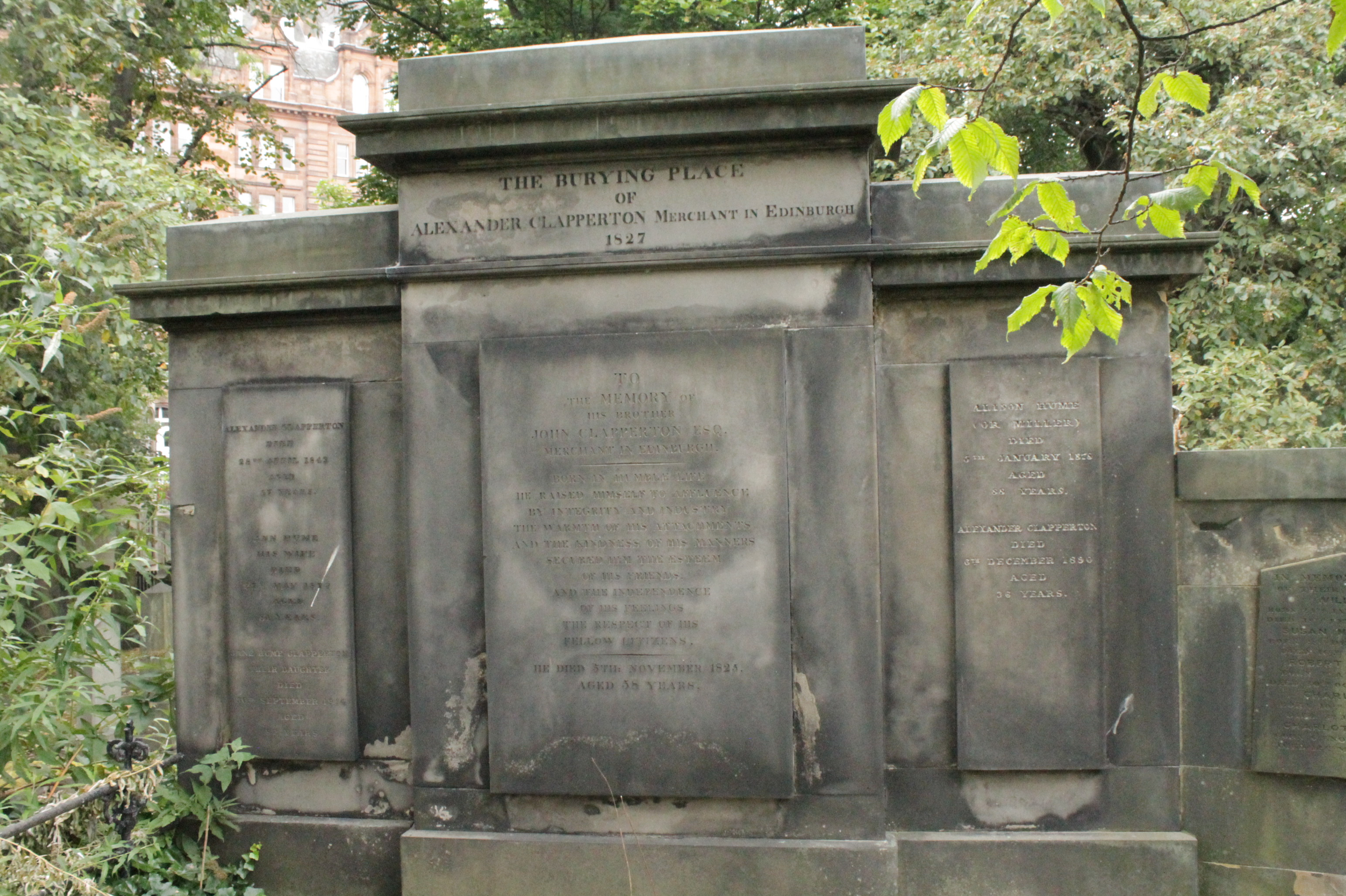
The grave of Jane Hume Clapperton, St Cuthbert's Churchyard, Edinburgh

Her father was Alexander Clapperton (d. 1849) and mother Anne Clapperton (née Hume) (d. 1872). She had eleven siblings. Her father ran a company, Clapperton & Co., in Edinburgh and moved from 43 Lauriston Place, close to George Heriot's School, to 126 George Street in the year Jane was born.

Her father was a Liberal-minded business man who had his children home educated, although Jane was sent to an English boarding school when she was 12 years old, due to her frail health. Prior to her father's death, her brother, John Clapperton, took over the family firm (based at 371 High Street on the Royal Mile) and the fanily had moved to 128 Princes Street in a house facing Edinburgh Castle.

On returning home, she did charitable work while remaining a spinster at home with her mother after her father died and siblings married, and became an active suffragist when she joined the Edinburgh Women's Suffrage Society in 1871, subscribed to the Women's Social and Political Union in 1907, and was a member of the Women's Freedom League in 1908.

She is thought to be the "Miss Clapperton" living at 35 Drummond Place in the New Town of Edinburgh in 1911. She is buried with her family in St Cuthbert's Churchyard at the west end of Princes Street. The grave lies in the raised area to the south-west of the church.

Her niece was the leading suffragette Lettice Floyd, known for her openly queer relationship with fellow suffragette Annie Williams. Clapperton's writing was on a philosophy of evolution of humanity and its happiness being related to ethical behaviour which she associated with full sexual freedom, and equality for women - in the home, the workplace and wider society, and she advocated social inclusion and poverty eradication.

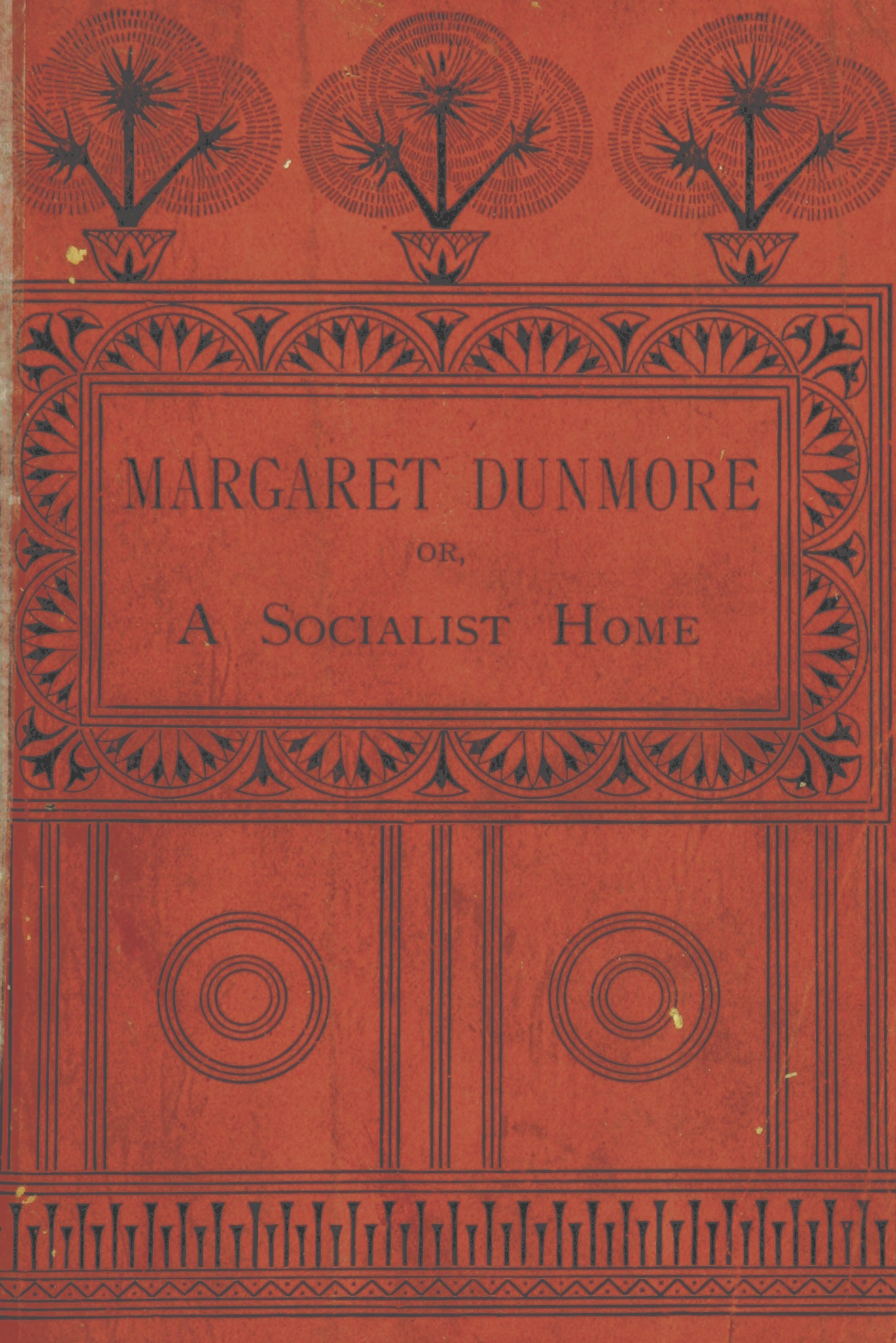
Margaret Dunmore: or, A Socialist Home by Clapperton

More specifically, Clapperton wrote that through controlling and differentiating the thoughts, feelings and senses, people gain self knowledge and self discipline to meet the community's needs.

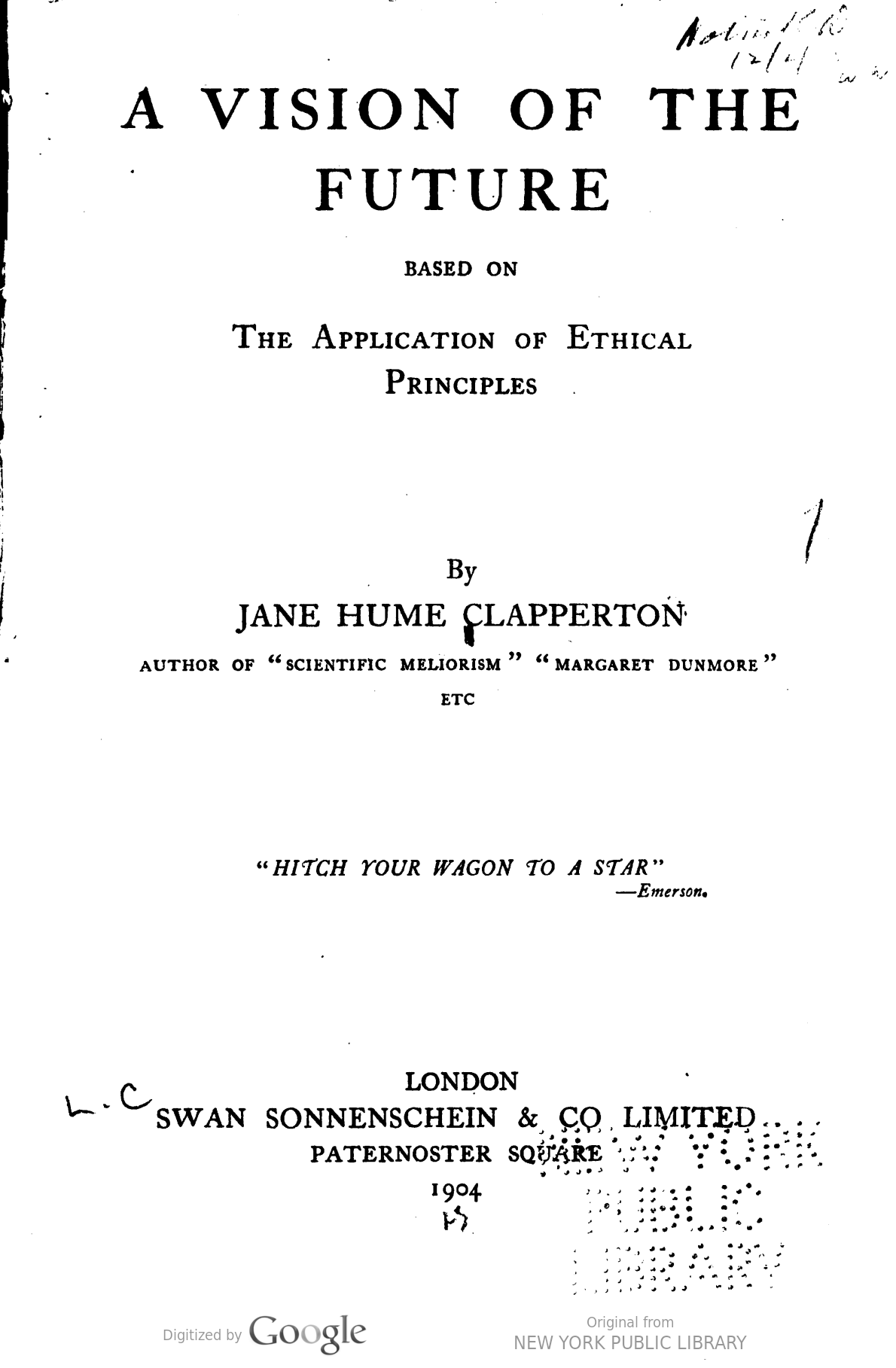
The Vision of the Future based on the Application of Ethical Principles

== Publications ==
- Scientific Meliorism and the Evolution of Happiness (1885)
- Margaret Dunmore: or A Socialist Home (1888)
- A vision of the future : based on the application of ethical principles (1904)
