= Danish Crown =

Danish Crown may refer to several things.

- Danish krone, the currency used in Denmark
- The monarchy of Denmark
- Danish Crown Regalia, symbols of the Danish monarchy
- Danish Crown (company), a large meat processing company
