= Danish Bacon =

Brand under which Danish bacon was sold in the United Kingdom

The logo for Danish Bacon

Danish Bacon is a brand under which Danish bacon is sold in the United Kingdom. The product has "Danish" stamped on the rind between wavy lines. The Danish farmers producing Danish Bacon and their co-operatives were represented by Danske Slagterier, whose UK subsidiary was the Danish Bacon and Meat Council. Danske Slagterier was absorbed into a Danish agricultural umbrella organisation in 2009. The majority of Danish bacon is produced through the farmer-owned co-operative Danish Crown. The co-operative system has low costs because of the scale (25 million pigs per year) and the elimination of the need for markets. Most of the production is for export.

Danish pig exports started to the UK in the mid-19th century when exporting to Germany became difficult and have grown ever since despite attempts by UK domestic producers and other importers to compete. They have not been able to keep pace with Danish modernisation of the curing process and increasing centralisation.

Denmark now concentrates on pig production and has moved bacon curing and packing to other countries. Such bacon is sold as Danish, somewhat controversially, even within Denmark itself. Pigs for the UK market were reared separately to a UK specification, mostly because of UK concerns over pig welfare in Denmark. This separation ceased following the EU-wide phasing out of sow stalls in 2013.

== Organisation and output ==
Most Danish pig farms are members of one of two large farmer-owned co-operatives which account for 95% of pigs slaughtered. The largest of these is Danish Crown, which alone accounts for 90%. All export is through these two co-operatives. A number of smaller slaughterhouses operate outside this system for domestic supply, but none have a licence to export. Costs are high in Denmark and the industry there is highly regulated, but the country has nevertheless developed a competitive advantage through large-scale integrated organisation by its co-operatives. There are no markets or auctions in this system. Prices are set on a weekly basis by a committee of Danske Slagterier, thus making a large saving on transportation costs as there is less need to move animals around.

About 25 million pigs are slaughtered per year, which is 5 pigs for every Dane. Pig production is still increasing. Pig production grew from 17.7 million to 21.4 million in the decade up to 2002 and reached 24.7 million in 2004. Future growth is planned at 2% per year. 75% of this production goes to export.

== History ==
In the 19th century, Denmark's main food export was grain to the UK, but it was outcompeted by the United States and Russia and began to switch to pigs and butter from dairy herds. English Large White pigs were exported to Denmark in the early nineteenth century. From 1840 to 1870 grain was almost half of Denmark's exports, but by 1900 this had fallen to under 3 per cent. Denmark exported bacon to the United Kingdom from at least 1847, when flitches of bacon were specially prepared for the English market, but had no large-scale production until 1864, when the Second Schleswig War made export of live pigs to Hamburg, where up to then they had been slaughtered and cured, impossible and Denmark was forced to do this locally. However, export to the UK only became significant after Germany, to whom Denmark had been exporting since the Middle Ages, erected trade barriers to (1879), and finally banned (1887), the import of live pigs. The lost German market amounted to almost 300,000 pigs per year and Denmark desperately needed to find a new market. The Danish imports were welcomed in the UK; the growth in population following the Industrial Revolution meant that the country was no longer self-sufficient in food, but there was an increasing demand from a more affluent working class. The pig population grew from 442,441 in 1871 to nearly 2.5 million in 1914.

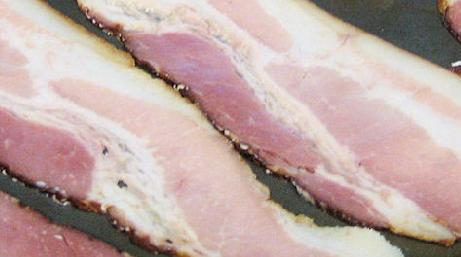
Danish bacon cooking

At the time, British workers on average pay consumed bacon two to three times a week, and bacon and eggs became the traditional British breakfast. This had previously been quite unaffordable for the working class. By the end of the 19th century, 90% of Danish pig exports went to the UK and accounted for 20% of total Danish exports. This made Denmark the main supplier to the UK, replacing the U.S. which previously held that position. Danish Bacon still had more than 25% of the UK market in the 1980s.

=== The co-operatives ===
The first Danish farmer-owned co-operative bacon factory was established in 1887. There were soon more, and by 1897 there were dozens. By 1900 the co-operatives outnumbered private enterprises. By this time the export of live pigs had almost ceased, being replaced by export of pork and bacon. There followed intense competition between the co-operatives and private producers, with the co-operatives eventually winning out. The co-operatives had competition from foreign investors as well as indigenous enterprises. The first of these was I. D. Koopmann of Hamburg, who bought and opened new bacon factories in order to get around the German ban on live pigs. Koopmann refused to do business with the co-operatives, calling the movement "a sick idea". They worked closely with Denny & Co. of London—the Denny family were a major bacon manufacturer in Ireland and between them they controlled a large portion of the UK market.

Denny's took over Koopmann's when the latter got into debt in 1894. Denny's never managed to get on top of the co-operatives, but they held on in Denmark until 1968 when they finally sold what was left of the Danish operation to the Federation of Danish Co-operatives. One co-operative group and another major foreign player, was a competitor of the Danish co-operatives. This was the English Co-operative Wholesale Society (CWS). The CWS had depots in Denmark from 1881, taking advantage of the refusal of London dealers to buy from the co-operatives. From 1899, however, they started setting up their own manufacturing in Denmark. Production grew until 1930 but then slowly declined and CWS started selling up in 1971.

The Danish Bacon brand first made an appearance in the UK when the Danish Bacon Agency Limited (later, the Danish Bacon Company, now a brand of Danish Crown) was set up in the Port of London by the cooperatives in 1902 to handle exports to the UK. The Federation of Danish Co-operative Bacon Factories (De samvirkende danske Andels-Svineslagterier, from 1932 just Danske Slagterier) was formed in 1897, known in the UK as the Danish Bacon and Meat Council. The latter was responsible for UK marketing activities and promoted the Danish Bacon brand. From 1908 Danish law insisted that meat exports be slaughtered in public slaughterhouses. Bacon was also inspected at Esbjerg and stamped to indicate disease free status and the number of the slaughterhouse. After 1908 it was declared free of all preservatives apart from salt and smoking.

Danske Slagterier was absorbed into the Danish umbrella organisation for agricultural producers and food processors (Landbrug & Fødevarer) in 2009 and ceased to exist as a separate organisation. Through a series of mergers and takeovers Danish Crown became the largest co-operative, and by 2000 controlled the vast majority of Danish slaughterhouses.

=== World wars ===
Danish bacon exports to the UK were interrupted during both world wars. During World War One the cause was the shortage of imported cereals with which to feed the pigs. In World War Two Danish ships supplying Britain had their cargo confiscated by the Germans or were even sunk. 6,500 tonnes of bacon were lost in this way. The occupation of Denmark by the Germans in 1940 put a stop to exporting to Britain altogether.

=== Trade relations ===
Attempts were made to modernise British bacon production along Danish lines in the 1930s, but this was not altogether successful at displacing Danish bacon, despite trade restrictions being imposed. Danish bacon remained a major item of discussion in trade negotiations between the two countries and complaints about the disjointedness of British bacon production compared to that from Denmark were still taking place in Parliament in the 1950s. Danish bacon established a reputation in Britain; the mildly cured taste was preferred to the heavily salted and borax-laden bacon imports from the US. Attempts by other countries, such as Canada, to establish bacon imports into Britain during this period used Danish bacon as the quality standard against which their product was judged.

== Modernisation ==
Production methods moved from the traditional dry-curing process of rubbing salt, spices and sugar into the bacon to the less labour-intensive wet-curing process in which the bacon is left to soak in brine. Wet curing can also be used to increase the water content of the meat to add bulk and to add sodium nitrate and phosphates to shorten the process, which can then take as little as six hours compared to 2–3 days for dry curing.

There has been a growing movement by the co-operatives to centralise the slaughterhouse and bacon processing plants into ever larger establishments. The plants have been moved out of Denmark to more economically advantageous locations and this has partially happened to the slaughterhouses too, leaving Denmark to concentrate on just the raising of the pigs. In the 1960s, vacuum packing and automated slicing were introduced, which were carried out in plants in the UK. In the 1970s, mixed farms were still common, but farms then became more specialised in pig rearing and the process more industrialised. The number of farmer-owned co-operatives fell from 62 in 1962 to just two today.

== Denmark imports bacon ==
In 2001, 5% of bacon consumed in Denmark was imported. During 2004 and 2005, bacon production was moved to Germany and especially Poland, where costs are lower. This almost immediately resulted in imports climbing to 75% and the price falling to one-third of Danish-produced bacon. However, the product is still marketed as Danish bacon, since it is produced from Danish pigs. In Danish shops, it is not possible to buy conventionally produced Danish sliced bacon that has been sliced in Denmark. Danish consumers have expressed unhappiness with what they perceive to be a deceptive practice. In the UK, slicing and packaging of Danish bacon continues to be carried out in UK plants owned by Danish Crown.

== The UK pig ==
A specific system is in place to produce pigs for the UK market and these are referred to as UK pigs. The specification for these pigs is not only determined by UK legislation but also by conditions set by the UK supermarkets who are the main customers. Similar schemes are in operation to produce pigs for other markets, such as organic pigs raised to EU Council regulations.

The UK pig system was introduced following a call in the late 1990s by William Hague, the leader of the British Conservative Party (at the time in opposition) to ban Danish bacon. Hague claimed that the "sow stall" system used in Denmark put British pig farmers at a competitive disadvantage since they were not allowed to use this system under British animal welfare regulations. UK supermarkets responded by demanding improved pig welfare conditions, which resulted in the UK pig with sows able to move freely. Danish farmers were paid a supplement to cover the additional cost of rearing UK pigs.

Sow stalls were again criticised by celebrity chef Jamie Oliver in 2009 and the response from the Danish Bacon industry made it clear that they were still in use on some farms, but were all outphased before the EU deadline of 2013.

== Advertising ==
Danish Bacon has been heavily promoted on British television. A 1999 advertisement caused a large number of complaints to be received by the Independent Television Commission. The advert made reference to the 1973 horror movie The Exorcist, a film which itself had been banned on video until that year. The advert "shows a teenage girl sitting on a bed in the midst of a fit. Suddenly her attention is drawn to the smell coming from a pan of frying bacon, and she grimaces as her head rotates 360 degrees suggesting her delight at the smell." It was criticised as tasteless, and since it ran in the daytime as well, many parents complained, leading the commission to prohibit the ad from being shown before 9pm.

== In popular culture ==
In 2007, the Danish Bacon and Meat Council commissioned research at Leeds University into what features make a perfect bacon butty (the researchers refused to use the term sandwich deeming this to be incorrect terminology). Among the findings were that texture and crispiness of the bacon were just as important as taste.

== Bibliography ==
- Coff, Christian; Barling, David; Korthals, Michiel; Nielsen, Thorkild, Ethical Traceability and Communicating Food, Springer, 2008 ISBN 1-4020-8523-0.
- Danish Crown, "125 Years of Food History", retrieved and archived 29 April 2013.
- Gridgeman, N. T. Biological sciences at the National Research Council of Canada: the early years to 1952, Wilfrid Laurier University Press, 1979, ISBN 0-88920-082-3.
- Karantininis, Kostas, "The network form of the cooperative organization—an illustration with the Danish pork industry" in Karantininis, Kostas; Nilsson, Jerker (eds), Vertical Markets and Cooperative Hierarchies: The Role of Cooperatives in the Agri-food Industry, pages 19–34, Springer, 2007 ISBN 1-4020-5543-9.
- National Institute of Economic and Social Research, Trade regulations and commercial policy of the United Kingdom, Cambridge University Press, 1943 OCLC 602912448.
- Sevaldsen, Jørgen; Bjørke, Bo; Bjørn, Claus, Britain and Denmark: political, economic, and cultural relations in the 19th and 20th centuries, Museum Tusculanum Press, 2003 ISBN 87-7289-750-3.
- Strandskov, Jesper, Konkurrence & koncentration, Syddansk universitetsforlag, 2011 ISBN 87-7674-511-2 (in Danish).
- Strandskov, Jesper; Pedersen, Kurt, "Pioneering FDI into the Danish bacon industry: building an agro-industrial diamond", Scandinavian Economic History Review, volume 48, issue 3, 2000.
