= Lettice Floyd =

British suffragette (1865–1934)

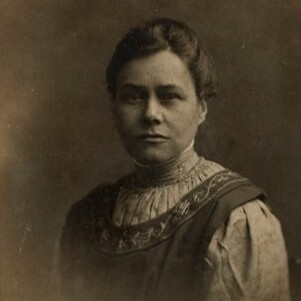
- Floyd in 1895
- Born: November 21, 1865; Berkswell, Warwickshire, England, United Kingdom
- Died: 1934 (aged 68–69); Edgbaston, England, United Kingdom
- Known for: Suffragette
- Partner: Annie Williams

Lettice Annie Floyd (21 November 1865 – 1934) was a British suffragette. She is especially known for her openly lesbian relationship with fellow suffragette Annie Williams. During the suffragette campaign, Floyd and Williams were arrested and force-fed. After World War I, Floyd continued to campaign for women's rights and peace.

== Life ==
Floyd was born in Berkswell, Warwickshire, in 1865, to William and Alison Floyd. Her mother's sister was the philosopher Jane Hume Clapperton, who had published Scientific Meliorism and the Evolution of Happiness in 1885. Their father was a farmer and, when he died in 1879, he left £3000 each to his two daughters. Floyd became bored by not needing to work and, in 1888, she took work in a children's hospital, but was dispirited to realise that the symptoms she was treating were caused by larger problems, including poverty and poor housing. In March 1891 Floyd enrolled in a training post as a Lady Probationer at Nottingham Children's Hospital. After qualifying, she was in charge of the girls' ward and briefly in charge of the busy outpatients department. In 1898 she resigned from the hospital and in 1900 took up a position at Bedales School.

She and her sister felt strongly enough about women's suffrage that they set up a Berkswell outpost of the Birmingham Women's Suffrage Society in 1907. However, by the following year, they had both lost patience with the conventional means of lobbying on the issue and joined the Women's Social and Political Union (WSPU), which was a militant group set up in Manchester by Emmeline and Christabel Pankhurst.

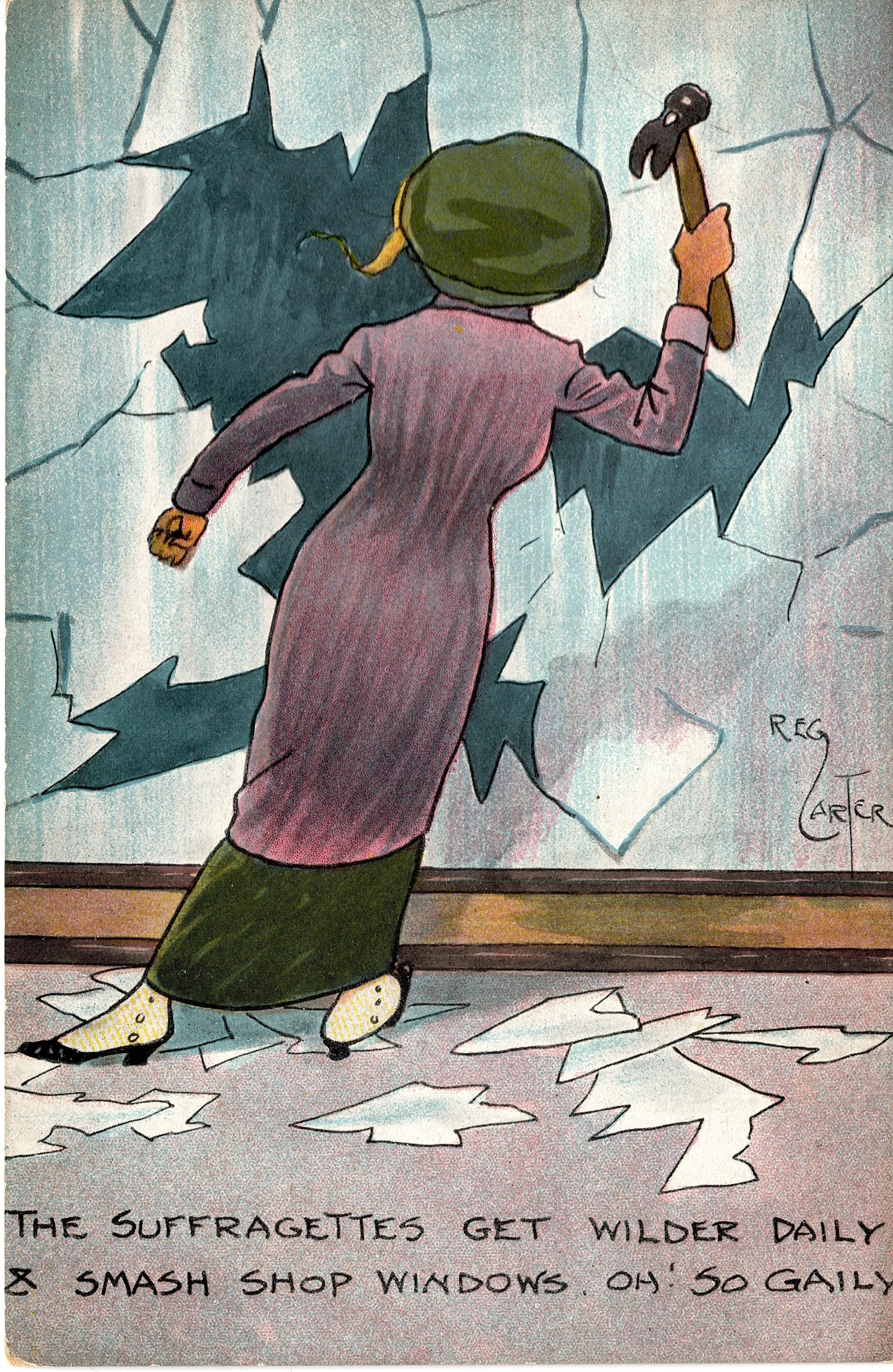
Cartoon of woman in suffragette colours smashing windows

Floyd was made a full-time paid organiser for the WSPU, based either in Bristol or Newcastle, and became romantically involved with another suffragette named Annie Williams. Floyd met Williams in Bristol, where Williams was campaigning for women's suffrage while on holiday from her job as a primary school headteacher in Newquay, Cornwall.

In March 1912, Floyd went to the capital to assist in a WSPU window-smashing campaign, carrying a leather flail which is now in the Museum of London. She was arrested and sent to Holloway Prison where she went on hunger strike, a suffragette tactic to protest against not being treated as political prisoners. Floyd was force-fed by the prison authorities. Floyd had been given a WSPU Hunger Strike Medal "For Valour".

In 1910, Floyd and Williams were based in Newcastle when the Conciliation Bill, which would have included the right of women to vote, had its passage into through parliament stooped by Prime Minister Asquith. The WSPU arranged for 300 protesters to support a deputation to the Prime Minister, led by Emmeline Pankhurst, including Hertha Ayrton, Dr Elizabeth Garrett Anderson, Anne Cobden-Sanderson, and Princess Sophia Duleep Singh. The arrested suffragettes were assaulted and manhandled by the police, but the authorities refused to investigate what became known as Black Friday. Similarly, Floyd was arrested on the day but no charges were brought against her.

Floyd and Williams, along with Emily Davison, were making open air speeches together in Cardiff when Davison left for Aberdeen to assault David Lloyd George. The two stayed there until World War I began, after which the WSPU agreed to a truce with the government. Floyd returned to her home in Berkswell, near Coventry, where Williams lived with her, and they started a branch of the Women's Institute.

In 1918, some women were given the right to vote. Floyd joined the National Council of Women and the Women's International League for Peace and Freedom, noting that women's rights and peace were the most important issues.

Floyd died in 1934, after an operation, with Annie Williams beside her. She bequeathed money to create a nursing home, and left what is now called "Floyd's Field" to the city of Coventry, as a sports facility. Annie died in 1943.
