= Women in cooperatives =

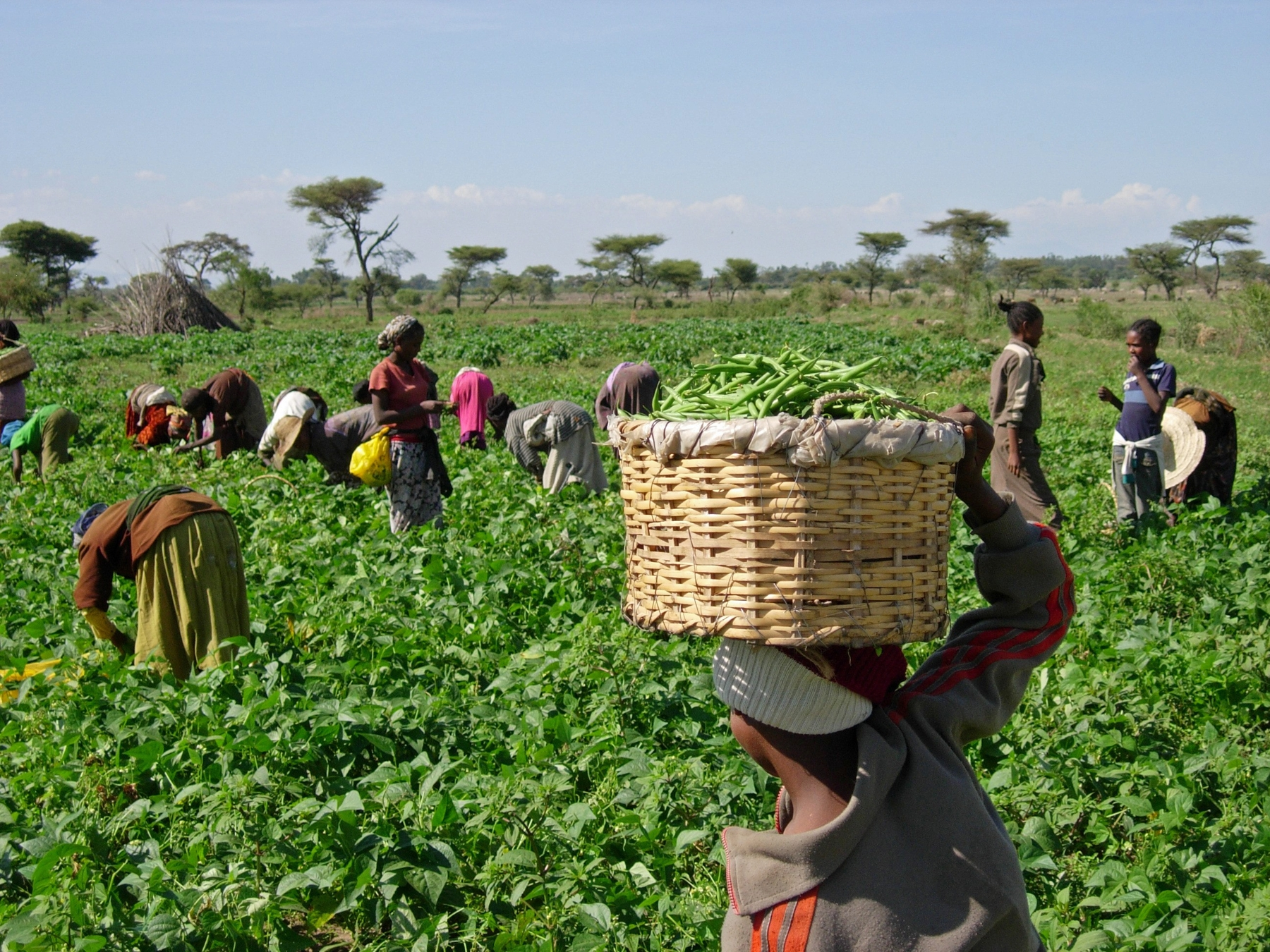
Women and children pick green beans at the Dodicha Vegetable Cooperative in Ethiopia. The beans will be sold to a local exporter, who will sell them to supermarkets in Europe.

A cooperative ("co-op") is an autonomous, people-centred organization grounded in democratic governance and social equity that can serve as a vehicle for women's economic empowerment and inclusion. Cooperatives are based on 6 core values; self-help, democracy, equality, equity, and solidarity. The cooperative model includes non-profit community organizations and businesses that are owned and managed by the people who use their services, such as, consumer cooperatives or worker cooperatives. Co-ops can take on a variety of forms, ranging from officially registered cooperatives to loosely organized groups of neighbours, family, and kin networks. While cooperatives were early adopters in giving women equal voting and membership rights, recent efforts have shifted from focusing on numerical presence to ensuring women have influence over decision-making, finance, and strategic direction.

Women participate in cooperatives across many sectors, including agriculture, care work, and craft and artisan production, allowing them to gain fairer wages, training, access to markets and financial services. Cooperatives and credit cooperatives are often described as a communal alternative or complement to microcredit, and federated models like Self-Employed Women's Association (SEWA), have helped women move from informal economy to the formal economy. More recent areas of activity include efforts to bridge the digital gender divide through platform cooperativism and low technology tools, and the role of women-led cooperatives in environmental sustainability and a just transition.

Despite cooperatives' democratic structures, gender norms and cultural practices contribute to women's disproportionately low representation in cooperative membership around the world, and lower still in leadership and management positions. Women also face barriers such as limited access to land, finance, and education. Since the 1990s, international bodies including the International Cooperative Alliance and the International Labour Organization have promoted gender equality in the cooperative moment. Women's cooperatives, run by and composed entirely of women, may be structured to make participation easier.

== Economic and social empowerment ==
Rachel MacHenry argues that cooperatives have several common features that are particularly beneficial to women, including "ensuring a fair return on work, support for members, safe working conditions, availability of pooled or purchased raw materials, and access to viable markets." Furthermore, she says that they serve as a "crucial link" between Western markets and local kin-based structures in developing countries. In the same collection of essays, Brenda Rosebaum says that a cooperative can go beyond simply providing an income for the poor women members involved or stimulating the larger community in which it is located, cooperatives have "empowered" women, "enhanced their dignity, and greatly improved their quality of life."

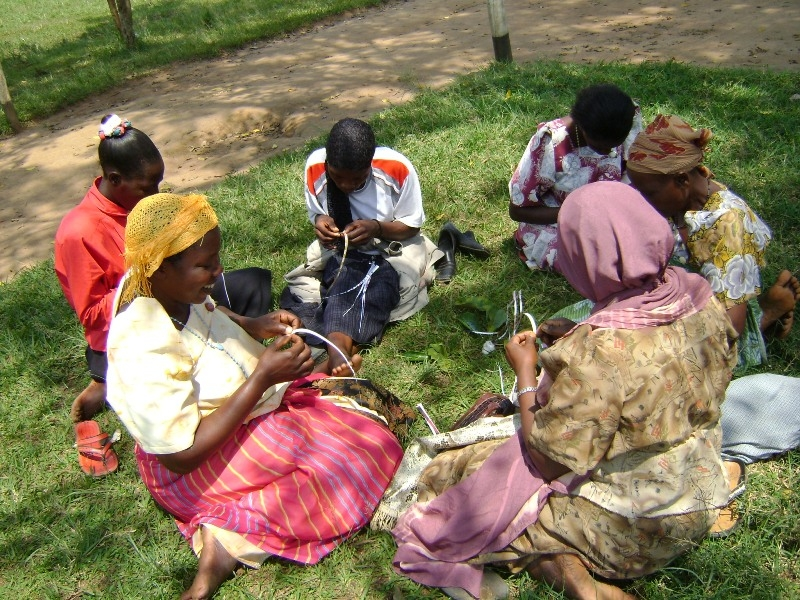
Ugandan women from the Hope Again cooperative socializing as they work making necklaces

In a study of a Nepalese women's cooperative, Rachel MacHenry found that social barriers among women were broken down due to the inclusion of women of different classes, castes, and ethnicities. Moreover, these women often bonded over common experiences and similar motivations for participation in the cooperative. Other shifts occurred in women's independence, including reports of increased physical mobility, including more confidence walking alone as well as riding public transportation. Women also benefited from an increased self-worth and more confidence in interactions with family members and upper class people. Some women weavers felt that they had gained more bargaining power in the eyes of business people who had previously exploited them; other women claimed that they had gained a larger sense of their value and overall contribution to their own households.

Another principal benefits of cooperative work is that it allows women the opportunity to gain a decent wage while still leaving time and freedom for other responsibilities important to them such as caring for children and families. Furthermore, benefits often trickle down to the children of women engaged in cooperatives. In the case of the cooperative UPAVIM in Guatemala, a strong emphasis was placed on savings for children's education.

== Organizational structures ==
Women's cooperatives are often built on ideas of sisterhood, equality, and strength from unity. Consequently, many have rejected hierarchical organizational structures in favor of more democratic participation where every member's input counts equally. Some cooperatives require consensus (instead of compromise or majority approval) for decision-making. Equal participation relies on individuals verbally articulating their opinions to the group; this in itself can be unequal since more experienced and articulate members can dominate discussions. Unlike in profit-oriented organizations, outcomes can be measured in terms of politics and policy, cultural outcomes, mobilization, and self-development.

=== Sectors ===
==== Agricultural sector ====
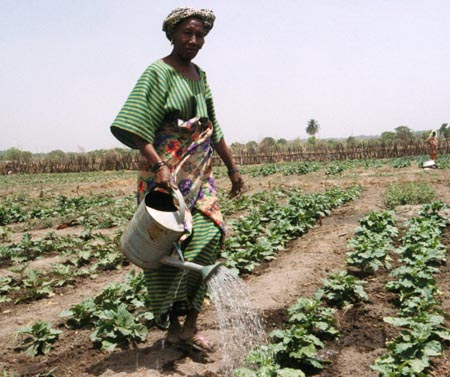
A farmer at the women's agricultural cooperative of Walikaly village in Siguiri Prefecture, Guinea

In Africa, though women account for roughly 80% of food production, they receive less than 10% of credit offered to small-scale farmers and only 7% of agricultural extension services. They own less than 1% of all land. By permitting women farmers to join as a cooperative, individuals are better able to acquire inputs, production services, and marketing for their produce. This enhances productive capacity and opens access to markets that would not be possible for an individual operating alone. Furthermore, there is “solid evidence” that membership in a cooperative enhances productivity, income, and quality of life for the person involved, as well as the greater community.

==== Care work sector ====
Women are over-represented in paid care work the world over, and care work is oftentimes undervalued and underpaid. Those performing it have low levels of collective organization, low bargaining power, inadequate working conditions, as well as low access to business inputs that are needed in the care sector like in any other. Women also have gender-specific health needs regarding reproduction, and "are major (potential) consumers of health and care services, such as maternal health and maternity protection, HIV/AIDS prevention and mitigation, or child or elderly care services."

Cooperatives contribute to a positive change for working women both as providers and recipients of health care services. In Africa, where cooperatively organized care provision has in many cultural contexts been an intrinsic part of the social fabric, it is today gaining visibility, and increasing in the range of services provided and level of formality. For example, the Soweto Home-Based Care Givers Co-operative, which was set up in 2001, provides "nursing care, counseling, hospital transport and food parcel distribution to people living with HIV/AIDS". In other regions of the world, examples abound of women working in the care sector improving their working conditions and accessing much-needed services. For instance, the Self-Employed Women's Association (SEWA) in India runs cooperatively operated childcare centres and maternity benefits via an insurance cooperative as part of a holistic response to the needs of women.

==== Craft and artisan sector ====
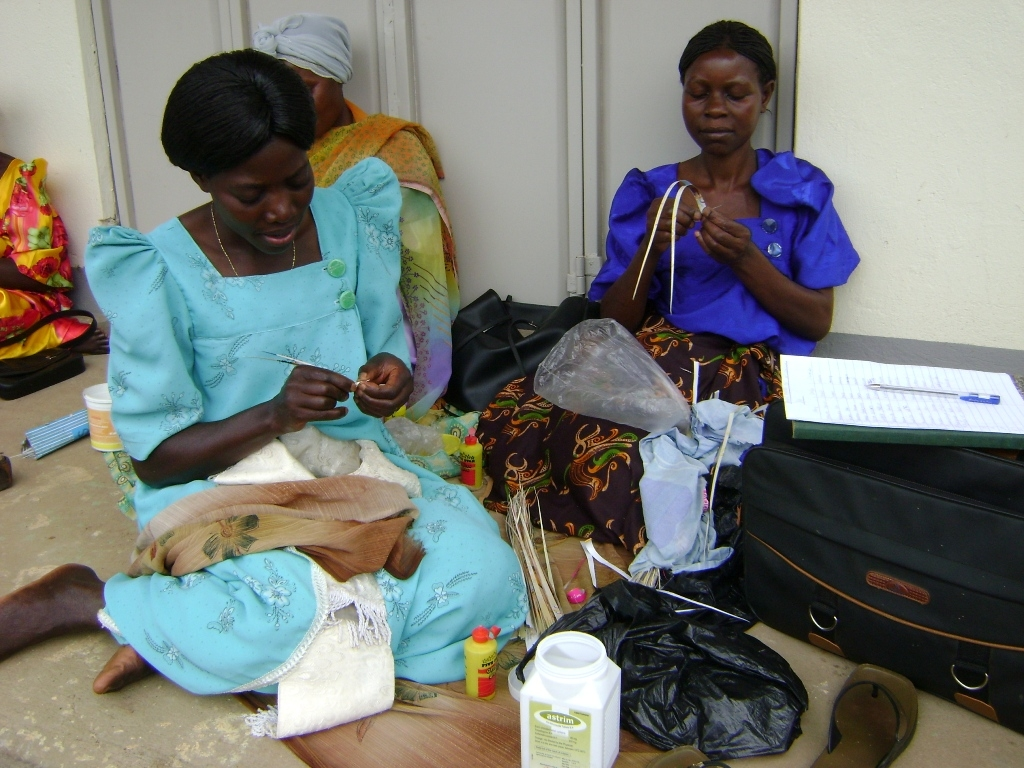
Women in a Ugandan artisan cooperative, Hope Again, making necklaces

By engaging in artisan cooperatives, women can gain new skills and training, access higher quality raw materials, and get paid for finished work directly upon delivery at the cooperative marketplace. In addition, they often have access to benefit programs for cooperative product producers. In a Nepalese textile cooperative, this included such things as, "a savings and loan system, retirement fund, bonus program, girl-child education fund, health services, peer counseling, legal counseling, and a fair price shop." Cooperatives also secure connections with alternative trade organizations (ATOs) that help connect members with buyers, obtain orders, and export the artisan work to markets around the world.

== Global and regional policy frameworks ==
=== Legal constraints ===
A study carried out by the ILO found that cooperative laws are "gender neutral" and do not directly discriminate against women. However, in reality laws intended to protect women are ignored in favor of cultural norms or are maneuvered around. Most legal barriers to women's cooperative membership are largely indirect and written into cooperative bylaws, such as rules that only one member per family can have membership when the cultural norm encourages male membership as a first choice. In agricultural cooperatives, it is often the case that membership requires land ownership, and since women are severely underrepresented in land ownership the world over, this serves to inhibit women from joining.

==== Conflict areas ====
Conflicts are rampant in the Middle East and cooperatives are thus able to make huge strides for women. Participation by women in these areas is especially limited and usually confined to small, women-only cooperatives, mainly because overall number of cooperatives equals less than 1 percent of employment opportunities in the occupied Palestinian territory, Lebanon, and Iraq combined. Women's land ownership and employment rates are also extremely low in these areas, with women holding less than one-fourth of all jobs.

During times of conflict, cooperatives may be most advantageous because they enable members to accumulate savings, pool resources, access credit, and share risks. By combining the power of rural women in conflict states who would have achieved very little by themselves, cooperatives provide a functional tool for empowerment and economic independence, in addition to providing a “long-term sustainable socioeconomic recovery” following conflict.

== Financial inclusion and cooperative banking ==
=== Alternative/complement to microcredit ===
Much controversy surrounds microcredit loans in regards to empowering women, Karim argues, based on a 1999 ethnographic study, that microcredit nongovernmental organizations have too much power over the lives of rural people, which has a particularly detrimental effect on women. Karim highlights the negative tactics often used in loan recovery, in which group responsibility plays a large role and women's honor is publicly shamed if they default. Similarly, after conducting a 2008 study of small women entrepreneurs in Bangladesh, Jahiruddin et al. deduct that microcredit can even worsen poverty of borrowers in certain conditions. One-fourth of cases from a survey, spanning 35 villages and including 320 microcredit borrowers, showed no improvement in economic status of the borrowers, and in 6% of the cases poverty actually worsened due to various reasons like investment in activities that are slow to start generating revenue or encountering emergency circumstances that led to the use of the loan for other purposes.

Cooperatives offer a way out of these negatives situations that microcredit puts women in due to the communal net and support that they provide through rough times. Furthermore, they allow women, who might have been isolated and working individually in the informal economy, to avoid loan defaults because they are able to join with other members to create economies of scale and increase their influence and bargaining power in the market.

==== Financial sector ====
Savings and credit cooperatives (SACCOs) are much more accessible to women than standard banks, especially in rural areas, due to the fact that they are “locality-based,” making them more culturally sensitive and less intimidating. Moreover, they tend to offer a wider range of loan sizes, allowing women to find suitable loan conditions, such as smaller sizes to fit their business, health, or educational needs. Research across the developing nations indecate that the participation financial cooperatives improve the access for women's to savings account for themself, market networrds and microcredits. Thereby there is an increase in their bargaining power and financial independence. An example and prominent insititutional model of member-owned finance is the Self-Employed Women's association (SEWA) cooperative federation in India. SEWA's strcuture provides personally tailored financial products such as micro-insurance & ffinancial literacy training specifically designed for women who work in the informal economy. They do this by using decentrailized saving groups and cooperative loan structures, memberled federations who help women overcome systemic barriers in informal labor sectors.

== The Digital gender divide ==
The growth of digital labour platforms has generated interest in cooperative models as a means of bridging the digital gender divide and extending economic agency to women in the gig economy.

=== Platform cooperativism ===
Platform cooperativism is a model of social organization based on the principle that it is difficult to considerably change a platform that one does not own. Trebor Scholz has defined it as the use of "communal ownership and democratic governance" to build a "fairer internet and sustainable careers" for workers. For women in the technology sector, platform cooperatives can offer safe spaces and ecosystems that counter the prejudices and sexists practices found in male dominated industries.

Examples of the model include Eva, a Canadian ride-sharing cooperative that allows passengers to select driver-members who are women or non-binary persons. Stocksy United is a multi-stakeholder photography cooperative that provides higher pay through royalty rates between 50% and 75%, significantly above the industry standard.

==== Low technology and "phygital" models ====
To address the needs of informal women workers who may lack high-end, advance hardware or digital literacy, some cooperatives use "low technology" or "phygital", physical plus digital, models. These approaches centre technology on the lived realities of informal women workers rather than treating digitization as a one size fits all solution.

The Self-Employed Women's Association of India (SEWA) has pioneered several interventions. Its Farm2Table initiative uses the messaging application WhatsApp for online collection of demand for groceries, connecting women's groups directly with consumers through a hybrid model that does not require extensive training. Farmer facilitation centres are phygital centres that combine frontline women leaders, known as Agewans, with digital data collection to support rural farmers, allowing women to obtain inputs such as seed or cattle feed within their own villages and thereby reducing "time poverty". In the Philippines, KAYA is a cloud-based platform designed to enable digital payments and financial services for cooperative members, and is largely overseen by boards on which women hold up to 60% of leadership roles.

==== Algorithmic management ====
Algorithmic management refers to the use of automated systems to supervise, evaluate, and assign tasks to workers with minimal human intervention. This practise frequently produces a "black box" in which workers lack visibility into how their performance is rated or why they are dismissed, which can increase stress and uncertainty in employment and conditions. Research indicates that algorithmic management can reinforce broader systemic inequities, as performance and rating algorithms have been shown to embed gender biases.

Cooperatives address these harms through several avenues. Worker data cooperatives use data-portability rights such as those under Article 20 of Gender Data Protection Regulation, to pool worker data for collective audits that help identify systemic biases and wage inconsistencies. Some cooperatives are exploring rights for workers representatives to receive detailed disclosure about, and even to veto, algorithmic systems that directly affect employees. Mandatory auditing initiatives, such as New York City's Local Law, 144, require annual external audits of employment related algorithms specifically to identify potential race and gender biases.

== Environmental sustainability and just transitions ==
A just transition is the process of shifting towards environmentally sustainable economies in a way that is inclusive, reduces inequities, and leaves no one behind. Women-led cooperatives have been described as active agents of change in this shift, and women-owned and women-led enterprises are reported to be more likely than their male-led counterparts to prioritize environmental considerations and social responsibility. This leadership spans sectors ranging from forest conservation to the circular economies built by informal waste pickers. Women are often regarded as stewards of natural and household resources, holding traditional and ecological knowledge important for local climate adaptation. They still face structural barriers, such as unequal access to finance and "time poverty" created by unpaid care work, that limits their resilience to climate risk. Cooperatives help close these gaps by sharing collective knowledge on disaster risk reduction and by facilitating access to green technologies and climate smart inputs.

Examples can be found throughout the world. In Vietnam, the Hoa Le Clean Dragon Fruit Cooperative, whose membership is about 80% women, has adopted environmental and social governance (ESG) practise alongside water and energy saving technologies. In Senegal women's groups in the classified forests of Mbao have restored degraded land and former dumps into productive gardens through agroecology and community led reforestation. Fiji's Bia-i-Cake Women's Cooperative, formed during COVID-19 pandemic, runs sustainable food-security projects, including a tilapia farm and a greenhouse. In Ethiopia, the Oromia Coffee Farmers' Cooperative Union has brought solar energy to women coffee farmers for both agricultural and office tasks. While India's Jharkhand Women Self-Supporting Poultry Cooperative Federation, combines collective procurement and marketing with social protection, such as insurance and edition funds, enabling women to challenge traditional inequalities in rural livelihoods.

== Barriers and persistent challenges ==
=== Traditional role of women ===
In many developing countries there is a "prevalent misconception" that reproductive and domestic roles should be a woman's most important job. When women attempt to add an income-earning job on top of other roles, pressure to uphold the unequal division of labor and care work in the household severely restricts their job choices, even putting them on the outside circle in cooperatives because there is little time left for mandatory meeting attendance and other tasks.

In Latin America, machismo ideology permeates the culture and gives women virtually all the responsibility in child care, domestic work, and other subsistence activities. Furthermore, these domestic obligations inhibit women from accessing jobs that are better paid because they require uninterrupted work for long hours. Brenda Rosenbaum says that, "However hard they work, women at this level of poverty find it difficult to overcome the gender constraints imposed on them." Many women get trapped by pressures and criticism from family members and neighbors that believe the independence cooperatives encourage is "immodest" or too "forward," even to the extent of fathers or husbands forbidding involvement.

=== Access to resources ===
Lack of access to resources inhibits women from creating new cooperatives and affects their roles in existing ones. Because women often lack their own independent assets, it is more difficult for them to invest in cooperatives on their own. Moreover, many women in developing countries suffer a disparity in levels of education, both overall and in relation to men, especially in regards to business experience and knowledge. Women's absence in land ownership on a large scale has also prevented their involvement in many agricultural cooperatives.

Women's lack of access to finance, due to a variety of factors such as absence of collateral and negotiating power, is one of the main barriers to improving the productive capacity of women workers. The large majority of microfinance institutes view rural women as “[ostensibly] a credit risk.” When women are approved for loans, they are often faced with unmanageably high interest rates, averaging 10% per month, which can deplete savings quickly. Although savings and credit cooperatives exist in developing countries to avoid dealing with microfinance institutions and are often the recipients of support services from the government, many are still male-dominated and discourage women from joining. For example, in Kenya, only 3% of women have access to the formal financial sector, as opposed to 44% of men.

Funding and opportunities from government and other institutions may be limited depending on how cooperatives label themselves (“agricultural co-op” versus “women’s co-op,” for example). Women's cooperatives are sometimes dismissed as radical political groups, especially if the organization is new. This was the case for Saheli, a Mumbai-based cooperative for sex workers and victims of sex trafficking.

Woman who work in agricultural and artisan cooperatives have a limited access and value chain integration compared to woman working in other cooperative sectors. This is highlighted in the study "Empowrering women through agricultural cooperatives: A multilevel analysis in Morocco's marrakech-Safe region" An example is that women here have a limited access to transportation, cold storage & direct market distribution networks. This leaves many women reliant on intermediaries resulting in reduced profit margins for them.

== Best practises and future direction ==
=== International level ===
Since the early 1990s the promotion of gender equality has been a focus of the international cooperative movement. In 1995, the International Cooperative Alliance (ICA) passed a resolution called "Gender Equality in Cooperatives" in which gender equality was named a global priority by members. The ICA has also been involved in the development of training materials on gender and cooperatives in various languages including French, English and Spanish, as well as leadership development manuals made especially for women in cooperatives.

In 2002, the International Labour Organization (ILO) released Recommendation No. 193 on the Promotion of Cooperatives Recommendation that explicitly states: "special consideration should be given to increasing women's participation in the cooperative movement at all levels, particularly at management and leadership level". Despite this and all of the benefits to women, as a reflection of larger society, women tend to be shut out of leadership and decision-making positions in mixed-gender cooperatives, and often do not benefit to the same extent as their male counterparts.

The United Nations General Assembly declared 2012 as the International Year of Cooperatives (IYC) in hopes of spotlighting the contribution of cooperatives to economic development and social development, especially their effects on "poverty reduction, employment generation, and social integration."

=== Cooperative level ===
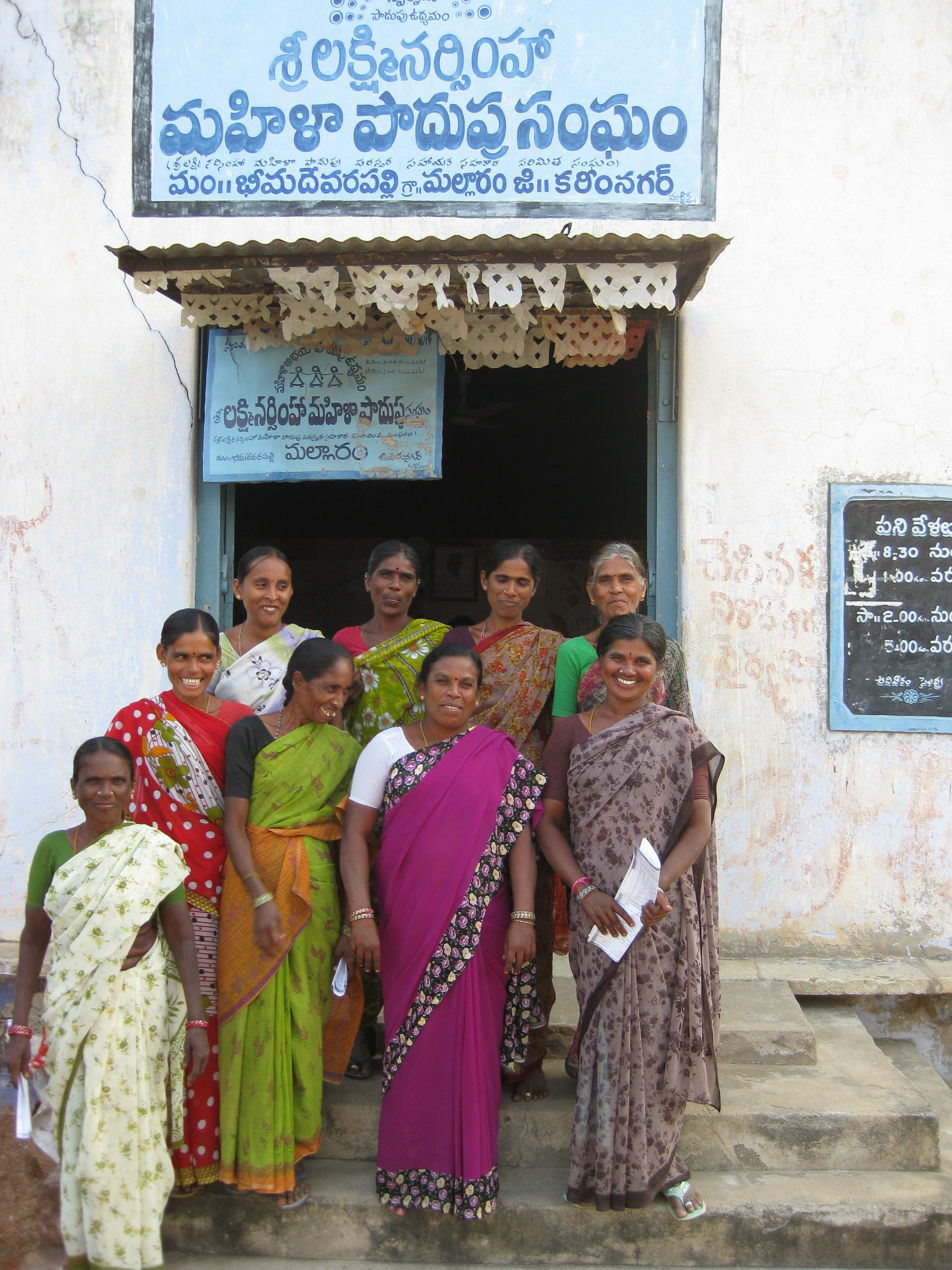
Board members stand in front of their 'thrift cooperative' in Mulukanoor, Andhra Pradesh.

A. Nippierd argues that on a more micro or local level, sensitizing managers and leaders of cooperatives to gender issues is a key starting point towards increasing gender equality. It is only with a full understanding of the issues and a strong decision to methodically address them that proactive measures begin to be enforced. This essential step should be partnered with other legal means such as "mainstreaming" gender equality into all cooperative policies, bylaws, statements, initiatives, and programs, etc. Gender analysis can also be utilized to pinpoint problem areas in policy or culture.

Capacity-building of individual women should also be a focus for improving gender equality in cooperatives, especially due to the education gap and subsequent occupation gap commonly suffered by women in many developing countries. Special care should be taken to ensure that women represent an equal proportion in training and educational programs. Furthermore, these programs should be particularly sensitive to the needs of women, even going to the extent of specific designs where necessary, and should also include confidence-building measures.

Identifying women as potential leaders and encouraging and supporting them through advanced training, mentoring, and coaching has also been identified as a successful policy. In countries where women are particularly disadvantaged under the laws, Nippierd argues that cooperatives should join in "national coalitions and alliances with gender advocacy organizations and other civil society organizations to lobby governments for equal rights (especially in property and asset ownership) and an effective legal framework and institutions that foster gender equality."

== See also ==
- Cooperative economics
- History of the cooperative movement
- List of cooperatives
- Microfinance / microcredit
- Participatory economics
- Social enterprise
