= Mary Lawrenson =

- Born: Mary Ann Molyneux; 23 March 1850; Marylebone, Middlesex, England
- Died: 1 January 1943 (aged 92); Brighton, Sussex, England
- Occupations: Teacher; Co-operative organiser
- Movement: Co-operative; Women's
- Spouse: John Marcus Lawrenson (m. 1876)
- Children: 1

Mary Ann Lawrenson (née Molyneux; 23 March 1850 – 1 January 1943) was an English activist in the co-operative movement and an educationalist. A co-founder of the Co-operative Women's Guild, she served as its general secretary from 1885 to 1889. She was also the first woman represented on the board of the Co-operative Union.

== Biography ==
Born 23 March 1850 in Marylebone, Middlesex, England (now part of central London) to John Molyneux and Ellen Molyneux (née Keys), she was the eldest of 11 children. Her father was a printer, co-operator and trade unionist. Like her father, Lawrenson was a follower of both Christian Socialism and Roman Catholicism. From 1869 she taught English in schools, and spent some time teaching in Paris.

In 1876 she married John Marcus Lawrenson, a government clerk and fellow co-operator, with whom she had a son.

Lawrenson played a key role in the establishment of the Co-operative Women's Guild, following an appeal by Alice Acland, with whom Lawrenson had previously met, in her column in the Co-operative News. Lawrenson advocated for a national organisation with local branches to support women in the co-operative movement and to promote the education of women and girls through instructional and recreational classes. Founded initially as the Women's League for the Spread of Co-operation, the organisation held its first formal meeting of 50 women at the 1883 Co-operative Congress, and was soon after renamed the Co-operative Women's Guild. Lawrensen founded one of the first Guild branches in Woolwich in 1883 and joined the national Guild committee in 1884.

In 1884 she was also elected along with a friend, to the education committee of the Royal Arsenal Co-operative Society (RACS), becoming the first women nationally to be elected to a co-operative educational committee. She faced resistance from men on the committee, while others supported women's involvement in educational committees if it meant they didn't try to run for management committee positions. However, she was soon followed nationally by other women gaining election to co-operative educational committees, though they struggled in securing funding from their co-operatives for educational activities.

During this period she organised classes for women and children. However she found herself at odds with others in the movement locally who placed more emphasis on the labour and suffrage movements and she subsequently resigned as secretary of the Woolwich Guild in 1885 and from the RACS education committee in 1888.

In 1885 Lawrenson succeeded Acland as general secretary of the Guild, working across the country to support the establishment of local branches during a period of rapid growth. In 1889 she was replaced as general secretary by Margaret Llewelyn Davies, in part because of her support for co-operative production through co-operative workshops and labour co-partnerships, as opposed to the dominant focus on consumer co-operation. In 1893 she also lost her place on the Guild's national committee.

In 1905 she moved to Bournemouth and was active in the Guild locally. However, following her husband's death in the First World War, she ceased being active in the co-operative movement, though she was honoured as part of the Guild's 50th anniversary celebrations in 1933.

She later moved to Brighton where she died on 1 January 1943 (aged 92) following an extended period of poor health.

Non-profit organization positions
Preceded by Alice Acland	Secretary of the Women's Co-operative Guild; 1885–1889	Succeeded by Margaret Llewelyn Davies
