= Annie Williams (suffragette) =

English suffragette (c. 1860–1943)

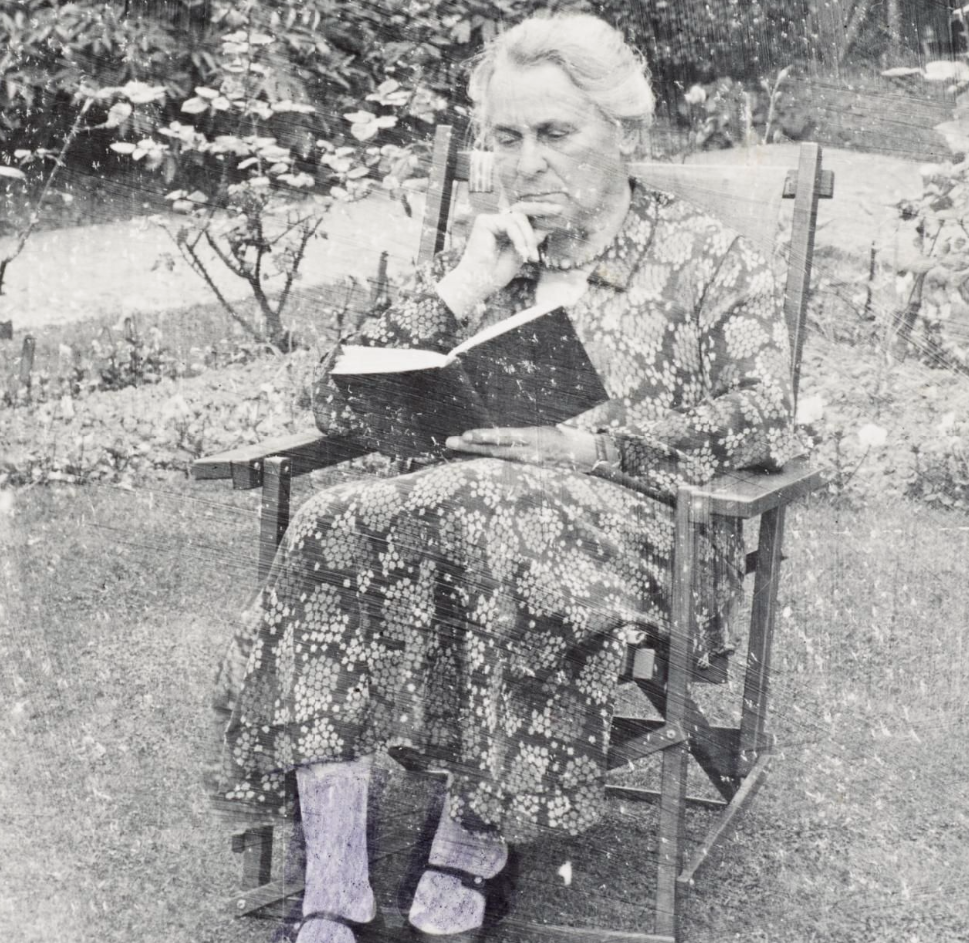
- Williams in 1943
- Born: c. 1860
- Died: 1943; Birmingham, England
- Occupations: Elementary school headteacher; WSPU branch organiser
- Employer: Women's Social and Political Union (WSPU)
- Known for: Suffragette activism
- Partner: Lettice Floyd
- Honours: Hunger Strike Medal

Annie Williams (c. 1860–1943) was a British suffragette, organiser for the Women's Social and Political Union (WSPU), imprisoned twice and awarded a Hunger Strike Medal. She was involved in a same-sex partnership with fellow activist Lettice Floyd, but not allowed to write to her in prison.

== Life ==
Annie Williams, described as Cornish, taught in local authority schools, becoming a headmistress at Crantock Public Elementary School in Newquay, before joining the Women's Social and Political Union (WSPU) in 1907. In 1908, Williams spent her school summer break working for the organisation in Bristol and met Lettice Floyd. At the start of the 1908 school term, Williams returned to teaching in Cornwall, but attended a WSPU "At Home" gathering in Plymouth in November. On 14 May 1909, Williams had a poem in the newspaper Votes for Women. At the end of that semester, she stopped teaching and became a full-time WSPU organiser.

Williams's sister Edith also joined the WSPU and later took over the Cornwall branch in 1913; Williams's mailing address was care of her sister at Glanafon, Devoran, Cornwall.

Williams's relationship with Lettice Floyd lasted until the latter's death and Williams inherited £3000 and a £300 annuity.

== Suffrage activism ==
On 29 June 1909, Williams was part of the protest at the House of Commons, was arrested and subsequently released. In August, she was speaking for WSPU at Canford Park, Dorset, when attacked by the mob. From 1910 to 1911, Williams was in Newcastle organising for the by-election campaign, Lettice Floyd moved up from the Midlands to be with her. Williams opened a WSPU shop in February 1910 at 77 Blackett Street, Newcastle, and she spoke at events for the Co-operative Women's Guild and noted that in Newcastle "Co-operative women are very keen to know about 'Votes for Women'". Williams was then replaced by Laura Ainsworth and moved on to be WPSU organiser for Huddersfield and Halifax before in 1912 and 1913 becoming WSPU Wales organiser, based at 27 Charles Street, Cardiff. Williams and others organised various holiday campaigns in seaside resorts and other areas, such as the Rhondda, which Williams described as "a unique opportunity for coming into touch with the typical Welsh collier and his surroundings". These trips also allowed Williams "time for hill climbing, for enjoying the wide views of hill and dale, and for drinking in life-giving air". Williams wrote "historic Tonypandy" could not "object to militant methods!"—referring to the miners' riots there earlier in 1911.

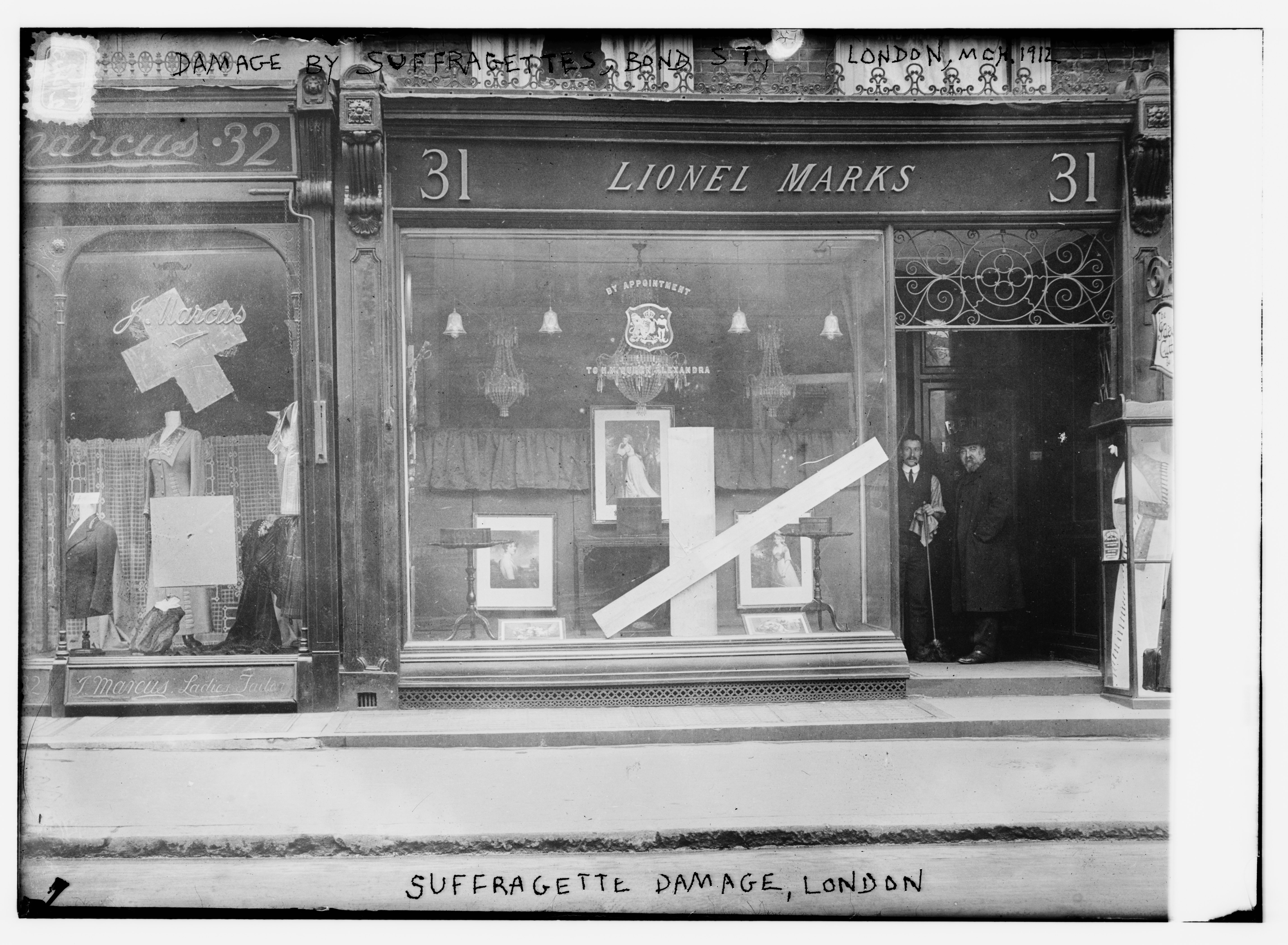
Shop window smashed by suffragettes

In March 1912, with Lettice Floyd, Williams was one of the 200 or more WSPU members organised to be smashing windows, as Parliament was considering (and rejected) the Conciliation Bill (to give some women the vote), and was sentenced to one month in Holloway prison.

Williams and Lettice Floyd took part in the hunger strike and both were forcibly fed. Williams and Lettice Floyd were among the 100 suffragettes who were honoured, awarded the WSPU Hunger Strike Medal, "for Valour"

Up to November 1912, Emily Davison had been helping Lettice Floyd and Williams at their open air meetings before travelling by train to Aberdeen to accost the Prime Minister Lloyd-George.

In January 1914, Williams visited Christabel Pankhurst, who was in self-imposed exile in Paris. In July 1914, Williams spoke in Batheaston, near Bristol, at a WSPU garden party for the Tollemache sisters.

== Relationship and later life ==
The same-sex relationship between Williams and Lettice Floyd was open, and lasted from 1908 to the latter's death in 1934. In November 1908, Williams wrote from Cranlock, Newquay, to Lettice Floyd, who was then serving a sentence in Holloway Prison, London, but the letter was returned as the prison governor said she was "not entitled" to receive it.

At the start of World War One, when the suffragettes called off their activism campaign, Williams and Lettice Floyd moved from Cardiff to Berkswell, near Coventry, and their relationship continued. In 1920 they helped start the Women's Institute there. Williams was president of the institute 1926–30 and 1933–34. She was at Lettice Floyd's side when she died in hospital in Birmingham after surgery in 1934. Williams inherited from Lettice Floyd's will £3000 and annual income of £300. Williams died in 1943.
