= Initiative 136 =

Initiative 136 is a citizen's movement in Thessaloniki, Greece, which was organized in 2011 in opposition to privatization of Thessaloniki's public water and sewage company, EYATH.

== New water services management ==
The movement proposes a new type of water services management that is neither state-run nor private, but rather operates on the principles of cooperativism and conceives water as a commons. At the heart of the Initiative's plan is the creation of local water cooperatives in all of the metropolitan area's municipalities and districts. The cooperatives will allow participation of water users in decision making regarding water tariffs and investment, under the principle of "one water meter equals one vote".

== Union of cooperatives ==
The union of all the cooperatives will constitute a new company that, according to its statute, will have the goal of managing Thessaloniki's water services in a non-profit manner and ensure water quality, direct democratic control, social justice, access to water for all and protection of the environment. The union of cooperatives will participate in the public tender for the acquisition of EYATH announced by the Greek government for 2013.

== European Water Movement ==
Initiative 136 is a member of the European Water Movement and endorses the European Citizens' Initiative for the Right to Water.
