= History of the cooperative movement =

History of the type of autonomous association

The history of the cooperative movement concerns the origins and history of cooperatives across the world. Although cooperative arrangements, such as mutual insurance, and principles of cooperation existed long before, the cooperative movement began with the application of cooperative principles to business organization.

== Beginnings ==
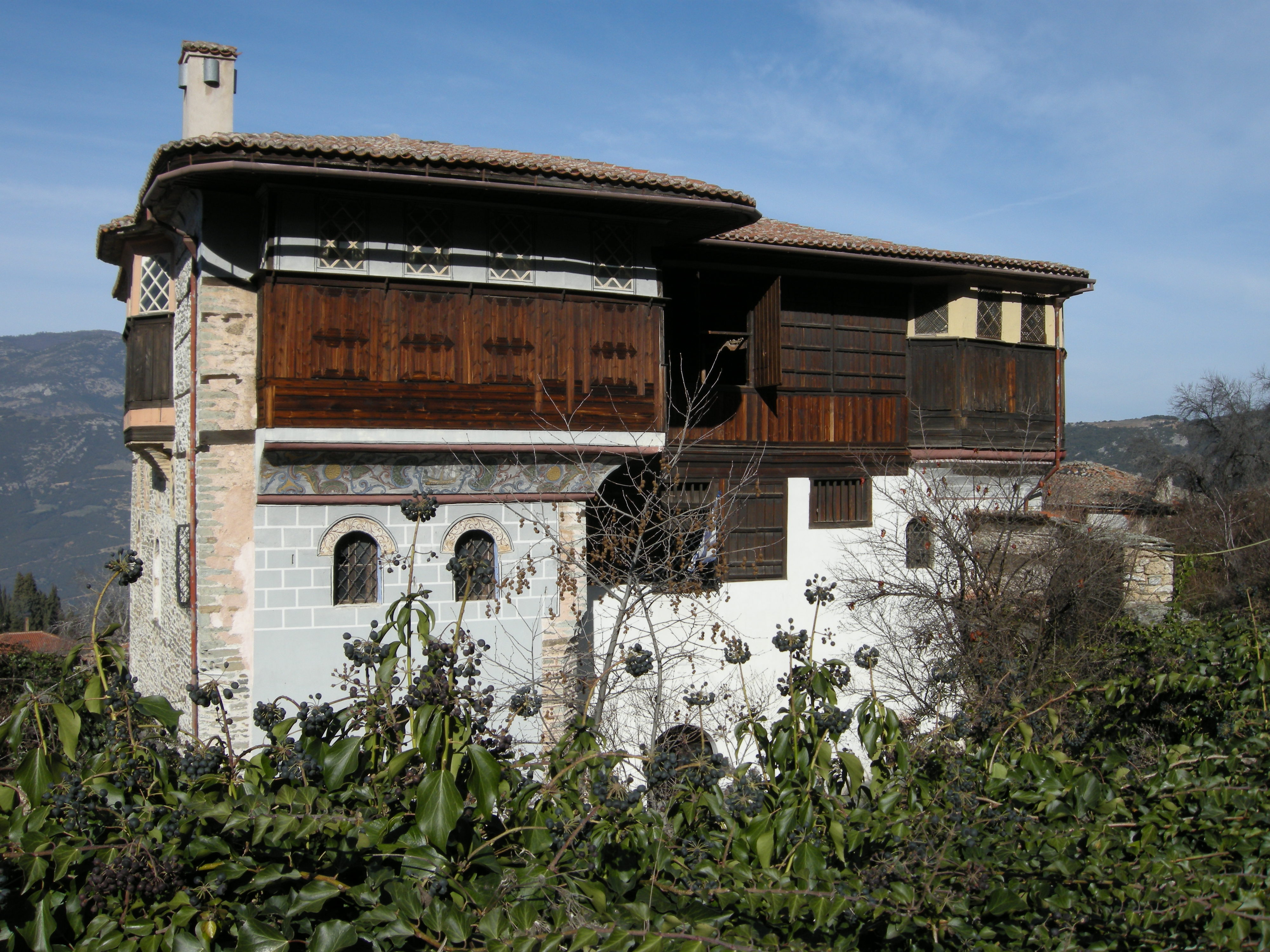
Headquarters of the Ambelakia Common Company (Schwartz mansion)

The cooperative spirit spread in Greece earlier than in other European countries. During the 18th century, a particular form of cooperative organization was developed in certain areas under Ottoman sovereignty. It was associated with specific agricultural or craft products destined to international markets. Derived from the Byzantine guilds, it was favored by the Ottoman administration because it was enabling better control of the production and tax collection. The Common Company (Syntrofia) of Ambelakia (1780 to 1812), established in Thessaly and providing Europe with high quality red cotton yarns, is typical of this system. Its development was related with a dyeing technique using the roots of the wild madder (ριζάρι, Rubia tinctorum) and providing an indelible and shiny color. 22 villages possessing 24 factories participated to the Syntrofia, which had 6000 individual members: financiers and landowners providing for capital and land, technicians providing know-how, workers providing labor. It operated several branch stores abroad (Amsterdam, Dresden, Hamburg, Leipzig, Odessa, London, St. Petersburg...). In 1810, its capital amounted to 20 000 000 gold francs, deposited in the Bank of Vienna. Other well-known cooperatives established in Greece during the Ottoman period, are the Shipping Guilds of the islands Hydra, Spetses and Psara; the Community of Mantemi, exploiting the mines of Chalkidhiki (Macedonia); and the Community of “Mastic Villages” (Μαστιχοχώρια) de Chios (North Aegean), whose activities were based on the mastic - a resin extracted from the mastic trees, growing only on this island and used for cosmetic, culinary and medicinal purposes.

In the rest of Europe, primarily in Britain and France, the cooperative movement began mainly in the 19th century. The Industrial Revolution and the increasing mechanisation of the economy transformed society and threatened the livelihoods of many workers. The concurrent labour and social movements and the issues they attempted to address describe the climate at the time.

The first documented consumer cooperative was founded in 1769, in a barely furnished cottage in Fenwick, East Ayrshire, when local weavers manhandled a sack of oatmeal into John Walker's whitewashed front room and began selling the contents at a discount, forming the Fenwick Weavers' Society.

In 1810, Rev. Henry Duncan of the Ruthwell Presbyterian Church in Dumfriesshire, Scotland founded a friendly society to create a cooperative depository institution at which his poorest parishioners could hold savings accounts accruing interest for sickness and old-age, which was the first established savings bank that would be merged into the Trustee Savings Bank between 1970 and 1985.

In the decades that followed, several cooperatives or cooperative societies formed including Lennoxtown Friendly Victualling Society, founded in 1812.

By 1830, there were several hundred cooperatives. Some were initially successful, but most cooperatives founded in the early 19th century had failed by 1840. However, Lockhurst Lane Industrial Co-operative Society (founded in 1832 and now Heart of England Co-operative Society), and Galashiels and Hawick Co-operative Societies (1839 or earlier, merged with The Co-operative Group) still trade today.

It was not until 1844 when the Rochdale Society of Equitable Pioneers established the "Rochdale Principles" on which they ran their cooperative, that the basis for development and growth of the modern cooperative movement was established.

Financially, cooperative banks, called credit unions in the US, were invented in Germany in the mid-19th century, first by Franz Hermann Schulze-Delitzsch (1852, urban), then by Friedrich Wilhelm Raiffeisen (1864, rural). While Schulze-Delitzsch is chronologically earlier, Raiffeisen has proven more influential over time – see history of credit unions. In Britain, the friendly society, building society, and mutual savings bank were earlier forms of similar institutions.

=== Robert Owen ===
Robert Owen (1771–1858) is considered as the father of the cooperative movement. A Welshman who made his fortune in the cotton trade, Owen believed in putting his workers in a good environment with access to education for themselves and their children. These ideas were put into effect successfully in the cotton mills of New Lanark, Scotland. It was here that the first cooperative store was opened. Spurred on by the success of this, he had the idea of forming "villages of co-operation" where workers would drag themselves out of poverty by growing their own food, making their own clothes and ultimately becoming self-governing. He tried to form such communities in Orbiston in Scotland and in New Harmony, Indiana in the United States of America, but both communities failed.

=== William King ===
Although Owen inspired the cooperative movement, others – such as Dr. William King (1786–1865) – took his ideas and made them more workable and practical. King believed in starting small, and realized that the working classes would need to set up cooperatives for themselves, so he saw his role as one of instruction. He founded a monthly periodical called The Co-operator, the first edition of which appeared on 1 May 1828. This gave a mixture of cooperative philosophy and practical advice about running a shop using cooperative principles. King advised people not to cut themselves off from society, but rather to form a society within a society, and to start with a shop because, "We must go to a shop every day to buy food and necessaries – why then should we not go to our own shop?" He proposed sensible rules, such as having a weekly account audit, having 3 trustees, and not having meetings in pubs (to avoid the temptation of drinking profits).

=== Rochdale Pioneers ===
The Rochdale Society of Equitable Pioneers was a group of 10 weavers and 20 others in Rochdale, England, that was formed in 1844. As the mechanization of the Industrial Revolution was forcing more and more skilled workers into poverty, these tradesmen decided to band together to open their own store selling food items they could not otherwise afford. With lessons from prior failed attempts at cooperation in mind, they designed the now famous Rochdale Principles, and over a period of four months they struggled to pool one pound sterling per person for a total of 28 pounds of capital. On December 21, 1844, they opened their store with a very meager selection of butter, sugar, flour, oatmeal and a few candles. Within three months, they expanded their selection to include tea and tobacco, and they were soon known for providing high quality, unadulterated goods.

== English CWS and Co-operative Group ==
The Co-operative Group formed gradually over 140 years from the merger of many independent retail societies, and their wholesale societies and federations. In 1863, twenty years after the Rochdale Pioneers opened their cooperative, the North of England Co-operative Society was launched by 300 individual co-ops across Yorkshire and Lancashire. By 1872, it had become known as the Co-operative Wholesale Society (CWS). Through the 20th century, smaller societies merged with CWS, such as the Scottish Co-operative Wholesale Society (1973) and the South Suburban Co-operative Society (1984).

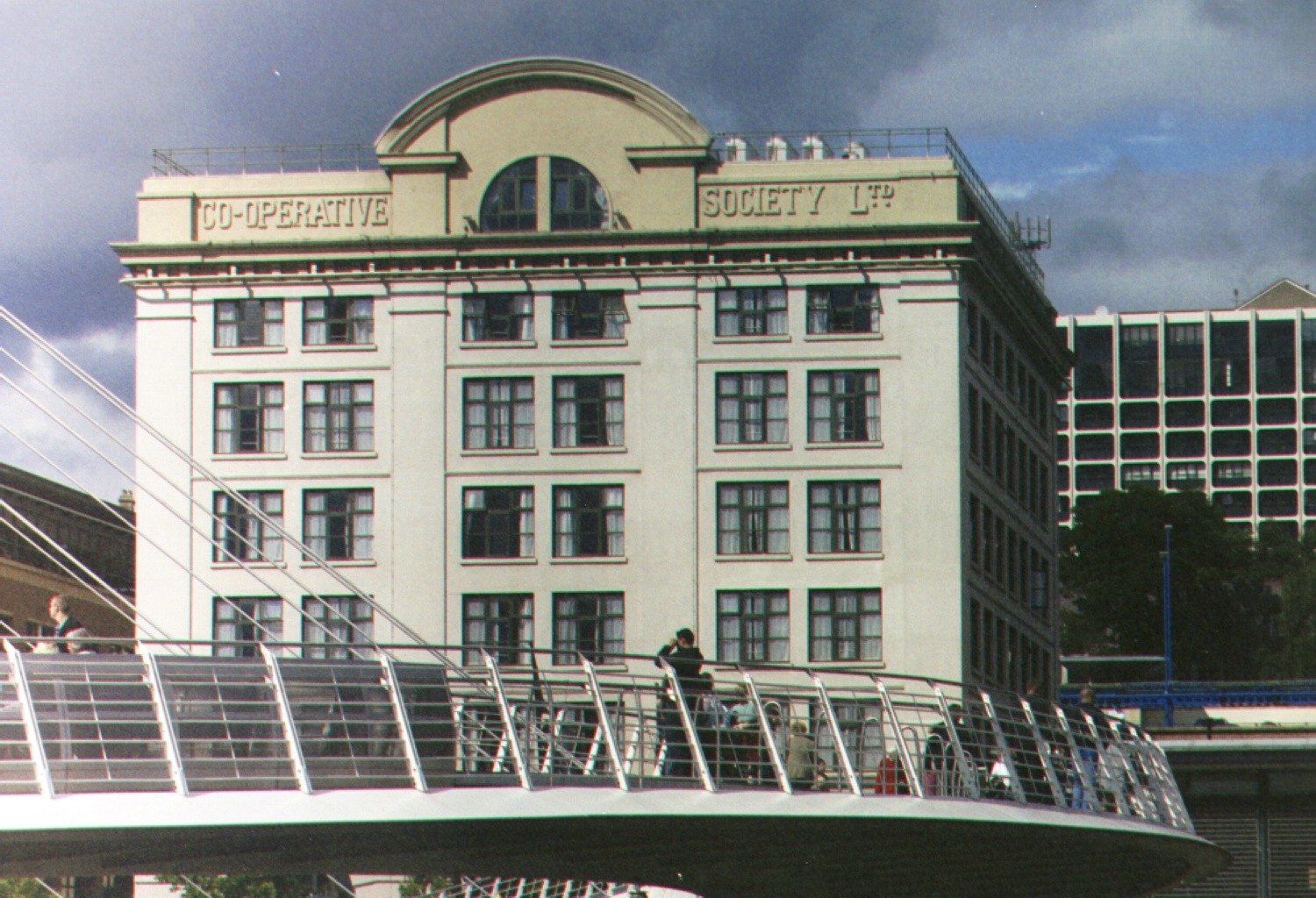
The old Co-operative building behind the Gateshead Millennium Bridge in Newcastle upon Tyne.

By the 1990s, CWS's share of the market had declined considerably and many came to doubt the viability of cooperative model. CWS sold its factories to Andrew Regan in 1994. Regan returned in 1997 with a £1.2 billion bid for CWS. There were allegations of "carpet-bagging" – new members who joined simply to make money from the sale – and more seriously fraud and commercial leaks. After a lengthy battle, Regan's bid was seen off and two senior CWS executives were dismissed and imprisoned for fraud. Regan was cleared of charges. The episode recharged CWS and its membership base. Tony Blair's Co-operative Commission, chaired by John Monks, made major recommendations for the cooperative movement, including the organization and marketing of the retail societies. It was in this climate that, in 2000, CWS merged with the UK's second largest society, Co-operative Retail Services.

Its headquarters complex is situated on the north side of Manchester city centre adjacent to the Manchester Victoria railway station. The complex is made up of many different buildings with two notable tower blocks of New Century House and the solar panel-clad CIS tower.

Other independent societies are part owners of the Group. Representatives of the societies that part own the Group are elected to the Group's national board. The Group manages The Co-operative brand and the Co-operative Retail Trading Group (CRTG), which sources and promotes goods for food stores. There is a similar purchasing group (CTTG) for cooperative travel agents.

== U.S. Cooperatives ==
The United States first known Co-op was the mutual fire insurance company founded in 1752 by Benjamin Franklin. The first dairy co-op was founded in 1810 with small locals found nationwide by 1866. The first known consumer co-op in 1845 was Boston's Workingman's Protective Union. The country's first organization to promote cooperative values and the Rochdale Principles was the Order of the Patrons of Husbandry, known as the Grange that started after the Civil War. The cooperative movement grew during the 1890s in response to the expansion of large corporate monopolies. The country's first credit unions were in Massachusetts while The Cooperative League of the United States of America, known today as the National Cooperative Business Association was organized in 1916 to promote cooperatives. In the late 1960s the Co-op movement entered a new phase with Food cooperatives and Food Conspiracies as an alternative to corporate agriculture that linked organic farmers to urban consumers.

The cooperative model has a long history in the U.S., including a factory in the 1790s, the Knights of Labor, and the Grange. In Colorado, the Meadowlark cooperative administered the only private free land program in the United States, providing many services to its members who buy and sell together. In New York City, several food cooperatives were founded around 2010, adding to others, some existing since the 1970s. The U.S. has some diverse worker cooperatives, such as a home care agency, an organic bread factory co-op and an engineering firm. Some have already incorporated environmental and/or Fair Trade criteria into their products, such as the aforementioned bread-maker, Organic Valley, and Equal Exchange.

Credit unions were established in the U.S. by 1908. Their member-owned, cooperative structure created stable governance structure, so that they were only slightly affected by the 2008 mortgage securities crisis.

Electrical cooperatives became an important economic strategy for U.S. rural areas beginning in the 1930s, and continue to operate successfully through events such as Hurricane Sandy in 2012. However, the majority in the U.S. demonstrate that cooperative values do not necessarily lead to a progressive social and environmental consciousness, as many remain focuses on fossil fuel and nuclear fuels. Nevertheless, new generation renewable power cooperatives have begun to be organized.

Agricultural cooperatives in the U.S. have had some mainstream success, including Welch's, Ocean Spray, and Land O'Lakes.

In the United States, a cooperative association was founded by 1920. Currently there are over 29,000 cooperatives employing 2 million people with over $652 billion in annual revenue. To address the need for an organization oriented to newer and smaller co-ops, the United States Federation of Worker Cooperatives was founded after 2000.

An alternative method of employee-ownership, the Employee Stock Ownership Plan (ESOP), was developed in the U.S. by Louis Kelso and advocated by Senator Russell Long to be incentivized in the ERISA law of 1974. For example, a large Southeastern US supermarket chain a California manufacturer, and a furniture-maker with earnings of more than $2 billion, are employee-owned. Employee-owned trusts have also been developed more or less independently, for example at an established iron pipe company

== Co-operative Women's Guild ==
Alice Acland, the editor of the "Women's Corner" in the Co-operative News publication, and Mary Lawrenson, a teacher, recognized the need for a separate women's organization within the Cooperative Movement and began organizing a "Woman's League for the Spread of Co-operation" in 1883. This League formally met for the first time during the 1883 Co-operative Congress in Edinburgh in a group of 50 women and established Acland as its organizing secretary. By 1884 it had six different branches with 195 members, and the League was renamed the Women's Cooperative Guild.

The Guild organized around working women's issues and expanding the Cooperative Movement. It continued to publish articles advocating for women's involvement in the Cooperative Movement in the "Women's Corner," and later through its own publications such as "The importance of women for the cooperative movement." The Guild also opened the Sunderland cooperative store in 1902, which catered to poor working-class women. It engaged in many political campaigns concerning women's health, women's suffrage and pacifism. Until recently the organization participated in social justice activism, but has now closed.

== Chinese Industrial Cooperatives ==
Chinese industrial cooperatives were wartime cooperatives which supported the Chinese army during the Second Sino-Japanese War. Solidarity against the Japanese invasion provided new motivation for cooperation and so industrial cooperatives were created to allow the unemployed and refugees to join the war effort.

The International Committee for the Promotion of Chinese Industrial Cooperatives (ICCIC), often named Gung Ho, was established in 1938 and quickly reached its peak in 1941. Membership then began to fall as the refugees, displaced by the war, began to return home. The workforce had previously been estimated to consist of up to 60% refugees. The ICCIC was later suspended by Mao due to concerns over foreign influence and clashes with party ideology. There was a shift towards agricultural cooperatives rather than industrial development, despite previous support by Mao for their contribution during the war.

The principles of Gung Ho included democratic self-governance and group responsibility with the aim of achieving collective prosperity, distributed proportionally according to the effort each individual put in. They wove blankets and produced uniforms that were sent to the front lines, founded schools and training classes, hospitals and laboratories.

Gung ho was the Chinese name for industrial cooperatives but was erroneously translated as 'work together' by the US Marines who believed it was the motto of the hard working cooperative members. It lead to the English phrase meaning to act enthusiastically, but this bears no resemblance to the original Chinese name.

== Other developments ==
In Russia the village cooperative (obshchina or mir), operated from pre-serfdom times until the 20th century.

Raiffeisen and Schultz-Delitsch developed an independently formulated cooperative model in Germany, the credit union. The model also moved abroad, reaching the United States by the 1880s and the Knights of Labour's projects. Leland Stanford, the railroad magnate and Robber Baron, became a Senator and advocated for cooperatives. By 1920 a national association had formed in the U.S. This organization began to develop international programs, and by the 1970s, a World Council formed.

Cooperatives in the U.S. have a long history, including an early factory in the 1790s. By the 1860s Brigham Young had started applying cooperative ideas in Utah, and by the 1880s, the Knights of Labor and the Grange both promoted member-owned organizations. Energy cooperatives were founded in the U.S. during the Depression and the New Deal. Diverse kinds of cooperatives were founded and have continued to perform successfully in different areas: in agriculture, wholesale purchasing, telephones, and in consumer-food buying.

James Warbasse, an American doctor, became the first president of the U.S. National Co-operative Business Association. He wrote extensively on cooperative history and philosophy. Benjamin Ward began an important effort in cooperative economic theory in the 1950s, with Jaroslav Vanek developing a general theory. David Ellerman began a line of theoretical thinking beginning with legal principles, developing especially the labor theory of property, and later reaching a treatment which evaluates the role of capital in labor managed firms using the conventional economic production formula Q = f(K, L). At one point in the 1990s he worked at the World Bank with Nobel laureate Joseph Stiglitz.

== Modern day ==
Cooperative enterprises were formed successfully following Rochdale, and an international association was formed in 1895. Cooperative enterprises are now widespread, with one of the largest and most successful examples being the industrial Mondragón Cooperative Corporation in the Basque country of Spain. Mondragon Co-op was founded under the oppressive conditions of Fascist Franco Spain after community-based democracy-building activities of a priest, Jose Maria Arizmendiarrieta. They have become an extremely diverse network of cooperative enterprises, a huge enterprise in Spain, and a multinational concern. Cooperatives were also successful in Yugoslavia under Tito where Workers' Councils gained a significant role in management.

In many European countries, cooperative institutions have a predominant market share in the retail banking and insurance businesses. There are also concrete proposals for the cooperative management of the common goods, such as the one by Initiative 136 in Greece.

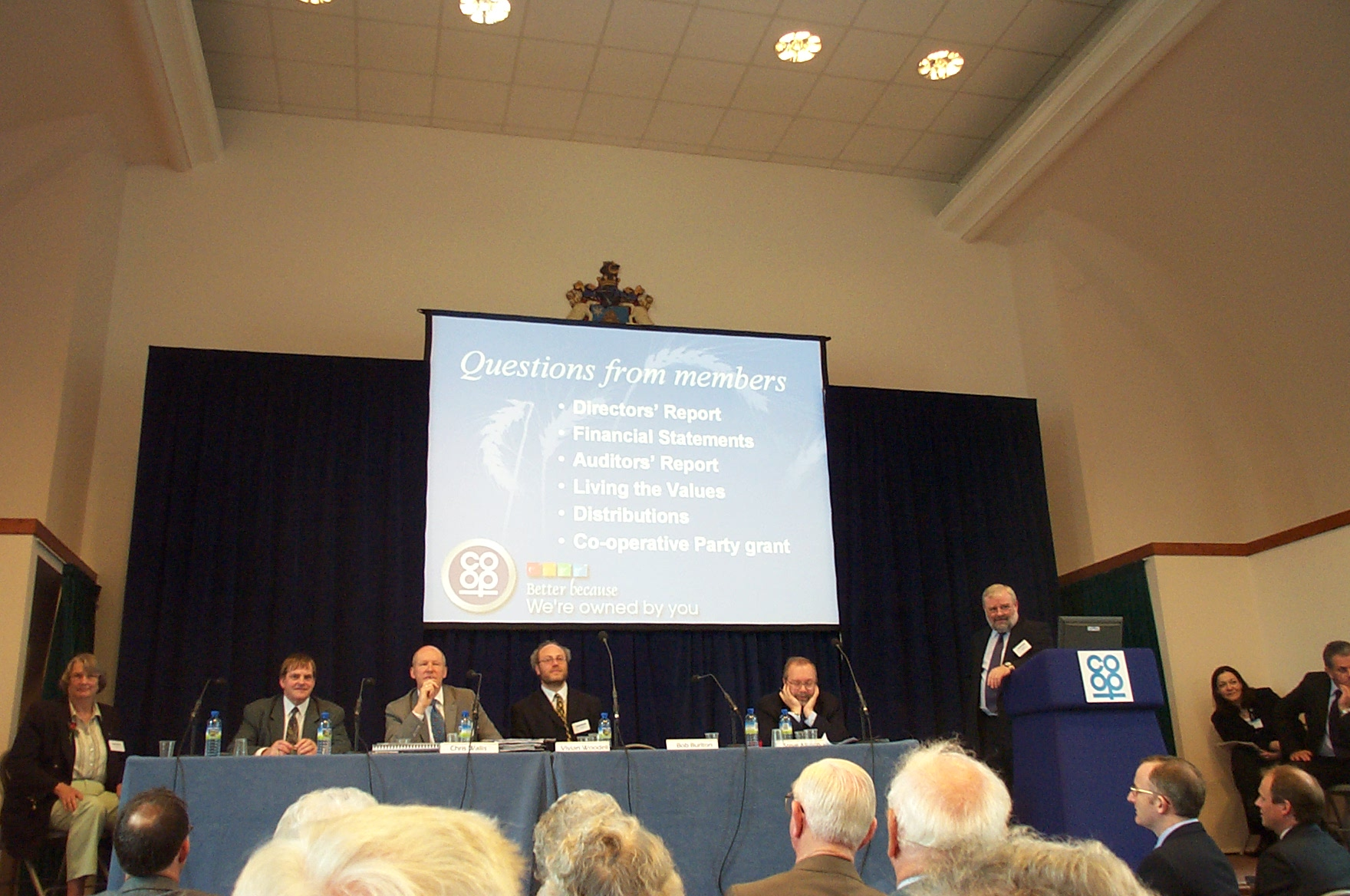
An annual general meeting of a retail cooperative in England, 2005.

In the UK, cooperatives formed the Co-operative Party in the early 20th century to represent members of co-ops in Parliament. The Co-operative Party now has a permanent electoral pact with the Labour Party, and some Labour MPs are Co-operative Party members. UK cooperatives retain a significant market share in food retail, insurance, banking, funeral services, and the travel industry in many parts of the country.

Denmark has had a strong cooperative movement, especially in the farming and industrial sectors. Co-housing is also common in Denmark in which residents share a common eating and gathering space. In some instances, the living spaces are financed by the Danish Housing Association, but other times residents collectively own the land and property.

In Germany, the rebuilding of the country after World War II created a legislative opportunity in which politician Hans Boeckler significantly lobbied for the co-determination ("Mitbestimmung") policies which were established, requiring large companies to include a Workers' Council in the Board of Directors. These policies have had some influence on European Union policies.

Emilia Romagna, Italy had two separate and strong cooperative traditions that resisted Cold War interference by US agencies and have worked effectively in conjunction with each other.

Cooperative banks have become very successful throughout Europe, and were able to respond more effectively than most corporate banks during the 2008 mortgage-securities crisis.

Renewable Energy cooperatives in Europe became important in the early development of windpower in Denmark beginning in the 1970s. Germany followed in the early 1990s, first on a larger scale with wind co-ops, then with a citizen's movement which challenged the reliance on nuclear power, organized, challenged the energy monopolists there, and successfully created a successful co-op social enterprise by 1999. A citizen's group began operating wind turbines and involving broad community ownership in the U.K. by 1995. Deregulation of the electricity markets allowed energy cooperative social entrepreneurs to begin to create alternatives to the monopolies in various countries. In France, where an enormous percentage of the power is generated by nuclear sources, this occurred after 2000. In Spain, wind power was developed by corporate-led efforts, and it took longer for a renewable energy-focused social enterprise to get established. Similar renewable energy co-ops around Europe have organized in a network.

Asian societies have adapted the cooperative model, including some of the most successful in the world. Nevertheless, the crises generated by traditional inequalities and the shareholder model continues to require civil society and entrepreneurial responses, such as the Citizens Coalition for Economic Justice in South Korea, the Seikatsu Club Consumers' Co-operative Union in Japan, and the Self-Employed Women's Association in India. Other noteworthy efforts include Sophon Suphapong's efforts as governor in Thailand with agricultural co-ops and Antonio Yapsutco Fortich's contributions in the Philippines helping formulate a cooperative strategy with sugar workers.

The International Labor Organization, originally established in 1919, has a Co-operative Division.

Cooperatives were brought to Latin America and developed there by 1902. Substantial independent efforts to develop employee-owned enterprises or cooperatives have occurred as responses to crises, such as 2001 crisis in Argentina. In Brazil, the World Social Forum process lead to the articulation of Solidarity Economics, a modern, activist formulation of cooperativism.

The Fair Trade certification movement established first in the Netherlands in 1988 with an international headquarters in Bonn nine years later requires member farmers to have established a cooperative.

In 2016, UNESCO inscribed "Idea and practice of organizing shared interests in cooperatives" on the Representative List of the Intangible Cultural Heritage of Humanity.

== See also ==
- Agricultural cooperatives
- British co-operative movement
- Cooperative economics
- Cooperative Stock Market
- Industrial and Provident Societies Partnership Act 1852
- Social economy
- Solidarity economy
- Sovereigns of Industry
