= Alice Acland (social activist) =

British social activist (1849–1935)

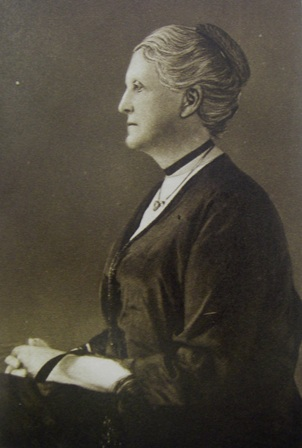
- Born: Alice Sophia Cunningham; 3 February 1849; Heath Lodge, Petersfield, Hampshire, England
- Died: 5 July 1935 (aged 86); London, England
- Occupations: Activist in women's rights and the cooperative movement, general secretary and President of Co-operative Women's Guild
- Known for: Founder of the Co-operative Women's Guild
- Partner: Arthur Dyke Acland (m. 1873)

Lady Alice Sophia Acland (née Cunningham; 3 February 1849 – 5 July 1935) was the founder, the first General Secretary and the first president of the Co-operative Women's Guild.

== Personal life ==
Alice Acland was born on 3 February 1849 to Reverend Francis Macaulay Cunningham and Alice Charlotte Poore. She grew up in Hampshire and Oxford, and received a church education. She married Sir Arthur Dyke Acland, 13th Baronet on 14 June 1873, with whom she later had two sons and a daughter.

== Role in the Co-operative Women's Guild ==
Alice's husband was an advocate for educational opportunities for working-class men. She travelled with him on speaking tours which led to her own involvement in providing more opportunities for working-class women. She noted the value of The Cooperative Movement and its potential to provide opportunities for women, as women held purchasing power for their households.

Acland began writing articles about women's lives for Cooperative News. On 6 January 1883, Cooperative News editor Samuel Bamford created the column Women's Corner and appointed Acland as editor. Her first appeal set in motion women's role in the Cooperative movement, stating:

What are men always urged to do when there is a meeting held at any place to encourage or to start co-operative institutions? Come! Help! Vote! Criticize! Act! What are women urged to do? Come and buy! That is the limit of the special work pointed out to us women. We can be independent members of our store, but we are only asked to come and 'buy'- that is all. In this matter of co-operation why should not we women do more than we do? Surely, without departing from our own sphere, and without trying to undertake work which can be better done by men, there is more for us women to do than to spend money. Spend our money at our own store we must, that is a matter of course; but our duty does not end here, nor our duty to our fellow creatures. To come and 'buy' is all we can be asked to do; but cannot we go further ourselves? Why should not we have our meetings, our readings, our discussions?

Her column's popularity led to coordination of the Women's League for the Spread of Co-operation, soon after renamed the Co-operative Women's Guild. Formation of a central board and meeting space for women was proposed in a letter to Women's Corner from "M.L. Woolwich", a pseudonym of Mary Lawrenson who became a co-founder of the Guild. The Guild was formally inaugurated in June 1883. Acland served as General Secretary of the guild in 1883, but resigned from the position due to ill-health. She served as President from 1884 to 1886, again resigning due to further health problems.

Non-profit organization positions
Preceded by New position	Secretary of the Women's Co-operative Guild; 1883–1884	Succeeded by Mary Lawrenson
