= Co-op News =

Co-operative newspaper

- Executive Editor: Rebecca Harvey
- Mergers: Scottish Co-operator (1893–1974)
- Predecessors: Manchester Equitable Society's Co-operator (1858)
- Other names: The Co-operative News
- Frequency: Weekly (1871–2006); Fortnightly (2006–2017); Monthly (2017–present)
- Format: Monthly 52 page news magazine
- Publisher: Co-operative Press Ltd
- Founded: 1871
- First issue: 2 September 1871; 153 years ago
- Country: United Kingdom
- Language: English
- Website: thenews.coop
- ISSN: 0009-9821
- OCLC: 8651676

Co-op News is a UK-based monthly news magazine and website for the global co-operative movement.

First published in Manchester in 1871 as The Co-operative News, the paper is the world's oldest co-operative newspaper. Originally a weekly newspaper, the paper moved to being published fortnightly in 2006, and finally monthly in 2017. Recent years have also seen the newspaper re-brand and move to its current news magazine format.

The paper is based in Holyoake House, Manchester and is published by the Co-operative Press, a consumer co-operative whose members are the subscribers of the paper.

In 1883 the paper began publishing a Women's Corner, edited by Alice Acland. This fomented the establishment of the Women's League for the Spread of Co-operation later that year. The League was later renamed to the Women's Co-operative Guild.

In 1971 the Scottish Co-operator – founded 1893 – was merged into the Co-operative News.

== See also ==
- Co-operative Press
