= Danish Crown (company) =

Danish food company

Danish Crown A/S
- Type: Aktieselskab
- Industry: Slaughtering / Food processing
- Founded: 1887; 139 years ago
- Headquarters: Randers, Denmark
- Area served: Worldwide
- Key people: Niels Duedahl (CEO)
- Products: Deli meat; Pantry foods; Sausages
- Revenue: ▲DKK 44.34 million (2007)
- Operating income: ▲DKK 60 billion (2021)
- Net income: ▲DKK 1.23 million (2007)
- Number of employees: 23,000 (2020)
- Subsidiaries: Tulip Food Company
- Website: www.danishcrown.com

Danish Crown is an internationally oriented Danish food company with butchery operations, processing and sales of primarily pork and beef. Through a number of subsidiaries, the group is widely represented within the food industry with various food products. The CEO is Niels Duedahl and the headquarters are located in Randers.

The Danish Crown group is owned by 5,620 Danish farmers, and annually the group is part of 49 billion meals for consumers worldwide. The group has a turnover of approximately DKK 60 billion kroner and employs approximately 26,600 employees across 89 production sites, 40 warehouses and 38 offices across 30 countries.

The group is the world's largest pork exporter and Europe's largest producer of pork. The Danish Crown group is also Europe's largest meat processing company.

In the financial year 2020–21, Danish Crown's exports amounted to DKK 24 billion kroner. This corresponds to approximately 20% of Danish food exports and approximately 3% of Danish merchandise exports.

In October 2026 news broke in Danish media, that Danish Crown slaughtered cattle in Polan without stunning. This practice is not legal forbidden in Denmark. https://nyheder.tv2.dk/samfund/2026-10-26-danish-crowns-polske-forretning-slagter-kvaeg-uden-bedoevelse

== History ==
The first Danish cooperative pig abattoir was established in Horsens, Denmark in 1887. In the following 40–50 years, a large number of cooperative pig abattoirs were established across the country. In 1960, the cooperative abattoirs began to merge in order to better have the strength to carry out the tasks with, among other things, sales, marketing and product development.

In 1990, Danish Crown was established as a fusion of Wenbo, Østjyske and Tulip Food Company (which included Horsens Andels-Svineslagteri from 1887), and in 1994, Slagteri Syd was merged in. In 1998, Danish Crown and Vestjyske Slagterier merged.

In April 2002, the Danish Competition Council gave permission for a merger between Danish Crown and Steff Houlberg, and a large part of the original cooperative pig abattoirs is part of the new Danish Crown.

On 13 October 2010, the shareholders decided to transfer the activities to a limited company, Danish Crown A/S formerly Danish Crown Holding A/S. The co-operatives retained ownership through the co-operative, which is now called the Danish Crown Amba Supply Company. The limited company was originally established on 1 July 2001.

== Danish Crown group ==
Danish Crown

- Head office Randers
- Abattoir Skærbæk
- Abattoir Blans
- Abattoir Herning
- Abattoir Horsens
- Abattoir Ringsted (closed)
- Abattoir Sæby
- Abattoir Rønne
- Abattoir Essen
- Abattoir Oldenburg (closed)
- Abattoir Boizenburg
- Abbattoir Kolo
- Soup factory Esbjerg
- Processing factory Herning
- Processing factory Kolding
- Processing factory Låsby
- Processing factory Svenstrup
- Processing factory Thorning
- Processing factory Aabenraa
- Processing factory Schüttorf
- Processing factory Pinghu
- Processing factory Bonnétable
- Processing factory Jönköping
- Processing factory Haarlem

Danish Crown Beef

- Headoffice/abattoir Holsted
- Abattoir Aalborg
- Abattoir Husum
- Abattoir Teterow
- Processing factory Sdr. Felding

Subsidiaries

- Sokolow
- ESS-FOOD
- DAT-Schaub
- KLS Ugglarps
- Scan-Hide
- SPF-Danmark A/S
- Agri-Norcold A/S
