= List of life peerages (1958–1979) =

Peerages and baronetcies of Britain and Ireland
Extant	All
Dukes	Dukedoms
Marquesses	Marquessates
Earls	Earldoms
Viscounts	Viscountcies
Barons	Baronies
En, Sc, GB, Ire, UK (law, life: 1958–1979, 1979–1997, 1997–2010, 2010–2024, 2024–present)
Baronets	Baronetcies

This is a list of life peerages in the Peerage of the United Kingdom created under the Life Peerages Act 1958 from the time the Act came into effect to 1979, grouped by prime minister. During this period there were five prime ministers: three Conservatives, Harold Macmillan, Alec Douglas-Home, and Edward Heath, and two from the Labour Party, Harold Wilson (who served twice) and James Callaghan.

== Harold Macmillan (1958–1963) ==
Number	Date of creation	Name	Title	Territorial qualification	Date of extinction
1	1 August 1958	Ian Fraser ‡	Baron Fraser of Lonsdale	of Regent's Park in the County of London	19 December 1974
2	2 August 1958	Victor Collins ‡	Baron Stonham	of Earl Stonham in the County of Suffolk	22 December 1971
3	4 August 1958	Charles Geddes	Baron Geddes of Epsom	of Epsom in the County of Surrey	2 May 1983
4	5 August 1958	John Stopford	Baron Stopford of Fallowfield	of Hindley Green in the County Palatine of Lancaster	6 March 1961
5	6 August 1958	Granville West ‡	Baron Granville-West	of Pontypool in the County of Monmouth	23 September 1984
6	7 August 1958	Stephen Taylor ‡	Baron Taylor	of Harlow in the County of Essex	1 February 1988
7	8 August 1958	Barbara Wootton	Baroness Wootton of Abinger	of Abinger Common in the County of Surrey	11 July 1988
8	11 August 1958	Edward Shackleton ‡	Baron Shackleton	of Burley in the County of Southampton	22 September 1994
9	18 August 1958	Edward Twining	Baron Twining	of Tanganyika and of Godalming in the County of Surrey	21 July 1967
10	22 August 1958	Robert Boothby ‡	Baron Boothby	of Buchan and Rattray Head in the County of Aberdeen	16 July 1986
11	22 September 1958	Stella Isaacs, Dowager Marchioness of Reading	Baroness Swanborough	of Swanborough in the County of Sussex	22 May 1971
12	24 September 1958	Victor Noel-Paton	Baron Ferrier	of Culter in the County of Lanark	4 June 1992
13	26 September 1958	Katharine Elliot	Baroness Elliot of Harwood	of Rulewater in the County of Roxburgh	3 January 1994
14	30 September 1958	Hubert Parker	Baron Parker of Waddington	of Lincoln's Inn in the Borough of Holborn	15 September 1972
15	6 October 1958	Irene Curzon, 2nd Baroness Ravensdale	Baroness Ravensdale of Kedleston	of Kedleston in the County of Derby	9 February 1966
16	14 February 1959	Hartley Shawcross ‡	Baron Shawcross	of Friston in the County of Sussex	10 July 2003
17	17 February 1959	Edwin Plowden	Baron Plowden	of Plowden in the County of Salop	15 February 2001
18	19 February 1959	Eric James	Baron James of Rusholme	of Fallowfield in the County Palatine of Lancaster	16 May 1992
19	16 June 1959	Lionel Robbins	Baron Robbins	of Clare Market in the City of Westminster	15 May 1984
20	2 November 1959	Herbert Morrison ‡	Baron Morrison of Lambeth	of Lambeth in the County of London	6 March 1965
21	3 November 1959	Jack Browne ‡	Baron Craigton	of Renfield in the County of the City of Glasgow	28 July 1993
22	16 December 1959	Florence Horsbrugh ‡	Baroness Horsbrugh	of Horsbrugh in the County of Peebles	6 December 1969
23	28 January 1960	Hugh Dalton ‡	Baron Dalton	of Forest and Frith in the County Palatine of Durham	13 February 1962
24	30 January 1960	Sir Alfred Bossom, Bt. ‡	Baron Bossom	of Maidstone in the County of Kent	4 September 1965
25	16 May 1960	Richard Casey	Baron Casey	of Berwick in the State of Victoria and Commonwealth of Australia and of the City of Westminster	17 June 1976
26	2 February 1961	Tom Williams ‡	Baron Williams of Barnburgh	of Barnburgh in the West Riding of the County of York	29 March 1967
27	4 February 1961	Edith Summerskill ‡	Baroness Summerskill	of Ken Wood in the County of London	4 February 1980
28	7 February 1961	William Hughes	Baron Hughes	of Hawkhill in the County of the City of Dundee	31 December 1999
29	8 February 1961	James Peddie	Baron Peddie	of the City and County of Kingston upon Hull	13 April 1978
30	9 February 1961	George Lindgren ‡	Baron Lindgren	of Welwyn Garden City in the County of Hertford	8 September 1971
31	10 February 1961	Henry Walston	Baron Walston	of Newton in the County of Cambridge	29 May 1991
32	16 February 1961	Cuthbert Alport ‡	Baron Alport	of Colchester in the County of Essex	28 October 1998
33	21 February 1961	Hugh Molson ‡	Baron Molson	of High Peak in the County of Derby	13 October 1991
34	2 June 1961	Geoffrey Fisher	Baron Fisher of Lambeth	of Lambeth in the County of London	15 September 1972
35	28 June 1961	Alfred Robens ‡	Baron Robens of Woldingham	of Woldingham in the County of Surrey	27 June 1999
36	11 July 1961	Alexander Coutanche	Baron Coutanche	of Saint Brelade in the Island of Jersey	18 December 1973
37	12 April 1962	Elaine Burton ‡	Baroness Burton of Coventry	of Coventry in the County of Warwick	6 October 1991
38	13 April 1962	Francis Williams	Baron Francis-Williams	of Abinger in the County of Surrey	5 June 1970
39	16 April 1962	Alexander R. Todd	Baron Todd	of Trumpington in the County of Cambridge	10 January 1997
40	3 May 1962	Alan Sainsbury	Baron Sainsbury	of Drury Lane in the Borough of Holborn	21 October 1998
41	10 May 1962	Oliver Franks	Baron Franks	of Headington in the County of Oxford	15 October 1992
42	11 May 1962	Arthur Champion ‡	Baron Champion	of Pontypridd in the County of Glamorgan	2 March 1985
43	14 May 1962	Geoffrey Hutchinson ‡	Baron Ilford	of Bury in the County Palatine of Lancaster	20 August 1974
44	15 May 1962	Tom Williamson ‡	Baron Williamson	of Eccleston in the Borough of Saint Helens	27 February 1983
45	31 January 1963	Eric Edwards	Baron Chelmer	of Margaretting in the County of Essex	3 March 1997
46	13 June 1963	Charles Hill ‡	Baron Hill of Luton	of Harpenden in the County of Hertford	22 August 1989
47	9 July 1963	Alick Buchanan-Smith	Baron Balerno	of Currie in the County of Midlothian	28 July 1984

‡ former MP

== Sir Alec Douglas-Home (1963–1964) ==
Number	Date of creation	Name	Title	Territorial qualification	Date of extinction
1	13 January 1964	Frances Davidson, Viscountess Davidson ‡	Baroness Northchurch	of Chiswick in the County of Middlesex	25 November 1985
2	15 January 1964	Gerald Gardiner	Baron Gardiner	of Kittisford in the County of Somerset	7 January 1990
3	16 January 1964	Richard Llewelyn-Davies	Baron Llewelyn-Davies	of Hastoe in the County of Hertford	27 October 1981
4	18 January 1964	B. V. Bowden	Baron Bowden	of Chesterfield in the County of Derby	31 July 1989
5	20 January 1964	Charles Hobson ‡	Baron Hobson	of Brent in the County of Middlesex	17 February 1966
6	21 January 1964	Ted Willis	Baron Willis	of Chislehurst in the County of Kent	22 December 1992
7	22 January 1964	Edwin Herbert	Baron Tangley	of Blackheath in the County of Surrey	5 June 1973
8	23 January 1964	Dora Gaitskell	Baroness Gaitskell	of Egremont in the County of Cumberland	1 July 1989
9	20 April 1964	Dennis Vosper ‡	Baron Runcorn	of Heswall in the County Palatine of Chester	20 January 1968
10	21 August 1964	Sir Hendrie Oakshott, Bt. ‡	Baron Oakshott	of Bebington in the County Palatine of Chester	1 February 1975
11	22 August 1964	Geoffrey Bourne	Baron Bourne	of Atherstone in the County of Warwick	26 June 1982
12	24 August 1964	Anthony Hurd ‡	Baron Hurd	of Newbury in the Royal County of Berks	12 February 1966
13	25 August 1964	Charles Royle ‡	Baron Royle	of Pendleton in the City of Salford	30 September 1975
14	14 September 1964	Hervey Rhodes ‡	Baron Rhodes	of Saddleworth in the West Riding of the County of York	11 September 1987
15	17 September 1964	Keith Murray	Baron Murray of Newhaven	of Newhaven in the County of the City of Edinburgh	10 October 1993
16	5 October 1964	Dick Mitchison ‡	Baron Mitchison	of Carradale in the County of Argyll	14 February 1970

‡ former MP

== Harold Wilson (1964–1970) ==
Date of creation	Name	Title	Territorial qualification	Date of retirement (if applicable)	Date of extinction
27 October 1964	Hugh Foot	Baron Caradon	of St Cleer in the County of Cornwall		5 September 1990
29 October 1964	C. P. Snow	Baron Snow	of the City of Leicester		1 July 1980
11 November 1964	Alun Gwynne Jones	Baron Chalfont	of Llantarnam in the County of Monmouth	10 November 2015	13 January 2020
7 December 1964	Barbara Brooke	Baroness Brooke of Ystradfellte	of Ystradfellte in the County of Brecknock		1 September 2000
8 December 1964	Evelyn Emmet ‡	Baroness Emmet of Amberley	of Amberley in the County of Sussex		10 October 1980
12 December 1964	Frank Bowles ‡	Baron Bowles	of Nuneaton in the County of Warwick		29 December 1970
14 December 1964	Harold Collison	Baron Collison	of Cheshunt in the County of Hertford		29 December 1995
15 December 1964	Reginald Sorensen ‡	Baron Sorensen	of Leyton in the County of Essex		8 October 1971
16 December 1964	Charles Leatherland	Baron Leatherland	of Dunton in the County of Essex		18 December 1992
16 December 1964	Billy Blyton ‡	Baron Blyton	of South Shields in the County of Durham		25 October 1987
17 December 1964	Fenner Brockway ‡	Baron Brockway	of Eton and of Slough in the County of Buckingham		28 April 1988
17 December 1964	William Wynne-Jones	Baron Wynne-Jones	of Abergele in the County of Denbigh		8 November 1982
18 December 1964	Frank Beswick ‡	Baron Beswick	of Hucknall in the County of Nottingham		17 August 1987
18 December 1964	Samuel Segal ‡	Baron Segal	of Wytham in the Royal County of Berks		4 June 1985
21 December 1964	Norah Phillips	Baroness Phillips	of Fulham in the County of London		14 August 1992
21 December 1964	Lady Violet Bonham Carter	Baroness Asquith of Yarnbury	of Yarnbury in the County of Wilts		19 February 1969
22 December 1964	Wilfred Brown	Baron Brown	of Machrihanish in the County of Argyll		17 March 1985
22 December 1964	Frank Byers ‡	Baron Byers	of Lingfield in the County of Surrey		6 February 1984
28 December 1964	Donald Wade ‡	Baron Wade	of Huddersfield in the West Riding of the County of York		6 November 1988
29 December 1964	Arwyn Davies	Baron Arwyn	of Glais in the County of Glamorgan		23 February 1978
1 January 1965	James Chuter Ede ‡	Baron Chuter-Ede	of Epsom in the County of Surrey		11 November 1965
28 January 1965	Christopher Hinton	Baron Hinton of Bankside	of Dulwich in the County of London		22 June 1983
29 January 1965	William Holford	Baron Holford	of Kemp Town in the County of Sussex		17 October 1975
4 February 1965	Howard Florey	Baron Florey	of Adelaide in the Commonwealth of Australia and of Marston in the County of Oxford		21 February 1968
19 February 1965	Rab Butler ‡	Baron Butler of Saffron Walden	of Halstead in the County of Essex		8 March 1982
24 March 1965	George James Cole	Baron Cole	of Blackfriars in the County of London		29 November 1979
10 May 1965	Beatrice Plummer	Baroness Plummer	of Toppesfield in the County of Essex		13 June 1972
10 May 1965	Reginald Wells-Pestell	Baron Wells-Pestell	of Combs in the County of Suffolk		17 January 1991
11 May 1965	Harold Caccia	Baron Caccia	of Abernant in the County of Brecknock		31 October 1990
11 May 1965	Albert Hilton ‡	Baron Hilton of Upton	of Swaffham in the County of Norfolk		3 May 1977
12 May 1965	Donald Soper	Baron Soper	of Kingsway in the London Borough of Camden		22 December 1998
12 May 1965	Thomas Simey	Baron Simey	of Toxteth in the County Palatine of Lancaster		27 December 1969
13 May 1965	John Haire ‡	Baron Haire of Whiteabbey	of Newtown Abbey in the County of Antrim		7 October 1966
13 May 1965	Lewis Cohen	Baron Cohen of Brighton	of Brighton in the County of Sussex		21 October 1966
14 May 1965	Ian Winterbottom ‡	Baron Winterbottom	of Clopton in the County of Northampton		4 July 1992
14 May 1965	Dennis Lloyd	Baron Lloyd of Hampstead	of Hampstead in the London Borough of Camden		31 December 1992
17 May 1965	Clementine Churchill	Baroness Spencer-Churchill	of Chartwell in the County of Kent		12 December 1977
22 June 1965	Roxbee Cox	Baron Kings Norton	of Wotton Underwood in the County of Buckingham		21 December 1997
5 July 1965	Russell Brock	Baron Brock	of Wimbledon in the London Borough of Merton		3 September 1980
6 July 1965	Richard Kahn	Baron Kahn	of Hampstead in the London Borough of Camden		6 June 1989
7 July 1965	Richard Beeching	Baron Beeching	of East Grinstead in the County of Sussex		23 March 1985
16 July 1965	Noel Annan	Baron Annan	of the Royal Burgh of Annan in the County of Dumfries		21 February 2000
20 July 1965	Arnold Goodman	Baron Goodman	of the City of Westminster		12 May 1995
7 December 1965	Audrey Hylton-Foster	Baroness Hylton-Foster	of the City of Westminster		31 October 2002
14 January 1966	Jock Campbell	Baron Campbell of Eskan	of Camis Eskan in the County of Dumbarton		26 December 1994
15 January 1966	Stephen King-Hall ‡	Baron King-Hall	of Headley in the County of Southampton		2 June 1966
17 January 1966	Mary Stocks	Baroness Stocks	of the Royal Borough of Kensington and Chelsea		6 July 1975
18 January 1966	Israel Sieff	Baron Sieff	of Brimpton in the Royal County of Berks		14 February 1972
19 January 1966	John Fulton	Baron Fulton	of Falmer in the County of Sussex		14 March 1986
27 May 1966	Arthur Henderson ‡	Baron Rowley	of Rowley Regis in the County of Stafford		28 August 1968
31 May 1966	Sir Richard Nugent, Bt. ‡	Baron Nugent of Guildford	of Dunsfold in the County of Surrey		16 March 1994
1 June 1966	Bernard Taylor ‡	Baron Taylor of Mansfield	of Mansfield in the County of Nottingham		11 April 1991
2 June 1966	Sir William Anstruther-Gray, Bt. ‡	Baron Kilmany	of Kilmany in the County of Fife		6 August 1985
6 June 1966	Ernest Popplewell ‡	Baron Popplewell	of Sherburn-in-Elmet in the West Riding of the County of York		11 August 1977
7 June 1966	Frank Soskice ‡	Baron Stow Hill	of Newport in the County of Monmouth		1 January 1979
9 June 1966	George Pargiter ‡	Baron Pargiter	of Southall in the London Borough of Ealing		16 January 1982
10 June 1966	Sir Martin Redmayne, Bt. ‡	Baron Redmayne	of Rushcliffe in the County of Nottingham		28 April 1983
13 June 1966	Thomas Jones ‡	Baron Maelor	of Rhosllanerchrugog in the County of Denbigh		18 November 1984
15 June 1966	Walter Monslow ‡	Baron Monslow	of Barrow-in-Furness in the County Palatine of Lancaster		12 October 1966
16 June 1966	Sir Samuel Storey, Bt. ‡	Baron Buckton	of Settrington in the East Riding of the County of York		17 January 1978
23 June 1966	Arthur Moyle ‡	Baron Moyle	of Llanidloes in the County of Montgomery		23 December 1974
24 June 1966	William McFadzean	Baron McFadzean	of Woldingham in the County of Surrey		14 January 1996
4 July 1966	John Hunt	Baron Hunt	of Llanvair Waterdine in the County of Salop		8 November 1998
5 July 1966	Ritchie Calder	Baron Ritchie-Calder	of Balmashannar in the Royal Burgh of Forfar		31 January 1982
11 July 1966	Jack Cooper ‡	Baron Cooper of Stockton Heath	of Stockton Heath in the County Palatine of Chester		2 September 1988
20 July 1966	Henry Brooke ‡	Baron Brooke of Cumnor	of Cumnor in the Royal County of Berks		29 March 1984
19 September 1966	Evelyn Sharp	Baroness Sharp	of Hornsey in Greater London		1 September 1985
16 January 1967	Sir Robert Platt, Bt.	Baron Platt	of Grindleford in the County of Derby		30 June 1978
17 January 1967	Charles Morris	Baron Morris of Grasmere	of Grasmere in the County of Westmorland		30 May 1990
18 January 1967	Harold Woolley	Baron Woolley	of Hatton in the County Palatine of Chester		31 July 1986
19 January 1967	Willis Jackson	Baron Jackson of Burnley	of Burnley in the County Palatine of Lancaster		17 February 1970
20 January 1967	Beatrice Serota	Baroness Serota	of Hampstead in Greater London		21 October 2002
6 February 1967	Sir George MacLeod, Bt.	Baron MacLeod of Fuinary	of Fuinary in Morven in the County of Argyll		27 June 1991
6 July 1967	John Redcliffe-Maud	Baron Redcliffe-Maud	of the City and County of Bristol		20 November 1982
7 July 1967	William Penney	Baron Penney	of East Hendred in the Royal County of Berks		3 March 1991
10 July 1967	Llewellyn Heycock	Baron Heycock	of Taibach in the Borough of Port Talbot		13 March 1990
11 July 1967	William Carron	Baron Carron	of the City and County of Kingston upon Hull		3 December 1969
25 August 1967	Ifor Evans	Baron Evans of Hungershall	of the Borough of Royal Tunbridge Wells		28 August 1982
26 August 1967	Alan Mais	Baron Mais	of Walbrook in the City of London		28 November 1993
29 August 1967	Pat Llewelyn-Davies, Lady Llewelyn-Davies	Baroness Llewelyn-Davies of Hastoe	of Hastoe in the County of Hertford		6 November 1997
30 August 1967	Desmond Hirshfield	Baron Hirshfield	of Holborn in Greater London		6 December 1993
11 September 1967	Frank McLeavy ‡	Baron McLeavy	of the City of Bradford		1 October 1976
12 September 1967	Edgar Granville ‡	Baron Granville of Eye	of Eye in the County of Suffolk		14 February 1998
14 September 1967	David Urquhart	Baron Tayside	of Queens Well in the Royal Burgh of Forfar and County of Angus		12 March 1975
15 September 1967	Alma Birk	Baroness Birk	of Regent's Park in Greater London		29 December 1996
18 September 1967	Bill Fiske	Baron Fiske	of Brent in Greater London		13 January 1975
19 September 1967	Charles Garnsworthy	Baron Garnsworthy	of Reigate in the County of Surrey		5 September 1974
20 September 1967	Herbert Bowden ‡	Baron Aylestone	of Aylestone in the City of Leicester		30 April 1994
21 September 1967	Ted Hill	Baron Hill of Wivenhoe	of Wivenhoe in the County of Essex		14 December 1969
22 September 1967	Harry Douglass	Baron Douglass of Cleveland	of Cleveland in the County of York		5 April 1978
13 October 1967	Charles Delacourt-Smith ‡	Baron Delacourt-Smith	of New Windsor in the Royal County of Berks		2 August 1972
20 November 1967	Jack Donaldson	Baron Donaldson of Kingsbridge	of Kingsbridge in the County of Buckingham		8 March 1998
27 November 1967	George Wigg ‡	Baron Wigg	of the Borough of Dudley		11 August 1983
29 November 1967	John Foot	Baron Foot	of Buckland Monachorum in the County of Devon		11 October 1999
4 December 1967	Peter Thorneycroft ‡	Baron Thorneycroft	of Dunston in the County of Stafford		4 June 1994
5 December 1967	John Bannerman	Baron Bannerman of Kildonan	of Kildonan in the County of Sutherland		10 May 1969
6 December 1967	Tim Beaumont (Note: In remainder to the Barony of Allendale (United Kingdom).)	Baron Beaumont of Whitley	of Child's Hill in Greater London		9 April 2008
18 January 1968	Harry Pilkington	Baron Pilkington	of St Helens in the County Palatine of Lancaster		22 December 1983
19 January 1968	Michael Berry (Note: Formerly the 3rd Viscount Camrose, disclaimed that title in 1995.)	Baron Hartwell	of Peterborough Court in the City of London		3 April 2001
22 January 1968	Lewis Wright	Baron Wright of Ashton under Lyne	of Ashton-under-Lyne in the County Palatine of Lancaster		15 September 1974
29 January 1968	Thomas Taylor	Baron Taylor of Gryfe	of Bridge of Weir in the County of Renfrew		13 July 2001
12 February 1968	Humphrey Trevelyan	Baron Trevelyan	of Saint Veep in the County of Cornwall		8 February 1985
21 May 1968	Laurence Helsby	Baron Helsby	of Logmore in the County of Surrey		5 December 1978
20 June 1968	Thomas Balogh	Baron Balogh	of Hampstead in Greater London		20 January 1985
21 June 1968	William Black	Baron Black	of Barrow in Furness in the County Palatine of Lancaster		27 December 1984
28 June 1968	Geoffrey Crowther	Baron Crowther	of Headingley in the West Riding of the County of York		5 February 1972
10 July 1968	William Evans	Baron Energlyn	of Caerphilly in the County of Glamorgan		27 June 1985
11 July 1968	John Jacques	Baron Jacques	of Portsea Island in the County of Southampton		20 December 1995
17 September 1968	Ralph Grey	Baron Grey of Naunton	of Naunton in the County of Gloucester		17 October 1999
9 January 1969	Donald Stokes	Baron Stokes	of Leyland in the County Palatine of Lancaster		21 July 2008
27 January 1969	Patrick Blackett	Baron Blackett	of Chelsea in Greater London		13 July 1974
21 February 1969	Saville Garner	Baron Garner	of Chiddingly in the County of Sussex		10 December 1983
3 March 1969	Henry Wilson	Baron Wilson of Langside	of Broughton in the County and City of Edinburgh		23 November 1997
24 March 1969	Learie Constantine	Baron Constantine	of Maraval in Trinidad and Tobago and of Nelson in the County Palatine of Lancaster		1 July 1971
2 July 1969	Paul Gore-Booth	Baron Gore-Booth	of Maltby in the West Riding of the County of York		29 June 1984
3 July 1969	Sidney Bernstein	Baron Bernstein	of Leigh in the County of Kent		5 February 1993
24 July 1969	Kenneth Clark	Baron Clark	of Saltwood in the County of Kent		21 May 1983
28 October 1969	Robert Hall	Baron Roberthall	of Silverspur in the State of Queensland and Commonwealth of Australia and of Trenance in the County of Cornwall		17 September 1988
16 January 1970	John Beavan	Baron Ardwick	of Barnes in the London Borough of Richmond upon Thames		18 August 1994
23 January 1970	Terence O'Neill (Note: In remainder to the Barony of O'Neill (United Kingdom).)	Baron O'Neill of the Maine	of Ahoghill in the County of Antrim		12 June 1990
5 February 1970	Frank Kearton	Baron Kearton	of Whitchurch in the County of Buckingham		2 July 1992
12 February 1970	Susan Cunliffe-Lister, Lady Masham	Baroness Masham of Ilton	of Masham in the North Riding of the County of York		12 March 2023

‡ former MP

== Edward Heath (1970–1974) ==
Living but left the House of Lords

Date of creation	Name	Title	Territorial qualification	Date of retirement (if applicable)	Date of extinction (if applicable)
19 June 1970	Manny Shinwell ‡	Baron Shinwell	of Easington in the County of Durham		8 May 1986
20 June 1970	Barnett Janner ‡	Baron Janner	of the City of Leicester		4 May 1982
30 June 1970	Quintin Hogg ‡ (Note: Formerly the 2nd Viscount Hailsham, disclaimed that title in 1963.)	Baron Hailsham of Saint Marylebone	of Herstmonceux in the County of Sussex		12 October 2001
1 July 1970	Priscilla Buchan, Lady Tweedsmuir ‡	Baroness Tweedsmuir of Belhelvie	of Potterton in the County of Aberdeen		11 March 1978
2 July 1970	Sir John Vaughan-Morgan, Bt. ‡	Baron Reigate	of Outwood in the County of Surrey		26 January 1995
3 July 1970	Sir Edward Boyle, Bt. ‡	Baron Boyle of Handsworth	of Salehurst in the County of Sussex		28 September 1981
4 July 1970	James Hoy ‡	Baron Hoy	of Leith in the County of the City of Edinburgh		7 August 1976
6 July 1970	Cyril Hamnett	Baron Hamnett	of Warrington in the County Palatine of Lancaster		17 March 1980
7 July 1970	Nigel Birch ‡	Baron Rhyl	of Holywell in the Parish of Swanmore in the County of Southampton		8 March 1981
8 July 1970	Joseph Slater ‡	Baron Slater	of Ferryhill in the County of Durham		21 April 1977
9 July 1970	Eric Fletcher ‡	Baron Fletcher	of Islington in Greater London		9 June 1990
28 July 1970	John Wheatley, Lord Wheatley ‡	Baron Wheatley	of Shettleston in the County of the City of Glasgow		28 July 1988
31 July 1970	Max Rosenheim	Baron Rosenheim	of the London Borough of Camden		2 December 1972
21 September 1970	Julian Snow ‡	Baron Burntwood	of Burntwood in the County of Stafford		24 January 1982
22 September 1970	Tony Greenwood ‡	Baron Greenwood of Rossendale	of East Mersea in the County of Essex		12 April 1982
25 September 1970	Jack Diamond ‡	Baron Diamond	of the City of Gloucester		3 April 2004
28 September 1970	Harold Davies ‡	Baron Davies of Leek	of Leek in the County of Stafford		28 October 1985
12 October 1970	Eirene White ‡	Baroness White	of Rhymney in the County of Monmouth		23 December 1999
14 October 1970	Alice Bacon ‡	Baroness Bacon	of the City of Leeds and of Normanton in the West Riding of the County of York		24 March 1993
5 November 1970	Jennie Lee ‡	Baroness Lee of Asheridge	of the City of Westminster		16 November 1988
6 November 1970	George Brown ‡	Baron George-Brown	of Jevington in the County of Sussex		2 June 1985
29 January 1971	Miles Thomas	Baron Thomas	of Remenham in the Royal County of Berkshire		8 February 1980
5 February 1971	Jack Simon ‡	Baron Simon of Glaisdale	of Glaisdale in the North Riding of the County of York		7 May 2006
9 February 1971	Sir Charles Maclean, Bt.	Baron Maclean	of Duart and Morven in the County of Argyll		8 February 1990
2 March 1971	Horace King ‡	Baron Maybray-King	of the City of Southampton		3 September 1986
5 March 1971	Laurence Olivier	Baron Olivier	of Brighton in the County of Sussex		11 July 1989
20 April 1971	John Widgery	Baron Widgery	of South Molton in the County of Devon		26 July 1981
30 April 1971	Sir Ian Orr-Ewing, Bt. ‡	Baron Orr-Ewing	of Little Berkhamsted in the County of Hertford		19 August 1999
1 May 1971	Arthur Vere Harvey ‡	Baron Harvey of Prestbury	of Prestbury in the County Palatine of Chester		5 April 1994
17 May 1971	Robert Blake	Baron Blake	of Braydeston in the County of Norfolk		20 September 2003
18 May 1971	Nancy Seear	Baroness Seear	of Paddington in the City of Westminster		23 April 1997
21 May 1971	Simon Mackay	Baron Tanlaw	of Tanlawhill in the County of Dumfries	3 November 2017	
24 May 1971	Janet Young	Baroness Young	of Farnworth in the County Palatine of Lancaster		6 September 2002
4 June 1971	Evelyn Macleod	Baroness Macleod of Borve	of Borve in the Isle of Lewis		17 November 1999
18 June 1971	Solly Zuckerman	Baron Zuckerman	of Burnham Thorpe in the County of Norfolk		1 April 1993
20 July 1971	James Chichester-Clark	Baron Moyola	of Castledawson in the County of Londonderry		17 May 2002
20 April 1972	Michael Adeane	Baron Adeane	of Stamfordham in the County of Northumberland		30 April 1984
24 April 1972	Leslie Hale ‡	Baron Hale	of Oldham in the County Palatine of Lancaster		9 May 1985
26 April 1972	Thomas Hewlett	Baron Hewlett	of Swettenham in the County of Chester		2 July 1979
28 April 1972	Frederic Seebohm	Baron Seebohm	of Hertford in the County of Hertford		15 December 1990
1 May 1972	John Boyd-Carpenter ‡	Baron Boyd-Carpenter	of Crux Easton in the County of Southampton		11 July 1998
2 May 1972	Diana Elles	Baroness Elles	of the City of Westminster		17 October 2009
9 May 1972	Charles Elworthy	Baron Elworthy	of Timaru in New Zealand and of Elworthy in the County of Somerset		4 April 1993
10 May 1972	Tudor Watkins ‡	Baron Watkins	of Glyntawe in the County of Brecknock		2 November 1983
3 July 1972	Harold Samuel	Baron Samuel of Wych Cross	of Wych Cross in the County of Sussex		28 August 1987
10 July 1972	Bernard Fergusson	Baron Ballantrae	of Auchairne in the County of Ayr and of the Bay of Islands in New Zealand		28 November 1980
5 February 1973	Sir Arthur Porritt, Bt.	Baron Porritt	of Wanganui in New Zealand and of Hampstead in Greater London		1 January 1994
14 March 1973	Leslie O'Brien	Baron O'Brien of Lothbury	of the City of London		24 November 1995
18 June 1973	Pamela Sharples	Baroness Sharples	of Chawton in Hampshire	18 December 2017	19 May 2022
22 June 1973	Desmond Brayley	Baron Brayley	of the City of Cardiff in the County of Glamorgan		16 March 1977
25 June 1973	John Hunt	Baron Hunt of Fawley	of Fawley in the County of Buckingham		28 December 1987
29 June 1973	Rhys Lloyd	Baron Lloyd of Kilgerran	of Llanwenog in the County of Cardigan		30 January 1991
6 July 1973	Eric Ashby	Baron Ashby	of Brandon in the County of Suffolk		22 October 1992
9 July 1973	Norman Crowther Hunt	Baron Crowther-Hunt	of Eccleshill in the West Riding of the County of York		16 February 1987
16 July 1973	Robert Allan ‡	Baron Allan of Kilmahew	of Cardross in the County of Dunbarton		4 April 1979
31 January 1974	Denis Greenhill	Baron Greenhill of Harrow	of the Royal Borough of Kensington and Chelsea		8 November 2000

‡ former MP

== Harold Wilson (1974–1976) ==
Date of creation	Name	Title	Territorial qualification	Date of retirement (if applicable)	Date of extinction
6 March 1974	Vic Feather	Baron Feather	of the City of Bradford		28 July 1976
7 March 1974	Burke Trend	Baron Trend	of Greenwich in Greater London		21 July 1987
11 March 1974	Elwyn Jones ‡	Baron Elwyn-Jones	of Llanelli in the County of Carmarthen and of Newham in Greater London		4 December 1989
25 March 1974	Goronwy Roberts ‡	Baron Goronwy-Roberts	of Caernarvon and of Ogwen in the County of Caernarvon		22 July 1981
26 March 1974	John Harris	Baron Harris of Greenwich	of Greenwich in Greater London		11 April 2001
2 May 1974	Duncan Sandys ‡	Baron Duncan-Sandys	of the City of Westminster		26 November 1987
3 May 1974	Michael Noble ‡	Baron Glenkinglas	of Cairndow in the County of Argyll		15 May 1984
6 May 1974	Geoffrey Lloyd ‡	Baron Geoffrey-Lloyd	of Broomfield in the County of Kent (Note: There are two places in Kent called Broomfield: Broomfield, Herne Bay and Broomfield, Maidstone. While the official record does not say which one this is, the Dictionary of National Biography mentions Geoffrey-Lloyd's 'long connection' with Olive, Lady Baillie and Leeds Castle, which is near Maidstone.)		12 September 1984
7 May 1974	Tufton Beamish ‡	Baron Chelwood	of Lewes in the County of East Sussex		6 April 1989
8 May 1974	Ernest Marples ‡	Baron Marples	of Wallasey in the County of Merseyside		6 July 1978
9 May 1974	Robin Turton ‡	Baron Tranmire	of Upsall in the County of North Yorkshire		17 January 1994
10 May 1974	George Mackie ‡	Baron Mackie of Benshie	of Kirriemuir in the County of Angus		17 February 2015
13 May 1974	Patricia Hornsby-Smith ‡	Baroness Hornsby-Smith	of Chislehurst in Greater London		3 July 1985
14 May 1974	Inga-Stina Robson	Baroness Robson of Kiddington	of Kiddington in Oxfordshire		9 February 1999
15 May 1974	Mervyn Pike ‡	Baroness Pike	of Melton in Leicestershire		11 January 2004
16 May 1974	Basil Wigoder	Baron Wigoder	of Cheetham in the City of Manchester		12 August 2004
11 June 1974	Michael Fraser	Baron Fraser of Kilmorack	of Rubislaw in the County of the City of Aberdeen		1 July 1996
18 June 1974	Edward Castle	Baron Castle	of Islington in Greater London		26 December 1979
19 June 1974	Samuel Fisher	Baron Fisher of Camden	of Camden in Greater London		12 October 1979
20 June 1974	Douglas Houghton ‡	Baron Houghton of Sowerby	of Sowerby in the County of West Yorkshire		2 May 1996
21 June 1974	Charles Pannell ‡	Baron Pannell	of the City of Leeds		23 March 1980
24 June 1974	Robert Grant-Ferris ‡	Baron Harvington	of Nantwich in Cheshire		1 January 1997
25 June 1974	Phyllis Stedman	Baroness Stedman	of Longthorpe in the City of Peterborough		8 June 1996
26 June 1974	Peter Lovell-Davis	Baron Lovell-Davis	of Highgate in Greater London		6 January 2001
27 June 1974	Harry Kissin	Baron Kissin	of Camden in Greater London		22 November 1997
28 June 1974	George Wallace	Baron Wallace of Campsie	of Newlands in the County of the City of Glasgow		23 December 1997
1 July 1974	Frederick Lee ‡	Baron Lee of Newton	of Newton in the County of Merseyside		4 February 1984
2 July 1974	Doris Fisher ‡	Baroness Fisher of Rednal	of Rednal in the City of Birmingham		18 December 2005
3 July 1974	George Darling ‡	Baron Darling of Hillsborough	of Crewe in Cheshire		18 October 1985
4 July 1974	Patrick Gordon Walker ‡	Baron Gordon-Walker	of Leyton in Greater London		2 December 1980
5 July 1974	Margaret Delacourt-Smith, Lady Delacourt-Smith	Baroness Delacourt-Smith of Alteryn	of Alteryn in the County of Gwent		8 June 2010
8 July 1974	Elfed Davies ‡	Baron Davies of Penrhys	of Rhondda in the County of Mid Glamorgan		28 April 1992
9 July 1974	Nicholas Kaldor	Baron Kaldor	of Newnham in the City of Cambridge		30 September 1986
10 July 1974	Alfred Allen	Baron Allen of Fallowfield	of Fallowfield in Greater Manchester		14 January 1985
11 July 1974	Marcia Falkender	Baroness Falkender	of West Haddon in Northamptonshire		6 February 2019
12 July 1974	John Wolfenden	Baron Wolfenden	of Westcott in the County of Surrey		18 January 1985
2 September 1974	William Alexander	Baron Alexander of Potterhill	of Paisley in the County of Renfrew		8 September 1993
18 November 1974	Michael Ramsey	Baron Ramsey of Canterbury	of Canterbury in the County of Kent		23 April 1988
19 December 1974	Alec Douglas-Home ‡ (Note: Formerly the 14th Earl of Home, disclaimed that title in 1963.)	Baron Home of the Hirsel	of Coldstream in the County of Berwick		9 October 1995
2 January 1975	Reginald Paget ‡	Baron Paget of Northampton	of Lubenham in Leicestershire		2 January 1990
3 January 1975	Arnold Silverstone	Baron Ashdown	of Chelwood in the County of East Sussex		23 July 1977
6 January 1975	Anthony Barber ‡	Baron Barber	of Wentbridge in West Yorkshire		16 December 2005
7 January 1975	Desmond Banks	Baron Banks	of Kenton in Greater London		15 June 1997
8 January 1975	Hugh Cudlipp	Baron Cudlipp	of Aldingbourne in the County of West Sussex		17 May 1998
9 January 1975	Gordon Campbell ‡	Baron Campbell of Croy	of Croy in the County of Nairn		26 April 2005
10 January 1975	Sir Harmar Nicholls, Bt. ‡	Baron Harmar-Nicholls	of Peterborough in Cambridgeshire		15 September 2000
14 January 1975	Alfred Wilson	Baron Wilson of Radcliffe	of Radcliffe in Lancashire		25 January 1983
15 January 1975	Mary Stewart	Baroness Stewart of Alvechurch	of Fulham in Greater London		28 December 1984
16 January 1975	Richard Briginshaw	Baron Briginshaw	of Southwark in Greater London		27 March 1992
17 January 1975	George Wallace ‡	Baron Wallace of Coslany	of Coslany in the City of Norwich		11 November 2003
20 January 1975	Donald Bruce ‡	Baron Bruce of Donington	of Rickmansworth in Hertfordshire		18 April 2005
21 January 1975	Sidney Greene	Baron Greene of Harrow Weald	of Harrow in Greater London		26 July 2004
22 January 1975	Dennis Lyons	Baron Lyons of Brighton	of Brighton in the County of East Sussex		18 January 1978
23 January 1975	Irene Ward ‡	Baroness Ward of North Tyneside	of North Tyneside in the County of Tyne and Wear		26 April 1980
24 January 1975	Robert Lindsay, Lord Balniel ‡ (Note: SSucceeded as 29th Earl of Crawford later in 1975.)	Baron Balniel	of Pitcorthie in the County of Fife	28 November 2019	18 March 2023
27 January 1975	Joan Vickers ‡	Baroness Vickers	of Devonport in the County of Devon		23 May 1994
28 January 1975	Rudy Sternberg	Baron Plurenden	of Plurenden Manor in the County of Kent		5 January 1978
29 January 1975	William Armstrong	Baron Armstrong of Sanderstead	of the City of Westminster		12 July 1980
30 January 1975	Derek Pritchard	Baron Pritchard	of West Haddon in Northamptonshire		16 October 1995
31 January 1975	Patrick Gibson	Baron Gibson	of Penn's Rocks in the County of East Sussex		20 April 2004
3 February 1975	David Pitt	Baron Pitt of Hampstead	of Hampstead in Greater London and of Hampstead in Grenada		18 December 1994
10 July 1975	Leslie Lever ‡	Baron Lever	of Ardwick in the City of Manchester		26 July 1977
11 July 1975	John Gregson	Baron Gregson	of Stockport in Greater Manchester		12 August 2009
14 July 1975	William Denholm Barnetson	Baron Barnetson	of Crowborough in the County of East Sussex		12 March 1981
15 July 1975	Don Ryder	Baron Ryder of Eaton Hastings	of Eaton Hastings in Oxfordshire		12 May 2003
16 July 1975	Sydney Jacobson	Baron Jacobson	of St Albans in Hertfordshire		13 August 1988
17 July 1975	John Smith	Baron Kirkhill	of Kirkhill in the District of the City of Aberdeen	30 April 2018	21 March 2023
14 January 1976	Raymond Brookes	Baron Brookes	of West Bromwich in the County of West Midlands		31 July 2002
15 January 1976	Robert Carr ‡	Baron Carr of Hadley	of Monken Hadley in Greater London		17 February 2012
16 January 1976	Tom Driberg ‡	Baron Bradwell	of Bradwell juxta Mare in the County of Essex		12 August 1976
19 January 1976	William McCarthy	Baron McCarthy	of Headington in the City of Oxford		18 November 2012
20 January 1976	Donald Chapman ‡	Baron Northfield	of Telford in the County of Salop		26 April 2013
21 January 1976	Gordon Parry	Baron Parry	of Neyland in the County of Dyfed		1 September 2004
22 January 1976	Albert Oram ‡	Baron Oram	of Brighton in the County of East Sussex		4 September 1999
23 January 1976	Michael Winstanley ‡	Baron Winstanley	of Urmston in Greater Manchester		18 July 1993
26 January 1976	Lucy Faithfull	Baroness Faithfull	of Wolvercote in the County of Oxfordshire		13 March 1996
27 January 1976	Frank Schon	Baron Schon	of Whitehaven in the County of Cumbria		7 January 1995
29 January 1976	Thomas Brimelow	Baron Brimelow	of Tyldesley in the County of Lancashire		2 August 1995
30 January 1976	Alan Bullock	Baron Bullock	of Leafield in the County of Oxfordshire		2 February 2004
3 February 1976	Paul Wilson	Baron Wilson of High Wray	of Kendal in the County of Cumbria		24 February 1980
5 February 1976	John Wall	Baron Wall	of Coombe in Greater London		29 December 1980
8 March 1976	Selwyn Lloyd ‡	Baron Selwyn-Lloyd	of Wirral in the County of Merseyside		17 May 1978

‡ former MP

== James Callaghan (1976–1979) ==
Date of creation	Name	Title	Territorial qualification	Date of retirement (if applicable)	Date of extinction
22 June 1976	Lew Grade	Baron Grade	of Elstree in the County of Hertfordshire		13 December 1998
23 June 1976	John Vaizey	Baron Vaizey	of Greenwich in Greater London		19 July 1984
24 June 1976	Joseph Stone	Baron Stone	of Hendon in Greater London		17 July 1986
25 June 1976	George Weidenfeld	Baron Weidenfeld	of Chelsea in Greater London		20 January 2016
28 June 1976	Albert Murray ‡	Baron Murray of Gravesend	of Gravesend in the County of Kent		10 February 1980
29 June 1976	Bernard Delfont	Baron Delfont	of Stepney in Greater London		28 July 1994
30 June 1976	Joseph Kagan	Baron Kagan	of Elland in the County of West Yorkshire		17 January 1995
1 July 1976	Terence Boston ‡	Baron Boston of Faversham	of Faversham in the County of Kent		23 July 2011
2 July 1976	Benjamin Britten	Baron Britten	of Aldeburgh in the County of Suffolk		4 December 1976
12 July 1976	Philip Allen	Baron Allen of Abbeydale	of the City of Sheffield		27 November 2007
19 July 1976	Asa Briggs	Baron Briggs	of Lewes in the County of East Sussex		15 March 2016
2 August 1976	Max Rayne	Baron Rayne	of Prince's Meadow in Greater London		10 October 2003
23 September 1976	Fred Peart ‡	Baron Peart	of Workington in the County of Cumbria		26 August 1988
29 September 1976	John McCluskey	Baron McCluskey	of Churchhill in the District of the City of Edinburgh	1 March 2017	20 July 2017
18 October 1976	Barbara Ward	Baroness Jackson of Lodsworth	of Lodsworth in the County of West Sussex		31 May 1981
28 January 1977	Edward Short ‡	Baron Glenamara	of Glenridding in the County of Cumbria		4 May 2012
1 February 1977	John Baker	Baron Baker	of Windrush in the County of Gloucestershire		9 September 1985
7 February 1977	Brian Faulkner	Baron Faulkner of Downpatrick	of Downpatrick in the County of Down		3 March 1977
8 February 1977	Morrice James	Baron Saint Brides	of Hasguard in the County of Dyfed		26 November 1989
23 March 1977	George Thomson ‡	Baron Thomson of Monifieth	of Monifieth in the District of the City of Dundee		3 October 2008
15 July 1977	Michael Carver	Baron Carver	of Shackleford in the County of Surrey		9 December 2001
18 July 1977	Pratap Chitnis	Baron Chitnis	of Ryedale in the County of North Yorkshire		12 July 2013
19 July 1977	Eric Roll	Baron Roll of Ipsden	of Ipsden in the County of Oxfordshire		30 March 2005
20 July 1977	Bill Wedderburn	Baron Wedderburn of Charlton	of Highgate in Greater London		9 March 2012
22 July 1977	Philip Noel-Baker ‡	Baron Noel-Baker	of the City of Derby		8 October 1982
7 February 1978	Martin Charteris (Note: In remainder to the Earldom of Wemyss and March (Scotland).)	Baron Charteris of Amisfield	of Amisfield in the District of East Lothian		23 December 1999
8 February 1978	Douglas Allen	Baron Croham	of the London Borough of Croydon		11 September 2011
9 February 1978	Oliver McGregor	Baron McGregor of Durris	of Hampstead in Greater London		10 November 1997
27 February 1978	Betty Lockwood	Baroness Lockwood	of Dewsbury in the County of West Yorkshire	18 May 2017	29 April 2019
20 March 1978	Michael Young	Baron Young of Dartington	of Dartington in the County of Devon		14 January 2002
14 April 1978	Arthur Cockfield	Baron Cockfield	of Dover in the County of Kent		8 January 2007
17 April 1978	Peter Rawlinson ‡	Baron Rawlinson of Ewell	of Ewell in the County of Surrey		28 June 2006
19 April 1978	Christopher Soames ‡	Baron Soames	of Fletching in the County of East Sussex		16 September 1987
21 April 1978	William Howie ‡	Baron Howie of Troon	of Troon in the District of Kyle and Carrick		26 May 2018
24 April 1978	Gruffydd Evans	Baron Evans of Claughton	of Claughton in the County of Merseyside		22 March 1992
26 April 1978	Derek Page ‡	Baron Whaddon	of Whaddon in the County of Cambridgeshire		16 August 2005
28 April 1978	Nora David	Baroness David	of Romsey in the City of Cambridge		29 November 2009
2 May 1978	John Leonard	Baron Leonard	of the City of Cardiff in the County of South Glamorgan		17 July 1983
3 May 1978	William Sefton	Baron Sefton of Garston	of Garston in the County of Merseyside		9 September 2001
4 May 1978	Tom Taylor	Baron Taylor of Blackburn	of Blackburn in the County of Lancashire		25 November 2016
5 May 1978	John Hatch	Baron Hatch of Lusby	of Oldfield in the County of West Yorkshire		11 October 1992
9 May 1978	Cyril Plant	Baron Plant	of Benenden in the County of Kent		9 August 1986
10 May 1978	Victor Mishcon	Baron Mishcon	of Lambeth in Greater London		28 January 2006
11 May 1978	Aubrey Buxton	Baron Buxton of Alsa	of Stiffkey in the County of Norfolk		1 September 2009
16 May 1978	Jeremy Hutchinson	Baron Hutchinson of Lullington	of Lullington in the County of East Sussex	3 October 2011	13 November 2017
19 May 1978	Alexander Mitchell Donnet	Baron Donnet of Balgay	of Balgay in the District of the City of Dundee		15 May 1985
10 July 1978	Evelyn Denington	Baroness Denington	of Stevenage in the County of Hertfordshire		22 August 1998
13 July 1978	Rodney Smith	Baron Smith	of Marlow in the County of Buckinghamshire		1 July 1998
17 July 1978	Robert Hunter	Baron Hunter of Newington	of Newington in the District of the City of Edinburgh		24 March 1994
18 July 1978	Paul Reilly	Baron Reilly	of Brompton in the Royal Borough of Kensington and Chelsea		11 October 1990
21 July 1978	William Blease	Baron Blease	of Cromac in the City of Belfast		16 May 2008
31 January 1979	Sue Ryder	Baroness Ryder of Warsaw	of Warsaw in Poland and of Cavendish in the County of Suffolk		2 November 2000
2 February 1979	Sir John Richardson, Bt.	Baron Richardson	of Lee in the County of Devon		15 August 2004
5 February 1979	Peter Hill-Norton	Baron Hill-Norton	of South Nutfield in the County of Surrey		16 May 2004
7 February 1979	Bernard Miles	Baron Miles	of Blackfriars in the City of London		14 June 1991
9 February 1979	Walter Perry	Baron Perry of Walton	of Walton in the County of Buckinghamshire		17 July 2003
19 February 1979	Hugh Scanlon	Baron Scanlon	of Davyhulme in the County of Greater Manchester		27 January 2004
20 February 1979	Brian Flowers	Baron Flowers	of Queen's Gate in the City of Westminster		25 June 2010

‡ former MP

== See also ==
- List of life peerages (complete list of life peerages granted since 1958)
- List of hereditary peers in the House of Lords by virtue of a life peerage
