= List of presidents of Co-operative Congress =

The President of Co-operative Congress has been a prominent position in the British co-operative movement. Co-operative Congress is the national conference for the movement.

Beginning with the first modern Congress in 1869, a Congress president was elected to preside over the event: to begin with, a president was elected for each day of Congress, but from 1896 a single president was elected for the whole event. Being president was considered the highest honour in the UK Co-operative Movement, with societies nominating individuals for the position in recognition of their contribution to the movement. The President was presented with a commemorative medal, and gave a keynote address to the conference.

The Congress voted to abolish the position of president in 2007, with Alan Gill (former chief executive of Leeds Co-operative Society) being the last to serve in the position.

== Congress presidents (1869–1895) ==
Year/Location	Presidents	Society/Location/Affiliation	Delegates
1869 London	Thomas Hughes MP (day 1); Anthony Mundella MP (day 2); Walter Morrison MP (day 3); Hon Auberon Herbert (day 4)	Activist (Political) (London) (Political)	107
1870 Manchester	Walter Morrison MP (day 1); Rev. W. Nassau Molesworth (day 2); John Tomlinson Hibbert MP (day 3); Lloyd Jones (day 4)	Political; Vicar of Spotland, Rochdale (Political); Activist	109
1871 Birmingham	Hon. Auberon Herbert MP (day 1); Charles C. Cattell (day 2); Walter Morrison MP (day 3 & 4)	Political (Birmingham) (London)	113
1872 Bolton	Thomas Hughes MP (day 1); Edward Vansittart Neale (day 2); Lloyd Jones (day 3)	Activist; Co-operative Union; Activist	183
1873 Newcastle upon Tyne	Joseph Cowen, Jun (day 1); Dr John Hunter Rutherford (day 2); Thomas Hughes MP (day 3)	(Proprietor, Newcastle Chronicle); Ouseburn Engine Works; Activist	199
1874 Halifax	Thomas Brassey MP (day 1); Walter Morrison (day 2 & 3)	Political (Late MP for Plymouth)	189
1875 London	Prof. Thorold Rogers (day 1); Thomas Hughes QC (day 2); Walter Morrison (day 3)	University of Oxford; Activist (London)	114
1876 Glasgow	Professor Edward Caird (day 1); George Anderson MP(day 2); Mr Crabtree (day 3)	Glasgow University (MP for Glasgow) (Hebden Bridge)	116
1877 Leicester	Hon. Auberon Herbert (day 1); Lloyd Jones (day 2); Abraham Greenwood (day 3)	Political; Activist; CWS	162
1878 Manchester	Marquess of Ripon (day 1); James Fraser, Bishop of Manchester (day 2); Dr. John Watts (day 3)	Honoured Guest; Honoured Guest; Activist	273
1879 Gloucester	Professor James Stuart (day 1); John Thomas Whitehead Mitchell (day 2); Mr Crabtree (day 3)	Cambridge University; CWS; Rochdale; Hebden Bridge	131
1880 Newcastle upon Tyne	Joseph Barber Lightfoot, Bishop of Durham (day 1); R.S. Watson (day 2); H.R. Bailey (day 3)	Honoured Guest (Solicitor, Newcastle); Co-op Printing, Manchester	174
1881 Leeds	Lord Derby (day 1); Thomas Hughes QC (day 2); James Crabtree (day 3)	Honoured Guest; Activist; North Western Section (possibly Hebden Bridge)	310
1882 Oxford	Lord Reay (day 1); Cllr Henry Pumphrey (day 2); George Hines (day 3)	Honoured Guest; Lewes Building; Ipswich	294
1883 Edinburgh	Rt. Hon. William Edward Baxter MP (day 1); William Maxwell (day 2); John Allan (day 3)	Political (MP for Montrose); SCWS (Glasgow)	394
1884 Derby	Sedley Taylor, MA (day 1); Amos Scotton (day 2); J. Hartley (day 3)	(Trinity College, Cambridge) (Derby); Lincoln	454
1885 Oldham	Lloyd Jones (day 1); Frank Hardern (day 2); Lewis Feber (day 3)	Activist; Oldham Industrial; Oldham Equitable	578
1886 Plymouth	Earl of Morley (day 1); Arthur Dyke Acland MP (day 2); J. H. Young (day 3)	Honoured Guest; Political; Oxford University; Plymouth	406
1887 Carlisle	George Holyoake (day 1); Sir Wilfrid Lawson MP (day 2); Councillor Rule (day 3)	Activist; Honoured Guest (Carlisle) (Gateshead)	464
1888 Dewsbury	Edward Vansittart Neale (day 1); Marquess of Ripon (day 2); John Cave (day 3)	Co-operative Union; Honoured Guest; Dewsbury	581
1889 Ipswich	Professor Alfred Marshall (day 1); Ben Jones (day 2); George Hines (day 3)	Cambridge University (London); Ipswich	435
1890 Glasgow	Earl of Rosebery (day 1); William Maxwell (day 2); James Deans (day 3)	Honoured Guest; SCWS; Kilmarnock	654
1891 Lincoln	Arthur Dyke Acland MP (day 1); Duncan McInnes (day 2); Joseph Hepworth (day 3)	Political; Lincoln; Coventry Watchmakers	580
1892 Rochdale	John Thomas Whitehead Mitchell, JP (day 1); Abraham Greenwood (day 2); T. Cheetham (day 3)	CWS; Rochdale; CWS; Rochdale	871
1893 Bristol	Councillor George Hawkins (day 1); Joseph Clay (day 2); William Henry Brown (day 3)	Oxford; CWS London Branch (Gloucester) (Newport)	645
1894 Sunderland	Thomas Tweddell, JP (day 1); James McKendrick (day 2); William Crooks (day 3)	Hartlepool; CWS Newcastle Branch (Newcastle) (Blaydon)	722
1895 Huddersfield	George Thomson (day 1); Thomas Bland JP (day 2); James Broadbent (day 3)	William Thomson Industrial Partnership, Huddersfield (Huddersfield); Huddersfield Industrial	849

== Congress presidents (1896–1944) ==
Year/Location	President	Society/Location/Affiliation	Delegates
1896 Woolwich	Ben Jones	Parliamentary Secretary; Tenant Co-operators; London CWS	900
1897 Perth	William Maxwell, JP	SCWS	1000
1898 Peterborough	Duncan McInnes	Lincoln	932
1899 Liverpool	Frank Hardern, JP	Oldham Industrial	1205
1900 Cardiff	William Henry Brown	Newport	1027
1901 Middlesbrough	Joseph Warwick	North Shields	1138
1902 Exeter	George Hawkins	Oxford; CWS London Branch	1006
1903 Doncaster	John Shillito	CWS; Halifax	1150
1904 Stratford	Alfred Golightly	Stratford (London)	1376
1905 Paisley	William Maxwell	SCWS	1318
1906 Birmingham	J. C. Gray, JP	Co-operative Union	1320
1907 Preston	William Lander	Bolton	1492
1908 Newport	Thomas William Allen	Blaina	1334
1909 Newcastle upon Tyne	W. R. Rae	Sunderland	1556
1910 Plymouth	Henry Wilkins	Plymouth	1442
1911 Bradford	George Thorpe	Dewsbury	1615
1912 Portsmouth	William Openshaw	CWS London	1489
1913 Aberdeen	James Deans	Kilmarnock	1247
1914 Dublin	Robert Fleming	Belfast	1367
1915 Leicester	George Bastard	Leicester	1410
1916 Lancaster	William Gregory, JP	Preston	1345
1917 Swansea	E. R. Wood	Ton	1044
1918 Liverpool	Thomas Killon	CWS	1268
1919 Carlisle	Fred Hayward	Burslem	1559
1920 Bristol	G. A. Ramsay, BA	(West Country)	1669
1921 Scarborough	George Major	Rotherham	1515
1922 Brighton	Margaret Davies	Co-operative Women's Guild	1411
1923 Edinburgh	Robert Stewart	SCWS	1571
1924 Nottingham	Chas Saxton	Worcester	1546
1925 Southport	W. E. Dudley, JP	CWS	1709
1926 Belfast	William James McGuffin, JP	Belfast	1411
1927 Cheltenham	J. T. Jackson	Gloucester	1734
1928 Hartlepool	Alfred Whitehead	Co-operative Union	1662
1929 Torquay	Henry May, OBE, JP	ICA; Royal Arsenal; Co-operative Printing	1558
1930 York	Thomas Liddle, MBE, JP	Hartlepools	1572
1931 Bournemouth	William John Salmon, JP	Colchester	1619
1932 Glasgow	John Downie	Wishaw	1633
1933 Birmingham	Joseph Millington, JP	Birmingham	1621
1934 Rhyl	Arthur Pickup	Birkenhead	1734
1935 Cardiff	Wyndham Edwards, JP	(South Wales)	1814
1936 Newcastle upon Tyne	George Riddle, CBE	Carlisle	1772
1937 Bath	E. G. Haskins, JP	Bath	1889
1938 Scarborough	Joseph Worley	Leicester	1944
1939 Margate	William Neville, JP	Royal Arsenal	1957
1940 Glasgow	William Gallacher, JP	SCWS	1517
1941 Edinburgh	Sir Fred Hayward, JP	Burslem	1063
1942 Edinburgh	Neil S. Beaton, JP	SCWS	1263
1943 Edinburgh	Thomas Lawther	Amble	1354
1944	Cancelled on account of War conditions		

== Congress presidents (1945–2007) ==
Year/Location	President	Society/Location/Affiliation	Delegates
1945 Nottingham	Robert Palmer, JP	Co-operative Union	1584
1946 Blackpool	J. Bradshaw, JP	Co-operative Union	1721
1947 Brighton	G.L. Perkins	(Winchester)	1770
1948 Edinburgh	A.J. Tapping	Co-operative Press	1796
1949 Scarborough	Thomas Harry Gill, JP	CWS	1839
1950 Morecambe	J.W. Blower, CBE, JP	Ripley	1978
1951 Blackpool	H. Taylor	Kettering Industrial; Kettering Clothing; CPF	2027
1952 Margate	Lord Williams	CWS	2020
1953 Llandudno	J. Corina	Royal Arsenal	2015
1954 Scarborough	H.J. Twigg	Plymouth	2032
1955 Edinburgh	J.M. Davidson	SCWS	2062
1956 Blackpool	G.R. Doulgas, JP	Birkenhead	2149
1957 Brighton	F. Oakley, BA	Mansfield Sutton	2120
1958 Scarborough	James Peddie MBE	CWS	2127
1958 Blackpool	James Peddie MBE	CWS	1831
1959 Edinburgh	J.A. Stirling, FACCA	SCWS	2137
1960 Blackpool	A.E. Jupp, CSD	CPF	2122
1961 Scarborough	John Jacques, BA(Com), JP	Portsea Island	2106
1962 Blackpool	P.M. Williams, JP	Hartlepools	2119
1963 Douglas	L. Cooke, OBE, JP	CWS	2026
1964 Scarborough	Jack Bailey	Co-operative Party	2029
1965 Edinburgh	D. Shaw, JP, FACCA	St. Cuthbert's	1980
1966 Blackpool	G.L. Armitage, JP, FCA, FCIS	Birmingham	1908
1967 Douglas	H.C. Jennings	CWS	1667
1968 Scarborough	Lord Taylor of Gryfe	SCWS	1583
1969 Blackpool	Robert Southern, CBE, BA(Com), CHD	Co-operative Union	1323
1970 Blackpool	H. Kemp, JP, CSD	CWS	1162
1971 Eastbourne	G. Williams, FACCA	Cambridge	961
1971 London	G. Williams, FACCA	Cambridge	551
1972 Scarborough	A. Wilson, FCIS, FBIM	CWS	917
1973 Portsmouth	B.T. Parry, JP, CMD	Blackburn	876
1974 Llandudno	J.M. Wood, CHD	Parliamentary Committee	924
1975 Edinburgh	Mrs. E.M. Dodds	CWS; CRS	913
1976 Margate	R.L. Marshall, OBE, MA	Co-operative Union; Co-operative College	850
1977 Blackpool	G.R. Gay, JP, DL	St. Cuthbert's	886
1978 Scarborough	Sir Arthur Sugden	CWS	891
1979 Eastbourne	J.H. Perrow, CSD	Bolton & Wigan	1002
1980 Douglas	H. Bailey, CBE	Rushden	857
1981 Edinburgh	H.W. Whitehead, JP	North Eastern	676
1982 Brighton	W.H. Twigg, MBE	Brightside & Carbrook	679
1983 Harrogate	Mrs. N.E. Willis, JP	CRS London	690
1984 Blackpool	Mrs. G. Bunn, JP	Brighton	650
1985 Bournemouth	G. Bromley, JP	Leicestershire	616
1986 Llandudno	W.H. Farrow, CSD	United Co-operatives	588
1987 Harrogate	Ted Graham, Baron Graham of Edmonton	Political	594
1988 Brighton	J. Mason, DL	Blackburn	583
1989 Torquay	F.R. Pashley	Greater Nottingham	571
1990 Glasgow	W.P. Anderson	Central Midlands	559
1991 Llandudno	A. Arlow	Greater Peterborough	561
1992 Scarborough	David Wise OBE	Political; Invicta	548
1993 Portsmouth	George Cunningham	Musselburgh & Fisherrow	583
1994 Rochdale	U.S. Todner MBE	East Mercia	660
1995 Edinburgh	Alf Morris MP	Political	565
1996 Harrogate	G.W. Money, MBE	Yorkshire	560
1997 Cardiff	Pauline Green MEP	Political	543
1998 Lincoln	Alan Middleton	Lincoln	531
1999 Brighton	Bob Burlton	Oxford, Swindon & Gloucester	428
2000 Manchester	Mrs. P. Wheatley	United Norwest Co-operatives	489
2001 Birmingham	Lord Fyfe of Fairfield	Midlands	472
2002 Belfast	Sir Graham Melmoth	the Co-operative Group	
2003 Manchester	Gareth Thomas MP	Co-operative Party	
2004 Manchester	Keith Darwin	The Co-operative Group	
2005 Glasgow	Iain Macdonald	International Co-operative Alliance	
2006 Manchester	Meg Munn MP	Political	
2007 Brighton	Alan Gill	United Co-operatives	
