= Edward Vansittart Neale =

English lawyer and Christian socialist (1810–1892)

Edward Vansittart-Neale
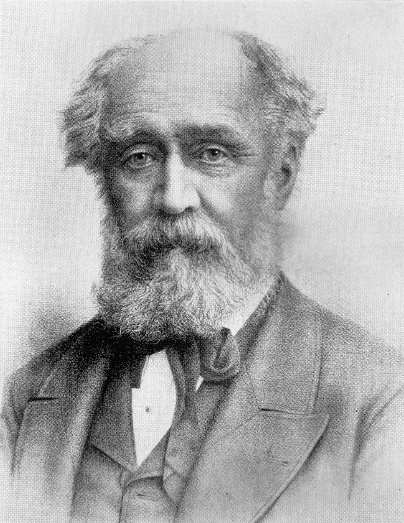
- Born: 2 April 1810; Bath, England
- Died: 16 September 1892 (aged 82); London, England
- Education: Oriel College, Oxford
- Occupation: Barrister
- Office: General Secretary of the Co-operative Union (1873–1891)
- Movement: Christian socialism; co-operative
- Spouse: Frances Sarah Farrer (m. 1837)

Edward Vansittart-Neale (1810–1892) was an English barrister, cooperator, and Christian socialist.

== Early life and education ==
Edward was born on 2 April 1810 in Bath, one of the eight children of Anne (née Spooner) (1780–1873) and Edward Vansittart-Neale (formerly Vansittart), Rector of Taplow in Buckinghamshire. His parents had married in 1809. His maternal grandparents (m. 1770) were Isaac Spooner, a wealthy Birmingham businessman, and Barbara Gough-Calthorpe (c. 1745 – 1826), daughter of Sir Henry Gough, by his second wife Barbara Calthorpe, and sister of Henry Gough-Calthorpe, 1st Baron Calthorpe. One of his maternal aunts was Barbara Wilberforce, who was married to the abolitionist William Wilberforce.

One of his sisters, Charlotte Vansittart Neale (1817–1881), married in 1841 Charles Frere, a barrister and parliamentary clerk, by whom she had nine children, including Charlotte Vansittart Frere (1846–1916), married in 1882 A.G. Folliott-Stokes of St Ives, artist, writer and author of several important books on Cornwall, and had issue.

In 1828, after receiving early education at home, Vansittart-Neale entered Oriel College, Oxford, where he was tutored by John Henry Newman. In 1837 he was called to the bar at Lincoln's Inn.

== Career ==
Vansittart-Neale became a Christian socialist in 1850, and joined the council of the Society for Promoting Working Men's Associations.

With a group of like-minded men, such as F.D. Maurice, Thomas Hughes, John Malcolm Forbes Ludlow, Charles Kingsley, and John Llewelyn Davies, he was an early promoter of the Working Men's College, and taught at its predecessor, the Hall of Association, Castle Street, London.

Vansittart-Neale founded the first co-operative store in London, and advanced capital for two builders' associations, both of which failed. In 1851, though strongly opposed by other members of the promoting council, he started his own initiative, the Central Co-operative Agency, similar to the later Co-operative Wholesale Society. The failure of this scheme, and the Amalgamated Society of Engineers cause in the engineering lock-out of 1852, in which he invested, is said to have cost him £40,000. He was closely associated with the movement which resulted in the Industrial and Provident Societies Act 1876 (39 & 40 Vict. c. 45), and the passing of the Industrial and Provident Societies Act 1862 (25 & 26 Vict. c. 87).

Besides publishing pamphlets on co-operation, he served on an executive committee which developed into the Co-operative Central Board, and took an active part in the 1863 formation of the North of England Co-operative Wholesale Society. He was one of the founders of the Cobden Mills in 1866, and the Agricultural and Horticultural Association in 1867. A promoter of the annual Co-operative Congress, in 1872 he was President of its second day. He became general secretary of the Co-operative Union in 1873.

For many years he was a director of the Co-operative Insurance Company, and a member of the Co-operative Newspaper Society. He visited America in 1875, with a deputation whose object was to open-up direct trade between farmers of the western states and English co-operative stores. After resigning as secretary to the Co-operative Congress Board in 1891, he became a member of the Oxford University branch of the Christian Social Union.

== Personal life ==
Neale married Frances Sarah Farrer in 1837; they had four children: Henrietta, Henry, Constance, and Edith. In later life he inherited his family estate of Bisham Abbey in Berkshire.

Neale died on 16 September 1892 in London. A memorial to Neale was erected in St Paul's Cathedral and a scholarship at Oriel College was endowed in his memory.

Non-profit organization positions
Preceded by Thomas Hughes	President of the Co-operative Congress; 1872	Succeeded by Lloyd Jones
New office	General Secretary of the Co-operative Union; 1873–1891	Succeeded by Jesse Clement Gray
