= David Urquhart (disambiguation) =

David Urquhart (1805–1877) was a Scottish diplomat and writer.

David Urquhart may also refer to:

- David Urquhart (bishop) (born 1952), bishop of Birmingham
- David Urquhart (ice hockey) (born 1984), Canadian ice hockey defenceman and coach
- David Urquhart, Baron Tayside (1912–1975), Scottish businessman and life peer
