= Albert Frost =

British businessman

Albert Edward Frost CBE (7 March 1914 – 13 August 2010) was a British businessman who was an influential and respected figure in the corporate world as finance director of Imperial Chemical Industries (ICI) and a member of the boards of Marks & Spencer, Warburgs, British Airways, British Leyland and British Steel Corporation; he was also a musical philanthropist.

== Early years ==
Albert Edward Frost was born on 7 March 1914 and educated at Oulton School in Liverpool. In his younger days, Frost was a keen swimmer and runner. A long-standing member of the Belgrave Harriers athletics club in Wimbledon, he was remembered for a battling run in deep snow in the 1947 English National Cross Country Championship, in which the club secured second place.

He studied at London University and was called to the bar at Middle Temple. In 1937 he joined the Inland Revenue to train as a tax inspector, and in 1949 was recruited to be deputy head of ICI's tax department. He became treasurer of the group in 1960 before being promoted to finance director – the fourth holder of that post in ICI's short history to have begun his career at the Inland Revenue.

== Career ==
A tax expert by background and a master of financial detail, Frost helped streamline the management of ICI by providing a central finance function for a group whose operational structure in the postwar decades still reflected its origins in the merger of four companies in 1926.

As finance director from 1968, he faced the challenge of accounting for high levels of inflation – and took a firm stance against new accounting standards that he did not feel reflected ICI's position fairly. He also established the group's first pension fund and radically improved its financial communications, using films to explain year-end results to staff.

Having retired from ICI in 1976, Frost took on a remarkable portfolio of non-executive appointments. He was one of the first outsiders from industry to be invited on to the Marks & Spencer board, and despite the autocratic style of the chairman, Marcus Sieff, Frost's views carried considerable weight in the company. He also served on the board of the state-owned British Airways – but was generally wary of nationalised industries, and took more persuading to lend his skills to British Leyland (BL), the strike-torn car maker.

He accepted the challenge in 1977, as part of a complete change of top management at BL, only on condition that "my role as chairman of the funding committee must be meaningful, and no Friday meetings". He went on to press the Labour government, rather forcefully, to inject £450 million of new capital into the group. BL's chief executive, Sir Michael Edwardes, wrote later that "the outspoken Frost is one of the most financially orientated businessmen in Britain"; complex arguments with the National Enterprise Board over the shape of BL's balance sheet were "meat and drink to him".

Frost briefed himself meticulously before board meetings, set clear objectives for himself and others, and managed his time so that none of his commitments fell by the wayside. By 1980 the restructuring of BL (boosted by a joint venture with Honda of Japan) was on track, and Frost moved on to apply similar treatment to another state-owned business, British Steel Corporation – in partnership with the Scots-born American industrialist Ian MacGregor, who became British Steel's chairman having previously been deputy chairman of BL.

In the City, meanwhile, Frost was a director of Warburgs, the merchant bank which had been his financial adviser at ICI, until 1983, when he was asked to become chairman of a troubled smaller bank, Guinness Mahon, and to join the board of its parent, Guinness Peat. There he found a battle in progress between two combative personalities – the Bank of England-appointed chief executive Alastair Morton (later chairman of Eurotunnel) and the major shareholder, the commodity trader Lord Kissin. Even Frost's wise counsel could not bring harmony between them.

== Philanthropy ==
Throughout his senior career, Frost always found time for music. A keen violinist who particularly enjoyed string quartets, he had been known to announce that a meeting must end promptly because he had "an appointment with Beethoven" to keep. Having stepped back from business when he reached 70 in 1984, he remained active on behalf of a range of musical and other causes, seeking no recognition for many acts of personal generosity.

In his later years he was a member of the Arts Council and the appeal committee of the Royal Opera House, a deputy chairman of the Association for Business Sponsorship of the Arts, and chairman of the Robert Mayer Trust for Youth and Music and of the City of London Carl Flesch international violin competition – for which he devised a unique voting system for jurors.

He was also a driving force in establishing the Loan Fund for Musical Instruments to encourage young British string players. He assisted with the British contribution to the 1987 exhibition of Stradivari instruments in Cremona to commemorate the great violin maker's 250th anniversary; and in 2005 he helped the Royal Academy of Music to purchase the "Viotti ex-Bruce" Stradivarius.

He was chairman of Remploy, the organisation which provides employment services for the disabled, and deputy chairman of governors of the United Medical Schools of Guy's and St Thomas's hospitals.

== Honours ==
He was appointed CBE in 1983.

== Later years ==
In his nineties, though no longer able to play the violin, Albert Frost remained uncomplaining and keenly interested in current affairs. He married, in 1942, to Eugénie Maude Barlow, who died in 2008. They had no children.
