= 1974 Dissolution Honours =

There were two Dissolution Honours in 1974, due to there being two general elections held in the United Kingdom that year:

- February 1974 Dissolution Honours
- October 1974 Dissolution Honours
