= William Maxwell (co-operator) =

Sir William Maxwell
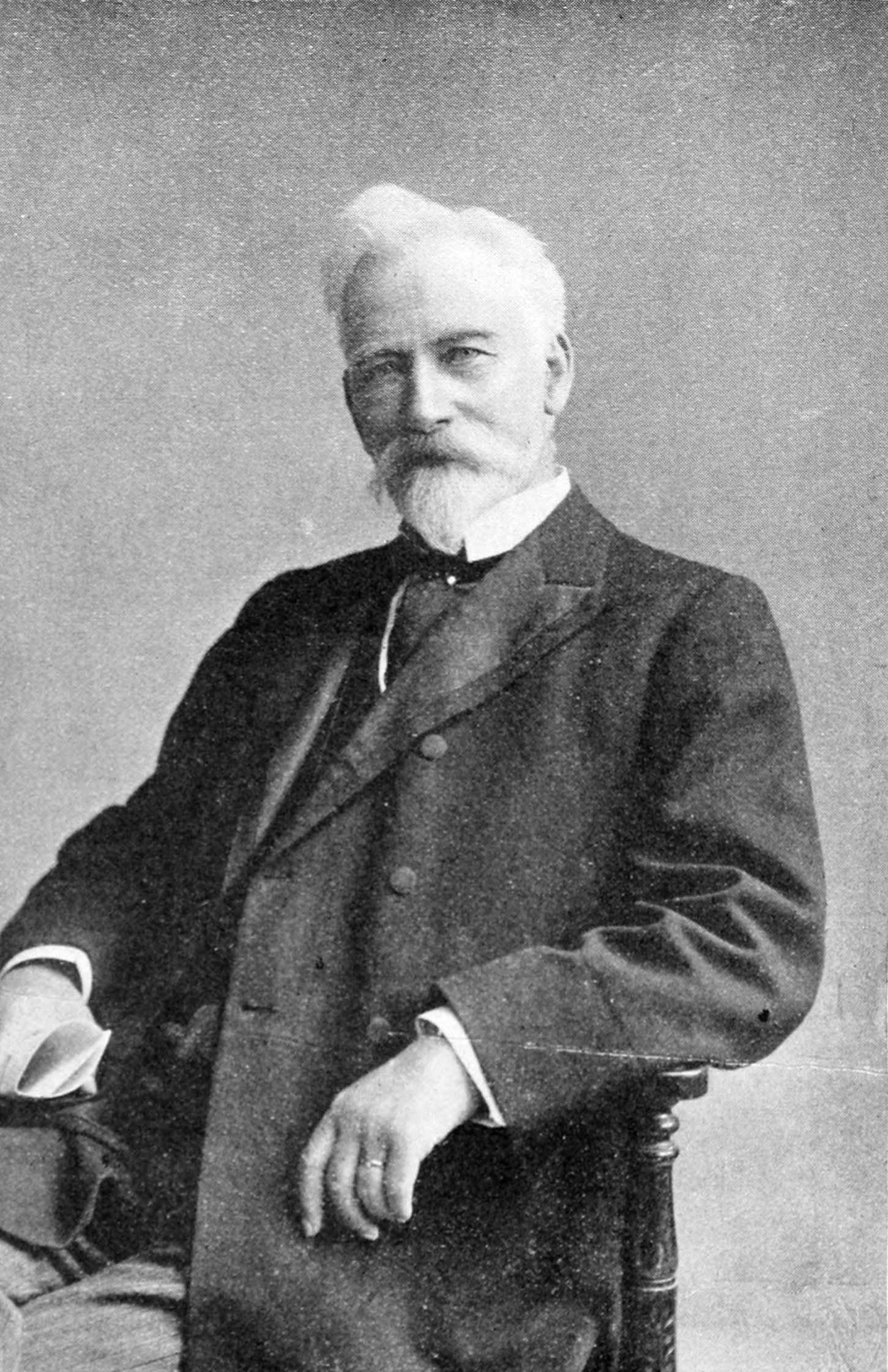
- Born: 30 November 1841; Glasgow, Scotland
- Died: 9 February 1929 (aged 87)
- Movement: Co-operative

Sir William Maxwell (30 November 1841 – 9 February 1929) was a Scottish co-operative activist.

Born in Glasgow, Maxwell largely grew up in Paisley, but returned to Glasgow when he was ten, and became an apprentice coachbuilder two years later. He successfully completed the apprenticeship, having also studied in his spare time at the Glasgow School of Design, and travelled around the country, looking for work.

By the mid-1860s, Maxwell had returned to Glasgow, where he became active in the local trade union movement. He moved to Edinburgh early in the 1870s, and there he became active in the St. Cuthbert's Co-operative Society. In 1878, he was elected as its secretary, serving for four years. This led him to prominence in the Scottish Co-operative Wholesale Society (SCWS), serving on its board from 1880, and as president from 1908 onwards.

Maxwell was interested in co-operative production, and visited the United States in 1884 to study developments there. On his return to Scotland, he led the construction of a series of factories in Shieldhall, making goods for the SCWS. He served repeatedly as president of the Co-operative Congress, and in 1907 became president of the International Co-operative Alliance, serving until 1921.

Maxwell was also interested in the political representation of the co-operative movement, and he stood unsuccessfully as a Liberal-Labour candidate in Glasgow Tradeston at the 1900 UK general election. In 1910, he wrote the History of Co-operation in Scotland. He was knighted in 1919, and retired from all his posts two years later, due to poor health. He relocated to Rothesay, where he lived until his death in 1929.

Non-profit organization positions
Preceded by Earl Grey; Henry William Wolff	President of the International Co-operative Alliance; 1907–1921; With: Earl Grey (1907–1917)	Succeeded by G. J. D. C. Goedhart
