= Albert Ballard =

Albert Ballard CBE (2 August 1888 – 7 January 1969) was a leading figure in the British Co-operative Party.

Ballard became the election agent for A. V. Alexander in the Sheffield Hillsborough constituency in 1922; Alexander gained the seat for the Co-operative Party, taking the Labour Party whip in Parliament. Ballard also became active in the local Labour Party, joining the Fabian Society, and later acting as its local Chairman.

Alexander stood down at the 1950 general election, and Ballard secured the election of his chosen replacement, George Darling. However, he retired as election agent in 1954, becoming Chair of the Co-operative Party from 1955 to 1957.

From 1948 to 1963, Ballard served as Chairman of the Sheffield United Hospital Board, and from 1959 to 1967 he was Chairman of the Sheffield Education Committee. He was also an alderman on Sheffield City Council, and served as Lord Mayor of Sheffield in 1957. He was appointed CBE in the 1955 Birthday Honours.

Party political offices
Preceded by William Coldrick	Chair of the Co-operative Party; 1955–1957	Succeeded by James Peddie
