= Henry William Wolff =

British co-operator (1840–1931)

- Born: 30 December 1840; Leeds, England
- Died: 6 March 1931 (aged 90)
- Movement: Co-operative

Henry William Wolff (30 December 1840 – 7 March 1931) was a British co-operative activist.

Wolff's father ran the Hunslet Flax Mill, and Henry was born in Leeds. He worked in agriculture, spending some in the Vosges and Black Forest. Returning to England, he worked in journalism, and wrote books on a wide variety of subjects. In the 1880s, he was active in the Liberal Party, and became honorary secretary of the London and Counties Liberal Union.

Wolff became active in the co-operative movement, and in 1895 was a founder of the International Co-operative Alliance, serving as its joint president until 1907. He was also a founder of the Agricultural Organisation Society, an advisor to the Irish Agricultural Organisation Society, and to the Imperial government in India on co-operatives.

Non-profit organization positions
| Preceded by New position | President of the International Co-operative Alliance; 1895–1907; With: Earl Grey | Succeeded by Earl Grey and William Maxwell |
