= Peter Lovell-Davis, Baron Lovell-Davis =

The Right Honourable The Lord Lovell-Davis

Member of the House of Lords
- Lord Temporal
- Life peerage 26 June 1974 – 6 January 2001

Personal details
- Born: Peter Lovell Davis; 8 July 1924
- Died: 6 January 2001 (aged 76)
- Party: Labour
- Profession: Publishing executive

Peter Lovell Lovell-Davis, Baron Lovell-Davis (born Peter Lovell Davis; 8 July 1924 – 6 January 2001) was a British publishing executive and politician. He was influential in the success of the 1964, 1966 and 1974 general election campaigns for the Labour Party, and his association with Harold Wilson saw him raised to the peerage to serve in government between 1974 and 1976.

== Early life and publishing career ==
Davis was born on 8 July 1924 to William Lovell Davis and Winifred Mary Davis. He was educated at Christ's College, Finchley and King Edward VI School, Stratford-upon-Avon before joining an RAF officer training course in 1943. He qualified as a Spitfire pilot and saw service during World War II. He left the RAF in 1947 after reaching the rank of flight lieutenant and returned to study English at Jesus College, Oxford.

After writing for the Oxford student magazine Isis during his studies, he joined Central Press Features. With Davis as Managing Director (1952–1970), the agency "flourished" with its political commentary syndicated around the world.

== Politics ==
Soon after the 1959 general election, Davis met Harold Wilson, a member of the Labour Party's National Executive, and tried to persuade him to get the party to use modern techniques in advertising, market research and television campaigning. Though he was unsuccessful at first, the Executive were eventually persuaded. Davis, together with David Kingsley and Dennis Lyons, became unpaid advisers to the party known as the "Three Wise Men" and helped with the success of the 1964 and 1966 campaigns, employing Bob Worcester of MORI to carry out public opinion surveys for them. The campaign ahead of the 1970 election was criticised as distastefully personal and Wilson vetoed it; Labour went on to lose. He maintained close links with Wilson, and the successful campaign for the February 1974 election saw Wilson's return to government. Davis accepted a life peerage and on 26 June 1974 he was created Baron Lovell-Davis, of Highgate in Greater London. He served under Wilson in the Labour government as a Lord-in-waiting from 1974, becoming Under-Secretary of State for Energy in 1975. In 1976, following Wilson's resignation and James Callaghan's succession as Prime Minister, Lovell-Davis was sacked along with a number of other Wilson supporters.

He subsequently served as a member of the Commonwealth Development Corporation board (1978–1984), a member of the London Consortium (1978–1988), and Vice-President of the Youth Hostels Association (1978–2001). He was a trustee of the Whittington Hospital Academic Centre (1980–2001) and of the Museum of the Port of London and Docklands (1985–1998), and he was chairman of Lee Cooper Licensing Services (1983–1990), and Pettifor, Morrow & Associates (1986–1999).

== Personal life ==
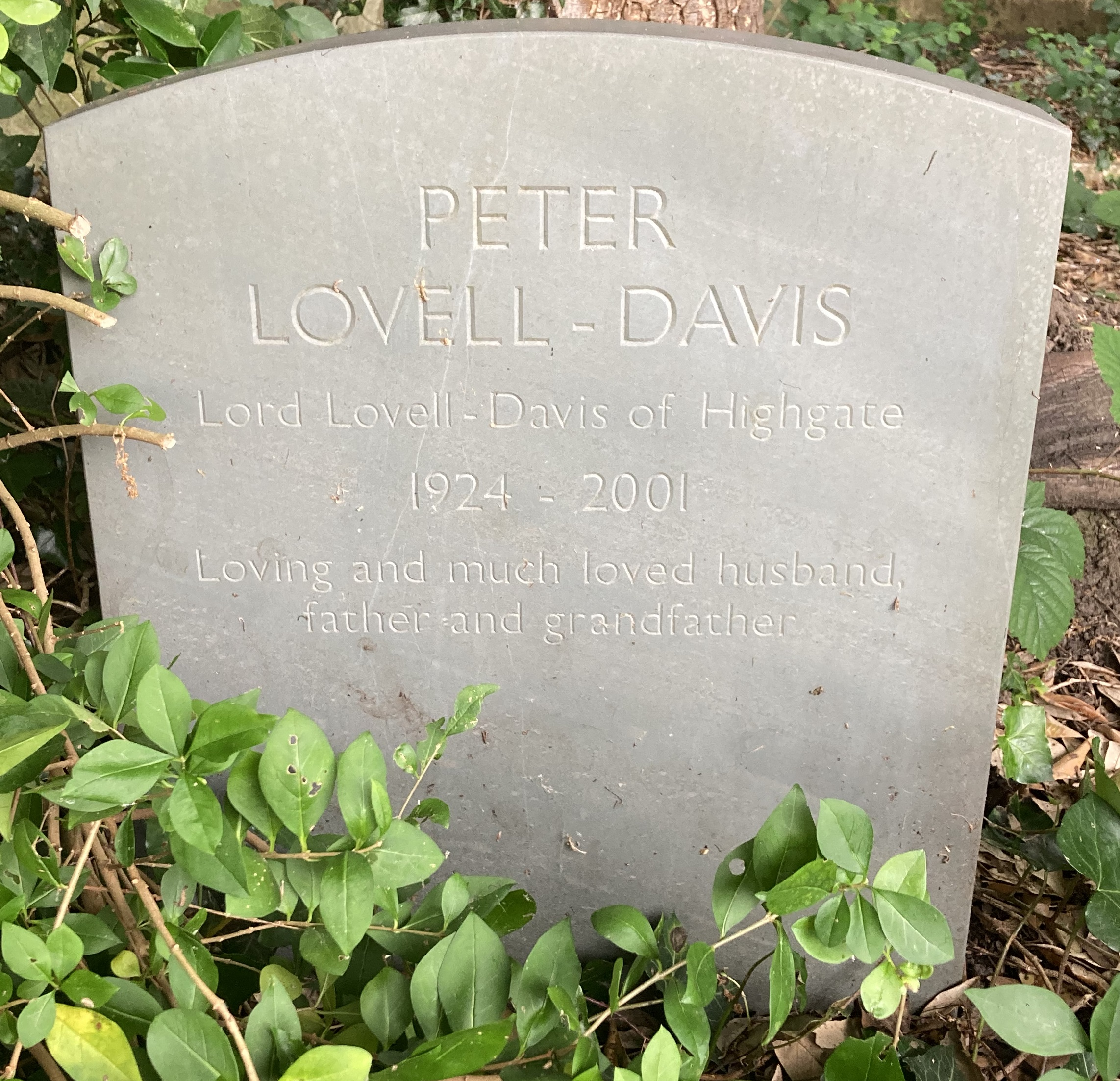
Grave of Peter Lovell-Davis in Highgate Cemetery

In 1950 he married Jean Graham (1929–2020), after they met at Oxford. Lady Lovell-Davis became a children's broadcaster. She was director of the National Association for the Welfare of Children in Hospital, founded in 1961, focused on improving parental care and contact for young patients.

They had two children:

- Stephen (b.1955), a photographer
- Catherine (b.1958)

Peter Lovell-Davis died on 6 January 2001 and his ashes were buried on the western side of Highgate Cemetery.
