= October 1974 Dissolution Honours =

British government recognitions

The October 1974 Dissolution Honours List was issued on 5 December 1974, following the dissolution of the United Kingdom parliament in preparation for a general election.

== Life peers ==
=== Conservative ===
- Rt Hon. Robert Alexander, Lord Balniel, Minister of State, Ministry of Defence 1970–72; Minister of State, Foreign and Commonwealth Office 1972–74; Member of Parliament for the Hertford Division of Hertfordshire 1955–74.
- Rt Hon. Anthony Perrinott Lysberg Barber TD, Chancellor of the Exchequer 1970–74. Member of Parliament for Doncaster 1951–64; Altrincham and Sale 1965–74.
- Rt Hon. Gordon Thomas Calthrop Campbell MC, Secretary of State for Scotland 1970–74. Member of Parliament for Moray and Nairn 1959–74.
- Sir Harmar Nicholls Bt, Parliamentary Secretary, Ministry of Agriculture, Fisheries and Food 1955–57; Ministry of Works, 1957–60. Member of Parliament for the Peterborough Division of Northamptonshire 1950–74.
- Sir Arnold Silverstone, Joint Treasurer, Conservative and Unionist Party.
- Dame Joan Helen Vickers DBE, Member of Parliament for the Devonport Division of Plymouth, 1955–74.
- Dame Irene Mary Bewick Ward CH DBE, Member of Parliament for Wallsend 1931–45; Tynemouth 1950–74.

=== Labour ===
- Richard William Briginshaw, General Secretary, National Society of Operative Printers, Graphical and Media Personnel since 1951. Member, General Council of Trades Union Congress since 1965.
- Donald William Trevor Bruce, Member of Parliament for North Portsmouth 1945–50.
- Sir Hugh Kinsman Cudlipp OBE, chairman, International Publishing Corporation Ltd. 1968–73.
- Sir Sidney Francis Greene CBE, General Secretary, National Union of Railwaymen since 1957.
- Reginald Thomas Paget QC, Member of Parliament for Northampton 1945–74.
- Mary Elizabeth Henderson, lately chairman, Board of Governors, Charing Cross Hospital.
- George Douglas Wallace, Member of Parliament for the Chislehurst Division of Kent 1945–50; Norwich North 1964–74.
- Alfred Wilson, chief executive officer, Co-operative Wholesale Society Ltd. 1969–74.

=== Other ===
- Desmond Anderson Harvie Banks CBE, President, Liberal Party Organisation 1968–69. Member, Liberal Party Executive 1959–74; chairman, 1961–63 and 1969–70.
- Braham Jack Lyons, managing director, Traverse Healy, Lyons and Partners.
