= T. W. Allen (co-operator) =

Welsh co-operator (1864–1943)

Sir T. W. Allen
- Born: Thomas William Allen; 6 February 1864; Abertillery, Monmouthshire, Wales
- Died: 24 November 1943 (aged 79); Newport, Monmouthshire, Wales
- Occupation: Manager
- Movement: Co-operative

Sir Thomas William Allen (6 February 1864 – 24 November 1943) was a British co-operator.

== Biography ==
Allen was born in Abertillery, Monmouthshire, Wales. His father, Thomas Allen, was a Baptist minister. After leaving school he worked for the Tillery Colliery office where he apprenticed in a grocery store. After completing his apprenticeship he began working for the Abertillery Co-operative Society which later merged with the Blaina Co-operative Industrial Society. In 1893 Allen became general manager of the Blaina society.

In 1906 he became a director of the Co-operative Insurance Society and in 1910 became a director of the English Co-operative Wholesale Society, holding both positions until 1933. In 1908 he served as President of Co-operative Congress.

From 1929 to 1933 he was on the executive committee of the International Co-operative Alliance, serving as vice-president. He was chairman of the Consumers' Council during the First World War and was knighted in 1919 for his wartime work. He served as President of the English Co-operative Wholesale Society from 1929 to 1933.

Non-profit organization positions
Preceded by William Lander	President of Co-operative Congress; 1908	Succeeded by W. R. Rae
