= Abraham Greenwood =

British co-operator (1824–1911)

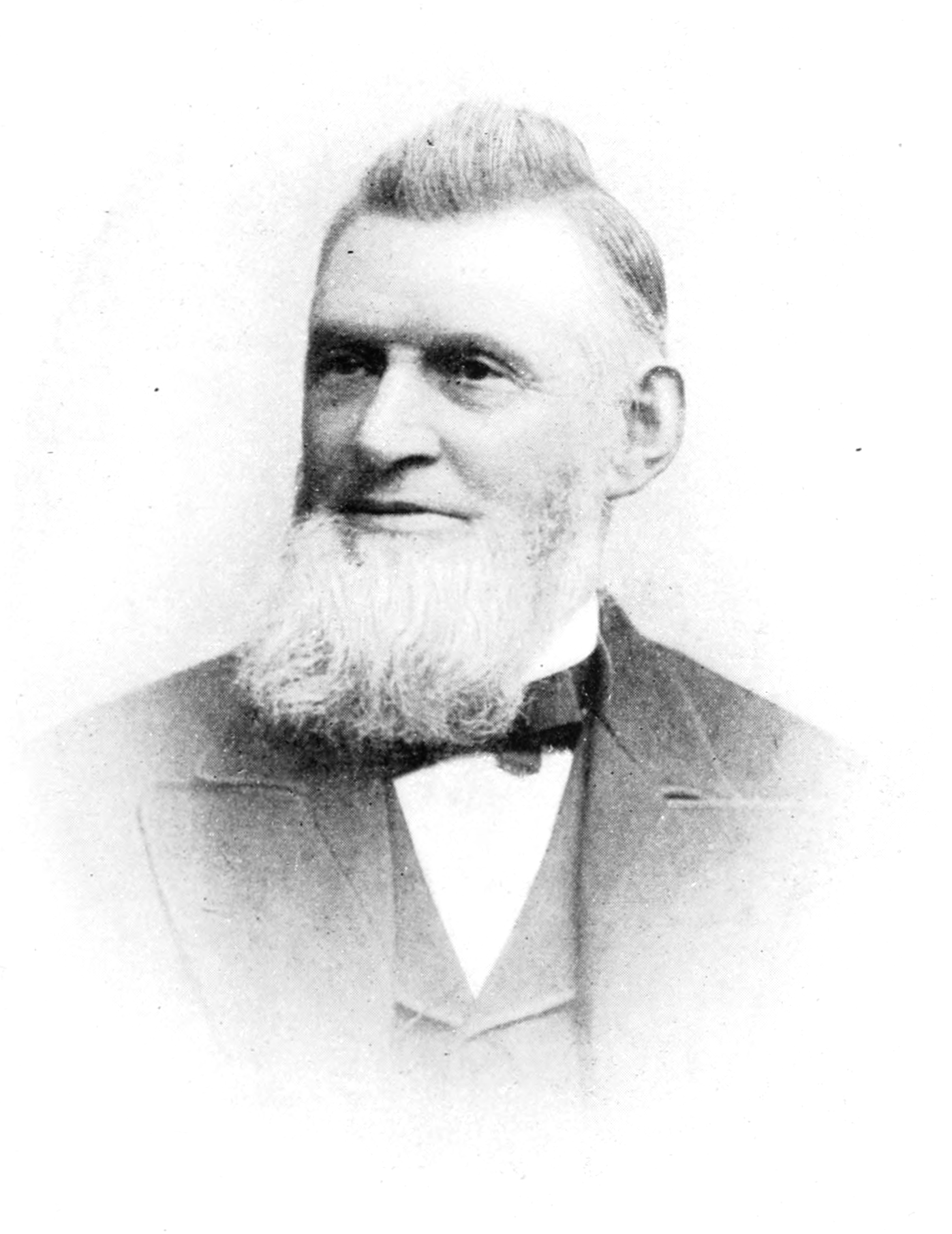
- Born: 1824; Rochdale, Lancashire, England
- Died: 3 May 1911 (aged 86–87); Knott End-on-Sea, Lancashire, England
- Occupations: Wool sorter; Cashier; Bank manager
- Movement: Co-operative; Chartist
- Spouse: Betty Greenwood (died 1886)
- Children: Melinda Greenwood

Abraham Greenwood (1824 – 3 May 1911) was a prolific English co-operator who from 1863 to 1870 served as the first President of the Co-operative Wholesale Society.

== Biography ==
Greenwood was born in 1824 in Rochdale, Lancashire, the son of a blanket manufacturer, David Greenwood and his wife Martha. Greenwood trained as a weaver, and then apprenticed as a wool sorter and remained in the wool sorting trade for 26 years. At 18 Greenwood became secretary of the local Chartist Association and was a librarian for the Rochdale People's Institute.

In 1846 he joined the recently formed Rochdale Society of Equitable Pioneers, serving on the management committee and later becoming president. He was also active in the co-op's educational department and gave classes. He was a founding member and the first chair of the Rochdale Corn Mill Society, later playing a key role in making the mill profitable following mismanagement.

Greenwood strongly advocated for a federal wholesale society to supply retail co-operatives and helped lobby for changes to the Industrial and Provident Societies Partnership Act to permit the establishment of such a society. Upon its founding in 1863 Greenwood was elected president of the North of England Co-operative Wholesale Industrial Provident Society, later shortened to the Co-operative Wholesale Society (CWS). From 1874 to 1878 he was the CWS's cashier, and later served as the society's bank manager.

Alongside his roles in the CWS he was a founder and director of the Co-operative Insurance Company, spent 25 years as chairman of the Co-operative Newspaper Society, and served on the central board of the Co-operative Union. In 1892 he was awarded the honour of serving as President of Co-operative Congress.

In 1886 his wife, Betty, died. His daughter, Melinda, was an active early member of the Co-operative Women's Guild, serving as the Guild's vice-president. Greenwood died on the 3 May 1911 at home in Knott End-on-Sea, Lancashire, and was buried in Rochdale Cemetery.
