= Lloyd Jones (socialist) =

Irish union activist

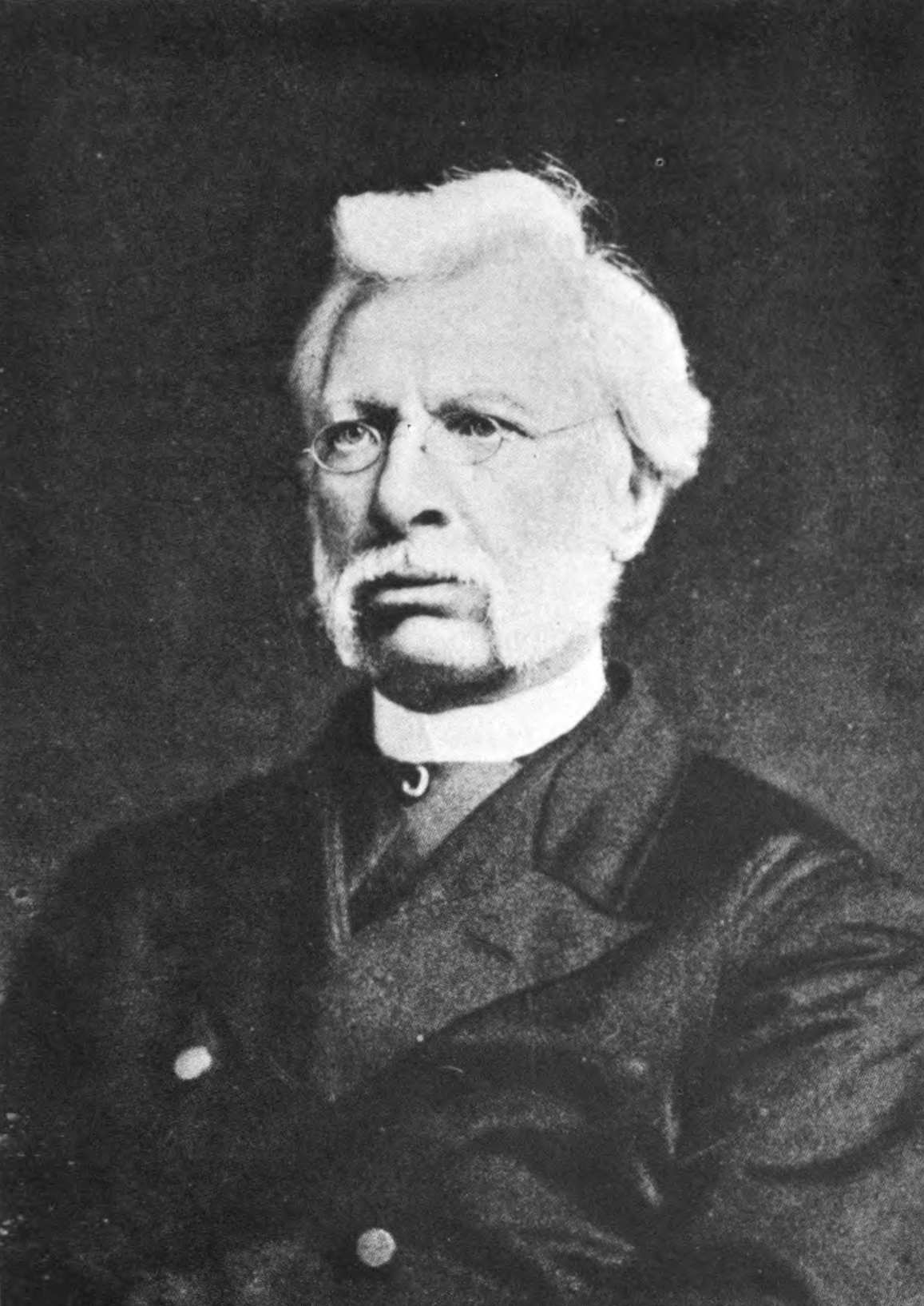
- Lloyd Jones
- Born: Patrick Lloyd Jones; 17 March 1811; Bandon, County Cork, Ireland
- Died: 22 May 1886 (aged 75); Stockwell, London, England
- Occupations: Trade unionist; co-operator; journalist; writer

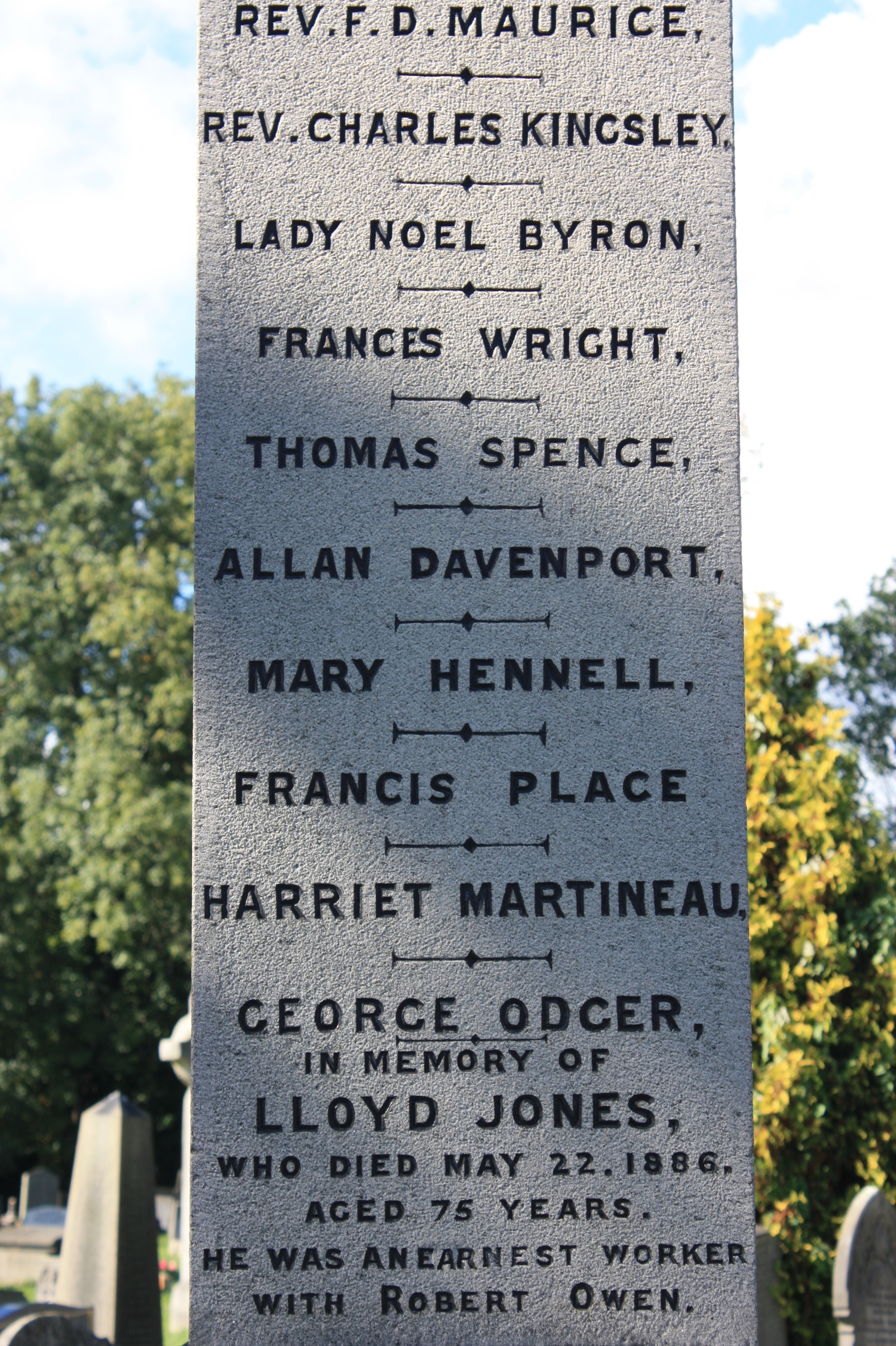
Base of the Reformers Memorial, Kensal Green Cemetery, showing Lloyd Jones

Lloyd Jones (born Patrick Lloyd Jones; 17 March 1811 – 22 May 1886) was an Irish socialist and union activist, advocate of co-operation, journalist and writer.

He was born in Bandon, County Cork in 1811. Described by Sidney and Beatrice Webb as one of "the more thoughtful working-men leaders" and referred to by Karl Marx as "The Tailor", he was a friend, supporter and biographer of Robert Owen (his The Life and Times of Robert Owen was published posthumously in 1889) and aided Samuel Plimsoll in his campaign to improve safety at sea. During the American Civil War, he resigned from the Glasgow Sentinel rather than write a pro-Confederate article.

== Politicisation ==
Lloyd Jones left Ireland for Manchester in 1827 in pursuit of work, where he followed his father's trade taking employment as a fustian cutter and soon after joining the Journeyman's Union of Fustian Cutters was appointed its Secretary.

When there was some expectation of another Peterloo Massacre, Lloyd Jones, like many thousands of others in the North, provided himself with arms, with a view to active resistance.

He joined the Salford Co-operative Society in 1829 and ran its free school until 1831. He subsequently became the chief platform advocate for Robert Owen's plan of village companies and later, when Owen's emphasis shifted to the utopian and religious, Lloyd Jones was a paid Owenite "Social Missionary". He continued evangelising until the mission was ended in 1845. For many years, these plans were vigorously opposed by the clergy who regarded Owen's theories as immoral. Lloyd Jones had a good presence and a fine voice, with readiness and courage in controversy. He was regarded as the best public debater of his day, and was in more discussions than any other of Owen's supporters. When the Chartists' proposal of a month's annual holiday was put forward in 1839 with a view to showing practically the importance of the labouring classes, Lloyd Jones was appointed to address the Chartists of the Manchester district with whom the strength of the movement rested. An audience of five thousand men assembled in the Carpenters' Hall and a further five thousand outside. After Lloyd Jones' speech in opposition to the "sacred month", the project was abandoned.

He was later appointed a member of the first Parliamentary Committee of the Trades Union Congress and was the first secretary of the Labour Representation League.

== Religion ==
Lloyd Jones was born into an Irish family of Welsh immigrant ancestry but, in 1837, dropped his forename, Patrick, as a way of distancing himself from his father who had converted to Catholicism in the Protestant town of Bandon. His views became not only anti-Catholic but also anti-Christian, blaming "a great portion" of the evils in the world on Christianity. Jones, however, stopped short of atheism and held views which nowadays would be considered agnostic.

"Now what is an atheist? Is it not a man who denies the existence of God? Did I do that? Did I not tell you my knowledge was not sufficient to enable me to say that that being did not exist? Did I not tell I could not say he was there, nor positively say that he was not there?"

== Co-operative movement ==
From 1837, until his death, Lloyd Jones was officially connected with the co-operative movement and had a chief part in its organization and development. He largely contributed to political and co-operative journalism editing periodicals in Leeds and London as well as writing many pamphlets. Jones was founder of the Co-operative Industrial and Commercial Union, was on the inaugural board of the Co-operative Union and was involved in the organization of the first annual Co-operative Congress in 1869. He was President of the Co-operative Congress four times including the Oldham Congress, 1885, the seventeenth annual meeting of the co-operative movement and was frequently appointed an arbitrator in trade union disputes.

== Death ==
Jones died of cancer at home in Stockwell, London on 22 May 1886. He is buried in Norwood Cemetery with his wife who outlived him for only nine days.

== Memorials ==
His name is listed at the base of the Reformers Memorial in Kensal Green Cemetery in London and is one of the few with additional comments.

== Selected publications ==
- A reply to Mr. R. Carlile's objections to the five fundamental facts as laid down by Mr. Owen A. Heywood, Manchester, 1837
- The Progress of the Working Class, 1832–1867 (with John Malcolm Forbes Ludlow), A.Strahan, London, 1867
- Life, Times and Labours of Robert Owen 1889

== Selected journalism ==
- Spirit of the Age (1848)
- Spirit of the Times (1849)
- Glasgow Sentinel (1850–1863) (writing as Cromwell)
- North British Daily Mail (1859–1865)
- London Reader (1863)
- Industrial Partnerships Record (1867–1869)
- Bee-hive and Industrial Review (1871–1878)
- Co-operative News (1870s–80s)
- Newcastle Daily and Weekly Chronicles (1876–1886)
- Miner's Watchman and Labour Sentinel (1878)

Party political offices
Preceded by New position	Secretary of the Labour Representation League; 1869–1872	Succeeded by Henry Broadhurst
