= William Henry Brown (journalist) =

- Born: 1867 or 1868; East London, England
- Died: 15 December 1950
- Education: Toynbee Hall; Oxford House
- Occupation: Journalist

William Henry Brown (1867 or 1868 – 15 December 1950) was a British co-operative movement journalist and activist.

Born in East London, Brown studied at Toynbee Hall and the Oxford House University Settlement, becoming a pupil-teacher. In 1888, he began working for the South Hants Evening Star, then, the following year, moved to become assistant editor of the British Trade Journal, then moving on to Architecture.

Brown had known leading members of the co-operative movement from an early age, through his father. He worked with Edward Owen Greening to form the International Co-operative Alliance, and from 1895 to 1916 worked for the Co-operative News, for most of the time as its London correspondent. He then moved to Manchester to work in the publicity department of the Co-operative Wholesale Society, as editor of the Producer, also working on writing histories of several local co-operative societies.

At the 1918 general election, Brown stood for the Co-operative Party in Mossley, but was not elected. He retired in 1934, but continued to assist with producing the Co-operative Review and write on co-operative history.
