= James Peddie, Baron Peddie =

The Right Honourable The Lord Peddie MBE

Member of the House of Lords Lord Temporal
- In office 8 February 1961 – 13 April 1978; Life Peerage

Personal details
- Born: 5 April 1905
- Died: 13 April 1978 (aged 73)
- Party: Labour Co-operative
- Spouse: Hilda Mary Alice Bull

James Mortimer Peddie, Baron Peddie, MBE (5 April 1905 — 13 April 1978) was a British businessman and politician, a leading figure in the UK co-operative movement.

== Early life and education ==
Peddie was son of Crofton Peddie (1863-1938), of Hull, Yorkshire and of Stirling, a labourer at a colour-works, and his wife Ethel, daughter of George Whisker, of Hull, formerly a farmer in North Yorkshire. The Peddie family were from Kelso, on the Scottish Borders (formerly Roxburghshire), and through marriage in the 1800s acquired property on Antigua; Peddie's great-grandfather, Robert Peddie, MD, was a member of the House of Assembly of Antigua.

He was educated at St Paul's Council School, the Hull Municipal Technical College, and at the London School of Economics.

== Career ==
Peddie started his work in the co-operative movement for the Hull Co-operative Society as Publicity Manager and a director. He served in the Ministry of Information during World War II then became a director of the Co-operative Wholesale Society. He served on the boards of the Co-operative Insurance Society and the Co-operative Permanent Building Society (now the Nationwide). He was the President of Co-operative Congress in 1958.

Peddie also served on the national executive of the Co-operative Party and chaired the Party 1957–1965. He became a bridge between the co-operative and trade union movements, and the Labour Party, serving on the National Council of Labour, Co-op and Trade Unions. He served as President of both the Co-operative Congresses of 1958.

Peddie was appointed a Member of the Order of the British Empire (MBE) in the 1944 Birthday Honours, and was created Baron Peddie, of the City and County of Kingston upon Hull on 8 February 1961. He sat on the Labour benches as a Labour Co-operative peer.

He was one of the first members of the National Consumer Council and was appointed chair of the National Board for Prices and Incomes and of the Post Office Users Council. Peddie was also a governor of the British Film Institute and the Advertising Standards Authority.

== Personal life ==
In 1931, Peddie married Hilda Mary Alice, daughter of Henry James Ernest Bull, of Lowestoft, Suffolk and of Hull. They had a son and two daughters.

Party political offices
| Preceded by Albert Ballard | Chair of the Co-operative Party; 1957–1965 | Succeeded by Herbert Kemp |
