= John Malcolm Forbes Ludlow =

English Christian socialist leader

John Malcolm Forbes Ludlow CB
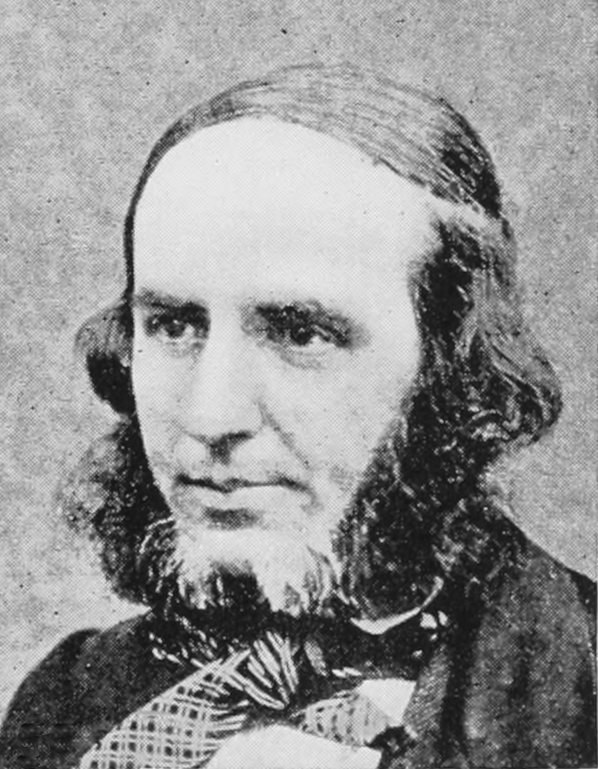
- Born: 8 March 1821; Nimach, British India
- Died: 17 October 1911 (aged 90); London, England
- Occupations: Barrister; journalist
- Movement: Christian socialism

John Malcolm Forbes Ludlow CB (8 March 1821 – 17 October 1911) was an English barrister and journalist. He led the Christian socialist movement and founded its newspaper of the same name.

== Biography ==
He was born in Nimach, British India, where his father worked for the East India Company. He was educated at Merchant Taylors' School, and called to the bar in 1843. Ludlow was influenced by French socialism as he was educated in Paris. These influences include Henri de Saint-Simon's disciple Philippe Buchez's writings and the emergence of cooperative societies in France.

In 1850, he founded and became editor of The Christian Socialist newspaper. He was also a co-founder of the Working Men's College. Most of his work focused on mission work to the poor in London. He promoted mutual cooperation via friendly societies. He was secretary to the royal commission on friendly societies from 1870 to 1874, and served as England's chief registrar of friendly societies from 1875 to 1891. He was one of the first members and subsequently president of the Labour Co-Partnership Association. In 1867 Ludlow co-wrote The Progress of the Working Class, 1832–1867 with Lloyd Jones. He died in London in 1911.

== Deaconesses ==
Ludlow also advocated a higher place for deaconesses in the church, in his publication Woman's Work in the Church: Historical Notes on Deaconesses and Sisterhoods (1865).

He was appointed a CB in the 1887 Golden Jubilee Honours.
