= William Alexander, Baron Alexander of Potterhill =

Scottish educator and administrator (1905–1993)

The Right Honourable The Lord Alexander of Potterhill
- Born: 13 December 1905
- Died: 8 September 1993 (aged 87)
- Occupation: educator and educational administrator

William Picken Alexander, Baron Alexander of Potterhill (13 December 1905 – 8 September 1993) was a British educator and educational administrator who served as general secretary of the Association of Education Committees from 1945 to 1977.

Alexander was born in Paisley, Scotland, and educated at the University of Glasgow. During World War II he served in the Royal Air Force and was promoted on 1 April 1941 to pilot officer. He married Joan Mary Williamson in 1949. Knighted in 1961, he was created a life peer as Baron Alexander of Potterhill, of Paisley in the County of Renfrew, on 2 September 1974.

Lord Alexander died in 1993.

== Works ==
- Intelligence, concrete and abstract;: A study in differential traits (Cambridge University Press, 1935)
- Education in England; the national system, how it works ... (1954)
- Teachers' salaries: Special allowances for teachers; an analysis of the 1956 Burnham report (1958)
- The Burnham primary and secondary schools report, 1959: A commentary (1959)
- Towards a New Education Act (1969)
- Education Acts Amended (1969)
- The Burnham primary and secondary schools report, 1969: A commentary (1969)
- Salaries of teachers of mentally handicapped children (1971)
