= John Jacques, Baron Jacques =

British businessman (1905–1995)

The Right Honourable The Lord Jacques

Member of the House of Lords Lord Temporal
- In office 11 July 1968 – 20 December 1995; Life Peerage

Personal details
- Born: 11 January 1905
- Died: 20 December 1995 (aged 90)
- Party: Labour Co-operative
- Education: Co-operative College

John Henry Jacques, Baron Jacques (11 January 1905 – 20 December 1995) was a British businessman and politician for the Co-operative Party.

== Background ==
Born in Ashington, he was the son of Thomas Dobsons Jacques, a miner and Ann Jaques, (née Bircham) A scholarship led him to the Co-operative College, located in Manchester, where he graduated with a Bachelor of Arts in commerce. He then went to Low Moorsley as a secretary-manager of its Co-operative Society in 1925.

== Career ==
In 1929, Jacques became a tutor at his former school and from 1942 worked as an accountant for Plymouth's Co-op Society until 1945. He was subsequently chief executive of the Portsea Island Co-operative Society until 1965 and during this time served as President of the 1961 Co-operative Congress. From 1964, Jacques chaired the Co-operative Union, retiring after six years. In 1971, he became president of the Retail Trades Education Council, a post he held until 1975.

In recognition of his services to the Co-operative movement, on 11 July 1968 he received a life peerage with the title Baron Jacques, of Portsea Island, in the County of Hampshire, sitting as a Labour Co-operative peer. After some years in the House of Lords, Jacques was appointed a Lord-in-waiting in 1974, however was replaced three years later. In 1977, he became a Deputy Chairman of Committees until 1985. He served as Lord-in-Waiting again in 1979, shortly before Labour's defeat by the Conservative Party.

== Family ==
Jacques and Constance White were married in 1929 and had two sons and a daughter. Constance died in 1987 and two years later Jacques married Violet Davies. He died at Portsmouth in 1995 and was survived by his second wife.

The Portsea Island Society's store in Fratton Road, Portsmouth is now a Wetherspoons pub and was named "The John Jacques" in his honour.
