= Alfred Wilson, Baron Wilson of Radcliffe =

Alfred Wilson, Baron Wilson of Radcliffe (10 June 1909 – 25 January 1983) was a figure within the British co-operative movement and a Labour and Co-operative life peer.

== Biography ==
The son of William Barnes Wilson and Jane Wilson, Alfred Wilson was educated at Technical School, Newcastle upon Tyne. He joined the Co-operative Wholesale Society in Newcastle in 1923, moving to the office of the Secretary in 1929. He became Deputy Secretary and Executive in 1953, Secretary in 1963, and Chief Executive Officer in 1969. He became the first chairman of the Co-operative Bank in 1971 and was appointed president of the Co-operative Congress for 1972.

After his retirement as Chief Executive in 1974, Wilson was nominated for a life peerage in the October 1974 Dissolution Honours. He was created Baron Wilson of Radcliffe, of Radcliffe in Lancashire, on 14 January 1975. He died in 1983.

Wilson married Elsie Hulton in 1932; they had one son and one daughter. Hulton died in 1974. He married secondly Freda Mather in 1976.
