= David Urquhart, Baron Tayside =

Scottish businessman and peer

David Lauchlan Urquhart, Baron Tayside OBE (13 September 1912 – 12 March 1975) was a Scottish business man and life peer.

== Early life ==
David Urquhart attended the Harris Academy in Dundee, Scotland until 1930.

== Career ==
Urquhart became chairman and managing director of the Don Brothers, Buist and Company, an established jute and linen mill which was the largest employer in Forfar. He was also vice president of the Tayside Area Consultative Committee for Economic Planning.

During the government of prime minister Harold Wilson, Urquhart became a member of the Labour Party in 1967 and was created life peer with the title Baron Tayside of Queens Well in the Royal Burgh of Forfar and County of Angus on 15 September 1967. He gave four speeches in the eight years he was a member of the House of Lords, which focused on the economics of Scotland.

He was president of the Chamber of Commerce of Dundee from 1967 and magistrate, and from 1957 to 1961 leader of the parish council in Forfar. Additionally, he was a member of the board of Grampian Television.

== Honors ==
Urquhart was appointed an Officer of the Order of the British Empire (OBE) in the 1966 Birthday Honours.

== Personal life ==
He lived in The Manor in Forfar. He was married in 1939 and his wife had survived him by thirty years.

Coat of arms of David Urquhart, Baron Tayside
Crest A fountain ensigned of an antique crown Or. Escutcheon Per chevron in chief Or and in base Gules a fretty Argent two boars' heads of the second armed of the third and langued Sable in chief and in base a fountain ensigned of an antique crown of the first. Supporters Two boars Gules cringed Or armed Argent and langued Sable each charged with a fountain ensigned of an antique crown Or upon their shoulders. Motto Well We Do
