= Harry Kissin, Baron Kissin =

Harry Aaron Kissin, Baron Kissin (23 August 1912 – 22 November 1997) was a British businessman and life peer.

== Biography ==
Kissin was born in Danzig, the son of a Russian Jewish grain merchant. He was educated in Danzig and at the University of Basel, where he gained a doctorate in law. He qualified as a lawyer in Switzerland in 1933, but moved to London the same year.

A close friend and confidant of Harold Wilson, Kissin was made a life peer on 27 June 1974 as Baron Kissin, of Camden in Greater London. Although he was known to be a Labour supporter, he sat as a crossbencher in the House of Lords.

In 2009, it was revealed that Kissin's name had appeared on a MI5 list of Wilson associates who were considered suspicious because of their links with Eastern Bloc countries. Additionally, MI5 considered Kissin untrustworthy because of his use of prostitutes, and asked the Cabinet Secretary to inform Wilson that Kissin was "obviously not a man to be trusted with confidences".

Kissin was related to the pianist Evgeny Kissin.

== Coat of arms ==
Coat of arms of Harry Kissin, Baron Kissin
Crest A lion sejant erect Or winged Gules on the breast a Hebrew letter ה Gules reposing the sinister paw upon a cornucopia head downwards discharging fruit all Gold. Escutcheon Or between two chevronels three mullets six points Gules a chief chequy Argent and Gules thereon a pale Gules charged with a pair of scales Gold. Supporters Dexter a lion rampant guardant Or maned the tail tufted Gules, sinister a bulldog guardant Proper, both crowned with a mural crown chequy Gules and Argent issuing therefrom a mullet of six points Gules. Motto Tout Passe
