= St. Cuthbert's Co-operative Society =

Former consumer co-operative in Scotland

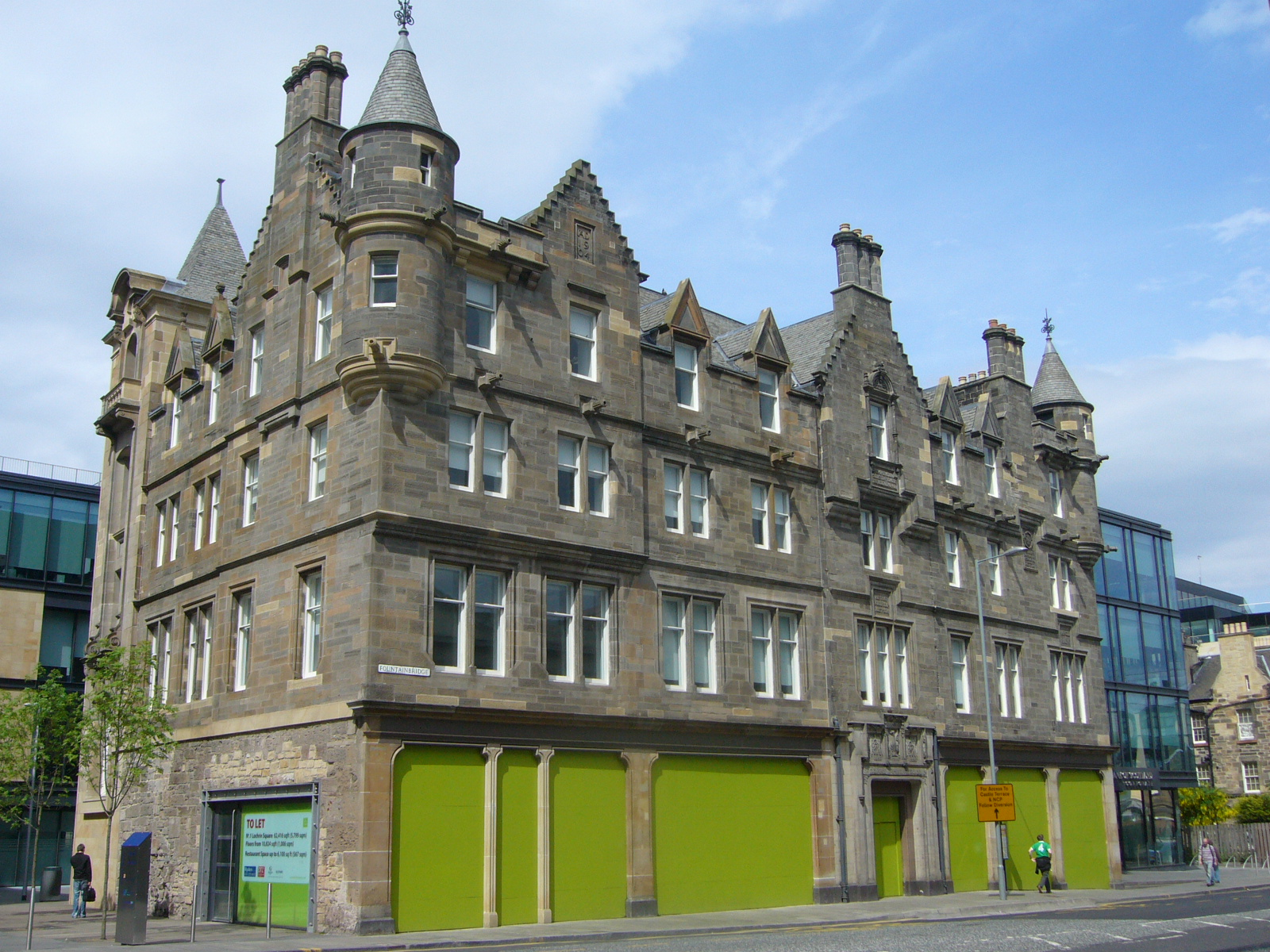
- The Fountainbridge headquarters, built 1880.
- Formerly: St. Cuthbert's Co-operative Association
- Company type: Consumers' co-operative
- Founded: 1859 in Fountainbridge, Edinburgh
- Fate: 1981 merged to form Scotmid
- Successor: Scottish Midland Co-operative Society (Scotmid)

The St. Cuthbert's Co-operative Society was a consumers' co-operative in Scotland. Taking its name from St Cuthbert's Church, Edinburgh, it opened its first shop in Ponton Street, Fountainbridge, Edinburgh in 1859. The society was part of the co-operative movement and followed the Rochdale Principles with the aim of providing decent food at affordable prices in a shop controlled by its customers as a co-operative.

As early as 1913, St. Cuthbert's had bought the Cliftonhall Estate which was almost 970 acres in area. In 1918, four more farms were bought on the Newtonhall Estate and in 1919, 780 acres were purchased at Bonnington, all near Ratho at that time in Midlothian. By 1949 the Association owned over three thousand acres of land.

St Cuthbert's expanded to become one of the largest societies in the British co-operative movement, employing some 3,000 at its peak. It had a bakery and a dairy in Fountainbridge. The dairy used horse-drawn delivery floats until 1985, and between 1944 and 1950 employed the future actor Sean Connery as a milkman, earning him his nickname "the Edinburgh Milkman".

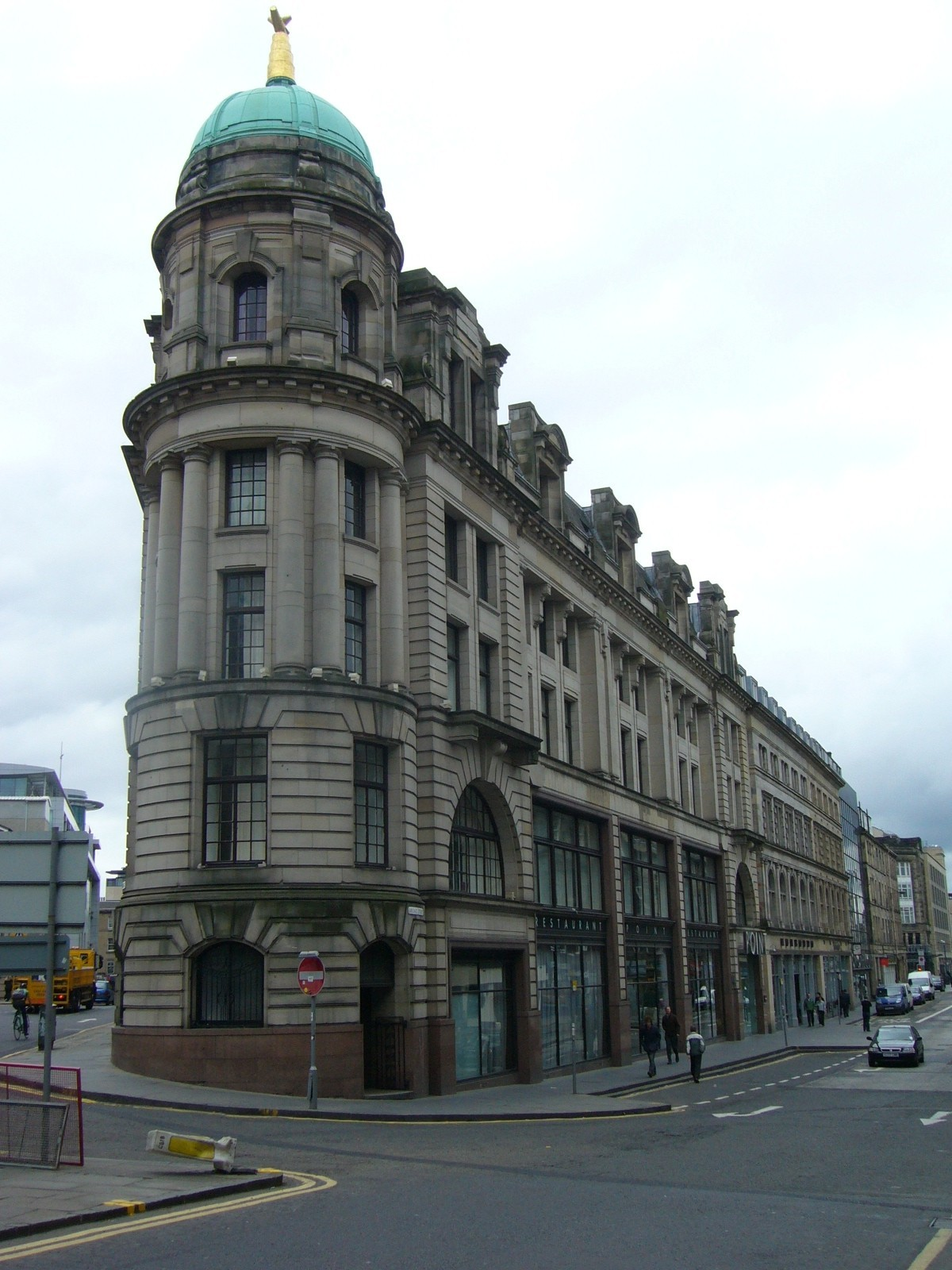
The former department store in Bread Street

St Cuthbert's had many shops throughout Edinburgh, including a department store in Bread Street which was built in three stages to designs by three architects: John McLachlan in 1892; Thomas P. Marwick in 1898 and 1914 and Thomas Waller Marwick in 1936. The 1930s section features a glass 'curtain wall', the first of its kind in Scotland, in contrast to the stone facades of its late 19th-/early 20th-century neighbours. The store closed in the early 1990s and buildings were converted for use as the Point Hotel and Conference Centre in 1999.

In 1981 St Cuthbert's amalgamated with the Dalziel Society of Motherwell being renamed the Scottish Midland Co-operative Society, for short Scotmid.
