= Dennis Lyons, Baron Lyons of Brighton =

Braham Jack Dennis Lyons, Baron Lyons of Brighton (11 September 1918 – 18 January 1978) was a British public relations consultant and life peer.

Lyons was educated at St Paul's School and worked as a journalist and a public relations consultant. He was one of Harold Wilson's main speechwriters, and coined phases associated with Wilson such as "yesterday's men" and "social contract".

On 22 January 1975, Lyons was created a life peer, as Baron Lyons of Brighton, of Brighton in the County of East Sussex. The peerage had been created at Wilson's recommendation.
