= Edward Rye =

English landowner

Edward Rye was an English landowner with property in Doncaster.

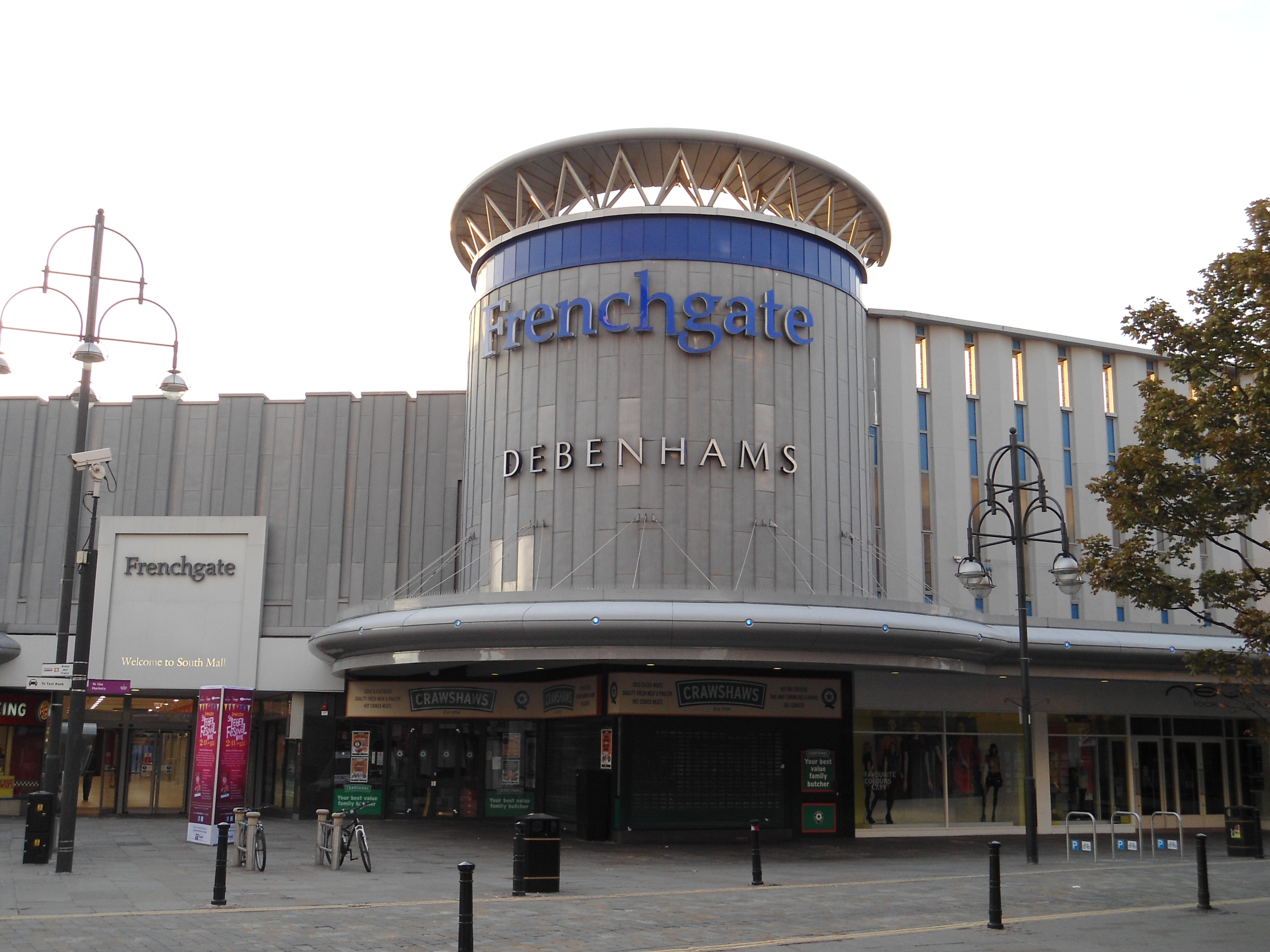
Edward Rye had a house in the Frenchgate area of Doncaster, where he offered hospitality to Anne of Denmark and her retinue in 1603

He was the eldest son of Brian Rye of Whitwell and his wife, Jane Eyre. The family lands at Whitwell, Derbyshire were sold to Richard Whalley (1499–1583), who had been a noted supporter of Edward Seymour, 1st Duke of Somerset during the reign of Edward VI, and in 1552 Edward Rye was a ward of Whalley. Whitwell Old Hall was bought by Sir John Manners of Haddon Hall in 1595, and he rebuilt the house.

Edward Rye lived at Aston, near Sheffield. The house, Aston Hall, which belonged to the Darcy family, has been rebuilt since his time. He also had a house in the Frenchgate of Doncaster, where his coat of arms was depicted on a plaster ceiling, and a property known as the White Hart. His wife Maud Wentworth died in 1606.

In June 1603 he entertained Anne of Denmark, the wife of James VI and I, who had come from the King's Manor at York, via Grimston Park, on her way to Worksop Manor. She was travelling to Windsor Castle from Scotland after the Union of the Crowns, with her children Prince Henry and Princess Elizabeth. King James had already passed through Doncaster on 19 April, staying a night at an inn called the Sign of the Sun and Bear, after a visit to Pontefract Castle. The Sun and Bear was probably in Baxter Gate, and was later renamed as "The Angel".

A year later, Anne of Denmark recalled the hospitality of Edward Rye in a letter to Sir Robert Cecil, asking him to assist Rye in his legal dispute with Conyers Darcy, 7th Baron Darcy de Knayth, the "Lord Darcie of the North" and owner of the Aston property.

Some older genealogical sources suggest that Edward Rye died in 1602. His daughter Frances married John Everard in Doncaster in 1607.
