= Wool Market =

Wool Market is the name of:

- Doncaster Wool Market, a market hall in England
- Wool Market, Mississippi, a community in the United States
- Wool Market square in Bydgoszcz, a square in Poland
