= Listed buildings in Doncaster (Town Ward) =

Town ward is a ward in the metropolitan borough of Doncaster, South Yorkshire, England. The ward contains 105 listed buildings that are recorded in the National Heritage List for England. Of these, two are listed at Grade I, the highest of the three grades, two are at Grade II*, the middle grade, and the others are at Grade II, the lowest grade. The ward contains the central part of the town of Doncaster. Most of the listed buildings in the ward are houses and associated structures, shops, offices, hotels and public houses, commercial buildings, market buildings, and public buildings. The town has an important railway history, and buildings associated with this, including some in Doncaster Works and Doncaster railway station are listed. The other listed buildings include a lock on the River Don Navigation, churches and associated structures, a former theatre, a war memorial, and a former swimming pool and health club.

== Key ==
Grade	Criteria
I	Buildings of exceptional interest, sometimes considered to be internationally important
II*	Particularly important buildings of more than special interest
II	Buildings of national importance and special interest

== Buildings ==
Name and location	Photograph	Date	Notes	Grade
4, 5 and 6 High Street; 53.52362°N 1.13476°W		17th century	Two shops with a timber framed core, encased in brick, rendered and painted, and with a slate roof. There are two storeys and an attic, the ground floor was originally jettied, and is now infilled with 20th-century shop fronts. In the upper floor are two two-light windows, and there are two gabled dormers, one with a three-light casement window.	II
Nether Hall; 53.52533°N 1.12887°W		c. 1702	A house, later extended and used as offices, it is in stuccoed brick, on a plinth, with stone dressings, rusticated quoins, a moulded cornice, and a hipped Westmorland slate roof. There are two storeys and attics, an original L-plan, a front of five bays, and nine bays on the return. On the front is a portico with four Doric columns, a frieze with triglyphs, a modillion cornice, and a doorway with a moulded surround and a fanlight. The windows are sashes, and there are three roof dormers. On the right return is a two-storey canted bay window.	II
50 and 51 Market Place; 53.52434°N 1.13353°W		Early 18th century	Two houses, later a shop, it is stuccoed on the front with stone dressings, the rear is in red brick, and it has a pantile and tile roof. There are three storeys and three bays. In the ground floor is a 20th-century shop front, above which is a two-storey semicircular-arched recess in the middle bay. This contains a tripartite sash window with a pediment, and a smaller sash window above. In the outer bays are sash windows with semicircular heads, and at the top is a moulded eaves band, a frieze and a moulded cornice. At the rear are mullioned windows and dentilled eaves.	II
The Mansion House and railings 53.52310°N 1.13410°W		1744–49	The house was designed by James Paine as the residence for the mayor, and the parapet was replaced in 1801. The building is in stone with a hipped slate roof, and has a front of three storeys and a basement, and three bays. The basement and ground floor are rusticated. Steps lead up to the central recessed entrance that has a segmental arch with rusticated voussoirs and a keystone. Flanking the entrance are two pairs of blocked Ionic columns, and the outer bays contain sash windows. The middle floor has pairs of Corinthian columns, a central Venetian window, and windows with triangular pediments on scrolled consoles in the outer bays, with balconies in front of all the windows, and festoons above. Over this floor is a modillion cornice, and the top floor has paired pilasters and sash windows. On top of the building is a parapet with urns, cornucopia, and a central panel with an achievement, surmounted by a lion. Enclosing the basement areas are railings on dwarf walls.	I
44 High Street; 53.52304°N 1.13385°W		Mid 18th century	A house, later a shop, in red brick, with dressings in stone and brick, a moulded dentilled cornice, and a slate roof with coped gables and moulded kneelers. There are three storeys and four bays. In the ground floor is a 19th-century shop front, with three fluted Ionic half-columns and an entablature. Over the columns are impost blocks on which are urn finials, and on a larger block is a gilded eagle. The upper floors contain sash windows, those in the middle floor with wedge lintels.	II
50 and 51 High Street; 53.52344°N 1.13484°W		Mid 18th century	A house, later used for other purposes, in painted brick, on a plinth, with stone and brick dressings, a moulded cornice, and a slate roof. There are three storeys and five bays. The left bay in the ground floor contains a doorway with a fanlight and an entablature. To the right are two wide bow windows, and a central entrance that has a fanlight and a moulded hood on fluted consoles. The bow windows are flanked by pilasters, and above are moulded cornices and reeded friezes. In the middle floor are two shallower bow windows, and to the left is a sash window with an architrave and an iron balcony. The top floor contains five smaller windows.	II
54 and 55 Market Place; 53.52445°N 1.13378°W		Mid 18th century	Two houses later used for other purposes, the building is in brown brick with stone dressings, a sill band, an ogee-bracketed, moulded cornice, and a slate roof, with a pediment over the central bay. There are three storeys and five bays, the middle bay projecting in the upper two floors. In the ground floor are three round arches with 20th-century shop fronts. The upper floors contain sash windows with moulded architraves. The window in the centre of the middle floor is in a recessed round arch and has a pulvinated frieze, and a cornice on consoles.	II
Georgian House; 53.52212°N 1.12910°W		Mid 18th century	A house, later a shop, it is stuccoed, on a plinth, with stone dressings, a rusticated ground floor, a sill band, a dentilled cornice and blocking course, and a tarred slate roof with coped gables and moulded kneelers. There are three storeys and five bays. Four steps with railings lead up to the central Doric porch that has an entablature, a frieze, and a moulded cornice, and a doorway with a fanlight. This is flanked by recessed bow windows, and in the upper floors are sash windows. Along the middle floor is a bracketed decorative balcony with palmettes and a Greek key frieze.	II
Lock at Strawberry Lock; 53.53344°N 1.12750°W	—	Mid 18th century	The lock on the River Don Navigation is in stone, and consists of a rectangular chamber about 12 feet (3.7 m) wide and 20 feet (6.1 m) long. There are indents for gates at each end, and the remains of chamfered copings. At the north end is a later stone bridge.	II
The Woolpack Hotel; 53.52413°N 1.13188°W		Mid 18th century	The public house is stuccoed, on a plinth, with stone dressings, a sill band, a dentilled cornice and a stone slate roof with coped gables and moulded kneelers. There are three storeys and five bays. In the centre is a segmental-arched entrance with a moulded surround, pilasters, and a bracketed hood, and this is flanked by bow windows with pilasters and moulded cornices. The upper floors contain sash windows, those in the middle floor with architraves.	II
24 and 25 Baxter Gate; 53.52434°N 1.13456°W		1754	A pair of houses, later shops, in red brick, with dressings in stone and brick, sill bands, a dentilled stone cornice, and a slate roof with moulded gable copings and moulded kneelers. There are three storeys, and each shop has three bays. In the ground floor are 20th-century shop fronts, the upper floor windows of No. 24 are casements, and No. 25 has sash windows.	II
8 Hall Gate; 53.52268°N 1.13124°W	—	Late 18th century	A house, later used for other purposes, it is in painted brick, with dressings in brick and stone, a stepped and cogged eaves band, and a slate roof. There are three storeys and three bays, the left bay narrower. In the ground floor is a 20th-century shop front, and the upper floors contain sash windows.	II
9 Hall Gate; 53.52267°N 1.13115°W	—	Late 18th century	A house, later an office, it is stuccoed, with stone dressings, and a pantile roof with a coped gable and shaped kneeler on the right. There are three storeys and two bays. In the ground floor is a 20th-century shop front and a recessed opening to the right, and the upper floors contain casement windows.	II
40, 41 and 41A Hall Gate; 53.52217°N 1.12935°W		Late 18th century	A house, later shops and offices, it is stuccoed with stone dressings, a band, a moulded cornice, and a slate roof. There are three storeys and seven bays, with a pediment containing a carved laurel wreath over the middle three bays. In the centre is a recessed lobby with a moulded elliptical arch at the rear, and this is flanked by 19th and 20th-century shop fronts. In the upper floors are sash windows, those in the middle floor with keystones. The central window has a moulded architrave and a crested cornice on moulded consoles, and the window above has a moulded architrave. In front of the central five windows in the middle floor are iron balconies.	II
24 and 24B High Street; 53.52301°N 1.13303°W		Late 18th century	A house, later a shop, it is stuccoed, and has stone dressings, a moulded stone cornice, and a tile roof. There are three storeys and four bays. In the ground floor is a 20th-century shop front, the middle floor contains tall windows, and in the top floor the windows are sashes.	II
41 High Street; 53.52290°N 1.13347°W		Late 18th century	A house, later a shop, in painted brick with stone dressings, a moulded stone cornice, and a tile roof. There are three storeys and three bays. In the ground floor is a 20th-century shop front. The central window in the middle floor is a bow oriel window with a moulded cornice and a lead roof, and the other windows are sashes with cambered heads.	II
1 South Parade and railings 53.52074°N 1.12486°W	—	Late 18th century	A house, later offices, it is stuccoed, on a plinth, with stone dressings, a sill band, and a hipped slate roof. There are three storeys and three bays, and a recessed two-storey one-bay extension on the left. Steps lead up to a central recessed doorway with Tuscan columns and pilasters carrying an entablature, the central arch has a moulded architrave, and it contains a fanlight. In the ground floor are Venetian windows in semicircular-arched recesses. The upper floors contain sash windows, the window above the doorway is in a round-arched recess, and there are narrow inserted windows in the top floor. Enclosing the area to the front of the house are railings.	II
2 South Parade and railings 53.52080°N 1.12505°W	—	Late 18th century	A house, later offices, it is stuccoed, with stone dressings, a sill band, an entablature with a cornice, an eaves band, and a hipped slate roof. There are three storeys and a basement, a later attic storey, and three bays. In the basement are sash windows. Steps lead up to a central recessed doorway with Tuscan columns and pilasters carrying an entablature, the central arch has a moulded architrave, and it contains a fanlight. In the ground floor are Venetian windows in semicircular-arched recesses. The upper floor contains sash windows, and in the attic storey are three segmental-headed sash windows in segmental-headed recesses, with double keystones and flanking rustication. The basement area is enclosed by railings.	II
7 and 8 South Parade; 53.52106°N 1.12589°W	—	Late 18th century	A pair of houses, later used for other purposes, in red brick, No. 8 stuccoed, on a plinth, with dressings in stone and brick, No. 7 with dentilled eaves, No. 8 with a plain eaves band, and with a slate roof. There are three storeys and attics, and three bays, the middle bay containing an almost full height recessed round arch containing a smaller arch. In the ground floor are paired doorways that have rectangular fanlights, entablatures, impost blocks, and moulded cornices on consoles. The outer bays contain two-storey bow windows, No. 7 with a middle floor balcony. In the top floor are tripartite sash windows, and No. 7 has a gabled attic dormer.	II
15 South Parade; 53.52144°N 1.12701°W		Late 18th century	A large house, later used for other purposes, it is stuccoed, on a plinth, with stone dressings, a sill band, a moulded entablature, and hipped slate roofs. The main block has three storeys and five bays, the middle three bays slightly projecting under a pediment, to the left is a two-storey two-bay wing, and flanking these at each end are single-storey single-bay extensions. Between the bays in the main block are giant pilasters with carved friezes and egg-and-dart cornices. In the centre is a Roman Doric porch with a moulded architrave, the doorway has a fanlight, above it is a full-width iron balcony, and all the windows are sashes. In the extension are segmental-headed recesses.	II
16, 16A and 17 South Parade; 53.52159°N 1.12743°W		Late 18th century	A row of three houses, later used for other purposes, they are stuccoed, on a plinth, with stone dressings, floor bands, and hipped slate roofs. There are three storeys and basements, and four unequal bays. The left bay projects slightly, it contains a two-storey bow window with a balcony in the upper floor, over which is a moulded stone cornice. In the middle two bays are doorways with semicircular fanlights and cornices. The wider right bay contains a two-storey bow window, flanked by recesses with a flat head in the ground floor and a round arch in the middle floor. The other windows are sashes.	II
18 South Parade and railings 53.52164°N 1.12760°W		Late 18th century	A house, later offices, in painted and stuccoed stone, the ground floor rusticated, with a sill band, paired pilasters in the upper floors, an entablature, a moulded cornice and a slate roof. There are three storeys, a basement and attics, and three bays. In the outer bays are semicircular doorways with panelled jambs, moulded imposts, reeded lintels, fanlights, swagged friezes, and pediments on fluted consoles. Between them is a tripartite sash window with a cornice and a panelled apron in a segmental-arched recess with voussoirs. The upper floors contain sash windows, in the middle floor with balconies, the central window with pilasters and an entablature in a segmental-headed recess. Over the central window is a patera, and over the outer windows are blind panels. In the attic is a segmental-headed dormer, and enclosing the area to the front of the house are railings.	II
Municipal Offices; 53.52318°N 1.13426°W		Late 18th century	Three houses on a corner site, later offices, the building is stuccoed, with stone dressings, a moulded eaves cornice, and slate roofs with coped gables and moulded kneelers. There are three storeys and a double range plan, with four bays on High Street, and five bays and two gables on Priory Place. The doorway is angled on the corner and has fluted Ionic columns, an entablature, and a moulded pediment. On the far left is a round-headed doorway converted into a window, with a moulded architrave, panelled jambs, and a cornice on reeded consoles. Between them and on the right return are sash windows divided by pilasters and rusticated stonework. The upper floors on both fronts contain sash windows.	II
The Magdalen Hotel; 53.52505°N 1.13177°W		Late 18th century	A public house in painted brick, the ground floor stuccoed, with stone dressings, over the ground floor is a timber cornice and a sill band, and at the top is an eaves band and a slate roof. There are three storeys and five bays. In the centre is a doorway with pilasters and a fanlight, the outer bays contain smaller doorways, and the windows are sashes.	II
The Queen Hotel and 1–5 Sunny Bar; 53.52476°N 1.13173°W		Late 18th century	A house, later a public house, and a terrace of shops added in the early 19th century, on a corner site, in brick, on a plinth, with dressings in stone and brick, and slate roofs, and there are three storeys. The public house has three bays, the ground floor contains a doorway with pilasters and a fanlight flanked by casement windows, and in the upper floors are sash windows. The terrace has one bay on Market Place, and a curved corner. There is an angled doorway on the corner, and two round-headed doorways on Sunny Bar, both with pilasters and semicircular fanlights. The left door has a triangular pediment on decorated consoles, and the right door has a frieze, and a cornice on scrolled consoles. Elsewhere in the ground floor are shop windows, and the upper floors contain sash windows.	II
Westminster Building; 53.52283°N 1.13330°W		1780	A house, later used for other purposes, it was rebuilt in about 1920, apart from the front to which mosaic was added. The building is in stone with a dentilled cornice and a slate roof. There are three storeys, the middle three bays projecting slightly under a pediment, and five bays, flanked by two-storey single-bay wings. The ground floor contains 20th-century shop fronts, and in the upper floors, the bays are divided by giant ionic pilasters. The windows have architraves, in the main block they have flat heads, in the wings they have semicircular heads and above them are balustraded parapets.	II
Clergy House; 53.52605°N 1.13524°W	—	1786	The vicarage is in rendered stone, with stone dressings, and a slate roof with coped gables and kneelers. There are two storeys and attics, and fronts of four and two bays. The doorway has pilasters, a fanlight, and a moulded pediment. On the south front, in the left bay, is a bow window flanked by blind semicircular-headed recesses, over which is a band with an inscription. In the upper floor is a Venetian window, over which is a pediment containing an oculus. The north front contains two-storey canted bay windows, and the other windows in the house are sashes.	II
19 Hall Gate; 53.52255°N 1.13035°W	—	c. 1790	A house, later used for other purposes, it is in stuccoed brick with bracketed eaves and a slate roof. There are three storeys and two bays. In the ground floor is an early 20th-century shop front with a recessed entrance, curved plate glass windows, and a moulded surround, and the upper floors contain sash windows.	II
Hall Cross; 53.52074°N 1.12453°W		1793	The monument was erected on the site of an ancient cross, it is in stone, about 40 feet (12 m) high, and stands on a circular plinth on two circular steps. The base is octagonal with a moulded plinth and a coved cornice. Three circular steps lead up to a tall column with four attached colonnettes, each with a moulded base and a coved cornice. On the top is an octagonal pinnacle, an acanthus urn finial, and a weathervane. On the north side of the base is a medieval inscription.	II
43 Prince's Street; 53.52240°N 1.12895°W	—	c. 1795	A house, later used for other purposes, it is stuccoed, on a plinth, with stone dressings, a sill band, and a slate roof. There are three storeys and three bays. In the ground floor is a 20th-century shop front and, to the right, steps with railings lead up to a doorway with fluted pilasters, a fanlight, a frieze, and a moulded pediment. The upper floors contain sash windows, those in the middle floor with moulded cornices, the one on the right also with fluted consoles.	II
19, 20, 21 and 21A South Parade; 53.52170°N 1.12776°W		1797	A terrace of four stuccoed houses, later offices, with stone dressings, a moulded cornice and blocking course, and a slate roof. There are three storeys and a semi-basement, and a symmetrical front of five bays. The basement and ground floor are recessed, and in front of the ground floor is a loggia of six Doric columns and iron railings. This floor contains sash windows, the middle one tripartite with a segmental head, and round-arched doorways with moulded architraves, decorated spandrels, and moulded cornices on fluted consoles. The top floors contain sash windows, and in the middle floor are three bow windows. On the top are four swagged urns, and two gabled dormers.	II
50 Hall Gate; 53.52234°N 1.13072°W		Late 18th to early 19th century	A house, later used for other purposes, it is stuccoed, on a plinth, with quoins, a moulded cornice over the ground floor, a floor band, a moulded eaves cornice, and a slate roof. There are three storeys and five bays. In the centre, steps lead up to a round-arched doorway with pilasters, a fanlight, an entablature a moulded cornice and a blocking course. In the right bay is a smaller round-headed doorway. The windows are sashes, those in the ground floor with panelled aprons, pilasters, friezes and cornices. The window above the doorway has an architrave, a panelled apron, and a moulded cornice on consoles.	II
23 High Street; 53.52304°N 1.13313°W		Late 18th to early 19th century	A house, later a shop, in painted brick, with dressings in brick and stone, a sill band, a moulded stone cornice, and a tile roof. There are three storeys and two bays. In the ground floor is a 20th-century shop front, and the upper floors contain tall windows.	II
25 High Street; 53.52298°N 1.13290°W		Late 18th to early 19th century	A house, later used for other purposes, it is in red brick with dressings in brick and stone, a moulded stone cornice, and a tarred slate roof. There are three storeys and three bays. In the ground floor is a 20th-century shop front with a doorway on the right, and the upper floors contain sash windows.	II
3 South Parade; 53.52089°N 1.12523°W	—	Late 18th to early 19th century	A house, later offices, mainly stuccoed, on a plinth, with stone dressings, rusticated quoins, and a hipped slate roof. There are two storeys, the central block has three bays, and there are flanking lower single-bay wings. Steps lead up to a Tuscan porch with a frieze and a moulded pediment, and a doorway with a semicircular fanlight and moulded imposts. This flanked by bow windows with moulded cornices. In the upper floor are sash windows, the middle window in a segmental-arched recess with voussoirs, and at the top is a moulded cornice and parapets with three panels of blind balustrading. In the outer bays are sash windows, the right bay also contains a small doorway, and between the floors are panels of blind balustrading.	II
The Salutation Hotel; 53.52127°N 1.12649°W		Late 18th to early 19th century	The public house is stuccoed, on a plinth, and has stone dressings, a bracketed gutter, a moulded cornice, and a slate roof. There are three storeys and five bays. In the left bay is a large segmental archway, the middle bay contains a doorway that has engaged columns with foliage capitals, a fanlight, a plain frieze, and a moulded cornice, and in the other bays are tripartite sash windows. The middle floor of the right bay contains a bow window with an ironwork balcony, and above is a tripartite window. The other bays contain sash windows, the outer ones in the middle floor with balconies.	II
The Grand St Leger Hotel, walls and pavilion 53.51872°N 1.10998°W		1801	A house, later a hotel, it is stuccoed, on a plinth, with stone dressings, sill bands, a moulded stone cornice, and a slate roof. There are three storeys, a front of five bays with three bays along the sides, flanking two-storey screen walls with parapets, and on the right is a two-storey two-bay pedimented pavilion. In the centre is a Tuscan porch and a semicircular-headed doorway with a fanlight. The windows are sashes, those in the first floor in all parts with ironwork balconies. The left screen wall has a round-arched recess, the right screen wall contains a doorway, and in the ground floor of the pavilion is a round-headed window.	II
Elmfield House; 53.51985°N 1.12440°W		c. 1803	A house, later used for other purposes, it is stuccoed, with stone dressings, on a plinth, with a sill band, a cornice, parapets with blind balustraded panels, and hipped slate roofs. There are two storeys, fronts of three and four bays, and later additions to the southwest. The main front has three bays, a central enclosed porch with pilasters, an entablature with a moulded cornice and a parapet, and a doorway with an architrave and a fanlight. This is flanked by two-storey bow windows, in the ground floor with Venetian windows, and moulded cornices on scrolled consoles, and in the upper floor with balconies. Above the porch is a sash window in a round-arched recess. The garden front has four bays, divided by pilasters with friezes, and between are sash windows, two in the ground floor with segmental pediments, and those in the upper floor with balconies.	II
Hall Gate United Reformed Church; 53.52261°N 1.12936°W	—	1804	The church, which was enlarged in 1874, is in stone with a Welsh slate roof, and has two storeys, a front of three bays, and five bays on the sides. The ground floor projects on a moulded plinth, and has paired central doorways with fanlights, surrounds in polished granite, pilasters, and a frieze with triglyphs and medallions on carved consoles. Around this is an entablature with a moulded cornice, a parapet with moulded copings and balustraded panels. The upper floor has rusticated quoins, and three semicircular-arched sash windows with archivolts and voussoirs. At the top is a balustraded parapet with an inscribed central panel and square end piers.	II
22, 23 and 23A South Parade; 53.52180°N 1.12803°W		c. 1808	A stuccoed house on a plinth, later used for other purposes, with stone dressings, a sill band, a moulded eaves cornice, and a tile roof, hipped on the right. There are three storeys, a partial basement, and seven bays, the middle three bays slightly projecting under a frieze and a pediment. In the centre is a Doric porch with pilasters, a frieze, and a modillion cornice, and a doorway with a moulded architrave, and a fanlight. The middle three bays are flanked by giant Ionic pilasters, and the windows are sashes, those in the middle floor with balconies, square over the porch, and segmental in front of the other windows.	II
17 High Street; 53.52318°N 1.13355°W		1810	A house, later a shop, on a corner site with a rounded corner, it is stuccoed and has stone dressings, a bracketed eaves gutter, and a slate roof, hipped on the corner. There are three storeys, two bays on High Street and three on Scot Lane. In the ground floor is a modern shop front, and the upper floors contain sash windows.	II
1 and 2 Regent Terrace and railings 53.52129°N 1.12482°W	—	c. 1819	A pair of houses, later offices, they are stuccoed, with stone dressings, a sill band, embattled parapets, and a tiled Mansard roof. There are three storeys, attics and basements, and three bays. The paired doorways in the centre have pointed heads, moulded architraves, and ogee hood moulds. These are flanked by two-storey canted bay windows containing sashes, flat-headed in the ground floor and with pointed heads above. Above the doorways is a blind panel with a pointed head, and over that is a tripartite window with a blind central panel. The outer bays contain sash windows, and in the attic are three dormers. Enclosing the basement areas are railings, and steps lead down to the basements.	II
3 Albion Place; 53.52099°N 1.12400°W	—	Early 19th century	A house, later offices, it is stuccoed on a plinth, with stone dressings, a sill band, a timber cornice, and a slate roof. There are three storeys and two bays. Steps lead up to the doorway on the left that has pilasters, a semicircular fanlight, and a moulded cornice. The windows are sashes.	II
44 and 46 Bennetthorpe; 53.51932°N 1.11820°W	—	Early 19th century	A pair of red brick houses with dressings in stone and brick, sill bands, a wooden eaves board, and a tile roof. There are two storeys and three bays. In the centre are paired doorways with pilastered jambs, fanlights, and an entablature. These are flanked by two-storey bow windows with moulded cornices. The other windows are sashes, those in the top floor with cambered arches, and the middle window tripartite.	II
48 and 50 Bennetthorpe; 53.51932°N 1.11803°W	—	Early 19th century	A pair of red brick houses with dressings in stone and brick, sill bands, bracketed eaves, and a tile roof. There are three storeys, and each house has two bays. In each house is a canted bay window with pilasters and moulded cornices, and outside these are doorways, each with engaged columns and a moulded cornice. The upper floors contain sash windows with cambered heads, and in front of the middle floor windows in No. 50 is a balcony.	II
52 and 54 Bennetthorpe; 53.51929°N 1.11785°W	—	Early 19th century	A pair of red brick houses at the end of a terrace, with dressings in stone and brick, sill bands, a wooden eaves board, and a tile roof. There are three storeys, and each house has two bays. In the centre are paired doorways with pilastered jambs, fanlights, and an entablature. These are flanked by square bay windows with moulded cornices on brick plinths. The upper floors contain sash windows with cambered heads.	II
4–9 Christchurch Terrace and railings 53.52343°N 1.12584°W	—	Early 19th century	A terrace of six houses, partly stuccoed, on a plinth, with stone dressings, a continuous balcony on the middle floor, and a slate roof, hipped on the left. There are three storeys and basements, and each house has two bays, other than No. 9, which has one bay on the front and three on the left return. Steps lead up to the doorways that have rectangular fanlights, and on the front are two bay windows, one square and the other canted. Most of the other windows are sashes, and all the openings have wedge lintels with keystones and incised voussoirs. In front of the basement areas are railings.	II
5 Hall Gate; 53.52274°N 1.13162°W	—	Early 19th century	A house, later used for other purposes, it is stuccoed, with stone dressings, a moulded timber cornice, and a slate roof. There are three storeys and two bays. In the ground floor is a 20th-century shop front, and the upper floors contain sash windows.	II
7 and 7A Hall Gate; 53.52272°N 1.13141°W	—	Early 19th century	A house, later shops, stuccoed with stone dressings, a dentilled and moulded eaves cornice, and a slate roof. There are three storeys and five bays, and a narrow bay on the right. In the ground floor are 20th-century shops fronts, and a doorway in the narrow bay. The middle floor contains tall casement windows, and a sash window in the narrow bay. In the top floor are sash windows in architraves, and a blind window in the narrow bay.	II
26 Hall Gate; 53.52232°N 1.12897°W		Early 19th century	A house on a corner site, later offices, in stuccoed stone on a plinth, with a moulded eaves cornice, and a slate roof, hipped on the corner. There are three storeys, attics and a basement, a front of three bays, and two bays on the left return. Steps lead up to the central doorway that has pilasters, a semicircular fanlight with a moulded arch, a frieze with triglyphs, a moulded cornice, and a blocking course surmounted by urns in relief. Above are sash windows, the window in the middle floor with a balustraded apron. The outer bays are bowed and contain tripartite windows, those in the middle floor with iron balconies.	II
27 Hall Gate; 53.52229°N 1.12888°W		Early 19th century	A house, later used for other purposes, it is stuccoed with stone dressings, stepped eaves, and a tile roof. There are three storeys and three bays. In the ground floor is a 20th-century shop front with a recessed doorway on the right. The middle floor contains a canted bay window flanked by blind recesses, and in the top floor are sash windows.	II
52 Hall Gate; 53.52239°N 1.13097°W		Early 19th century	A house, later an office, it is stuccoed, with stone dressings, a bracketed timber eaves cornice, and a tile roof. There are three storeys and two bays. In the ground floor is a 20th-century shop front, and the upper floors contain sash windows.	II
53 and 54 Hall Gate; 53.52241°N 1.13115°W		Early 19th century	Two houses, later used for other purposes, the building is stuccoed, the ground floor rusticated, on a plinth, with sone dressings, a sill band, a moulded eaves cornice, and a slate roof. There are three storeys and five bays. In the centre is a double doorway with panelled pilasters, fluted consoles, a frieze, and a modillion cornice. At the far left and far right are round-arched doorways with semicircular fanlights. The upper floors contain sash windows, those in the middle floor with incised voussoirs and keystones, and iron bowed balconies.	II
18 High Street; 53.52316°N 1.13353°W		Early 19th century	A house, later used for other purposes, it is in painted brick with stone dressings, a wooden eaves board, and a slate roof. There are three storeys and two bays. In the ground floor is an early 20h-century shop front with a recessed entrance and windows with pilasters. The upper floors contain sash windows.	II
19 and 20 High Street; 53.52312°N 1.13342°W		Early 19th century	A pair of houses, later used for other purposes, they are stuccoed with stone dressings, a rendered eaves band, and a coped parapet. There are three storeys and four bays. In the ground floor is a 20th-century shop front, and the upper floors contain sash windows, those in the middle floor with moulded cornices on scrolled consoles, and in the top floor with architraves.	II
22 High Street; 53.52304°N 1.13320°W		Early 19th century	A house, later a shop, in painted brick with a wooden eaves board and a pantile roof. There are three storeys and one bay. In the ground floor is a 20th-century shop front, the middle floor contains a casement window, and in the top floor is a tripartite sash window.	II
42 High Street; 53.52293°N 1.13362°W		Early 19th century	A house, later offices, stuccoed, with stone dressings, a sill band, a wooden eaves board, and a slate roof. There are three storeys and four bays. In the ground floor is a 20th-century shop front, with banded rustication between the openings, and a dentilled cornice. The upper floors contain sash windows in moulded architraves, those in the middle floor also with friezes and moulded pediments.	II
28 and 29 Market Place; 53.52429°N 1.13180°W	—	Early 19th century	A pair of houses, later used for other purposes, they are stuccoed, with stone dressings, a sill band, and a tile roof. There are three storeys, and each building has two bays. In the ground floor are 20th-century shop fronts, and most of the windows in the upper floors are sashes.	II
47 and 48 Market Place; 53.52426°N 1.13335°W		Early 19th century	A pair of houses, later a shop, in painted brick with stone dressings, boxed eaves, and a slate roof. There are three storeys and two bays, and a narrow bay to the right. In the ground floor is a 20th-century shop front, the left two bays in the middle floor contain bow windows, in the top floor the windows are tripartite sashes, and the narrow bay contains smaller sash windows.	II
4–13 Priory Place; 53.52255°N 1.13479°W		Early 19th century	A terrace of ten houses, later shops and offices, on a plinth, they are stuccoed with brick dressings, a stepped eaves band, and most have slate roofs with some tiled. There are three storeys, No. 4 has three bays, and the others have two bays each. In the ground floor, No. 4 has a bow window, and to its left is a doorway with an elliptical arch, rusticated voussoirs, a keystone, moulded imposts, and an entablature, and the other buildings have 20th-century shop fronts. In the middle floor are tall sash windows with aprons, and the top floor contains smaller sash windows.	II
4 South Parade and railing 53.52091°N 1.12541°W	—	Early 19th century	A house, later an office, it is stuccoed, with stone dressings, a sill band, an eaves band, and a slate roof. There are three storeys and a basement, and one bay. Steps lead down to the basement, which contains a doorway and a sash window. The doorway has a semicircular-arched head and a fanlight, and to its left is a shallow bow window. The middle floor contains an oriel bow window, with an ironwork balcony, a moulded cornice, and a lead roof. In the top floor are two sash windows, and the basement area is enclosed by railings.	II
5 South Parade and attached railings 53.52094°N 1.12550°W	—	Early 19th century	A house, later an office, it is in painted brick, with stone dressings, a sill band, an eaves band, and a slate roof. There are three storeys and a basement, and one bay. Steps lead down to the basement, which contains a doorway and a small fixed window. The doorway has a semicircular-arched head and a fanlight, and to its left is a shallow bow window. The middle floor contains an oriel bow window, with an ironwork balcony, a moulded cornice, and a lead roof. In the top floor are two sash windows, and the basement area is enclosed by railings.	II
6 South Parade and attached railings 53.52096°N 1.12558°W	—	Early 19th century	A house, later an office, it is stuccoed, with stone dressings, sill bands, an eaves band, and a slate roof. There are three storeys, an attic and a basement, and one bay. Steps lead down to the basement, which contains a doorway and a sash window. The doorway has a semicircular-arched head and a fanlight, and to its left is a shallow bow window. The middle floor contains an oriel bow window, with an ironwork balcony, a moulded cornice, and a lead roof. In the top floor are two sash windows, and in the attic is a gabled attic dormer. The basement area is enclosed by railings.	II
9, 10, 11, 12 and 12A South Parade; 53.52116°N 1.12619°W		Early 19th century	A terrace of five houses, later offices, they are stuccoed, with stone dressings, overhanging eaves, paired gutter brackets, and roofs of tile and slate. There are three storeys, five bays, and a narrow recessed bay to the left, the middle bay taller and with a pediment. The near-central doorways are round-headed with attached Doric columns, a triglyph frieze, and a moulded cornice, and the other doorways have flat heads and pilasters. Most of the windows are sashes, the middle house has a two-storey bow window, there are first floor bow windows with balconies in the outer houses, and there are tripartite windows in the top floor of the middle house and the ground floor of No. 12.	II
Albion Place; 53.52070°N 1.12299°W	—	Early 19th century	A terrace of six houses, stepped down a slope, they are stuccoed, with stone dressings, sill bands, timber eaves cornices, and roofs of tile or slate. There are three storeys, and each house has two bays. Each house has a round-headed doorway with panelled pilasters, a semicircular fanlight, and a dentilled cornice. The windows are sashes, those in the middle floor with bracketed filigree ironwork balconies.	II
The Lodge; 53.52194°N 1.12460°W	—	Early 19th century	A house that was later extended and used as offices, it is stuccoed, on a plinth, with stone dressings, bracketed eaves, and a hipped slate roof. There are two storeys, six bays, and a lower two-storey three-bay wing recessed on the left. On the front is a semicircular Tuscan with an entablature, a modillion cornice, and a semicircular-arched doorway with a fanlight. Elsewhere on the front are a segmental-arched carriage entrance with a keystone and imposts, windows, and more doorways. Above the porch is a recessed segmental arch with a sash window and a balcony.	II
43 High Street; 53.52298°N 1.13374°W	—	1826	The portico of a building that has been demolished, it is in painted stone, and has one tall storey, and one bay. At the front are two Ionic columns with flanking Tuscan pilasters, an entablature, and a moulded cornice. Above is a parapet with a moulded plinth and coping, containing three panels, the outer ones with balustrading, and the centre one with a laurel leaf swag. Above is a anthemion acroteria on a stepped base.	II
Christ Church; 53.52330°N 1.12696°W		1827–29	The chancel of the church was enlarged in 1862–63 to designs by George Gilbert Scott. The church is built in limestone with a slate roof, and it consists of a nave, aisles, a chancel with a west vestry, and a south tower. The tower has four stages, the lower two square, and the upper two octagonal. There are clasping octagonal buttresses rising to pinnacles with crocketed finials, and a south doorway, and each stage has an embattled parapet. The second stage contains a three-light window and a niche, and the upper stages are recessed. The third stage has clock faces, bell openings, and flying buttresses, and in the top stage are trefoil-headed lancet windows with crocketed gablets, and it is surmounted by a copper spire.	II*
3 and 4 Regent Terrace and railings 53.52124°N 1.12465°W	—	By 1828	A pair of houses, stuccoed and incised to resemble stone, with stone dressings, bands, a timber eaves band, and a tile roof. There are three storeys, basements and attics, and five bays. Steps lead down to the basements which contain doorways and sash windows, and the area is enclosed by railings. In the centre are paired semicircular-headed doorways with raised surrounds, fanlights, and moulded hoods on consoles. These are flanked by two-storey canted bay windows rising from the basements, with dentilled cornices and hipped roofs. Above the doorways is a blind opening with an architrave and a moulded pediment, the top floor contains five sash windows, the centre one with an architrave, and in the attic of No. 4 is a flat-headed dormer.	II
5, 6 and 7 Regent Terrace and railings 53.52118°N 1.12442°W	—	By 1828	A terrace of three houses, later offices, in stone, partly colourwashed, with a sill band, a moulded cornice, and roofs of stone slate and asbestos slate. There are three storeys and basements, Nos. 5 and 6 have two bays, each and No. 7 has four. The basements are rusticated on a plinth. All the houses have doorways approached by steps, with Tuscan half-columns, fanlights, entablatures, and moulded cornices. Nos. 5 and 6 have bow windows rising from the basements, and the other windows are sashes, those in the middle floor with elaborate ironwork balconies. Enclosing the basement areas are railings.	II
Priory Methodist Church; 53.52202°N 1.13527°W		1832	The entrance was added to the church in 1881. It is in painted and stuccoed stone, on a plinth, the ground floor rusticated, with bands, a frieze, a moulded cornice, and a parapet stepped up in the centre with an inscribed panel, over which is a cornice and blocking course with the date and an anthemion, and the roof is slated. There are two storeys and a front of five bays. The middle three bays in the ground floor project, and each contains a semicircular-arched doorway with a fanlight, between which are rusticated pilasters, and over which is a moulded cornice and an anthemion. The side bays contain sash windows, and in the upper floor are semicircular-headed windows with pilasters.	II
51 Hall Gate; 53.52237°N 1.13086°W		Early to mid 19th century	A house, later offices, in red brick with a wooden eaves board and a slate roof. There are three storeys and five bays, the right bay narrower. In the ground floor is a 20th-century shop front and a doorway in the right bay, and the upper floors contain sash windows, those in the middle floor with iron balconies.	II
49A Market Place; 53.52417°N 1.13362°W	—	Early to mid 19th century	A house and warehouse, later used for other purposes, it is in red brick with a pantile roof. There are two storeys and three bays. Most of the ground floor openings have been altered, and in the upper floor are three sash windows under cambered arches.	II
21 High Street; 53.52310°N 1.13329°W	centre2	1841	Built as public meeting rooms, later used for other purposes, the building is in stone, with moulded sill string courses, a stepped frieze, a bracketed cornice, and plain parapets with moulded copings. There are three storeys and three bays, and in the ground floor is a 20th-century shop front. The middle floor contains round-arched windows with pilasters, moulded archivolts, panelled keystones, and large dentilled open pediments on consoles and imposts. In the top floor are sash windows in architraves, with paterae in the top corners.	II
Former Yorkshire Bank; 53.52331°N 1.13383°W		1843	The former bank, with was extended in 1906, is in stone, on a plinth, and the ground floor is rusticated. The original part has three storeys, three bays on High Street, one on Scot Lane, and a curved bay on the corner. It has an eaves band, and a moulded cornice on large corniced console brackets. The extension has two storeys and seven bays, and plan parapets. The openings in the ground floor have round-arched heads with voussoirs, impost bands, and keystones. The three bays in the middle floor on the corner have a balcony, the central window with a dentilled broken segmental pediment, and the flanking windows with dentilled cornices. In the Scot Lane front is a middle floor window flanked by Ionic columns, with a segmental balustraded balcony, and a shell head, over which is an open segmental pediment.	II
Railings and gate piers, Christ Church; 53.52294°N 1.12767°W	—	c. 1844	The railings enclosing the churchyard are in iron, and stand on a chamfered stone plinth. The gate piers are in stone, and are square, with moulded plinths, and each has panelled sides, cusped heads, and stepped domed capitals with brattishing at the top.	II
Market Hall, Corn Exchange and Fish Market; 53.52458°N 1.13268°W		1846	The market hall is the earlier, with the corn exchange added in 1870–73. The buildings are in stone, on a plinth, the ground floor rustication, and with roofs of slate and lead, partly glazed. There are two storeys, the market hall had a U-shaped plan, the corn exchange was built in the "U" and it projects, and in 1930 a single-storey extension was added. Inside the market hall are cast iron columns with foliage capitals, and the former corn exchange has galleries on three sides.	II*
6 Hall Gate; 53.52273°N 1.13152°W	—	Mid 19th century	A house, later used for other purposes, it is in red brick, with dressings in stone and brick, a stepped and cogged eaves band, and a slate roof. There are three storeys and two bays. In the left bay is a doorway with a plain surround and a rectangular fanlight, and to the right is a shop window. The upper floors contain sash window with keystones.	II
Original plant works, Doncaster Works; 53.52090°N 1.14128°W		1851	The railway works were designed by William and Joseph Cubitt, and the building is in red brick with dressings in brick and stone, with continuous stone sills, a projecting coped parapet, and a roof of Welsh slate and tile with roof lights. There are two storeys, 44 bays, and four projecting bays at the ends with dentilled pediments. Between the bays are pilasters, and the windows, some of which are casements and others fixed, have segmental heads. On the front is a bay window with a dentilled cornice, and on the roof at the left end is a timber bellcote with a hipped roof.	II
Main engine shop, Doncaster Works; 53.52032°N 1.14205°W		1853	The engine shop was built by the Great Northern Railway, and extended in the 1860s. It is in dark red brick with dressings in stone and brick and a corrugated plastic roof. There is a single tall storey, three wide gabled bays, 15 bays along the sides, and a boiler shop beyond with 13 bays. Between the bays on the sides are pilasters with friezes and cornices carrying an entablature and a dentilled cornice, and in each bay is a tall segmental-headed casement window.	II
Minster Church of St George; 53.52563°N 1.13539°W		1853–58	The church, which was designed by George Gilbert Scott, is built in stone with lead roofs. It has a cruciform plan, consisting of a nave with a clerestory, north and south aisles, a south porch, north and south transepts, a chancel with aisles, and a tower at the crossing. The tower has two tall stages, angle buttresses, a circular staircase tower to the northeast, bands of blind quatrefoils and bell flowers, a cornice and pierced crocketed and gableted parapets with corner and central pinnacles. At the west end is a doorway with a pointed head and a moulded surround, above which is a bust of Saint George. Over this is a seven-light window, and a figure of Christ under a canopy. The east window has eight lights, and around the church are buttresses rising to crocketed pinnacles.	I
Hamilton Lodge; 53.51693°N 1.11211°W	—	c. 1856	A house, later used for other purposes, it is stuccoed, on a plinth, with clasping corner pilasters, a plain eaves band, and a hipped tarred slate roof. There are two storeys, three bays, and a recessed two-bay wing on the left. Steps lead up to a central distyle in antis porch, with fluted columns and plain pilasters, all with a frieze of florets on the capitals, an entablature, and a blocking course. This flanked by tripartite bow windows, and in the upper floor are sash windows in architraves. The right return contains a square bay window.	II
St James' Church; 53.51890°N 1.13868°W		1857–58	The church was designed in collaboration with George Gilbert Scott for workers at the Great Northern Railway workshops. It is built in stone with tile roofs, and consists of two parallel ranges consisting of a nave with a chancel, an east porch, and a central tower on the south. The tower has a square base, with buttresses and a lancet window in the lower stage. The top corners taper to an octagonal bell stage, with trefoil-headed bell openings, over which is a ball flower cornice with corner gargoyles. This is surmounted by a spire with blind quatrefoils.	II
Railing to rear of St James' Church; 53.51895°N 1.13881°W	—	c. 1857–58	A straight length of railings about 40 metres (130 ft) long. It consists of a dwarf stone wall with chamfered coping, on which are iron railings with cusped finials and pierced quatrefoils forming a frieze at the top.	II
Water Tower, Doncaster Works; 53.52475°N 1.14219°W		c. 1860	The water tower was built by the Great Northern Railway. It is in red brick on a plinth, with dressings in yellow brick and stone, bands, and an elaborate corbelled and dentilled cornice. There are three storeys and an iron water tank, and sides of four and two bays. In each bay is a recessed arch with a semicircular head. In the ground floor, some bays contain doorways, and in the upper two storeys are sash windows with segmental-arched heads.	II
6A South Parade; 53.52100°N 1.12570°W	—	c. 1860–70	A house, later an office, in Gothic Revival style, in red brick with stone dressings, a moulded eaves cornice on corbels, and a slate roof with coped gables and moulded kneelers. There are two storeys and attics, and three bays. Steps lead up to the central segmental-headed doorway that has shafts with foliage capitals, a fanlight, and a hood mould. This is flanked by canted bay windows that have pilasters with foliage capitals, and a moulded cornice and blocking course. In the upper floor are windows with pointed arches, those in the outer bays paired, with roundels in the tympani of the pointed hood moulds. The attic has two gabled dormers with quatrefoils in the gables.	II
Former Wool Market; 53.52541°N 1.13162°W		{1861–63	The former wool market is now a general market. It has a single storey, sides of nine and seven bays, and four internal arcades. The east front, on Market Street, is in brick with stone dressings, on a plinth, with a corbelled cornice and a coped hipped slate roof. There are nine bays divided by pilasters. The left bay is gabled and contains the entrance with a segmental head, imposts, and a keystone, and in each of the other bays are three round-arched windows. On the north and west front are arcades carried on cast iron columns with decorative iron beams. The entrance from Market Place has a segmental iron arch with a pierced beam, and flanking panelled piers with ball finials.	II
Lamp standard, Hall Gate United Reformed Church; 53.52240°N 1.12955°W	—	Mid to late 19th century	The lamp standard in front of the church is in cast iron. It has a tall base and a plinth with chamfered top corners, decorated with a castle and a lion, and inscribed with the maker's name. The tapering stem has a bulbous base with foliage decoration, and on the top is a later octagonal lamp.	II
Hall Cross Academy; 53.52310°N 1.12450°W		1867–69	Originally a grammar school designed by George Gilbert Scott, it was extended in Moderne style in 1937–40. The original part is in red brick with sandstone dressings and a tile roof, and the extension is in brick and concrete, and has flat concrete roofs and pitched tiled roofs. The early part has two storeys and seven bays, buttresses, and an octagonal corner tower with a spire and lucarnes. The later part has a range of two storeys and ten bays, to the right is a tall stepped projecting square tower containing a doorway with a pointed arch, and behind are school buildings arranged around a courtyard.	II
Gate and walls, Elmfield House; 53.52029°N 1.12312°W		Late 19th century	The gateway is in stone, and in the style of the 17th century. It is about 10 feet (3.0 m) high, and flanked by walls about 6 feet (1.8 m) high running about 300 yards (270 m) to the east and 600 yards (550 m) to the west. The gateway has a semicircular-arched head, with rusticated jambs, radiating voussoirs, and a panelled keystone with a moulded pendent and a carved arched top, and it is surmounted by a moulded segmental broken and open pediment. The walls have flat copings, and adjacent to the gateway have scrolls.	II
St Mary's Church; 53.52939°N 1.12445°W	—	1884–85	The church was designed by Edmund Beckett and the chancel was added in 1912. It is in stone with a tile roof, and consists of a nave, north and south aisles, an east chancel flanked by vestries, and a west porch. On the west gable is a bellcote, and between the bays along the sides of the church are buttresses.	II
Barclays Bank; 53.52371°N 1.13493°W	—	1885	The bank is in stone on a plinth, with red brick at the rear, and it has three storeys and six bays, the outer bays slightly projecting. The outer bays contain doorways that have pilasters with fluted panels, and large open pediments on fluted consoles with swags, and the doors have semicircular fanlights, and archivolts with keystones. Between the doorways are sash windows with panelled aprons, divided by rusticated pilasters. The upper floors contain sash windows with architraves, those in the middle floor with triangular, segmental, or scrolled broken pediments, and in the top floor with scrolled tops. Above is an entablature with a central raised panel flanked by scrolls.	II
Post Office; 53.52307°N 1.13482°W		1885	The Post Office is in red brick with stone dressings, on a plinth, with string courses, and a slate roof with crested ridge tiles. There are three storeys and a basement, and four bays with moulded coped gables, the right bay projecting and wider. Between the bays are pilaster buttresses, rising to become triangular with finials. At the right end is a doorway with a three-light fanlight. Most of the windows are mullioned and transomed, in the ground floor with four-centred arched lights, in the middle floor with ogee tracery at the head, and in the top floor with stepped lights.	II
E2 New Erecting Shop, Doncaster Railway Works; 53.52174°N 1.14494°W	—	1890–91	The locomotive erecting shop was built for the Great Northern Railway. It has an iron frame, walls of orange brick on a plinth of blue brick, and a roof of metal sheet. Thee are twelve bays, and a rectangular plan. The main entrance at the southeast has two outer gables and a lower central narrower gable on three piers. The windows have iron frames and most have segmental heads. Inside, there are two erecting bays containing pits, a central aisle, and three overhead cranes.	II
1 Baxter Gate; 53.52393°N 1.13556°W		1894–95	The building on a corner site is in sandstone with a Welsh slate Mansard roof. There are three storeys and attics, three bays on Baxter Gate, one on French Gate, and an angled bay on the corner. In the ground floor is a modern shop front, the upper floors contain sash windows, and there are two pedimented dormers. At the top is a balustraded parapet, and on the corner is an octagonal clock tower with a stepped ogee domed lead roof with a weathervane.	II
Former Midland Bank; 53.52386°N 1.13520°W		1897	The bank, which is on a corner site, is in stone, on a plinth, with a slate roof, and a copper octagonal dome surmounted by a statue of Eros on a cupola. There are two storeys, a basement, and an attic storey, with six bays on High Street, four on Baxter Gate, and an angled bay on the corner. The round-headed entrance in the corner bay has pilasters, voussoirs, and a keystone with a lion's head, over which is a curved balustraded balcony. Between the bays on the sides are pilasters with deep rusticated plinths, on which are giant engaged Ionic columns. The basement windows have segmental heads, voussoirs and triple keystones, and the ground floor windows have semicircular heads, archivolts and radiating voussoirs. In the upper floor, the windows have segmental heads and architraves with keystones, above which is a modillion cornice. The windows in the top floor are sashes with architraves, and between them are statues.	II
Former Grand Theatre; 53.52283°N 1.13810°W		1899	The theatre, later used for other purposes, is stuccoed, and has a slate roof. The front is curved and has three storeys, the ground floor containing Doric pilasters and round-arched doorways. Above the ground floor is a continuous decorative iron balcony, and in the upper storeys are giant paired fluted Ionic pilasters, and windows, mostly round-headed, with one circular. At the top is an entablature, a balustraded parapet with finials and urns, and in the centre is a taller panel with a curved and shaped pediment.	II
Lloyds Bank; 53.52358°N 1.13523°W		1912	The bank is in Portland stone on a plinth, with rustication on the ground floor, an entablature, a frieze with triglyphs, a modillion cornice, and a stepped parapet with lattice decoration and an inscribed central panel. There are three storeys and five bays. The entrance on the left has a moulded architrave and an inscribed keystone, and over the ground floor is a moulded sill band. Between the bays in the upper floors are giant fluted columns and pilasters. The windows have architraves, the three central windows in the middle floor decorated with circle motifs, and in the top floor the windows have stepped heads, diamond motifs, and aprons.	II
Bennethorpe War Memorial; 53.51994°N 1.12207°W		1923	The war memorial is at the entrance to Elmfield Park. It consists of a stone obelisk 35 feet (11 m) high on a square pedestal on a stepped plinth. On the top of the obelisk is a carved female allegorical figure. Towards the top of the obelisk are carved laurel wreaths, and towards the base is a decorated band. On the south front is a coat of arms, above which is a bronze sword. On the front of the pedestal is an inscribed panel, and the other faces contain panels carved with various subjects.	II
Trustee Savings Bank; 53.52329°N 1.13461°W		1923–24	The bank, on a corner site, is in Greek Revival style. It is in Portland stone, on a deep plinth, with cornices, a parapet, and a hipped Mansard roof in Westmorland slate. There are two storeys, an attic storey, and attics, four bays on High Street, five on Priory Place, and a curved bay on the corner. Between the bays are giant fluted Ionic half-columns carrying an entablature with a dentilled cornice. The windows are sashes, and are recessed behind the columns. The entrance is in the corner bay, and has a carved surround, an architrave with a decorated frieze and a cornice, and includes a panel carved with a Classical scene. In the attics are flat-roofed dormers.	II
National Westminster Bank; 53.52345°N 1.13404°W		1924–28	The bank, designed by Walter Brierley, has a rusticated plinth of polished grey granite, above it is in stone and red brick, and it has a roof of Westmorland slate. There is one tall storey and seven bays. In the centre are four Ionic columns, and the outer bays are flanked by Ionic pilasters. In each outer bay is a doorway, each with a moulded architrave, a frieze with a keystone, and a cornice with scroll motifs on consoles. Above is a fixed window with an architrave and cornice, and over that is a panel containing a swag. There are similar panels over the flat-headed windows in the third and fifth bays. The other bays contain taller round-arched windows with carved keystones. At the top is an entablature with a dentilled and modillion cornice, and balustraded parapets divided by piers.	II
33 and 35 St Selpulchre Gate; 53.52280°N 1.13623°W		c. 1930	A limestone shop in Art Deco style, with three storeys and one bay. In the ground floor is a shop front in polished black granite with a stepped top, containing a central recessed bronze door, and flanking windows. Outside these are doorways, the left with an angled head and a hexagonal opening above. In the middle floor are three casement windows with Art Deco glazing, over which are three panels, and three more casement windows. At the top is a large inscribed panel, flanked by sculpted horses' heads.	II
St James' Pool and Health Club; 53.51937°N 1.13302°W	—	1932	This was built as a public baths, a Turkish and Russian baths suite, and a winter concert hall, and is in red brick, with sandstone dressings, and hipped and flat slate roofs. The main block has two storeys and seven bays, the middle three bays projecting under a pediment, and flanking single-storey ranges. In the centre is a portico with square Doric and fluted Ionic columns, a frieze, and a dentilled cornice. Above it is a window in a round-headed arch, with a carved coat of arms in the tympanum. Inside, there is a swimming pool with balconies on three sides and provision for underwater lighting, the former Turkish and Russian baths are in the basement, and there is much mosaic tiling throughout.	II
Booking Hall and offices, Doncaster railway station 53.52217°N 1.13928°W		1933	The station building was built for the London and North Eastern Railway, and is in red brick, with stone dressings and hipped slate roofs. The main block has a tall single storey and five bays, there are flanking lower two-storey single-bay wings, and across the front is a continuous canopy The main block and the wings have stone plinths, wide doorways with architraves, and casement windows with metal surrounds. In the main block, the windows rise above the canopy, above the middle and outer bays is an eaves band, the other bays contain a roundel, and over them is a stepped parapet. Inside, the booking hall is decorated with polished marble.	II
Co-operative Emporium and Danum House; 53.52222°N 1.13631°W		1938–40	A departmental store and offices, it has a steel frame and is clad in yellow brick and blue Vitrolite. The main block has five storeys, and the side wings have three, the corners are curved, and in the centre of the main block is a round staircase tower with a cornice. Along the ground floor are continuous shop fronts, the entrances with curved side windows, and over all is a canopy. The upper floors in the side wings have continuous strips of windows. On the north and south fronts are four-storey blocks, and to the east is an entrance for commercial vehicles.	II
