= Danum House =

Building in Doncaster, South Yorkshire, England

Coordinates: 53.5222°N 1.1361°W

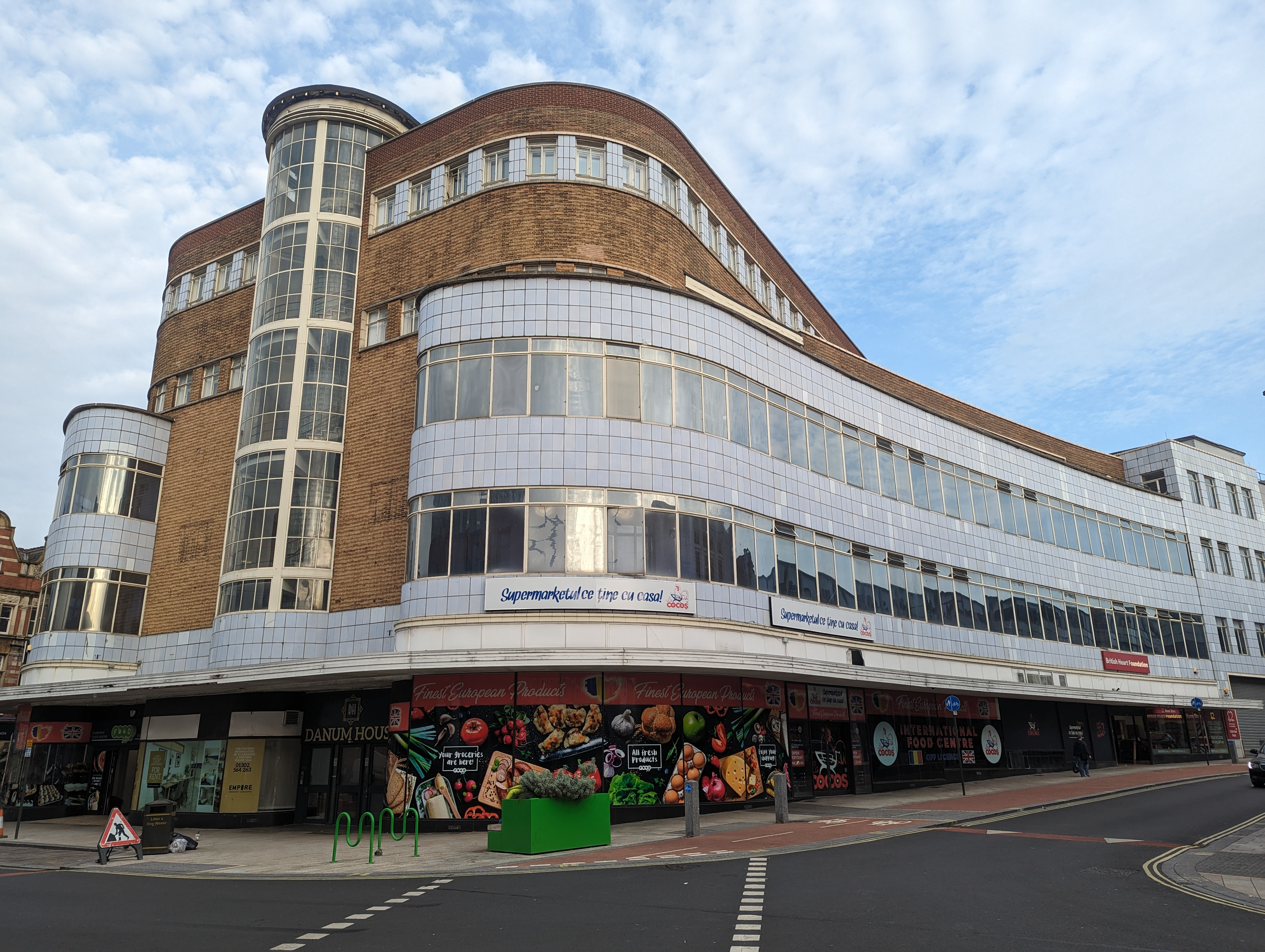
Southwest view of Danum House, in 2023

Danum House is a commercial building in Doncaster, in England.

== History ==
The Doncaster Co-operative Society operated a department store on St Sepulchre Gate in Doncaster. In the 1930s, it decided to open a replacement shop on the opposite site of the road. It was constructed from 1938 to 1940, to a design by local architect Henry Arthur Johnson. It was originally named the "Co-operative Emporium".

The building contained a ballroom on the third floor, at which performers included The Beatles, Johnny Dankworth and Cleo Laine. It later became a nightclub, known variously as Karisma, Romeo and Juliets, and Seventh Heaven, which closed in 2004. After attending the World Budgerigar Championships, James Hunt was barred from entering the club due to being drunk, and assaulted a doorman, leading to his arrest.

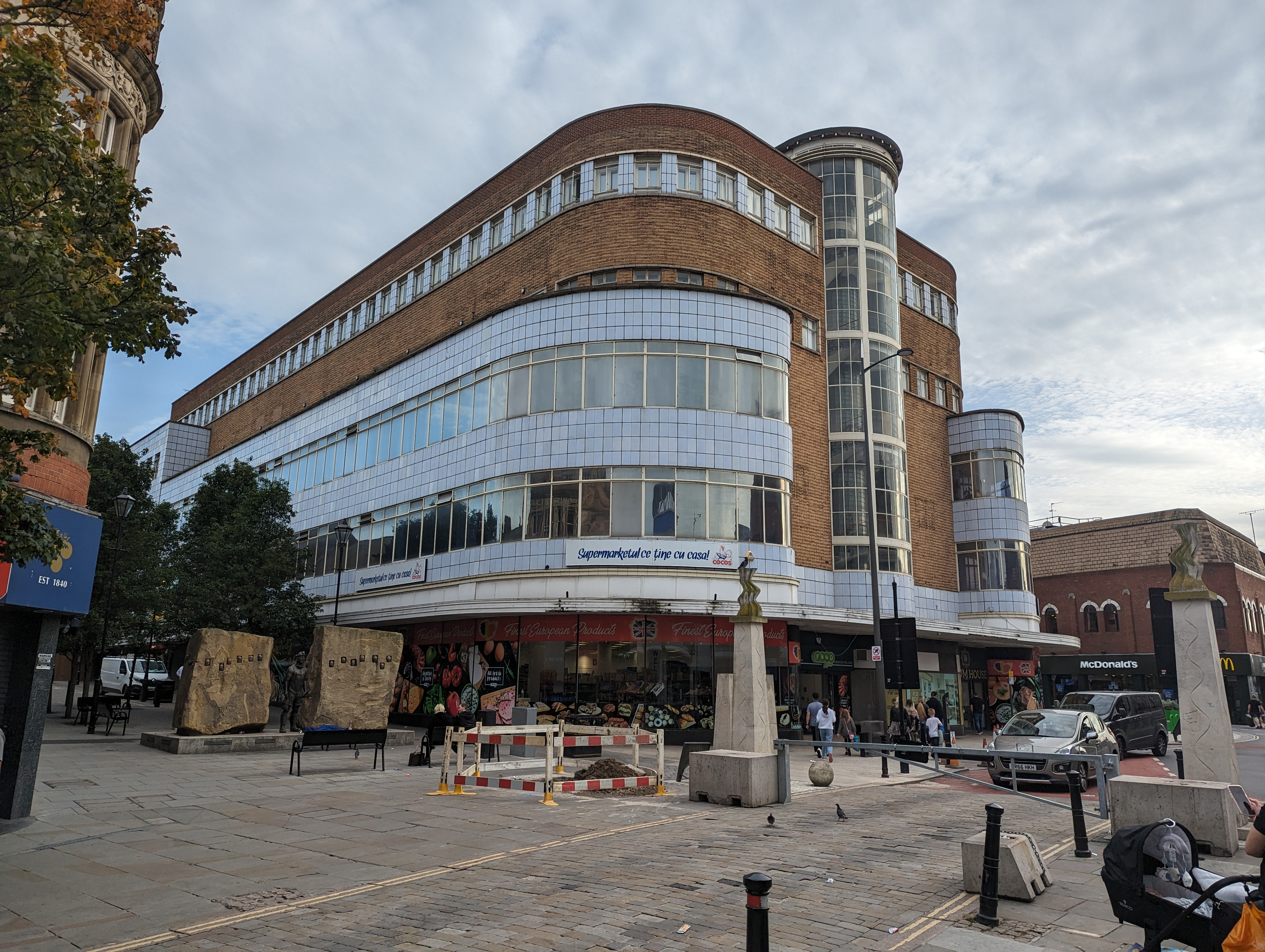
Northwest view of Danum House, in 2023

The Doncaster Co-operative Society merged into Co-operative Retail Services in 1969. In the 1970s, the building was renamed "Danum House". It was Grade II listed in 1997. Around this time, the Co-operative store closed, and in 2000, T. J. Hughes moved into the building. After T. J. Hughes closed in 2011, it was divided into smaller shops, with occupants including Peacocks and the British Heart Foundation, but it fell into poor repair. In 2019, the upper floors were converted into 78 flats, with a rooftop cinema.

== Architecture ==
Elain Harwood describes the building as "the most strikingly moderne Co-operative department store". Historic England says that it is "a surprisingly progressive design... which shows its European credentials... it would not have been out of place in contemporary Germany". The central block is five storeys high, clad with brick, and the wings are of three storeys, clad in Vitrolite tiles. In the centre is a glazed staircase tower, while the ground floor has continuous plate glass shopfronts, with bronzed window frames and black Vitrolite tiles below. The north and south facades have four storey blocks, that to Duke Street including a large goods entrance for lorries. Inside, the key features are the central and rear staircases, the central one surrounding a glass brick lift shaft.

== See also ==
- Listed buildings in Doncaster (Town Ward)
