= Doncaster Corn Exchange =

Municipal building in Doncaster, England

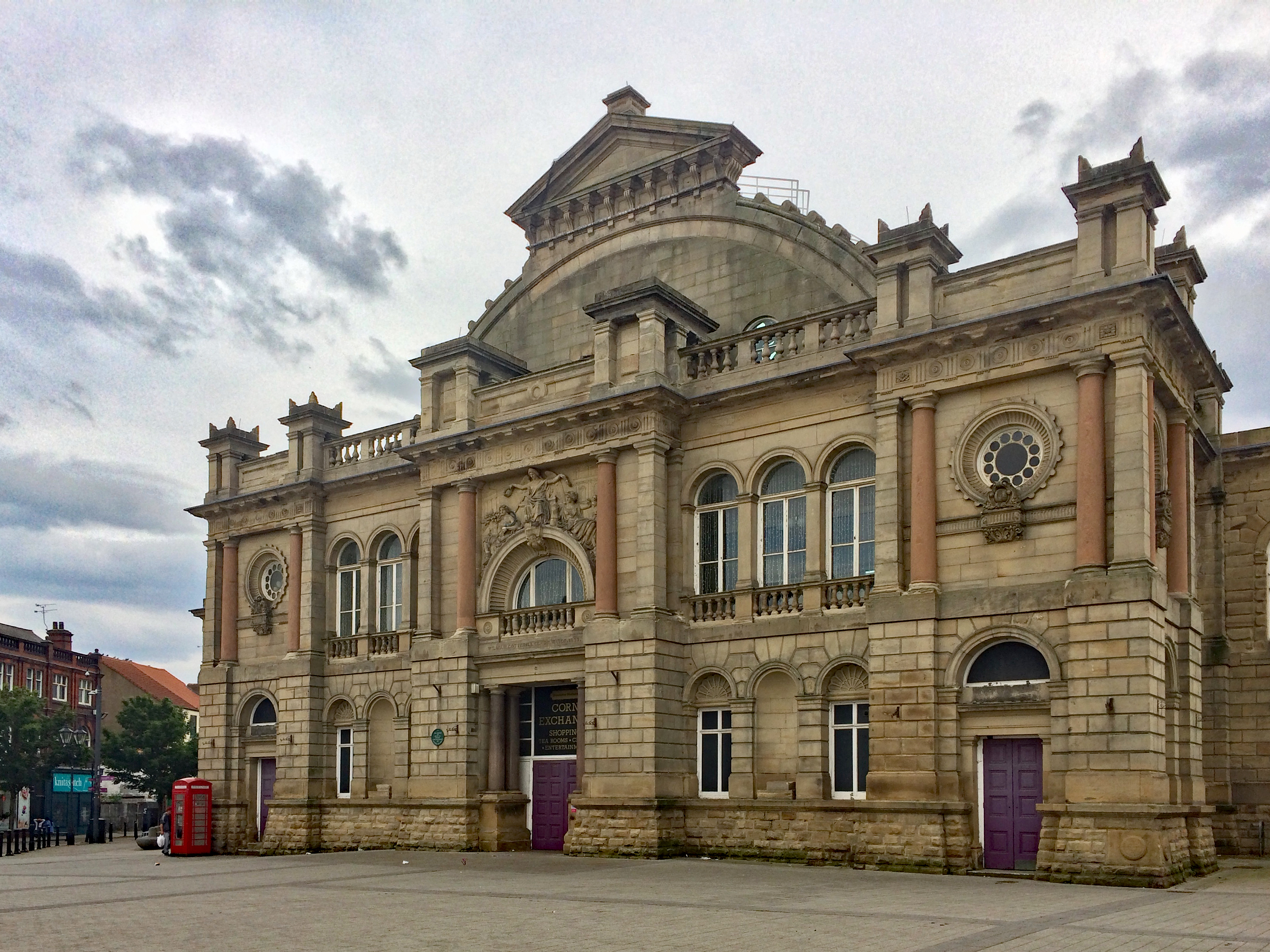
- Doncaster Corn Exchange

- Shown in South Yorkshire
- 53.5247°N 1.1325°W
- Location: The Market Place, Doncaster

History
- Built: 1873

Site notes
- Architect: William Watkins
- Architectural style: Neoclassical style

Listed Building – Grade II*
- Official name: The Market Hall, Corn Exchange and Fish Market
- Designated: 12 June 1950
- Reference no.: 1192688

The Corn Exchange is a trading space and events venue in Doncaster, South Yorkshire, England. The structure, which was commissioned as a corn exchange, is part of a Grade II* listed complex.

== History ==
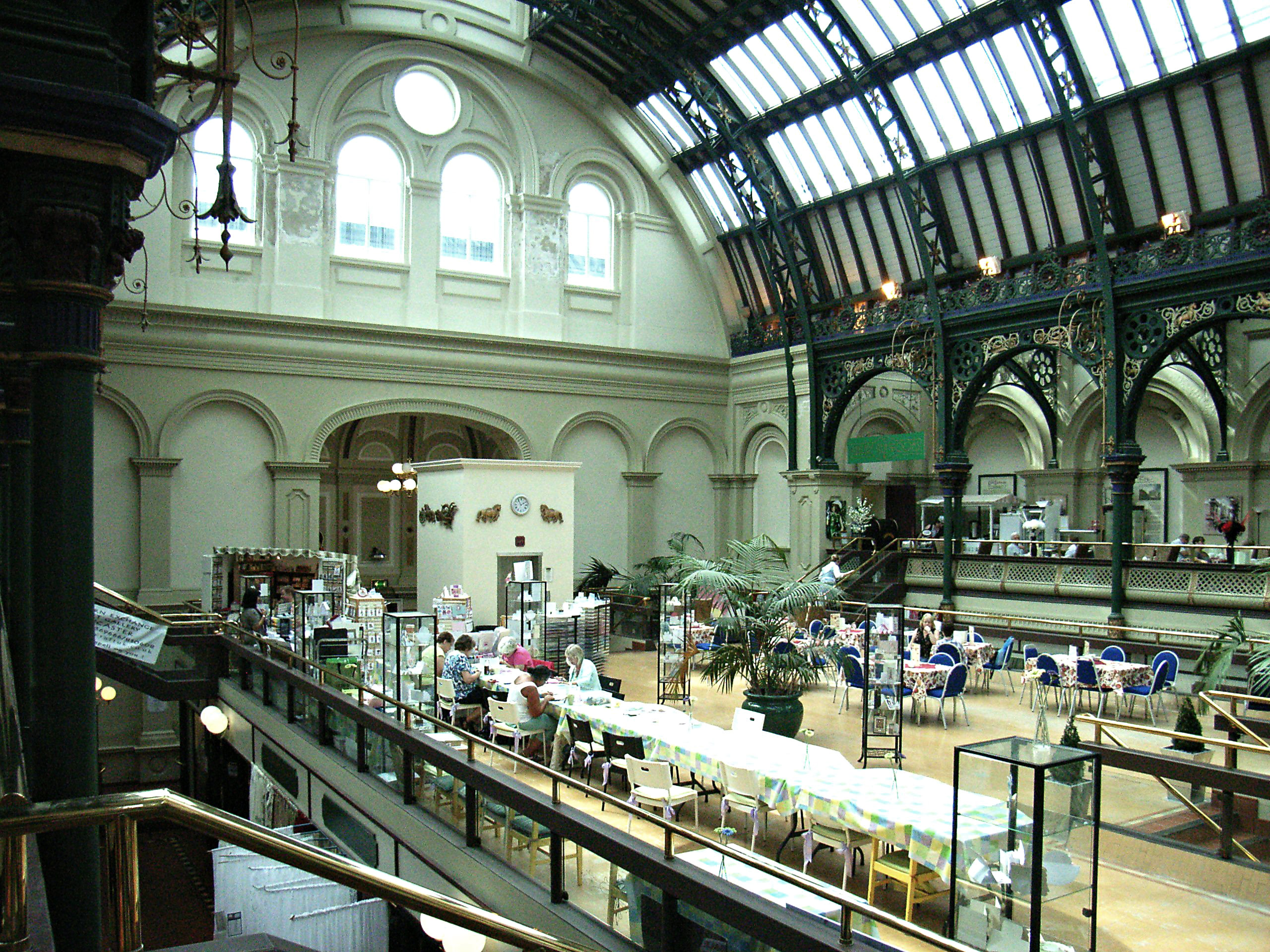
The interior of the Corn Exchange in 2011

The first corn exchange in Doncaster was a structure erected by Onions, Wheelhouse & Co at a cost of £900 and completed in 1844: it was a simple two-bay structure with iron columns supporting some girders and a pitched roof. In the late 1860s, civic leaders decided that the original structure was inadequate and should be replaced with a new structure: the site they selected was at the centre of the market hall in the Market Place which had been built to a U-shaped plan. Their intention was to use the new corn exchange to infill, and to project forward from, the "U" of the market hall.

The foundation stone for the new corn exchange was laid by the mayor, Arthur J. Smith, on 22 September 1870. The building was designed by William Watkins in the neoclassical style, built in ashlar stone and was officially opened by the mayor, William Cotterill Clark, on 17 April 1873.

The design involved a main frontage of five bays facing northeast onto the Market Place. The ground floor was rusticated. The central bay, which projected forward, featured a recessed doorway flanked by pairs of red sandstone Doric order columns supporting an entablature. On the first floor, there was a Diocletian window with an archivolt, surmounted by a sculpture of a female figure and flanked by Doric order columns and pilasters supporting an entablature and a parapet. The bays on either side of the central bay featured three round headed openings on each floor, with the central openings on the ground floor containing niches and the other openings containing windows with architraves. These bays were surmounted by balustraded parapets. The end bays, which also projected forward, featured round headed openings containing doorways with fanlights on the ground floor and oculi with tracery and archivolts on the first floor. The end bays were surmounted by parapets. Internally, the principal room was the main hall, which is described by Historic England as "very elaborate", with a three-sided gallery on the first floor.

The use of the building as a corn exchange declined significantly in the wake of the great depression of British agriculture in the late 19th century. However, the building was also extensively used as an events venue: in the early 20th century, the future Prime Minister, Winston Churchill, gave a talk in the corn exchange about his experiences during the Second Boer War, and, in 1909, the composer, Edward Elgar, conducted the London Symphony Orchestra there. After the First World War, speakers there included the politicians, Oswald Mosley and Aneurin Bevan, and, following the Second World War, the corn exchange became a municipal restaurant and dance hall. It was integrated into the main market hall in 1967. Following a major fire in 1994, the floor of the corn exchange was raised and the building re-opened in 1997.

The building closed for a £5 million refurbishment, to a design by Group Ginger Architects, in October 2022. The work was intended to create studios for artists and pop-up traders.

== See also ==
- Grade II* listed buildings in South Yorkshire
- Listed buildings in Doncaster (Town Ward)
- Corn exchanges in England
