= Mansion House, Doncaster =

Historic building in South Yorkshire, England

The Mansion House
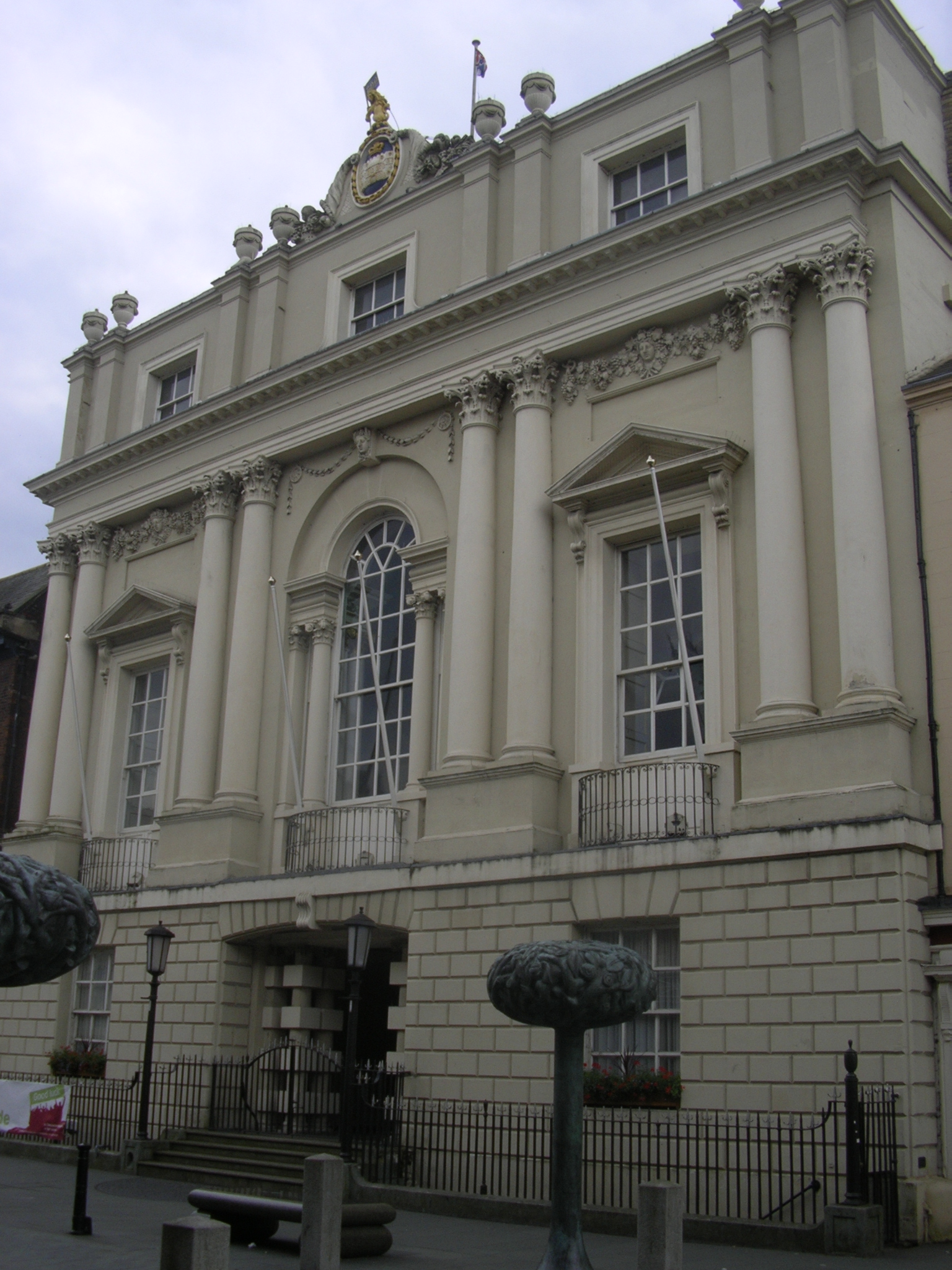
- Façade of the Mansion House

- Shown in South Yorkshire
- 53.5231°N 1.1341°W
- Location: High Street, Doncaster

History
- Built: 1749

Site notes
- Architect: James Paine
- Architectural style: Neoclassical style

Listed Building – Grade I
- Official name: The Mansion House and attached railings
- Designated: 14 February 1952
- Reference no.: 1151426

The Mansion House is a municipal building in Doncaster, South Yorkshire, England. The building, which is owned and managed by Doncaster Council, is a Grade I listed building.

== History ==
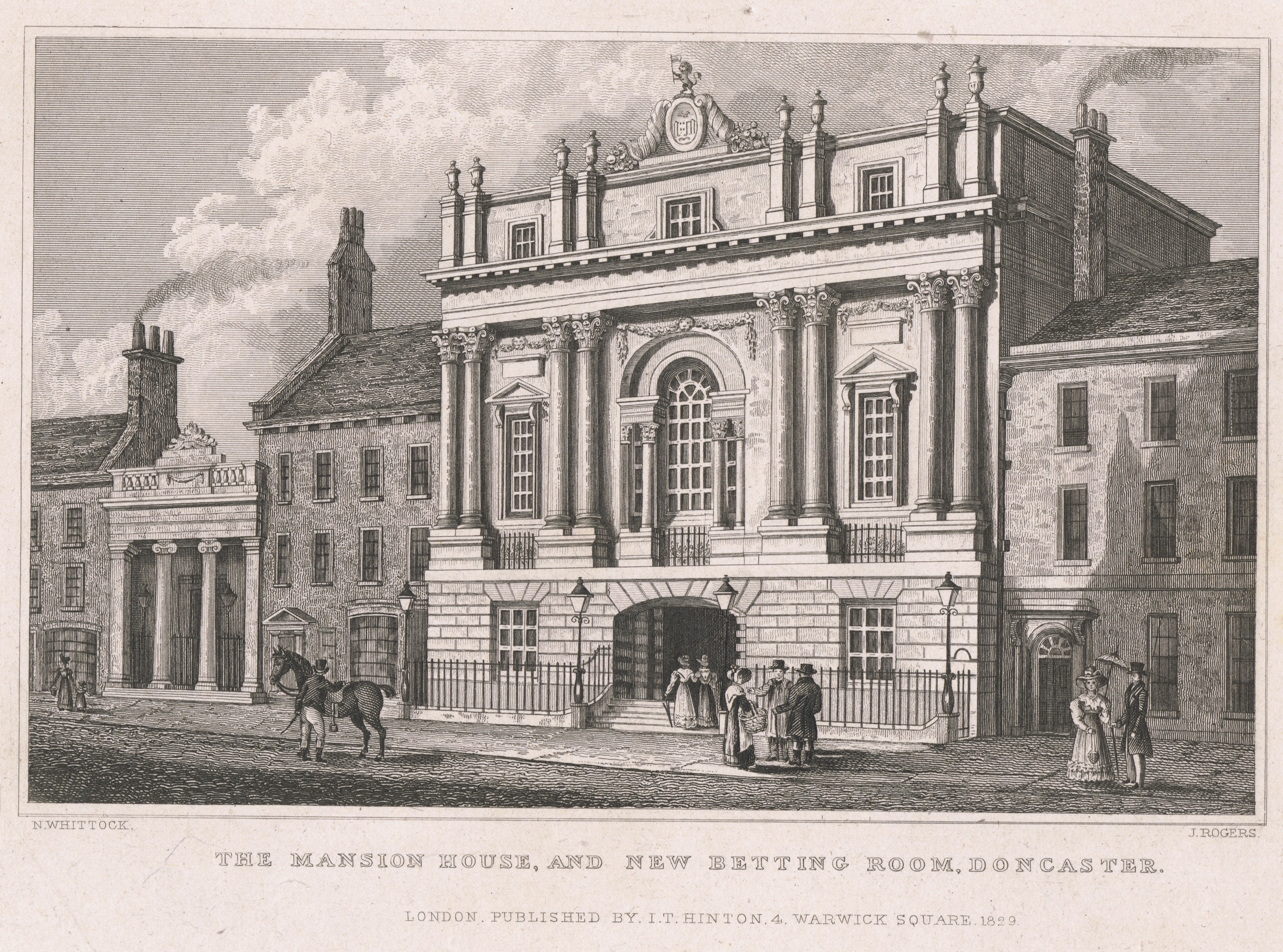
The Mansion House and New Betting Room, Doncaster, engraved by John Rogers after a drawing by Nathaniel Whittock, published by Isaac Taylor Hinton, (Note: Brother of John Howard Hinton) London, 1829.

The mansion house stands on the site of the Carmelite Friary, which had been established in Doncaster in 1350 and remained until its dissolution and destruction on 13 November 1538.

During the 18th century, Doncaster's position on the Great North Road brought wealth to the town. The town's corporation was frequently called on to host entertainments, initially at the mayor's house or the Angel or Three Cranes inns. In 1719, they took a lease on a house in the High Street for holding feasts, but let this lapse around 1727. They then bought a site on the High Street in 1738, with the intention of building a permanent base for entertaining, but little construction took place for several years. In 1746, James Paine was appointed as architect: although young, Paine had already worked on Nostell Priory and had designed Heath House, both near Wakefield. Mansion Houses had already been constructed in Newcastle upon Tyne (later demolished), York and London.

The building was designed in the neoclassical style, built in ashlar stone at a cost of £8,000, and was officially opened in April 1749. The design involved a symmetrical main frontage of three bays facing onto the High Street. The ground floor was rusticated and featured a wide central opening flanked by two square windows. The first floor featured a piano nobile, formed by a central round headed window flanked by sash windows with pediments, all separated by pairs of Corinthian order columns supporting an entablature and a modillioned cornice. William Lindley extended the building between 1801 and 1806, adding an attic storey, a rear banqueting hall and rear landing.

King Charles III, accompanied by Queen Camilla, visited the mansion house and conferred city status on Doncaster in November 2022.

== Friends of Doncaster Mansion House ==
The charity Friends of Doncaster Mansion House (Registered Charity Number 1171398) was formed in January 2015 "to support Doncaster Council to conserve, restore, research, interpret and display the Mansion House and its contents for the benefit for all sections of the community and for future generation to open up the Mansion House to the public". Friends of the Mansion House organised an open day at the mansion house in May 2016. In March 2017, the Friends of Doncaster Mansion House launched the James Paine Festival to celebrate the 300th anniversary of the birth of the architect.

== See also ==
- Grade I listed buildings in South Yorkshire
- Listed buildings in Doncaster (Town Ward)
