= St Sepulchre Gate =

Street in Doncaster, South Yorkshire, England

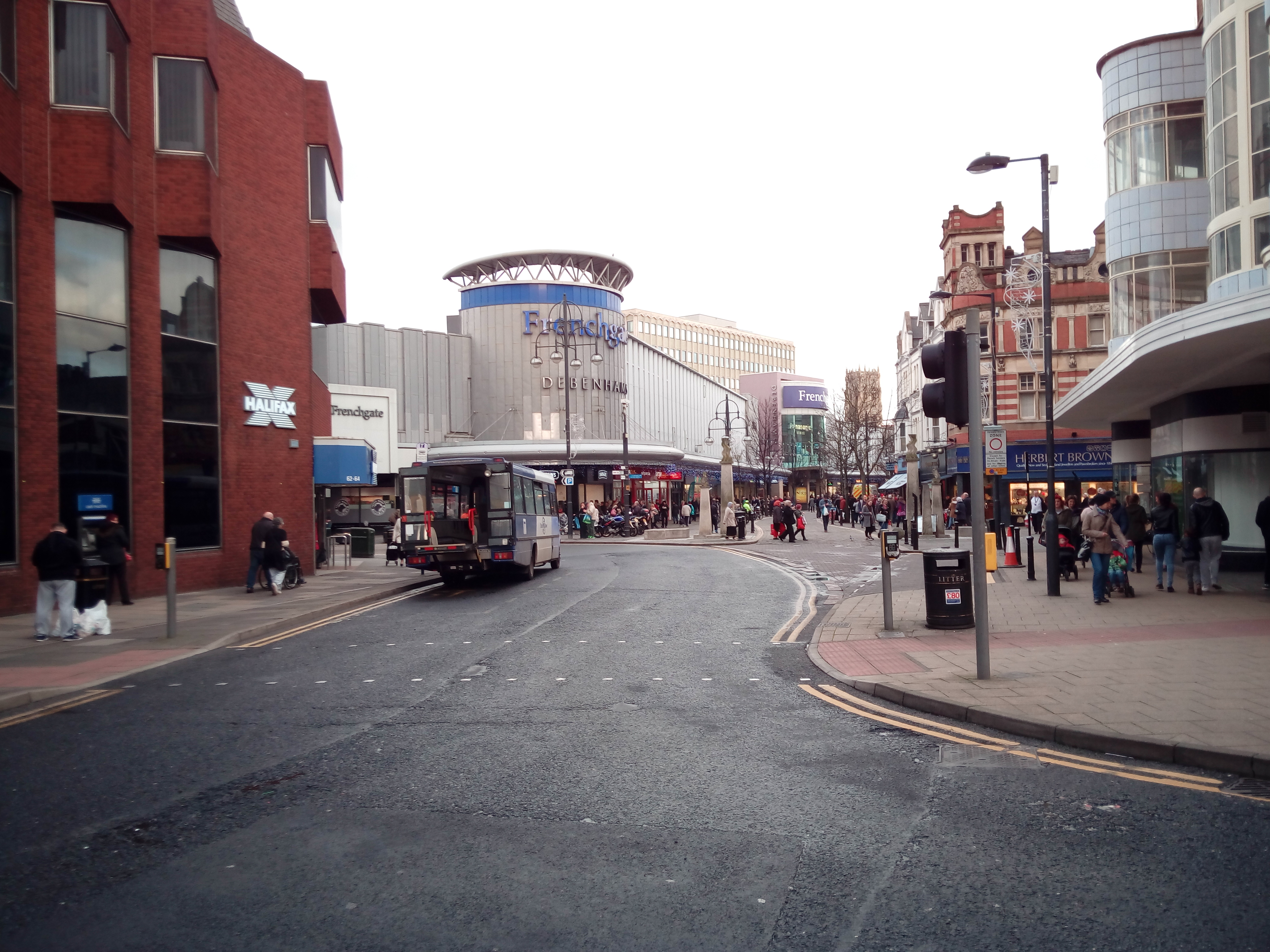
View north-east on St Sepulchre Gate, from its junction with Duke Street

St Sepulchre Gate is a pedestrianised street in the city centre of Doncaster, in South Yorkshire, England.

== History ==
The street lay outside the Roman and Saxon settlements of Doncaster. It emerged as the main route into the town from the south-west. It was built up in 12th century, around which time, one of the town's four stone gates was constructed to regulate access to the expanded area of the town. Part of the street outside the wall was also built up, as an early suburb of the town. In 1781, a Roman altar was found on the street. In 1557, the Hospital of St Thomas almshouses were built on the road, being rebuilt in the 1730s and finally demolished in 1963.

The road became one of the main shopping streets of the town; Doncaster Metropolitan Borough Council describe it as currently the principal shopping street. In 1902, a tramway was constructed along the road, operating until 1931. The street was widened in the early-20th century. In 1968, the Arndale Centre (later known as the Frenchgate Centre) opened on the north-west side of the street.

== Layout and architecture ==
The road runs south-west, from the junction of Baxter Gate, Frenchgate and High Street, to Trafford Way. Beyond the main road, its former route continues as St Sepulchre Gate West, terminating at a junction with St James's Bridge. On its south-east side, it has junctions with Printing Office Street, Duke Street, and Spring Gardens, while on its north-west side, it has junctions with West Laith Gate, and the western section has a junction with West Street.

Notable buildings on the street include 33 St Sepulchre Gate, an art deco shop and pub built about 1930, and Danum House, a 5-storey office block and shop, built for the Doncaster Co-operative Society. On St Sepulchre Street West is St James' Church, built in 1858.
