= High Street (Doncaster) =

Street in South Yorkshire, England

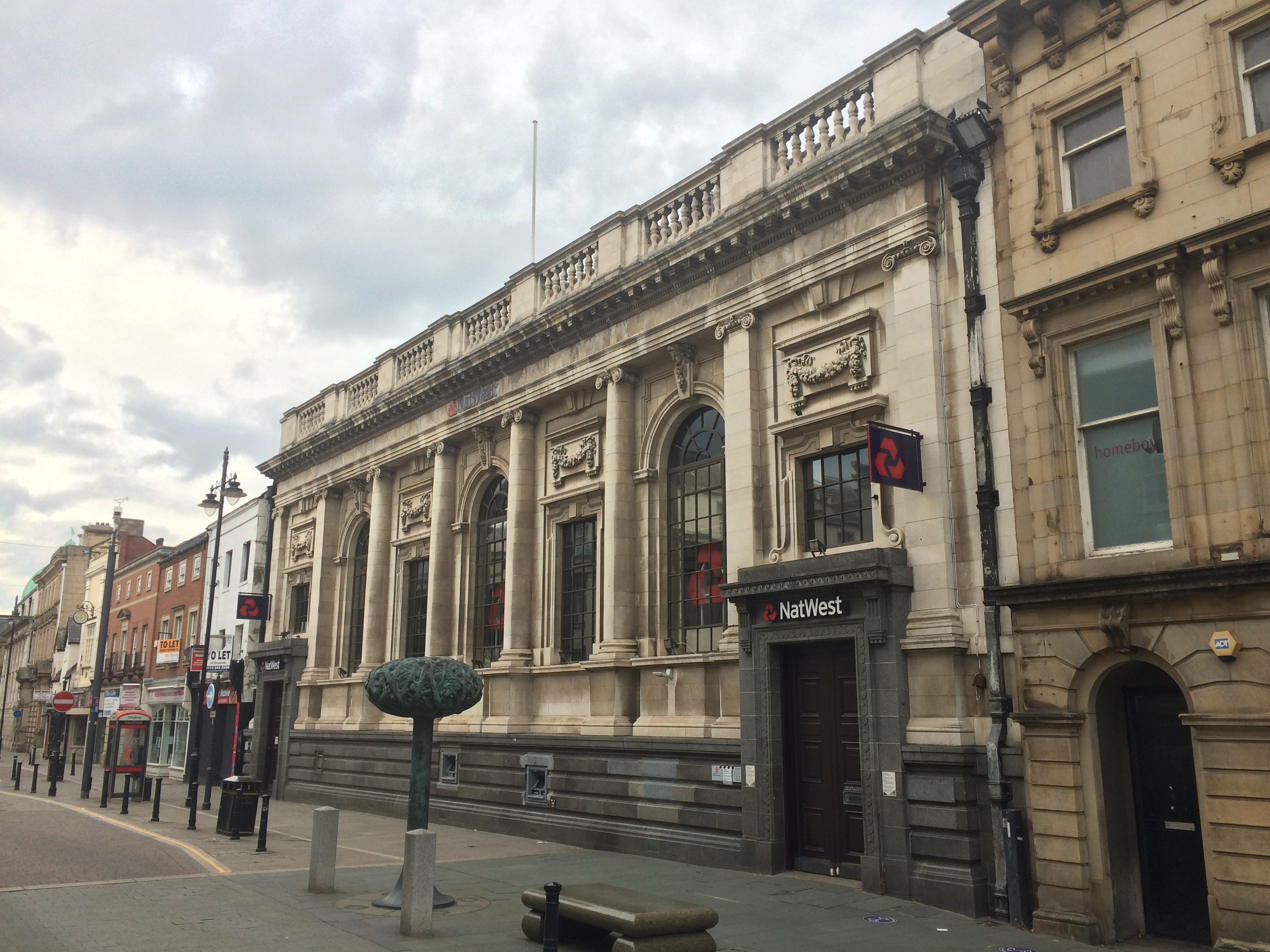
North-west side of High Street

High Street is a street in the city centre of Doncaster, in South Yorkshire, England.

== History ==
The street originated as the alternative route of Ermine Street, passing by the fort of Danum. It was built up in 12th century, around which time, the town's fortification were expanded. It lay entirely within the new borough, leading out to one of the four stone gates, at its junction with Hall Gate. It formed part of the Great North Road, and then the A1 road, until the A1(M) motorway was constructed as a by-pass. In 1346, a Carmelite friary was built to the south-west of the street.

In 1902, a tramway was constructed along the street, which operated until 1930. The street was made a conservation area in 1977. Doncaster Metropolitan Borough Council describes it as one of the town's "most prestigious thoroughfares", with "massive scale, stone construction and blend of civic and corporate character". Most of the buildings are financial or professional services, with some retail.

== Layout and architecture ==
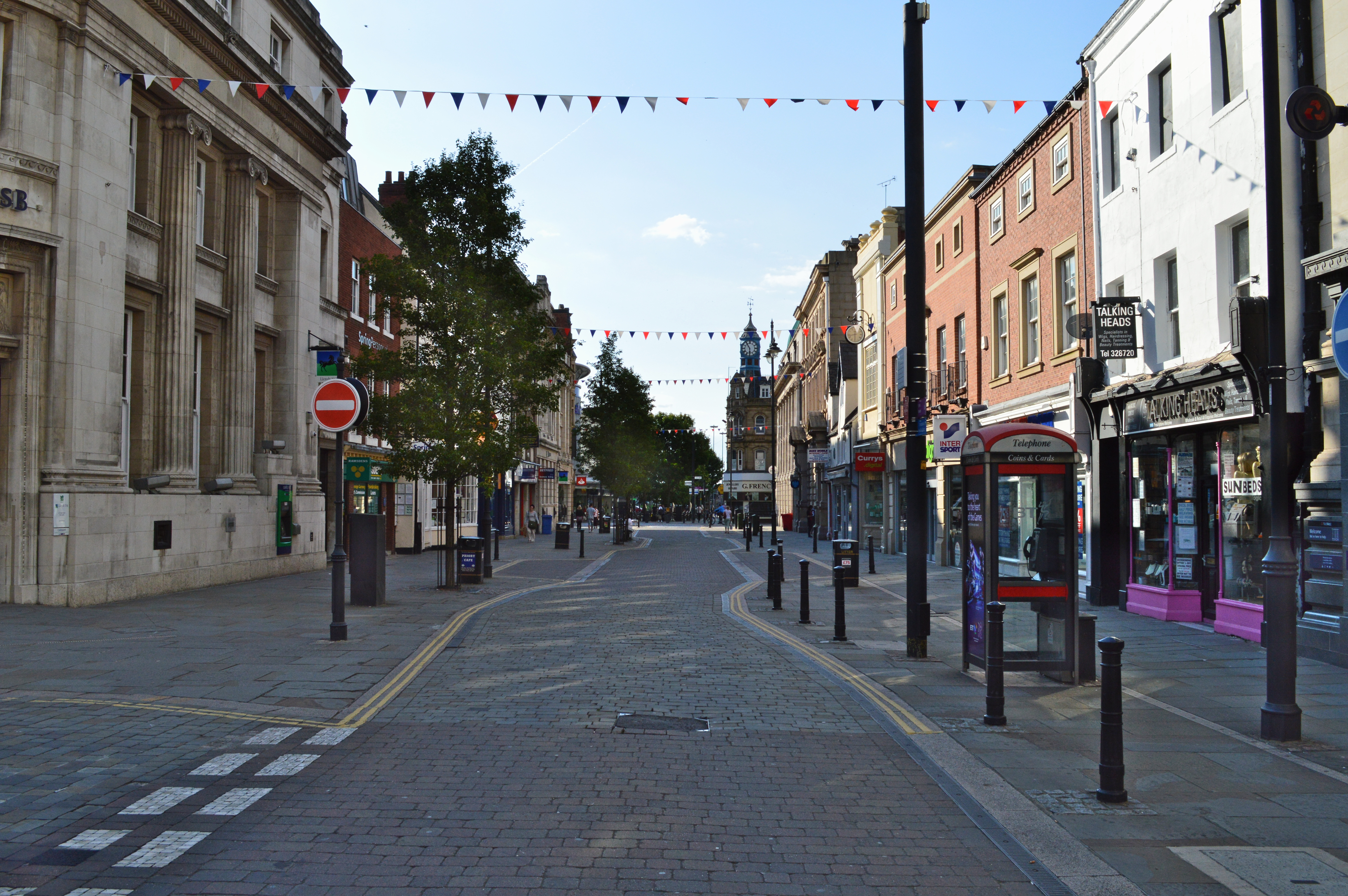
South-east side of High Street

The road runs south-east, from the junction of Baxter Gate, Frenchgate and St Sepulchre Gate, to a junction with Hall Gate, Silver Street and Cleveland Street. Scot Lane leads off the north-east side, and Priory Place and Priory Walk lead off the south-west side.

Listed buildings on the north-east side of the street include the former Midland Bank, built in 1897; Barclays Bank, completed in 1882; the 17th-century 4, 5 and 6 High Street; NatWest Bank, built in 1925; the Yorkshire Bank, built in 1841; the early-19th century 17 High Street, 18 High Street, and 19 and 20 High Street; 22 High Street, built as public meeting rooms and now a shop; 23 High Street, built around 1800; the late-18th century 24 and 24B High Street; and 25 High Street, also built around 1800.

On the south-west side of the street lie Lloyds Bank, built in 1912; the early-19th century 52 High Street; the mid-18th century 50 and 51 High Street; the former TSB Bank, built about 1920; the Grade I listed Doncaster Mansion House, completed in 1748; the mid-18th century 44 High Street; 43 High Street, originally built as gambling rooms in 1826; the early-19th century 42 High Street; late 18th-century 41 High Street; and the Westminster Building, completed in 1780. Although unlisted, the Danum Hotel, built in 1908, is another prominent building.
