= Baxter Gate =

Street in Doncaster, South Yorkshire, England

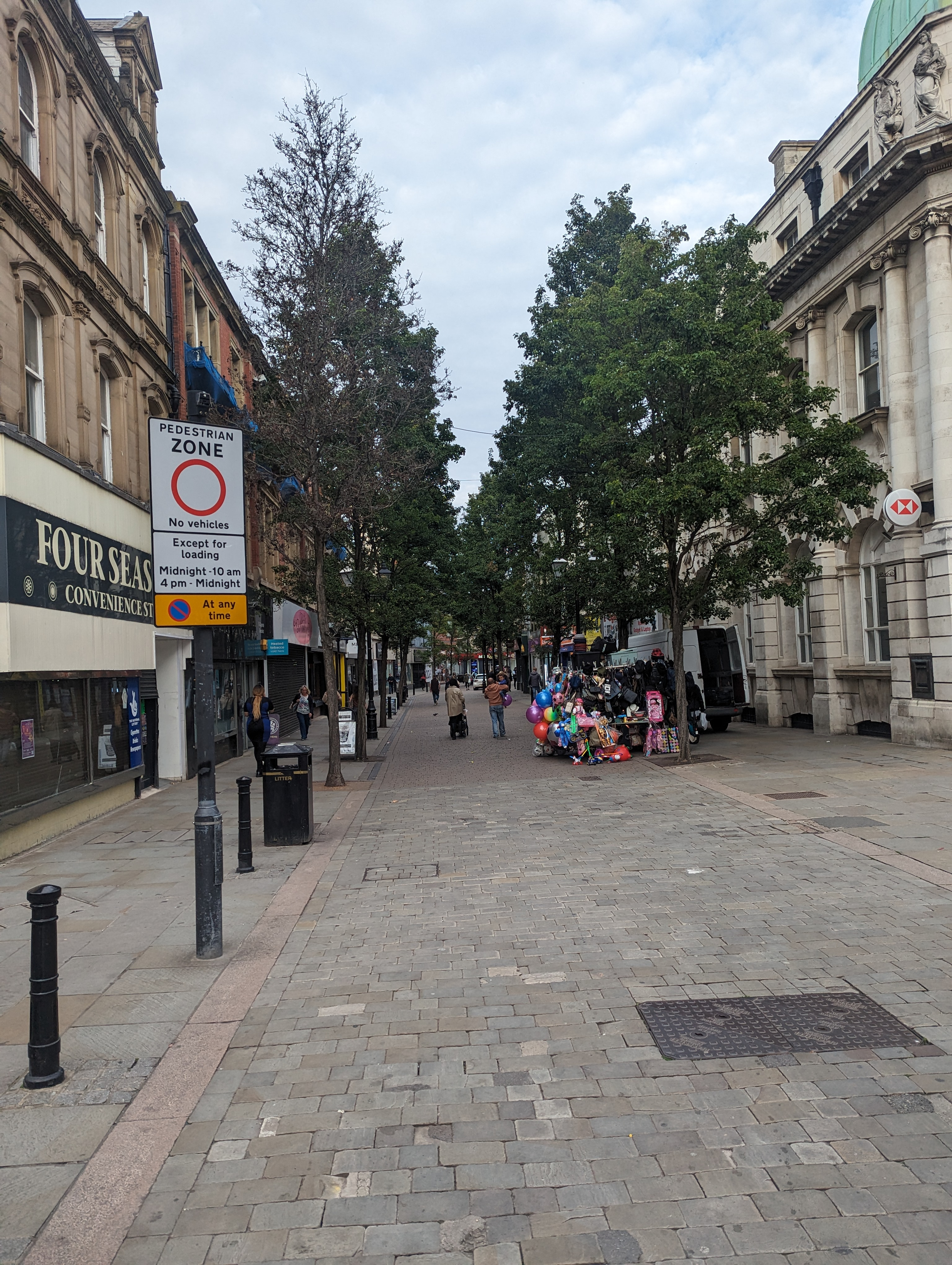
View north-east up Baxter Gate, in 2023

Baxter Gate is a pedestrianised street in the city centre of Doncaster, in South Yorkshire, England.

== History ==
The street lay outside the Roman fort of Danum, and along the defences of the Saxon burh. It emerged in the Roman era, connecting the fort to the alternative route of Ermine Street. It was built up in the 12th-century, and retained importance as the road connecting Doncaster Market to the Great North Road. In 1350, it was recorded as "vicus pistorum", the street of bakers, which later evolved into "Baxter Gate". The road was widened around 1900.

Doncaster Metropolitan Borough Council describes the street as one of the two main shopping streets in the town, "to a lesser degree [than St Sepulchre Gate], although it is still populated by some well-known national retailers", and that it has "a lively mix of building styles and retailers".

== Layout and architecture ==
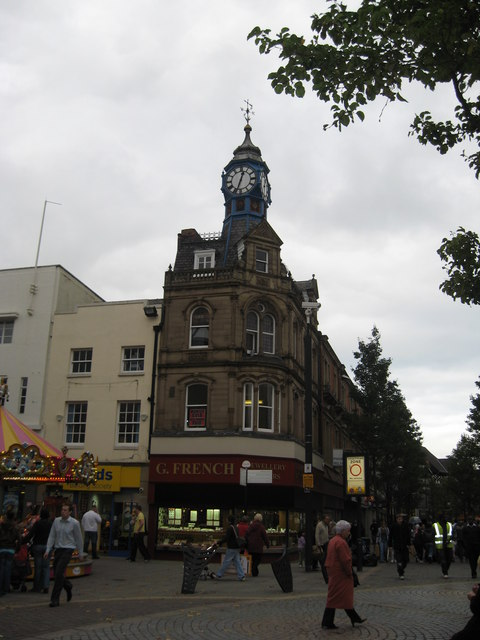
Clock Tower and the view up Baxter Gate

The street runs north-east, from the junction of High Street, St Sepulchre Gate and French Gate, to Market Place. St George Gate leads off its north-west side.

The most notable building on the north-west side of the street is Clock Corner at 1 Baxter Gate, a shop with an octagonal clock tower. On the south-east side is 24 and 25 Baxter Gate, built in 1754.
