= Hall Gate =

Street in Doncaster, South Yorkshire, England

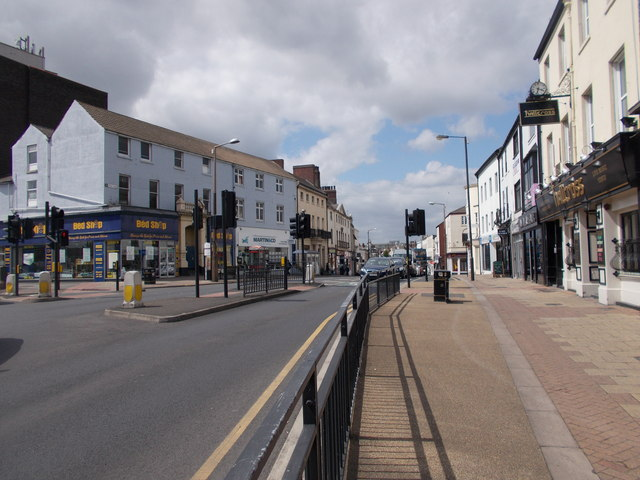
View along Hall Gate, from South Parade

Hall Gate is a street in the town centre of Doncaster, in South Yorkshire, England.

== History ==
The street originated as the alternative route of Ermine Street, passing by the fort of Danum. When new fortifications were built in the 12th century, Hall Gate formed the section of the street leading south-east away from the town, with one of four stone gates at the town end of the road. It rises about 5 meters from north-west to south-east, forming a gentle hill. Tilli's Cross was erected at the south-east end of the street, probably in the 12th century. In 1793, the brow of the hill was lowered, and the cross was demolished, with a replica built on a site further south-east, along South Parade.

The street formed part of the Great North Road, and then the A1 road, until the A1(M) motorway was constructed as a by-pass. It continues the route of the town's High Street, and maintains the same width, and although it lacks any grand civic or commercial buildings, it does retain several Georgian houses. Doncaster Metropolitan Borough Council describes the street as a "secondary retail area" with a "down at heel" appearance, this often being ascribed to the Frenchgate Shopping Centre taking business away from less central areas of the town. In 2020, the council made the street one-way, in an attempt to make it more pedestrian-friendly.

== Layout and architecture ==
The street runs south-east, from the junction of High Street, Cleveland Street and Silver Street, to the junction of South Parade, Thorne Road and Waterdale. Prince's Street and Lazarus Court lead off its north-east side, and a footpath to Wood Street leads off its south-west side.

Notable buildings on the north east side of the street include the early-19th century 5, and 7 and 7A Hall Gate; mid-19th century 6 Hall Gate; late-18th century 8, and 9 Hall Gate; 18 Hall Gate, built about 1790; the Hall Gate United Reformed Church, built in 1804; and the early-19th century 26, and 27 Hall Gate;

On the south-west side of the street are the early-19th century 53 and 54, 52, and 51 Hall Gate; 50 Hall Gate, built about 1800; the late-18th century 40, 41 and 41A Hall Gate; and the mid-18th century Georgian House.
