= Co-operative Retail Services =

Former consumer co-operative in the UK

Co-operative Retail Services Limited
- Type: Consumer co-operative
- Industry: Retail and wholesale
- Predecessor: Co-operative Wholesale Society
- Founded: 1957; 69 years ago (1933; 93 years ago as CWS Retail)
- Defunct: 2000; 26 years ago
- Successor: The Co-operative Group
- Headquarters: Rochdale, United Kingdom

Co-operative Retail Services (CRS, originally CWS Retail) was the second-largest consumer co-operative society in the United Kingdom. In 2000, it was dissolved by its members, merging with the larger Co-operative Wholesale Society, to form the Co-operative Group (CWS) Ltd.

== History ==

In 1933, CWS formed a retail division tasked with taking over failing retail consumer co-operatives, and setting up shop in new areas. This division was demerged to form Co-operative Retail Services during 1957. The demerger was prompted by complications with CWS's democratic governance: it was becoming a larger retailer in its own right but it was a secondary co-operative, owned by other co-operatives, meaning the retail division's customers had little representation on the board. However elections were still held with rival political groups standing, such as the 1960 Committee which attempted to give a more left-wing leadership to the London Region of CRS.

CRS expanded and opened up new co-op shops in the "co-op deserts" of the south-east and south-west of England where co-operative activity had historically been low. The CRS was also charged with rescuing failing societies and from the 1950s it began to acquire an increasing number of loss-making co-ops, to the point where the CRS itself began to become loss-making. At which point the Co-operative Wholesale Society began to become the default rescuer of failing co-ops after it had itself absorbed the Scottish Co-operative Wholesale Society, which brought the CWS back to operating its own retail division, in 1973.

During the mid-1990s, CRS began an ambitious investment programme. The society saw the CWS-led Co-op brand as old and out-dated and began a huge refurbishment programme of its ageing and neglected stores under a new 'Co-operative' identity. Slow to adopt the commonplace EPoS systems for its tills, and still pricing products individually rather than using barcode scanners, it also invested in information technology.

In 2000, these changes and improvements were overtaken by events, as CRS was merged back into CWS to form The Co-operative Group. Over the following few years, the re-branding efforts were temporarily reversed as stores and own brand goods were converted into CWS-designed formats – which included the 1993 version of the 1968 CWS four leaf clover "Co-op" logo. However, in 2005, the movement's re-branding programme reintroduced the name Co-operative to these stores. In 2016, however, The Co-operative Group reverted to a version of the 1968 logo.

== Trading operations ==
=== Food ===
The largest proportion of the business (93% of all sales) was devoted to food retailing in over 500 stores. The society had a wide range of stores including superstores (15,000sq ft+), medium-sized supermarkets (5,000-15,000 sq ft) and small convenience stores (<5,000 sq ft). At the end of the 1990s, superstores and supermarkets were branded 'Co-operative Pioneer' (a nod to the movement's heritage of the Rochdale Pioneers) while most smaller convenience stores would carry the 'Co-operative Local' brand. Previously, CRS had used a variety of brands, including Leo's, Market Fresh and Stop & Shop.

==== Food buying group ====
In the 1990s, CRS led a grocery buying group, the Consortium of Independent Co-operatives (CIC) which was independent of the CWS-led Co-operative Retail Trading Group (CRTG). Several of the larger regional co-operatives of the time were members: Portsea, Scotmid, United, and Yorkshire. In 1998, the CIC supplied £1 billion of goods annually, and the CRTG £2.5 billion. The collapse of CIC, in 1998, coincided with the retirement of CRS chief executive Harry Moore, who had opposed proposals to merge CRS with the CWS.

=== Non-food ===
The society operated a number of department stores based in town and city centres. Most of these stores ultimately carried the 'Living' brand. Department stores were located in: Bangor, Barnsley, Barnstaple, Basildon, Bath, Birkenhead, Blackwood, Boscombe, Bridgend, Bristol (Fairfax House) Burnley (previously known as Pendle House), Bury St. Edmunds, Cambridge, Cardiff, Chippenham, Colwyn Bay, Crawley, Doncaster (Danum House), Halifax, Hammersmith, Hemel Hempstead, Hereford, Herne Bay, Huddersfield, Leeds, Leigh, Letchworth, Llandudno, Llanelli, Merthyr Tydfil, Nelson (previously known as Quality House), Newmarket, Pembroke Dock, Pontefract, Reading, Romford, Scunthorpe, St Austell, Stevenage, Stratford, Swansea, Taunton, Trowbridge, Wells, Weston-super-Mare (previously known as Fairfax House), Weymouth, Worcester, Wrexham, Yeovil.

Larger, out-of-town stores carrying a larger range of lines - but no clothing or cosmetics - carried the 'Co-operative HomeWorld' brand. These stores were located in: Carn Brea, Catcliffe, Coventry, Exeter, Filton, Bristol, Hedge End, Rochdale, Talbot Green and Merthyr Tydfil- Leo's Home Centre

In April 1999, CRS announced the closure of all its fifty non-food department stores. Ten of these were Homeworld stores, which were sold to Kingfisher to be converted as B&Q or their then-new Big W out-of-town chain.

=== Rental and credit operations ===
In conjunction with Household and Electrical departments, the operation also ran its own credit finance facility, and rental operation. Rentals included televisions and fridges (gas and electric).

=== Car dealerships ===
The society operated ten car dealerships with 835 staff in the Cambridge area under the Herbert Robinson name. Herbert Robinson had been a business of the former Cambridge & District Co-operative Society, that transferred engagements to CRS in 1991. In 2000, these sites were absorbed into CWS's much larger Priory Motor Group, which at the time had 18 dealerships on 12 sites. Priory was broken up and sold by the Co-operative Group in 2005.

== See also ==
- Co-operative
- The Co-operative brand
- The Co-operative Group
- British co-operative movement
