= Doncaster Market =

Market in Doncaster, South Yorkshire, England

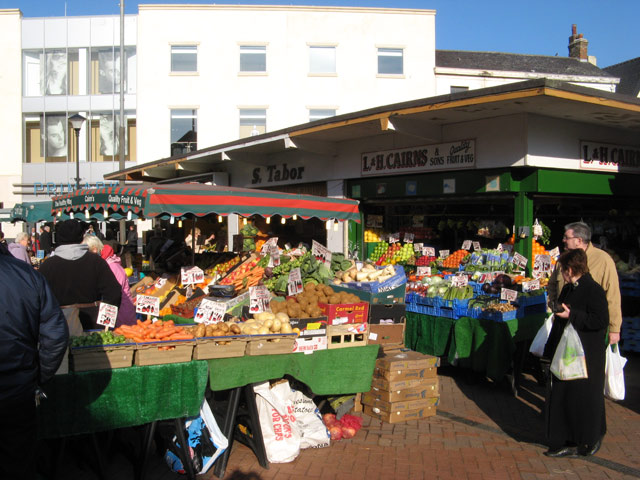
Outdoor stalls in the marketplace, in 2010

Doncaster Market lies in the centre of the city of Doncaster, in South Yorkshire, England.

== Early history ==
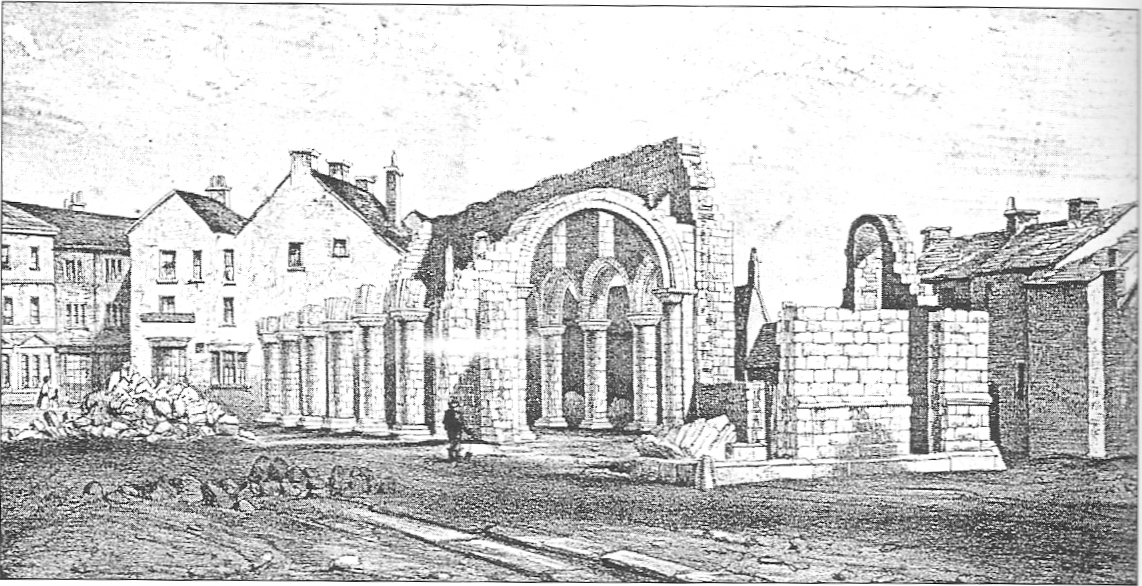
St Mary Magdalene, in the marketplace, on demolition in 1846

The market was first chartered in 1248, and was held in and around the church of St Mary Magdalene. It expanded to cover a triangular square, north of the church, on the edge of the then-built-up area. The church was deconsecrated in 1548, and buildings gradually encroached on its churchyard. In 1756, a Butchers' Shambles and butter cross were constructed to the west of the former church, followed in 1778 by a New Shambles. In the 1780s, cattle sales in the market were gathered together, in Parsonage Yard.

== The Market Hall ==
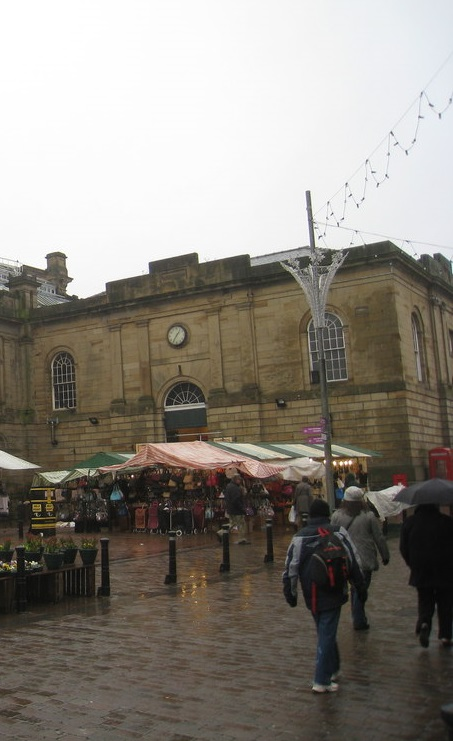
The Market hall designed by John Butterfield

In 1845, most of the market buildings were demolished, including the former church. A new market hall was constructed in the middle of the cleared area. The new building was designed by John Butterfield, and was two storeys high, with a U-shaped plan. In 1870, more buildings were cleared, to permit the construction of the Doncaster Corn Exchange to infill the "U", and project to the front. The corn exchange was designed by William Watkins and is five bays wide, with red sandstone columns, and a large lunette window.

== Wool Market ==
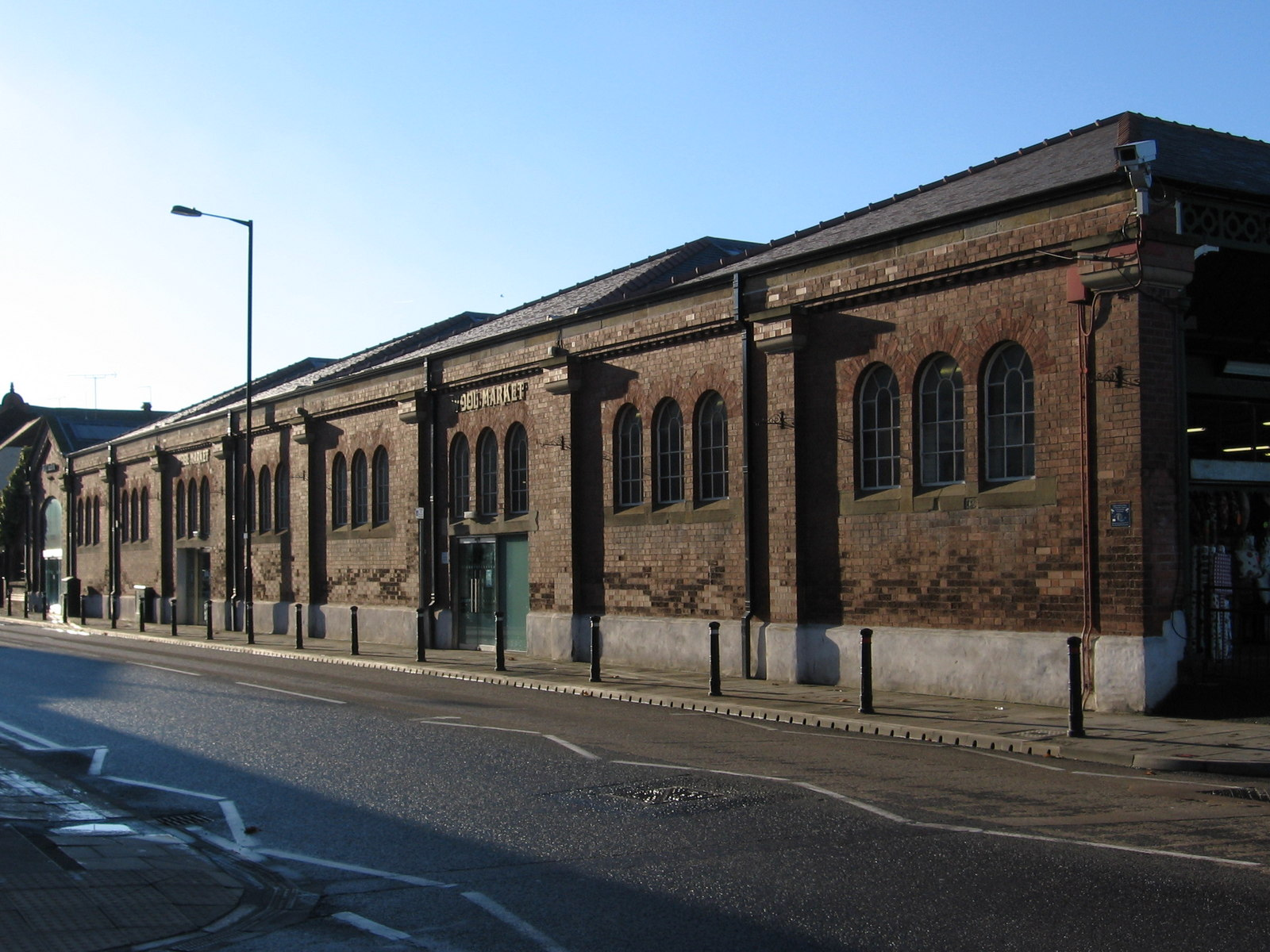
East front of the Wool Market

John Butterfield also designed a woollen market, on the north-east side of the marketplace. It is a 9-by-7 bay hall, constructed of brick and iron, with stalls arranged in four arcades. It was completed in 1863, and renovated in the 20th-century with replacement doors and glazing. It was restored in 2019, to house both stalls selling goods, and food stalls. During renovations, a Mediaeval well was discovered under the floor, which is now visible under glass.

== Later history ==
In 1900, an underground cold store and public weighbridge were added to the market, and in 1908, the cattle market was extended, with an octagonal auction ring added.

A single storey fish market was added to the rear of the original market hall in 1930. The complex was grade II* listed in 1950.

In 1971, a plan proposed the relocation of the market, but this was not carried out. Instead, the marketplace was made a conservation area in 1974. The conservation area identified included the variety of two- and three-storey buildings surrounding the marketplace, including 18th- and 19th-century coaching inns, and 20th-century shops.

In 1994, there was a major fire in the complex, following which it was restored. The restoration revealed the Mediaeval cemetery and some Roman pottery. By 2007, the northern end of the marketplace was used as a car park. At the time, Doncaster Metropolitan Borough Council stated that "the market offers a wide range of goods, lively atmosphere and still draws the community into the market place. This is despite a local perception that the market is in decline". At the time, the main market days were Tuesday, Friday and Saturday.
