= Co-op Food =

British brand of consumer co-operative supermarkets

Co-operative Group Limited (Food)
- Logo used since 2016

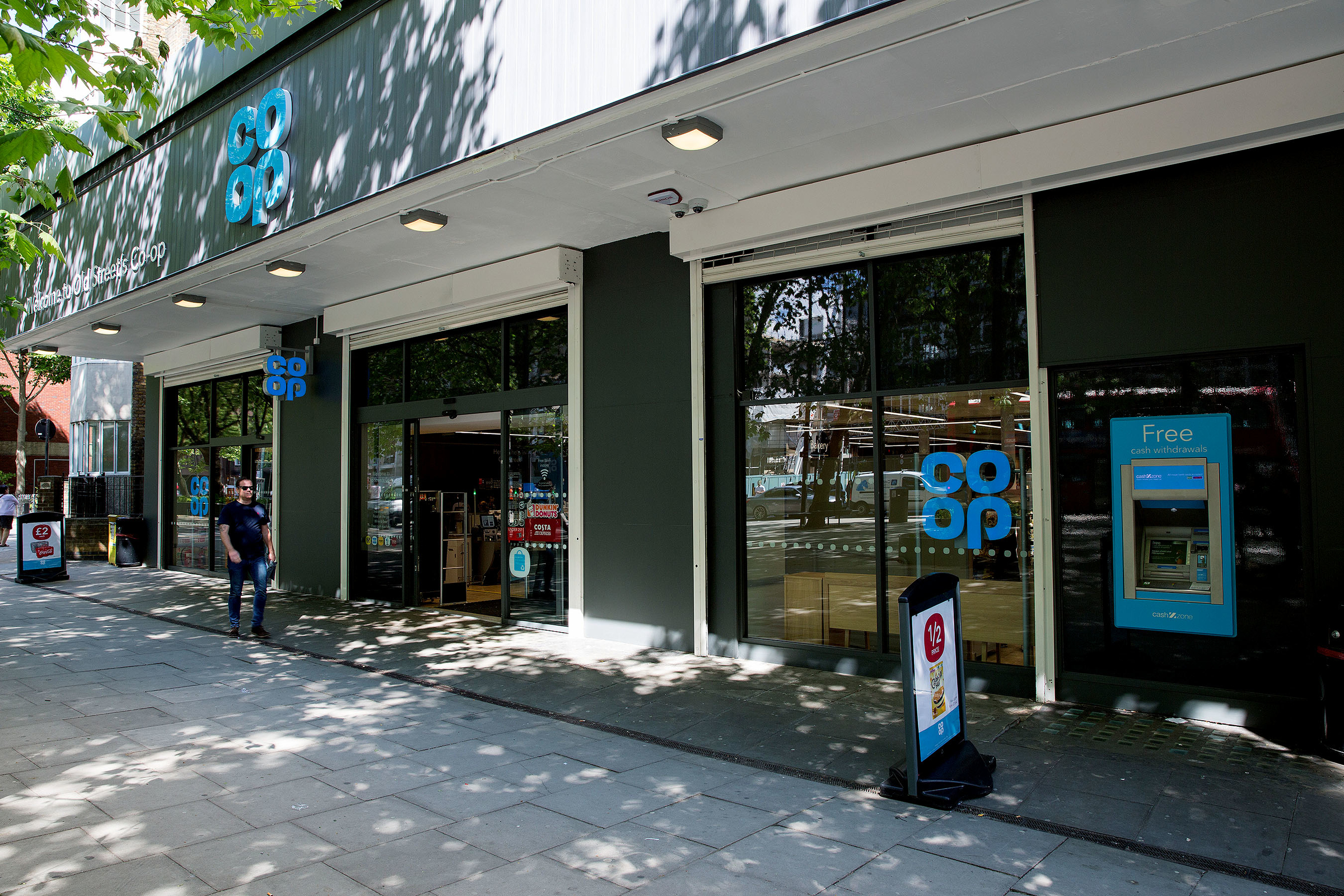
- A rebranded Co-op Food shop in Old Street, London, pictured in 2016
- Trade name: Co-op
- Type: Groceries retailer
- Founded: 23 July 1850
- Headquarters: Manchester, United Kingdom
- Number of locations: 2,927 (2024)
- Revenue: ▲£7.8 billion (2022)
- Net income: ▼£139 million (2022)
- Owner: The Co-operative Group
- Website: Official website

Co-op is a UK supermarket chain and the brand used for the food retail business of one of the world's largest consumer co-operatives, The Co-operative Group, that developed over the years from its oldest subscribing member society, the Rochdale Society of Equitable Pioneers, established in 1844. As the UK's seventh largest food retailer, Co-op operates nearly 2,400 food stores. It also supplies products to over 6,000 other stores, including those run by independent co-operative societies, through its wholesale business, Co-op Wholesale.

Co-op is a mutual and employs 56,000 people, with an annual turnover of more than £11 billion. The organisation is known for its involvement in social and community programmes.

Although Co-op formerly operated several larger supermarkets, the vast majority of their sites today are small or medium sized stores.

== Operations ==
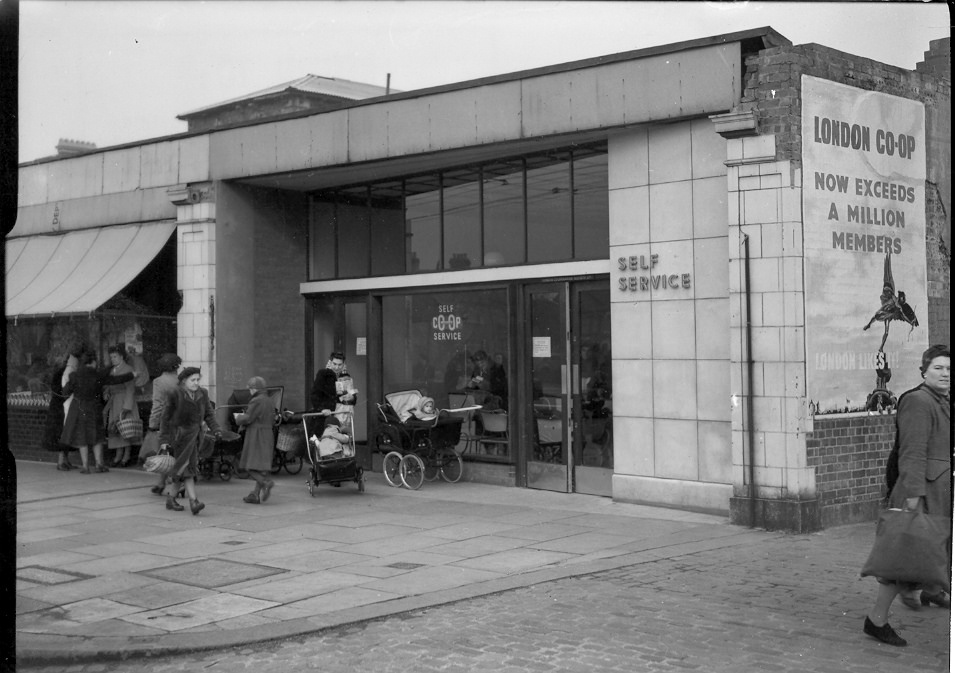
Co-op self-service grocers in London ca 1950.

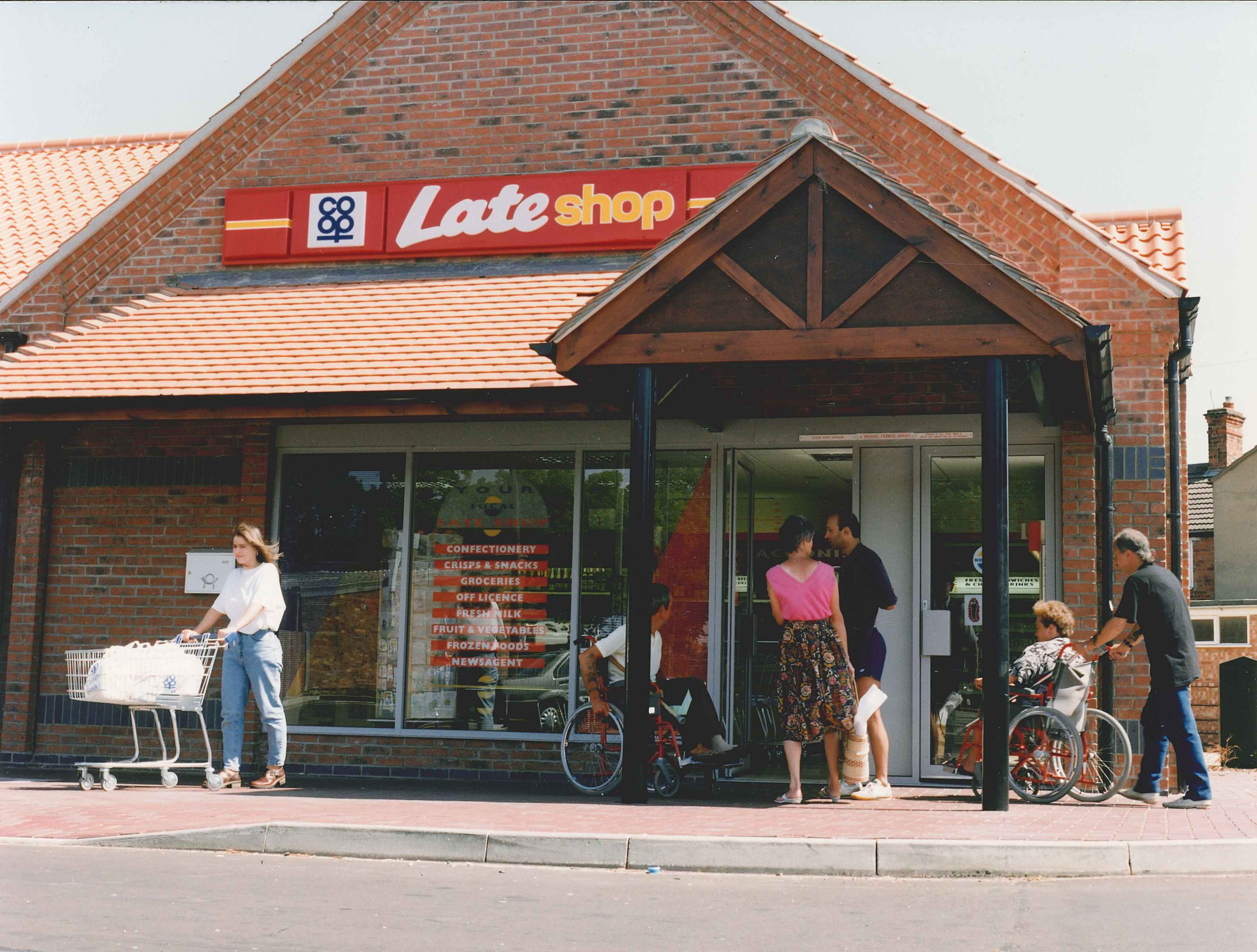
Co-op supermarket in Kirton, Lincolnshire in 1995.

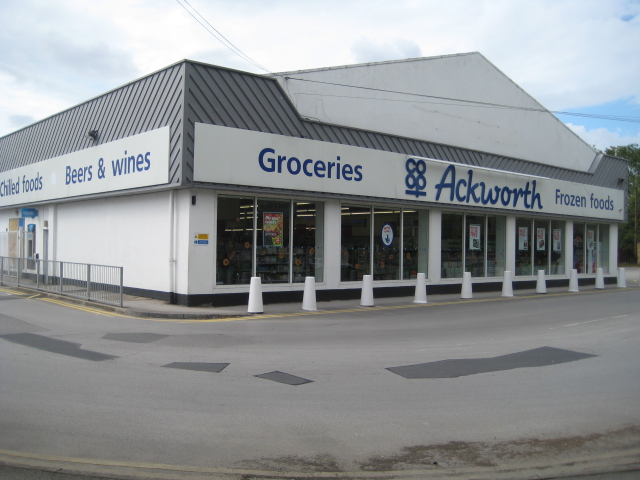
Co-op supermarket in Ackworth, West Yorkshire in 1990s–2000s branding.

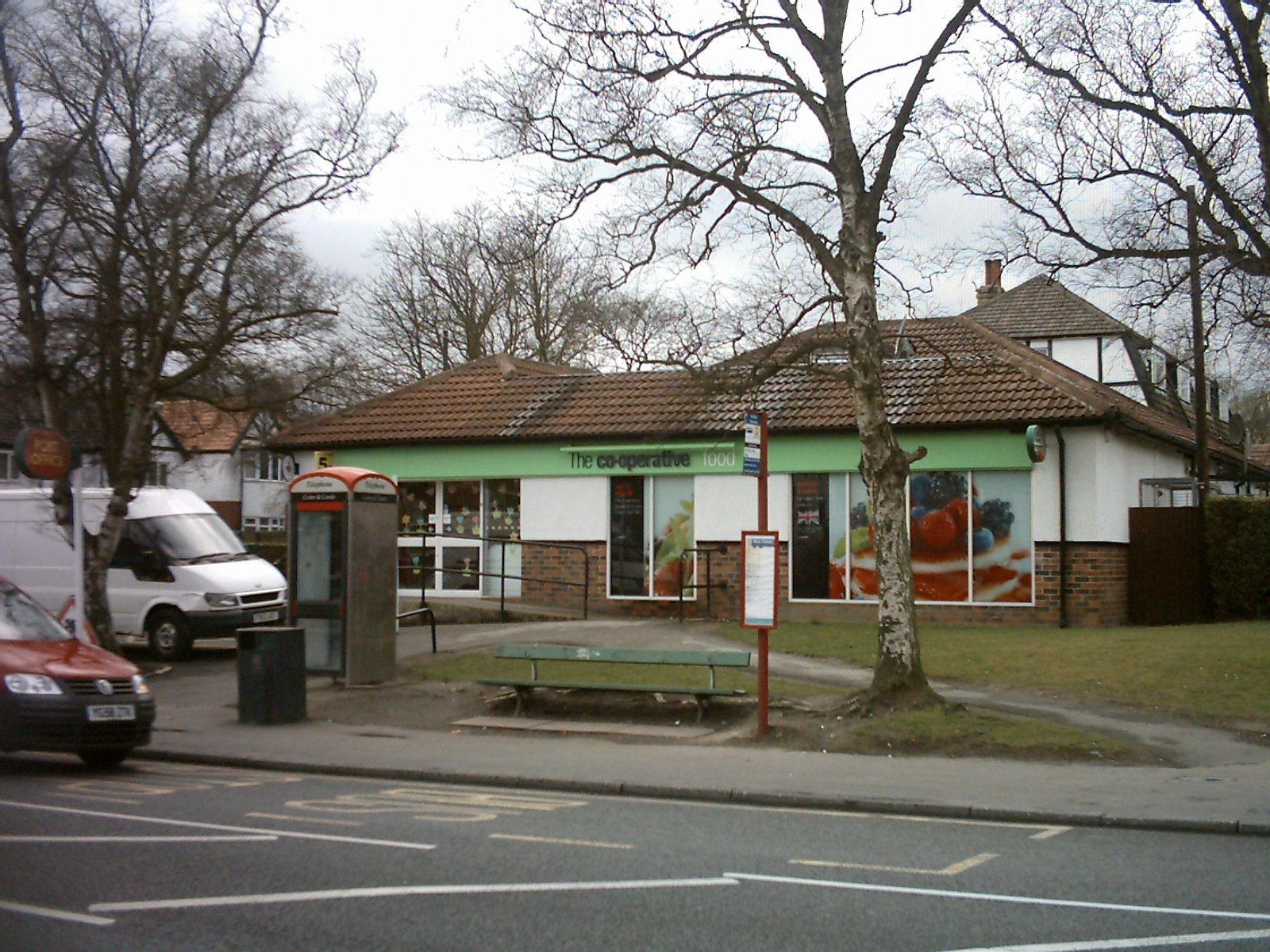
A Co-operative Food shop in Lawnswood, Leeds with pre 2016 branding.

The "Co-op" brand is used by over 3,500 shops owned by various societies which make up the co-operative movement, including the Central England Co-operative. A number of co-operative societies including the Lincolnshire Co-operative prefer to use the 1992 'cloverleaf version' of The Co-operative brand. In May 2016, The Co-operative Group reverted to the use of its 1968 Co-op cloverleaf branding.

In March 2009, The Co-operative Group acquired the Somerfield supermarket retailer for £1.57 billion from a group of private equity investors. The Somerfield Head Office in Bristol was subsequently closed and the grocery stores were either sold to rivals or integrated into its own Co-op Food division. In 2016, The Co-operative Group sold 298 smaller convenience stores to McColl's.

The majority of products sold in "Co-op Food" shops are sourced collectively through Federal Retail Trading Services although stocking decisions and pricing are determined by the individual businesses.

=== List of UK Co-operatives with food retail operations ===
Though often considered to be one supermarket business, The Co-operative Food is a network of supermarkets and convenience shops owned and operated by over 15 independent co-operative societies, many of which have adopted the 2008 version of The Co-operative brand. In total there are over 4,000 co-operative food shops in the UK. The table below indicates how many food shops each co-operative society operates.

Co-operative Society	Number of Outlets	Version of The Co-operative brand
The Co-operative Group	2,774	2016 cloverleaf
Central England Co-operative	261	ICA logo
The Midcounties Co-operative	234	ICA logo
Southern Co-operative	213	own version
Scotmid	206	ICA logo
East of England Co-operative Society	132	own version
Lincolnshire Co-operative	93	1993 cloverleaf
Chelmsford Star Co-operative	42	ICA logo
Heart of England Co-operative	33	2008 version
Channel Islands Co-operative Society	26	ICA logo
Radstock Co-operative Society	16	own version
Tamworth Co-operative Society	12	2008 version
Clydebank Co-operative Society	6	1993 cloverleaf
Allendale Co-operative Society	1	own version
Coniston Co-op	1	own version / 1993 cloverleaf
Grosmont Co-operative Society	1	own version

=== Work with Amazon ===
In 2021, the Co-op started selling food online through Amazon. The move was criticised by the GMB trade union, which has been campaigning for improved worker rights at Amazon.

=== Distribution ===
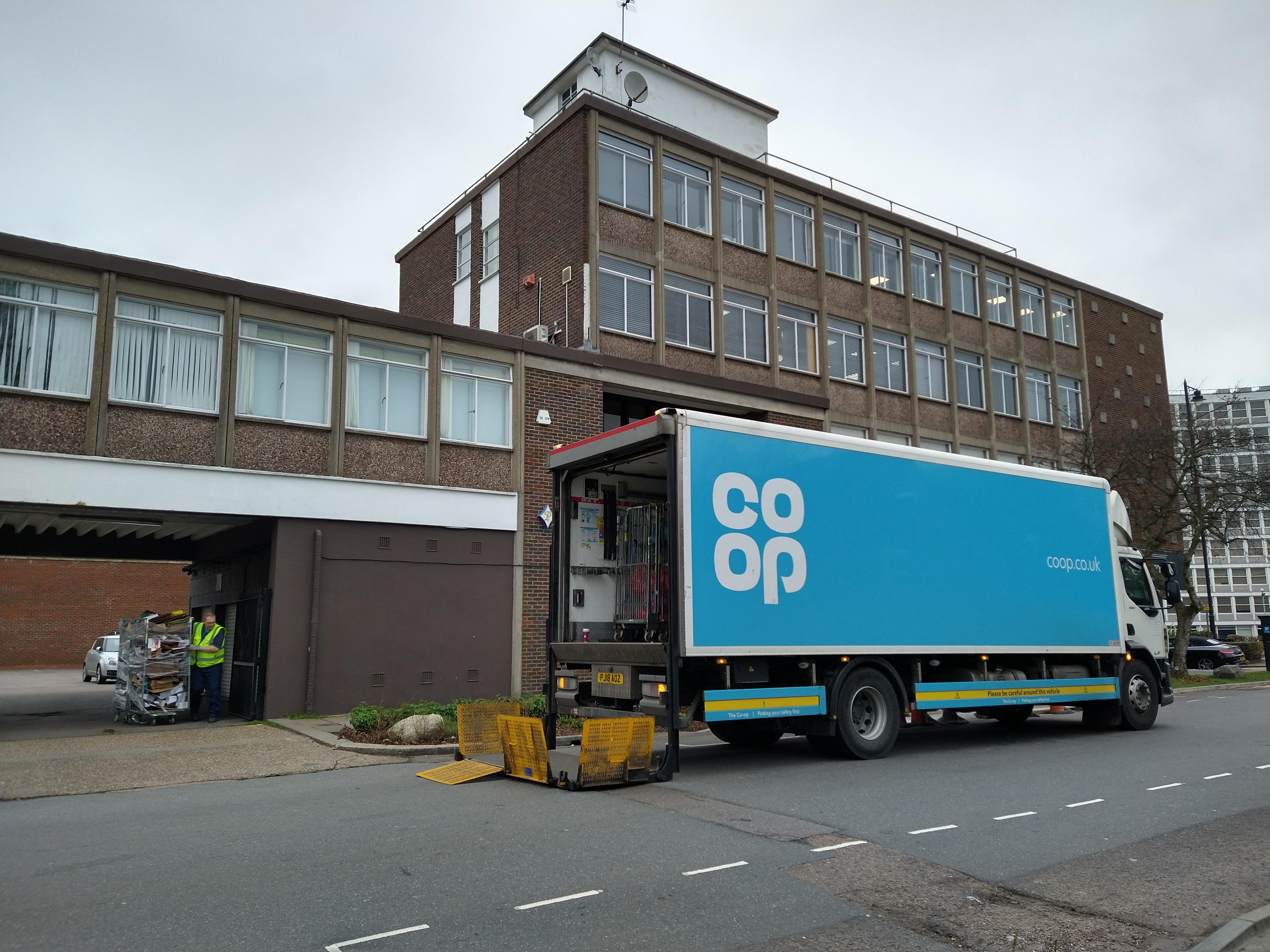
A Co-op food truck outside a store in Cockfosters

Co-op Supply Chain Logistics is the distribution business of The Co-operative Group that manages the national and international distribution of goods on behalf of all the food retailing co-operative societies who are members of Co-operative Federal Retail Trading Services. The Co-operative Group manages all of its own warehouses and most of its own transport operations, although several distribution centres use third party logistics partners to manage their transport operations. Supply Chain Logistics Head Office is co-located at the Birtley Distribution Centre.

Co-op Supply Chain Logistics has 9 regional distribution centres (RDCs) and 3 smaller local service centres (LSCs) servicing the outer extremities of the UK. The Coventry-based National Distribution Centre (NDC) supplies all distribution centres with slower moving ambient lines and tobacco.

Depot Name	Location	Products	Transport Operation
Birtley RDC	Birtley, County Durham	Ambient, Frozen (picked in Newhouse), Chilled, Meat and Produce	Co-op SCL
Andover RDC & Frozen Hub	Andover, Hampshire	Ambient, Frozen, Chilled, Meat and Produce	GXO Logistics
Avonmouth RDC	Avonmouth, Bristol	Ambient, Frozen (picked in Andover), Chilled, Meat and Produce	GXO Logistics
Castlewood RDC	Mansfield, Nottinghamshire	Ambient, Frozen (picked in Lea Green), Chilled, Meat and Produce	Co-op SCL
Lea Green RDC & Frozen Hub	St Helens, Merseyside	Ambient, Frozen, Chilled, Meat and Produce	GXO Logistics
Newhouse RDC & Frozen Hub	Lanarkshire, Scotland	Ambient, Frozen, Chilled, Meat and Produce	Co-op SCL
Thurrock RDC	West Thurrock, Essex	Ambient, Frozen (picked in Biggleswade), Chilled, Meat and Produce	Co-op SCL
Biggleswade RDC & Frozen Hub	Biggleswade, Bedfordshire	Ambient, Frozen, Chilled, Meat and Produce	Co-op SCL
Coventry NDC	Coventry, West Midlands	Slow Moving Ambient and Tobacco	Eddie Stobart
Dalcross LSC	Inverness, Scotland	Local service centre for Northern Scotland	Co-op SCL
Carrickfergus LSC	County Antrim, Northern Ireland	Local service centre for Northern Ireland	Co-op SCL
Plymouth LSC	Plymouth, Devon	Local service centre for South Western England	Co-op SCL
Wellingborough RDC	Wellingborough, Northamptonshire	Ambient, Frozen (picked in Biggleswade), Chilled, Meat and Produce	Wincanton

== Membership ==
Members of The Co-operative Group and participating regional societies earn one membership point for every £1 spent at The Co-operative Food. Points are converted into dividend at a rate agreed annually by the Board.

In September 2016, The Co-operative Group launched a new membership, decreasing the amount members earn from 5% to 2%, and increasing the amount spent on charity from 1% to 2%.

In July 2024, The Co-operative rebranded their slogan to "Owned By You. Right By You", placing greater emphasis on member ownership.

== Product ranges ==
Co-op Food ranges currently are (as of September 2023):

- Co-op – standard own brand range
- Irresistible – premium food and drink
- Free From – suitable for customers with food allergies
- Gro – Plant-based own brand range
- Honest Value – Low price range (launched in November 2020)

Co-op Food ranges formerly were:

- Loved By Us – standard own brand range
- Truly Irresistible – premium food and drink
- Home Baking – home baking range
- Simply Value – low price range

== Animal welfare ==
The Co-op has faced ongoing media scrutiny over animal welfare issues in its supply chain. In 2021, undercover footage from a salmon supplier revealed fish being improperly stunned, leading to many being killed while still conscious. Later that year, an investigation into chicken farms supplying the Co-op documented birds dying of thirst, carcasses left among the living, and overcrowded sheds where cannibalism and ammonia burns were reported.

In 2022, footage from a duck farm producing eggs for the Co-op showed workers swinging ducks by their necks and disposing of dead animals in bins. A December 2023 report from a farm supplying the Co-op and other British retailers showed workers swinging ducks by their necks and slamming them into drawers.

In 2023, undercover footage at a Lincolnshire Co-op supplier showed chickens being crushed to death, with some birds suffering severe injuries including broken legs. In August 2023, chickens at multiple farms supplying the Co-op were reported to be collapsing from heat stress, struggling to breathe, and living in unsanitary conditions where they were left lying in their own waste. A BBC report in February 2024 found that 37% of chickens sold by the Co-op had chemical burns linked to ammonia exposure from waste.

In March 2025, the Co-op announced that it would require all prawns in its supply chain to be electrically stunned prior to slaughter by 2027, following campaigns by animal welfare organizations advocating for improved standards. It also stated that it would stop the use of eyestalk ablation, a practice involving the crushing or removal of the eyestalks of female prawns to stimulate egg production. The decision came after several other UK supermarkets, including Waitrose, Tesco, Marks & Spencer, and Sainsbury's, introduced similar policies on crustacean welfare.

== Delivery robots ==
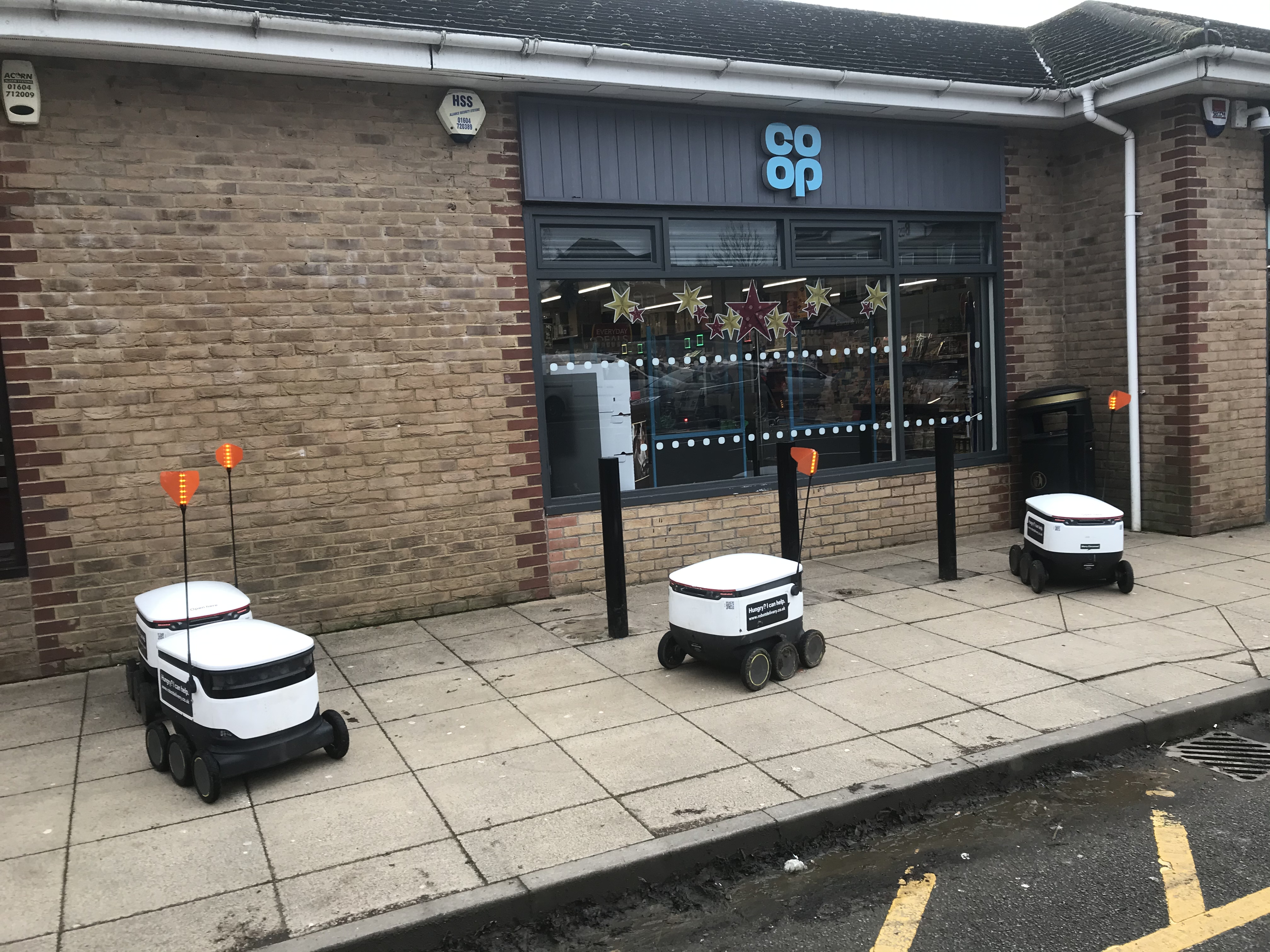
Delivery robots outside a Co-op store

Starting in March 2020 Starship Technologies delivery robots can deliver goods directly to customers from stores in Cambourne, Milton Keynes and Leeds areas of the UK.

== See also ==
- Co-operative Retail Trading Group
- British co-operative movement
