= The Co-operative brand =

UK brand

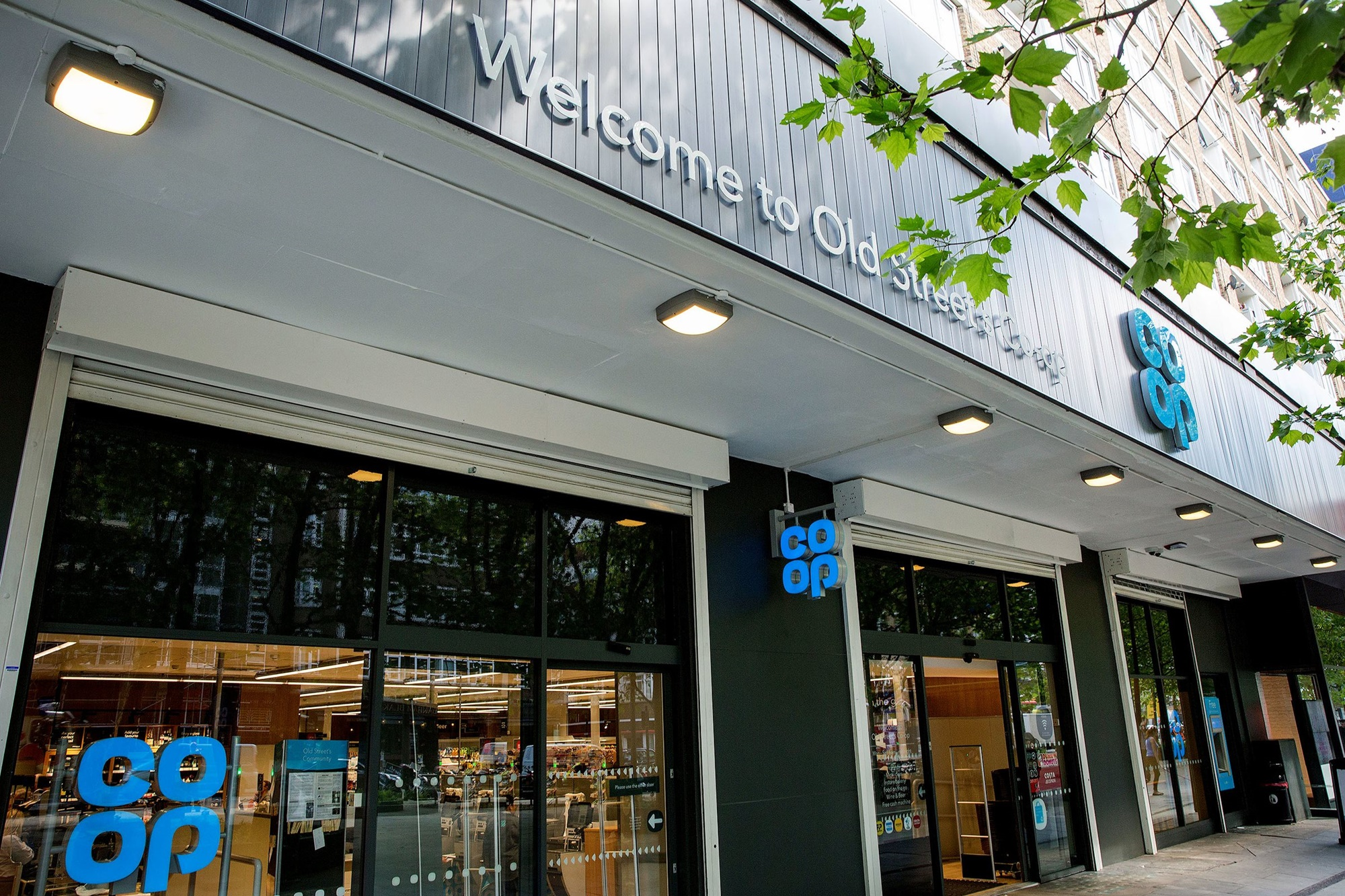
- Branding of a Co-op Food shop
- Product type: Retail branding
- Current owner: The Co-operative Group
- Introduced: 1968, refreshed periodically.
- Markets: United Kingdom
- Website: co-operative.coop

The Co-operative, also known as Co-op, is a brand used by a variety of co-operatives based in the United Kingdom. It is not a single business, but a number of consumers' co-operatives spanning various sectors.

The Co-operative Group is the largest consumer co-operative in the UK and the biggest user of the Co-operative brand in its 4,500 trading outlets. Many independent retail societies in the UK trade as "Co-op". Most co-operative societies have businesses in several areas; however, the largest areas of the businesses are in food shops, particularly convenience shops, thus the largest and most visible use of the branding is as Co-op Food.

The Co-operative brand as it is widely used today came about as a result of the Co-operative Commission's report into the British co-operative movement which recommended that all UK consumers' co-operative societies switch to a universal recognisable co-operative brand. This single brand would be in contrast to the previous array of brands which had existed up to this point including the '1992 cloverleaf', the 'Co-op Welcome' and 'Co-op Late Shop' brands which was understood by the commission to be holding back the public's perception of the co-op sector's modernising approach. Not all of the UK's consumers' co-operative adopted the resultant 2008 and 2016 versions of The Co-operative brand, with the Lincolnshire Co-operative and Scotmid being notable examples.

At The Co-operative Group's 2016 AGM, it was announced that the group would go back to a revitalised version of the 1968 Co-op 'cloverleaf' design, utilising a uniform blue through all business areas.

== History ==
=== Original cloverleaf brand ===
The Co-operative brand
- Original "cloverleaf" design, introduced 1968

Following the success of the Rochdale Pioneers, co-operative shops were established across the UK and took customers away from private traders who responded by making it difficult for co-operatives to source quality goods to sell to their members. The solution was for co-operative retailers to come together in 1863 and form the Co-operative Wholesale Society (CWS) (now the Co-operative Group), which was responsible for sourcing and producing goods for sale in its members' shops, and for unified marketing and branding for the societies. The CWS carried out this role for members for nearly 100 years, and in 1968 launched "Operation Facelift", which resulted in the first national Co-op logo.

=== 1993 refreshed cloverleaf brand ===
The Co-operative brand
- Refreshed "cloverleaf" design, introduced 1993

The movement's cloverleaf logo created the impression that it was a single organisation rather than independent organisations sharing common principles. The brand was strengthened by the creation of the Co-operative Retail Trading Group (CRTG) in 1993, providing Co-op branded products and other food supplies to its members: by 2002, the CRTG provided 100% of food supplies sold by UK consumer co-operatives. Over time, the brand became tarnished by inconsistent customer delivery, and image perceptions of the cloverleaf logo were irreparably damaged. Market research carried out in the early 2000s showed a consistent decline in consumer ratings.

=== 2005–2007 "The Co-operative" re-brand ===
The Co-operative Movement called on then Prime Minister, Tony Blair, to establish a Co-operative Commission to consider ways to ensure the survival of the co-operative business model into the 21st century. The commission, chaired by John Monks, published its conclusions in January 2001 and made recommendations regarding branding. Most important were that a panel representing all sections of the movement should be established to monitor and maintain the positive image of the brand, and that it should consider the "cloverleaf" logo's future.

The Co-operative brand
- Neue Helvetica logotype, introduced 2005

The Co-operative Group's designers and marketers collaborated with Harry Pearce and John McConnell of the designers' co-operative Pentagram to develop a new identity to represent "The Co-operative". The selected artwork was based on a sans serif bold lower case (Neue Helvetica) logotype for the wording, with different colours representing different businesses. It won a silver award from the Design Business Association. The brand was trialled between 2005 and 2007 at several outlets of the Co-operative Group, Scotmid, United Co-operatives and Midcounties Co-operative. A 2007 pilot programme of 115 shops saw sales rise by 15%, beating the 4.6% increase at shops using the 1993 cloverleaf. The brand was introduced to food packaging in 2007, and officially launched in 2008. It was used in national advertising and a national programme of shop refits.

=== 2016 cloverleaf redesign ===
The Co-operative brand
- Revived "cloverleaf" design, introduced 2016

In 2016 the Co-op group reintroduced an updated version of the 1968 logo, phasing out the co-operative logo throughout all their fully owned businesses in favour of the cloverleaf. This transition included refreshing all Co-op branded products within sectors of the group including Food, Funeralcare and Insurance. The roll-out of the refreshed design was announced at the group's 2016 AGM. This coincided with the re-launch of Co-op membership, with a new incentive that allows members to receive 5% off their spending on co-op products and services to spend within the business, with 1% of member spending being given to chosen local charities.

== Uses of The Co-operative brand ==
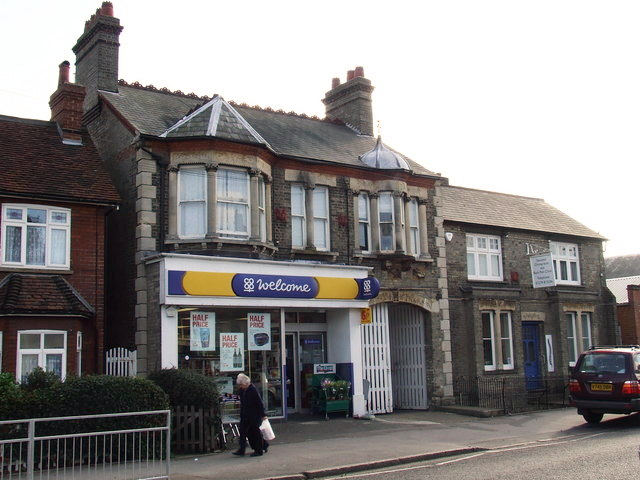
Example of the 'Co-op Welcome' branding in Stansted Mountfitchet

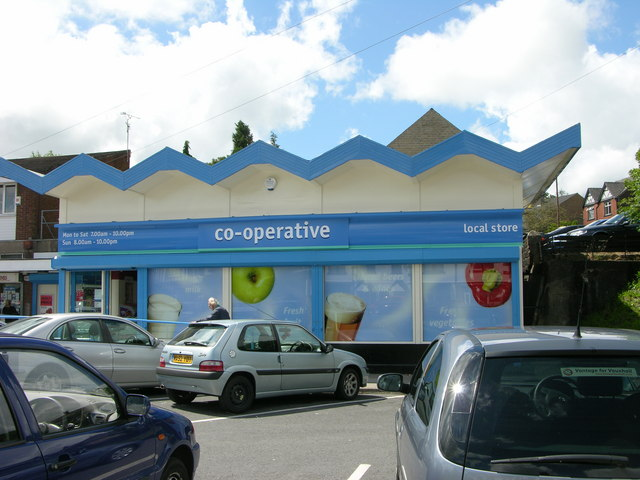
Example of the 'Co-operative' branding in Holcombe, Greater Manchester

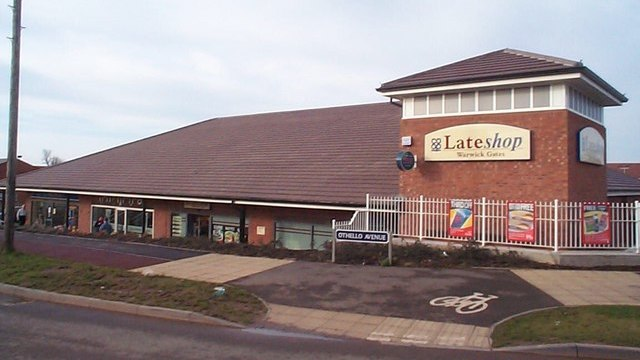
Example of the 'Late Shop' branding on the Co-op shop in Whitnash

Brand	User	Comment
The Co-operative Academies Trust	Academy Trust	Academy Trust operating eight schools in the north of England.
The Co-operative Bank	The Co-operative Bank	Retail banking and commercial banking - now owned by Coventry Building Society, not The Co-operative Group
The Co-operative Childcare	The Midcounties Co-operative	Day child care provision.
The Co-operative Credit Union	The Co-operative Credit Union	Savings accounts and credit for employees and members of UK co-operative businesses.
The Co-operative Electrical	The Co-operative Group; Other retail co-operatives	Online-only electrical retailer of Group, and used by other cooperatives as brand of in-shop electrical departments.
The Co-operative Estates	The Co-operative Group	Real estate division.
The Co-operative Food	Majority of Retail co-operatives	Convenience shops and supermarkets.
The Co-operative Flexible Benefits	The Midcounties Co-operative	Employee benefits.
The Co-operative Florist	Retail co-operatives	Florist.
The Co-operative Funeralcare	Retail co-operatives	Funeral director.
The Co-operative Healthcare	The Midcounties Co-operative	Pharmacies.
The Co-operative Independent Living	The Southern Co-operative	Mobility Aids, Daily Living Aids.
The Co-operative Insurance	The Co-operative Group	Home insurance, Vehicle insurance, Pet insurance.
The Co-operative Legal Services	The Co-operative Group	Family law; will and testament creation and storage.
The Co-operative Party	The Co-operative Party	UK political party representing the interests of the cooperative movement, linked to the Labour Party since 1927.
The Co-operative Travel	Retail co-operatives including Central England Co-operative and Midcounties Co-operative	Travel agent and travel insurance.

After the Co-operative Group's 2016 decision to re-adopt the cloverleaf logo, the Midcounties Co-operative took the decision to switch from the Co-operative Brand to the 'coop' Global Cooperative Marque of the International Co-operative Alliance – both in its ventures such as The Phone Co-op and The Co-operative Energy, and in new store openings such as those in Chipping Norton, Bourton-on-the-Water and Bletchingdon.

== The Co-operative membership ==
Membership is crucial to co-operatives and more than 8 million people are members of co-operatives in the UK which use 'The Co-operative Brand'. Members of co-operatives can be democratically involved in the running of the society, often with votes on key business decisions and for the election of board members. It is also common for members to be provided with a share of the society's annual profits which is proportional to the amount of money that an individual has spent with the society over the year. This share of the profit is commonly referred to as co-op's dividend. The size of the dividend varies depending on the financial performance of the group.

Membership of the majority of consumers' co-operatives in the UK was brought under one identity in 2008 as a part of the launch of 'The Co-operative Brand', but each individual co-operative retains its own individual membership scheme. Members of these societies are given a card has a uniform design and displays the specific co-op which the individual is a member of on the front. As part of their membership schemes, many of the larger co-operatives which have adopted 'The Co-operative' branding will allow members of other co-operatives to earn a share of their profits in a reciprocal agreement. This is particularly the case with those co-ops which have interests in supermarkets, whereas other users of the co-op brand, such as The Phone Co-op, operate entirely independent membership schemes.

Because it facilitates democratic engagement with the co-operative and is also a profit sharing mechanism, The Co-operative membership scheme differs from loyalty cards which many other businesses offer.
