= Oldrids =

Department store chain in Lincolnshire, England

Oldrid & Co., Limited, trading as Downtown is a chain of two retail department stores in Lincolnshire, UK. The business formerly also operated stores under the Oldrids name, until the closure of the last store under that brand in 2022. The first Oldrids store opened in Boston in 1804, and expanded to include stores in Grantham, Scunthorpe, Lincoln and Gainsborough at its peak.

== History ==
The first Oldrids store was opened in Boston, Lincolnshire in 1804 by John Oldrid and Richard Hyde. The store expanded through purchase of neighboring buildings until it encompassed many separate sites, including a furniture store on New Street. The current Oldrids Boston building was constructed in 1970 following the demolition of the former building in 1969.

A move into out-of-town stores followed in the 1980s including the construction of Downtown in Wyberton Fen, on the outskirts of Boston, in 1981 and Downtown Grantham, at Gonerby Moor, in 1989. The Grantham branch was a tie up with Boundary Mill stores, who lease half of the building. A separate Downtown branded garden centre was added to the site in 1998.

=== Expansion ===
Further expansion took place in 2013 when Lincolnshire Co-op decided to exit their department store business, transferring their homestore branches in Lincoln and Gainsborough to Oldrids, although retaining the leaseholds themselves. All staff transferred across as part of the deal and the stores were rebranded Downtown and Oldrids respectively.

In 2016, Central England Co-op sold their Westgate department store in Scunthorpe to Oldrids, who later rebranded it to Downtown in September of that year. The store had previously operated as Upton's and Binns (owned by House of Fraser), with the entrance way to the building still sporting the Binns name in stone to this day. It operated as the chain's outlet centre, with the top floor selling discounted products.

=== Closures ===
In June 2017 it was announced that the Downtown Lincoln store previously purchased from Lincolnshire Co-op would close, with Oldrids citing it as 'loss-making'. The store closed a month later.

Oldrids also announced that they would not be renewing the lease for their Gainsborough department store, leading to its closure in January 2018.

In July 2020, Oldrids announced that their original Boston department store would not reopen following the COVID-19 pandemic in an attempt to ensure the future viability of the business, bringing to an end the use of the Oldrids brand name and their two hundred year history in the town.

In December 2021, it was reported that Oldrids' store in Scunthorpe was to close the following month. The developments surfaced via shop staff informing customers about the closure, with Oldrids declining to officially confirm the reports. The shop duly closed on 29 January 2022.

== Operations ==
As of May 2026, only the out-of-town Downtown stores at Boston and Grantham continue to trade.
