= Anglia Regional Co-operative Society =

Former consumer co-operative in the United Kingdom

Anglia Regional Co-operative Society Limited
- Type: Consumer Co-operative
- Industry: Retail (Wholesale)
- Founded: 1876 (Incorporated 1887)
- Defunct: 2013
- Fate: Merged with Midlands Co-operative Society
- Successor: Central England Co-operative
- Headquarters: Burch House, Saville Road, Peterborough, Cambridgeshire PE3 7PR
- Key people: Harry Whitelock, Chairman; John Chillcott, Chief Executive
- Products: Grocer, Travel Agent, Funeral Director, Ophthalmic Optician
- Revenue: £257 million (2007)
- Number of employees: 3,700 (2006 approx.)
- Website: arcs.co.uk at the Wayback Machine (archived 26 September 2013)

Anglia Regional Co-operative Society Limited was the fifth largest consumer co-operative in the United Kingdom. It was formed by the merger of the Greater Peterborough Regional and Anglia (formerly Waveney) co-operative societies in 1987. The Society had over 80 stores, principally trading in East Anglia. Head office was located at Westgate House, Peterborough until 2011.

The Society was a registered Industrial and Provident Society, a member of the Co-operative Union, the Co-operative Retail Trading Group and a corporate member of The Co-operative Group (formerly Co-operative Wholesale Society), the largest consumer co-operative in the world.

On 19 September 2013, it was announced that the boards of Anglia Co-operative Society and Midlands Co-operative Society had agreed merger terms. Approved by members on 4 and 18 November, legal completion of the merger took place on 1 December, with the Society transferring engagements to Midlands Co-operative. On 15 January 2014, members of the merged society approved a change of name to Central England Co-operative effective from 25 January 2014.

== Trading ==
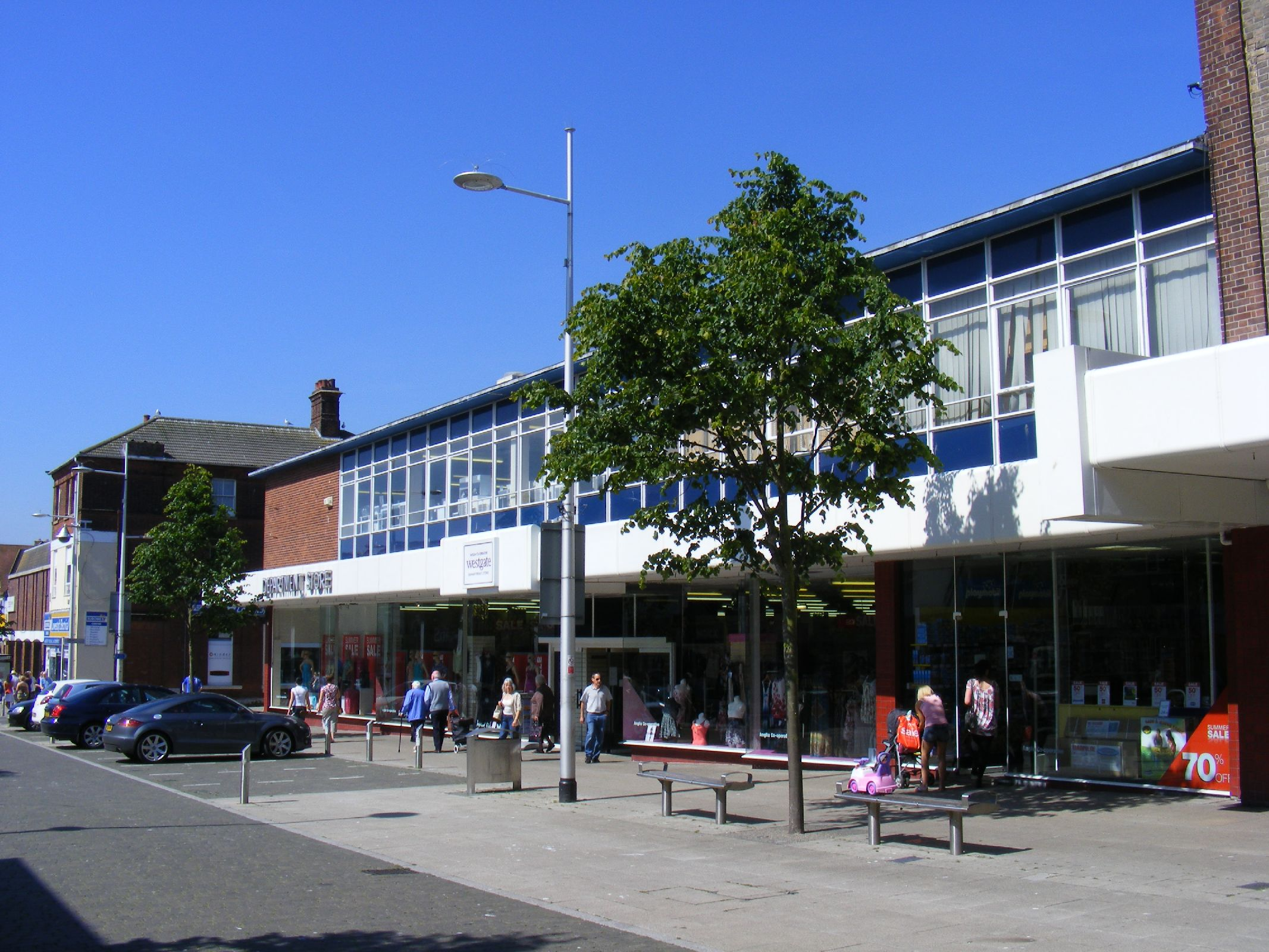
The Anglia Westgate department store in Lowestoft in 2010

Under its rules, "The objects of the Society [were] to carry on the business of a store-keeper, general dealer and universal provider in all its branches, and in particular to buy, sell, manufacture, produce, grow, cultivate and deal in goods, stores, consumable articles, chattels and effects of all kinds, both wholesale and retail and generally to engage in any business, trade or industry which may seem to the Society directly or indirectly conducive to the interests or convenience of the Society's members or any section thereof". In addition, the aims stated, "The Society shall at all times conduct its business and affairs in accordance with the Rochdale Principles of Co-operation, as published from time to time by the International Co-operative Alliance, serving the needs of its customers, employees and the communities in which it trades". In practice, the Society's principal undertakings at the time of merger with the Midlands Society, besides food and fuel retail, comprised the provision of funeral, optical, travel and foreign exchange services. Its previous engagements include department and furniture stores, motor car dealerships, dispensing chemists, dairy and bakery.

=== Expansion ===
In 2004, United Co-operatives, based in the North West of England, announced that it no longer intended to include department stores in its primary strategy, leading to the sale of seven stores, mostly inherited from the Yorkshire Co-operative Society, to the Anglia Society. In 2005, the Co-operative Group also announced its decision to exit the department store sector and, in 2006, a further seven stores, this time located in the South East of England, were transferred to the Anglia Society. The Group subsequently merged with United in 2007. Thus, through acquisition, many Westgate branches were situated further afield than the core Eastern region.

The name was taken from the Society's late nineteenth century headquarters, home of the original Westgate House Department Store on Park Road, Peterborough.

In 2007, the Society—by now the largest in the non-food sector—formed the Anglia Buying Service, making its buying and logistics expertise available to other co-operatives. In 2008, it launched an electronic commerce venture, selling bedroom, living and dining room furniture, with free delivery throughout Great Britain.

=== Divestment ===
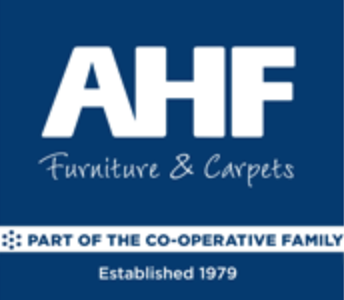
Established as the home furnishings division of the Peterborough Society in 1979, AHF became an independent member of the co-operative family in 2011

In 2011, the business of 19 Westgate Department Stores, including Contact Electrical and Comfortmaker Textile Superstores was divested to J E Beale for £7.5m. Ownership of the freehold properties remained with the Society, which continued to operate AHF furniture and carpets, Co-operative Travel, Westgate Optical and Stylistics hair and beauty concessions; Beales committed to maintain and honour the dividend at these branches, until replaced by their Love Rewards scheme the following year. The Co-operative Home store in Hartlepool and Westgate stores at Blyth, Scunthorpe and March were not included in the sale. The site of the March store was sold to Reef Estates and the premises leased to Boyes, although the Co-operative Travel branch previously based there was unaffected, relocating to its own premises. The Hartlepool store closed when the Society's 10-year lease expired later that year. The Blyth and Scunthorpe stores continued to trade as Westgate for the time being due to devalued freehold and a long running lease, although it was reported that management were "reviewing the format and pursuing any opportunities that give the stores and the staff the best prospects for the future". A buyer was eventually found for the Blyth store, but not as a going concern and it ceased trading in 2013. Central England Co-operative finally disposed of the Scunthorpe store to Oldrids & Co. in 2016.

Later in 2011, AHF Home Furnishings was transferred to Anglia Home Furnishings Holdings as a going concern. A partner of the Society, Anglia Home Furnishings is the largest employee-owned co-operative in the UK. The sale included ARCS Internet, trading as Co-op Furniture, the online store of AHF and Westgate, which was renamed AHF Internet.

== Membership ==
Co-operative societies are owned and controlled by their members on the principle of one member one vote and the Anglia Society operated on that basis, giving all members equal voting rights. Each member was required to hold at least one share of £1 which was paid in full on entering the Society. Organisations were also eligible to join. Agreed by the membership, the Society's rules provided for a board of ten, three of whom may have been employees of the Society, to be elected by the annual general meeting. The full board met monthly and sub-committees met quarterly or less frequently.

Dividend is a share of the profits made by the Society. The rate of dividend was recommended to members by the board of directors and put to a vote. Members had an opportunity at the point of sale to donate their dividend to the Anglia Co-operative Community Fund (Share 600), the proceeds of which were presented each year to three or four charities nominated by the board. It was paid annually and a warrant placed in the share account wallet on receipt.

The Co-operative Group relaunched its own membership scheme in 2006. In 2008, the Anglia Society joined the new scheme under a reciprocal arrangement. The Society began allocating dividend through the card scheme, which members were able to use nationally at participating societies. This included food purchases, on which the Society had not previously paid dividend. A new rule book based on Co-operatives^{UK} 12th edition model rules was approved by the membership and registered with the Financial Services Authority in 2009. The Midlands Society also operated the membership scheme and similar arrangements continue with Central England Co-operative.

Anglia Regional Co-operative Party organise in Peterborough and west Norfolk.

== Subsidiaries ==
In 2008, Rainbow supermarkets and Co-op Local stores began the process of re-branding as The Co-operative Food whilst remaining part of the Anglia Co-operative Society. In 2011, adjacent petrol filling stations, previously supplied by Shell, moved across to Total, aligning buying with the Co-operative Retail Trading Group. The Co-operative Travel at Anglia Co-operative Society was a trading name of the Freedom Travel Group which, in 2012, became part of the Thomas Cook Group.

Division	Outlets
The Co-operative Food	27 (including 8 filling stations)
The Co-operative Travel	15 (plus 10 bureaux de change)
Anglia Co-operative Funerals	25
Westgate Department Stores	23
Westgate Opticians	Peterborough, St. Neots and Hunstanton
Stylistics Hair and Beauty Salon	Peterborough

The Anglia Co-operative Funeral group incorporates R J Scholes (Bourne, Deeping St. James and Stamford), Harvey Brothers (Bungay), J H Landin & Son (Chatteris), A Coley & Son (Crowland), George James & Son (March), Watkins & Stafford (Peterborough), Dennis Easton (St. Ives), Fishers (Southwald), H E Bull & Son (Whittlesey) and M J Claypole (Yaxley) funeral directors. At the time of merger, the way the Society marketed its funeral business and the prominence of the Anglia Co-operative brand on private name funeral homes was being reviewed.

Subsidiary undertaking	Principal activity
Anglia Co-operative (Food) Ltd.	Food retailing
Anglia Co-operative Properties Ltd.	Property management
Co-op Funeral Services (Anglia) Ltd.	Funeral services
Elite Electrical Ltd.	Non-trading
Food and Funeral Properties Ltd.	Property management
Plutarch Limited	Property management
Westgate Optical Ltd.	Ophthalmic opticians
Yaxley Farm Ltd.	Farming
Anglia Motor Group Ltd.	Non-trading
Anglia Wholesale Furniture Distribution Ltd.	Non-trading
ARCS Department Stores Ltd.	Non-trading
ARCS Electrical Superstores Ltd.	Non-trading
Rainbow Stores Ltd.	Non-trading

Anglia Motor Group previously sold Audi, Vauxhall, Honda and Fiat in King's Lynn, Vauxhall in Wisbech and Hunstanton and Proton in Beccles. It also operated a King's Lynn bodyshop trading as Bodyline.

Associated undertaking	Class of shares
J E Beale Plc	Preference
Anglia Home Furnishings Ltd.	Preference

Since 1999, co-operative chemists in the Society's trading area have been operated by National Co-operative Chemists, a wholly owned subsidiary of The Co-operative Group trading as The Co-operative Pharmacy. The business and assets of the former Anglia Dairies were transferred to Dairy Crest Group in 1997 for an aggregate consideration of £4.5m.

== History ==
The consumer co-operative movement has its roots in the early part of the nineteenth century and the principles of self-help and social equity that developed during the Victorian era. One of the first successful retail co-operatives was established in 1844 by the Rochdale Pioneers.

The society was founded as Peterborough Equitable Industrial Co-operative Society in 1876 and incorporated in 1887. It later absorbed the following societies, becoming Peterborough and District Co-operative Society and finally Greater Peterborough Regional Co-operative Society in 1982:

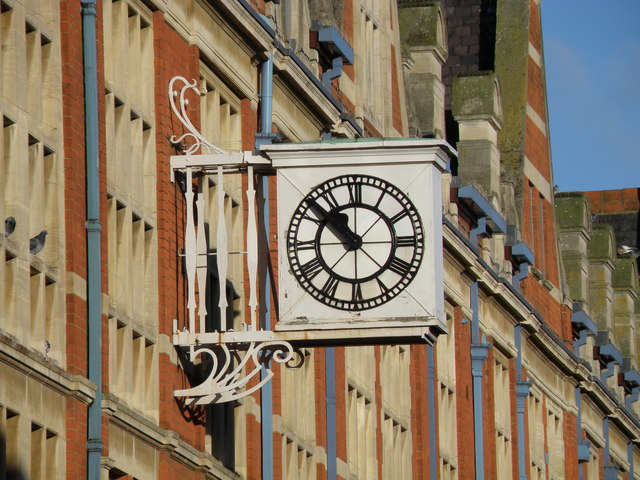
Memorial at Westgate House to the 31 workers that did not return from World War I, dedicated by the Bishop of Peterborough in 1921

Society	Established	Transferred
Oundle Industrial	1866	1915
St. Neots Industrial	1882	1983
Huntingdon Industrial	1866	1924
Wisbech Phoenix	1886	
King's Lynn	1888	1970
St. Ives (Hunts) Industrial	1889	
Chatteris	1900	1967

Stanley Tiffany, a director of the Society, was elected Labour Co-operative Member of Parliament for the Peterborough division of Northamptonshire at the 1945 general election.

Waveney Co-operative Society was formed in 1982 by the merger of Lowestoft Co-operative Society, founded in 1890 and Beccles Working Men's Co-operative Association, founded in 1879. In 1983, the Waveney Society absorbed Diss Co-operative Society, which had been established in 1898; it became Anglia Co-operative Society in 1986, shortly before transferring engagements to the Peterborough Society the following year.

== See also ==
- British co-operative movement
