= Co-operative Travel Trading Group =

- Company type: Business of a consumer co-operative
- Industry: Wholesale
- Predecessor: Co-op Retail Trading Group
- Founded: 2003; 23 years ago
- Defunct: 2012; 14 years ago
- Successor: The Co-operative Travel
- Headquarters: Manchester, United Kingdom
- Products: Travel agent
- Parent: The Co-operative Group

The Co-operative Travel Trading Group (or CTTG) was the central buying group for co-operative travel agents in the United Kingdom. It was established along the same lines as the Co-operative Retail Trading Group when the Co-operative Group merged its own five travel operations in 2003.

The CTTG was disbanded following the merger of the Co-operative Travel (including Midlands Co-operative Travel) with the High Street branches of the Thomas Cook Group in 2011. Following its closure, Midcounties Co-operative Travel said it “had no alternative but to create a standalone commercial and marketing capacity [and] in the spirit of the sixth co-operative principle, has agreed to make this service available to the Channel Islands Co-operative and Chelmsford Star Co-operative, who have also been affected by the joint venture decision. The partnerships will help them optimise their continued development as prominent independent agents.” Channel Islands’s Travelmaker is the leading independent in Jersey and Guernsey.

The East of England Co-operative travel business joined the Midcounties Co-operative Travel Consortium in 2013, whereas Lincolnshire Co-operative travel agencies joined Worldchoice when their arrangements with The Co-operative Group came to an end in 2012.

== Freedom Travel ==
Freedom Travel Limited, a subsidiary of Co-op Group Travel 2 Holdings Ltd., was established in 2001 and is an organisation of managed travel agents working together to secure a profitable future. It was originally formed to enable travel agents to become part of a larger buying group benefiting from better commissions, larger overrides, lower operating costs, lower bank charges and better technology. The Co-operative Travel at Anglia Co-operative Society is a trading name of the Freedom Travel Group, part of the Thomas Cook Group.

== See also ==
- Co-operative Retail Trading Group
