= Central England Co-operative =

Central England Co-operative Limited
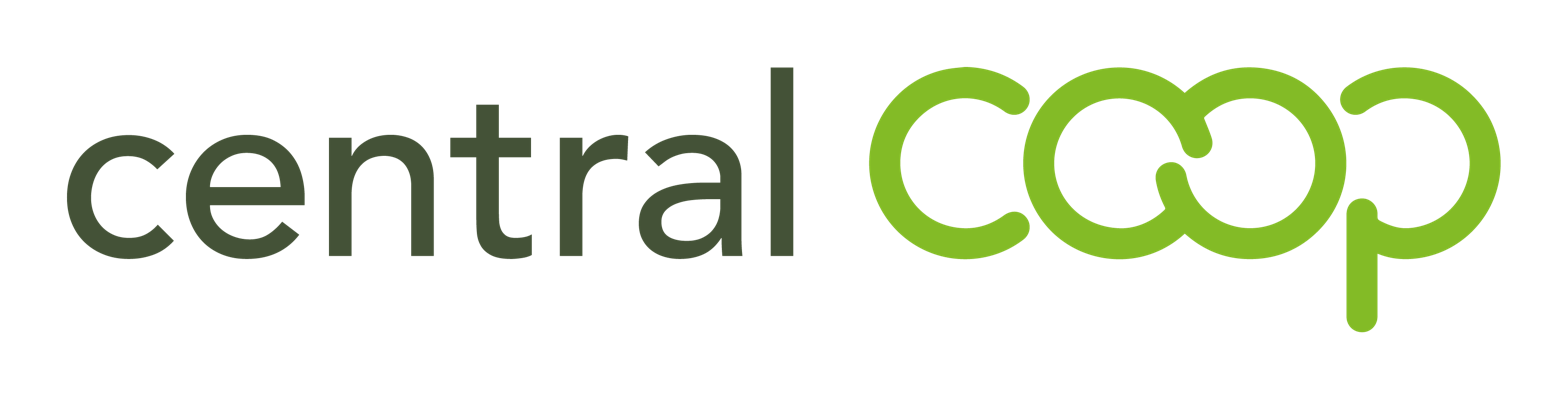
- Trade name: OurCoop
- Formerly: Central Co-op
- Type: Consumer co-operative
- Industry: Retail (Wholesale)
- Predecessor: Anglia Regional Co-operative Society; Midlands Co-operative Society; Midcounties Co-operative; Chelmsford Star Co-operative Society; Wooldale Co-operative Society
- Founded: 2013; 13 years ago (Original society founded in 1850)
- Headquarters: Central House, Queen Street, Lichfield, WS13 6QD, United Kingdom
- Area served: The Midlands, East of England, South East England, South West England
- Key people: Elaine Dean (President, Board of Directors); Debbie Robinson (Chief Executive)
- Revenue: ▼£883.9million (2025)
- Operating income: ▼£9.2 million (2025)
- Net income: ▲£9.5 million (2025)
- Total assets: ▼£746.0 million (2025)
- Total equity: ▲£292.2 million (2025)
- Members: ▲442,000 Active (2025)
- Number of employees: ▼6,715 (2025)
- Website: Official website

Central England Co-operative Limited, trading as OurCoop, is a regional consumer co-operative in the United Kingdom, based in Lichfield and trading from over 500 sites across the Midlands, East of England, South West, and South East. The business is owned and democratically controlled by its members who can stand for election to the board and who also share in the society's profits.

The society's key businesses are its 500 food stores, alongside travel agencies, funeral homes, nurseries and mobile, energy and internet service businesses. It has more than one million members and 13,000 employees across the UK.

The society has a permanent seat on the board of Co-operatives UK. It is an Independent Society Member of The Co-operative Group and the national buying group, Federal Retail Trading Services.

== History ==
Registered under the Co-operative and Community Benefit Societies Act 2014, Central England Co-operative is the largest independent retail co-operative in the UK. It was formed in 2014 following the merger of the Anglia Regional and Midlands Co-operative societies.

In 2017, members of the small neighbouring Wooldale Co-operative Society in West Yorkshire voted to transfer engagements to Central England Co-operative.

In 2022, the Society rebranded as Central Co-op and adopted the International Cooperative Alliance marque.

On 15 September 2025, Chelmsford Star Co-operative Society was transferred to Central England Co-operative.

The society merged with Warwick-based Midcounties Co-operative on 26 January 2026, and began trading as OurCoop. The merged society employed over 13,000 people, roughly doubling its size.

=== Anglia Regional Co-operative Society ===
Tracing its origins to 1876, Anglia Regional Co-operative was formed by the merger of the Greater Peterborough Regional and Anglia (formerly Waveney) co-operative societies in 1987. Headquartered in Peterborough, the society principally traded in the eastern counties of Bedfordshire, Cambridgeshire, Norfolk and Suffolk, although it had gained wider outreach through the acquisition of co-operative department stores in Yorkshire and the South East of England.

Following divestment of the Westgate department store and AHF businesses to JE Beale and the UK's largest worker co-operative, Anglia Home Furnishings Holdings, in 2011, Anglia Co-operative operated 27 retail stores, eight petrol stations, 21 travel agents, three opticians, a hair salon and 29 funeral homes. At the time of merger with the Midlands Co-operative it had 405,134 members (including over 189,000 regular trading members) and 1,600 employees.

=== Midlands Co-operative Society ===
Tracing its origins to Derby in 1850, the Midlands Co-operative Society was formed by the merger of the Central Midlands and Leicestershire co-operative societies in 1997. Headquartered in Lichfield, the Society traded in the English counties of West Midlands, Warwickshire, Worcestershire, Staffordshire, Derbyshire, Leicestershire, Rutland, Nottinghamshire, Northamptonshire, Lincolnshire, West and South Yorkshire through two distribution centres.

Following the merger of Midlands Co-op Travel and The Co-operative Travel with the retail branches of Thomas Cook in 2012, the Midlands Co-operative operated 200 retail stores, 15 petrol stations, 22 post offices, nine florists, two motor car dealerships and 90 funeral homes. At the time of merger with Anglia Co-operative it was UK Co-operative of the Year with 1,005,474 members (including over 140,000 regular trading members) and 7,000 employees.

== Trading ==
The society's key businesses are its 500 food stores, alongside travel agencies, funeral homes, nurseries and mobile, energy and internet service businesses.

=== Food retail and distribution centres ===
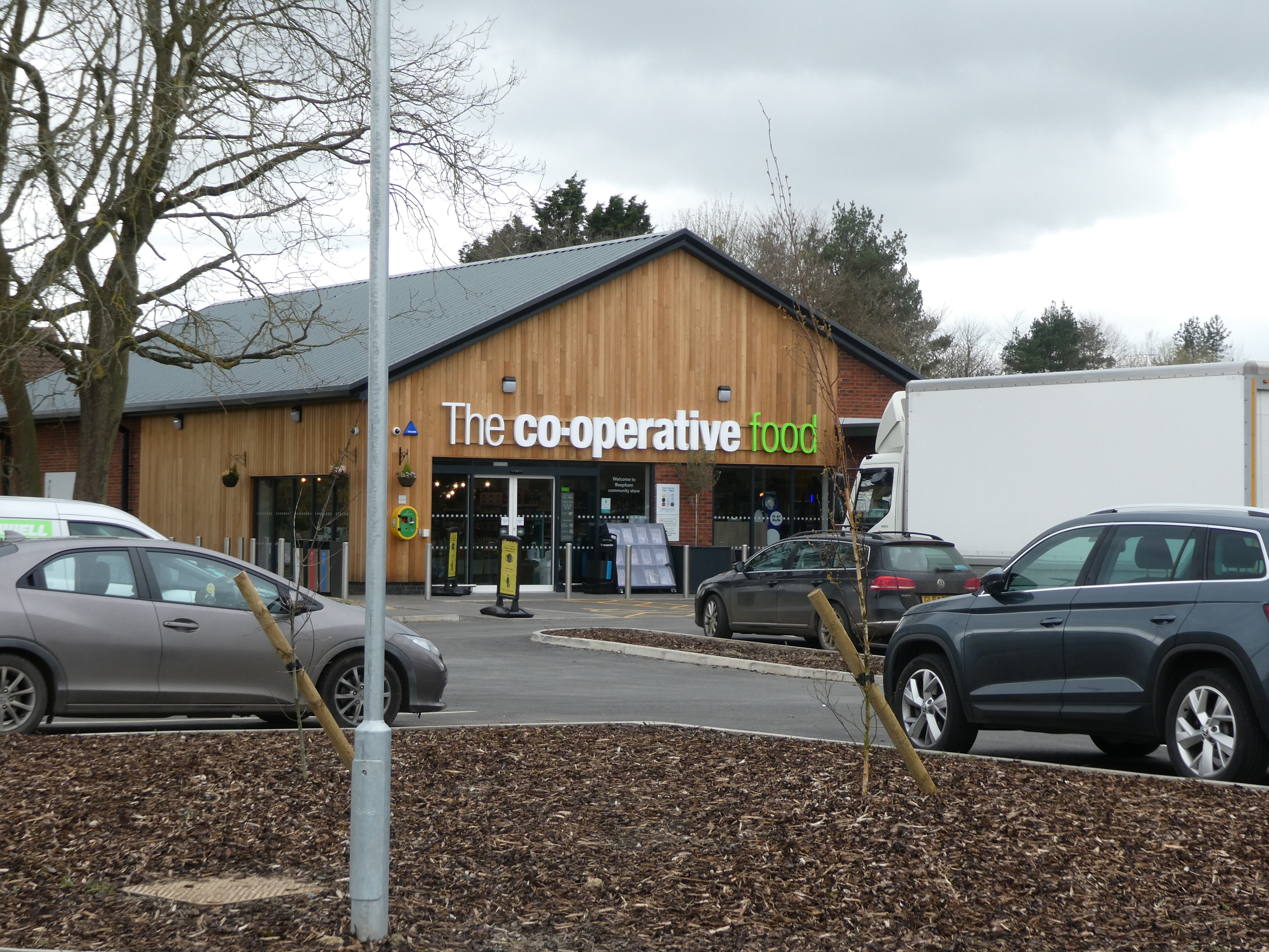
A Co-operative Food store in Reepham, Norfolk

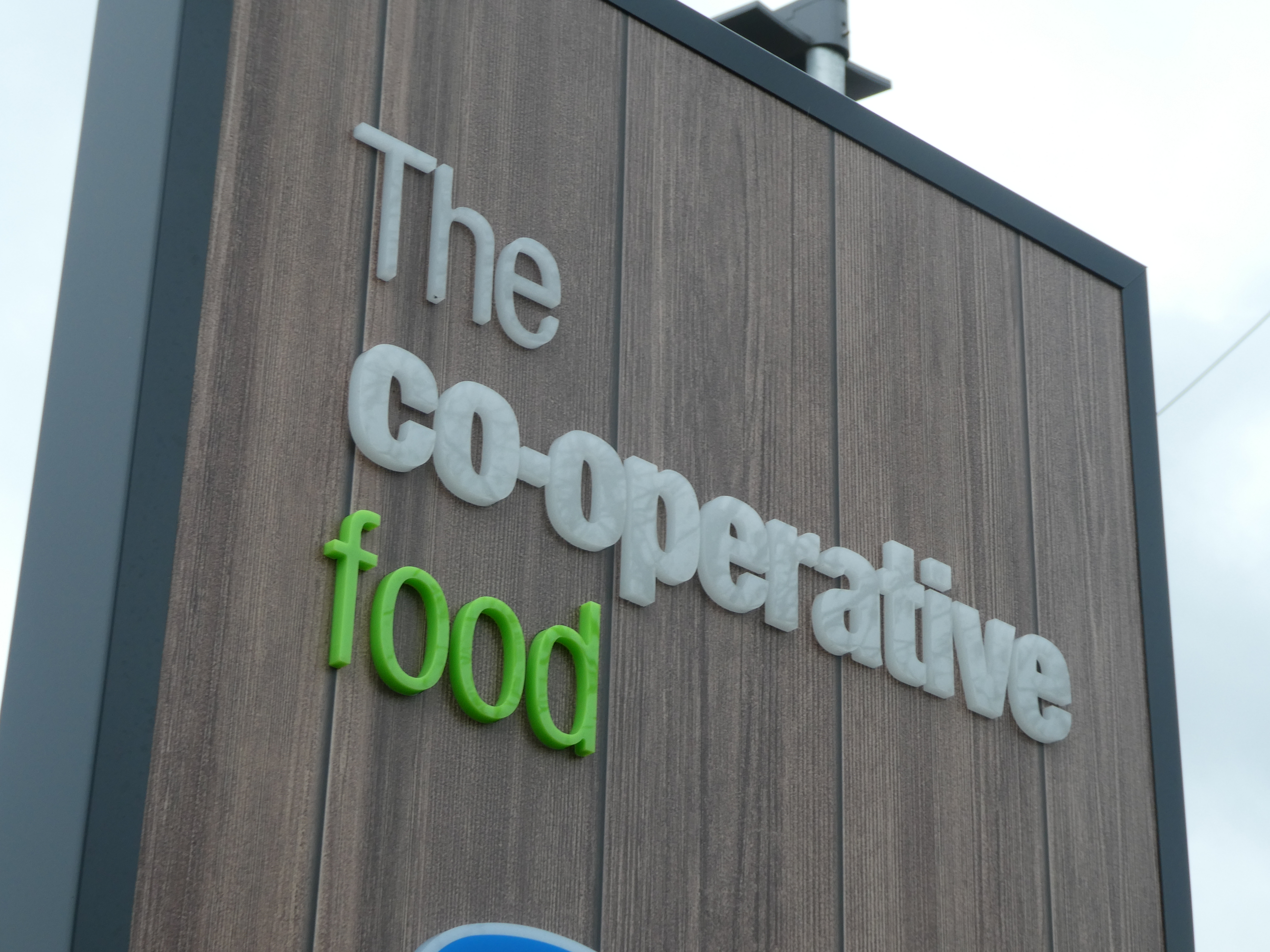
The Co-operative Food logo outside a store

Food retail is the Society's core business and accounts for the majority of its turnover. Prior to 2024, a distribution centre in Leicester supplied 235 supermarkets and convenience stores while also providing a service to neighbouring Heart of England and Tamworth co-operative branches.

Following the 2022 rebranding, the business chose to join the LIDIA (Logistics Integration and Development to Improve Availability) distribution network, becoming part of a national co-operative distribution and logistics operation that serve 4,000 stores with 13 distribution centres across the UK. This enabled the business to reinvest funds by opening 17 new stores in one year (seven more than their annual target).

In 2021, the business began a new venture with Insomnia Coffee Company, launching the first Insomnia food-coffee hybrid shop under the society's then trading name, Central Co-op.

22 food stores contain a Post Office counter and most offer Yodel postal services.

Central England Co-operative also operates 18 petrol filling stations with some of these associated with the co-op's larger supermarkets. However, it also operates a number of stand alone petrol stations, five of which were acquired through the purchase of Shaws Petroleum in 2013.

=== Funeral homes ===
Central England Co-operative operates over 150 funeral homes throughout its operating area, many under the original private names. It is a member of the National Association of Funeral Directors and its funeral bond scheme is monitored by the Funeral Planning Authority. The society also operates three memorial masonry showrooms across its trading area and operates a coffin manufacturing business.

The society owns Bretby Crematorium, set in woodland grounds adjacent to the A511 Leicester to Burton upon Trent road between Burton and Swadlincote.

=== Other businesses ===
The society operates more than 70 travel agencies, more than 40 nurseries, and mobile, energy and internet service businesses.

=== Former Businesses ===
==== Leicester Carriage Builders ====
Leicester Carriage Builders, a specialist vehicle building and conversion business, was formed in 1903 as Leicester Carriage Builders and Wheelwrights and began its association with the Society through the Leicestershire Co-operative in 1971. It is a member of the Vehicle Builders and Repairers Association. The business has converted vehicles for many purposes including mobile libraries, welfare vehicles and mobile 'walk in' post office vans. The business was closed during 2015.

==== The Co-operative Motor Group ====
The Co-operative Motor Group operated dealerships in Lincoln and Loughborough until the co-op's dealerships in Lincoln were sold and the Loughborough garage was closed during 2015.

==== The Co-operative Travel ====
From the late 2000s onwards, Central England Co-operative had 3.5% stake in a joint venture travel agent called The Co-operative Travel, which was owned by The Co-operative Group and Thomas Cook Group. Involvement in the joint venture came to an end in 2016 when Central England Co-operative (along with The Co-operative Group) were bought out by Thomas Cook. After that, Central England Co-operative continued to directly manage 21 former Anglia Co-operative travel shops, many of which were co-located in former Westgate premises. In 2020 it transferred 16 of its remaining branches to Midcounties Co-operative and closed the rest.

==== Westgate Opticians ====
The society had been providing general ophthalmic services for over 40 years, through branches in Peterborough, St. Neots and Hunstanton. Trading as Westgate Opticians, it carried out more than 200 eye examinations each week until the closure of the Beale's Department Store in Peterborough in 2020.

==== Florist services ====
Central England Co-operative operated 9 florists shops located throughout the former Midlands Co-operative trading area.

== Finances ==
In the last full year of trading, 2018/19, Central England Co-op recorded gross sales (excluding VAT) of £869.9m (£848.3m 2017/18) and a trading profit of £18.1m (£16.6m 2017/18). Operating profit of £11.9m, was lower than the prior year (2017/18: £16.6m). The society was able to pay its members a total of £3.5m (£3.7m 2017/18) in dividend and dividend bonus during the year. The Society also had net debt of £20.6m (£16.7m 2017/18) and a £109.8m (£179.6m 2017/18) pension deficit as at 26 January 2019. The Society's active membership was over 330,000. The highest paid director in 2018/19 was the former Chief Executive whose total earnings were £730,438 (£713,491 2017/18).

== Values and Principles ==
Because of its co-operative structure, the society has a set of values and principles which require the business to operate responsibly and to share its profits with its members and their communities. The focus of the societies community work focuses on the community dividend, member classes, its SENse to Aspire initiative and its charity partner but it is also involved with various other programmes as outlined below.

=== Community dividend ===
Each year the co-op distributes 1% of its profits to the communities in which it trades. The money is usually in the form of grants between £100 and £5000 to local groups, community projects and charities. During 2017, a total of £212,000 was distributed to 120 groups. In the first six years of the scheme more than £1 million has been distributed. Previous organisations which have received grant have included the Chesterfield Sea Cadets, the East Anglian Air Ambulance and a Cambridgeshire project to rehabilitate injured firefighters. Research by Co-operative News showed that in 2013 the amount given to the communities in which it trades in grants, donations and fund-raising by staff and members was equivalent to 8.7% of its pre-tax profits for the year.

=== Member classes ===
Central England Co‑operative has over 60 member groups attended by a total of 2,290 members. Classes are open to all members include painting, sugarcraft, line dancing, keep fit classes and a wine circle.

=== SENse to Aspire ===
Though a partnership with a school for children with special educational needs (SEN), Selly Oak Trust School in Birmingham, the Central England Co-operative organised and provided work experience for children at the school in one of their food stores or florist shops. Historically, only 7% of children with SEN find paid employment after they have finished their education and this programme aimed to improve this prospect for the children by providing them with the skills that they need to get (and keep) a job. Between 2013 and 2015, 151 students took part in the scheme and the co-op is working towards offering paid employment to some of the participants. This compares with an average of 2-3 students in previous years. For this work the society was commended as a finalist for the 2015 Business in the Community Inspiring Young Talent Award.

=== Charity partner ===
In the early 2010s, Central England Co-operative fundraised for their staff-elected charity, the Newlife Foundation. The charity aimed to provide specialist equipment for disabled and terminally ill children in the Midlands and East Anglia. The society raised over £1,000,000 for the charity.

=== Food banks ===
The society works with food banks within its trading area to provide food and support for individuals and families who are under severe financial pressure and are who suffering from 'food poverty'. The scheme operates by linking up food banks with local co-op food stores to raise awareness of how food banks can help people in financial distress through 'promotional days' and by encouraging customers and members to donate food from permanent collection bins within stores. The society planned to have all food stores affiliated with a local food bank (where possible) by 2016.

=== Responsible trading ===
As a part of the Co-operative Retail Trading Group, the society has promoted Fairtrade and stocks a wide array of Fairtrade products. The society also has food-sourcing commitments including the responsible sourcing of fish, free-range eggs and clear food-labelling. These commitments largely match those the commitments of The Co-operative Group, of whom the society is a corporate member.

As a regional food retailer the business has several commitments to local and regional sourcing with a range of products including ales, bakery produce, ciders, seasonal fresh produce, honey and oils available in the co-op's stores. The society previously pledged that, by 2018, 5% of food revenue will be products which are sourced within the region in which the business trades.

== Governance ==
The current governance arrangements have been in place since the merger of the Midlands and Anglia societies.

Twelve board members are elected from the society's membership with three customer-member and one employee-member being elected from each constituency at any one time. Additionally, the society has two non-executive directors, with a search committee existing to find and co-opt suitable candidates with these being elected by members at the members meetings. The co-op ran its first online and postal election using the new system in April 2014, with all members who have held a £1 share for six months being eligible to vote.

Members meetings are held twice a year with both customer-members and employee-members being encouraged to attend. Meetings are held at a number of locations across the trading region of the society including Leicester, Stafford, Kettering and Birmingham. At these events members vote on various motions including the distribution on a portion of the trading surplus as the 'Member Dividend' and the 'Community Dividend'.

The society also has three Membership and Community Councils (MCCs) with each representing one of the three (East, Central and Western) constituencies. There are 36 seats on the councils with nine customer-member and three staff-member seats for each of the constituencies.

== Membership ==
The society has more than one million members, who collect points on their purchases with any of the co-ops family of businesses. These points are converted into a share of the profits twice a year with members voting on the amount at the members meetings.

Members of Central England Co-operative can also earn points when trading with other co-operative societies whereby their share of the profit in the other business is transferred to, and paid by, Central England Co-operative from the other co-op every 6 months. Members of other societies can earn points whilst trading with Central England Co-operative as long as they present their membership card.

== Other activities ==
=== The Co-operative Party ===
The following local party councils are funded by Central England Co-operative to organise political activity:

Party	Area
Central England Anglia Co-operative Party	north Cambridgeshire and west Norfolk
Central England (formerly Midlands) Eastern and Southern Co-operative Party	Leicestershire, Northamptonshire and Rutland
Central England (formerly Midlands) Northern Co-operative Party	Derbyshire (excluding Erewash)
Central Midlands (formerly Midlands Western) Co-operative Party (with Midcounties Co-operative)	West Midlands, Warwickshire and south Staffordshire

== See also ==
- British co-operative movement
- Cooperatives
- Consumers' co-operative
- The Co-operative Group
- Co-operatives UK
