= Tamworth Co-operative Society =

Consumer co-operative in Tamworth, Staffordshire, England

Tamworth Co-operative Society Limited
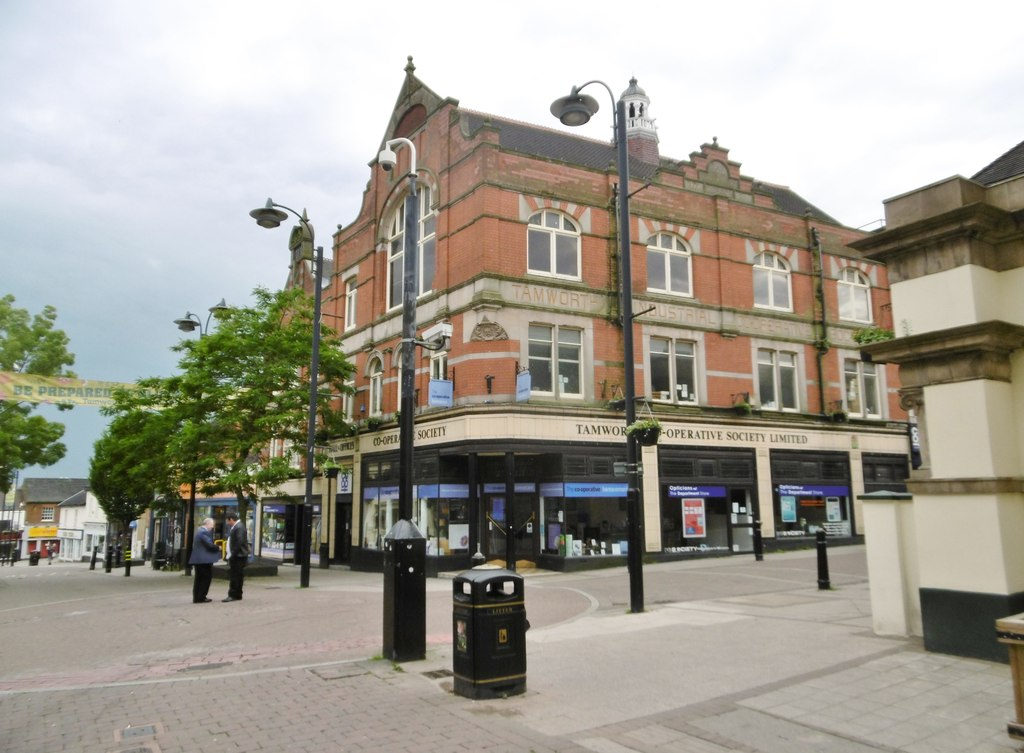
- The society's department store and headquarters in central Tamworth
- Formerly: Tamworth Industrial Co-operative Society Limited
- Type: Consumer co-operative
- Industry: Retail and funeral care
- Founded: 1886 in Tamworth
- Headquarters: 5 Colehill, Tamworth, Staffordshire, England
- Key people: RW Read (Chair); Julian Coles (CEO)
- Revenue: £23,392,000 (2019)
- Total assets: £13,681,000 (2019)
- Total equity: £2,380,723 (2019)
- Members: 20,193 (2019)
- Number of employees: 283
- Website: tamworth.coop

Tamworth Co-operative Society Limited is a small independent consumer co-operative in Tamworth, Staffordshire, England. The co-operative operates a department store, supermarket, 11 convenience stores, and eight funeral care locations, with over 20,000 members and an annual turnover in excess of £23m.

Arising from a sense of fair play, a meeting was held at the Victoria Road schoolroom in Tamworth on 13 November 1886, where it was proposed that "a co-operative society be formed in Tamworth". The motion was unanimously carried and the society began trading from a modest rented cottage on 10 December. On 15 March 1887 the society was legally incorporated as the Tamworth Industrial Co-operative Society Limited. The co-operative celebrated its centenary in 1986, when membership passed the 35,000 mark. In 2021 the society announced plans to close its department store, with it being turned into a business centre and college.

As a consumer co-operative the society is owned by its members, who are both customers and shareholders. Through the co-operative principle of one member one vote the society is governed by a member-elected board of directors alongside annual general meetings. The society is a member of Co-operatives UK, The Co-operative Group and the Federal Retail and Trading Services food buying group.

== See also ==
- British co-operative movement
