= Olio (app) =

Food sharing app

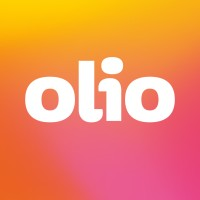
- Company type: Private
- Industry: Mobile app
- Founders: Tessa Clarke, Saasha Celestial-One
- Headquarters: London, United Kingdom
- Areas served: Worldwide (currently in 49 countries)
- Products: Food-sharing app
- Number of employees: 100 (2023)
- Website: olioapp.com

Olio is a mobile app for sharing by giving away, getting, borrowing or lending things in your community for free, aiming to reduce household and food waste. It does this by connecting neighbours with spare food or household items to others nearby who wish to pick up those items. The food must be edible; it can be raw or cooked, sealed or open. Non-food items often listed on Olio include books, clothes and furniture.

Those donating surplus food can be individuals or companies such as food retailers, restaurants, corporate canteens, food photographers etc., and donations can take place on an ad-hoc or recurrent basis. For example, some supermarket chains in the UK, including Tesco, the Midcounties Co-operative, Morrisons, Sainsbury's and Iceland have piloted Olio as an 'online food bank' to donate food and to reduce their waste. In March 2022, Olio partnered with Pandamart in Singapore.

First launched in early 2015 by Tessa Clarke and Saasha Celestial-One, by October 2017 the company had raised $2.2 million in funding. Olio subsequently performed a series A funding round of $6 million in 2018 and a Series B of $43 million. Notable investors include Accel, Octopus Ventures and VNV Global. The Olio app had around 7 million registered users as of May 2023.

== See also ==
- Food loss and waste
- Sharing economy
