= The Co-operative Travel =

British travel agency brand

- The Co-operative Travel logo

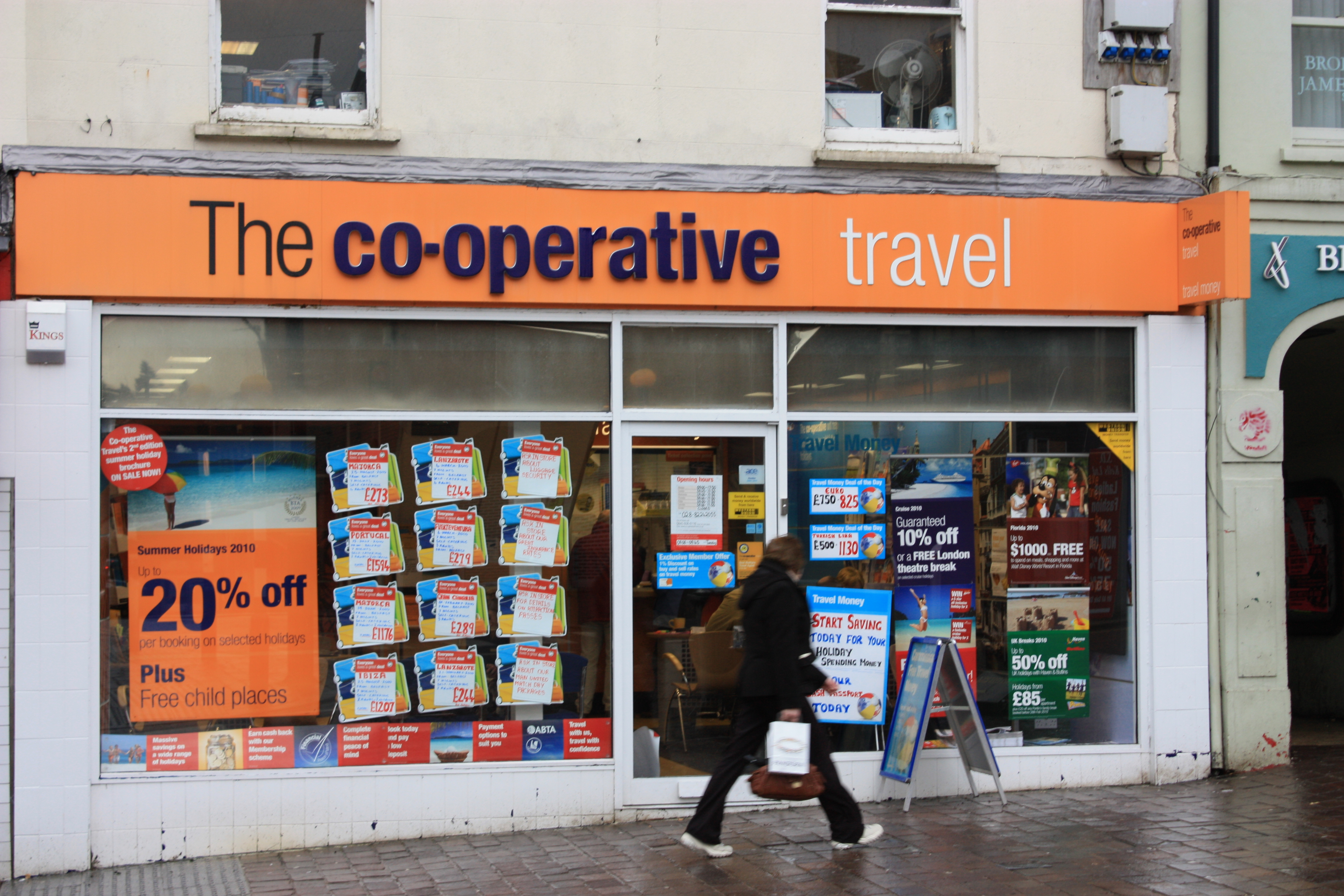
- A shop using The Co-operative Travel brand in Omagh, Northern Ireland in 2010
- Product type: Travel agency
- Current owner: Midcounties Cooperative, other Co-operatives
- Country: United Kingdom
- Introduced: 2008; 18 years ago
- Related brands: The Co-operative brand
- Markets: United Kingdom

The Co-operative Travel is a travel agency brand used by some independent retail co-operatives in the United Kingdom, such as Midcounties Co-operative, through their access to The Co-operative brand. Between 2011 and 2016, the brand was also used by TCCT Retail Limited, a travel agency run as a joint venture between the Thomas Cook Group, The Co-operative Group, and Central England Co-operative.

TCCT Retail was based at Peterborough Business Park at Lynch Wood, Peterborough. It was a member of ABTA and held an ATOL licence. It also acted as an agent for licensed tour operators. In 2016, Thomas Cook completed a buy-out of The Co-operative Group and Central England Co-operative's 33.5% shareholding. The TCCT website closed in 2017, and all existing bookings were transferred to Thomas Cook. During 2017–18, Thomas Cook rebranded its The Co-operative Travel branches to the Thomas Cook name. After the buy-out, the brand "Co-op Travel" continued to be used by independent cooperatives.

== Present day ==
Several co-operatives around the UK operate independent travel agents that use the Co-operative brand. The Midcounties Co-operative is the largest independent co-operative currently using the "Co-op Travel" brand within the UK, trading online and offline from their headquarters in Walsall.

== History ==
The Co-operative Wholesale Society (CWS) opened its first Excursion Department in 1905 to work with railways, steamers, and tour operators to obtain the best rates for co-operative society excursions. In 1920, CWS arranged its first overseas excursion and published its first holiday guide. By the 1950s, the CWS Travel Service had become one of the five largest travel agencies in Britain and had begun to organize air travel for co-operative societies and their members.

CWS Travel became known as Travelcare when the Co-operative Wholesale Society merged with Co-operative Retail Services in 2000 to form The Co-operative Group. The Co-operative Travel was formed by the integration of the Manchester-based Travelcare business with United Co-operatives' Co-op Travel subsidiary on the merger of the two societies in 2007.

=== Joint venture ===
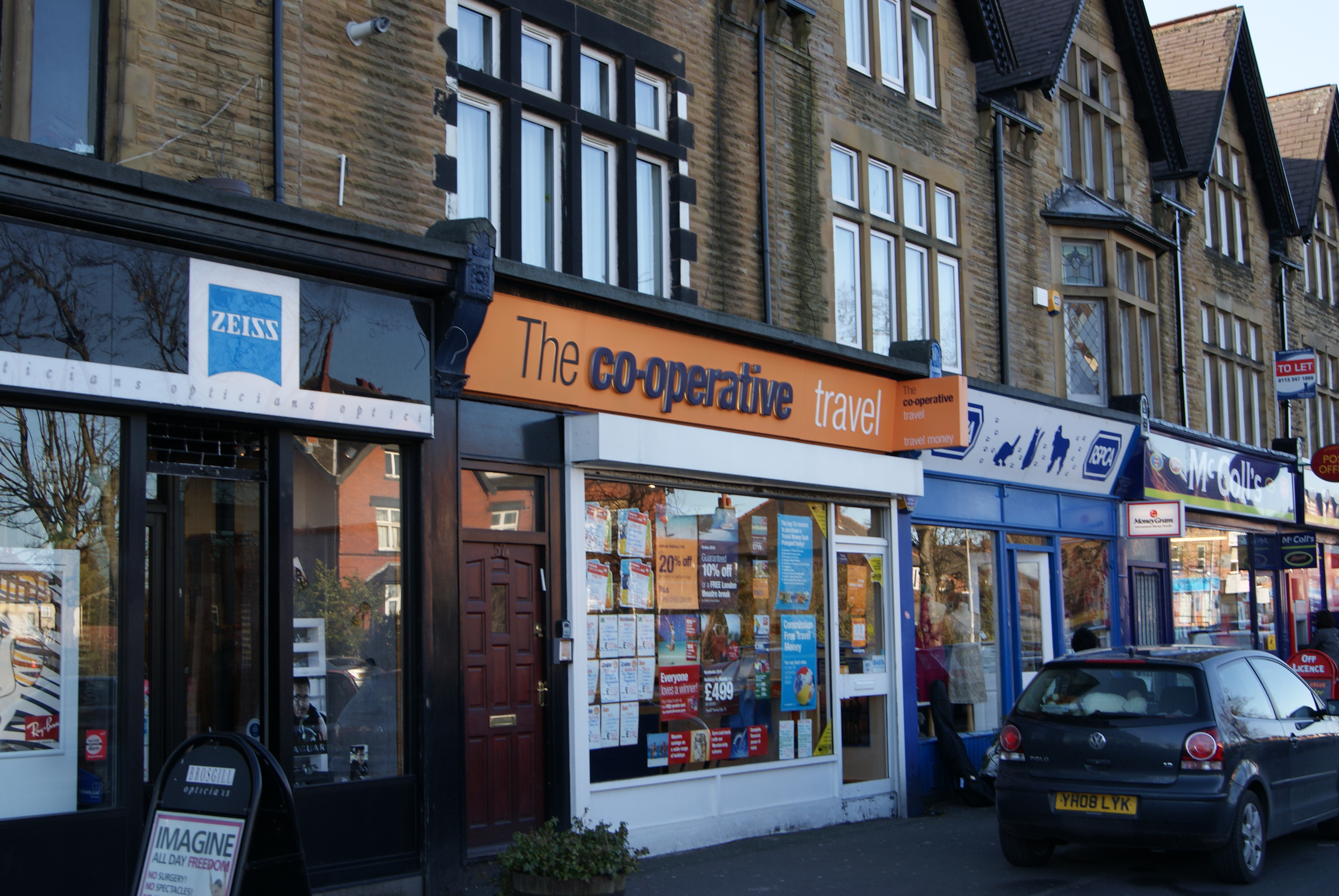
A branch of The Co-operative Travel in Roundhay, Leeds, England in 2010

It was announced in 2010, that Co-op Group Travel 1 Ltd. and Midlands Co-op Travel Ltd. would merge with the retail branches of Thomas Cook Group. The joint venture did not include the latter's tour operating arm, which remained wholly within the Thomas Cook Group. The new network was 66.5%-owned by Thomas Cook, 30%-owned by The Co-operative Group and 3.5%-owned by Central England Co-operative. Both chains retained their own branding, except for the small number of Thomas Cook's "Going Places" shops which were rebranded as The Co-operative Travel. The partnership arrangement helped to retain the heritage and ethics of The Co-operative brand and to ensure the consistency of message.

The merger included the Co-operative's home-working division, Future Travel Limited, trading as "The Co-operative Personal Travel Advisors". These consultants worked from home, primarily by telephone, providing the same range of services as the High Street branches but for extended opening hours.

In 2010, the Office of Fair Trading (OFT) was given 45 working days to review whether to formally oppose the merger. The Office of Fair Trading requested a referral from the European Commission and, in turn, referred the case to the Competition Commission in March 2011. In July 2011, it was announced that the Competition Commission raised no objections to the merger. As a result of the merger, the business became part of the Thomas Cook Group.

In 2016, the Co-operative Group decided that having a minority stake in a travel business no longer fit with its strategy and said that it would exercise its option to quit the joint venture. Thomas Cook announced it would buy out the stakes owned by The Co-operative Group and Central England Co-operative, taking full control of the retail network and rebranding the high street travel stores that had operated under the Co-operative brand gradually during 2017–18. Thomas Cook's UK travel agencies were sold to Hays Travel in 2019 after Thomas Cook had been liquidated.

While it was involved in the joint venture, Central England Co-operative continued to operate a network of Co-operative Travel branches which were managed separately from Thomas Cook. This arose from the 2013 merger of the Midlands Co-operative Society which had joined the venture and the Anglia Regional Co-operative Society which continued to operate its travel branches independently.

== Operations ==
The Co-operative Travel offered a range of services including package holidays, city breaks, hotels, flights, cruises, and skiing holidays. Foreign exchange services were also available, including American Express traveller's cheques. The Co-operative Travel Cash Passport was issued by Travelex, and travel insurance was underwritten by White Horse Insurance Ireland. All flights and flight-inclusive holidays were financially protected by the ATOL scheme.

== See also ==
- Co-operative Travel Trading Group
