= Channel Islands Co-operative Society =

Consumer co-operative in the Channel Islands

The Channel Islands Co-operative Society Limited
- Trade name: Channel Islands Coop
- Type: Consumer cooperative
- Industry: Retail
- Founded: 1919
- Headquarters: St Helier, Jersey
- Key people: Mark Cox (CEO)
- Products: Grocery, Fuel, Homeware, Travel, Property, Funeralcare, Medical Services, Pharmacy
- Revenue: ▲£183.6 million (2018–19)
- Operating income: ▲£8.796 million (2018–19)
- Net income: ▲£940,000 (2018–19)
- Number of employees: ▲1,146 (2018–19)
- Website: channelislands.coop

The Channel Islands Co-operative Society Limited, trading as Channel Islands Coop, is a long-established consumer co-operative with stores in the Channel Islands. Its head office is located in Saint Helier in Jersey.

In the year ending 13 January 2019, Channel Islands Co-op recorded sales of £183.6 million (£174.5 million 2017–18) and a profit after tax of £940,000 (£745,000 2017–18). The Society was able to pay its members a 4% dividend (4% 2017–18) as a share of profits, with the total reported member benefits amounting to £7.97 million, inclusive of Dividend, Dividend stamps, travel vouchers and share interest. The Society had a £5.8 million (£6.8 million 2017–18) pension deficit. Society membership was 128,350 in 2019, slightly up on the 126,751 figure in 2018.

== History ==
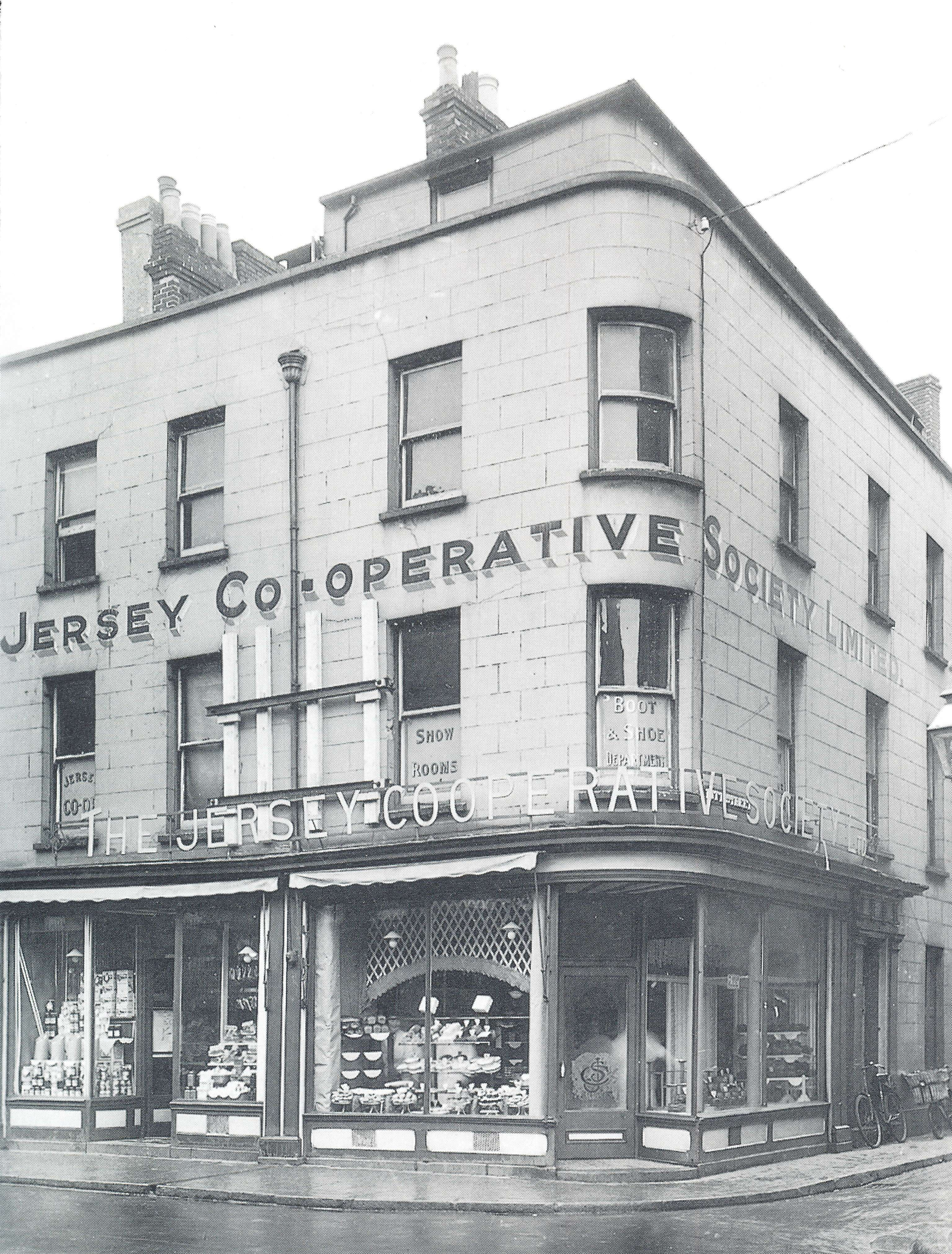
Jersey Co-operative Society store on Charing Cross, St Helier in 1919

The Jersey Co-operative Society was formed in 1919 and the Guernsey Co-operative Society followed in 1947. Both predecessors were supported by a CWS supervisory committee, which meant their accounts were liable to UK taxation. Growing objection to this persuaded the CWS to propose a merger which led to the incorporation of the Channel Islands' Society in 1955.

In August 2013, it was announced that the company's two Channel Island Homemaker warehouses would be closed, and replaced with a single warehouse in the UK.

== Activities ==
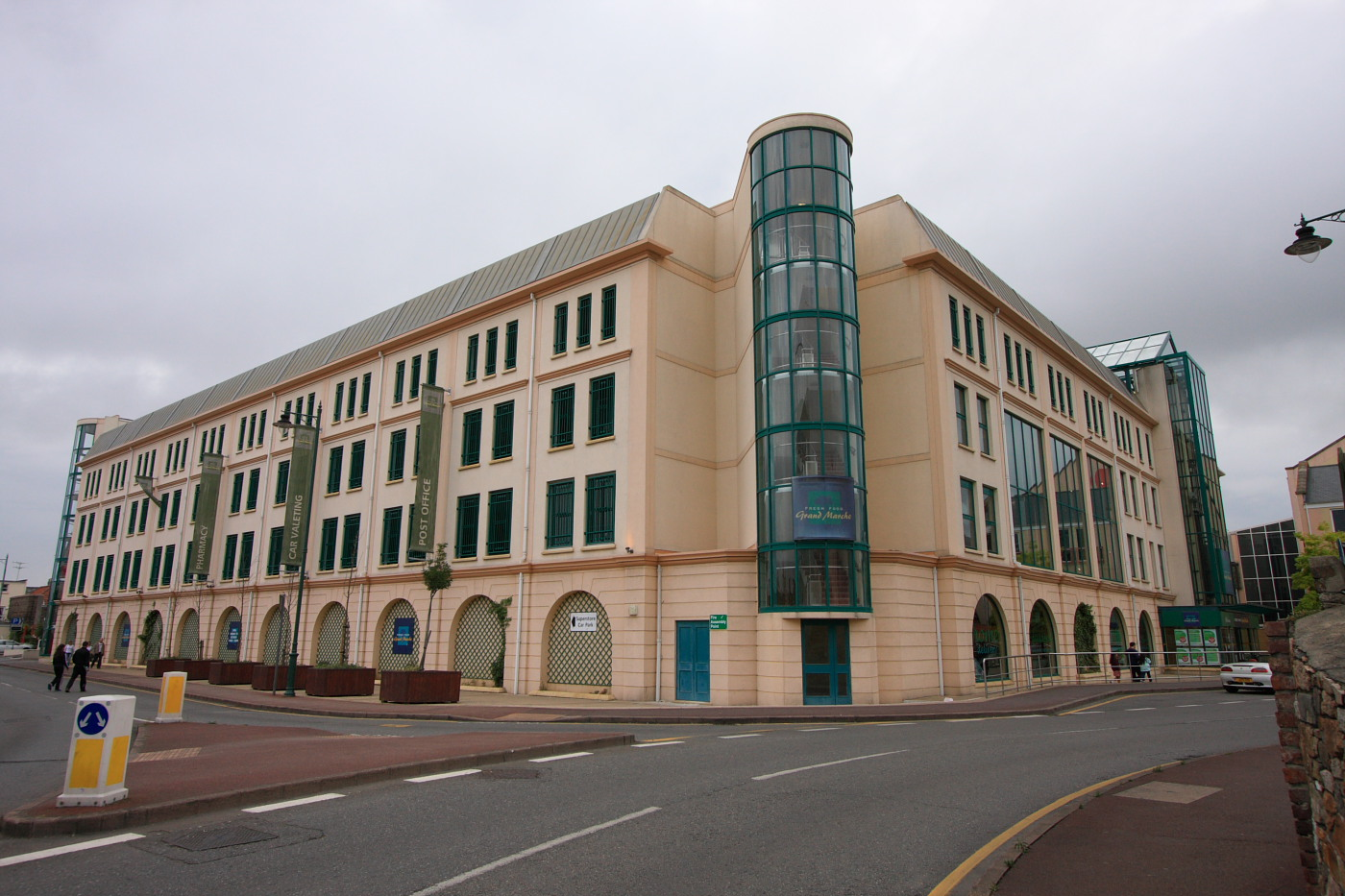
The Grand Marché, a CICS supermarket in Saint Helier, Jersey

The society operates twelve grocery stores in Jersey and ten in the island of Guernsey. The largest of these are called Grand Marché, the stores with a petrol forecourt trade as En Route and the convenience stores trade as Locale; all of these charge the same retail prices. In addition the society operates Travelmaker, funeral care, member services through its post office network, 'Pharmacy Locale and Medical Care businesses. Membership is open to all residents of the Channel Islands when they open a share account for £1. Members receive a share of the profits in the form of dividends.

The Channel Islands' Co-operative Society is a UK-registered industrial and provident society, a member of the Co-operative Union in the United Kingdom, Federal Retail Trading Services, the Co-operative Travel Trading Group and a corporate member of The Co-operative Group (formerly Co-operative Wholesale Society), the largest consumer co-operative in the world.

== See also ==
- British co-operative movement
- Credit unions in the United Kingdom
