= Midcounties Co-operative =

British consumer co-operative

The Midcounties Co-operative Limited
- Trade name: Your Co-op
- Type: Consumer Co-operative
- Industry: Retail (Wholesale)
- Predecessor: Oxford, Swindon and Gloucester Co-operative Society and the West Midlands Co-operative Society
- Founded: 30 March 1969; 57 years ago
- Defunct: 25 January 2026
- Fate: Merged with Central England Co-operative
- Headquarters: Co-operative House, Warwick Technology Park, Gallows Hill, Warwick, Warwickshire, England, CV34 6DA
- Key people: Phil Ponsonby (CEO)
- Products: Food; Travel; Utilities; Early Years; Post Office; Flexible Benefits
- Revenue: ▲£840.2 million (2025)
- Operating income: ▲£10.6 million (2025)
- Net income: ▲ -£6.5 million (2025)
- Total assets: ▼£451.8 million (2025)
- Total equity: ▼£104.8 million (2025)
- Members: ▲ >758,000 (2025)
- Number of employees: ▼6,376 (2025)
- Website: midcounties.coop

The Midcounties Co-operative Limited, latterly trading as Your Co-op, was an independent consumer co-operative in the United Kingdom with over 758,000 members. Tracing its origins to 1853, it merged with Central England Co-operative in 2026.

The society's key businesses was its food stores, alongside travel agencies, funeral homes, nurseries, flexible benefits, mobile, energy and internet service businesses. It operated across the West Midlands, South West, and South East, however some of its businesses traded nationally. It was headquartered in Warwick, Warwickshire.

== History ==
The Midcounties Co-operative was formed in 2005, by the merger of the Oxford, Swindon and Gloucester Co-operative Society and the West Midlands Co-operative Society. As a result, the society's geographical trading area spans ten counties: Berkshire, Gloucestershire, Northamptonshire, Oxfordshire, Shropshire, Staffordshire, Warwickshire, West Midlands, Wiltshire, and Worcestershire.

On 1 October 2025, The Midcounties Co-operative and Central England Co-operative announced that they were exploring the possibility of merging into a single society. Following the overwhelming approval of members on 2 December 2025, legal completion concluded on 26 January 2026, with the transfer of engagements and launch of the OurCoop family of businesses.

== Businesses ==
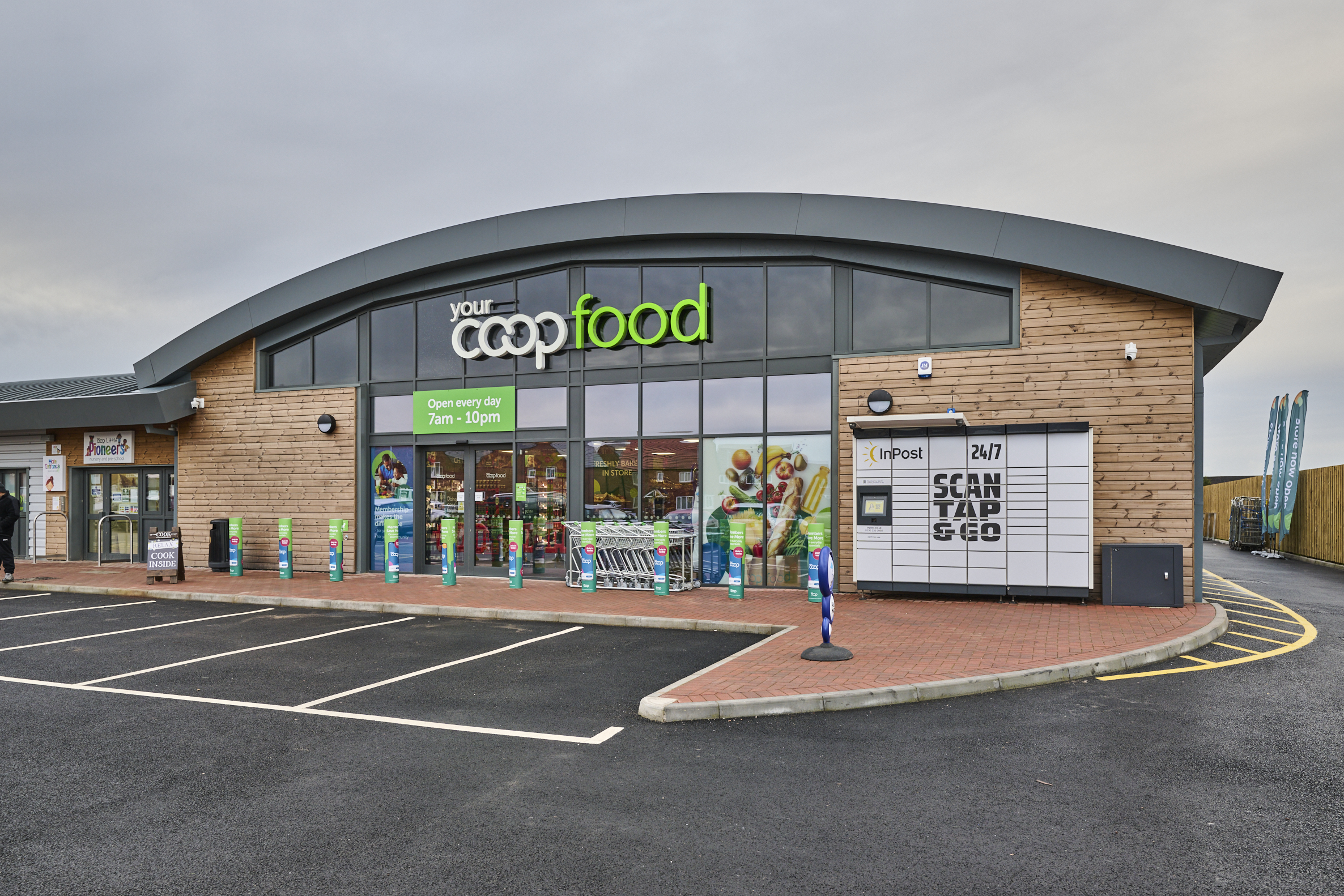
Midcounties food store in Apley, Telford

The Midcounties Co-operative operated a range of businesses: food stores, travel agencies, funeral homes, nurseries, flexible benefits, mobile, energy and internet service businesses.

=== Food ===
The Midcounties Co-operative was one of the largest independent food retailers in the country with 294 stores, branded as Your Coop Food.

=== Travel ===
The Midcounties Co-operative operated 71 travel branches across Midcounties' trading area and controlled the Cooptravel.co.uk and Co-operativeski.co.uk websites. It also has its own tour operator – Co-op Holidays. The Midcounties Co-operative travel business was branded Your Coop Travel).

It was distinct from the former business The Co-operative Travel which was owned and operated as a joint venture by Thomas Cook, The Co-operative Group and Central England Co-operative. That business was rebranded to the Thomas Cook name during 2017–18, its branches subsequently being acquired by Hays Travel upon the liquidation of Thomas Cook.

In 2020, the Midcounties travel business acquired 16 travel branches and employees from the Central England Co-operative.

=== Early years ===
In 2002, the society became the first UK co-operative to open a children's day care facility. Your Coop Childcare, which had many sites branded as Little Pioneers, operated 45 nurseries across the UK. The acquisition of the Buffer Bear nursery chain in 2010 saw its Childcare business begin to trade nationally, with nurseries spanning from Newcastle to Southampton.

=== Co-operative Flexible Benefits ===
Co-operative Flexible Benefits provided reward and recognition benefits to employers to promote high performance, motivation and engagement. The childcare voucher scheme which it operated was closed to new entrants in October 2018. As a result, the childcare voucher part of the business was wound down.

=== Post Office ===
The Society ran 74 post offices across its trading area and the majority were located within Your Co-op food stores, offering an essential service for customers.

=== Utilities ===
On 28 April 2018 members of The Phone Co-op, previously an independent society, voted to transfer its engagements to and merge memberships with Midcounties. A confirmatory vote held after the Midcounties AGM on 12 May 2018 was passed, allowing Midcounties to broaden its utilities offer. The merger took place on 1 June 2018, with members of The Phone Co-op joining Midcounties membership.

Midcounties Co-operative also had an agreement with Octopus Group to market and distribute energy products under the Co-op Energy brand, following the sale of its interest in the Co-op Energy supply business to Octopus Energy in 2019. A joint venture, Younity, also provided investment in new community energy projects, offered practical support to community groups and aimed to increase the volume of energy purchased from community schemes; thereby encouraging more small-scale generation across the UK.

== Former businesses ==
=== Motorworld ===
Motorworld (also known as The Co-operative Motors) was a co-operative car dealership. Its franchises included Volkswagen, Audi, Volvo, Mitsubishi, Mazda and Hyundai. The Midcounties Co-operative intended it to be the most socially responsible car dealership in the UK, but sold it off in January 2010 at a loss of £2.4 million.

=== Energy supply ===
The Midcounties Co-operative's energy business, The Co-operative Energy, supplied gas and electricity to UK homes. The business was established in 2010, launching as a lately internet based provider but was largely unknown. Criticised by customers in 2015 after a failed IT upgrade to its online customer service and billing system caused numerous problems and a large backlog in dealing with issues. In the first quarter of 2015 it was the fourth most complained about utility company, measured in complaints per thousand customers. In subsequent quarters it became the second worst and then the worst for the period July–September according to the official Energy Ombudsman. By the end of 2016 these issues had been resolved and the company was paying out £1.8 million in compensation to customers.

The Midcounties Co-operative announced the sale of its energy supply business, including Flow Energy, GB Energy and Co-op Energy, to Octopus Group for an undisclosed sum in August 2019. Customers were transferred to Octopus Energy, while Midcounties continues to market and distribute energy products under the Co-op Energy brand.

=== Newspaper delivery to homes ===
The society briefly ran a service offering newspaper delivery. It's grocery stores continue to sell newspapers but the traditional newsagent home delivery business was exited.

=== Pharmacy ===
In 2021, the Midcounties Co-operative completed a review of its health care business selling 29 of its 30 pharmacies branches to focus on its digital healthcare offering. The pharmacy group controlled the cooppharmacy.coop website and in 2013 launched an online doctor service providing online medical care and prescriptions direct to customers' homes. The online pharmacy business ceased trading in January 2023.

=== Health Food Store ===
The society operated a single store, with a small, dedicated team, for approximately 20 years.

=== Funeralcare ===
The Midcounties Co-operative, which operated as The Co-operative Funeralcare, provided 85 funeral homes and three masonry sites. The group had over 150 years' experience in providing funeral care to its local communities. After a business review in 2021, the majority of funeral homes were transferred to Central England Co-operative.

=== Member Share Account Kiosks ===
Traditional staffed counters inside co-op premises for members to conduct withdrawals and subscriptions into their share accounts (common when few people had bank accounts) have been withdrawn. The service was accessible via post at the head office, where a team administers account books and certificates. Subscriptions were by application only and at the member's risk.

== Membership ==
Membership is open to all, with members receiving a share of the profits in the form of dividend. Members are entitled to a share in the business after investing a minimum of £1, which is automatically deducted from the first dividend payment. The scheme is run in conjunction with The Co-operative Group membership, allowing a Midcounties card to be used at businesses operated by other participating societies.

Members receive exclusive member's price discounts.

== Values and responsible trading ==
The Midcounties Co-operative had four values on which the business is run, consisting of Democracy, Openness, Equality and Social Responsibility. These values were derived from the Co-operative Movement's founding values.

The society was run in a democratic way, with its board of directors voted for by its members.

Midcounties Co-operative did, however, fail to pay the national minimum wage to some newspaper delivery staff for four years, and following a HM Revenue and Customs investigation in 2016 paid more than £14,000 back pay due to one staff member. This is the highest single payout made in the UK following a HMRC investigation. In 2014 an internal complaint had been made, but this had been rejected by Midcounties Co-operative management. Back pay may be due to up to 200 other newspaper delivery staff. The breach was due to Midcounties Co-operative unreasonably estimating the time taken to carry out a delivery round. Additionally one member of staff was working seven days a week and taking little holiday, a breach of the working time regulations.

=== Community work ===
The society donated £287,000 to good causes during 2024/25 and provided support for 476 community groups, as well as enabling colleagues to volunteer over 11,600 hours to support local communities. The co-op supported 40 local foodbanks and raised over £32,000 during the year to provide essential food items for those in need.

=== Fair Tax ===
In 2013 the society set out its tax charter and in 2014 became one of the first three businesses in the UK to be awarded the Fair Tax Mark. This certification shows that the business is transparent about its tax affairs and does not engage in tax avoidance.

=== Environment ===
The society reduced its energy consumption across the business by 6% during 2024/25 and has cut its carbon emissions by 39% since 2019. The society has also cut its controllable food waste by 25% and reduced the amount of food items going to landfill by over 700,000 through partnerships with Too Good To Go and Olio.

In contrast to this, and the group's stated environmental values, The Co-operative Energy business, run by The Midcounties Co-operative, purchased less than 5% of its electricity from renewable sources in 2015. It also had a relatively large portion of coal within its main fuel mix, 37% more than the UK average in 2015. A February 2016 decision to stop purchasing coal resulted in the fuel source being phased out of its mix over the following three years as contracts expired. As of 2024, 100% of Co-op Energy's fuel mix was from renewable sources.

=== Co-operative Development ===
In 2022 the society made a pledge to support the creation of 50 new co-ops over five years. Partnering with Plunkett Foundation and Co-operative Futures, they have so far helped created 31 new co-ops and community businesses across their core trading area. The society was also a founding member of Bright Future Co-operative, helping survivors of modern slavery find work.

=== The Co-operative Party ===
The following local party councils are funded by Midcounties Co-operative to organise political activity:

Party	Region
Midcounties Oxfordshire Co-operative Party	South East of England
Midcounties Gloucestershire and Swindon Co-operative Party	South West of England
Central Midlands (formerly Midcounties West Midlands) Co-operative Party (with Central England Co-operative)	West Midlands

== Key achievements ==
The society was awarded Energy Project of the Year at the Energy Awards 2024 and joint venture Younity won the Sector Support Award at the Community Energy England Awards 2024.

Midcounties scored 87% in Business in the Community’s responsible business tracker in 2024/25, which measures the overall performance of businesses against the global sustainable development goals. They were one of only four businesses to score more than 80%.

Its Fairer Futures Programme, which provides work experience and training for those facing barriers to employment, received the Community Engagement Programme of the Year at the People in Retail Awards.

== See also ==
- British co-operative movement
- Credit unions in the United Kingdom
