= Federal Retail Trading Services =

British central buying group

Federal Retail Trading Services Limited
- Type: Co-operative Federation
- Industry: Wholesale
- Founded: 2015 (1993 as CRTG)
- Headquarters: One Angel Square, Manchester, UK
- Products: Groceries
- Parent: Managed by The Co-operative Group
- Website: frts.coop

Federal Retail and Trading Services Limited (FRTS) is the central buying group for co-operative retail societies in the United Kingdom. It came into its current structure in 2015, though its predecessor was established in 1993, and it supplies almost all food bought for sale by the over 4,000 co-operative foodstores in the UK. The buying group is owned and controlled by each of its member societies but is managed by The Co-operative Group on their behalf. It operates by pooling the collective £8.5bn buying power for 18 co-operative societies in the UK, allowing them to negotiate better prices from suppliers, so as to compete effectively with other UK supermarket chains.

Federal Retail and Trading Services is a member of the Ethical Trading Initiative (ETI).

The current FRTS Managing Director is David McKnight

== Co-operative Retail Trading Group (1993-2015) ==
The Co-operative Retail Trading Group (CRTG) was established in 1993 by the Co-operative Wholesale Society to centralise buying power for retail co-operatives in the UK. By 2002 it had become the central buying group for all of the major food retailing co-operatives, after being joined by the last two independent societies. The CRTG lost its complete control over the food co-op sector in 2014 however after the Clydebank Co-operative Society left the buying group. After the financial crisis in The Co-operative Group it was decided that The Group should no longer be responsible for the central buying group (the CRTG) as, if it had have collapsed, it could have led to the collapse of the independent co-operative societies as they would have had major difficulties in sourcing produce.

== Consortium of Independent Co-operatives (Pre-1998) ==
Prior to 1998, the CRTG faced competition within the retail co-operative movement from another grocery buying group: the Consortium of Independent Co-operatives (CIC), which was led by Co-operative Retail Services until its merger with the Co-operative Wholesale Society. Several of the larger regional co-operatives of the time were members of CIC: Portsea, Scotmid, United, and Yorkshire. In 1998, the CIC supplied £1 billion of goods annually, and the CRTG £2.5 billion.

== Federal Retail and Trading Services (2015-date) ==
A new buying group, Federal Retail and Trading Services, was established in 2015 and differs from its predecessor most notably in that each member co-operative has equal control over the business, whereas previously control was proportional to total amount purchased (giving The Co-operative Group dominant control). Although each member now has an equal voice, FRTS continues to be managed by The Co-operative Group.

In 2016, FRTS commenced a project to explore potential co-operation with other European co-operative buying groups, including Coop Trading in Scandinavia. The project went nowhere, although Channel Islands Co-operative Society, which led the exploration, now buys a range of French foods from a non co-op.

== See also ==
- Co-operative Travel Trading Group
