= Consumers' co-operative =

Enterprise owned and managed democratically by consumers

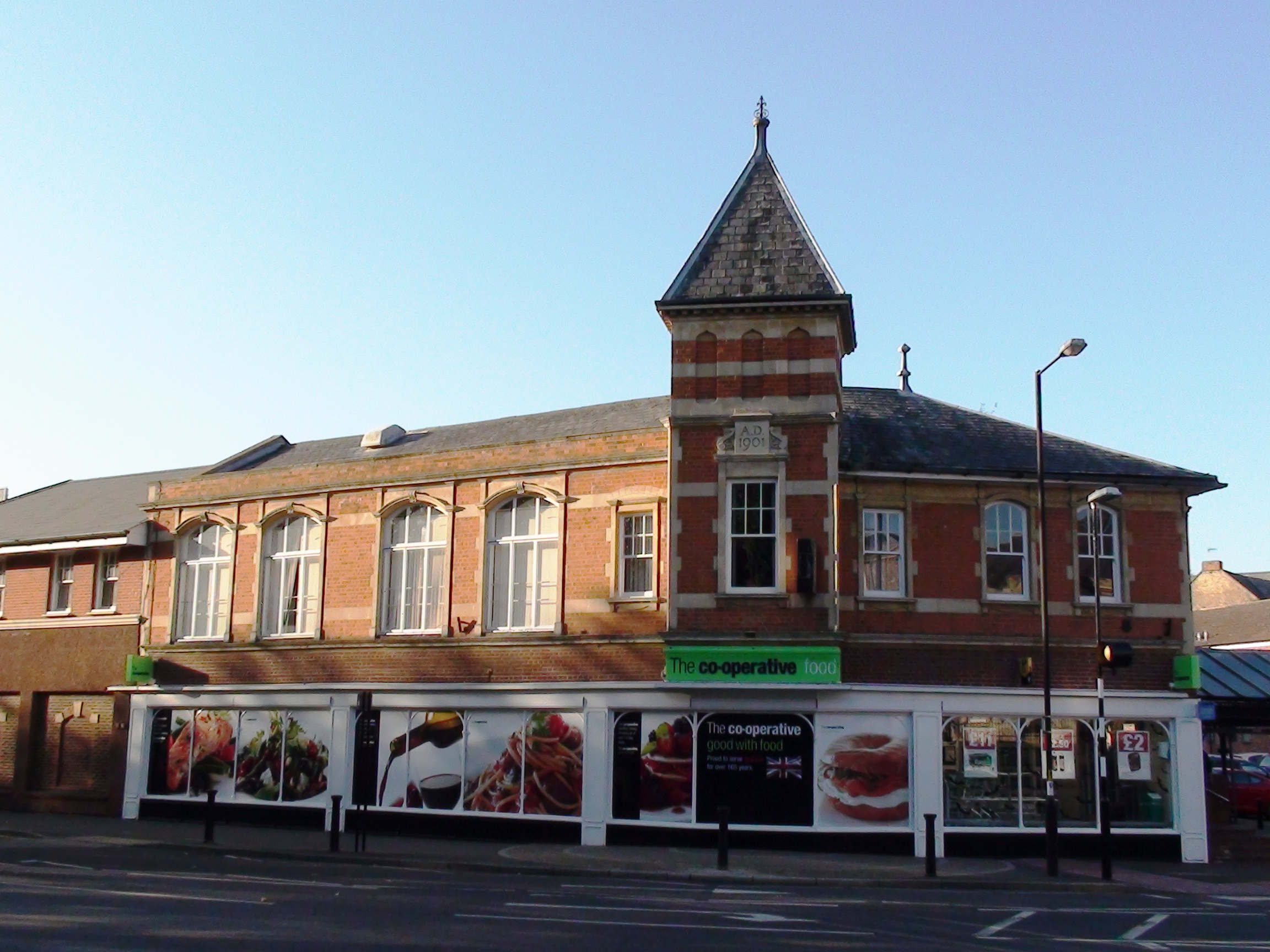
Raunds Co-operative Society Limited was a consumers' co-operative society based in Raunds, Northamptonshire, founded in 1891.

A consumers' co-operative is an enterprise owned by consumers and managed democratically and that aims at fulfilling the needs and aspirations of its members. Such co-operatives operate within the market system, independently of the state, as a form of mutual aid, oriented toward service rather than pecuniary profit. Many co-operatives, however, do have a degree of profit orientation. Just like other corporations, some co-operatives issue dividends to owners based on a share of total net profit or earnings (all owners typically receive the same amount); or based on a percentage of the total amount of purchases made by the owner. Regardless of whether they issue a dividend or not, most consumers' co-operatives will offer owners discounts and preferential access to goods and services.

Consumers' co-operatives often take the form of retail outlets owned and operated by their consumers, such as food co-ops. However, there are many types of consumers' co-operatives, operating in areas such as health care, insurance, housing, utilities and personal finance (including credit unions).

In some countries, consumers' co-operatives are known as co-operative retail societies or retail co-ops, though they should not be confused with retailers' co-operatives, whose members are retailers rather than consumers.

Consumers' co-operatives may, in turn, form co-operative federations. These may come in the form of co-operative wholesale societies, through which consumers' co-operatives collectively purchase goods at wholesale prices and, in some cases, own factories. Alternatively, they may be members of co-operative unions.

Consumer co-operation has been a focus of study in the field of co-operative economics.

== History ==
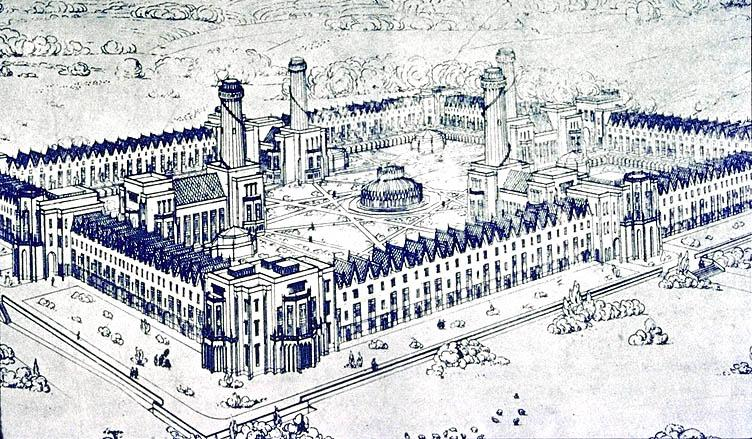
Model of Robert Owen's visionary project for a co-operative settlement. Owenites fired bricks to build it, but construction never took place.

Consumers' co-operatives rose to prominence during the Industrial Revolution as part of the labour movement. As employment moved to industrial areas and job sectors declined, workers began organizing and controlling businesses for themselves. Worker co-operatives were originally sparked by "critical reaction to industrial capitalism and the excesses of the industrial revolution." The formation of some workers co-operatives was meant to "cope with the evils of unbridled capitalism and the insecurities of wage labor."

The first documented consumers' co-operative was founded in 1769, in a barely-furnished cottage in Fenwick, East Ayrshire, when local weavers manhandled a sack of oatmeal into John Walker's whitewashed front room and began selling the contents at a discount, forming the Fenwick Weavers' Society.

In the decades that followed, several co-operatives or co-operative societies formed including Lennoxtown Friendly Victualling Society, founded in 1812.

The philosophy that underpinned the co-operative movement stemmed from such socialist writers as Robert Owen and Charles Fourier. Robert Owen, a key figure in the nascent co-operative movement, made his fortune in the cotton trade, but believed in putting his workers in a good environment with access to education for themselves and their children. These ideas were put into effect successfully in the cotton mills of New Lanark, Scotland, where the first co-operative store was opened. Spurred on by this success, Owen had the idea of forming "villages of co-operation" where workers would drag themselves out of poverty by growing their own food, making their own clothes, and ultimately becoming self-governing. He tried to form such communities in Orbiston, Scotland and in New Harmony, Indiana in the United States of America, but both communities failed.

Similar early experiments were made in the early 19th century and by 1830 there were several hundred co-operatives. William King made Owen's ideas more workable and practical. He believed in starting small, and realized that the working classes would need to set up co-operatives for themselves, so he saw his role as one of instruction. He founded a monthly periodical called The Co-operator, the first edition of which appeared on 1 May 1828. It gave a mixture of co-operative philosophy and practical advice about running a shop using co-operative principles.

=== Modern movement ===
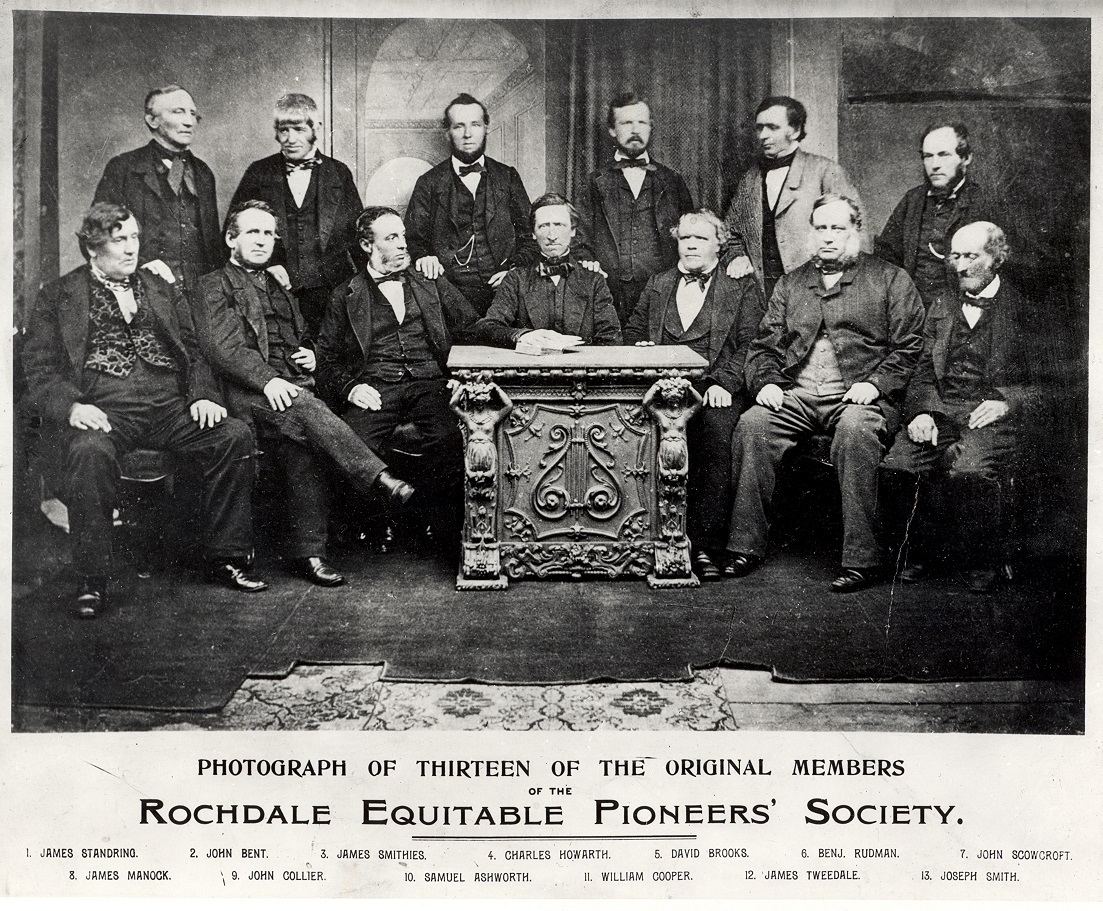
The Rochdale Society of Equitable Pioneers was established in 1844 and defined the modern co-operative movement.

The first successful co-operative was the Rochdale Society of Equitable Pioneers, established in England in 1844. This became the basis for the development and growth of the modern co-operative movement. As the mechanization of the Industrial Revolution forced more skilled workers into poverty, these tradesmen decided to band together to open their own store selling food items they could not otherwise afford.

With lessons from prior failed attempts at co-operation in mind, they designed the now-famous Rochdale Principles, and over a period of four months they struggled to pool one pound sterling per person for a total of 28 pounds of capital. On December 21, 1844, they opened their store with a very meagre selection of butter, sugar, flour, oatmeal and a few candles. Within three months, they expanded their selection to include tea and tobacco, and they were soon known for providing high quality, unadulterated goods.

The Co-operative Group formed gradually over 140 years from the merger of many independent retail societies, and their wholesale societies and federations. In 1863, twenty years after the Rochdale Pioneers opened their co-operative, the North of England Co-operative Society was launched by 300 individual co-ops across Yorkshire and Lancashire. By 1872, it had become known as the Co-operative Wholesale Society (CWS). Through the 20th century, smaller societies merged with CWS, such as the Scottish Co-operative Wholesale Society (1973) and the South Suburban Co-operative Society (1984).

== Governance and operation ==
Consumers' co-operatives utilize the co-operative principle of democratic member control, or one member/one vote. Most consumers' co-operatives have a board of directors elected by and from the membership. The board is usually responsible for hiring management and ensuring that the co-operative meets its goals, both financial and otherwise. Democratic functions, such as petitioning or recall of board members, may be codified in the bylaws or organizing document of the co-operative. Most consumers' co-operatives hold regular membership meetings (often once a year). As mutually owned businesses, each member of a society has a shareholding equal to the sum they paid in when they joined.

Large consumers' co-ops are run much like any other business and require workers, managers, clerks, products, and customers to keep the doors open and the business running. In smaller businesses the consumer/owners are often workers as well. Consumers' co-operatives can differ greatly in start up and also in how the co-op is run but to be true to the consumers' co-operative form of business the enterprise should follow the Rochdale Principles.

== Finance and approach to capital accumulation ==
The customers or consumers of the goods and services provided by a co-operative are often also the individuals who supply the capital necessary to establish or acquire the enterprise.

The primary distinction between consumers' co-operatives and other forms of business is that a consumers' co-operative aims to offer quality goods and services at the lowest possible cost to its consumer‑owners, rather than maximizing profits by charging the highest price the market will bear. In practice, consumers' co-operatives typically set prices at competitive market rates.

Unlike for-profit enterprises, which treat the margin between cost and selling price as profit for shareholders, consumers' co-operatives may use this surplus to build collectively owned capital, support member-defined social objectives, or return the excess to consumer‑owners as a patronage refund or dividend. Accumulated capital may be retained as reserves, reinvested in the co-operative’s growth, or used to acquire assets such as facilities or equipment.

While some claim that surplus payment returns to consumer/owner patrons should be taxed the same as dividends paid to corporate stock holders, others argue that consumers' co-operatives do not return a profit by traditional definition, and similar tax standards do not apply.

== Problems ==
Since consumers' co-operatives are run democratically, they are subject to the same problems typical of democratic government. Such difficulties can be mitigated by frequently providing member/owners with reliable educational materials regarding current business conditions. In addition, because a consumers' co-operative is owned by the users of a good or service as opposed to the producers of that good or service, the same sorts of labor issues may arise between the workers and the co-operative as would appear in any other company, as has materialized in the case of labor disputes at retail cooperative REI. This is one critique of consumers' co-operatives in favor of worker co-operatives.

== Pursuit of social goals ==
January 1947 Co-op Magazine back cover designed as a promotional poster

Many advocates of the formation of consumers' co-operatives—from a variety of political perspectives—have seen them as integral to the achievement of wider social goals.

For example, the founding document of the Rochdale Pioneers, who established one of the earliest consumers' co-operatives in England in 1844, expressed a vision that went far beyond the simple shop with which they began:

That as soon as practicable, this society shall proceed to arrange the powers of production, distribution, education, and government, or in other words to establish a selfsupporting home-colony of united interests, or assist other societies in establishing such colonies.

Co-operative Federalists, a term coined in the writings of Beatrice Webb, advocated forming federations of consumers' co-operatives as a means to achieve social reform. They believed such a development would bring benefits such as economic democracy and justice, transparency, greater product purity, and financial benefits for consumers.

== Examples ==
=== Europe ===
One of the world's largest consumers' co-operative federations operates in the UK as The Co-op, which operates over 5,500 branches of 'Co-op' branded business including Co-op Food (the UK's sixth largest supermarket chain), Co-op Funeralcare, Co-op Travel, Co-op Legal Services, and Co-op Electrical. The Co-operative Group is by far the largest of these businesses, itself having over 4,500 outlets and operating the collective buying group.

In Switzerland, the two largest supermarket chains Coop and Migros are both co-operatives and are among the country’s largest employers.

In Ireland, the Dublin Food Coop has been in operation since 1983.

In Scandinavia, the national co-operatives of Norway, Sweden, and Denmark joined as Coop Norden in January 2002, but separated again in 2008.

In Italy, the Coop Italia chain formed by many sub-cooperatives controlled 17.7% of the grocery market in 2005.

In Finland, the S Group is owned by 22 regional co-operatives and 19 local co-operative stores, which in turn are owned by their customers. In 2005 the S Group overtook its nearest rival Kesko Oyj with a 36% share of retail grocery sales compared to Kesko's 28%.

In France, Coop Atlantique owns 7 hypermarkets, 39 supermarkets, and about 200 convenience stores.

In Germany, the ReWe Group is a diversified holding company of consumers' co-operatives that includes thousands of retail stores, discount stores, and tourism agencies. It ranks as the second largest supermarket chain in Germany and in the top ten co-operative groups in the world.

In Spain, Eroski is a supermarket chain within Mondragón Corporación Cooperativa. As a worker-consumer hybrid, some of the personnel are hired workers and some are owner-workers. The owners include workers and mere consumers, but buying is open to everybody. It has franchises under the brand Aliprox not owned by Eroski but sharing its product range. Its origin is in the Basque Country. In its process of expansion, it merged with the Valencia-based co-operative Consum, but the merger dissolved in 2005. It has expanded across Spain and entered France and Gibraltar. After the Spanish crisis of 2008, Eroski sold several of its supermarkets and hypermarkets.

=== Australia ===
The Co-op Bookshop sold textbooks both online and on university campuses. It also owned Australian Geographic. In 2020 its retail stores closed and its online store was sold to Booktopia.

The Wine Society (Australian Wine Consumers’ Co-operative Society Limited), established in 1946, now has more than 58,000 members. It sources and sells premium wines under the Society label, runs comprehensive wine education courses, and recognises excellence from young winemakers.

Bank Australia was formed in 2011 as the Members and Education Credit Union. It changed its name to Bank Australia in 2015. The bank is wholly owned by its customers, reported at 125,000 in 2012.

=== Japan ===
Japan has a large and well developed consumers' co-operative movement with more than 14 million members. Retail co-ops alone had a combined turnover of 2.5 trillion Yen (21 billion U.S. Dollars) in April, 2003. Co-op Kobe (コープこうべ) in Hyōgo Prefecture is the largest retail co-operative in Japan and, with more than 1.2 million members, is one of the largest co-operatives in the world. In addition to retail co-ops there are medical, housing, and insurance co-ops alongside institutional (workplace based) co-ops, co-ops for school teachers, and university-based co-ops.

Approximately one in five of all Japanese households belongs to a local retail co-op and 90% of all co-op members are women. Nearly six million households belong to one of the 1,788,000 Han groups. These consist of a group of five to ten members in a neighbourhood who place a combined weekly order which is then delivered by truck the following week. A strength of Japanese consumers' co-ops in recent years has been the growth of community supported agriculture in which fresh produce is sent direct to consumers from producers without going through the market.

Some of co-op organisations, for example, in Tokyo metropolis and Kanagawa prefecture, manage their local political parties from 1970's; generally names itself as the "Network Movement" ("Tokyo Seikatsusha (it means "Living Persons") Network", "Kanagawa Network Movement", and so on). They depend on consumers movement, feminism, regionalism, and prefer to anti-nuclear. These parties keep small but steady sections in prefecture and municipal assemblies.

=== North America ===
In the United States, the PCC (Puget Consumers Cooperative) Natural Markets in Seattle is the largest consumer-owned food co-operative. The National Cooperative Grocers Association maintains a food co-operative directory.

Seattle-based R.E.I., which specializes in outdoor sporting equipment, is the largest consumers' co-operative in the United States.

Outdoor retailer Mountain Equipment Co-op (MEC) in Canada was one of that country's major consumers' co-operatives. In the Canadian Prairie provinces as well as British Columbia, gas stations, lumberyards, and grocery stores can be found under the Co-Op brand.

All credit unions in the United States and Canada are financial co-operatives. Tim Worstall has called the Vanguard Group a customer-owned co-operative, since the owners of Vanguard funds are the funds' investors.

=== Caribbean ===
In Puerto Rico, several Supermercados Fam Coop operate.

== See also ==
- Food co-operative, a supermarket owned and operated by its consumers.
- Copyleft
- GNU General Public License
- Health food store
- Healthcare Co-operatives movement in India
- National Cooperative Business Association
- Open source
- Open-source hardware
- US Federation of Worker Cooperatives
