= Peter Marks =

Peter Marks may refer to:

- Peter Marks (businessman), English businessman and CEO
- Peter Marks (journalist), American journalist and theater critic
- Peter Marks (physician), American oncologist and medical researcher
