= Shirine Khoury-Haq =

British and Australian business executive (born 1971)

- Khoury-Haq in 2024
- Born: 1971 (age 54–55); Beirut, Lebanon
- Education: Australian National University; Ohio State University; University of the West of England
- Occupation: Business executive
- Known for: First female chief executive of The Co-operative Group
- Term: 2022–2026
- Predecessor: Steve Murrells
- Successor: Kate Allum (interim)

Shirine Khoury-Haq (born 1971) is a British and Australian business executive, who was chief executive officer of The Co-operative Group from 2022 to 2026, overseeing a period of transformation. She was the first female chief executive since the Co-op was founded in 1863. Prior to joining the Co-op in 2019, she was COO of Lloyd's of London.

== Early life and education ==
Khoury-Haq was born in Beirut, Lebanon to a Palestinian father and Turkish mother. Her father worked in the oil industry, so they lived in several countries growing up. She learned English, French, Spanish, and Portuguese, in addition to her native Turkish language.

She attended school in the United States and Brazil before completing high school in Australia. She obtained a BCom in accounting and economics from the ANU. She earned an MBA from Ohio State University. She is a US Certified Public Accountant. She has a postgraduate diploma in management an Honorary Doctorate from the University of the West of England in Bristol.

== Career ==
Early in her career, Khoury-Haq worked in finance and operations at McDonald's, and was responsible for improving sales and profitability at 160 restaurants. She then moved to IBM, and was based in the US for three years, followed by six years in the UK.

In 2007, she became group head of operations and UK chief operating officer at Catlin Group, which was then the largest syndicate and managing agent within Lloyd's of London. In 2014, she was appointed COO of Lloyd's of London, where she remained for five years, and implemented a programme to modernise the way that Lloyd's operates, by using technology and hiring people from outside the insurance industry.

Khoury-Haq also was a non-executive director of Persimmon Homes and Post Office.

=== The Co-operative Group ===
Khoury-Haq joined The Co-operative Group in August 2019, as chief financial officer and head of the life services division, which sells insurance and provides funeral care and legal services.

In May 2022, she was appointed interim CEO following the departure of Steve Murrells, becoming the group's first female CEO in its 159-year history. She was confirmed as permanent CEO in August 2022. Khoury-Haq is one of only a handful of women CEOs leading FTSE 100 or equivalent businesses in the UK. She earns an annual salary of £750,000, plus a bonus, bringing her total remuneration to over £1 million in recent years. Between 2022 and 2024, Khoury-Haq led a turnaround of the Co-op, during which group debt fell by 94%, pre-tax profits rose by 475%, online sales grew by 46%, and membership increased by 22% to 6.2 million. Co-op Legal Services also invested in artificial intelligence to accelerate probate administration, enabling cases to be resolved more quickly.

In 2025, Khoury-Haq led the organisation through a malicious cyber attack in which an attempt to deploy malware was thwarted but the data of 6.5 million members was stolen. An open letter from Khoury-Haq was featured in the National Cyber Security Centre (NCSC) 2025 annual review. Following the attack, the Co-op Group reported a pre-tax loss of £126 million for the 2025 financial year. Over the same period, membership grew by 17% to 7.2 million and quick commerce grew by 15%. By the first quarter of 2026, every business in the Co-op portfolio had regained or exceeded its pre-cyber attack market share. In 2025, Co-op reported that security technology and police partnerships contributed to a 21% reduction in retail crime across its estate and a fall of more than 30% in assaults on colleagues.

On 26 March 2026, the Co-op announced that Khoury-Haq would step down as CEO. The announcement followed BBC News reporting of an alleged "toxic culture" among the group's senior leadership. The Co-operative Group responded to allegations reported by BBC News and stated that claims did not reflect the views of its leadership or workforce.

== Public activities ==
Khoury-Haq has participated in government and advisory initiatives. She co-chaired the UK Government's Net Zero Council under both Conservative and Labour governments, was on the UK Government's Women's Business Council, and participated in the Royal Foundation's Early Childhood Business Taskforce.

In 2024, Khoury-Haq was included in the Kindness & Leadership “50 Leading Lights UK” list. In 2025 she was ranked first in PR Week's UK Business Communicators of the Year and placed at the top of INvolve's HEROes global list for breaking down barriers for women. The list had reach across 60 countries. In the same year, she received an honorary doctorate from the University of the West of England.

== Personal life ==
Khoury-Haq has twin daughters. In 2022, she told The Sunday Times that each of her children would receive a single Christmas gift in solidarity with people experiencing financial difficulties. She lives in Cheshire, England.
