= The Co-operative Motor Group =

- Company type: Business of a consumer co-operative
- Industry: Retail
- Founded: 2005
- Defunct: 2015
- Products: Car dealership
- Parent: The Co-operative Group

The Co-operative Motor Group was the trading name of Co-operative Group Motors Limited, a wholly owned subsidiary of The Co-operative Group. Farnell Land Rover was the trading name of Albert Farnell Limited, a sister company. Both head offices were in Media House, Bradford.

== History ==
In June 2005, the Society sold Priory Motor Group, its motor car dealership business. Reg Vardy purchased the majority of dealerships in the North East region. In October 2009, however, following merger with United Co-operatives, The Co-operative Group inherited Sunwin Motors, which it rebranded as The Co-operative Motor Group.

=== Central England Co-operative ===
In May 2013, following the disposal of Albert Farnell and its last remaining dealerships, The Co-operative Motor Group ceased trading. However, Central England Co-operative continued to operate dealerships, in Lincoln (formerly Advantage Motor Group) and Loughborough (Empress Road Garage Services) under The Co-operative Motor Group name. This was until they were sold in 2015.
