= Farmcare =

British farming organisation

Farmcare Trading Limited
- Trade name: Farmcare
- Company type: Subsidiary
- Industry: Farming; Wholesale
- Founded: 1896
- Headquarters: England and Scotland
- Key people: Richard Quinn (Chief executive)
- Products: Food
- Number of employees: 240
- Parent: Wellcome Trust
- Website: farmcareltd.com

Farmcare was part of the Co-operative Group from 1896 to 2014.

Farmcare Trading Limited, trading as Farmcare, is the largest lowland farming organisation in the United Kingdom. Farmcare traded as The Co-operative Farms while a subsidiary of The Co-operative Group until it was sold to the Wellcome Trust in 2014. Wellcome decided to cease farming activities in 2017 and instead form partnerships with farmers.

== History ==
=== The Co-operative Farms ===
The first farm was acquired at Roden, Shropshire in 1896 in order to supply potatoes to local societies' stores. By 1918, the then Co-operative Wholesale Society already farmed a total of 32,648 acres (13,212 ha) across England.

Following the merger of CWS and Co-operative Retail Services in 2001, CWS Agriculture became Farmcare Limited. It was rebranded as The Co-operative Farms in 2007.

=== Wellcome Trust ===
On 4 August 2014, the business was sold to the Wellcome Trust for £249 million, to reduce The Co-operative Group's debt following its financial crisis in 2013. At the time of the sale, The Co-operative Farms owned 39,533 acres (15,998 ha) of land organised as 15 farms, and more than 100 residential and 27 commercial properties.

In 2017, Wellcome announced that they would cease farming activities and instead formed 12 partnerships with farmers and farming contractors.

== See also ==
- Associated Co-operative Creameries
