= Martin Beaumont =

British businessman (born 1949)

Martin Dudley Beaumont CVO (born 6 August 1949) is a British businessman who was, until October 2007, the chief executive of the Co-operative group, today a £9.4 billion turnover enterprise employing in excess of 85,000 people across a diverse portfolio of businesses.

== Early life ==
He attended Magdalene College, Cambridge, where he studied Land Economy.

== Career ==
During his tenure, he continued extensive restructuring and modernisation of the group - which spans food stores, funerals, pharmacies and financial services. In particular, he reshaped the portfolio of businesses, implemented a strategy to rejuvenate the brand and reintroduced the Coop dividend.

From 1992 for ten years he was CEO of United Cooperatives where he grew turnover to £1.3 billion, overseeing the expansion of its trading base and a consistent growth in profits. He was also deputy chairman of The Co-operative Bank. A Cambridge University graduate, Martin Beaumont spent the first 16 years of his career with KPMG, becoming a partner with general practice and management consultancy responsibilities.

Amongst several non-executive and advisory roles, he is chairman of the UK Retail skills council Skillsmart since 2007. He is also Chairman of Chester Races and Kind Consumer

== Personal life ==
He married Andrea Wilberforce in 1976, and they have three daughters.

Beaumont was appointed by Her Majesty The Queen as High Sheriff of Cheshire for the Shrieval Year 2013/2014

He was appointed Commander of the Royal Victorian Order (CVO) in the 2017 Birthday Honours for his services as a member of the Duchy of Lancaster Council.

Business positions
Preceded by New company	Chief Executive of The Co-operative Group; 2002 - October 2007	Succeeded by Peter Marks
Preceded by	Chief Executive of United Co-operatives; 1992 - 2002	Succeeded by Defunct company
Preceded by	Finance Director of United Co-operatives; 1990 - 1992	Succeeded by
