= Co-op Legal Services =

Law firms of England

- Type: Subsidiary undertaking
- Industry: Legal services
- Founded: 2006
- Headquarters: Manchester, United Kingdom
- Area served: United Kingdom
- Key people: Caoilionn Hurley (Managing Director); Daniel Comerford (Consumer Services Lead); James Antoniou (Head of Wills); Chis Dingley (Head of Commercial and Customer - Probate); Alex Crate (Head of Commercial and Customer - Estate Planning)
- Number of employees: 800 (approx.)
- Parent: The Co-op Group
- Website: www.co-oplegalservices.co.uk

Co-op Legal Services offers legal advice, and provides legal services for Family Law, Divorce, Will Writing, Conveyancing, Employment Law, Probate and Personal Injury.

Co-op Legal Services is a subsidiary of The Co-operative Group in the United Kingdom. It was established in 2006 and employs over 800 staff in Manchester, London, Bristol and Sheffield. It has its head office in Manchester.

== History ==
2006 – Established as a member only business offering Personal Injury and Legal Advisory Services.

2007 – Legal services expanded to include Will Writing, Conveyancing, Probate and Estate Administration.

2011 – Co-op Legal Services began developing a family law service led by Christina Blacklaws and Jenny Beck, then partners at London law firm TV Edwards.

2012 – Received approval from the Solicitors Regulation Authority (SRA) to become an Alternative Business Structure (ABS) under the 2007 Legal Services Act.

2012 – Legal services expanded to include Family Law and Employment Law services.

2014 – Recognised by Remember A Charity as the first corporate organisation to raise £15 million in potential charitable legacies through its Will writing services.

2016 – Acquired Sheffield-based Collective Legal Solutions.

2016 – Launched Co-op Estate Planning offering legal, funeral and inheritance plans in a customer's own home, for residents of England and Wales.

2018 - Winner of Probate Provider and Will Writing Firm (National) of the Year - The British Wills and Probate Awards

== Co-op values ==
Co-op Legal Services is part of the Co-op Group, one of the UK's largest mutual businesses. That means that any profits are invested back into the business to improve the service offered to its clients.

== Co-op membership ==
In 2016, The Co-op launched its Join Us campaign offering Co-op Group members a 5% reward when they purchase Co-op branded products and services, with a further 1% going to local causes.
