= Jo Whitfield =

Joanne Louise Whitfield CBE (born 21 December 1968) is a non-executive director at Asda. She was the chief executive of Matalan from 2023 to 2024.

== Early life ==
She was born in St Helens, then in Lancashire.

She took A-levels (including English Literature and politics) at Widnes Sixth Form College (now Riverside College, Halton).

She attended Aston University from 1987 to 1991, studying management.

== Career ==
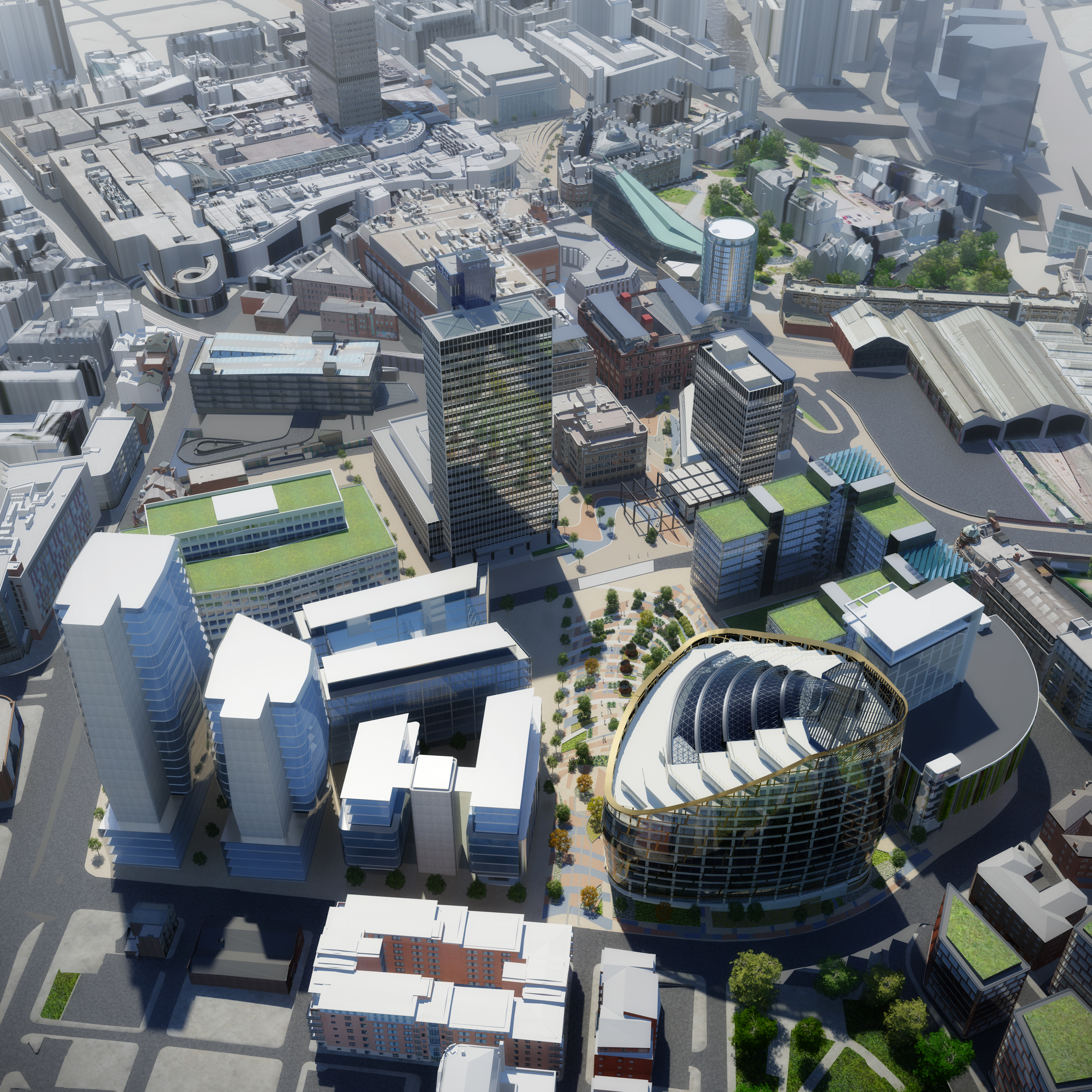
Overview of new Co-op headquarters (One Angel Square) at N.O.M.A., Manchester

=== Northern Foods ===
She worked for Northern Foods from 1995 to 2000.

=== Matalan ===
She worked for Matalan from 2002 to 2008.

She re-joined Matalan as chief executive Oofficer from March 2023 until October 2024.

=== Asda ===
She joined Asda in July 2008. She rejoined Asda as a non-executive director in February 2025 after eight years.

=== Co-op ===
She joined the Co-op in April 2016 as finance director for Co-op Food and Retail. She became Chief Executive of Co-op Food in March 2017, making her the first female CEO of a British food retailer. In 2019, she received the Veuve Clicquot businesswoman of the year award for her work on improving the stores' sales and sustainable practices.

Whitfield was appointed Commander of the Order of the British Empire (CBE) in the 2021 New Year Honours for services to retail and the food supply chain during the COVID-19 response.

== Personal life ==
She lives in Trafford borough, in Altrincham. She married in April 2003 in Manchester.

Business positions
Preceded by Steve Murrells	Chief Executive of Co-op Food; March 2017 -	Succeeded by
Preceded by	Finance Director of Co-op Food; April 2016 - March 2017	Succeeded by
