= Co-op Funeralcare =

British funeral home chain

Funeral Services Limited

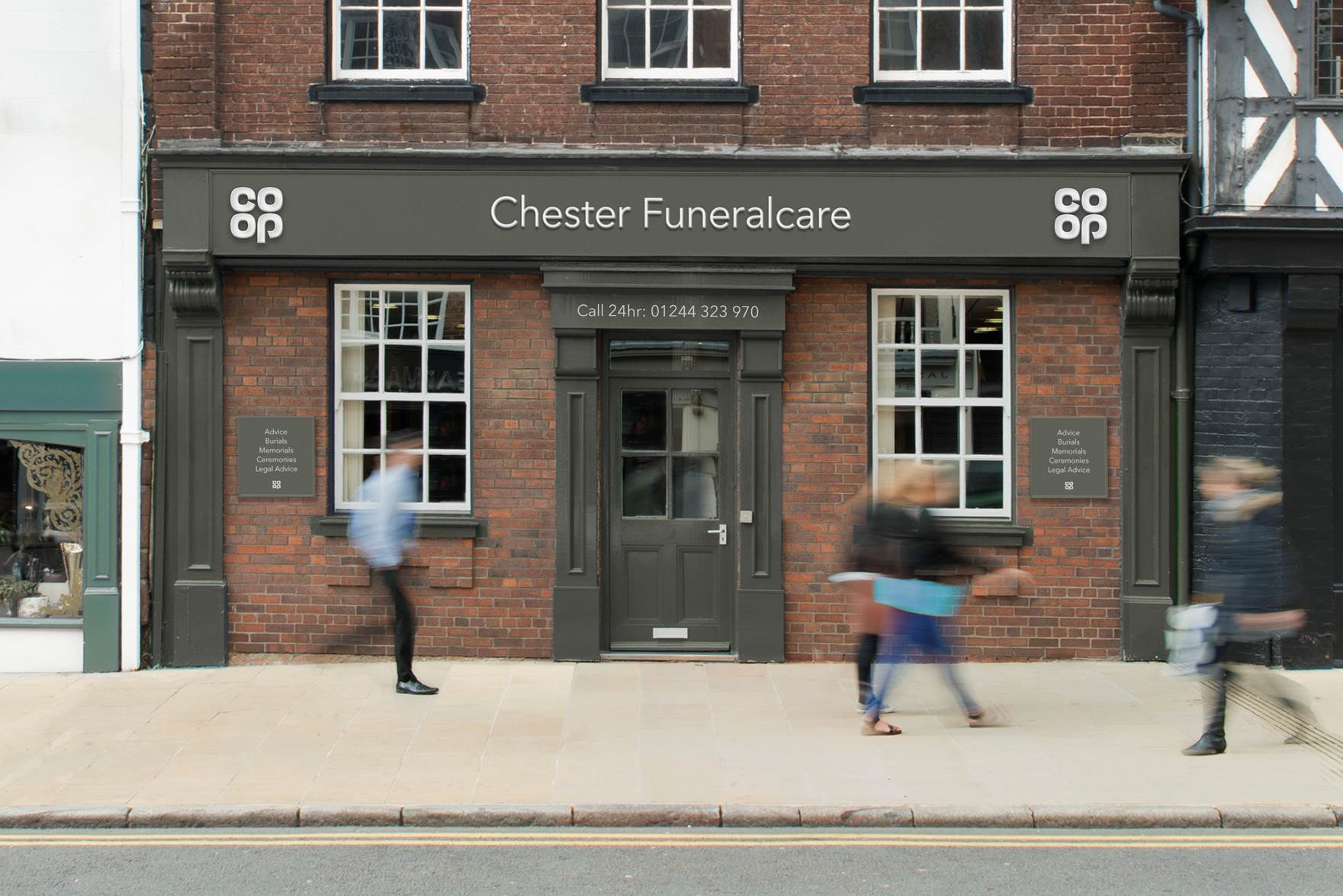
- The Co-op's Chester funeral home
- Company type: Subsidiary undertaking
- Industry: Funeral Services
- Products: Funerals & Memorials
- Parent: The Co-operative Group
- Website: coop.co.uk/funeralcare

Funeral Services Limited, trading as Co-op Funeralcare, is a wholly owned subsidiary of The Co-operative Group, based in Manchester, which operates over 1,000 funeral homes and is the largest funeral director in the United Kingdom, accounting for 16.5% of the "at need" funeral market during 2016. Co-op Funeralcare is a member of the National Association of Funeral Directors.

In addition to its funeral home operations, the business also operates repatriation services; crematoria and cemeteries; woodland burial grounds; a memorial masonry manufacturing facility and a coffin factory and workshop.

Other co-operative societies such as Midcounties Co-operative use the previous The Co-operative Funeralcare for their businesses.

== Operations ==
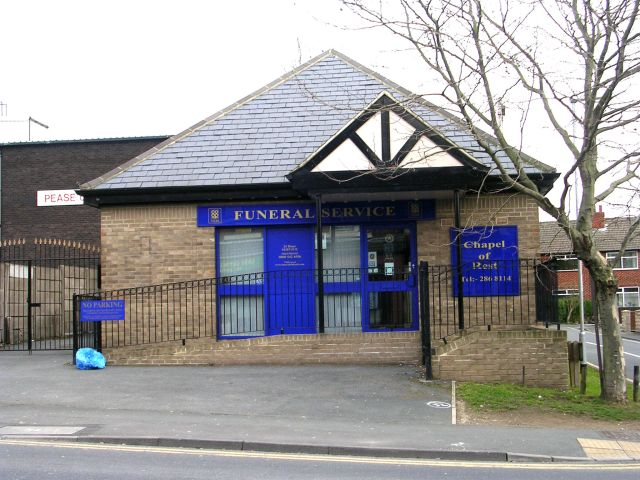
Co-op Funeralcare home in Garforth.

As a funeral director, Co-op Funeralcare arranges all aspects of a funeral service including transport, flowers, catering, obituaries and orders of service, liaising with the relevant officiants. The business caters for all cultures, faiths and beliefs and their services are available 24 hours a day, 7 days a week. Funeralcare also provide a range of funeral plans which allow people to plan and prepare for their funeral in advance. The Co-operative Funeralcare operates all of its funeral homes according to a strict NAFD code of practice, which ensures clients’ rights are properly protected. Employees are encouraged to take a BTEC vocational qualification in funeral directing, which Co-op Funeralcare helped to set up.

Co-op Funeralcare is a national UK funeral director brand and, in 2009, it was the first funeral director to launch a national television advertising campaign. In addition to its Co-op branded funeral homes, Funeralcare also operate a number of private name funeral homes. These businesses have been purchased from independent funeral directors and continue to operate under the family name to maintain high levels of profitability.

=== Facilities ===
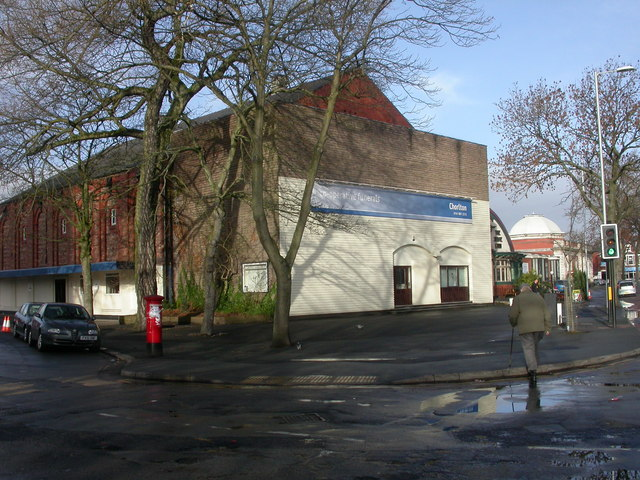
The Chorlton-cum-Hardy Co-op funeral directors; in a former cinema

Co-op Funeralcare operated Grenoside crematorium in Sheffield, Craigton crematorium in Glasgow, Stockport cemetery and crematorium in Greater Manchester, Emstrey cemetery and crematorium in Shropshire and Lichfield & District crematorium in Staffordshire. These were sold to Dignity in 2016.

Co-op Funeralcare also operated Hinton Park, Poole and Wimbourne woodland burial parks in Dorset and Mayfields remembrance park in the Wirral, Merseyside under the Woodland Burials trading name until these were sold to Southern Co-Operatives.

Co-op Funeralcare's coffin factory and workshop is the largest in the UK, producing over 100,000 coffins every year and supplying its funeral home network with its core range. The business sells memorial masonry throughout the funeral home network and manufactures headstones at a manufacturing facility in Glasgow, Scotland.

=== Membership ===
Members of The Co-operative Group and participating regional societies earn membership points on funeral and memorial masonry plans. Points are converted into dividend at a rate agreed annually by the Board.

A number of regional co-operatives such as the Central England Co-operative and the Midcounties Co-operative also operate funeral homes under "The co-operative funeralcare" brand, though these are operated and managed independently.
