= Steve Murrells =

British businessman (born 1965)

Steven Murrells CBE
- Born: Steven Geoffrey Murrells; 3 August 1965 (age 61); Colchester, Essex, England
- Occupation: Businessman
- Years active: 2012–present
- Employer: The Co-operative Group
- Title: Former CEO, Co-operative Group
- Term: 1 March 2017 – August 2022
- Board member of: The Co-operative Group

Steven Geoffrey Murrells, CBE (born 3 August 1965) is a British businessman, the former chief executive of The Co-operative Group.

== Career ==
Murrells became chief executive of Co-operative Retail in July 2012.

He became chief executive of The Co-operative Group in 2017. The Guardian reported that Murrells was paid a £2.2 million bonus in 2020.

Murrells was appointed Commander of the Order of the British Empire (CBE) in the 2022 New Year Honours for services to the food supply chain.

In May 2022, it was announced that he would be succeeded as CEO by Shirine Khoury-Haq.

Business positions
Preceded by vacant	Chief Executive of The Co-operative Group; 2017–2022	Succeeded by Shirine Khoury-Haq
Preceded by Tim Hurrell	Chief Executive of Co-op Food; 2012–2017	Succeeded by Jo Whitfield
