= Associated Co-operative Creameries =

Associated Co-operative Creameries (ACC), formerly CWS Milk Group, was a subsidiary and operating division of the Co-operative Group.

Associated Co-operative Creameries Limited is an industrial and provident society that was first registered in 1961, and became a subsidiary of the North Eastern Co-operative Society (NECS), a large regional consumer co-operative based in Gateshead. It became one of the largest milk processors and distributors in north-east England. After NECS merged with the Co-operative Wholesale Society (CWS, now the Co-operative Group) in 1992, Associated Co-operative Creameries absorbed CWS Milk Group, a milk processor and distributor based in Wales and north west England. The abbreviated trading name ACC was adopted in 2001 when the milk and distribution operations were split.

By 2004, Associated Co-operative Creameries Limited, trading as ACC Milk, was the UK's fourth largest dairy business, when it was sold to yet another co-operative, Dairy Farmers of Britain of Nantwich, Cheshire, forming Britain's largest milk co-operative, and the UK's third largest milk processor. ACC moved its registered address to Nantwich at that time.

ACC Distribution was the logistics division of The Co-operative Group and supplied not only stores belonging to The Co-operative Group itself but other co-operative societies. ACC Distribution is still owned by the Co-operative Group and is today known as Co-operative Retail Logistics.
