= Peter Marks (businessman) =

British businessman

- Born: Peter Vincent Marks; Bradford, West Yorkshire, England
- Citizenship: United Kingdom
- Education: St. Bede's Grammar School
- Occupation: Businessman
- Years active: 1967–present
- Title: Former CEO of The Co-operative Group (2000–2013)
- Spouse: Julia Law (m. 1971)
- Children: 2

Peter Vincent Marks CBE is an English businessman, and the former chief executive of the member-owned retailer The Co-operative Group.

== Career ==
Marks became a management trainee in the food division of what became the Yorkshire Co-operatives. He was appointed Assistant Personnel Manager in 1974 and Personnel Manager in 1976.

In 1991, he was promoted to the position of Non-Food Trades Officer, responsible for the Department Stores, Funeral and Travel divisions in February 1996 the Food Division was added to his responsibilities. Later that year he was appointed Chief general manager (Retail). Marks then oversaw its disastrous takeover of Somerfield which culminated in the eventual disposal of 60% of stores.

=== Chief Executive ===
Appointed Deputy Chief Executive officer in 1999, Marks became Chief Executive in 2000. In September 2002 Yorkshire and United Norwest Co-operatives merged as United Co-operatives. In July 2007 United Co-operatives merged with the Co-operative Group and Marks became chief executive of the new merged organisation, replacing Martin Beaumont.

Until the merger, Marks was a director on the Co-operative Group board and is on the board of the Bradford Centre Regeneration Company. His basic salary in 2010 was £900,000, with a performance-related bonus of £449,000. His total emoluments in 2010 were £2,118,000, an increase of over 35% from the 2009 figure of £1,565,000.

He announced his retirement as chief executive of the Co-operative Group in August 2012, not long after negotiating the potential purchase of 632 branches ("Verde") from Lloyds Banking Group. It was the failure of this purchase that made public the extent of the losses the Co-operative bank had inherited through its merger with the former Britannia building society. This led in 2013 to a requirement to re-capitalise the Co-operative bank, causing the Co-operative Group to lose overall control of the bank by reducing their share from 100% to 20%.

In December 2012 it was announced that Marks was to be appointed Commander of the Order of the British Empire (CBE) in the 2013 New Year Honours for services to the retail trade.

== Personal life ==
He is a supporter of Bradford City Football Club.

Business positions
Preceded by Martin Beaumont	Chief Executive of The Co-operative Group; October 2007 –	Succeeded by
