= United Co-operatives =

Former consumer co-operative in the United Kingdom

United Co-operatives Limited
- Type: Consumer Co-operative
- Industry: Retail (Grocery), Travel agency, Retail (Vehicles), Services Group, Pharmacies, Funeral directors
- Founded: 1844; 182 years ago
- Defunct: 2007; 19 years ago
- Headquarters: Rochdale, United Kingdom
- Key people: Peter Marks, Chief Executive Officer
- Revenue: £9 billion
- Number of employees: 87,500
- Website: Official website at the Wayback Machine (archived January 7, 2007)

United Co-operatives Limited, or simply United Co-op, was a regional consumer co-operative in the United Kingdom, until its merger with the Co-operative Group in 2007. The society operated across Yorkshire, the North West and North Midlands of United Kingdom. In September 2002, it came about from the merger of United NorWest and Yorkshire Co-operative Society.

United Norwest, in turn, arose from a merger in 1991 between an earlier United Co-operative and the Norwest Pioneers, which had the Rochdale Pioneers as a direct predecessor. Rochdale Pioneers was the prototypical consumer co-operative, formed in 1844.

The original United Co-operative was founded in 1983 from a merger of the Greater Lancastria Society and several other societies. The Greater Lancastria itself formed in 1973 after a series of mergers of many societies in the north west of England.

The key businesses of the Society were food retailing, travel retail, car dealerships (Sunwin Motor Group), pharmacies and funerals. The underperforming non-food department stores, most of which were inherited via Yorkshire Co-operatives, were closed or sold-off. The former Normid chain of superstores was owned by the society.

United's pharmacies and food stores had a distinct logo, that was not to be confused with the Co-operative Group's own chain of pharmacies and food stores, which adopt a slightly different logo and fascia. However, after the merger former United sites adopted the new branding.

In September 2006, members voted for a merger with the smaller Sheffield Co-operative Society, giving United a greater presence in South Yorkshire. On 11 December 2006, members voted for a merger with Leeds Co-operative Society, which has similar statistics to Sheffield Co-op; this was confirmed with a second vote in January 2007. On 29 July 2007, the two completed the merger. Later in 2007, United Co-operatives merged with the Co-operative Group and ceased to exist as an independent society.

== Normid ==
Normid was the name the United Co-operatives used for their largest stores, located in Northern England. Normid superstores sold food, DIY products, electrical items and housed concessions such as Dolphin bathrooms. By the time of United's merger with the Co-operative Group, the business had decided to concentrate on smaller stores and supermarkets and planned to rebrand the remaining stores as 'The Co-operative Food'.

The flagship Normid store was at Burnden Park, Bolton, home of Bolton Wanderers Football Club and Normid was shirt sponsor of Bolton Wanderers from 1986 until 1990. However United Co-operatives objected legally to any development or modernisation of the stadium ultimately forcing Bolton Wanderers to move away from the site. The store closed in 1997, shortly after Bolton's move to the Reebok Stadium. The site was derelict for several years and demolished in 2001, to make way for a new retail park, including an Asda Superstore.

Other stores were located in Blackpool, Crewe, Wigan, Widnes, St Helens, Talke (near Kidsgrove), Chorley, Hindley and Blackburn. Normid 1 was based in Crewe, Normid 2 Burslem, Stoke-on-Trent, Normid 3 was Milehouse, Newcastle-under-Lyme. Normid 4 Tunstall, Stoke-on-Trent, Normid 5 was the Hypermarket at Talke. Normid 6 and 7 were Macclesfield and Longton, Stoke-On-Trent.
