= The Co-operative Group =

British group of retail businesses

Co-operative Group Limited

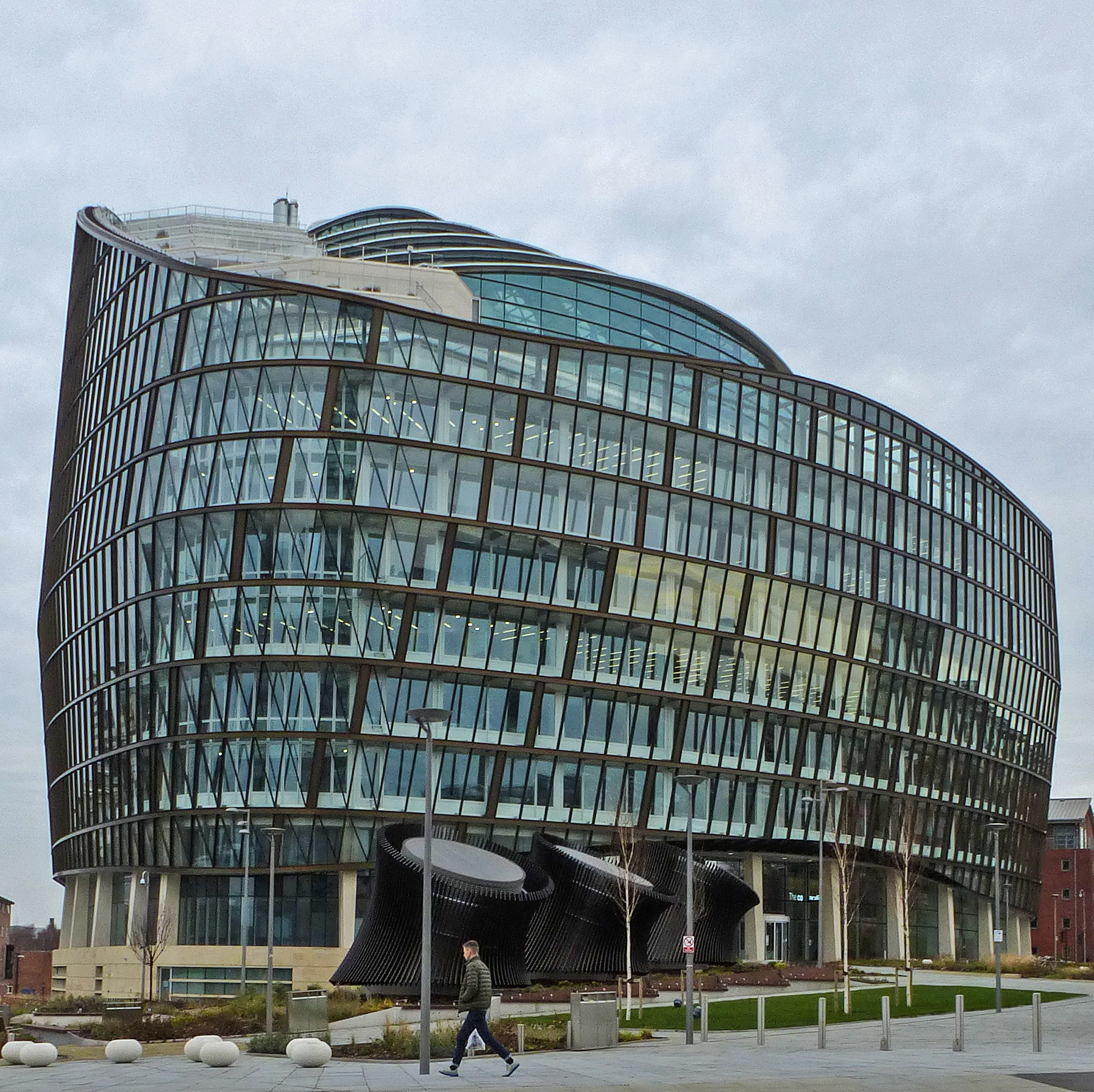
- One Angel Square; The Co-operative Group's headquarters in Manchester, England
- Trade name: Co-op
- Formerly: Co-operative Wholesale Society Limited; Co-operative Group (CWS) Limited
- Type: Consumer co-operative
- Industry: Retail (convenience stores), wholesale, legal, funerals, insurance, social enterprise
- Founded: 11 August 1863; 163 years ago in Manchester
- Headquarters: Manchester, England
- Number of locations: 3,160 (2023)
- Key people: Moni Mannings (Interim Chair); Kate Allum (Interim CEO)
- Services: Retail (convenience stores); Wholesale; Funerals; Legal; Insurance
- Revenue: ▼£11.3 billion (2023)
- Operating income: ▲£97 million (2023)
- Net income: ▼£3 million (2023)
- Members: ▲5 million active members (2023)
- Number of employees: 56,465 (2023)
- Subsidiaries: Co-op Wholesale Ltd.; Co-op Insurance Services Ltd.; Co-operative Legal Services Ltd.; Co-op Food; Plus 100+ more
- Website: co-operative.coop

Co-operative Group Limited, (Note: Formerly Co-operative Wholesale Society Limited, then Co-operative Group (CWS) Limited) trading as Co-op, is a British consumer co-operative with a group of retail businesses, including grocery retail and wholesale, legal services, funerals and insurance, Starbucks franchises, and social enterprise.

The group has its headquarters located at One Angel Square in Manchester, England. The Group also manages the Co-operative Federal Trading Services, formerly the Co-operative Retail Trading Group (CRTG).

== History ==
=== Beginnings (1844–1938) ===
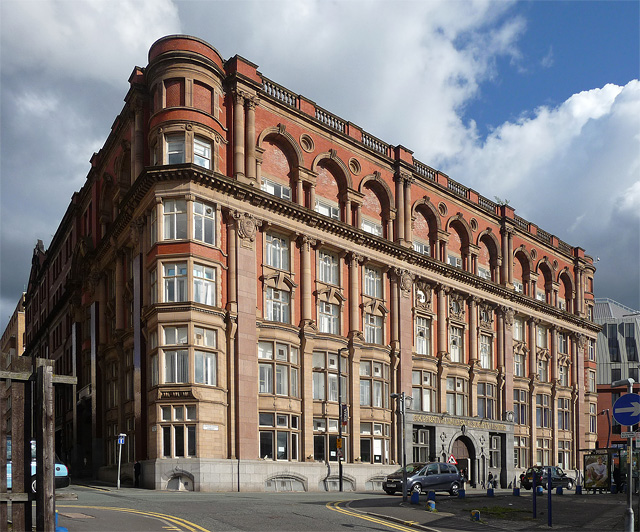
The Hanover Building in Manchester, former headquarters of the Co-operative Wholesale Society

The Co-operative Group has developed over the years from the merger of co-operative wholesale societies and many independent retail societies. The Group's roots are traced back to foundation of the movement in the UK and that of its oldest subscribing member society, the Rochdale Society of Equitable Pioneers, established in 1844. The Rochdale Society of Equitable Pioneers was based on the Rochdale Principles – which notably introduced the idea of distributing a share of profits according to purchases through a scheme which became known as the dividend or "Divi".

Although the Co-operative Group incorporates the original Rochdale Society, the business's core for much of its history were its wholesale operations. This began in 1863 when the North of England Co-operative Wholesale Industrial and Provident Society Limited was launched in Manchester by 300 individual co-operatives in Yorkshire and Lancashire. By 1872, it was known as the 'Co-operative Wholesale Society' (CWS) and it was wholly owned by the co-operatives which traded with it. The CWS grew rapidly and supplied produce to co-operative stores across England, though many co-ops only sourced around a third of their produce through the CWS. It was this continued and fierce competition with other non-co-operative wholesalers which led to the CWS becoming highly innovative. By 1890 the CWS had established significant branches in Leeds, Blackburn, Bristol, Nottingham and Huddersfield alongside a number of factories which produced biscuits (Manchester), boots (Leicester), soap (Durham) and textiles (Batley). In an attempt to drive down the significant cost of transportation for produce the CWS even began its own shipping line which initially sailed from Goole docks to parts of continental Europe. One of the CWS' steamships, the Pioneer, was the first commercial vessel to use the Manchester Ship Canal, a canal which the CWS part financed. This rapid expansion continued so that by the outbreak of World War I the CWS had major offices in the United States, Denmark, Canada and Australia and a tea plantation in India.

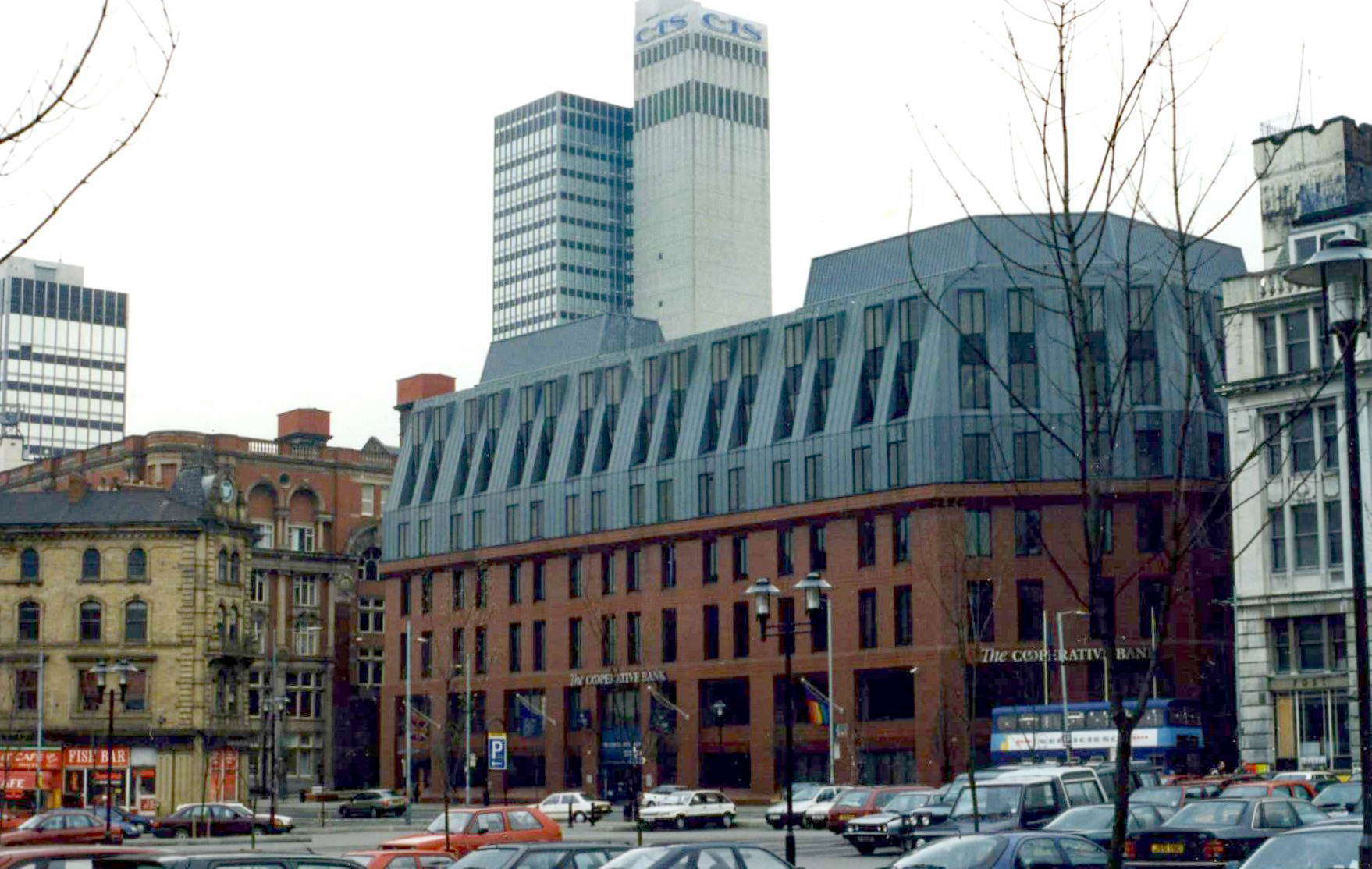
The head offices for the Co-operative Bank and the CIS in Manchester's 'co-op quarter'

There was a great deal of consideration on the role of the CWS in the British co-operative movement around the turn of the twentieth century. Many, fiercely local, societies saw the CWS as a valuable supplier but did not want to exclusively purchase produce from them owing to perceptions of high cost (mostly transport costs) and unreliable quality – some things the CWS were at pains to resolve. In contrast to this, the CWS had its aim to be the centrepoint for the whole co-operative movement in the UK and lobbied hard for loyalty from co-ops. To this end, they started to assist the local retail societies in more ways than simply as a wholesaler. The CWS Bank, the precursor to The Co-operative Bank, financed loans for societies to use for expansion through purchasing new buildings, land or new equipment. After the acquisition of the Co-operative Insurance Society in 1913, the CWS also provided insurance services to members and the CWS also began providing legal services – all businesses which influence the formation of the Co-operative Group today. It was hoped that these financial ties, as well as the CWS corporate dividend, would increase loyalty to the CWS.

=== World War II and post-war decline (1939–1989) ===
During the Second World War, rationing led to an effective pause in any major changes to the co-operative movement in the UK with the CWS becoming highly involved in sourcing overseas goods for UK consumers and manufacturing wartime goods.

During this time, the CWS began planning for the future, as even then they could see the potential disruption to the retail market that the new multiple grocers could have. What was less obvious at the time would be the impact of National Savings and national taxation on the movement, as Britain shifted from a country of friendly, building and co-operative societies, to one with a National Health Service, National House building programs and National Post Office Bank NS&I GPO. In 1944, the CWS published a report entitled Policy and Programme for Post War Development which focused on methods for revitalising the co-op movement after the war had ended. The report suggested merging the CWS with the Scottish Co-operative Wholesale Society (SCWS); reducing the number of co-operative societies through merger; moving into the manufacturing and production of white goods and the expansion of the Co-operative Bank.

This report received much criticism from the fiercely local co-operative societies and the proposals of the report were only partly and slowly implemented. The end of war allowed some attempt to modernise the co-operative stores around this time, while the slow demobilisation of the wartime boost of full employment and high wages partly waned consumer spending power. After the London Co-operative Society opened its first self-service shop in 1942, the co-operative movement led the way on the development of self-service stores to the point where, by the 1950s, 90% of self-service shops in the UK were run by co-operatives. Despite this the subscribed share capital (risk capital) available to societies to innovate and take risks dwindled causing market share and relative quality of the service societies could offer their members to dwindle. Consequently, this impacted the movement by reducing the number of society members willing to enter membership and then actively trade with their co-operatives, leading to further real terms falls in withdraw-able member share capital levels, and in the level or return generated co-operative investment in the form of lower interest and dividends. A corollary of falling market share was continued ownership of freehold land, property and infrastructure, such as warehouses, dairies and farmland (the Co-operative Farms) built up by societies with accumulated surpluses from the 50 years of growth before the war.

The Co-operative Independent Commission (1958) was tasked with investigating the decline in the co-op movement and for making recommendations for revitalising the movement in the future. Its recommendations had two main thrusts: that a strong response to the emerging multiple-store supermarket chains (including the appointment of professional managers) was needed and that the Co-op needed to come to terms with the rise in consumerism and to move away from its association with the "working poor" rather than a more prosperous working class.

The CWS responded with operation facelift in 1968 which introduced the first national co-operative branding, the 'Co-op' cloverleaf.

Though Operation Facelift led to some improvements, the movement (including the CWS) remained largely unreformed with its grocery market share continuing a downward trend. Again, it was suggested that societies merge to form regional societies to improve their competitiveness through enhanced economies of scale. Many local co-op societies strongly resisted such mergers but, as their financial situation declined, many were forced to merge to create regional societies or were absorbed into either the CRS or the SCWS to avoid failing. Consolidation within the movement was considerable, and in 1973 serious financial mismanagement of the SCWS Bank led to the SCWS and the CWS merging to form a single UK-wide wholesale society.

The merger did highlight the potential of The Co-operative Bank as it was building a sizeable base of customers (notably local authorities, mutuals and local groups alongside co-operative societies) and this became an increasingly significant proportion of the CWS's annual profits. The growth in the bank largely related to its aggressive expansion into the personal banking market and with the pioneering of free banking (1972) in the UK, nine years before any of its larger rivals.

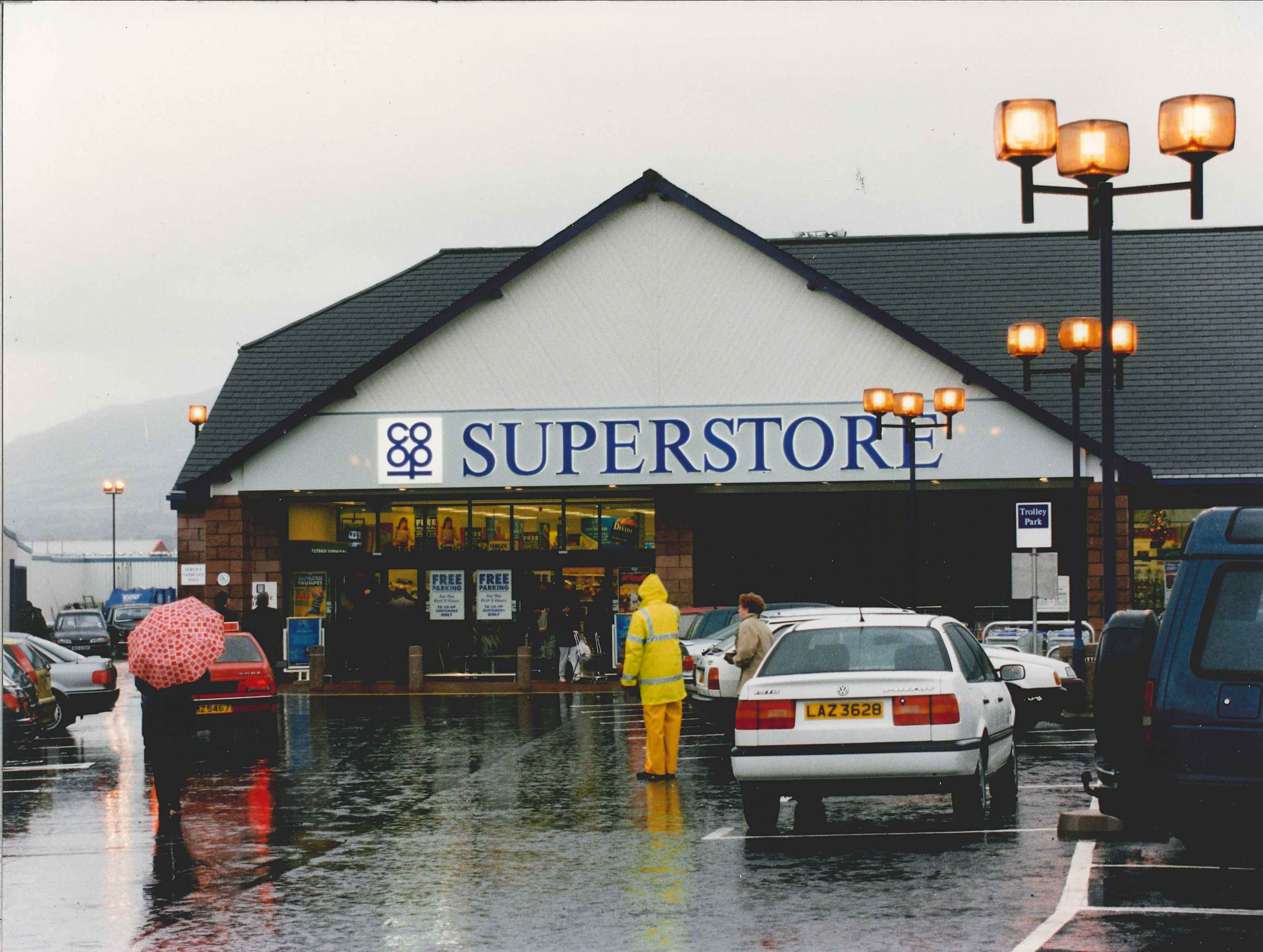
The Co-op superstore Lisburn Road, Belfast, shown here in 1996

The co-operative movement's marketshare and profitability continued to decline during the 1970s and 1980s, in part, due to a number of reasons.

Firstly, the process of deindustrialization, that had characterised the period led to serious economic difficulties in many of the movements heartlands (notably the northern industrial towns), which disproportionally impacted on the societies through a decrease in consumer spending despite the British economy seeing a rise in overall consumer disposable income. This was largely due to the strong increase in wealth and social inequality in the UK at this time. The co-operative movement was not well placed to tap into this increase in middle class spending due to the geographic spread of its stores and The Co-op's historic association as the shop for the "working poor".

Secondly, redevelopment projects in many cities between the 1950s and 1970s often moved people from rows of terraced housing (which featured co-op stores dotted throughout) to newer purpose-built estates, with around 18,000 co-op stores closing as they had become redundant.

Thirdly, the time was a period of notable inflation and a strong pound, which had led to a wave of cheap imported goods – this devastated much of the UK's manufacturing industries (including the CWS). By the 1980s, it became clear that the trend in the retail sector was towards large (often out of town) supermarkets and hypermarkets with hundreds of them appearing across the UK.

The co-operative movement did build some superstores, having 74 by 1986, but often their development and competitiveness was hindered by the lack of a national distribution network and price competitiveness. In an attempt to improve the collective buying power of the movement the CWS acted to reposition itself from a wholesaler (from which societies can choose to buy) to a 'buying group' (where the CWS buys on behalf of), in order that CWS could increase the proportion of produce sold through co-operative stores that was sourced by itself. Though this did work to increase loyalty, it was not until the 2000s with the development of the Co-operative Retail Trading Group that the CWS became the de facto wholesaler for co-operative stores.

During the 1980s, the CWS began to merge with a number of failing co-operative societies, having returned to direct retailing after its merger with the SCWS the decade before. These mergers with consumers' co-operatives led to the co-op having both corporate (co-op societies) and individual members, hence making it both a primary and secondary co-operative. The CWS's expansion into direct retailing (especially after the mergers of the 2000s) led to the CWS becoming a highly visible business in the UK. The legacy of this was that many people perceive the British co-operative movement to be one business, The Co-operative Group, or co-op for short.

=== Modernisation and takeover attempts (1990–1999) ===
By the start of the 1990s, the co-operative movement's share of the UK grocery market had declined to the point where the entire business model was in question. This was at a time when many building societies were demutualising as many of the public preferred the short-term financial gain of the windfall payment over the perceived lack of benefits from the mutual model. For a time it seemed as though the mutual or co-op model was almost dead.

The Co-op's reputation was not helped in this respect by the factions within the movement, notably the strong rivalry between the CRS and the CWS, acting in a manner which exacerbated the belief held by many members of the public that, rather than working for the interests of all members, co-ops were largely acting in the self-interests of a dominant 'clique' of members within each society.

Together these crises meant that the 1990s would become a crucial decade if the Co-op was to survive. In order to raise capital to invest in its food stores (and also the increasingly successful Co-operative Bank), the CWS sold many of its factories to Andrew Regan in 1994 for £111 million in what initially appeared to be a highly beneficial arrangement for the CWS.

However, later it appeared that those involved in this deal did so without the CWS Board's permission and had been also handing confidential CWS files to Regan. Notably, one Sunday newspaper printed the CWS' annual report before it had been officially released. This would later pose a huge threat to the CWS when in 1997 Regan posed a highly ambitious £1.2bn hostile takeover attempt of the CWS. This shocked many in the movement and consolidated support for the CWS as the 'linchpin' of the movement in a way that many had previously opposed.

The CWS, under the leadership of Graham Melmoth, was able to defend itself from this takeover bid, largely by informing Regan's creditors that his hostile takeover was based upon dubiously sourced data and bad business practices. The deal also failed because Regan had greatly misunderstood the CWS' complicated ownership structure, assuming that by paying off the 500,000 'active members' he could gain control of the CWS.

Though this strategy worked for the carpetbaggers working to demutualise UK building societies at the time, it failed to recognise that the ownership actually lay with millions of ordinary members and that many of these 'active members' were staunch co-operators and who would be unlikely to back the bid.

After investigations by a private detective and a subsequent criminal court case, Regan's bid was rejected and two senior CWS executives were dismissed and imprisoned for fraud. An arrest warrant was issued for Andrew Regan in 1999 however he had already emigrated to Monaco.

The shock that Regan's bid sent through the co-operative movement has been attributed with sowing the seeds for the reduced hostilities between the CWS and CRS factions which eventually ended with the CRS becoming a member of the CRTG before fully merging with the CWS in 1999. The merger took two years to complete and the launch of the newly combined business, named The Co-operative Group, was timed with the release of the 2001 Co-operative Commission report, chaired by John Monks, which proposed a strategy of modernisation.

The report focused on improving store design and building a consistent branding whilst also driving for efficiency savings to make the food business more competitive – the similarity in conclusions between the 1919, 1958 and 2001 reports highlights the distinct lack of progress within the movement during this time. The 2001 report also highlighted the need to market what it called 'The Co-operative Advantage'; a favourite idea of Graham Melmoth, which suggested that commercial success would provide the funding for the social goals of the movement which (when the public saw a tangible benefit to their own lives) would provide a competitive advantage to the Co-op which would further its commercial success – a virtuous cycle. Unlike Gaitskell Commission's 1958 report the recommendations of the report, notably the major update to "The Co-operative brand" and the re-launch of the membership dividend scheme, were largely adopted by the co-operative movement including The Co-operative Group. These changes to the business are largely credited with the successes in profitability and the achievement in social goals which improved in the years after the Co-operative Commission report.

As a part of the CWS-CRS merger, new governance arrangements were designed with the 'independent societies' becoming part owners of the new Group and their representatives were elected to the group's national board. The largest change, however, was the much stronger representation for the individual members of the retailing operation with a string of regional boards and area committees designed to facilitate a clear democracy and representation on a local and national level. The composite nature of the Co-op as both a primary and a secondary co-operative led to the business having both individual members and corporate members (independent co-operative societies) which had to be included in any democratic structure. This led to a governance arrangement which was complicated and not understood by many individual members and which led to relatively few members becoming democratically engaged with the business. During 2007 the then chief executive Martin Beaumont was critical of the lack of commercial expertise on the board, foreshadowing the conclusions drawn from later Myners review into the near failure of the business during 2013 which was (in part) due to an unfit governance arrangement. In 2014 the governance arrangements were completely redesigned to reflect the recommendations of the Myners review – for more information see the governance section.

==== Establishing the "Co-operative difference" ====
Though the modernisation of the business was most noticeable after the 1997 takeover attempt, this is not to say that modernisation of the CWS had not been under way for some time. Since 1993 the CRTG had been working to switch the role of the CWS from "selling to" to "buying for" co-operative societies as a way of maximising the economies of scale to become more competitive to the major supermarkets. Since the 1960s the Co-op had been following retail trends after they had occurred, always having to catch up, in a way that it led the changes before the Second World War. Many leaders within the movement began to appreciate that this approach to retailing was not working, for example, expanding into hypermarkets after Tesco and Sainsbury's had already developed a dominant position, but without the resources to compete on price. After the 1997 strategic review the business suggested that it close the majority of its hypermarkets and department stores and instead focus on its core chain of convenience stores.

As a further attempt to differentiate itself from its larger competitors The Co-operative Bank had introduced an ethical policy in 1992. The CWS decided that, though it had always aimed to trade responsibly (for example though the working conditions in its factories and plantations as well as its boycott of South African produce during the years of apartheid), by cementing its "ethical" credentials in a series of strong and clear policy commitments it could work to convince the public of the "co-operative difference".

As a part of this, the Co-op worked with The Fairtrade Foundation to help introduce the Fairtrade Mark in the UK. It was an early adopter of the RSPCA's 'Freedom Foods' animal welfare certification. It introduced the first supermarket range of 'environmentally friendly' household products and the first range of toiletries certified by Cruelty Free International as "not tested on animals".

This new adoption of an ethical strategy was only part of the CWS' changes. The Co-op made notable changes to its packaging with nutritional labelling on food (1985) and later introduced Braille. Many own brand products were also reformulated to reduce the amount of salt, sugar and fat in order to make the product range more healthy.

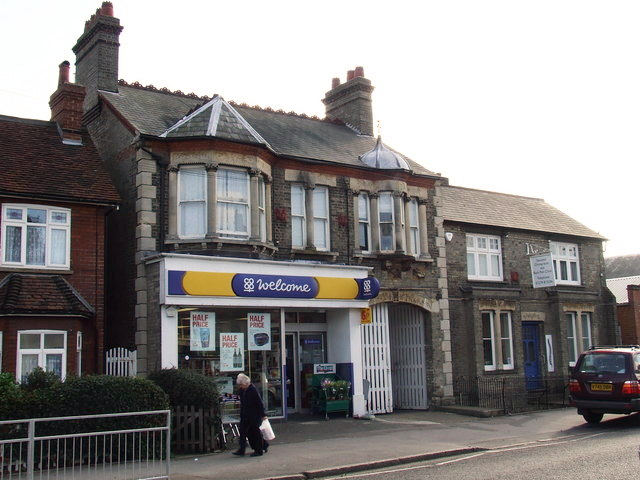
Example of the 'Co-Op Welcome' branding from Stansted Mountfitchet

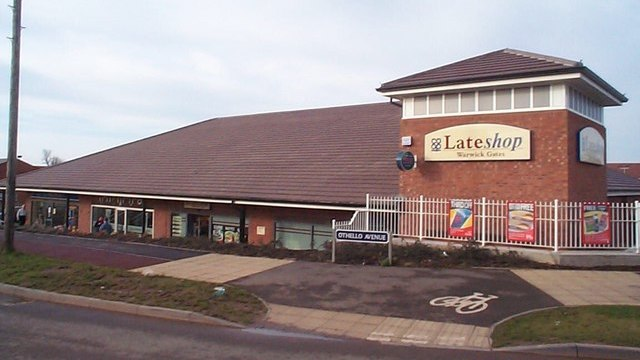
Example of the 'Late Shop' branding on the co-op store in Whitnash

To implement what was a core recommendation of the 2001 Co-operatives Commission, The Co-operative Group launched a brand panel which was tasked with developing consistent national branding. For decades, marketing by co-operatives was confusing for many customers with different societies adopting different store names (notably "Co-op Welcome" and "Co-op Late Shop"), various shop fascia designs and inconsistent marketing. Also, the cloverleaf design of the Co-op logo was seen by many as too associated with the years of neglect and decline within the movement and hence The Co-operative Group aimed to launch a totally new brand.

The new "The Co-operative" branding was first displayed at the 2005 co-operative congress and became the first brand which could bring together all of the co-operative businesses (both those of The Group and the independent societies) under a single consistent brand. With the brand came a set of standards which any outlet using the brand must adhere to. A twelve-month pilot of the new branding followed and resulted in a significant growth in sales following the re-branding of stores. Not all of the independent societies joined this new branding however, with United Co-operatives (prior to its merger with the Co-operative Group), the Scottish Midland Co-operative Society and the Lincolnshire Co-operative Society not adopting the new brand design. In combination with the new "The Co-operative" redesign, the Co-op relaunched the co-operative membership scheme, re-introducing the member dividend.

Together, this renewed focus on responsible trading, the redesign of "The Co-operative" brand and the reintroduction of the member dividend improved public perceptions. In 2006 a survey found the Co-op to be the most trusted major retailer in the UK and almost six million people joined the membership scheme over the following five years. Even after The Co-operative Group's financial crisis of 2013 the 'Have Your Say' survey found that more than 70% of the public agreed that the Co-op 'tries to do the right thing'.

=== Expansion (2000–2012) ===
The VG logo and shop livery, c. 1990

Following the integration of the CRS and CWS into the new Group structure it became evident that the business required significant modernisation and rationalisation of its businesses. The Co-operative Group followed by selling its loss-making footwear and milk processing businesses as well as some aspects of its agricultural production. The business also sold many of its larger supermarkets and hypermarkets using the funds to expand further into the convenience store sector, notably through adding 600 stores, following the acquisition of the Alldays chain. Alldays had previously purchased the VG chain of small supermarkets, which operated a franchise operation, supplying marketing and own-brand products to independently owned grocers. The Co-op invested significantly in distribution facilities, notably by opening a purpose-built National Distribution Centre in Coventry during 2006.

As a result of their steady expansion after 2000 the Pharmacy and Funeralcare businesses were performing well, however the farming business was poorly aligned with the needs of the food stores and so was significantly reorganised in 2007 to focus the farmland on producing produce for the business's food stores. The co-op also expanded into new markets adding a legal services business (providing conveyancing, will writing and probate services) and an Energy Generation business, the latter included significant investment in renewable energy generation which formed another key aspect of the co-op's drive towards its ethical image.

At the start of 2007, the group began discussions with United Co-operatives, then the UK's second-largest co-operative, about a merger of the societies. Such a merger was expected to lead to significant efficiency savings. On 16 February 2007, the boards announced they were to merge subject to members' approval, and on 28 July 2007 the newly enlarged Co-operative Group was launched. At the same time, the group transferred the engagements of the Scottish Nith Valley Co-operative Society which, while trading profitably, was suffering a burden with its pension fund commitments.

Before the United merger was complete, the Chief Executive, Peter Marks, was already preparing another acquisition as he believed that only through significant growth could the co-operative become truly sustainable in the long term. In July 2008, the group announced a deal to purchase the Somerfield chain of 900 supermarkets and convenience stores. The sale was completed on 2 March 2009, costing £1.57 bn. The conversion and rebranding of Somerfield stores into Coop stores took just over two years and was completed by summer 2011.

In 2008, the group bought ten convenience stores trading as Bell's and Jackson's in the north and east of England from Sainsbury's.

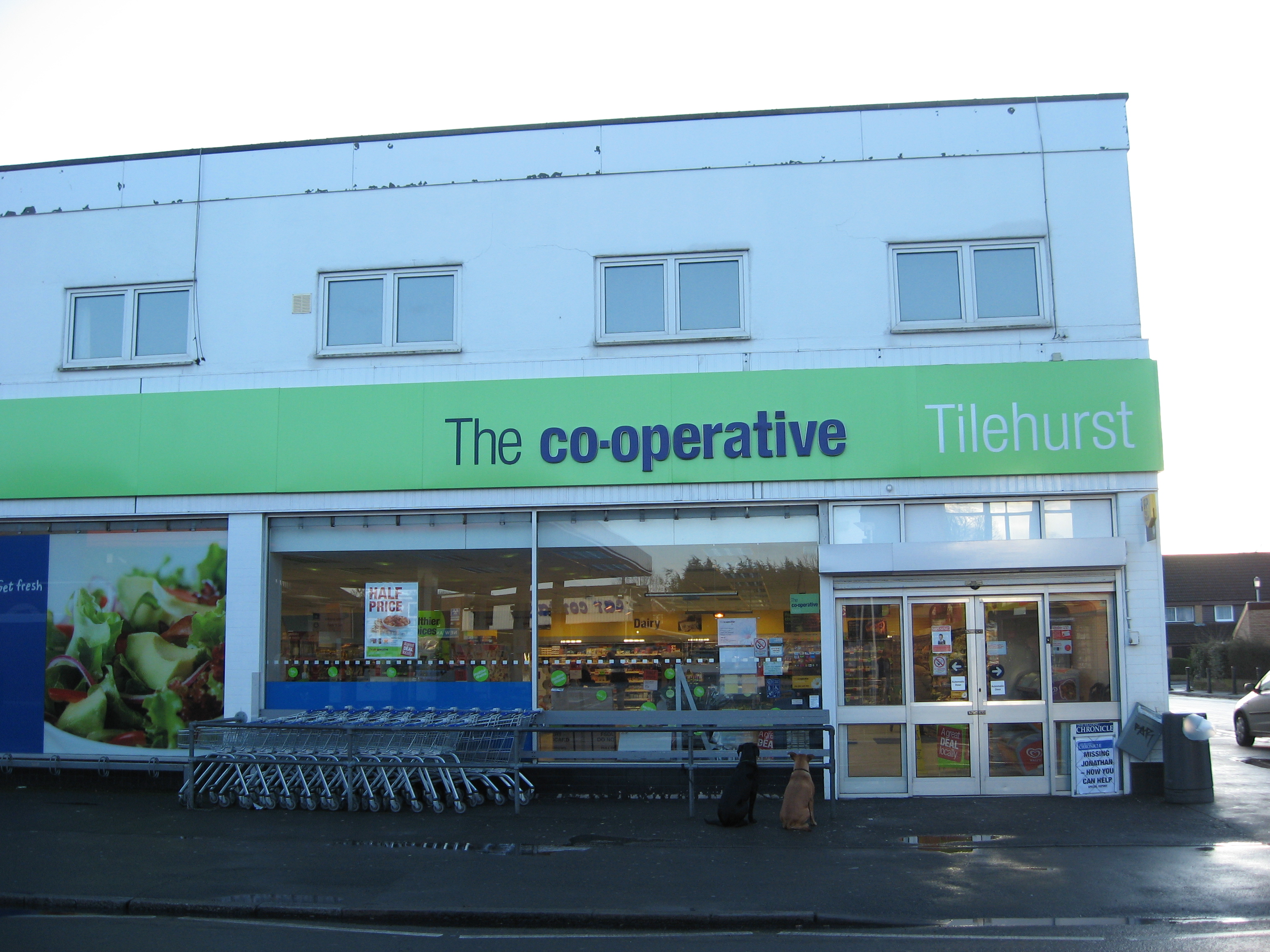
Co-op Group convenience store (2007-2016 brand) Tilehurst, Berkshire

In autumn 2008, Lothian, Borders & Angus Co-operative Society members voted to transfer engagements to the Co-operative Group. The transfer came into effect on 13 December 2008. The group announced in November 2008 that despite the economic downturn, half-year profits had risen by 35.6 per cent to £292.6 million for the six months to June 2008. In January 2009, Co-operative Financial Services and the Britannia Building Society announced their intention to merge, subject to regulatory and member approval. Members of the Plymouth & South West Co-operative Society joined the Co-operative Group in September 2009.

The Group's reputation suffered in 2007 when 38 of its 41 stores in Sussex failed fire safety inspections and it was fined £250,000. It was fined £210,000 in 2010 after an investigation at one of its Southampton stores.

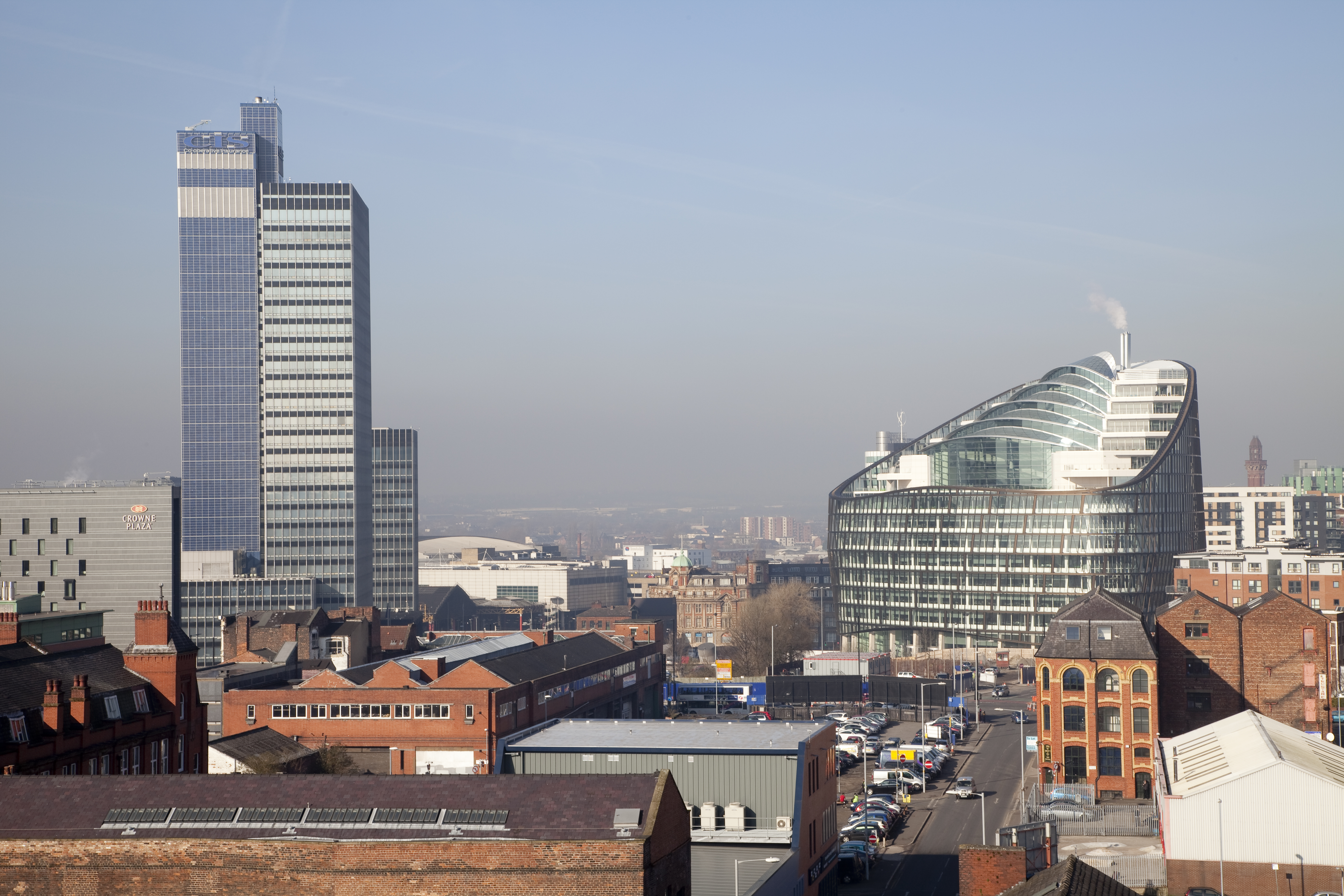
CIS Tower and One Angel Square in Manchester, England

In May 2010, the Co-operative Group unveiled plans to build a new headquarters in Manchester. The initial phase of construction commenced on Miller Street near the existing estate where the Group has been based since 1863. The project, entitled NOMA, aims to reflect ethical values of the organisation in its design, construction and its relationship with employees and the surrounding communities. The centrepiece of the initial development is One Angel Square, one of the largest buildings in Europe to have a BREEAM Outstanding Distinction as a result of its high sustainable energy credentials. Occupation of the new building began in early 2013.

=== Financial crisis (2013–2014) ===
In May 2013, after recognising inadequate capital levels in its banking group, Euan Sutherland took over from Peter Marks as Chief Executive. That month Moody's downgraded the bank's credit rating by six notches to junk status (Ba3) and the bank's Chief Executive, Barry Tootell, resigned. The difficulties stem largely from the commercial loans of the Britannia Building Society, acquired in the 2009 merger. The Co-operative Insurance sold its life insurance and pensions business to Royal London releasing about £200M in capital, and planned to dispose of its general insurance business. Further financial restructuring was expected.

On 5 June 2013, Richard Pennycook, former Finance Director of Morrisons, was named The Co-operative Group's Finance Director, and Richard Pym, former Chief Executive of Alliance & Leicester, as Chair of The Co-operative Banking Group and The Co-operative Bank. The group lost £2.5 billion in 2013, and debt stood at £1.4 billion at the end of 2013.

In May 2014, a special member's meeting agreed to restructure the way members elected the board, largely along the lines suggested in a governance report by Lord Myners. The Myners Review was very critical of the co-operative movement's (and especially the Group's) lack of response to the 1958 commission report and for the failure of the Group's governance since the merger of CWS and CRS in 2000. The review also underlined the requirement to focus on making and retaining annual profits which can be invested in the long-term future of the business and to avoid the risks of over-expansion and 'empire-building' as had nearly destroyed the business in 2013.

During 2014, the group sold a series of businesses to reduce debt. The Co-operative Pharmacy was sold for £620 million to the Bestway Group, Co-operative Farms was sold for £249 million to the Wellcome Trust, and Sunwin (the group's cash transportation business) was sold for £41.5 million to Cardtronics.

=== Mutualisation and Rebuilding (2015–2024) ===
Having scaled back their operations to their core food, funeral, insurance, electrical and legal businesses in the preceding years, the business set about modernising these businesses. In April 2015, The Co-operative Group announced that it had reduced its debt levels by approximately 40% (to £808M) and had made a small profit during 2014, but would not pay a dividend to members until 2018. When The Co-operative Group released its annual report in 2016, it showed that its food business was growing faster than the overall grocery market (by 3.2 percentage points) and that like-for-like sales were up 3.8% in its core convenience estate. This reflected the significant growth in the convenience sector in the UK following a shift in consumer habits towards shopping little and often. Owing to their strength in the market, the food business chose to focus on their estate of approximately 2,500 convenience stores, selling over 100 of their larger supermarkets and opening 300 new convenience stores during 2014, 2015 and 2016, particularly in London and the South East of England. The business also sold 298 of its smallest stores to McColl's in 2016 with the aim of providing a more consistent shopping experience by focusing on stores primarily in the 2000–4000 square foot bracket where a greater range of own brand products could be sold. The food range in stores was refreshed with a smaller range of items, tailored to individual stores, rather than their previous policy of determining product range purely on store size. The Co-op also shifted to a strategy of driving sales by reducing the price and increasing the quality of products, by increasing the proportion of produce produced in the UK and the roll-out of locally sourced products in small clusters of stores (following a successful trial in Yorkshire). As their ethical image had largely recovered after their financial crisis, they focused attention on differentiating the food business through measures such as by driving a significant increase in sales of Fairtrade goods (sales of Fairtrade products rose 18% during 2016), through being the first major UK supermarket to switch all of its own brand meat (excluding continental meats like chorizo) to being British sourced and through reinventing the Society's membership scheme to include a reward of 5% of spend on own brand items being credited to the member and a further 1% being donated to a local cause of their choosing.

Following years of under-investment, the Co-op brought in Mike Bracken, in order to completely re-invent the Society's digital operations and to drive back office efficiencies in the food, funeral and insurance businesses. Focus was also given to re-targeting the insurance business as the preferred insurance provider for Co-op members rather than chasing market share. In 2016 the Co-op announced its intentions to discontinue its use of the movement branding scheme "The Co-operative" branding with a relaunch of "Co-op" branding from the 1960s, while the then CEO commented that this simply reflected what communities and customers already called the society and he just didn't understand the case for the longer name the change also meant the society would no long share the branding scheme still used by the bank, relevant because it was fears that members associated the branding with the failures of the organisation.

On 1 March 2017 Richard Pennycook stood down as Group CEO and was succeeded by the CEO of the Co-op's food division, Steve Murrells. The new leader presented this as representing a shift in the focus of the business from the Rebuilding phase and into a phase of planning for Renewal. In their 2017 annual results the Co-op announced that all of the group's businesses were gaining in market share and that their new membership scheme had led to an additional 700,000 members joining the Society during its first six months, although this news was overshadowed by the group reporting a loss during 2016 after being forced to write off their shareholding in the still troubled Co-operative Bank.

== Mutual practices ==
As a former co-operative, the group brand strategy still vibes off the former place of importance of ethical and transparent trading and reporting, democratic accountability and participation, in the former society. Colleague co-owners hold colleague membership cards and can expect representation in member structures and by the board . The society retains annual subscriptions to Apex, most greatly reduced under the new form), including to Co-ops UK and the InternationalCooperative Alliance and resources a member council and member engagement officers. Individual stores may have member forums and may have local causes which benefit from membership card use in store.

Groups structure represents multiple stakeholders, with both other societies and individual members in individual household holding common stakes. Unlike a pure consumer co-operative, the former co-op apportions voting rights to member societies in its membership, with voting power shared between the corporate members and the individual consumer members, as described in an annual report:

Voting for corporate members is in proportion to trade with the society. Each individual member has one vote in the appropriate region of the society and each region has voting rights calculated on the same basis as a corporate member.

== Social, economic and societal goals ==
In addition to stated adherence to the international values and principles the parent society maintains an open and voluntary co-ownership body, with membership provided for via a plastic card with an nominal full subscription of £1 sterling to any resident willing to subscribe, the co-operative society is governed and owned in accordance with its constitution, rules and bylaws under Co-operative and Community Benefit law.

With the exception of its Board, which is majority appointed by execs the society operates a one-member - one vote system of democracy for the elected component of its governance and uses electronic means to drive wider engagement by its owner consumers and owner colleagues. Representation but not franchise is extended to privately held operators via Nisa who make social goals possible on every item of Co-op Group product sold.

Co-op produces a separate report of its social performance and maintains a list of charities each of its stores are supporting out of revenue before profits, which individual members can then assign support derived from their trade with the stores across the UK to that local (less than 25 km) cause. Typically a small 4,000 sq stores contributes thousands of pounds a year out of its takings, which compares well to the multiple hundred of pounds a year contributed by other chain retail stores occupying 12,000 to 24,000 sq feet in the same communities, and made possible by the ownership stake of individuals in the goods or services they themselves consume and resource and co-operative ownership of in Co-ops logistics and buying team operations.

=== Current initiatives ===
==== Co-op Foundation ====
Co-op Foundation is the Co-op's own charity and is a working name of the Co-operative Community Investment Foundation, a charity established in 2000 and registered in England and Wales (1093028) and Scotland (SC048102).

=== Co-operative Party ===
Co-op is a major affiliate and supporter of the Co-operative Party, which fields candidates in elections on joint tickets with the Labour Party as Labour and Co-operative Party. It is annual subscription payment makes it a substantial funder of the Co-operative Party nationally, with group trade in every region of England, Wales and Scotland. As a distribution out of surplus this continues to be subject to member vote and approval at the annual Co-op Group member meeting and AGM. In 2020, the annual general meeting voted to continue funding the Co-operative Party by a vote of 42,514 for, to 9,000 against. In 2019, the Co-op made donations totalling £625,600 (2018: £625,600) to the Co-operative Party. In following AGMs, the membership continued to vote to maintain affiliation; however the distribution motions proposed by the board in successive years did not increase with inflation and remained around the £650,000 mark during the covid and Ukraine war bouts of real terms UK inflation.

In addition to core aims of furthering co-operative values and mutualism in parliaments across the UK and Isle of Man, activists and representatives (MPs & Peers, MSPs, MSs, MLAs and councillors) campaign on wider social issues.

==== Co-operative school academies ====
The Group sponsors a non-profit multi-academy trust in the North of England, the Co-op Academies Trust. Founded in 2010, the Trust had grown to 32 academies, across 3 regional hubs by 2023. Co-op does provide resource and continue to ensure the values and principles remain key to the ethos of the school bodies. Students wear uniforms with a Co-operative/Co-operation logo on the breast pocket.

=== Former initiatives ===
==== Membership, Co-operation and Community Co-ordinators ====
With input from the values of principles of the movement, fed in by the National Member Council, which includes representatives from the independent societies, apex bodies, and elected representatives of individuals on the council and senate, Co-op until recently used resources generated by the community stakes in the business to fund coordinators, known as "Pioneers" across the England, Wales and Scotland. Having tested the concept of member fora in towns across the UK and several London boroughs, which included visits to co-operative heritage, screening of the Co-op funded film about the establishment of Co-op in Rochdale, open meetings including superstore managers and events with the beta testing of the initial Member Pioneer concept was ended in 2015, with the society later forming a body of over 500 people across the UK to 'work to improve communities such as supporting a local cause or establishing local forums'. This initiative ceased with a change of senior leadership in 2022, with the co-op instead returning to model of Membership, Co-operation and Community Co-ordinators traditionally used by the society, and by sister co-ops such as Central England, with an increase of 3 FTE role holders on the numbers of staff directedly directing community outreach over pre-2013 numbers.

==== The Co-operative Film Festival ====
The Co-operative Film Festival (formerly known as the Co-operative Young Film-Makers festival) started in 1966 and ended in 2013. It was a non-competitive and not-for-profit film festival designed to encourage young people to be creative. The National Science and Media Museum in Bradford was the host venue and associate of the festival from the year 1999 until 2013.

==== Community Solar Installations ====
In the late 2000s the member committees of the society across its trading areas committed to spreading awareness of the green transition; including via affording then scarce community dividend funding to installing solar pv on co-op/community buildings and a school.

== Businesses ==
=== Convenience retail ===
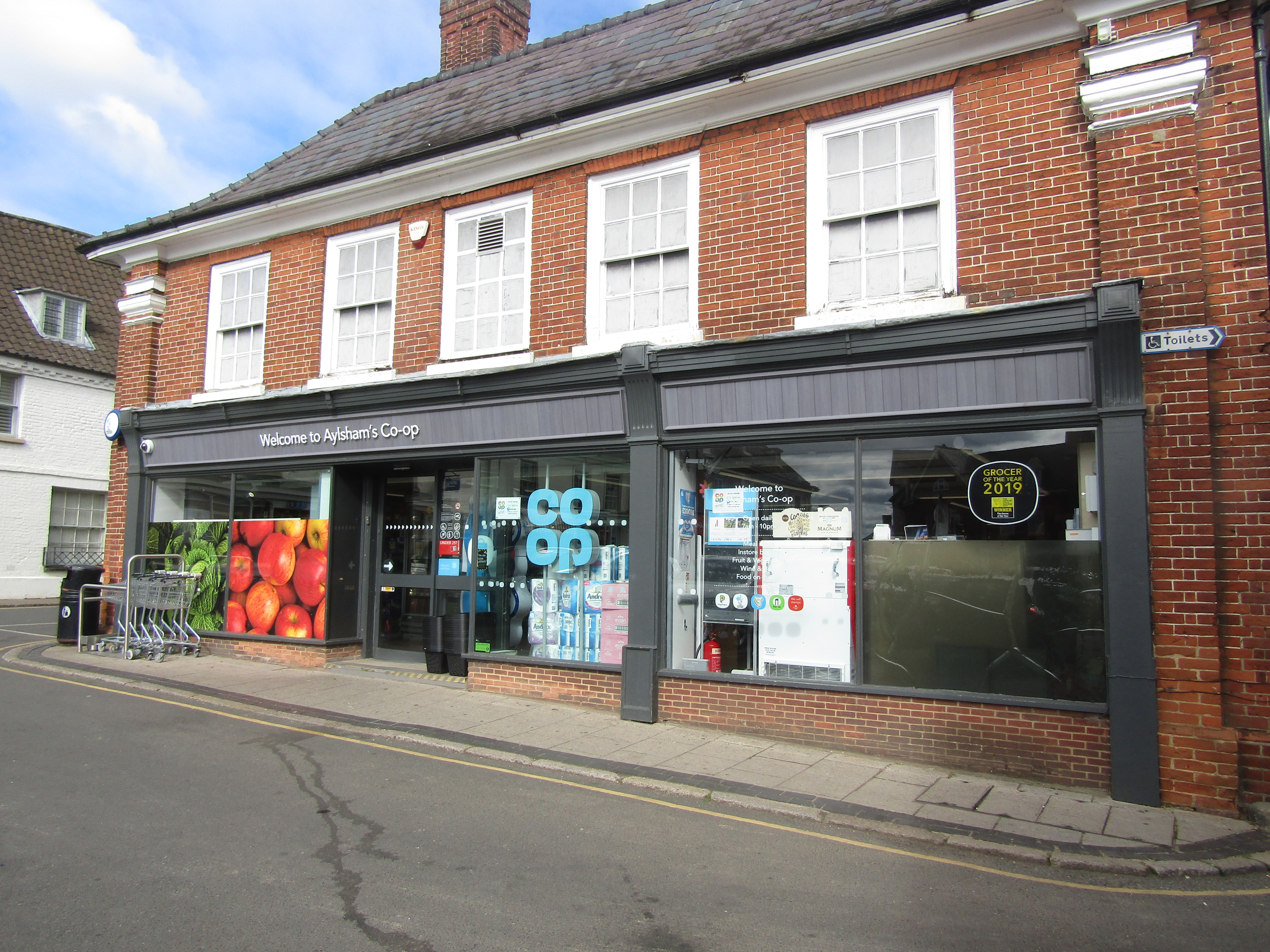
Co-op convenience store Aylsham, Norfolk using cloverleaf branding

Co-op Food is the largest division of the group with around 2,400 grocery stores which cover the largest geographical spread of any grocery retailer. The society mainly operate a convenience store format, having exited most locations with less than 2,000 sq foot or more than 8,000 Sq foot of sales spaces. In addition, Co-op offers an online grocery delivery and collection service from nearest store in most stores covering UK and Isle of Man postcodes. Some Stores remain open beyond 9pm. The Co-op has an exclusive partnership agreement with the National Union of Students and works with third party delivery partners, including Amazon, Deliveroo and Starship Technologies.

Foodservice operations include third-party brands such as Costa Express and Rollover hot dogs as well as Co-op owned brands including Ever Ground Coffee, a Fairtrade coffee brand.

=== Supermarket Retail and Shopping Centre Development ===
As of 2023 it is the seventh largest grocery chain in the UK, with a 5.4% market share. Despite 45 years of withdrawing supermarket locations some mid-sized 'superstores' remain in some counties of England and Wales, with the largest number remaining in Scotland.

The Co-op formerly owned the Newhaven Shopping Centre development, which hosted a travel agents and a grocery store operated by Group.

=== Business to Business (B2B) ===
==== Wholesale ====
Nisa is a wholesaler and symbol group which was acquired in 2018 and supplies thousands of independent stores directly or through other symbol groups such as Costcutter Supermarkets Group. Unlike some of its competitors, Nisa does not own or operate its own store estate.

==== Federal services ====
The Co-op acts as a wholesaler for stores owned by other consumers' co-operatives and is the manager for the Cooperative federation, Co-operative Federal Trading Services.

==== Franchising ====
Co-op Franchise was established in 2019 and offers a franchised Co-op convenience store model. Franchise partners must share the Co-op's values and principles and meet other criteria. Costcutter founder, Colin Graves, was the first chair of the Co-op's 'Wholesale and Franchising Advisory Board'. Around 100 franchised Co-op convenience stores are planned by the end of 2026.

=== Life services ===
==== Loans, Funerals and pre-paid funeral plans ====
Co-op Funeralcare is the UK's largest Funeral Director, with over 800 funeral homes in England, Scotland and Wales, most of which now operate using the Co-op Funeralcare brand. Revenue for the division was £271m in 2022.

==== Legal advice ====
Co-op Legal Services (CLS) is a legal services provider registered in England and Wales. Services cover family law and divorce, writing wills, probate, conveyancing, personal injury and employment law. The group announced the formation of this division, based in Bristol, in April 2006. The business also provides Scottish and Northern Irish legal services through partnerships with Brodies LLP and Wilson Nesbitt and does not operate outside the UK, including the Isle of Man. In 2018, CLS acquired Simplify Probate, the UK's second largest provider of probate services. CLS has targeted £100m in annual turnover by 2027, up from £39m in 2021.

==== Insurance ====
Co-op Insurance Services is a business which resells a range of insurance products to Co-op members and customers on behalf of a manufacturer, currently based in Gibraltar. The society no longer manufactures insurance themselves, and is released from the considerable financing and managerial resource of doing so for members. In 2018, Co-op Insurance entered the travel insurance market with a new product underwritten by Mapfre. Co-op also offer life insurance and critical illness cover through a partnership with Legal & General. The Co-op sell business insurance through a partnership with Miles Smith and distribute Co-op branded motor and home insurance products for Markerstudy. In 2022, the Co-op Insurance division contributed £24m in annual revenue to the Co-op Group.

=== Marketing and customer data insight ===
The groups version of Co-op Membership has 5 million active members in the UK and Isle of Man (not to be confused with memberships which still utilse the brand scheme managed by group, such as Co-op Group members who are customers of the Coventry Building Society) and provides a range of marketing, customer engagement and data science services to clients. Brand names have opportunities to provide further consideration to promote link save offers on their products and even provided charitable contributions to co-op partners in the years Co-op were unable to.

In 2019, a new Co-op app was launched with weekly member offers and discounts. In 2024, the Co-op launched Co-op Media Network Group, the UK's first convenience retail media network. Co-op has a target of 8m member-owners by 2030.

=== Land and property ===
Co-op Property (formerly The Co-operative Estates) has interests in retail & residential property management, investment and land development. Some of the Groups trading sites remain wholly in member ownership, while the full trading footprint requires management, service and maintenance. Owning land in communities directly is not always consistently followed, with sales and sale and lease back being heavily used in prior years. The sale of Co-op petrol stations and the licensed land they sit on was a considerable transaction; greatly reducing what was previously a significant footprint of forecourt stores and freeing the group of the financing and redevelopment of the sites as the prohibitions of petrol and diesel internal combustion engine vehicles rolls out. The Co-operative Estates was involved in the £800M 20-acre (8-hectare) NOMA development in Manchester prior to its exit from its joint venture with partner Hermes, which yielded £12 million. In 2013, the Group raised £142M through a sale and leaseback of its One Angel Square headquarters to investors in a 25-year lease to 2038.

=== Former ===
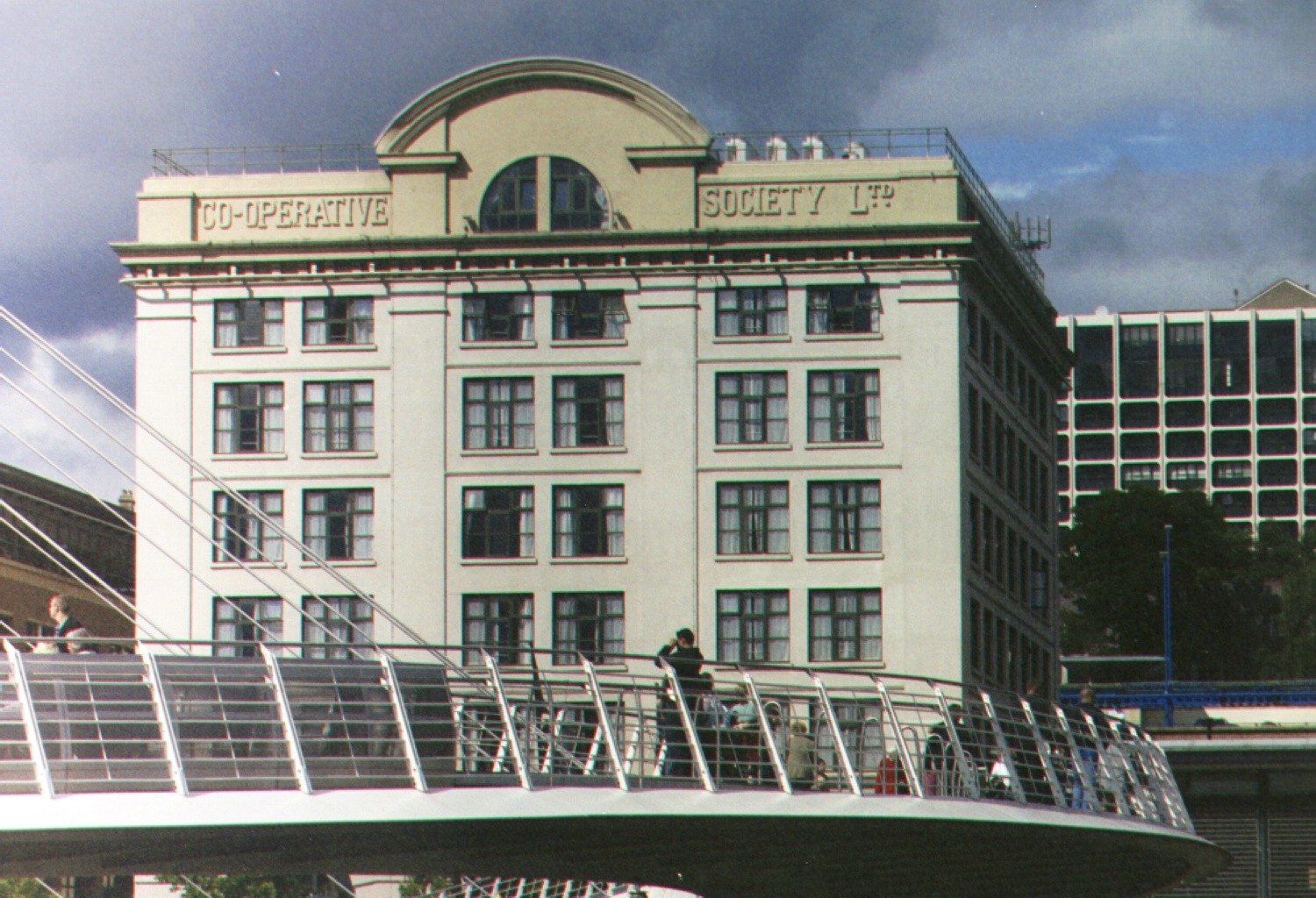
Former CWS warehouse by the Gateshead Millennium Bridge, Newcastle upon Tyne, England

- Syncro was the rebranded engineering and building services business of the Co-operative Group, based in Salford. Syncro was sold in 2006.
- Associated Co-operative Creameries (ACC) was the group's milk processing and distribution division. ACC handled logistics of the retail business but this responsibility was transferred to Co-operative Supply Chain Logistics before it was sold to Dairy Farmers of Britain, a farmers co-operative, on 10 August 2004.
- The Co-operative Department Stores business was exited after many years of increasing losses, with several stores being acquired by the Anglia Regional Co-operative Society, and the remainder were closed. Many stores had been in poor locations and had suffered from under-investment. Initially, two stores were to be retained in Perth and Tunbridge Wells to trial a new style of department store, but these were also closed in 2006.
- The Co-operative Motor Group ceased trading following the disposal of Albert Farnell and its last remaining dealerships in 2013. However, Central England Co-operative continued to operate dealerships as The Co-operative Motor Group until 2015.
- Shoefayre, established in 1959, as Society Shoes was co-owned by several co-operative societies and became owned and managed by the Co-operative Group. In 2006, it reported operating losses of £6 million and in 2007 was sold to Shoe Zone.

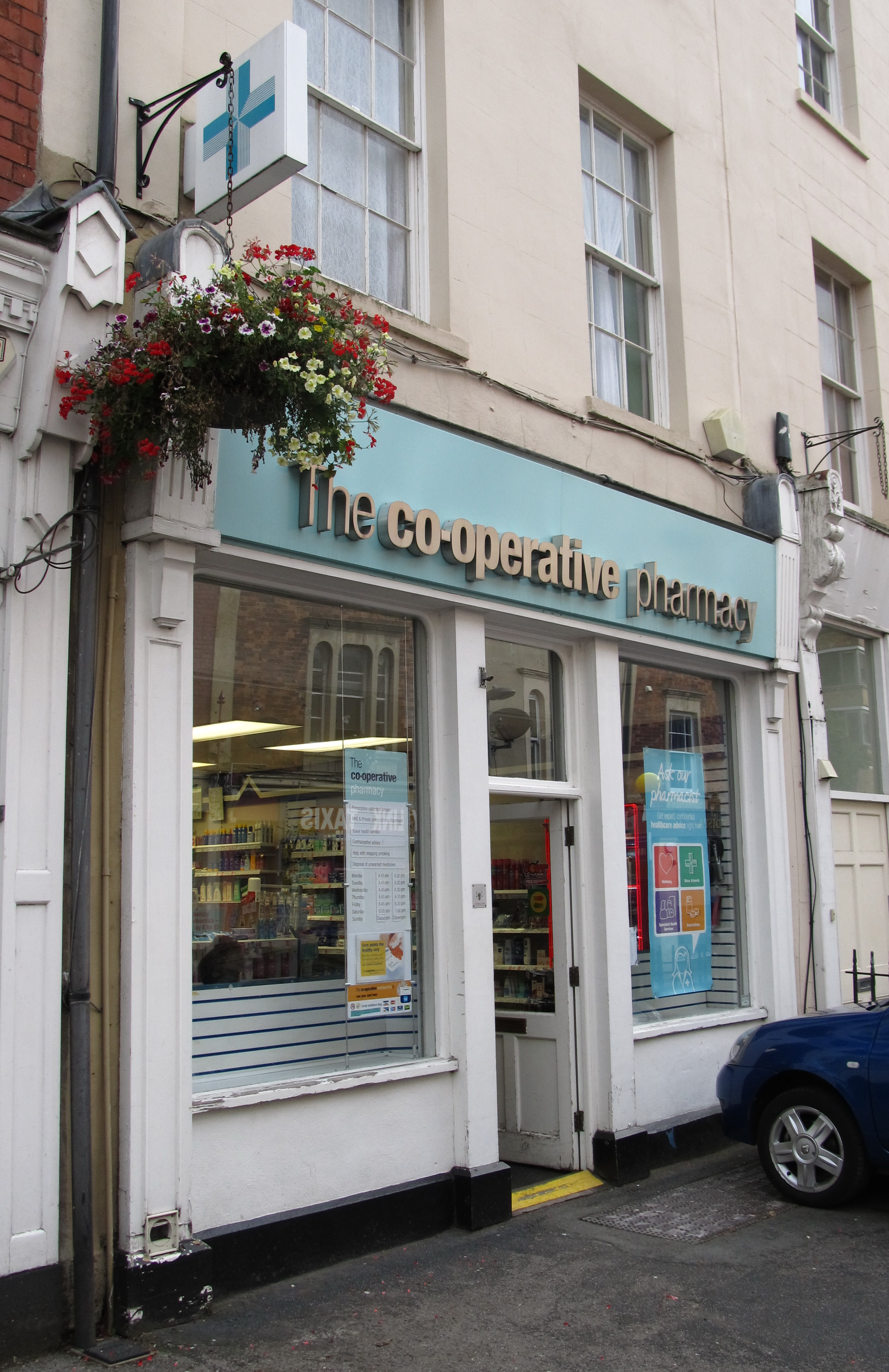
Co-operative Pharmacy, St Michael's Hill, Bristol just before the sale to Bestway

- The Co-operative Pharmacy, established as National Co-operative Chemists in 1945, grew to be the third largest community pharmacy group in the UK with nearly 800 branches giving a nationwide presence. In 2014 it was sold for £620 million to the Bestway Group and subsequently re-branded as Well Pharmacy.
- Sunwin Security Services was sold in 2014 to Cardtronics, a US cash machine operator in a deal worth up to £41.5M. Sunwin's main business was maintaining ATM's in Co-op food stores and for other businesses.
- Co-op Electrical sold electrical products, from kitchenware and white goods to home entertainment. In 2015, the Co-op became the first electrical retailer to sell its extended warranty insurance products at cost price. In the previous decades extended warranties had gained a reputation for being poor value for money, but for being heavily promoted by retailers owing to their high profitability. The business was also unusual in providing a 60-minute delivery time slot, confirmed by SMS on the day of delivery. Co-op Electrical was shut down in March 2019.
- Co-operative Clothing supplied workwear, businesswear & uniforms for catering, construction, beauty and most other industries.
- Co-op Beds, an online bed retailer, was a strategic partnership with Silentnight which launched in 2018.
- The Co-operative Farms managed land across Great Britain, producing soft fruit, potatoes, flour and cider, and is the largest lowland farmer in the UK. In 2014 it was sold for £249 million to the Wellcome Trust and now trades under its former Farmcare name.
- The Co-operative Travel business was transferred into a new joint venture in 2011 with Thomas Cook and the Central England Co-operative. The Co-operative Group owned a 30% share in the venture which brought together its 401 travel agents with 103 branches owned by Midlands Co-operative, whilst Thomas Cook transferred 803 outlets to create the largest High Street travel agents network in the UK. The merger that created the venture was referred to the Office of Fair Trading as a result of monopoly concerns. The business had direct sales channels through telephone, home workers, and the internet. Prior to the merger, in July 2009 the business launched its own tour operation as a joint venture with Cosmos Holidays. In December 2016 the Co-op announced its intention to sell its stake in the venture to Thomas Cook during 2017, ending over 100 years of trading. The Group notified Thomas Cook of its decision to sell, which required the plc to buy-out its stake. Under the terms of the deal, Thomas Cook paid £50M for the Group's 30% share and £5.8M for Central England Co-operative's 3.5% stake. A guaranteed minimum dividend of £31.9M was also paid, plus interest. On 23 September 2019, Thomas Cook Group's UK travel business was placed into compulsory liquidation and 555 retail outlets were bought by Hays Travel for £6M.

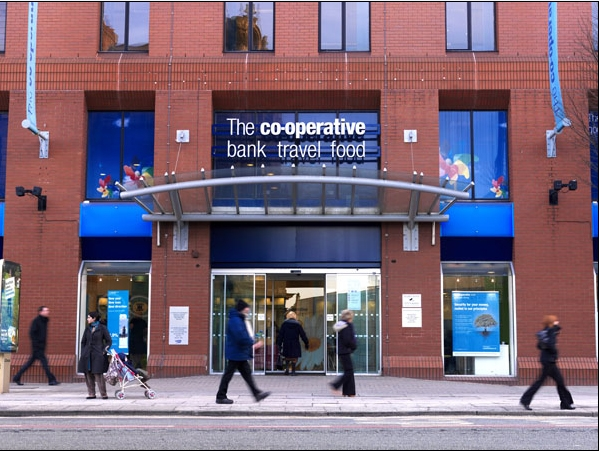
The Co-operative Bank head office building at 1 Balloon Street, Manchester, England

- The Co-operative Bank severed its ownership link with the Co-operative Group in September 2017. The bank had been a wholly owned subsidiary until 2014 when the group was forced to sell the majority of its holding to US hedge fund investors to raise funds for the bank. A campaign was subsequently launched by The Co-operative Party and some customers to sell the bank back to its customers. The Co-operative Bank also includes the internet bank Smile, and the former building society Britannia. A "relationship agreement" between the bank and the group expired in 2020.
- In 2016, Co-op Funeralcare sold its five crematoria to rival Dignity plc for £43M to invest in its core funeral home business.
- The Co-op Health mobile app was launched in May 2019. The app marked a return to the healthcare sector following the purchase of the repeat prescription app 'Dimec' for around £10m in 2018. A home delivery service was also available, dispensed from the Co-op's pharmacy at its Lea Green Depot. In March 2021, the business was sold to Phoenix UK, the parent company of the Numark and Rowlands pharmacy networks, for an undisclosed sum.
- Co-op Insurance businesses have been sold over a number of years. In 2013, Royal London Group acquired the Co-operative Insurance Society Limited (CIS) and The Co-operative Asset Management for up to £219M. Royal London now looks after all of the former life assurance, investment and pension businesses owned by the Co-operative Insurance Society. In January 2019, the Co-operative Group announced the sale of its insurance underwriting business for £185M to Markerstudy, to focus on a new insurance distribution business, Co-op Insurance Services. The sale of the underwriting business completed in December 2020.
- Co-op Power was a renewable energy buying business which bulk purchased energy for a range of businesses and organisations. The business also provided energy consultancy services to clients.
- The Co-op petrol station business was sold to Asda for £600 million in August 2022, to strengthen the group's financial position. The 129 petrol forecourt sites made up about 5% of the group's total retail sites.

=== Marketing and branding ===
CWS became Co-operative Group (CWS) Limited when it merged with CRS in 2001. CWS Retail was formed in 1933 and demerged in 1957 as CRS, with the purpose of opening shops in co-operative deserts and to take over failing retail societies. The combined Group merged with United Co-operatives, based in Yorkshire and North West England, in 2007, reinforcing its position as the largest consumer co-operative in the world. At this time the current name, Co-operative Group Limited, was adopted.

Following the mergers of the 1990s and 2000s, the modern Co-operative Group was formed of a large range of different independent societies with separate brand identities which led to a lack of consistency and gave an incoherent message to consumers. The four-leaf clover "Co-op" brand, introduced in 1967 and adjusted in 1993, was seen by many in the co-operative movement as a hindrance to public perception of the movement. This problem was affecting the whole co-operative sector in the UK and following the report from the Co-operative Commission in 2001, The Co-operative Group was heavily involved with the process of developing a single updated version of The Co-operative brand for use by many consumers' co-operatives in the UK.

In 2007, the group began a re-brand of its estate to this new unified identity with its other business names, including Travelcare and Funeralcare, phased out in favour of the new The Co-operative business names. With more than 4,000 stores and branches to convert to the new identity the process has been cited as the "largest rebranding exercise in UK corporate history." The Co-operative Group launched its largest television advertising campaign in 2009. The two and a half-minute advertisement aired for the first time during Coronation Street on ITV. The advertisement, created by McCann Erickson, features the Bob Dylan track "Blowin' in the Wind", a rare occasion that he has allowed his music to be used for commercial purposes.

== Governance ==
The Co-operative Group is unusual as a co-op because it is owned by millions of UK consumers and also a number of other UK co-operatives, making the business a hybrid of a primary consumers' co-operative and a co-operative federation. This is largely a function of the group resulting from the merger between the Co-operative Wholesale Society (a co-operative federation) and the Co-operative Retail Services in 2000. Since 2015 The Co-operative Group has operated a 'one member one vote' system whereby any of the Co-op's millions of members can vote to elect board members, to guide strategic decisions and propose their own motions for voting on.

The current governance structure of the business was established in 2014 and comprises an Executive Management Team, a Group Board and a Members' Council.

=== The Executive Management Team ===
The Executive Management Team are the highest level of management in the business and are responsible for its day-to-day operations.

=== The Group Board ===
The Group Board is a team of between seven and twelve people who are responsible for overseeing the strategy of the business and for holding the executive management team to account.

The Group Board is made up of: a Group Chair; either one or two executive directors appointed from the Executive Management Team; up to five Independent Non-Executive Directors who are not affiliated with the group; and up to four Member-Nominated Directors. Member Nominated Directors (MNDs) are any people from within the membership group who nominate themselves and have the required level of commercial experience.

=== The National Members' Council ===
The Members' Council is an elected group of one hundred people who hold the Group Board to account and acts as the guardian of the co-operative Values and Principles. Members of the Co-op, its employees and representatives of the 'independent societies' make up the Members' Council. The council is led by an elected Council president, Denise Scott-McDonald who chairs council meetings. Current members include Nick Crofts and former MEP David Hallam.

=== The Leadership Teams ===
As of 2017 the members of the Group Board and the Group Executive were:

Group Board

Name	Position	Date joined
Allan Leighton	Group Chair	2015
Steve Murrells	Chief Executive	2017
Pippa Wicks	Deputy Chief Executive	2017
Ian Ellis	Chief Financial Officer	2016
Sir Christopher Kelly	Independent Non-Executive Director	2014
Simon Burke	Independent Non-Executive Director	2014
Stevie Spring	Independent Non-Executive Director	2015
Peter Plumb	Independent Non-Executive Director	2015
Lord Victor Adebowale	Independent Non-Executive Director	2016
Ruth Spellman	Member Nominated Director	2015
Paul Chandler	Member Nominated Director	2015
Hazel Blears	Member Nominated Director	2015
Margaret Casely-Hayford	Member Nominated Director	2016

Group Executive

Name	Position
Steve Murrells	Chief Executive
Pippa Wicks	Deputy Chief Executive
Ian Ellis	Chief Financial Officer
Helen Webb	Chief People Officer
Jo Whitfield	Chief Executive, Co-op Food
Rod Bulmer	Chief Executive, Consumer Services
Helen Grantham	Group Secretary and General Counsel
Matt Atkinson	Chief Membership Officer

=== Executive remuneration ===
The Annual Report cites a number of factors in determining executive pay, including "attracting, retaining and motivating senior Executives of the appropriate calibre to further the success of the Group" and "ensuring that the interests of Executives are aligned with those of the Group and its members".

Former CEO Peter Marks was paid a basic salary of £1,014,000 in 2012, with a performance-related bonus of £103,000. The basic salaries of the thirteen executives adds up to £4,836,000, with their performance related bonuses adding up to £240,000.

In March 2014, "private and confidential" documents seen by The Observer newspaper detailed proposals put before The Co-operative's board to double the wage bill for senior management to £12 million a year, whereby the chief executive Euan Sutherland would earn a base salary of £1.5 million and a "retention bonus" of £1.5 million. The Observer also reported that Rebecca Skitt, the Co-op's chief human resources officer, who joined in February 2013, left 12 months later "with a proposed pay-off totalling more than £2M".

=== Member Owner Governance Structure 2007 to 2015 ===
Between the creation of The Co-operative Group in 2000 and the major governance changes of 2014–2015, the Group had a complex governance arrangement which consisted of the business executive, the Group Board of twenty people, a series of regional boards and numerous area committees. This could be likened to English local, county and national government, where society members stood for election and if successful were expected to represent members at all levels of the society, simultaneously, with positions held in on co-op committees corresponding to departments (the businesses boards), the cabinet (the national Board), devolved nations and regions (Regional Boards), counties and parish councils (Area Committees), plus doing press events and engaging with neighbourhoods and communities such as a highly paid professional member a national government might face: quite a task for volunteer laypeople.

The Group Board was made up of fifteen "lay" member directors elected from regional boards, another five which came from the "independent societies" and, though there was the option to appoint up to three "independent professional non-executive directors" (IPNEDs) to the Group Board at any one time, only one was ever appointed.

All Group Board members (excluding IPNEDs) were appointed by competitive regional election – in contrast, most building societies and PLCs have a nominations committee consisting of members of the executive which picks potential board members and puts them up for uncontested elections.

A series of regional boards, consisting of twelve to fifteen people elected from area committees, were responsible for holding the Group Board to account and for block-voting at the Annual General Meeting. There were 48 area committees which were responsible for representing member interests and promoting membership within their constituency.

Out of the millions of members that the Group had, only area committee members were able to vote in the elections for the regional boards and "lay" director seats on the Group Board and the votes were weighted depending on the value of sales within individual areas.

One of the justifications for this complex governance arrangement was that it took a number of years to reach regional board level, which helped to minimise the influence of single-issue campaigners and carpet-baggers. In the 1990s it was these issues, notably the failed take-over by Andrew Regan in 1997, which caused significant problems for the, then, CRS and CWS.

The Myners Review noted that "the primary source of power within the Group [was] firmly entrenched at the level of the Regional Boards", replicating the roles of the predecessor regional societies in voting a century before, and the review concluded that it was this 'labyrinthine' structure, where Group Board members need to remain elected to Area Committees and regional boards, which led to the governance problems at the Co-op and its financial crisis of 2013.

== Dividend and membership scheme ==
The idea of co-operative trading revolutionised food retailing with the dividend, often known as "divi", and the "divi number" became a part of British life. The way in which co-operative retail societies are run for the benefit, and on behalf of their members sets them apart from their modern-day competitors. The dividend is a financial reward to members based on each member's level of trade with the society. The distribution of profits on the basis of turnover rather than capital invested is a fundamental difference between a co-operative and most private sector enterprises.

=== History of co-op membership ===
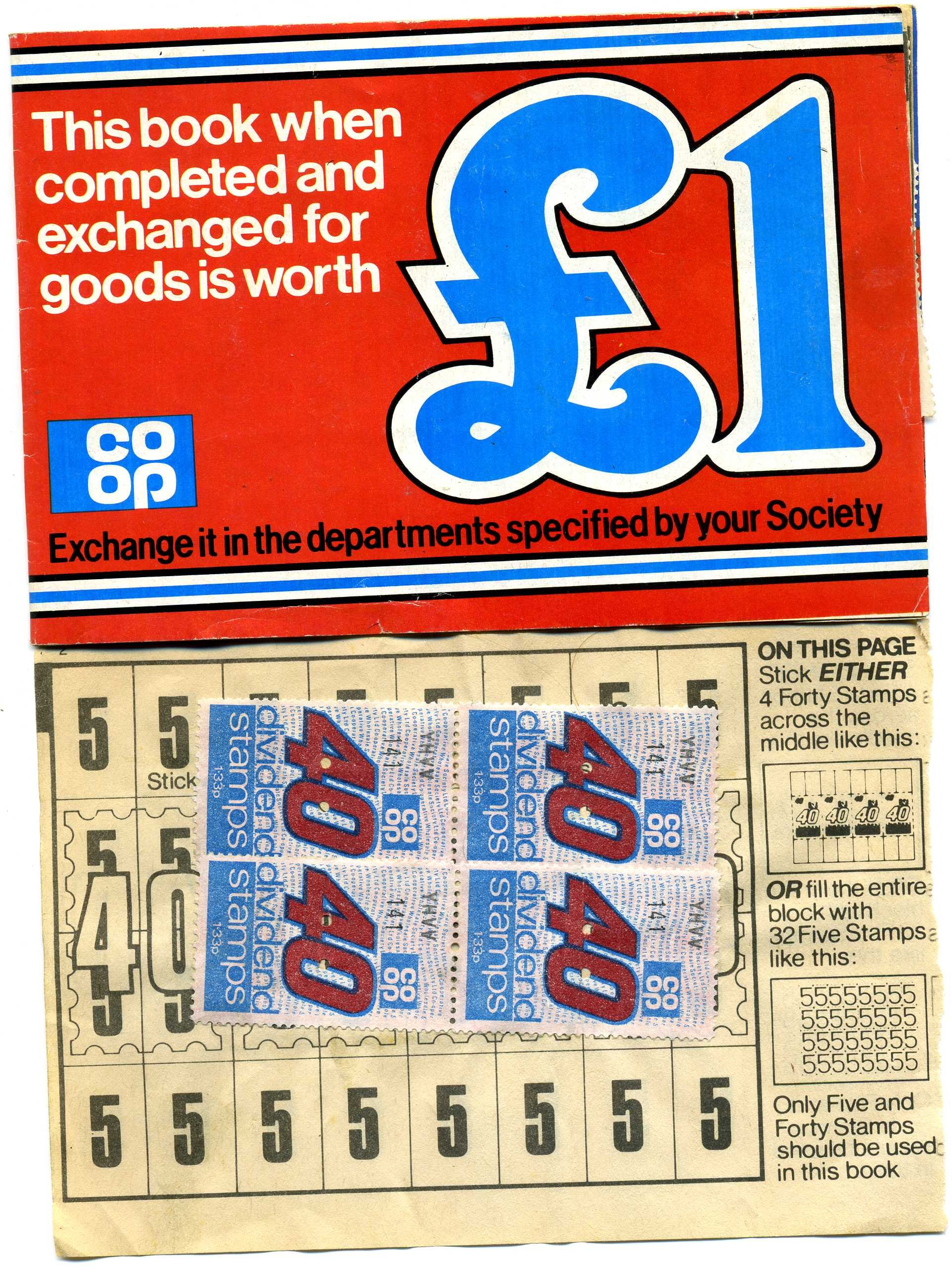
Co-op savings stamp book, 1980s

Historically, members' sales would be recorded in ledgers in society's stores and at the end of the collection period a proportional payment would be made to the member. As the societies grew, and the number of members increased, the method of using ledgers became cumbersome. As a solution, some societies, including Co-operative Retail Services, issued stamps to members for qualifying transactions. Members collected stamps on a savings card and, when the card was complete, would use it as payment for goods or deposit into their share account.

By the late 20th century the group's predecessors and then the Co-operative Group no longer paid true dividend as it had become a drain on limited resources, although several independent societies (such as Anglia Regional) continued to do so. In the mid-1990s a loyalty card scheme, in the style of the Tesco Clubcard, was introduced which used the dividend brand. These loyalty cards were inspired by the co-operative dividend but were little more than marketing exercises and a way to gather useful customer information. Co-operative customers, not just members, could sign up and receive a swipe card to record purchases with vouchers sent out twice a year which could be exchanged for cash or goods.

In September 2006 the Co-operative Group relaunched "true" dividend whereby a proportion of the profits of the Co-operative Group is returned to members. To emphasise the change, the scheme is now called the Co-operative Membership and members earn a "share of the profits". New members are recruited by allowing them to deduct the refundable subscription for a £1 share from their first dividend. Members can collect points to increase their share of the profits by using the services provided across the whole family of businesses. In 2008, the dividend almost doubled to £38 million, equivalent to 2.63p per point (one point being earned for each £1 food purchase), reflecting an 8% increase in underlying profit.

Group membership increased sharply in the first year after the relaunch, to 2.5 million with many more young people who have an affinity with the co-operative values and principles attracted to join.

In 2007, the Oxford-based Midcounties Co-operative became an affinity partner of the group's membership scheme, allowing its members to earn dividend at Co-operative Group stores and vice versa. Since then, other independent co-operatives have joined the reciprocal membership dividend scheme, including Central England Co-operative (merged from Anglia and Midlands who joined in 2008 and 2010 respectively), Southern Co-operative (2009) and Chelmsford Star Co-operative Society (2009). Southern Co-operative withdrew from the affinity partnership scheme in 2021. This reciprocal membership agreement means members of these societies can earn membership points at more than 90% of UK co-operative outlets. Dividend payments are made at the rate of the society where the points were earned, not the society of the member, although the member's society is responsible for distributing the payment.

=== Current membership scheme ===
The current Co-op membership scheme was launched in September 2016 and rewarded members with 5% of what they spent on own-brand products and services being credited back to their membership account. A further 1% was donated to a local charitable or community cause which the members help to select. Additionally, it is expected that members will still earn their share of the profits when the member dividend returns. Though the independent societies have not participated in the 5+1% scheme, members can earn the points (from which the profit share is derived) at five of the largest consumer's co-operatives within the UK owing to the reciprocal membership scheme (described above).

On 30 September 2020, the Co-op changed some of the rewards associated with membership. This increased the community reward to 2% but reduced the member reward from 5% to 2%; the change still calculates rewards when Co-op branded goods are bought. An app was also launched which allows immediate discounts and offers to be activated, exclusively for members. This has since been changed with members no longer receiving rewards for buying Co-op branded goods. Instead members receive discounts off selected branded and own-brand goods.

== Ethical trading and campaigning ==
As the UK's largest co-operative, the group plays a key part in the co-operative movement. In the 1840s the original co-op shops were set up to protect consumers from adulterated food and profiteering shopkeepers. Since then the co-operative movement has campaigned on a number of issues which they thought were key consumer interests. As a part of this, The Co-operative Group has long been campaigning for consumer rights legislation, researching into new food labelling initiatives, a major sponsor of new co-operative ventures, a notable donor to community initiatives, directly involved in the development of animal welfare standards and in championing Fairtrade in the UK.

The Co-op has traded on its 'ethical' credentials for many years and in 2014 a survey suggested that 70% of the British public believed that it was a business that 'tried to do the right thing'. The co-op is particularly known for its work in championing the introduction of Fairtrade in the UK, investing in renewable energy and in reducing its carbon emissions, in maintaining high standards of animal welfare, in being a leading retailer of responsible fish, for reinvesting its profits in local communities and for campaigning on a range of social issues.

The Co-operative is widely recognised for its commitment to responsible and ethical trading, particularly for championing fairtrade in the UK. These commitments and its mutual structure led to The Co-operative Food being awarded Ethical Consumer magazine's 'Best Buy' status in 2011 and 2014. Following significant public outcry regarding the Tax avoidance of many well known multi-national companies the co-op was awarded the Fair Tax Mark in 2015, an independent certification designed to identify businesses which are not aggressively seeking to avoid paying taxes.

Each year the business publishes a sustainability report on its website with a breakdown of the key social, environmental and charitable activities which were undertaken during the previous financial year. In 2008 the company was awarded the European Business Award for the Environment (Management category) by the European Union for its commitment to combine competitiveness with respect for the environment.

=== Fairtrade ===
The Co-operative Group was the first major UK retailer to stock Fairtrade products and was the first UK supermarket to sell Fairtrade coffee (1992), bananas (2000), own-brand chocolate (2000), own-brand wine (2001), pineapples (2002), sugar (2005) and blueberries (2010). Since then, all own brand block chocolate (2002), coffee (2003), sugar (2008), bananas (2012), winter blueberries (2012) has been converted to Fairtrade. Co-op Food is also the largest UK retailer of fairly traded wine and has the largest range of Fairtrade products in the UK. In 2014 its Fairtrade sales were £133M. During 2017, the Co-op became the first UK retailer to source all of the cocoa for their own label products on Fairtrade terms, a move which increased their volumes of Fairtrade cocoa fivefold.

The Co-op's "Beyond Fairtrade" programme is run in addition to paying the standard 'Fairtrade Premium' payment. The programme has included working with many groups of smallholder farmers to establish democratic co-operative businesses to sell their product (to suppliers including the Co-op) and through the Co-op providing investment funding to enable the farming co-operatives who supply them to convert to Fairtrade certification. £475,000 in funding was provided between 2012 and 2014 for this programme. The business has also been involved in developing certification schemes for additional Fairtrade products (in association with the Fairtrade Foundation and Traidcraft) including wine (2001), rubber gloves (2014), coffins (2012) and charcoal (2009).

=== Renewable energy and energy saving measures ===
Since 2005, 98% of The Co-op's electricity has been sourced through renewable sources, notably wind power, hydro and anaerobic digestion. By 2014, 12.3% of the business's total energy use was being sourced from renewable sources. The business has also constructed its own renewable energy generation facilities, including three wind farms, though these were sold in 2016. When combined with improvements in its supply chain, notably a reduction in fuel used in its vehicle fleet, and the fitting of doors to its store refrigerators (a measure which reduces their energy consumption by 40%) this led to a 40% reduction in its carbon emissions between 2006 and 2015. The Co-op also buys renewable energy from community energy projects including Torrs Hydro and Settle Hydro.

=== Animal welfare ===
In 1994, The Co-operative Group became the first retailer to participate in the RSPCA Freedom Food animal welfare scheme. It also imposes a range of animal welfare standards for suppliers of its own-brand chicken, pork, and turkey products that exceed UK legal requirements. The Co-op labels the living conditions of egg-laying hens and became the first retailer to use only free-range eggs in all own-brand products. In 2024, it joined a letter with other major UK food companies and Compassion in World Farming calling on the UK government to ban cages for laying hens.

In 2025, following discussions with the International Council for Animal Welfare (ICAW) and the Aquatic Life Institute (ALI), as well as public attention to crustacean welfare, the Co-op ended the practice of eyestalk ablation in its shrimp supply chain.

In 2013, the Co-op was awarded a Tier 2 standard by the Business Benchmark on Farm Animal Welfare. It was specifically recognized for banning the prophylactic use of antibiotics and artificial substances for promoting abnormal animal growth in all own-brand products. The Co-op states that it allows antibiotics to be administered "with the specific written approval of a vet to address a specific health threat." It also limits livestock transportation time to no more than 6 hours.

=== Responsible fish sourcing ===
The Co-operative is one of the leading retailers of responsible fish in the UK having launched its Responsible Fish Sourcing Policy in 2008 after commissioning research in association with NGOs, academics and its suppliers. This report was subsequently updated in 2014. The Co-operative Food was commended by the Marine Conservation Society with a "gold award" (2011) and a "silver award" (2013) and, for its sourcing policy, The Co-operative was one of five organisations accredited with the 2010 Seafood Champion Award.

Since 2011 all own-brand tuna has been caught using the pole and line method and does not use "Fish Aggregation Devices", a method with a significantly lower by-catch rate when compared with conventional tuna fishing. Since 2012, all farmed salmon has been certified by the RSPCA Freedom Foods accreditation scheme. In 2008 the Co-op committed £200,000 to enable fisheries which would struggle to fund the certification process to become accredited by the Marine Stewardship Council.

In 2015 the Co-op became one of the first retailers to join the "Ocean Disclosure Project" which requires the business to report transparently on the geographic locations, fishing methods and sustainability characteristics of all of the fisheries from which they source. This move confirmed an ongoing commitment by The Co-operative Food in promoting transparent and responsible fishing in the UK.

=== Community dividend ===
Like many co-operatives, The Co-operative Group runs a community dividend scheme where each year a share of the businesses profits are re-invested into the communities where they trade. In 2002 the group gave 5.4 per cent of their annual operative profits to communities as their community dividend for the year – a total figure of £10.7M.

=== Co-operative development ===
The Co-operative Group, like most co-operatives, has supported the development of co-operative businesses in many sectors of the economy through its "Enterprise Hub". This has provided financial and business management help to small and start-up co-operatives, notably including F.C. United of Manchester, public service mutuals and a number of community pub ventures.

=== Clean energy campaigning ===
Between 2011 and 2013 the group campaigned on the issue of climate change under its banner of "The Clean Energy Revolution". There were three main aspects to this campaigning:

1. Campaigning to increase awareness of climate change generally;
2. Campaigning specifically around contentions associated with fossil fuel extraction; and
3. Assisting the development of community renewable energy projects in the UK.

In addition to this, the business has provided on targets to reducing its own environmental impact including reducing direct GHG emissions by 50% relative to 2006.

As a part of its attempts to highlight the problem of climate change and specific issues relating to fossil fuel extraction, the group campaigned against tar sands oil extraction and fracking. To this end, The Co-operative Group part-funded the UK release of films including Chasing Ice, Gasland and H2Oil to raise awareness of the cause and, as a part of this, local members organised screenings in various communities. In 2011 the Co-op wrote an open letter to the Defra which was signed by 190 large organisations and businesses calling upon the government to introduce mandatory carbon emissions reporting – a measure introduced for "businesses listed on the Main Market of the London Stock Exchange" in 2013.

The Toxic Fuels campaign was launched to combat the proposed expansion of the Canadian tar sands and proposals to begin fracking at sites in the UK. In 2008 they joined with the WWF-UK to publish a report which concluded that exploiting the Canadian tar sands to their full potential would be sufficient to bring about what they described as "runaway climate change". The Co-operative Bank were also vocal supporters of the Beaver Lake Cree Nation's legal action against expanding oil extraction in Alberta, raising and donating over C$400,000 to support the BLCN legal case and focusing media attention in the UK – which led to a protest outside the Canadian Embassy in London. Colin Baines, Campaigns Manager at The Co-operative Group described the Beaver Lake Cree Nation legal action as "perhaps the best chance we have to stop tar sands expansion". In 2013, the court ruled in favour of the Beaver Lake Cree on appeal.

The Co-op were also involved in shareholder resolutions at BP and Shell's 2010 AGM over this issue of tar sands extraction. A further report published with the WWF was critical of the prospect of carbon capture and storage (CCS) technology being used to reduce the release of carbon dioxide into the atmosphere to a level comparable to that of other methods of oil extraction. In the report they claimed that it was this belief in CCS that the oil industry were using to justify their continued investment in the tar sands.

In 2011, The Co-operative Group called for a moratorium on fracking in the UK "at least until all the associated risks are fully exposed and understood". This position was based upon a report which the Co-op commissioned and which was produced by the Tyndall Centre for Climate Change Research. The report concluded that the implementation of fracking in the UK posed three potential problems:

1. the likelihood of increased greenhouse gas emissions;
2. the potential for contamination of groundwater by heavy metals and chemicals used in the hydraulic fracturing process; and
3. the diversion of investment funds away from renewable energy research and development.

Another Co-op funded report concluded that the hypothesised emissions benefits from converting from coal to gas (from fracking) had been overstated. As a part of their attempts to increase public awareness of fracking in the UK, the Co-op encouraged members to organise screenings of the film Gasland across the UK. This move received some criticism, notably from The Daily Telegraph due to perceptions of bias in the film Gasland.

The Co-operative Group has been a vocal supporter of community-owned renewable projects for a number of years as a way to combat climate change and fuel poverty. In 2012, the Co-op launched its "Community Energy Manifesto" in association with Co-operatives UK which contained research into the possibility for significant growth in the UK's community renewable sector and it provided a number of case studies. The Co-operative Group, notably through The Co-operative Bank and The Co-operative Enterprise Hub, has provided almost £100M in loans and grants to community-run energy efficiency and renewable energy generation co-operatives (including the Baywind Energy Co-operative and Torrs Hydro). In 2014 the Co-op launched its Community Energy Challenge which worked to encourage community energy schemes across the UK by actively supporting the groups for 18 months to raise awareness of community renewables and to create co-operatively and community-owned and schemes of over 500 kW in size that could be replicated across the country. However, since the problems at The Co-operative Bank the funding for new projects has largely been discontinued.

=== Food and product labelling ===
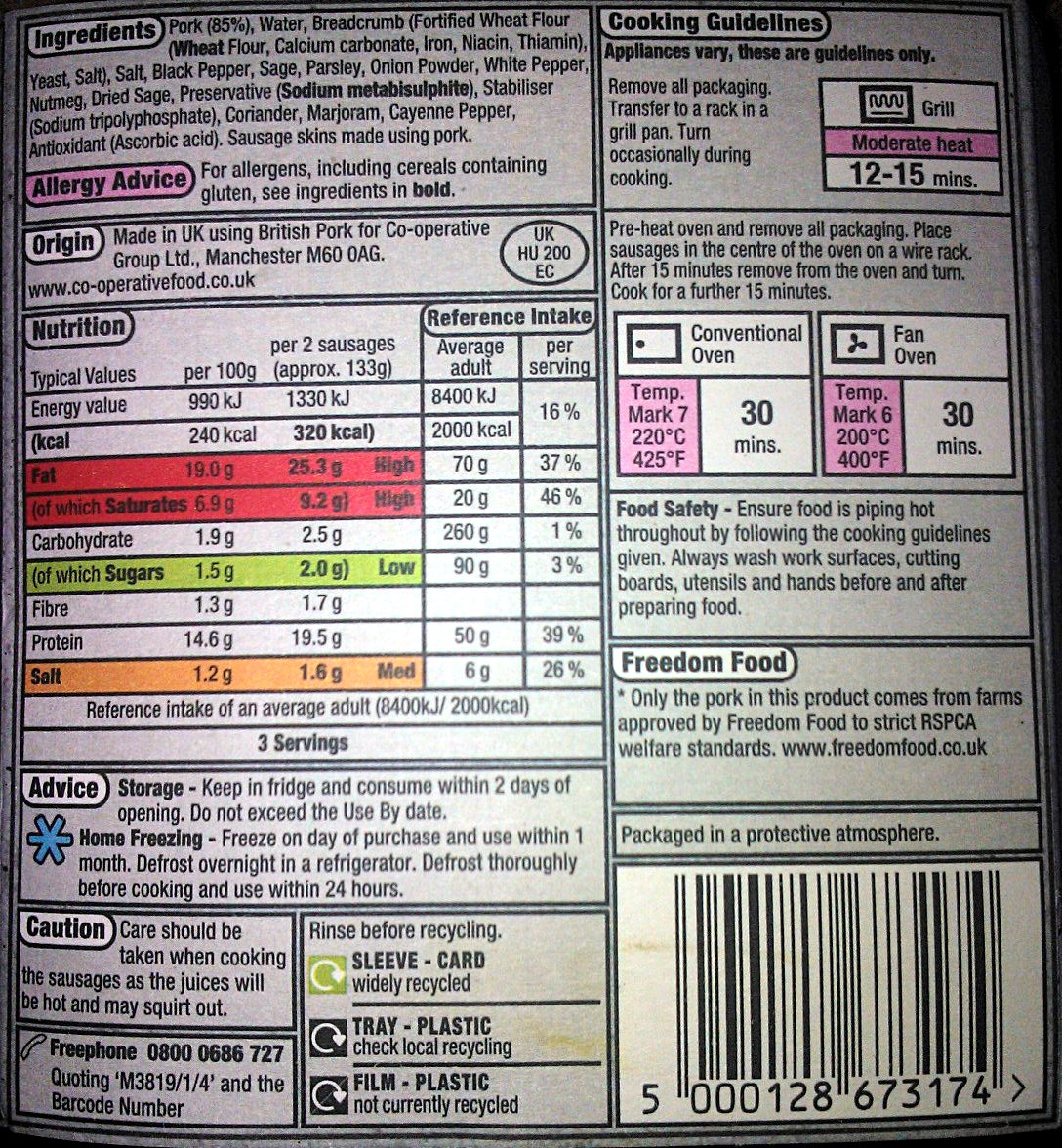
The rear nutritional information panel for a pack of own brand sausages

The Co-operative Group became the first retailer to list the ingredients in its own-brand wines on the label in 1999 in a move that was illegal at the time. They justified their move by stating that they "believe it's in the consumer's interest" to know what is in their wine – as many ingredients, including charcoal and fish finings, have been used to give wines distinctive flavours. Ten years later the UK government pushed for labelling of this kind.

In 2001, the group became the first retailer to include Braille writing on its range of medicines and alcoholic drinks. By 2015 this had expanded so Braille could be found on many products, including breakfast cereals.

In 2013, the Co-operative Group modified their own front-of-pack labelling scheme to combine both the traffic light and guideline daily amount schemes into one system. In 2009 the Co-op also introduced a 'green dot' scheme where additional specifically defined nutritional benefits in products (e.g. over 6 g of fibre per 100 g) were included on the front of the pack. Since 2003, the Co-op has been using a similar system to highlight products which count towards one's '5 a day' fruit and veg – also listing the quantity of the product which required to reach the required serving size.

=== Country boycotts ===
At the end of April 2012, The Co-operative Group announced that it was "no longer engaging with any supplier of produce known to be sourcing from Israeli settlements." This involved ending contracts amounting to around £350,000 with a number of companies sourcing products from settlements built on Palestinian claimed territories, but not Israeli companies in general.

Following the 2022 Russian invasion of Ukraine the Co-op halted the sale of Russian products.

In 2025, the board decided to stop purchasing produce from 17 countries where human rights or international laws were being violated, including Iran, Somalia and Afghanistan. Weeks prior to this, members had agreed to remove Israeli goods entirely from stores, during their annual general meeting in London on 19 May 2025. 73 percent of members supported the motion.

=== Pesticides and toxic chemicals ===
In 2000, the Group introduced a pesticide policy which banned, restricted and monitored pesticide use at farms which supply its own brand products. The policy aims to minimise the use of chemicals, and the residues which remain on crops, whilst providing safe food but without notably increasing the cost of products, a move which was endorsed by consumer and environmental groups. This move resulted from research that the business, then the CWS, conducted which demonstrated that two-thirds of those asked were either concerned or very concerned about the health and environmental effects of pesticides and their residues on foods. The Co-op was the first supermarket to publicise all monitoring pesticide results on the business's website so that members could access the data. The Co-op publish the results of their monthly pesticide monitoring on their website and this indicates that between 2009 and 2015 on average approximately 40% of tested foods had no traces of any of the 449 monitored pesticides and that since 2012 none of the banned pesticides have been observed. After recognising the potential for bioaccumulation of the toxic chemicals used in manufacturing and agriculture, the group joined with the WWF-UK on a campaign called DETOX which called for research into new safer chemicals which do no bioaccumulate.

The Co-operative became the first UK supermarket to ban the use of neonicotinoid pesticides in any of their own brand products or on their farms in 2009, after Germany, Italy and Slovenia banned the chemicals in 2008 in response to a sharp decline in their country's bee population. The business invested over £300,000 in funding peer-reviewed research on the impact of neonicotinoids on bee populations, campaigned for a ban of neonicotinoids and called on the UK government to support the proposed EU ban in 2013. They suggested that if they, then the UK's largest farmer, had banned neonicotinoids in their products and on their farms four years earlier, then it would be possible for the ban to be successfully implemented without significant impact on European farming. As a part of their 'Plan Bee' policy they also funded the UK release of the documentary film Vanishing of the Bees to raise awareness of the issue, gave away 300,000 packets of wildflower seeds to members, offered discounted bee boxes for sale to members and under-used urban areas into colourful community meadows.

=== Genetic modification ===
In 1994, the Co-operative Group began labelling own brands food which contained genetically modified (GM) ingredients and, five years later, they banned the use of GM ingredients in its own-brand products including GM animal feed. Since 2003 the Co-op has banned the growing of GM crops on their own land (at the time they were the largest lowland UK farming business). The group also published a report on genetic modification which suggested that the majority of customers and members did not support GM crops. In 2013 the Co-op dropped its objection to GM chicken and turkey feed and allowed its suppliers to use such feeds, owing to the increasing difficulty in sourcing guaranteed non-GM feeds.

=== Waste reduction and carrier bags ===
Total waste from the business has decreased by 41% since 2006 with 95% of all waste now being either reused or recycled. Product packaging for own brand items has been reduced by 40% since 2006 (by weight). In line with regulations, the Co-op prints information on the recyclability of product packaging on the label. In 2014 over 80% of packaging (by weight – 45% by product line) was widely recyclable.

In 2002, the Co-op launched its degradable carrier bags, however, these were later withdrawn in favour of recyclable and reusable bags. However, with the increasing prevalence of council refuse collection services across the UK which compost food and garden waste, the Co-op launched a new carrier bag in 2014 which could be used to by the customer to line their food waste bin once they had used the bag to get their shopping home. All profits from the sale of the entire carrier bag range (above the legal charge) are distributed to community projects.

The Co-operative distributes food waste to FareShare with the equivalent of 196,000 redistributed in 2014 and no food waste was sent to landfill.

=== Supply chain efficiency ===
The Co-op Food Supply Chain Logistics business makes 35,000 deliveries per week and it has invested heavily in increasing the efficiency of its supply and distribution networks with the aims of reducing its costs and environmental impact. Between 2006 and 2013 the Co-op reduced its fuel consumption by 29% and its emissions from supply chain activities by 31%. In 2013 the society closed six "legacy" distribution centres and opened two new sites which won awards for their low environmental impact. By switching much of its England to Scotland traffic from road to electric train in 2010 it has taken more than 10,000 tonnes of goods from the road network, making a significant greenhouse gas emissions saving. The business has also started collecting goods from its suppliers itself using lorries returning from store deliveries which would otherwise have travelled empty. The business became the first major business to trial an aerodynamic truck, 'the dolphin' in 2013 which was specifically designed to maximise fuel efficiency and reduce costs. The business has also expanded its road fleet into double-decker and 15-metre semi-trailers to reduce the number of lorry journeys required.

=== Palm oil policy ===
Palm oil is significant as it has one of the highest yields per hectare of any oil, however, its production has been linked to significant deforestation and habitat loss, particularly across Africa and South America. In order to reduce this impact The Co-operative became the first major supermarket to commit to only using certified sustainable palm oil in its own brand products. During 2014 the Co-op was awarded 'Best Buy' status by the 'Rainforest Foundation UK' (RFUK) and Ethical Consumer magazine for its use of certified palm oil products and for its palm oil policy. Palm oil for The Co-op is certified by the following standards: UTZ Certified (40%), the use of a segregated supply chain (39%) and with GreenPalm certificates (21%). All of these approaches are supported by the Roundtable on Sustainable Palm Oil of which The Co-operative Group is a member.

=== 2025 cyber incident ===
In April 2025, The Co-op announced that it shut down parts of its IT systems in response to hackers attempting to gain access to them. It initially claimed the "proactive measures" it had taken to fend off the attack had had a "small impact" on its call centre and back office. Co-op later admitted that personal data for all of its 6.5 million members had been stolen by the hackers, and that the incident had cost it £206 million in lost sales.

== List of corporate members ==
As of 2011, 22 independent consumer co-operatives are corporate members or customer-owners, of the group. They invested share capital to found or join the group's wholesaler predecessors, such as the North of England Co-operative Wholesale Industrial and Provident Society and the Scottish Co-operative Wholesale Society. These co-operatives are represented alongside the regional boards at annual meetings and in the board of directors, and are entitled to dividends based on the amount of their purchases from the group.

The corporate members do not have exclusive rights to operate in any category or geography; especially with food there are examples of one or more corporate members below operating in the same local area and/or overlapping with shops of The Cooperative group, and the various websites listed below may or may not highlight categories or store locations relevant to a customer's needs or location.

Society	Website	Founded	Members	Activities (number of outlets)
Allendale	allendalecoop.co.uk	1874	Unknown	Food (1)
Our Co-op	centralengland.coop	1854 and 1876	329,000	Food (255), Funeral (118), Travel (21), Non-food (44), Petrol (25), Florist (10),
Channel Islands	ci-cooperative.com	1919	128,350	Food (16), Non-food (3), Travel (2)
Clydebank	realco-op.co.uk	1881	Unknown	Food (6), Non-food, Funeral, Post Offices
Coniston	conistonco-op.co.uk	1896	Unknown	Food (1)
East of England	eastofengland.coop	1858	350,000	Food (133), Non-food (14), Travel (12), Funeral (30), Pharmacy (8), Motors (3), Jewellery (2), Education Centre (1)Forecourts(5)
Grosmont	http://www.grosmontcoop.co.uk/	1867	Unknown	Food (1)
Heart of England	https://heartofengland.coop/	1832	179,657	Food (33), Non-food (21), Funeral (9), Travel (3), Post Offices (4)
Langdale	https://www.langdalecooperative.co.uk/	1884	Unknown	Food (1)
Lincolnshire	lincolnshire.coop	1861	228,000	Food (84), Bakery (1), Petrol Stations (10), Pharmacies (48), Post Offices (40), Travel (13), Funeral (17), Coffee Shops (2).
Radstock	radstock.coop	1867	Unknown	Food (14), Non-food (1)
Scotmid	scotmid.coop	1859	268,125	Food (129) Funeral (17)
Co-op News		1888		Monthly Print Newspaper (1) Digital Newspaper (1)
Tamworth	tamworth.coop	1886	Unknown	Food (14), Non-Food (1), Funeral (7)

== Awards ==
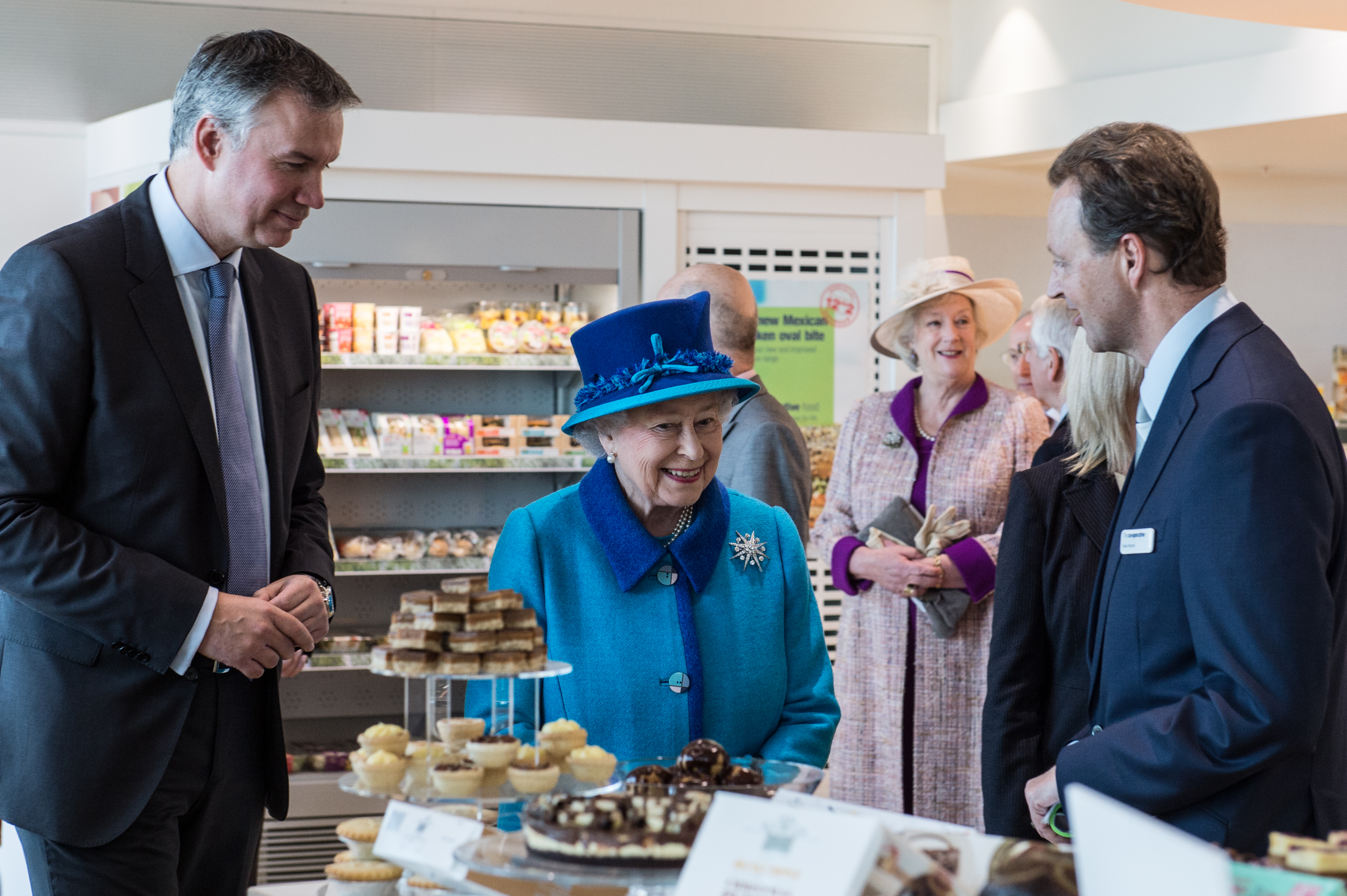
Queen Elizabeth II at the opening of an office declared the "most environmentally-friendly building in the world", November 2013

In 2002, the society gained Worldaware's 2002 Shell Award for Sustainable Development for its use of Fairtrade goods. and in 2007 it won a Queen's Award for Enterprise in the Sustainable Development category, in recognition of its business practices, including its pioneering stance on Fairtrade and the environment. In January 2010, the society appeared on the shortlist for the Transform Awards for rebranding and brand transformation in a number of categories A 2011 Which? survey claimed that the Co-operative was the least favourite grocer with 46% satisfaction among customers compared to Waitrose which achieved 85%.

== See also ==
- British co-operative movement
- The Co-operative brand
