= Holyoake House =

Listed building in Manchester, England

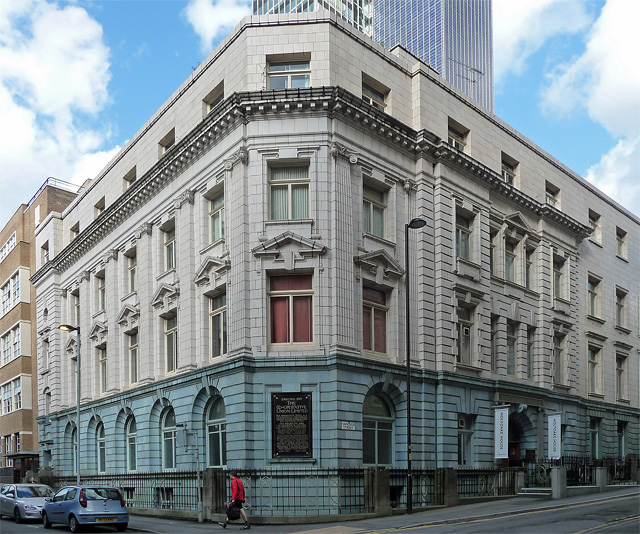

General information
- Address: Hanover Street, Manchester, M4 4AH
- Coordinates: 53.486434°N 2.239353°W
- Named for: George Holyoake
- Completed: 1911
- Owner: Co-operatives UK

Design and construction
- Architect(s): Francis Eldred Lodge Harris
- Designations

Listed Building – Grade II
- Official name: Holyoake House
- Designated: 20 June 1988
- Reference no.: 1291969

Holyoake House is a building in the NOMA district of Manchester, England, which was completed in 1911. Designed by F.E.L. Harris, it was built for the Co-operative Union in memory of George Holyoake. It is located alongside other listed buildings such as the CIS Tower, Hanover Building and Redfern Building and is owned by Co-operatives UK.

== Background ==
In 1906 the co-operative activist George Jacob Holyoake died and the Co-operative Movement decided to commemorate him by building a permanent headquarters for the Co-operative Union. The building was designed by architect F. E. L. Harris, who had also designed the nearby Hanover Building in the year of Holyoake's death. It was erected in 1911 on Hanover Street and named Holyoake House. A plaque was erected outside the building dedicating the building to Holyoake's memory.

In addition to Co-operatives UK, Holyoake House is also home to the Co-operative College, the Association of British Credit Unions (ABCUL), Co-op News, the Woodcraft Folk, which has sometimes identified itself as the youth wing of the co-operative movement, and the Manchester office of The Phone Co-op.

The building was extended in the 1930s, and a training centre on the top floor was destroyed by an incendiary bomb in the Manchester Blitz of 1940. A collection of Holyoake's letters, papers and other writings are held in store in the National Co-operative Archive, also housed in the building, whilst the building itself received Grade II listed building status on 20 June 1988.

== See also ==
- Listed buildings in Manchester-M4
