= Sadler's Yard =

Public square and event space in Manchester, England

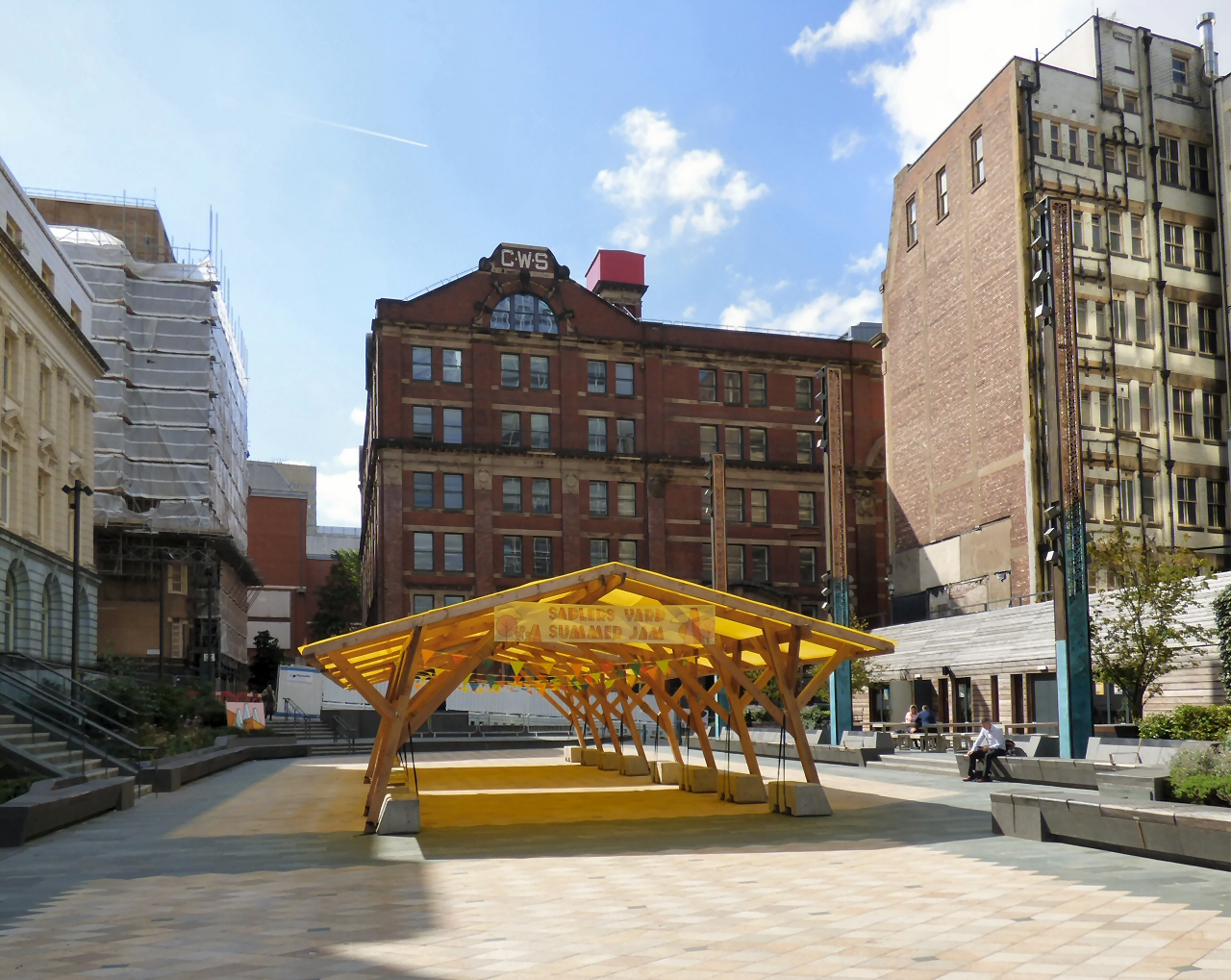
- Sadler's Yard in 2018

- Location within Greater Manchester
- Maintained by: City of Manchester
- Location: Redfern Street, Manchester, England
- Coordinates: 53°29′12.25″N 2°14′23.47″W

Construction
- Completion: 2015; 11 years ago

Sadler's Yard is a public square and event space on Redfern Street in Manchester, England. Opened on 4 December 2015, it was the first new public space to be created in the city centre after Exchange Square in 1996.

It is located within the NOMA mixed-use redevelopment scheme, between the CIS Tower, New Century House and the Hanover Building, opposite Manchester Victoria station.

The square was named after James Sadler, a balloonist, chemist and pastry chef who made the first manned balloon flight from Manchester in 1785. It is one of the first public spaces in Britain to be named through online crowd-sourcing, after members of the public were invited to suggest names for the site via social media.

The new city square was delivered by the Co-operative Group, NOMA and Manchester City Council and was supported by the European Regional Development Fund. It was designed by landscape architects Planit IE, and constructed by contractors Casey.
