= Redfern Building =

Listed building in Manchester, England

Coordinates: 53°29′12″N 2°14′21″W

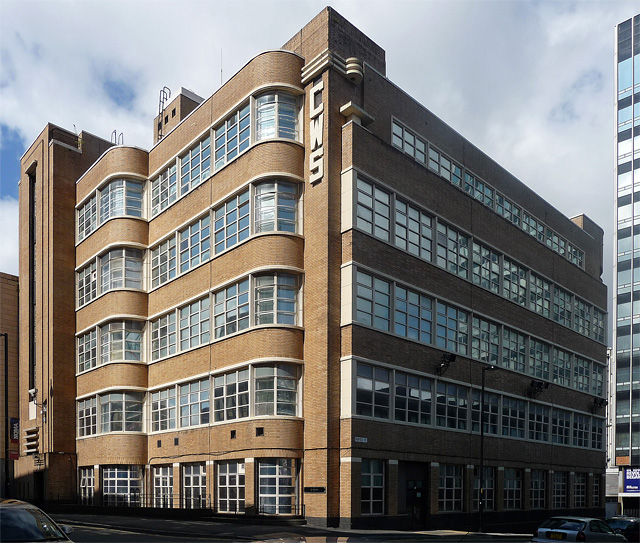
- The Redfern Building

- Location within Greater Manchester

General information
- Type: Office
- Location: Redfern Street, Manchester, England
- Current tenants: National Probation Service
- Completed: 1937

Technical details
- Floor count: 7
- Floor area: 32,195 sq ft (2,991.0 m^{2})

Design and construction
- Architect: W. A. Johnson

Listed Building – Grade II
- Official name: Cooperative Society Building
- Designated: 6 June 1994
- Reference no.: 1247472

The Redfern Building is a Grade II listed structure on Redfern Street in Manchester, England. It also fronts Dantzic Street and Mayes Street, overlooking Sadler's Yard and standing adjacent to the Grade II listed New Century House. Designed by W. A. Johnson and completed in 1937, Redfern was originally constructed for office and warehouse use for the Co-operative Wholesale Society. The building is currently occupied by the National Probation Service and also accommodates commercial office space managed as part of the NOMA estate.

== History ==
Redfern was built for the Co-operative Wholesale Society and is now part of the Co-operative Estate in Manchester which includes a number of listed 20th-century buildings such as the CIS Tower and Hanover Building.

On 6 June 1994, Refern was designated as a Grade II listed building.

From April 2017 until November 2018, Redfern housed PLANT, an open design studio and workshop for Manchester.

The building was comprehensively refurbished during 2018–2019 by Sheppard Robson architects.

In 2020 it was announced that Redfern would become the flagship office for the Ministry of Justice's National Probation Service, under a 10-year lease.

== Design ==
The seven-storey building has a flat roof and is built of pale brown brick. A prominent service tower rises on its north side.

The building shows affinities with the 1930s Art Deco movement and is inspired by Dutch Brick modernism, according to Nikolaus Pevsner. Redfern was designed by W. A. Johnson.

In Pevsner (2001), architecture critic Clare Hartwell observed that "it is a pity that this [building] does not enjoy a better site - its impact is partly lost due to its towering neighbours and its relationship with the adjoining Holyoake House."
