= One Angel Square =

Office building in Manchester, England

Coordinates: 53.4880°N 2.2373°W

- The Co-operative Group Building
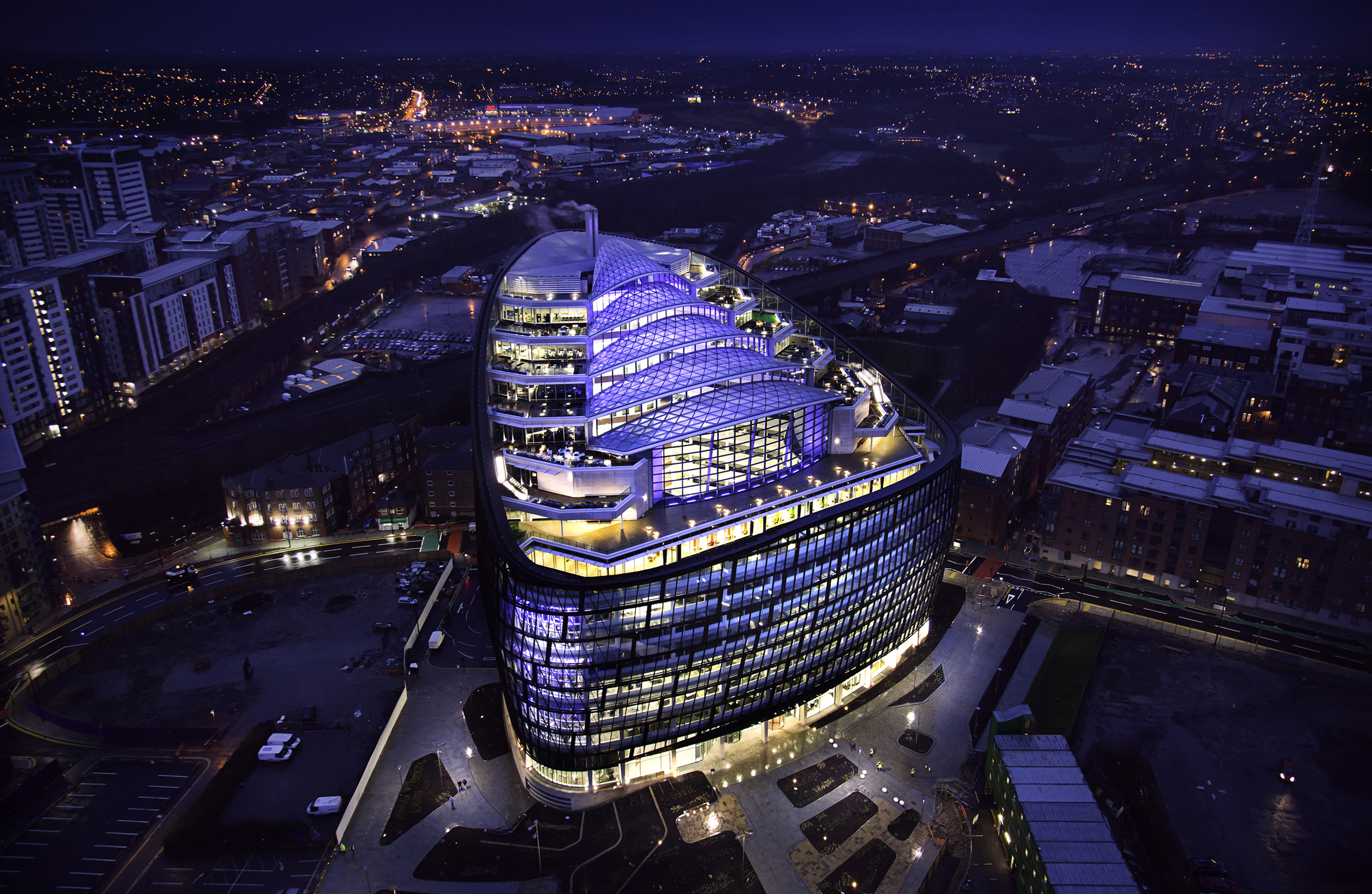
- One Angel Square from the adjacent CIS Tower

General information
- Status: Completed
- Type: High-rise office
- Architectural style: Contemporary / Sustainable architecture
- Location: NOMA, Manchester, Greater Manchester, England, One Angel Square; Manchester; M60 0AG
- Current tenants: The Co-operative Group
- Construction started: 16 July 2010
- Completed: March 2013
- Inaugurated: 14 November 2013
- Cost: £105 million (build cost); £142 million (2013 sale cost)
- Owner: DWS; Gingko Investments (2013–2038)

Height
- Height: 72.5 m (238 ft)

Technical details
- Structural system: Three concrete cores; steel / glass frame
- Floor count: 14

Design and construction
- Architect: 3DReid
- Structural engineer: Buro Happold (structural, MEP, and fire engineering); Waagner Biro (double skin façade)
- Other designers: Mecanoo and Royal Haskoning (landscape architect)
- Main contractor: BAM Construction; Gardiner & Theobold
- Awards: See below

One Angel Square is a high-rise office building in Manchester, England. Construction work began in 2010 and was completed in February 2013. The landmark building is the head office of the Co-operative Group. Standing 72.5 metres (238 ft) tall, the building forms the centrepiece of the £800 million NOMA development in the Angel Meadow area of Manchester city centre. The building cost at least £105 million to construct and was sold on leaseback terms in 2013 for £142 million.

One Angel Square is one of the most sustainable large buildings in Europe and is built to a BREEAM 'Outstanding' rating. It is powered by a biodiesel cogeneration plant using rapeseed oil to provide electricity and heat. The structure makes use of natural resources, maximising passive solar gain for heat and using natural ventilation through its double-skin façade, adiabatic cooling, rainwater harvesting, greywater recycling and waste heat recycling.

The building's distinctive form has been compared to a sliced egg and a ship. Its design was announced by architects 3DReid in May 2009 and construction began in July 2010, with a projected completion date in March 2013. In December 2012, the scheme surpassed its pan-European sustainability aims and achieved a world-record BREEAM score of 95.32%. It is also an energy-plus building, producing surplus energy and zero carbon emissions. The building has received numerous awards for its striking aesthetic and sustainability aims.

== History ==
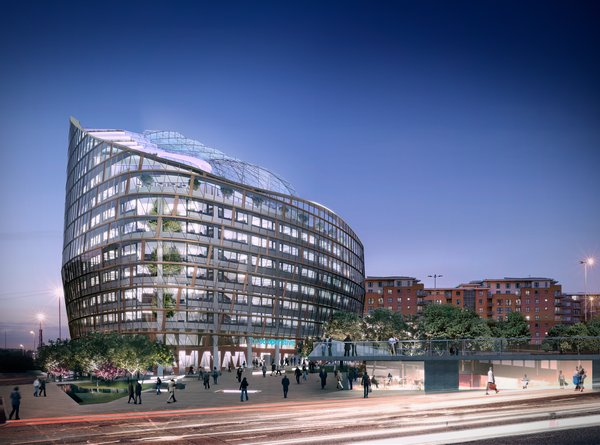
A CGI image of the proposed design, announced in May 2009.

=== Background ===
The Co-operative Group announced plans to move from its headquarters on Miller Street and Corporation Street to a new site in the Greater Manchester area in 2008. From 2008 to 2011, the group grew strongly according to CEO Peter Marks, membership doubled to six million and revenue and profits also doubled. Takeovers of Somerfield and the Britannia Building Society fuelled impetus for new head offices to accommodate the growth.

In December 2008, the group announced it would remain in Manchester city centre and would regenerate land opposite its Miller Street base. The new building is close to Angel Meadow, the site of a 19th-century slum once described by Friedrich Engels as "hell on earth". Archaeologists conducted a survey in 2010, which continued into 2012.

The CIS Tower and the Co-operative Bank's Balloon Street headquarters were unaffected by the development. New Century Hall, home to Co-operative Food, the Dantzic, Hanover, Redfern and Federation Buildings were subsequently vacated and renovated for let.

In 2011, the Co-operative announced the NOMA (North of Manchester city centre) project, to regenerate a 20 acres (8.1 ha) site with office, retail, residential and hotel space to encourage visitors from the city centre. Manchester City Council contributed £20m to the project as an incentive for redevelopment.

In December 2011, the Co-operative announced its new headquarters would be known as One Angel Square.

=== Construction ===
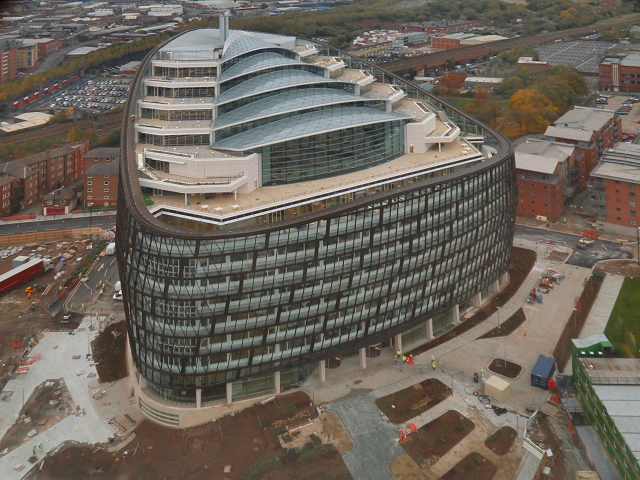
One Angel Square as viewed from the CIS Tower nearing completion in October 2012.

Unicol House, on Miller Street, the former home of The United Yeast Company Limited, was demolished.

Construction work began in July 2010, soon after planning permission was granted. The first task was installing the 539 pile foundations - each at an average depth of 18 m (59 ft). Work soon began on assembling the 3,300 tonnes of steel and 1,948 coffered concrete floor slabs which make up the structure of the building. BAM Construction was the main building contractor with cost management, project management and CDM coordination provided by Gardiner & Theobald. Specialist services were supplied by Buro Happold for structural and fire engineering and Austrian-based Waagner Biro was commissioned to build the double skin façade. The structure was digitally modelled by BAM before commencing assembly and construction to improve safety and create a building schedule thus saving time during the construction process.

More than 4,000 workers from over 90 companies were involved in the building's construction, making it the largest building site outside South East England. The building was topped out in November 2011 and work began assembling the bronze-coloured diagonal panels of the exterior façade. The panels were installed using roped access techniques.

An estimated £17m of building materials out of the total £100m cost was locally sourced, reducing embodied energy and minimising environmental impact. Mecanoo and Manchester-based Royal Haskoning designed the landscape in front of the building.

=== Inauguration and opening ===
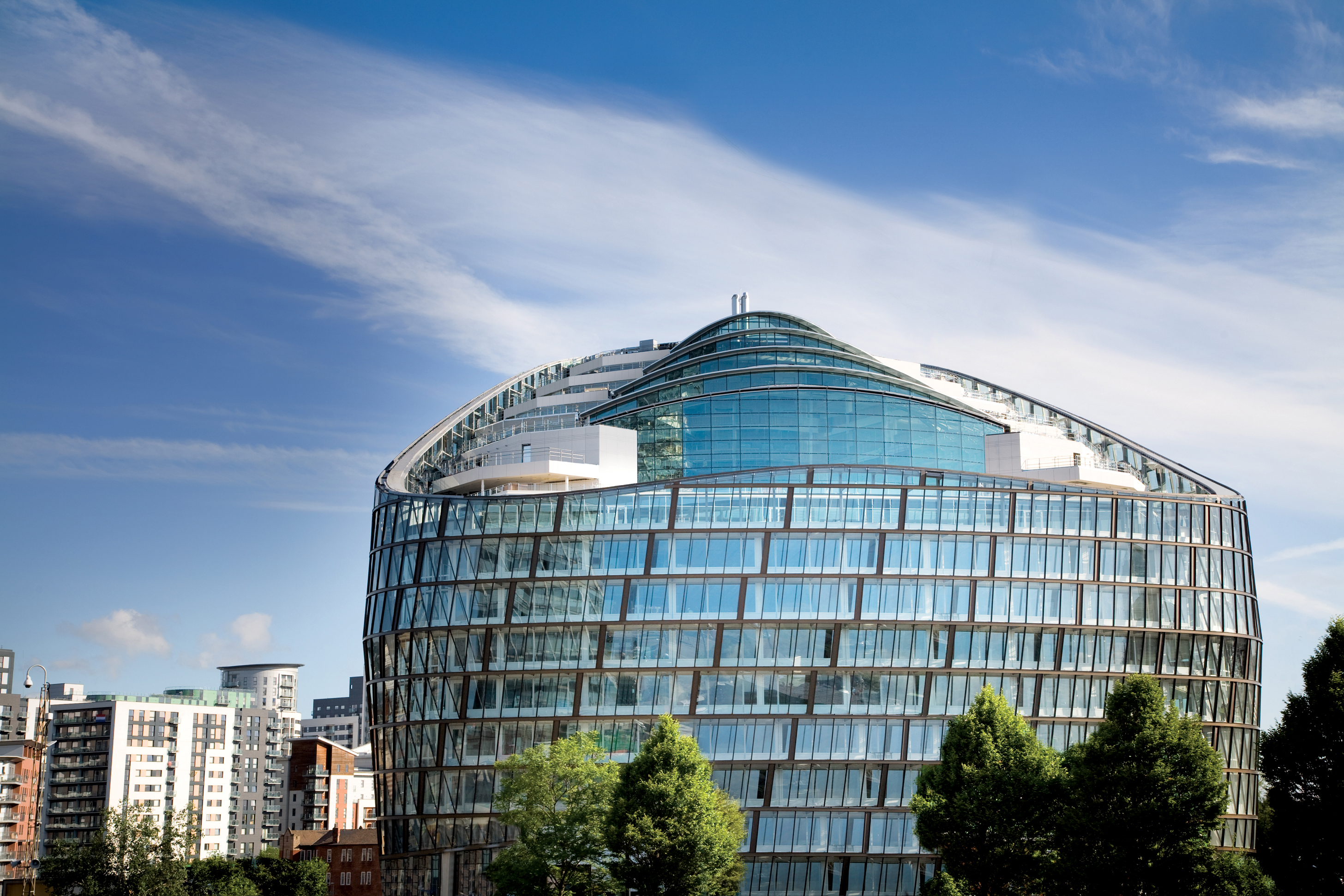
South façade

Construction and fitting out was originally scheduled for completion in September 2012, however opening was postponed to 2013 due to delays in the fitting out process. In July 2012, the Co-operative Group announced One Angel Square was on the market for £150 million on leaseback terms so it could gain capital to invest in Phase Two of the NOMA development. The leaseback sale attracted nine bids from six continents. In February 2013, the Group sold the building for £142 million to DWS and Gingko Tree Investments, an investment arm backed by the Chinese sovereign wealth fund.

== Architecture ==
CGI images of the building with future site context
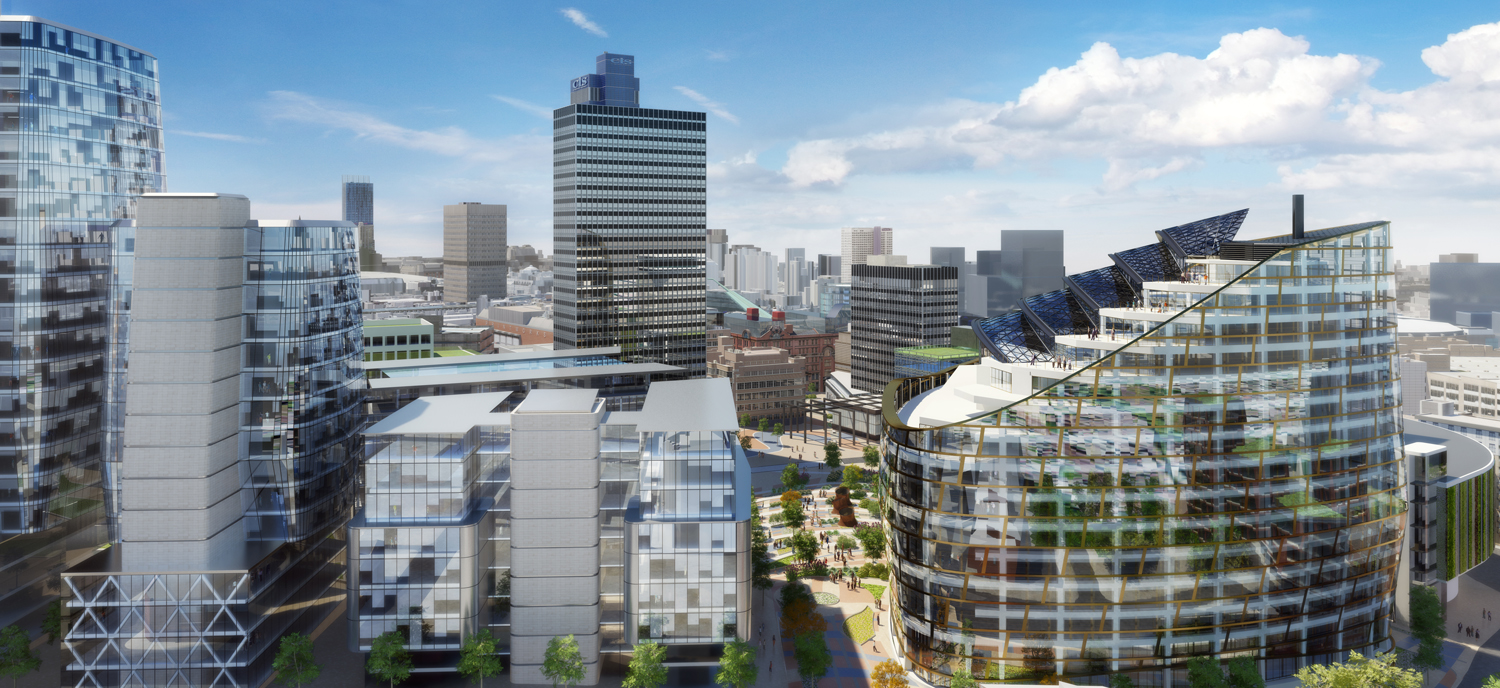
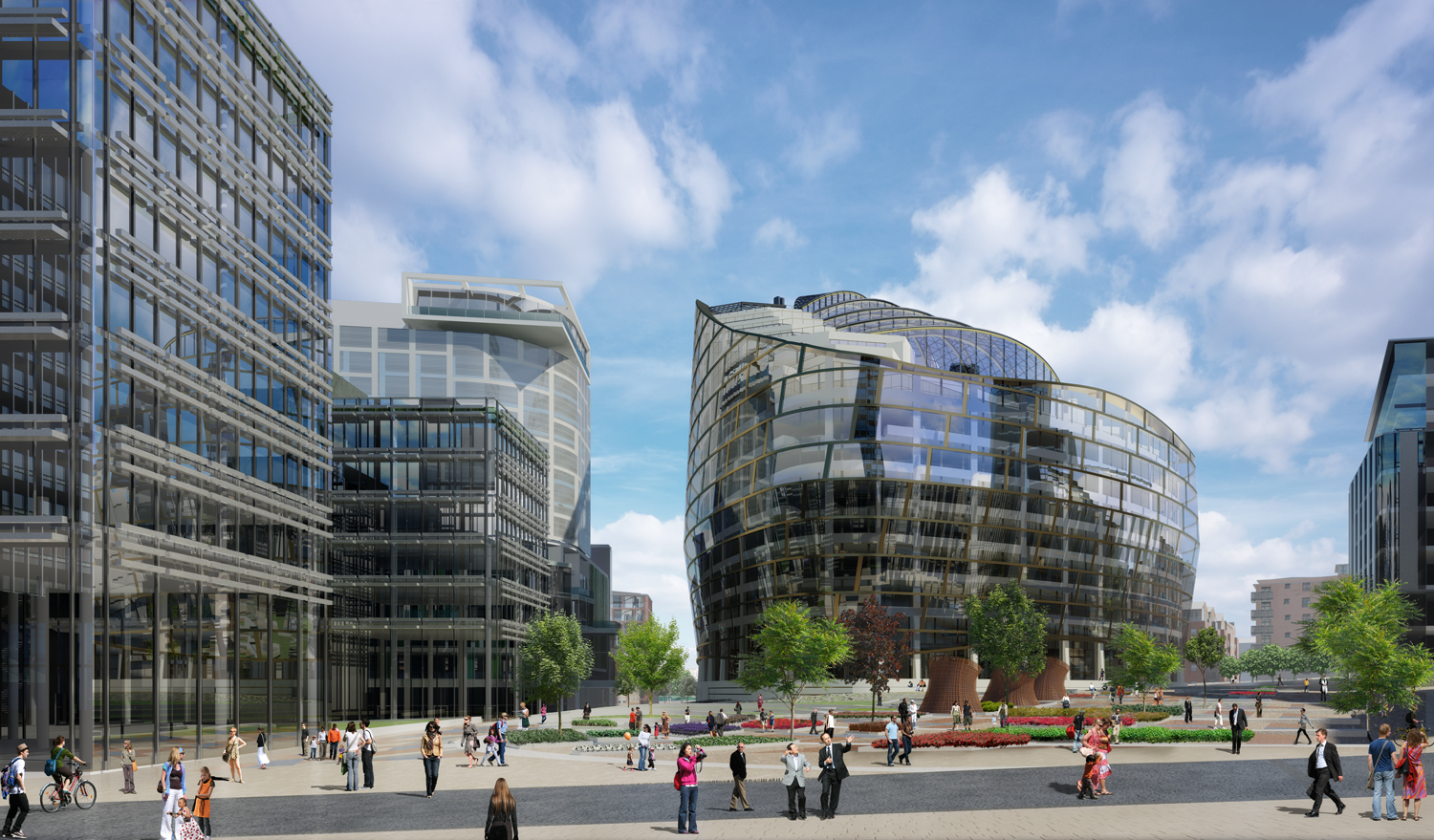
The NOMA development around One Angel Square is due to be completed by 2027. An international architecture competition was launched in 2011.

The Manchester division of 3DReid designed the building with a brief to create a green, landmark building for the city. The building's distinctive form was conceived in a notebook sketch by the lead architect for the building, Mike Hitchmough. The form was refined and developed, before being unveiled to the public in May 2009.

The building's interior primarily consists of open plan space and can accommodate up to 4,000 staff. The building has 327,643 sq ft (30,439.0 m^{2}) of total space – approximately 29,000 sq ft (2,700 m^{2}) per floor. In keeping with the building's green credentials, employees are encouraged to use public transport or cycle to work. Facilities have been created to encourage cycling by providing 105 cycle stands.

=== Form ===
The form of the building is based on a beehive, a symbol long associated with the Co-operative movement and used on its buildings. It has been nicknamed the 'sliced egg' because of its distinctive shape. A focal point is the diagonal slice which creates a nine-floor high atrium with its glass roof tilted towards the south, maximising daylight and passive solar gain. The structure has three internal concrete cores in the form of an equilateral triangle. Steel was utilised as the building main material; its strength allows for large column-free floors needed in an open plan building.

The building's exterior has a double skin façade, with a cavity between its inner windows and the outer glass panel structure. The double skin façade is for sustainability and aesthetic reasons - and allows for greater control of heating and ventilation, and accentuates the three curved corners of the building. To accentuate the form further, the exterior aluminium structure holding the glass panels in place has been anodised in a bronze-coloured finish, so it will shimmer in the sun. The façade was originally to be powder-coated but the client decided to spend an additional £120,000 on a bronze anodised finish. This excess was justified as being cheaper over 50 years than using a powder-coated finish which would require maintenance. The building's form has been compared with The Ark and City Hall in London.

=== Sustainability ===
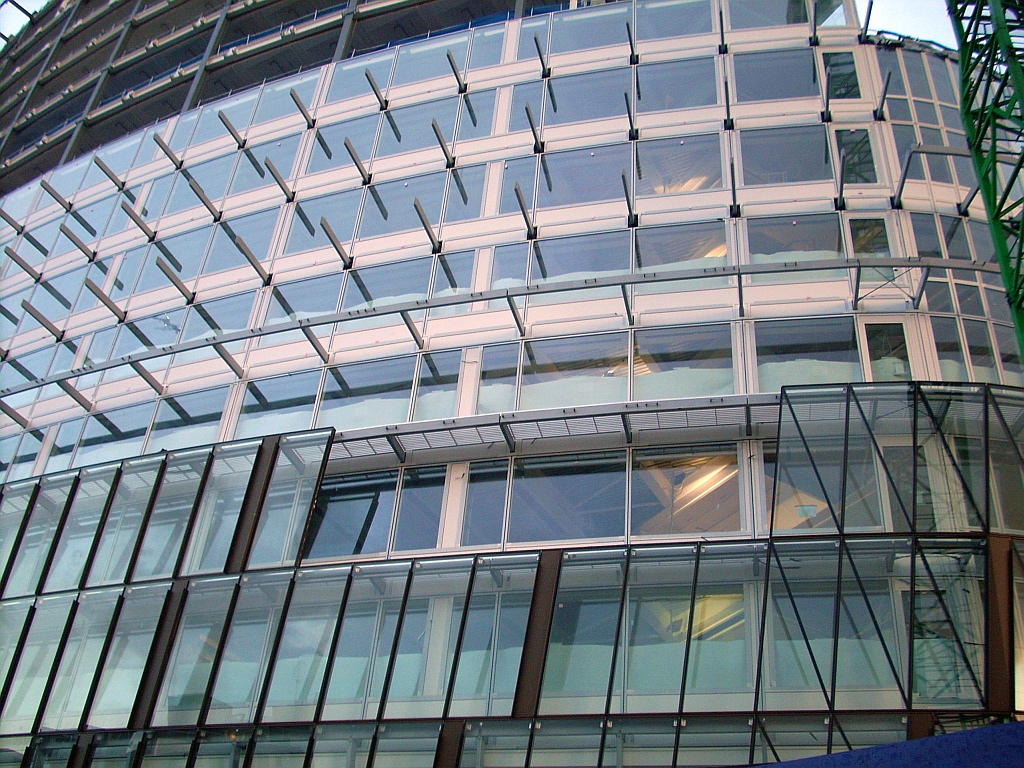
Detail, during construction, 7 December 2011, of the double skin façade that increases natural ventilation. There is a walkway between the inner and exterior façade panels for maintenance and solar shading.

The building is among the largest in Europe to have a BREEAM outstanding distinction as a result of its high, sustainable energy credentials. In December 2011, the building achieved the highest recorded BREEAM score, making it one of the most sustainable large buildings in the world.

The open atrium faces south to collect heat from the sun, an example of passive solar building design. The diagonal slice is angled to the south to allow sunlight to pass into the upper floors and atrium. The sun emits electromagnetic radiation in the form of ultraviolet, but changes to infrared when it passes through glass. This creates heat inside the building and overheating will be countered by five stepped curved shades above the atrium which prevent sunlight overheating the building and stops glare. In winter, louvres atop the double-skin façade are closed to maintain the warm air generated in the building. In summer, the opposite occurs and louvres atop the double-skin façade open and consequently expel hot, rising air from the building to reduce overheating.

The building's sustainable cogeneration heat and power plant uses bio-fuel and waste cooking oil. Its computer systems will recycle waste heat. The building has a used water recycling system and rainwater harvesting. Thermal mass materials which have a high density such as concrete are used to control temperature fluctuations.

== Awards ==
One Angel Square is the only commercial building in the United Kingdom to achieve maximum ratings in energy and sustainability performance by the three main rating systems. It has BREEAM 'Outstanding' accreditation and an A-rated Energy Performance Certificate and Display Energy Certificate.

The building has been awarded:

- Considerate Constructors Scheme – 'Gold' award (2011) - Construction was rated 38.5 out of 40 by the Considerate Constructors Scheme, and achieved perfect scores in five of eight categories.
- Builder & Engineer Awards (2011)
  - Sustainable Project of the Year
  - Architect of the Year – 3DReid
- Green Apple Awards (2012)
  - Bronze Award
- Property Week Awards (2012)
  - Sustainable Achievement Award
- World Architecture Festival (2012) – shortlist
  - 'Future Project – Office' category
- BREEAM Awards (2013)
  - Best Office Building
- MIPIM Awards (2013)
  - Best Office and Business Development – Final four shortlist

== See also ==
- NOMA, Manchester
