= NOMA (Manchester) =

Coordinates: 53.4874°N 2.2369°W

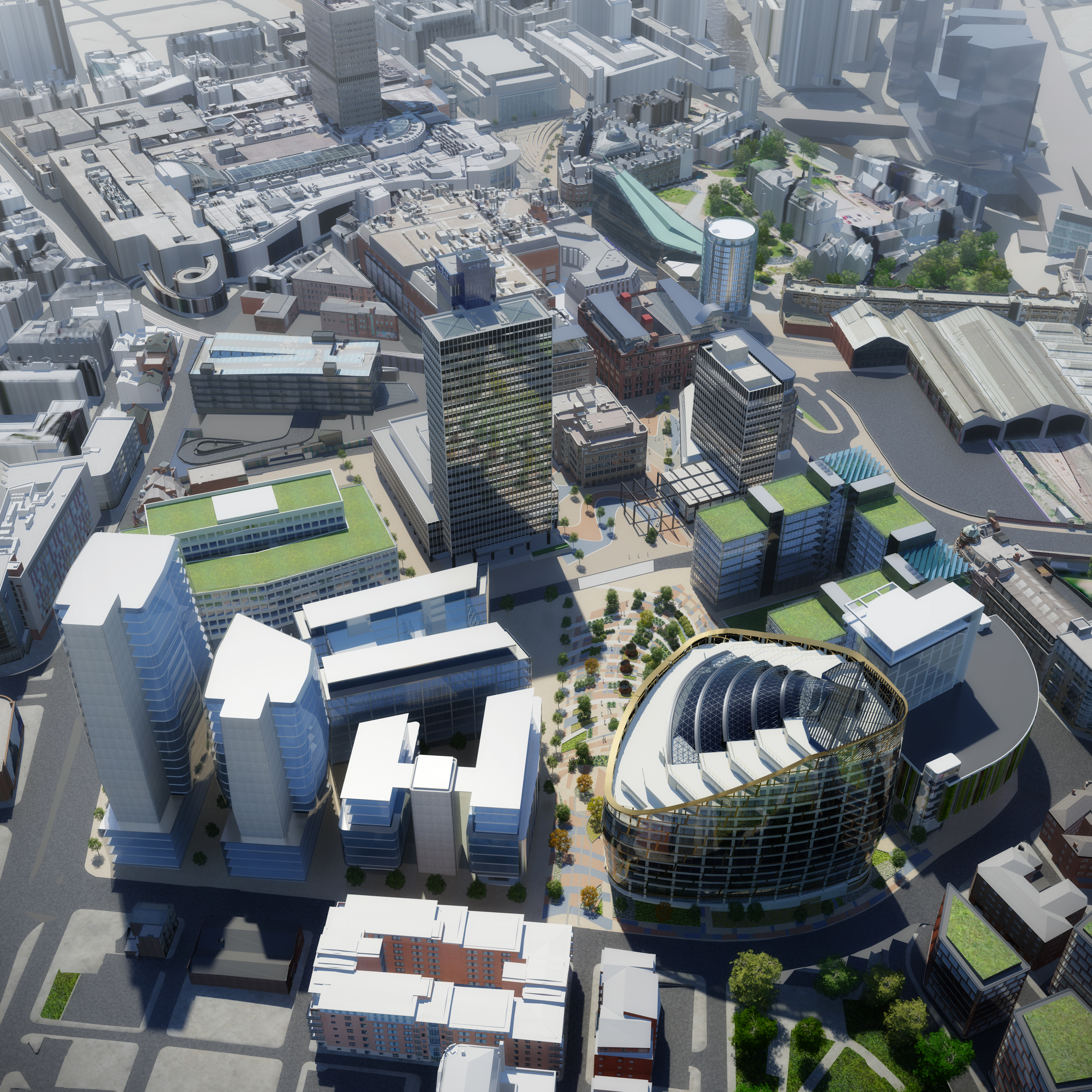
- A render of the NOMA site upon completion.

- Location within Greater Manchester
- OS grid reference: SJ8437898991
  - London: 163 miles (263 km) SE
- Metropolitan borough: City of Manchester
- Metropolitan county: Greater Manchester
- Region: North West
- Country: England
- Sovereign state: United Kingdom
- Post town: MANCHESTER
- Dialling code: 0161
- Police: Greater Manchester
- Fire: Greater Manchester
- Ambulance: North West
- UK Parliament: Manchester Central

NOMA (a portmanteau of North Manchester) is an £800 million, 20-acre (8-hectare) mixed-use redevelopment scheme in Manchester. It is the largest development project in North West England ahead of developments such as MediaCityUK and Atlantic Gateway.

NOMA focuses on revitalising and opening the northern area of Manchester city centre which has not undergone the redevelopment seen in other central areas of the city. The Co-operative Group, the company backing the scheme, have been based in the Manchester area since their inception in 1843 and hope the development will attract more companies to invest in Manchester as they have done and continue to do. The development involves the creation of 4 million square feet (400,000 square metres) of office, residential, retail, leisure and hotel space.

At the heart of the project is the £100 million One Angel Square building, which has been compared to a "sliced egg" due to its distinctive shape and stands at 72 metres (236 feet); it opened in 2013. In April 2014, a joint venture contract was agreed between The Co-operative and Hermes Real Estate to allow the delivery of new phases.

Redevelopment of Hanover Building as a low-cost office space and reconstruction of City Buildings (which is currently in scaffolding) into a hotel are expected to commence in 2015. Future developments include a 106 m (348 ft) residential tower, Angel Gardens, and a further office building, 3 Angel Square.

== Background ==
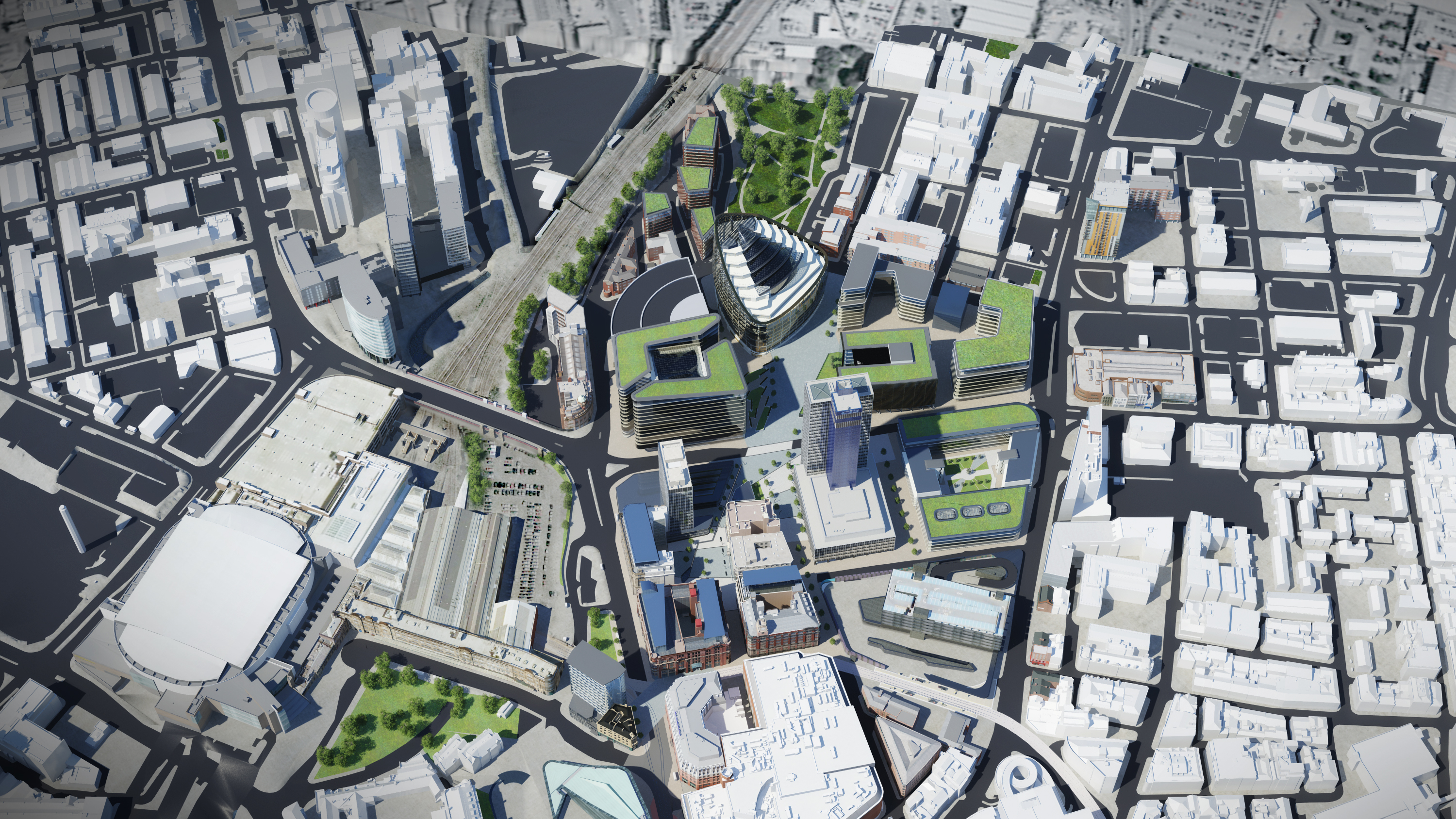
NOMA CGI proposal.

=== Name ===
It was announced in March 2011 that the development would be referred to as NOMA, formed from a convergence of its global geographical location at 53° (used in its logo) North, and its local city location Manchester. Inspiration for the branding was taken from SOMA (South of Market) in San Francisco which has been redeveloped in the last three decades.

=== Location ===
NOMA is situated in Manchester City Centre on a 20 acres (8.1 ha) site. Objections have been raised over the relocation of the inner ring road which passes Angel Meadow.

== Estate ==
=== One Angel Square ===
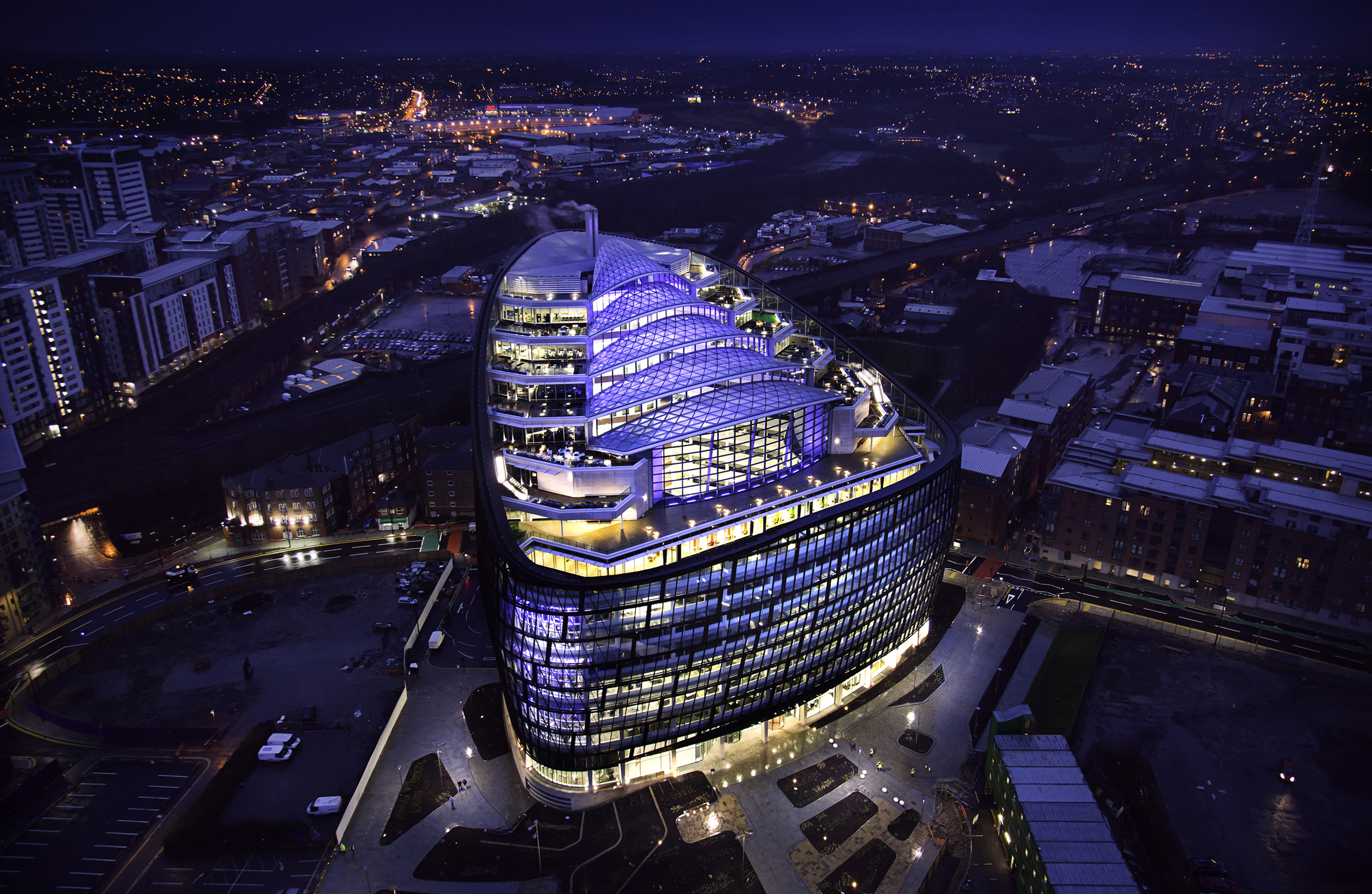
One Angel Square at night. Completed in March 2013.

One Angel Square was the first phase of the NOMA redevelopment scheme and the new support centre for Co-operative Group employees. Construction work began in July 2010, involving 4,000 workers from 90 different companies. One Angel Square is rated 'outstanding' by BREEAM and achieved a score of 92.25. When the building was officially opened by Queen Elizabeth II in November 2013, One Angel Square was 'the most sustainable building in the world'

=== Hanover Building ===
Hanover Building on Corporation Street was built between 1905 and 1909 and is a Grade II listed building. After extensive redevelopment, Hanover opened again in 2018 and has since become Amazon's HQ in the city.

=== New public square ===
Construction began on a new public square and event space in January 2014 and was launched in December 2015. A 1960s building, Redfern Annexe, was demolished to create the new city centre square, which was named Sadler's Yard after pioneer James Sadler. The square has since been used to home a series of public events, including the annual Sadler's Yard Summer Jam, Sit and Stay at Sadler's Yard dog show, and Summer Beer Thing hosted by The Pilcrow.

=== City Buildings and Hotel Indigo ===
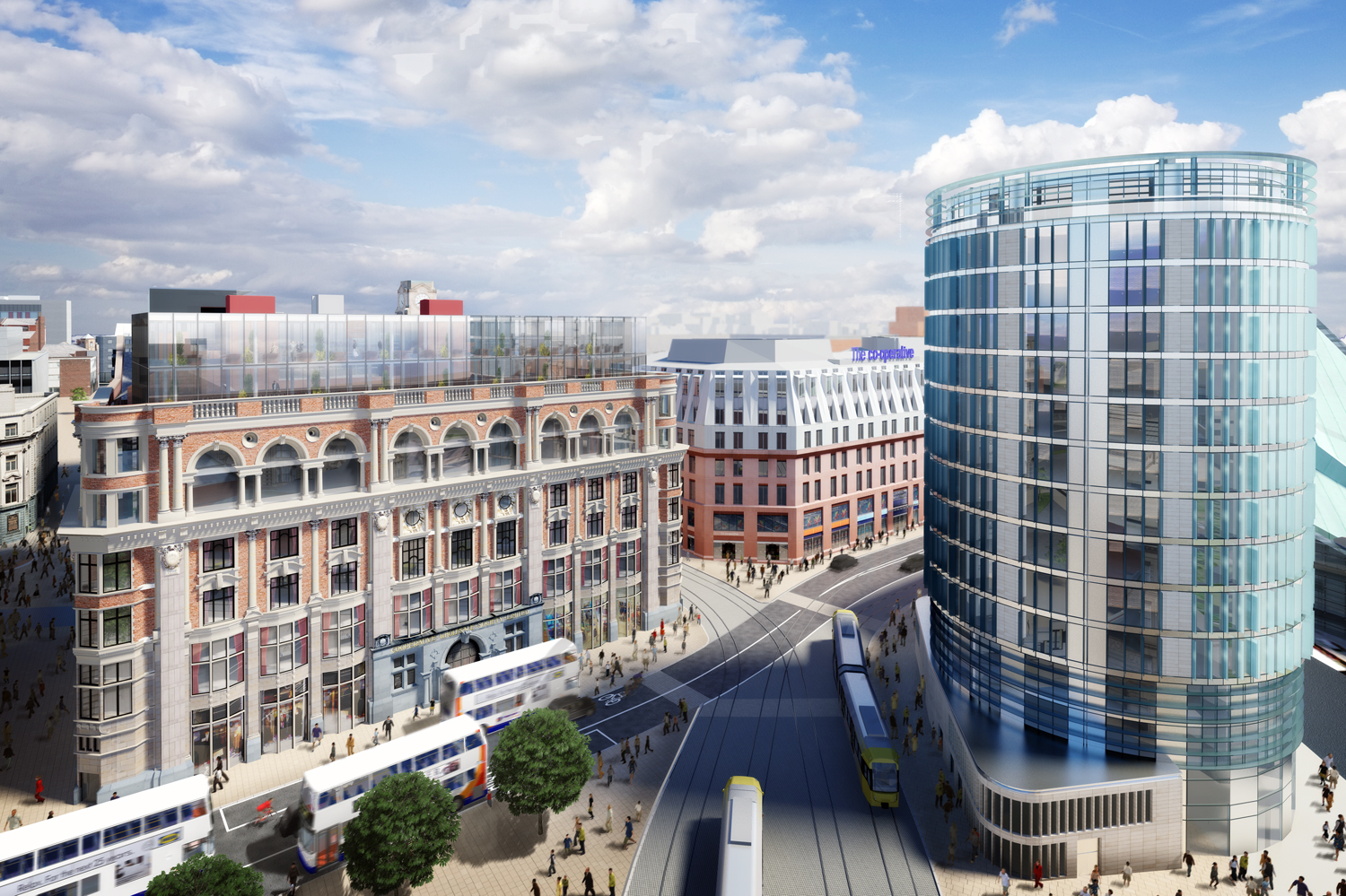
The 14 storey Hotel Indigo building on Corporation Street

The Hotel Indigo was built at a cost of £26 million between the junction of the Victoria tram approach and Todd Street off Corporation Street. It is 14 storeys high and circular in shape. The new hotel incorporates the adjacent Grade II listed City Buildings.

=== New Century House ===
New Century House is a grade II listed building on the corner of Corporation Street and Miller Street. Co-operative Group employees migrated to One Angel Square in 2013 and New Century House will be renovated in 2021. New Century Hall, the grade II listed conference hall attached to New Century House was a music venue that hosted acts such as Jimi Hendrix and Tina Turner in the 1960s and 1970s.

=== Federation House ===
Federation House is the only ex-Co-operative building that is not listed. It was temporarily used by Castlefield Gallery but is now home to "a community of innovators in Manchester".

=== Three Angel Square ===
Announced in March 2014, the concept building will have nine storeys totalling nearly 200,000 square feet (19,000 square metres) of flexible Grade A office space aimed at small to medium companies. It is anticipated that the building will be open by 2018.

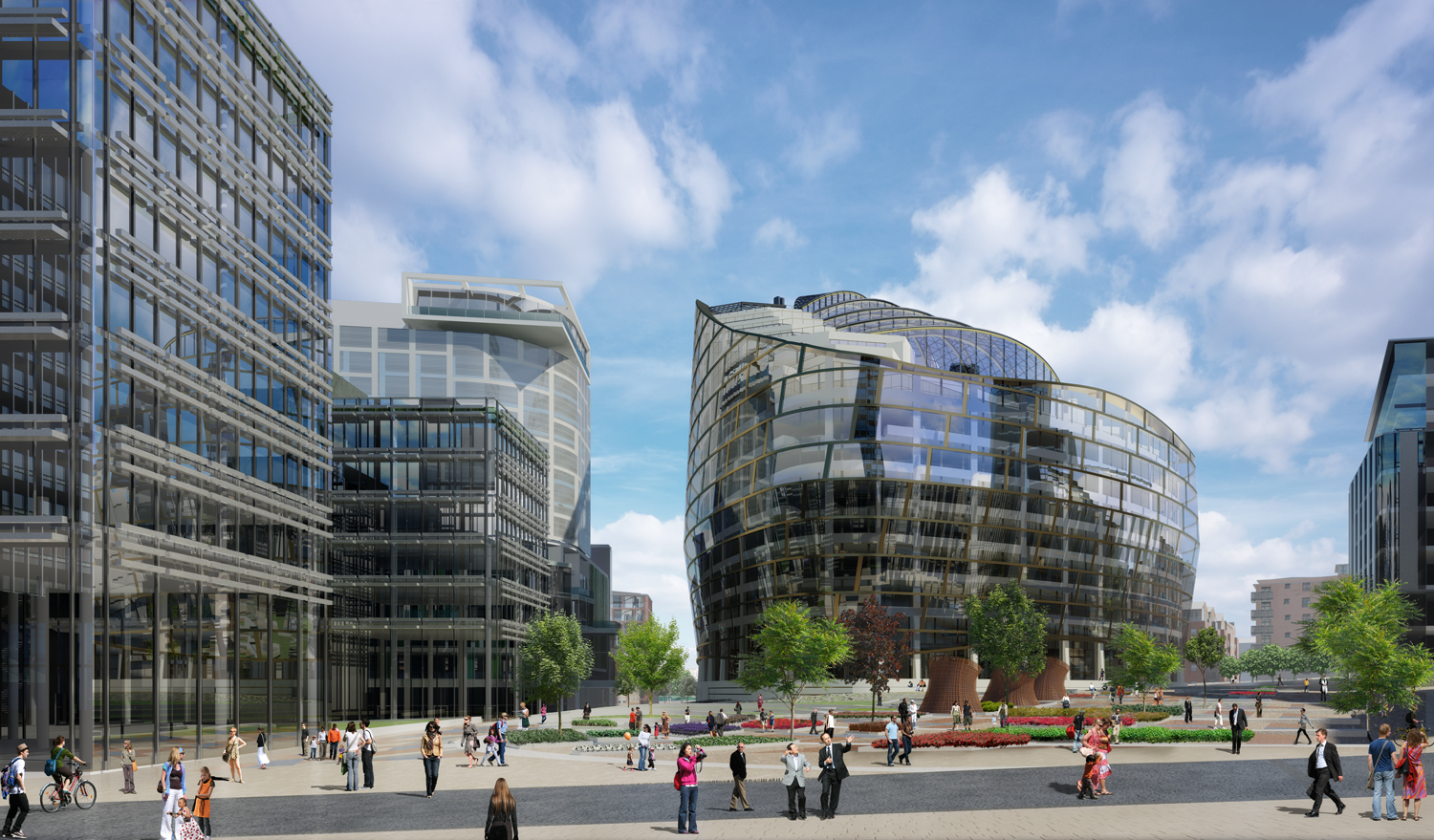

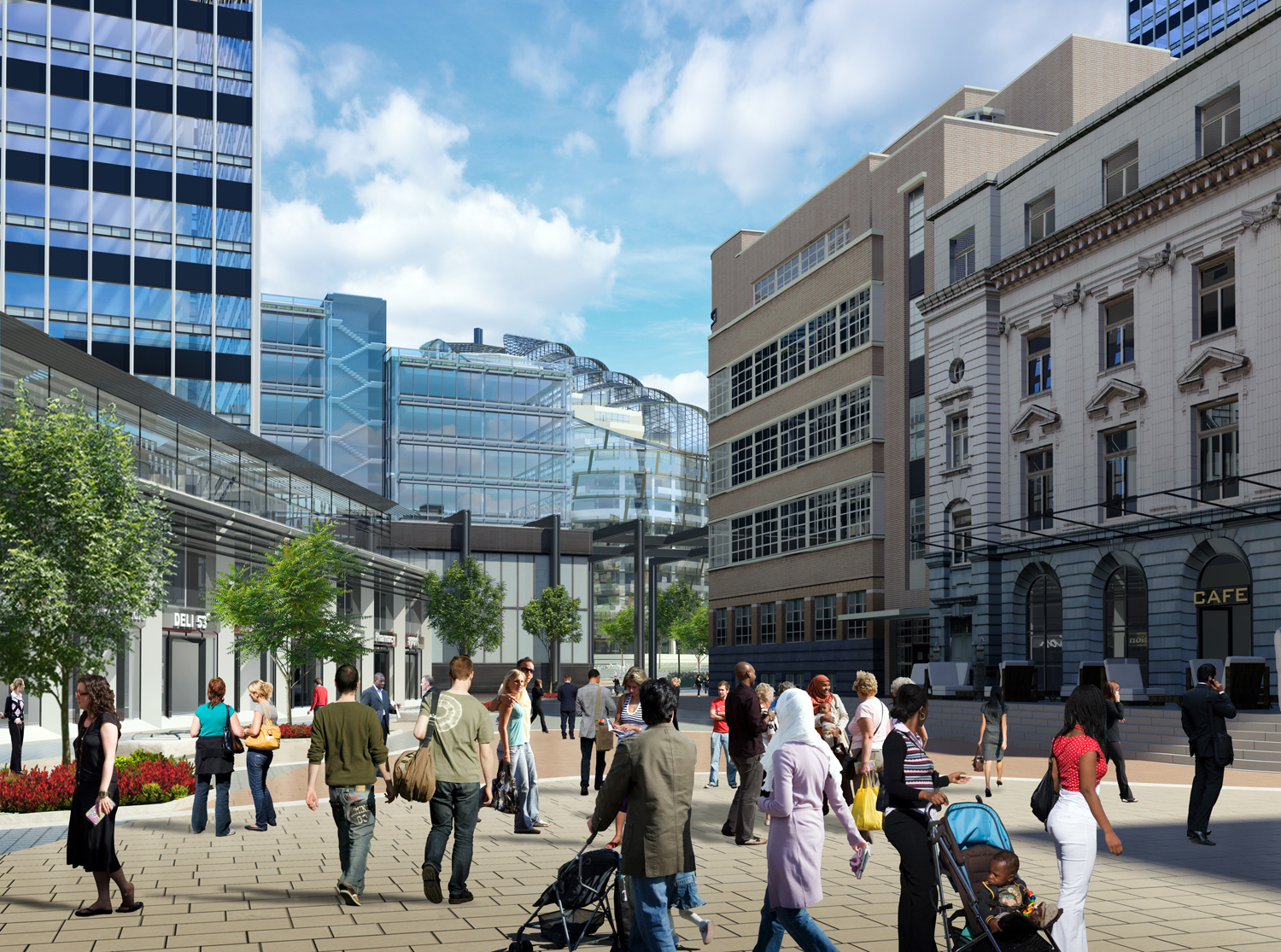

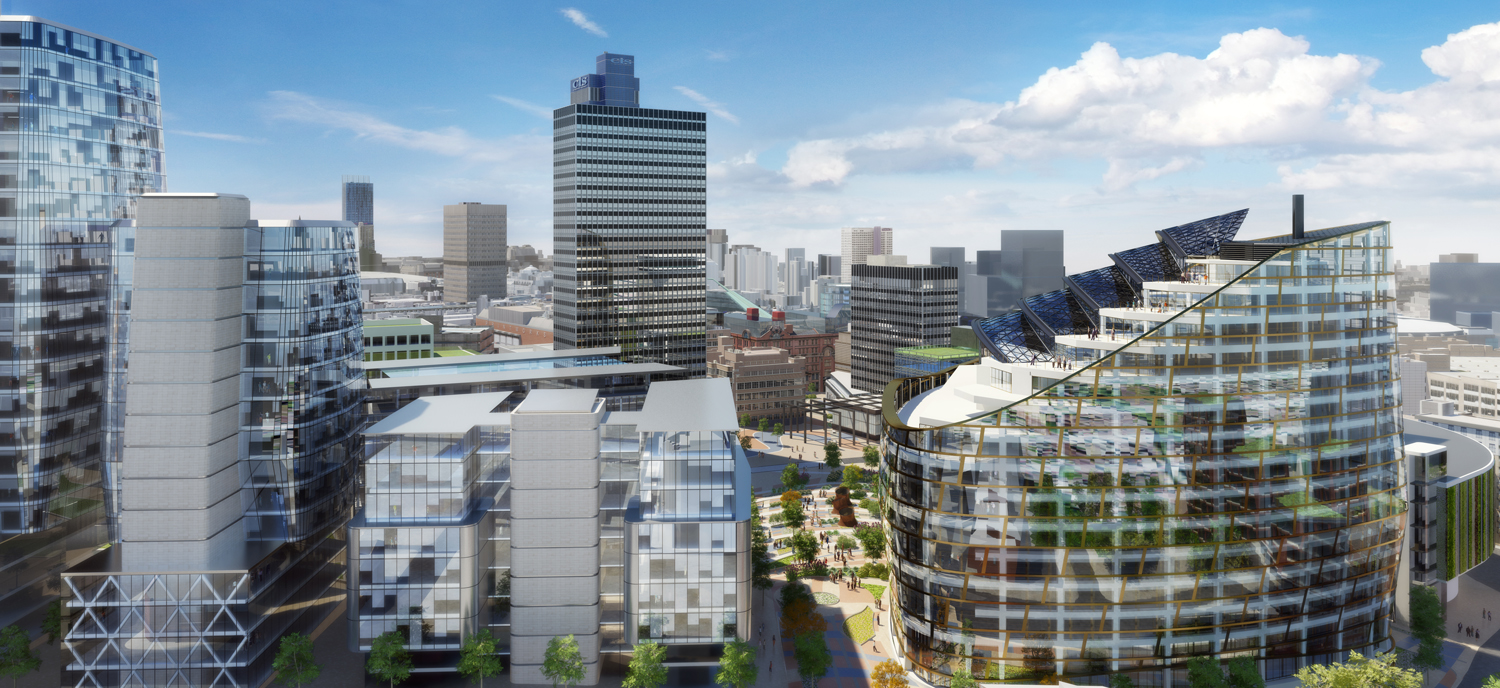

== See also ==
- CIS Tower
- Redfern Building
