= Corporation Street, Manchester =

Street in Manchester, England

Corporation Street
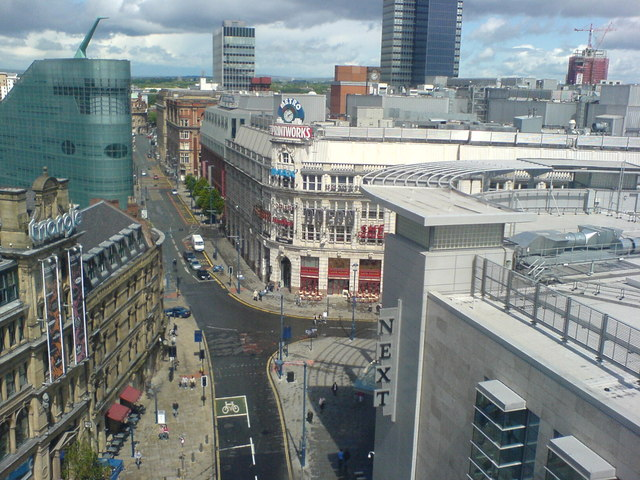
- Corporation Street from the Wheel of Manchester
- Interactive map of Corporation Street
- Length: 0.4 mi (0.64 km)
- Postal code: M4
- Coordinates: 53.4841°N 2.2429°W
- north end: Dantzic Street
- Major junctions: A665
- south end: Market Street

Construction
- Commissioned: 1999; 27 years ago (reconstruction)

Corporation Street is a major thoroughfare in Manchester city centre, England. It runs from Dantzic Street to the junction of Cross Street and Market Street. Major buildings located on or adjacent to the street include the Arndale Centre, Exchange Square, The Printworks, Urbis (National Football Museum) and New Century House next to the CIS Tower.

After the street was bombed in 1996 by the Provisional IRA, the vicinity underwent large scale reconstruction. The area around Corporation Street has been a likely target for several planned terrorist attacks, most recently in 2009. To reduce this threat, the street is partly pedestrianised between Market Street and Withy Grove between 11:00 and 19:00 hours. A series of bollards have been installed that grant access only to emergency service vehicles and buses.

== History ==
=== 19th century ===
Corporation Street was constructed in 1848, cutting through the former mediaeval streets giving access to Ducie Bridge and the north. It ran roughly parallel to Deansgate from Cross Street to its junction with Dantzic Street. The Co-operative Wholesale Society (CWS), founded in 1863 as a logical extension of the 1844 Rochdale Pioneer Society and other local co-ops, established its headquarters in City Buildings, Corporation Street. In 1867, it was joined by the newly formed Co-operative Insurance Company. City Buildings was also the first home of The Clarion, the radical newspaper founded by Robert Blatchford which was first published on 12 December 1891, and which moved to Fleet Street in 1895.

=== Early 20th century ===
In the early 20th century, the scale of the architecture changed as the east side of Corporation Street attracted substantial broad based buildings. The Neo-Baroque building designed by F. E. L. Harris for the CWS was erected between 1905 and 1909, and dated 1907. It was constructed in red brick with polished granite and sandstone dressings. The façade has full height pilasters and Corinthian columns, and the roof is concealed by parapet walls. The Mitchell Memorial Hall was lost in the Manchester Blitz, and the 1907 building was extended to fill the whole block. A further Classical sandstone building on Corporation Street to the north of Hanover Street is owned by the CWS. This was designed by W. A. Johnson in 1928 and opened in 1930. It is symmetrical in design, with further full height pilasters and a large central entrance arch, topped with a mansard roof with dormer windows. By 1908, a new Chief Office for Co-operative Insurance had been built at 109 Corporation Street, which served as their head office until 1962 when they moved to the CIS Tower on Miller Street, barely 100 yards (91 m) distant. Footage captured in 1901 shows the junction of Cross Street and Corporation Street with horse-drawn carriages. The junction with Withy Grove became the northern offices of the national newspaper, the Daily Telegraph.

=== 1996 bombing ===
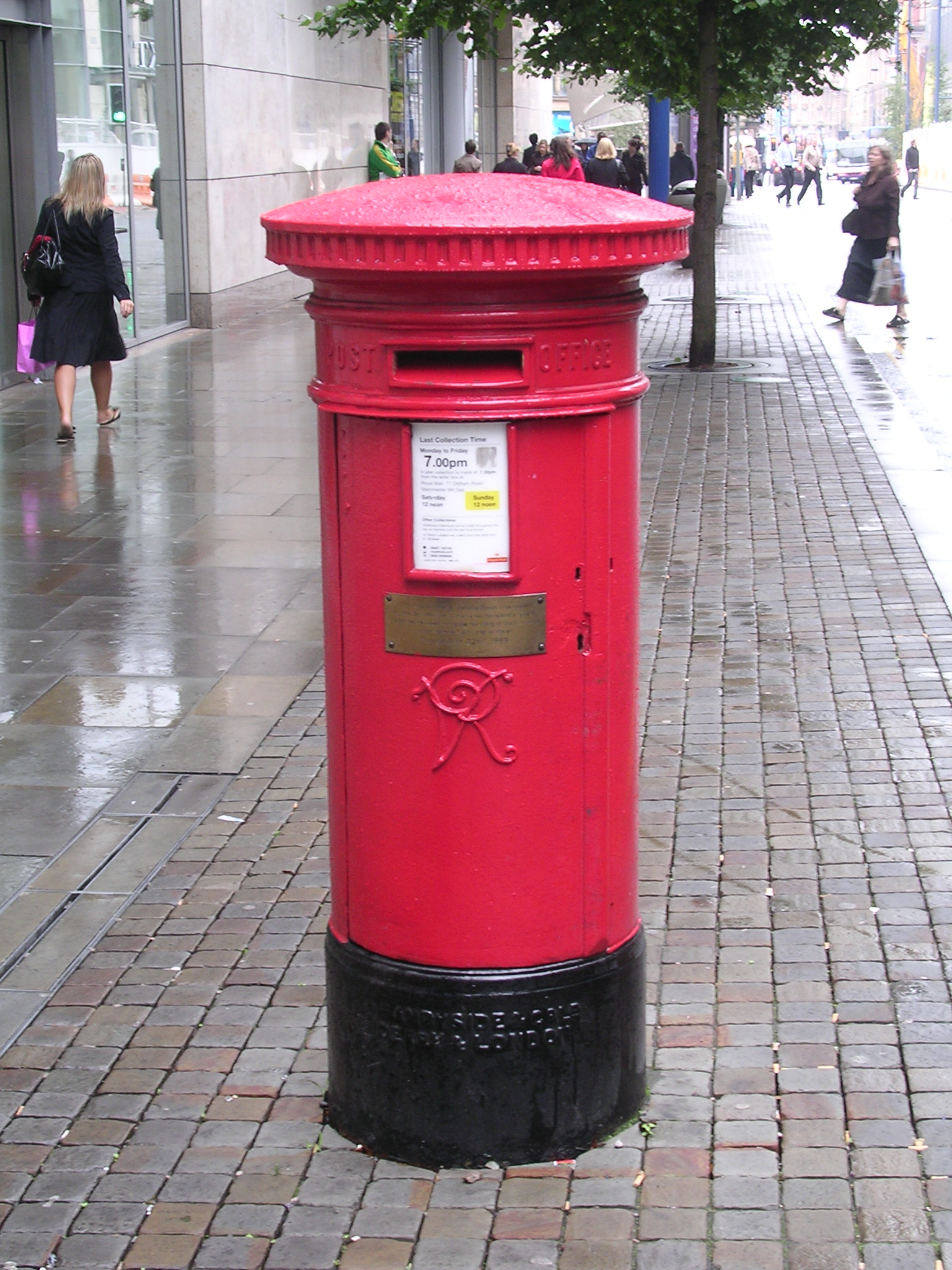
A pillar box, near the top of Corporation Street, the only structure in the area that survived the 1996 bomb. The bombing is commemorated with a brass plaque.

The centre's profile, and the presence of several national chains, made it a target for terrorists. Arson attacks in April 1991 were followed by several firebombs in December 1991 which caused extensive damage to four stores. The Provisional Irish Republican Army (IRA) was blamed for both incidents, in which the devices were placed in soft furnishings during shopping hours. After the second, Christmas shopping continued much as normal the following day in the unaffected stores. One unnamed fireman said, "What bugs me is if there's a big one planted there's a lot of glass around here, and a lot of people will be killed".

On the morning of 15 June 1996, at about 09:20, two men parked a van containing a 1,500 kg (3,300 lb) bomb on Corporation Street between Marks & Spencer and the Arndale. At about 09:45, a coded warning was received by Granada Television, the ITV contractor based in the city. About 80,000 people were cleared from the area by local police and store staff using procedures developed after another IRA bombing incident in 1992. The bomb exploded at 11:17, shortly after the army bomb squad arrived from Liverpool and began making it safe. No fatalities resulted from the bomb, but over 200 people were injured, some seriously, mostly by flying glass and shrapnel; one pregnant shopper was thrown in the air by the blast.

=== Demolition and reconstruction ===
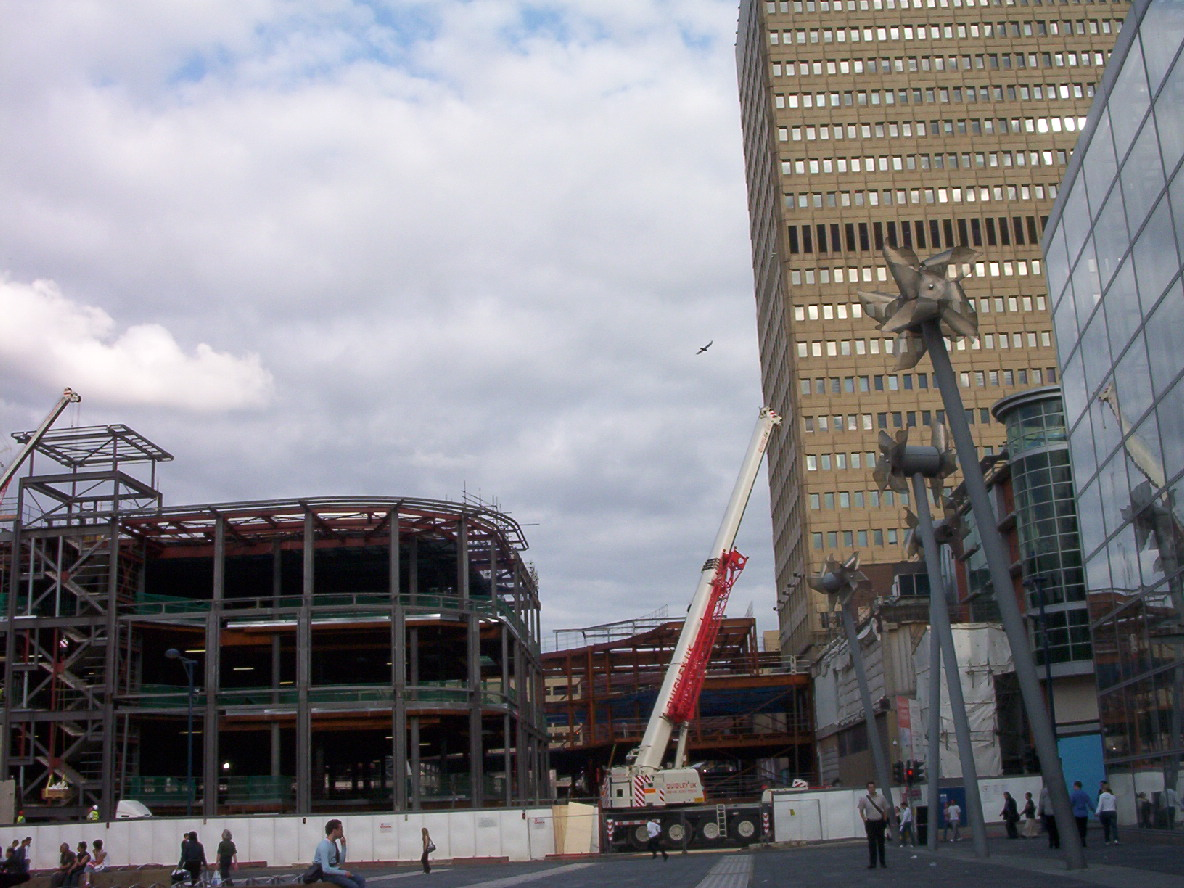
Construction of the Manchester Arndale North development in 2004. The main entrance is located here.

The bomb blast damaged much of the surroundings beyond repair, and on financial grounds the decision was taken to reconstruct Manchester city centre from the ground up. Marks and Spencer and the adjacent Longridge House were condemned as unsafe within days, and were later demolished. The frontage of the Arndale on Corporation Street and the footbridge were structurally damaged. The reinsurance company Swiss Re estimated that the final insurance payout was over £400M, making it, at the time, the most expensive man-made disaster ever.

About 12 buildings in the immediate vicinity of the explosion on Corporation Street were severely damaged. Overall, 530,000 square feet (49,000 m^{2}) of retail space and 610,000 square feet (57,000 m^{2}) of office space were put out of use. Insurers paid out £411 million (£1 billion at 2023 prices) in damages for what was at the time one of the most expensive man-made disasters ever, and there was considerable under-insurance. Victims of the bombing received a total of £1,145,971 in compensation from the Criminal Injuries Compensation Authority; one individual received £146,524, the largest amount awarded as a result of this incident.

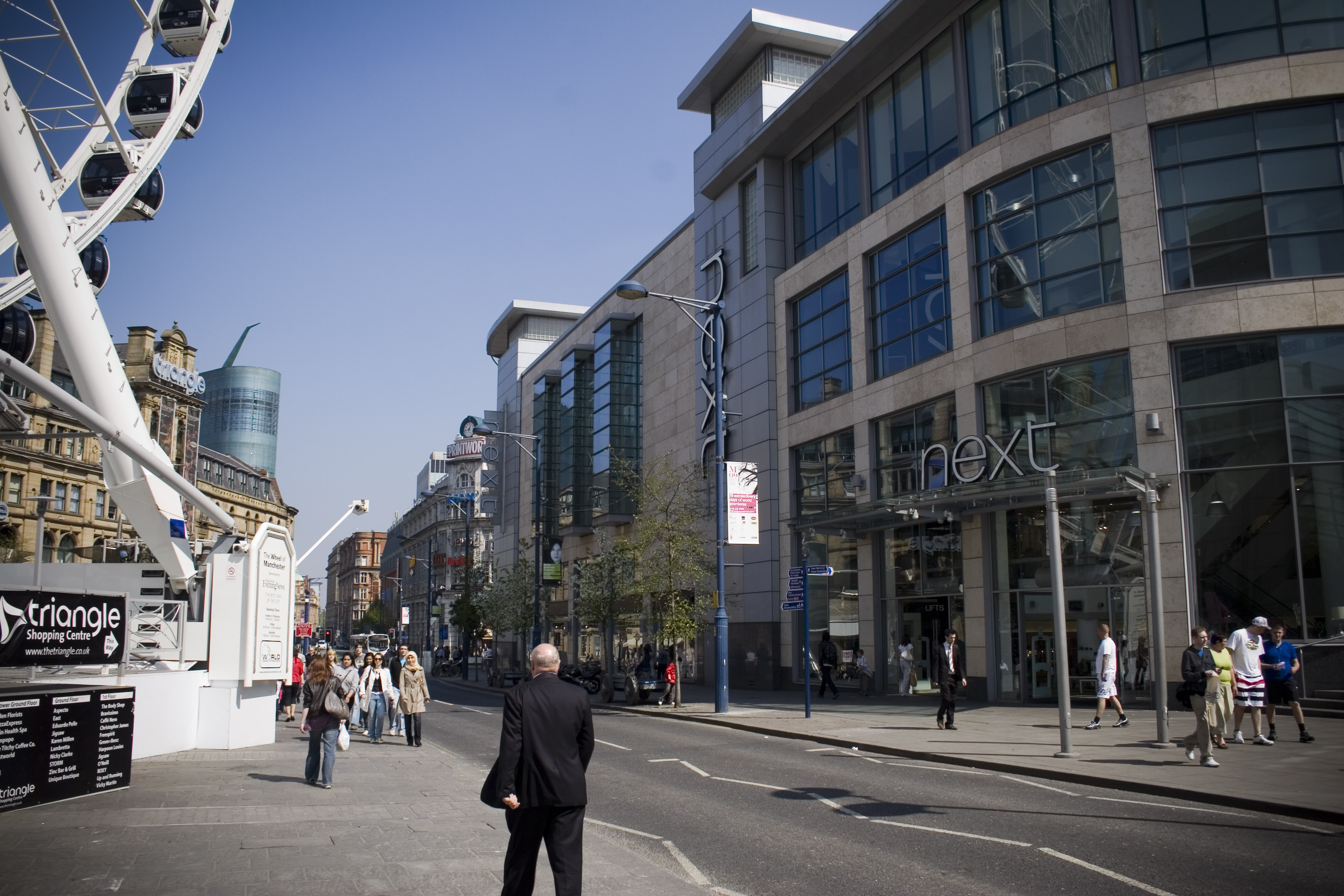
The epicentre of the blast in 2009

According to Home Office statistics, an estimated 400 businesses within half a mile (0.8 km) of the blast were affected, 40% of which did not recover. The heaviest damage was sustained by the three buildings closest to the bomb: Michael House, comprising the Marks and Spencer store and a six-storey office block; Longridge House, offices for Royal and Sun Alliance, an insurance company; and the Arndale Centre, a shopping mall. Michael House was deemed beyond economic repair and demolished. Marks and Spencer took the opportunity to acquire and demolish the adjacent Longridge House, using the enlarged site for the world's largest branch. Marks and Spencer's fortunes changed during construction, and Selfridges subsequently co-occupied the building. Marks and Spencer became tenants of part of the Lewis's store in the interval. The frontage of the Arndale was badly damaged and was remodelled of that part of the city centre.

The glass domes of the Corn Exchange and the Royal Exchange were blown in. The landlord of the Corn Exchange invoked a force majeure condition in the lease to evict all tenants, and the building was converted into a shopping centre. The dome of the Royal Exchange, home to the theatre, was found to have shifted in the blast; its repair and refurbishment took two and a half years.

The possibility of taking the opportunity to rebuild parts of the city centre was raised within days of the bomb. On 26 June 1996, Michael Heseltine, the then Deputy Prime Minister, announced an international competition for designs of the redevelopment of the bomb-affected area. Bids were received from 27 entrants, five of whom were invited to submit designs in a second round. It was announced on 5 November 1996 that the winning design was one by a consortium headed by EDAW.

Whether the bomb acted as a catalyst for development has polarised opinion. The then Chief Executive of Manchester City Council, Sir Howard Bernstein argued that regeneration of Manchester was already under way, as evidenced in the Manchester's newfound ambition to bid for the Olympics in 1992 and 1996. The NYNEX Arena (now Manchester Arena and Europe's largest arena at the time) opened in 1995 and has since proved itself a successful venue.

== Buildings and landmarks ==
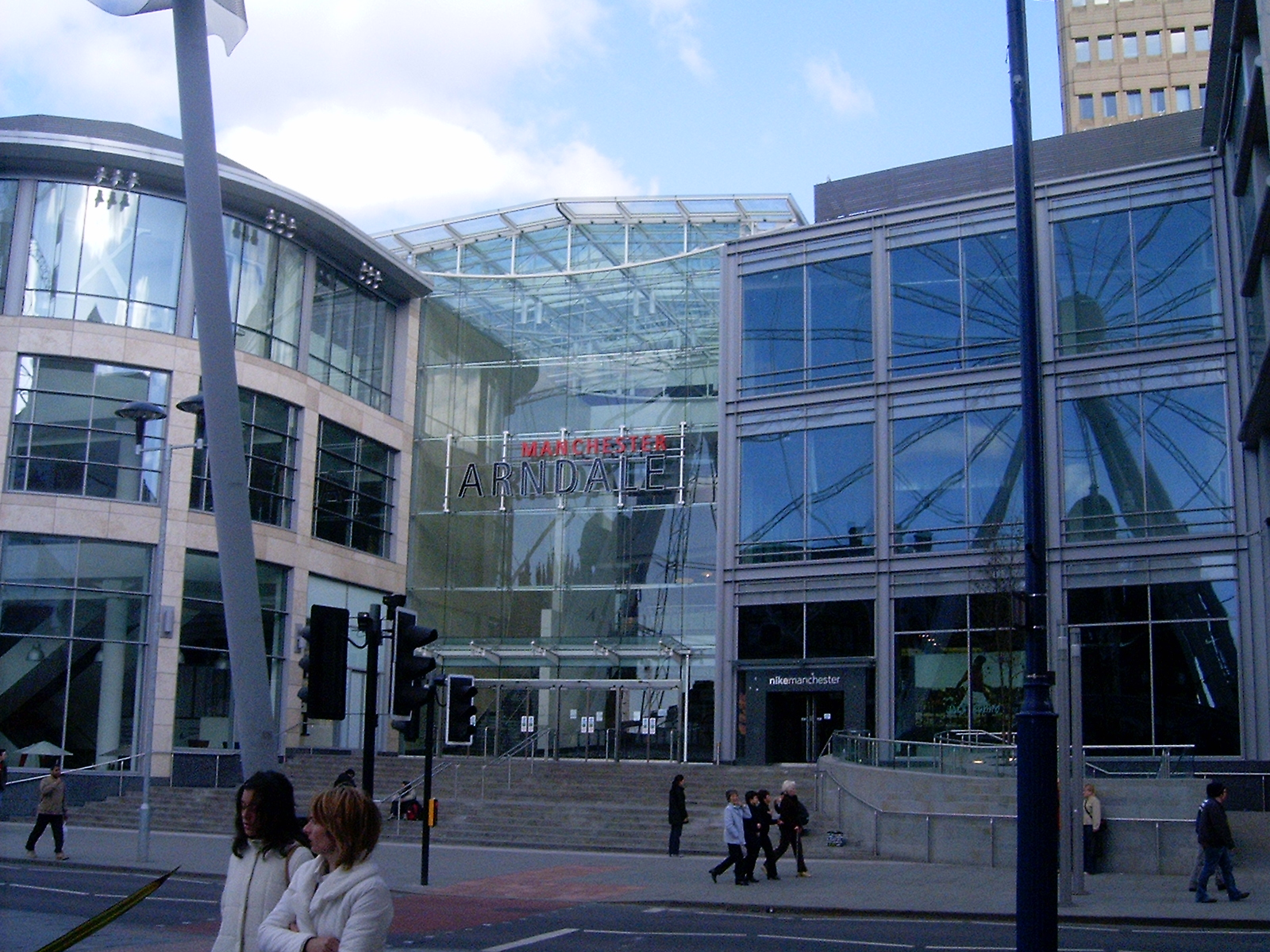
The main entrance of the Manchester Arndale on Corporation Street

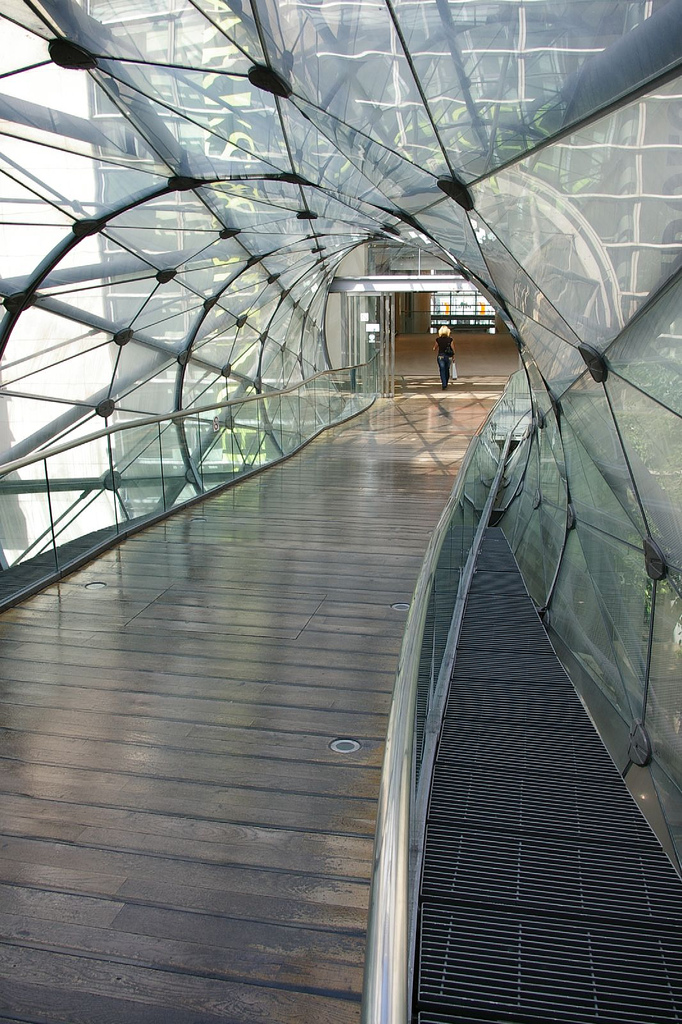
Interior of the Corporation Street bridge linking the Manchester Arndale

=== Manchester Arndale ===
The main entrance to the Manchester Arndale is located on Corporation Street. A bridge crossing Corporation Street connects the Manchester Arndale to Selfridges.

=== Wheel of Manchester ===
Located adjacent to Corporation Street in Exchange Square was the Wheel of Manchester, a transportable Ferris wheel installation which provided views over Manchester city centre and beyond. The first wheel was installed in 2004, the second in May 2007.

In 2010, Manchester City Council proposed a 120 m (394 ft) wheel, to be operated by World Tourist Attractions, as a replacement for the existing transportable installation, with Piccadilly Gardens the possible site and completion expected by Christmas 2011.

In 2012, the most recent installation was dismantled ahead of events taking place for the London 2012 Olympic Games.

=== Urbis ===
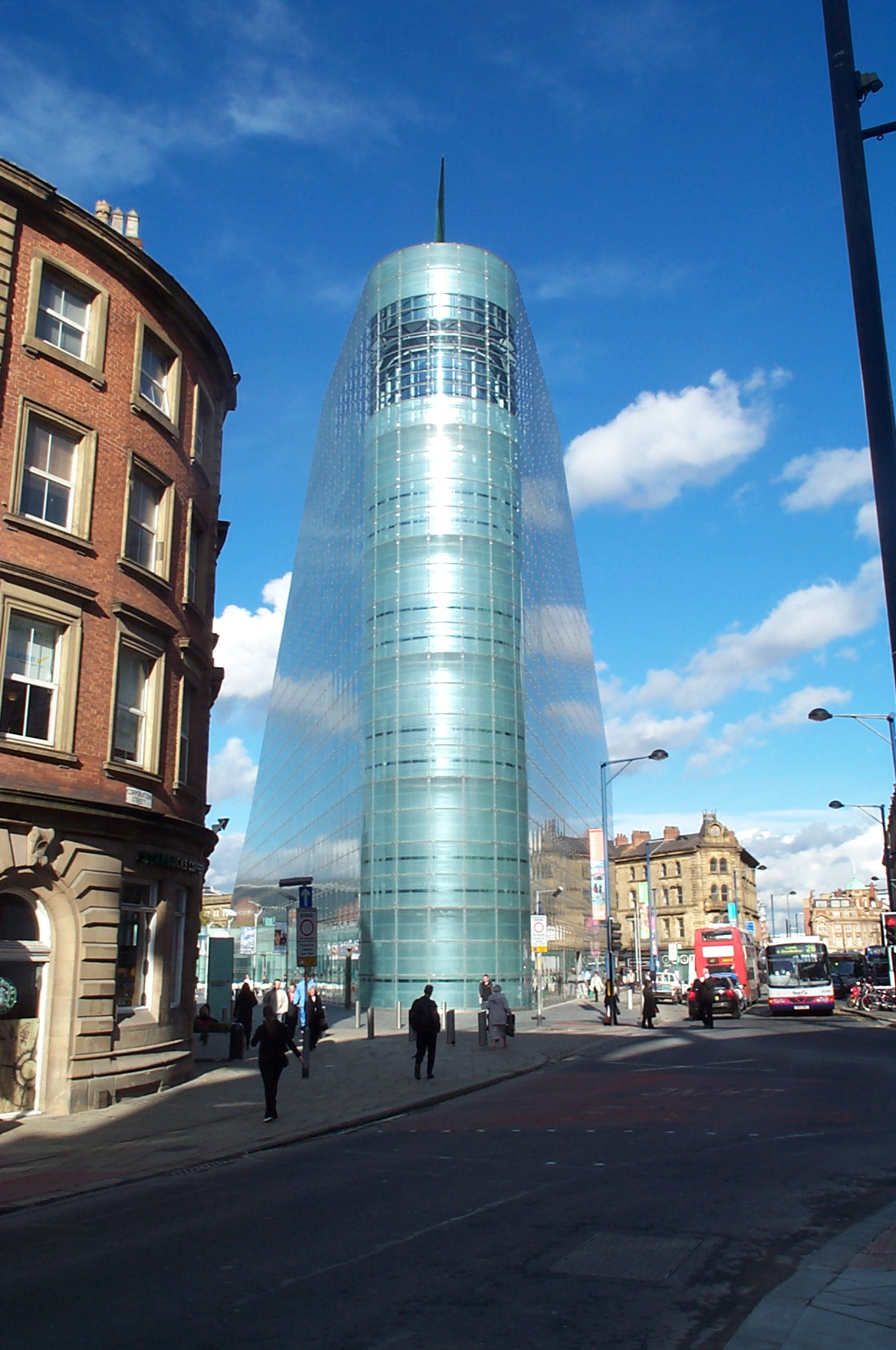
Urbis, situated alongside Corporation Street as seen in the image

Urbis, located adjacent to Corporation Street was opened in 2002 and hosted exhibits on popular culture such as music and art including Mancunian culture.

Urbis temporarily closed in February 2010 to transform it for the National Football Museum which moved from Preston. The museum opened on 6 July 2012.

== Pedestrianised zone ==
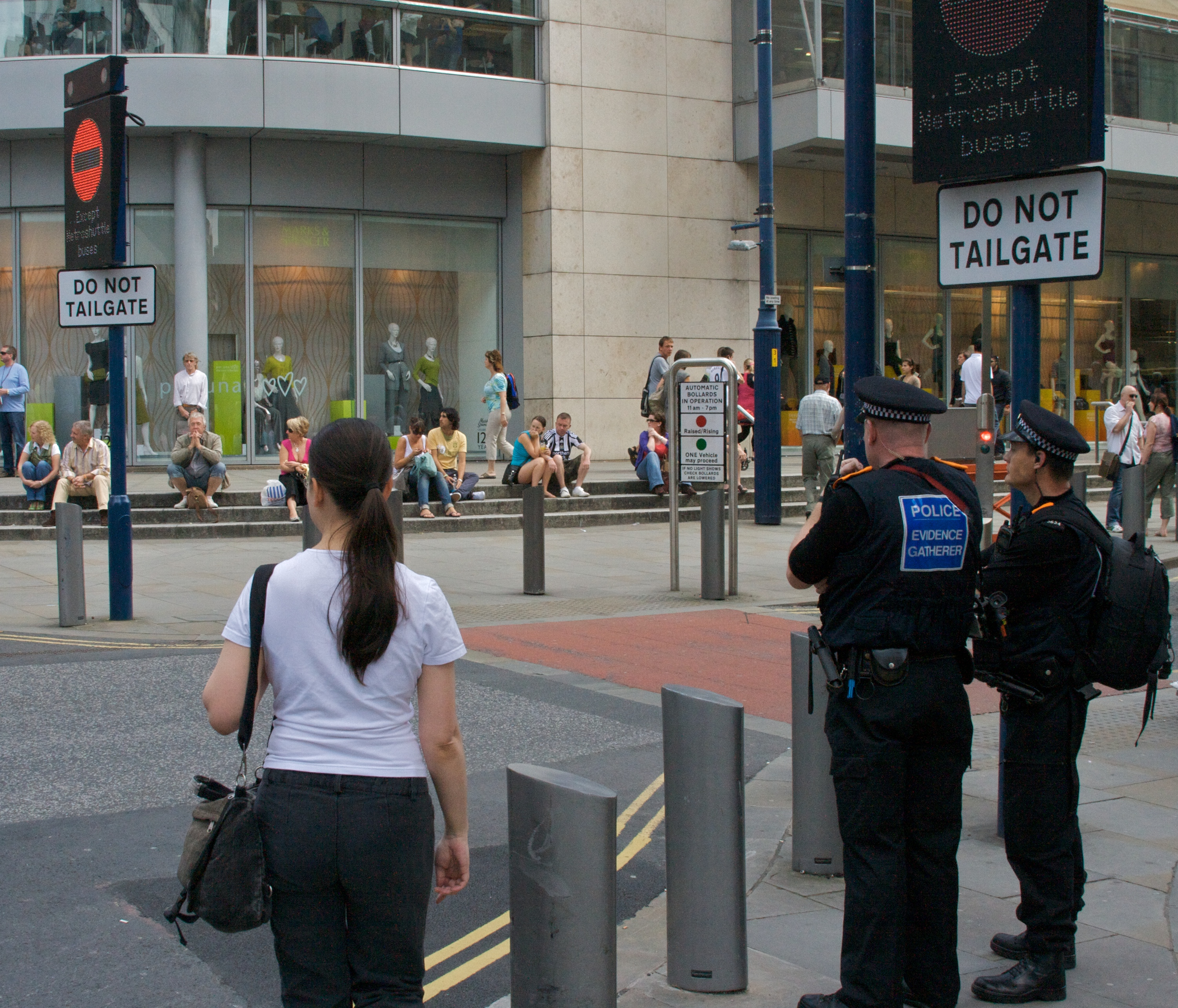
Only buses and emergency vehicles are granted access between 11:00 and 19:00 hours.

After the 1996 bombing it was decided to limit traffic allowed onto Corporation between Withy Grove and Cross Street. The IRA had reverted to using vehicle bombs, as evidenced in the Manchester bombing and other attacks such as the 1988 Armagh bomb, and so crowded areas on major streets represented a risk to pedestrians. Vehicular access to the area is limited by rising bollards. A credit-card sized key is attached to the windscreen of authenticated emergency vehicles and buses, which is automatically scanned. The bollard lowers, accompanied by a sound to warn pedestrians, and allows the vehicle to pass.

The bollards surrounding Corporation Street have gained a bad reputation in the media with CCTV footage showing cars colliding with them. They are known for being unreliable: a special fire engine became lodged on a rising pair of bollards in 2008. In March 2009, a Metroshuttle bus collided with the retractable bollards and three people had to be taken to hospital with minor injuries, and in April 2009, footage was captured showing an ambulance doing a U-turn to find an alternative route after the retractable bollards failed to lower.

== Bibliography ==
- Atkins, Philip (1976). Guide across Manchester. Manchester: The Civic Trust for the North West. ISBN 0-901347-29-9.
- Hartwell, Clare (2001). Manchester. Pevsner Architectural Guides. London: Penguin. ISBN 0-14-071131-7.
- King, Ray (2006), Detonation: Rebirth of a City, Clear Publications, ISBN 0-9552621-0-0
- Parkinson-Bailey, John (2000), Manchester. An architectural history, Manchester and New York: Manchester University Press, p. 364, ISBN 0-7190-5606-3
- Williams, Gwyndaf (2003). The Enterprising City Centre: Manchester's Development Challenge. Routledge. ISBN 978-0-415-25262-1.
