= Co-operative College =

Coordinates: 53°29′12″N 2°14′22″W

- Type: Charity
- Industry: Education
- Founded: 1919
- Defunct: 31-07-2026
- Headquarters: Manchester, United Kingdom
- Area served: international
- Key people: Jacqui Thomasen CEO, Ali Longden Principal
- Revenue: 5,492,423 pound sterling (2016)
- Number of employees: 12
- Website: co-op.ac.uk

The Co-operative College was a UK educational charity dedicated to the promotion of co-operative values, ideas and principles within co-operatives, communities and society.

== Origins and development ==
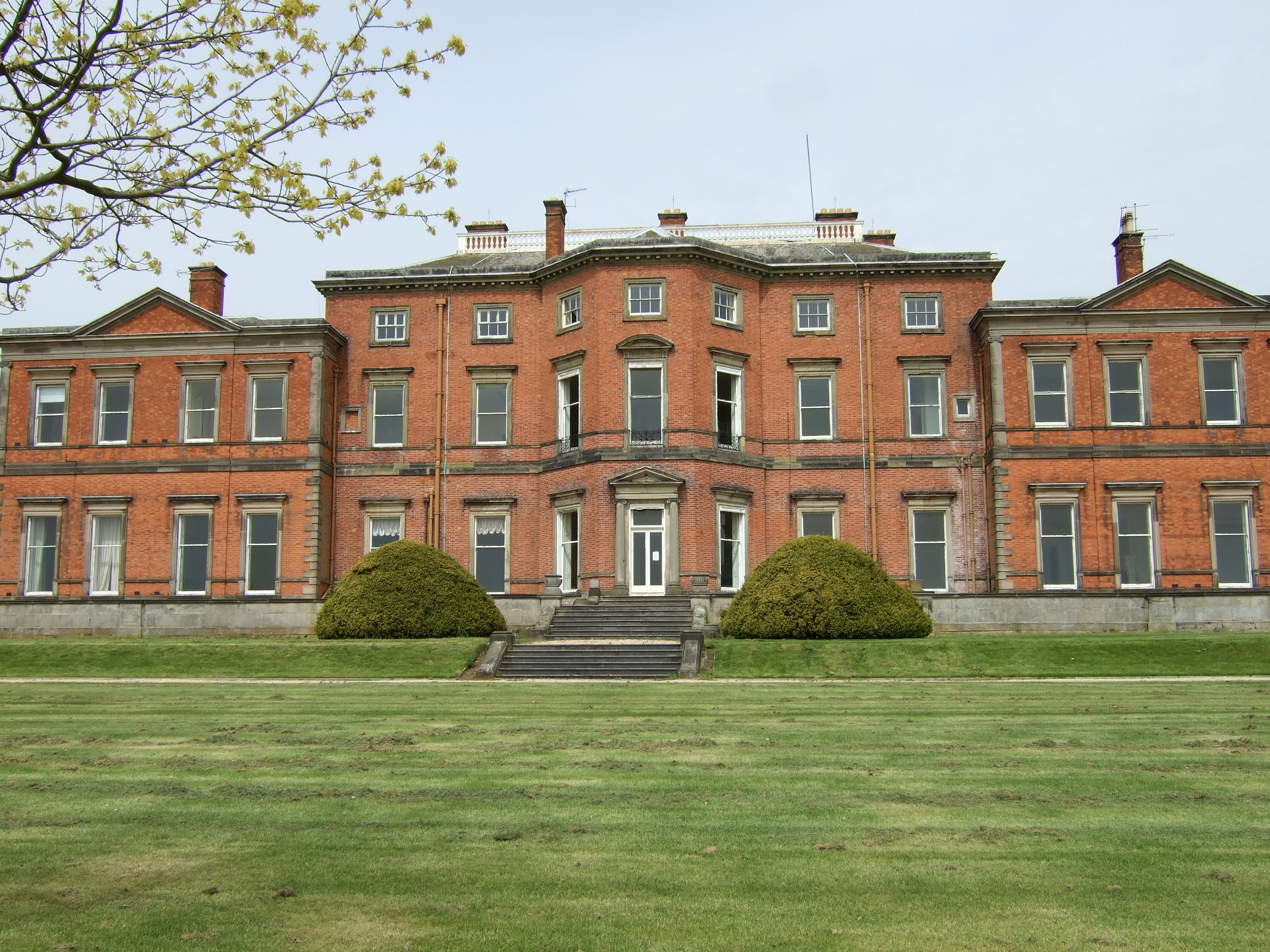
Stanford Hall, Nottinghamshire where the college was based from 1944 to 2001

The Co-operative College was established in 1919 by the Co-operative Union with ten overseas students based on the second floor of Holyoake House, Manchester, and in 1943 the College became a charitable trust.

In 1940, Holyoake House was damaged in the Manchester Blitz, and in 1946 the Co-operative College relocated to Stanford Hall, near Loughborough, where it spent almost fifty years. Along the years that the College spent in Stanford, it ran residential courses in social/economic subjects for adult learners and a wide range of retail and management courses for co-operative employees.

The College then operated as a remote working organisation, but retained an office in its original home at Holyoake House.

== Closure ==
On 31 July 2026, the College closed because of a lack of funds. Some of its teaching remained available through the Open University.

== Key areas of work ==
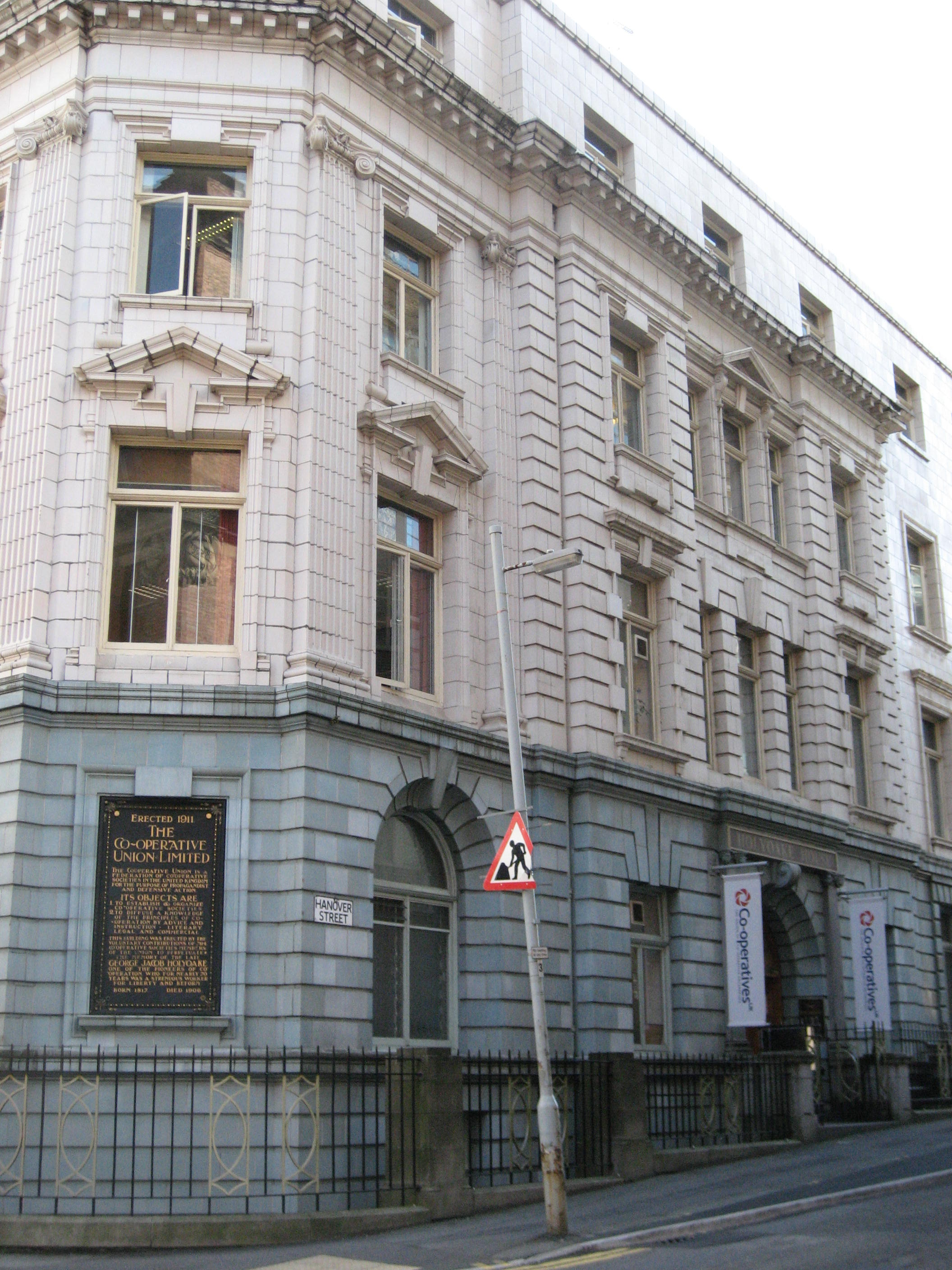
Holyoake House, Hanover Street, Manchester, where the College is currently based

- Co-operative learning and development
- International co-operative development
- Co-operative study tours to Greater Manchester
- Youth empowerment

== See also ==
- Co-operative studies
