= James Sadler (balloonist) =

First Englishman to ascend in a hot-air balloon

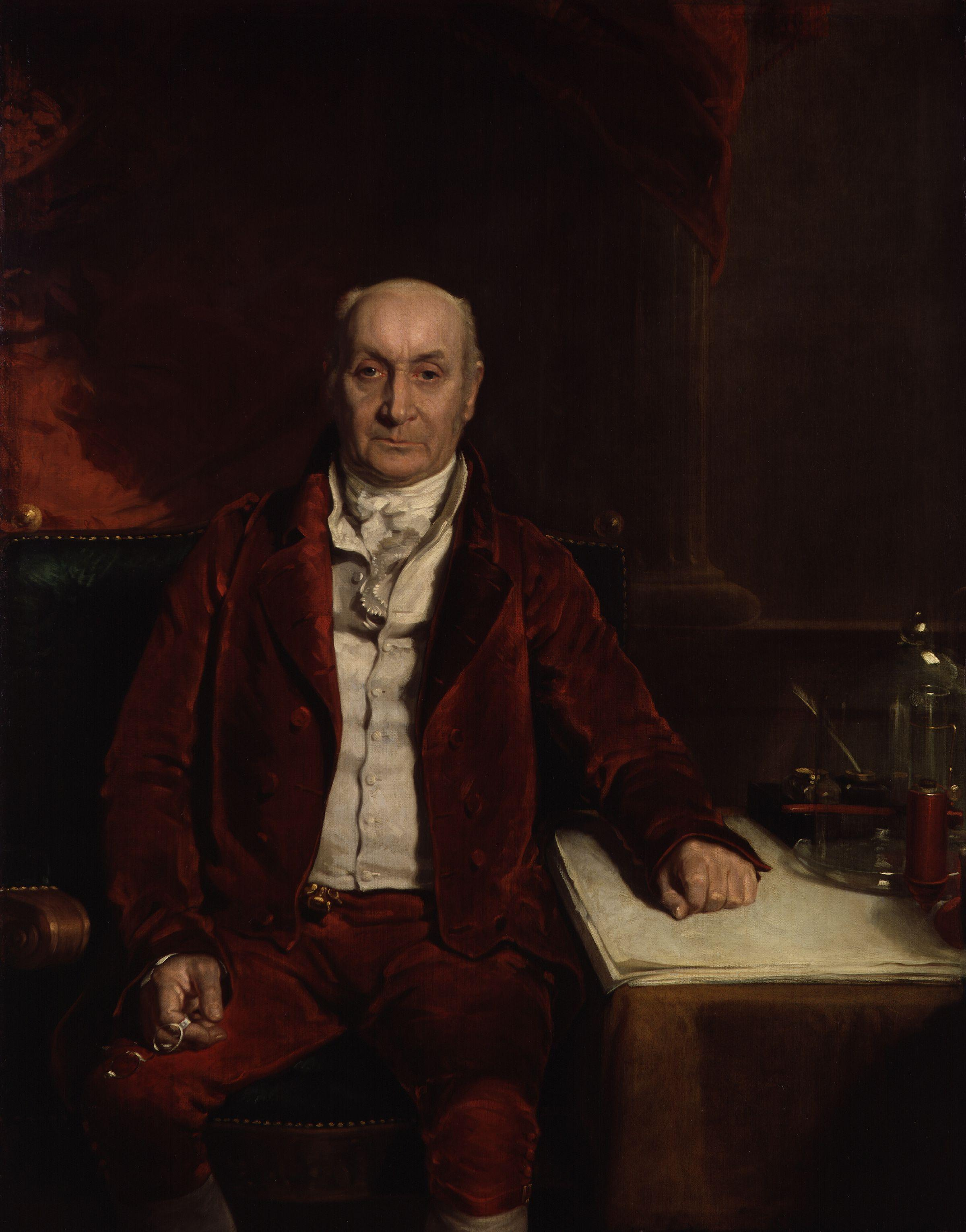
James Sadler

James Sadler (February 1753 – 28 March 1828) was the first English balloonist, as well as a chemist and pastry chef.

== Life ==
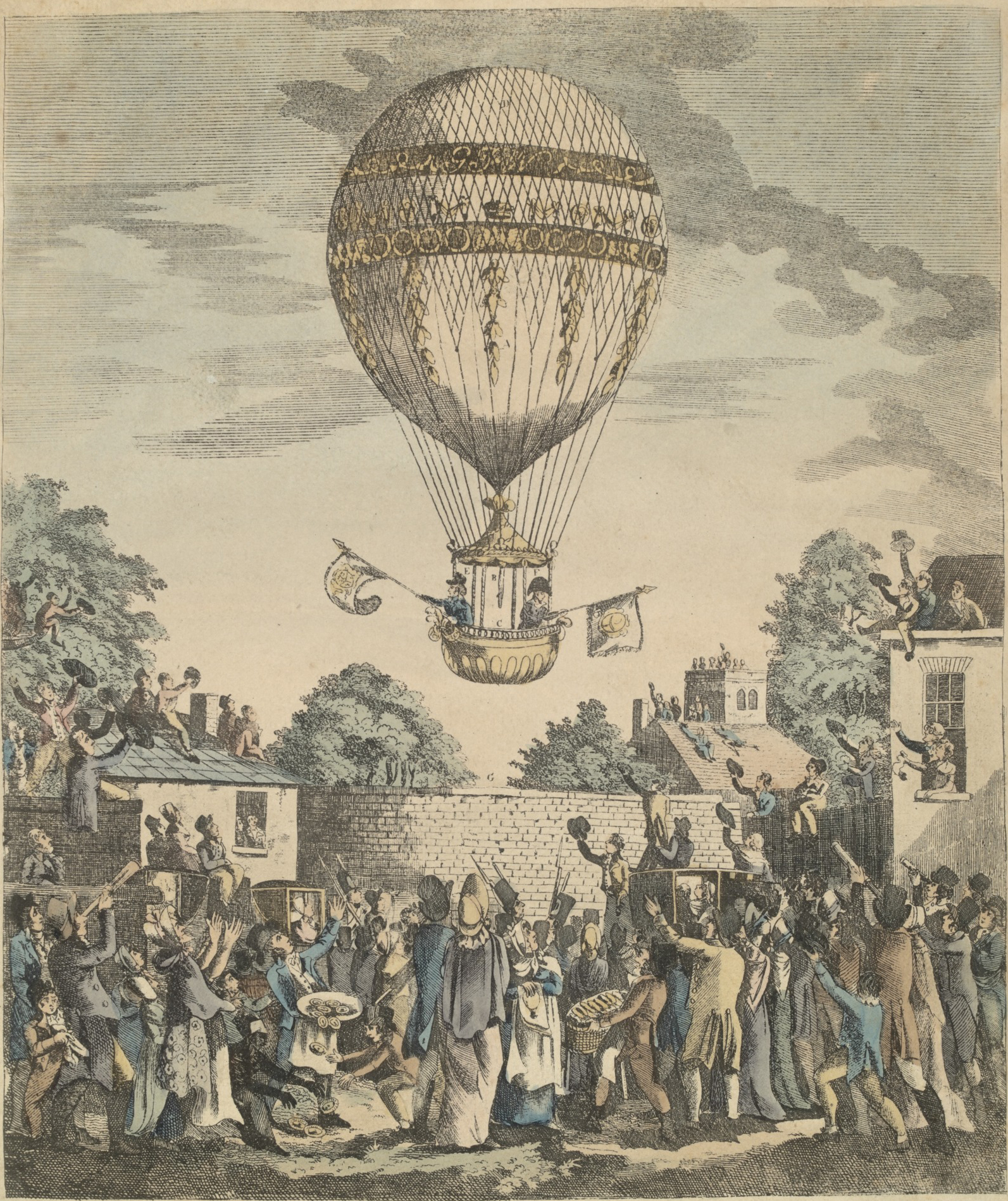
A view of the balloon of Mr. Sadler's ascending. Print illustrating Sadler's ascent on 12 August 1811.

Sadler worked as a pastry chef in the family business, The Lemon Hall Refreshment House, a small shop in Oxford.

Sadler was the second person to make a balloon ascent in England, very soon after the Tuscan Vincent Lunardi's flight on 15 September 1784 in the grounds of the Honourable Artillery Company at Moorfields. James Sadler was still the first English Aeronaut, making his ascent the following month, on 4 October 1784 from Christ Church Meadow, Oxford. The balloon, filled with hot air from a wood burner, rose to about 3,600 feet (1,100 m) and landed near Woodeaton, around six miles (10 km) away.

Sadler's second ascent occurred on 12 November, this time in a hydrogen-filled balloon. It reached Aylesbury in Buckinghamshire after a twenty-minute flight.

In May of the following year he took off near Moulsey Hurst, Surrey, accompanied by W. Wyndham MP, hoping to reach France, but in fact descending in the Thames Estuary, and thus failing to repeat the earlier exploit of Jean-Pierre Blanchard and his passenger. Sadler made two further ascents in May 1785, the first of which was from a field behind a gentleman's garden on the site of what is now Balloon Street in Manchester. On this flight he was accompanied by a cat and landed in Radcliffe. On his second ascent he travelled alone and, having risen to 13,000 feet (4,000 m), travelled 50 miles (80 km) before landing near Pontefract, West Yorkshire. On this occasion, he sustained bad injuries after being dragged for around two miles (3 km) by the balloon, which eventually threw him clear before taking off again empty.

Sadler was appointed Chemist in 1796 in the newly created Naval Works Department under Sir Samuel Bentham. Although the post was only abolished in 1807, he had major disagreements with Bentham and carried out few works. His most important invention was that of the table steam engine. Sadler was responsible for improvements to cannon design, from the barrel to the shot used, to improve accuracy; for which he was praised by Admiral Lord Nelson.

He resumed his ballooning activities although he was devastated by the death of his younger son, Windham William Sadler, in a ballooning accident in 1824. His son John Sadler was affiliated with Thomas Beddoes and the Pneumatic Institution in Bristol.

James Sadler is buried at the church of St Peter-in-the-East in Oxford, now part of the college St Edmund Hall.

== Legacy ==
Although a celebrity in his own time, Sadler is largely unknown today. This has been partly attributed to his lack of writing any works and partly to class prejudice: he was only a pastry chef and not formally educated. Despite being a resident of Oxford and an accomplished scientist, the university mostly ignored him and academics looked down on him. While obituaries for Sadler were written elsewhere on his death, the university's own newspaper wrote simply, "Mr James Sadler, elder brother of Mr Sadler of Rose Hill, Oxford, has died."

A public square in Manchester was named after Sadler on 8 September 2015 by NOMA, which is a neighbourhood being developed in partnership by The Co-operative Group and Hermes Investment Management. The square is named Sadler's Yard and is near to Balloon Street.

== Selected balloon ascents ==
- 7 July 1810: at Oxford, on the occasion of the installation of Lord Grenville as Chancellor at Oxford University.
- September 1810: from Bristol, with the chemist William Clayfield, landing safely near Combe Martin in the Bristol Channel.
- 29 August 1811: from Hackney to East Thorpe in Essex (near Colchester), with Henry Beaufoy (1786–1851); a number of experiments were performed.
- 7 October 1811: a speed record during a gale, travelling over one hundred miles (160 km) in about 1 hour 20 minutes.
- 12 August 1812: ascended from the 'Pilgrim' Estate at Everton, near Liverpool. Travelled in a south-easterly direction and descended safely a short distance from the Derby Chapel.
- 1 October 1812: from Belvedere House near Drumcondra, Ireland, attempting to cross the Irish Sea; he almost drowned in the attempt but was finally picked up by a fishing boat, in the Irish Channel, off Liverpool.
