= Gordon Tait =

British architect

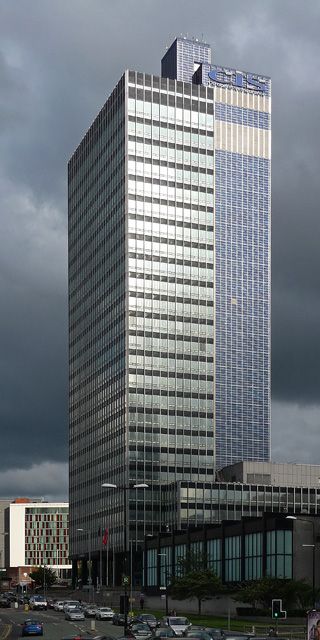
The CIS Tower, Manchester

Gordon Thomas Tait (12 March 1912 – 3 October 1999) was a British architect, active in London.

== Life and work ==
Tait was the eldest son of Scottish architect Thomas Smith Tait and Constance Hardy. He abandoned a career as a sculptor and became an architect. Between 1930 and 1935 he studied at the Architectural Association in London, with his younger brother Kenneth.

=== Architectural career ===
During 1933-34 he acted as clerk of works for his father's partner, Francis Lorne, on the Mount Royal flats in London's Oxford Street. He then found employment with Alliston & Drew and Hugh Minty, rejoining his father's firm of Burnet Tait & Lorne in 1936. In 1938 he worked alongside his father on the Tait Tower and other buildings of the Glasgow Empire Exhibition, and on various housing schemes. He was admitted to the Royal Institute of British Architects (RIBA) on 3 April 1939, being proposed by his father, Hugh Minty, and Joseph Emberton. Although he was made a partner in the practice in that year, he soon joined the Royal Air Force and served in Rhodesia during the Second World War, attaining the rank of Squadron Leader.

After the war, his father's practice experienced financial difficulties, following a sharp decline in business, the death of Ludovic Gordon Farquhar, and the cancellation of a Colonial Office commission. Gordon Tait took up residence in Bedford Square, and took responsibility for the London practice. He was elected a fellow of RIBA in 1948, with Basil Spence as one of his proposers. Francis Lorne took charge of the Edinburgh office, moving to South Africa around 1949. Tait bowed to financial pressure and reluctantly took on new partners in the London practice, which became known as Sir John Burnet, Tait & Partners, then just Burnet Tait. The subsequent economic revival provided an increase in commissions, and the partnership specialised in corporate headquarters buildings, schools and housing. The practice also expanded into the Middle East, with an office in Riyadh, Saudi Arabia where it built the King Faisal Hospital.

=== Personal ===
Tait was active politically as a Conservative Party councillor in Paddington, and as Master of the Worshipful Company of Masons. He married Patricia in 1934 and had two children by her. The elder of these, Gavin, continued the practice. Following the death of Patricia in 1960, Gordon remarried and had three children with Marion Tait. He retired in 1979, leaving London to live in his holiday home in Ladymead, East Harting, West Sussex, a property which he had owned since 1962. He collected vintage cars, rode and sailed.

== Examples of work ==
- Samuda Estate, London
- CIS Tower, Manchester 1959-1962 (with G S Hay)
