= New Century House =

Listed building in Manchester, England

Coordinates: 53.48715°N 2.2398°W

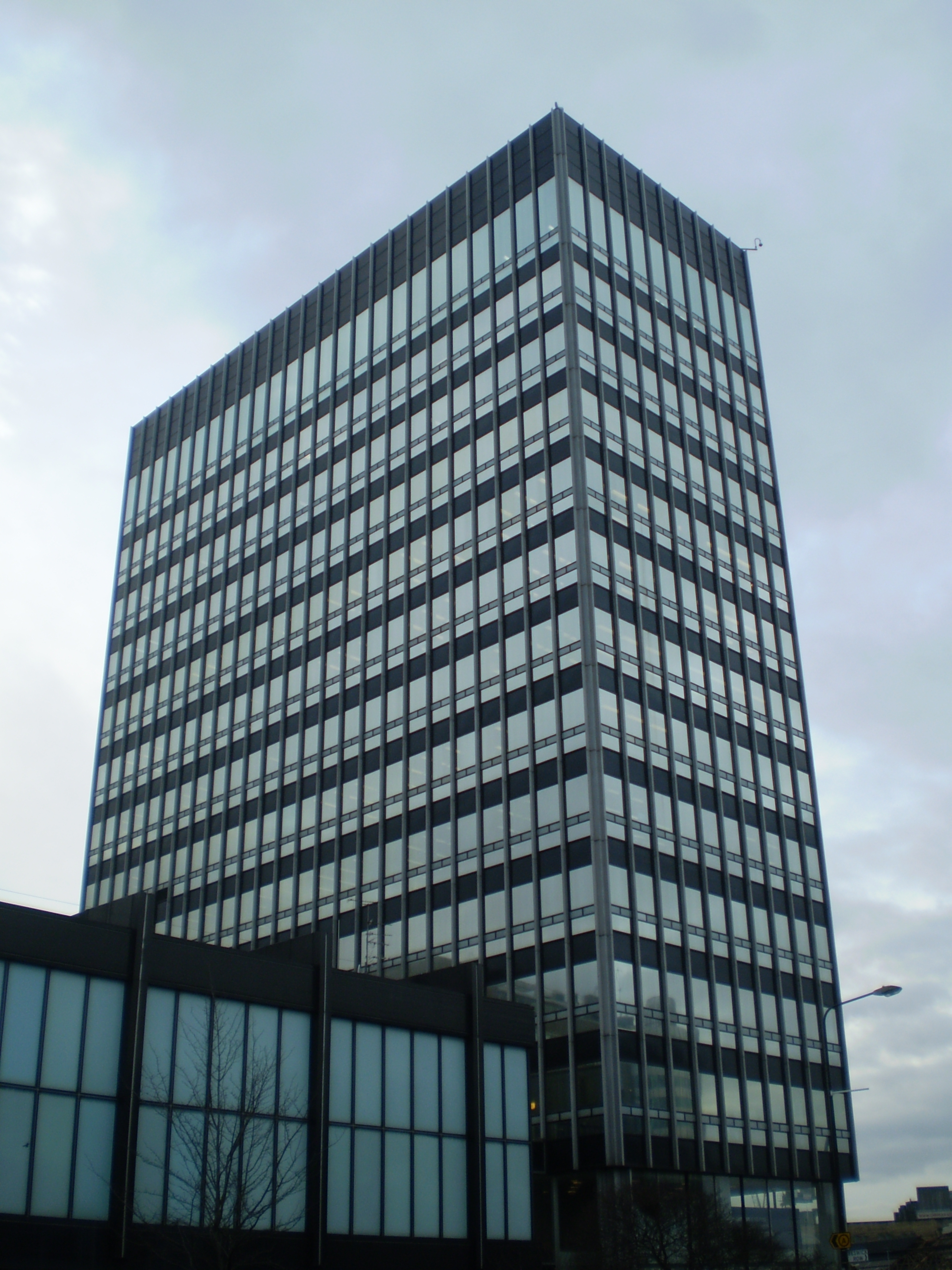
- New Century House, Miller Street

General information
- Status: Completed
- Type: High-rise office
- Architectural style: Modernist architecture
- Location: NOMA, Manchester, Greater Manchester, England, New Century House, Corporation Street, M60 4ES
- Construction started: 1959
- Completed: 1963
- Inaugurated: 11 May 1963
- Owner: NOMA

Height
- Height: 50 m (160 ft)

Technical details
- Floor count: 14

Design and construction
- Architects: Gordon Tait of Sir John Burnet, Tait & Partners; George S. Hay of CWS
- Main contractor: John Laing & Son
- Designations

Listed Building – Grade II
- Official name: New Century House, including its attached conference hall and abstract concrete relief wall in the entrance piazza
- Designated: 24 November 1995
- Reference no.: 1255052

New Century House is a Grade II listed high-rise office building with an attached conference hall, in the NOMA district of Manchester, England. The building is 50 metres (160 ft) tall and has 14 floors. There is office space, conference and catering facilities, and a gym.

== History ==
=== Co-operative Group ===
New Century House was designed by G. S. Hay and Gordon Tait and constructed by John Laing & Son for the Co-operative Insurance Society in 1962. The attached New Century Hall has a capacity of 1,000 people. New Century House and Hall were Grade II listed in 1995 as a good example of a high-quality post-war office building. It is considered one of the finest modernist towers in the United Kingdom alongside its sister building the CIS Tower (1962, Grade II), the Arts Tower in Sheffield (Grade II*) and Euston Tower (1970) in London. It is described in its listing as, "A design of discipline and consistency which forms part of a group with the Co-operative Insurance Society".

=== NOMA ===
In 2013 Co-operative Group employees moved from New Century House to One Angel Square. New Century House is now part of the NOMA redevelopment scheme. Office and kitchen space in New Century House is available to local small to medium-sized businesses. New Century Hall is now available as a venue.

== Sources ==
- Ritchie, Berry (1997). The Good Builder: The John Laing Story. James & James.
