= Hanover Building =

Listed building in Manchester, England

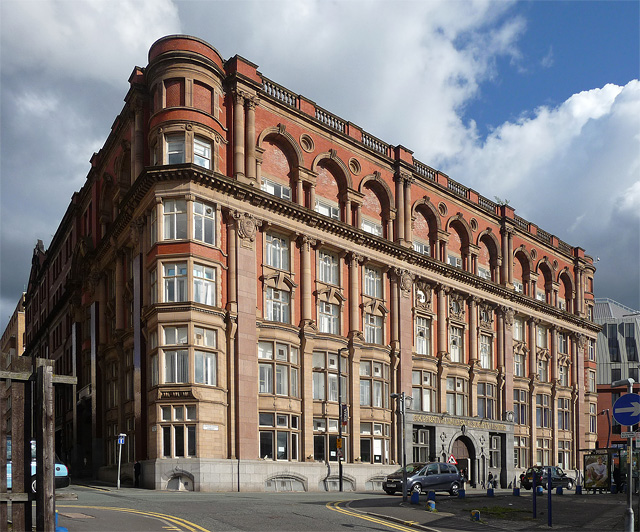
- Hanover Building front façade

General information
- Type: Office
- Architectural style: Edwardian Baroque
- Location: Manchester, Greater Manchester, England
- Coordinates: 53.4865°N 2.2407°W
- Current tenants: Amazon
- Construction started: 1905
- Completed: 1907
- Cost: Original cost £50,000, refurbishment circa £36 million
- Owner: NOMA

Technical details
- Structural system: Steel frame with in situ cast concrete floors

Design and construction
- Architects: F.E.L Harris; Refurbishment work completed by Sheppard Robson
- Awards and prizes: BCO Recycled / Refurbished Workplace 2019

Listed Building – Grade II
- Official name: Cooperative Wholesale Society
- Designated: 20 June 1988
- Reference no.: 1025287

The Hanover Building is a Grade II office building in the NOMA district of Manchester, England.

== Architecture ==
Hanover was built between 1905 and was officially open in 1907. The building was listed as a Grade II building in 1988. Hanover is forged from two original buildings, E Block, a Co-operative Wholesale Society drapery warehouse constructed in 1904 and Hanover, added in 1909 to create 100,000 square feet (9,300 m^{2}) of office and additional warehouse space. It was designed by Co-operative Wholesale Society architect F. E. L. Harris and was built using the newest construction techniques of its time. Over 1.5 million bricks were used during construction and the overall construction cost was £50,000 (equivalent to £4,977,000 in 2023).

Hanover is a good example of Edwardian Baroque architecture, constructed in red brick with polished granite and sandstone dressings. Local materials were used wherever possible, including Baxenden bricks, stone from Darley Dale in Derbyshire and granite from Aberdeen. The façade has pilasters and Corinthian order columns and the roof is concealed by parapet walls.

Originally, there was another floor which housed the Mitchell Memorial Hall – it was destroyed in the Manchester Blitz of 1940–41 and was never rebuilt. There are a series of medallions around the building which name all the places Cooperative Wholesale Society traded at the time of construction. During construction, a stonemason mis-spelt 'Sydney' as 'Sidney' – the correction can still be seen today.

== NOMA ==
The Co-operative Group colleagues migrated to One Angel Square in 2013 and Hanover now belongs to the NOMA regeneration scheme. As part of the plans, Hanover Building was the first listed building to be renovated. The renovation provided 91,000 sq ft (8,500 m^{2}) of Grade A office space and retail space facing out onto Corporation Street. The renovation was completed in September 2018.

== 2015 fire ==
On 12 October 2015, there was a fire on the E Block side of the building, destroying the top floor and roof area. Strip out works were already underway, and the fire delayed the refurbishment program by around two years.

== Amazon ==
In October 2018, Amazon confirmed its long-rumoured move into the Hanover Building, located in Manchester’s NOMA district, securing approximately 90,000 square feet of office space. The relocation marked Amazon’s first UK corporate office outside London and was internally codenamed “Project Oasis” during planning. The Hanover Building, a Grade II-listed Edwardian Baroque structure originally completed in 1907, underwent a £34 million refurbishment led by Sheppard Robson and contractor Russells to accommodate modern corporate use. Amazon officially opened its Manchester office on 16 January 2020, announcing the creation of over 600 jobs spanning technical and corporate roles, including software development engineers, applied scientists, and finance analysts. The site also supports Amazon’s outreach initiatives, including the Amazon Future Engineer Bursary for low-income students at the University of Manchester.

== See also ==
- Listed buildings in Manchester-M4
