= CIS Tower =

Office building in Manchester, England

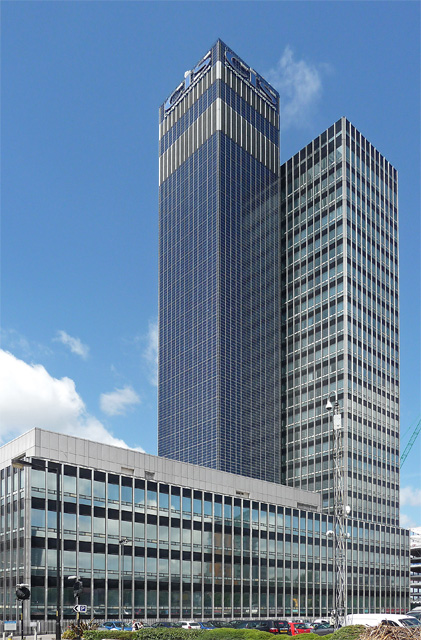
- The CIS Tower with solar panel-clad service tower (left) and glazed office tower (right)

- Location within Greater Manchester

Record height
- Tallest in United Kingdom from 1962 to 1963^{[I]}
- Preceded by: Shell Centre
- Surpassed by: Millbank Tower

General information
- Type: Office
- Architectural style: International Style
- Location: Miller Street, Manchester, England
- Coordinates: 53°29′11″N 2°14′18″W
- Construction started: September 1959
- Completed: 1962
- Opening: 22 October 1962
- Renovated: 2006
- Cost: £3.98 million
- Owner: SPV Devonshire (CIS Tower) Limited

Height
- Roof: 118 m (387 ft)

Technical details
- Floor count: 25
- Floor area: 388,000 ft^{2} (36,000 m^{2})

Design and construction
- Architects: Gordon Tait; G. S. Hay
- Developer: Co-operative Insurance Society
- Designations

Listed Building – Grade II
- Official name: Co-operative Insurance Society (CIS) Building
- Designated: 24 November 1995
- Reference no.: 1270494

The CIS Tower is a high-rise office building on Miller Street in Manchester, England. Designed for the Co-operative Insurance Society (CIS) by architects Gordon Tait and G. S. Hay, the building was completed in 1962 and rises to 118 metres (387 ft) in height. As of June 2026, the Grade II listed building is the 19th-tallest in Greater Manchester and the tallest office building in the United Kingdom outside London. The tower remained as built for over 40 years, until maintenance issues on the service tower required an extensive renovation, which included covering its façade in solar panels.

== Site ==
The tower is situated on Miller Street, which forms the Manchester Inner Ring Road, and stands adjacent to New Century House, a high-rise office building also designed by Gordon Tait and G. S. Hay and constructed concurrently for the CIS's parent company, the Co-operative Wholesale Society (CWS). The plot on which the building stands had been heavily bombed during World War II and subsequently cleared. The site chosen for CIS Tower and New Century House was one of two areas of land offered by the local authority; the other site was in Piccadilly, but this came with the condition that any development scheme had to include shops and a hotel. Not wishing to compromise their autonomy, the CIS board chose the Miller Street site.

Opposite the tower sits One Angel Square, which opened in 2013 and serves as the headquarters of the Co-operative Group (the successor to the CWS). The complex of buildings form NOMA (a portmanteau of 'North Manchester'), a 20 acres (8.1 hectares) area of land previously known as the Co-operative Estate. The area was developed by the Co-operative Group in a joint venture with Hermes Investment Management. In 2017 the Co-operative Group sold its stake in NOMA to Hermes Investment Management in order to focus on its core retail business, however, it remains a tenant in several buildings. More than 6,500 people work in the neighbourhood.

== Architecture ==
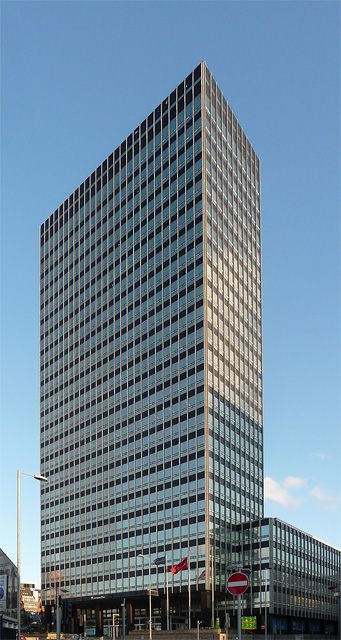
CIS Tower from Miller Street

=== Form ===
The office tower building rises above a five-storey podium block. Each of the podium floors is 75 m × 55 m (246 ft × 180 ft), providing 4,125 m^{2} (44,400 ft^{2}) of floor space per storey. Each office floor in the tower is 18 m × 44 m (59 ft × 144 ft), creating 727 m^{2} (7,830 ft^{2}) of floor space per storey. The tower element consists of the steel-framed main office building and a windowless reinforced concrete service tower. The service tower rises higher than the main office block and houses lifts and stairwells.

The building has a symmetrical plan, with the main tower rising up from the north-eastern end of the podium block and projecting at the front over the first two floors and the main entrance. The service tower is attached to the centre of the main tower's south-west side, forming a squat T-shape. In total, the building has 388,000 ft^{2} (36,000 m^{2}) of floor area, with clear open spaces on the office floors.

=== Façade ===
Both the office tower and podium feature glass curtain walls with metal window frames. Black vitreous enamel panels demarcate the floor levels. The building materials, glass, enamelled steel and aluminium, were chosen so that the building could remain clean in the polluted Manchester atmosphere.

The tower's concrete service shaft, which rises above the office tower, has two bands of vents at the top and was clad in a mosaic made up of 14 million centimetre-square grey tesserae. designed to shimmer and sparkle.

=== Interior ===
A green bronze-like, abstract mural sculpted by William Mitchell made from fibreglass covers the entrance hall's rear wall. Interiors were designed by Misha Black of the Design Research Unit. The executive areas are delineated by the use of teak and cherry wood veneers.

== History ==
=== Development ===
==== Planning ====
The CIS board of directors decided that a new headquarters was needed to accommodate its 2,500 staff, who were dispersed in 10 different buildings across Manchester. In January 1953, CIS General Manager Robert Dinnage told his board to begin planning a new head office and that year entered into initial discussions with Manchester Corporation (now Manchester City Council). The design brief for the building, devised by Dinnage, was threefold: to convey the prestige of the CIS and the co-operative movement; to improve the appearance of Manchester in which the Society was one of the largest financial organisations; and to provide first-class accommodation for the staff.

The CIS board formed a chief office premises sub-committee to oversee the project. A deputation of appointed architects, designers and directors travelled to Italy, the United States and Canada to examine contemporary office design. The tower's design was influenced by Skidmore, Owings & Merrill's Inland Steel Building in Chicago after a visit by the architects in 1958. Having viewed the Inland Steel Building, the project team decided to aim for clear unbroken floors unobstructed by lift shafts and toilets to provide maximum flexibility.

In 1958 the company proposed building an office tower block, designed by G. S. Hay, chief architect of the CWS with Gordon Tait of Sir John Burnet, Tait and Partners.

==== Construction ====
Construction began in September 1959 and was completed in 1962 at a cost of £3.98 million (equivalent to approximately £86.8 million in 2020). The main contractors for the CIS Tower were John Laing Construction Ltd, with A. E. Beer as the structural engineering consultant, and O. Castick, Chief Engineer of CWS as the engineering services consultant.

The CIS Tower was officially opened by Prince Philip, Duke of Edinburgh on 22 October 1962. At 118 m (387 ft), the tower overtook the Shell Centre as the tallest building in the United Kingdom, a title it retained for a year until it was replaced by the Millbank Tower in London. It remained the tallest building in Greater Manchester until it was surpassed by the Beetham Tower in 2006.

=== Renovation ===
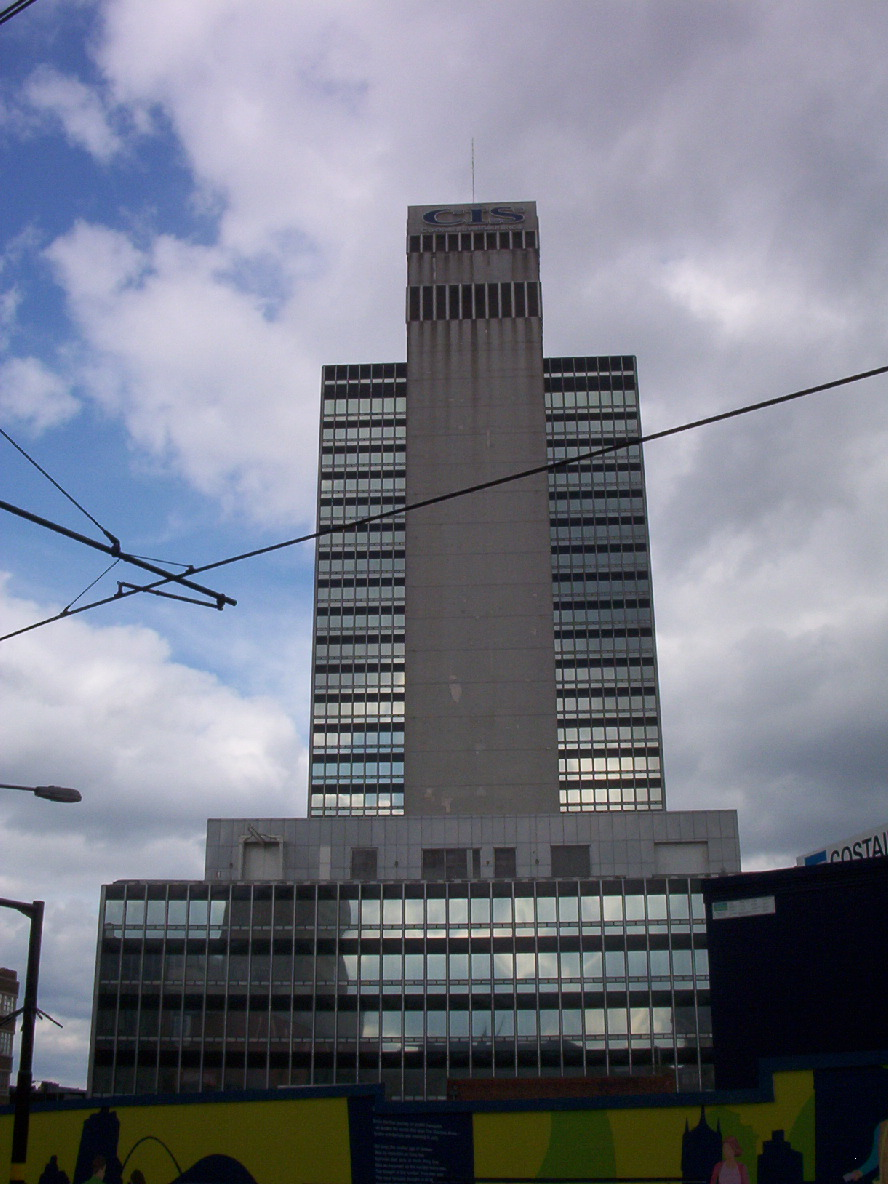
The original mosaic-clad tower in 2002, prior to its renovation

Within six months of construction, some of the mosaic tiles on the service tower became detached owing to cement failure and lack of expansion joints in the concrete. Although the tower was granted listed building status in 1995, falling tiles were an ongoing problem. English Heritage had to be consulted as alterations could change the building's appearance.

In 2004 CIS consulted Solarcentury with a view to replacing the deteriorating mosaic with 575.5 kilowatts (771.8 hp) of blue building-integrated photovoltaic (PV) cells which would generate approximately 180,000 kilowatt-hours (650,000 MJ) of electricity per year. The work was completed by Arup and at that time was the largest commercial solar façade in Europe. The PV cells made by Sharp Electronics began feeding electricity to the National Grid in November 2005.

The project, which cost £5.5 million, was partly funded by the Northwest Regional Development Agency which granted £885,000 and the Energy Savings Trust at the Department of Trade and Industry (DTI) contributed £175,000. The solar power project was chosen by the DTI as one of the "10 best green energy projects" of 2005.

=== Proposed redevelopment ===
In April 2025, it was reported that the development manager Lenrose Ventures was preparing a planning application for the comprehensive redevelopment of the CIS Tower, aiming to transform the vacant building into a modern, mixed-use destination. The proposed scheme will reconfigure the structure into three distinct zones: the "Tower" will offer workspace across 26 floors; the "Podium" will deliver flexible office floorplates; and the "Street" level will feature food, beverage, retail, and leisure amenities. The proposed overhaul seeks to bring the building up to contemporary standards. The planning application was submitted to Manchester City Council in late June and includes a 20,000-square-foot (1,900 m^{2}) restaurant spanning levels 25 and 26, alongside plans for a communal external terrace, a business lounge, and coworking space on level seven.

== Critical reception and listed status ==
Upon its completion, the tower was praised by the architectural press and was awarded the bronze medal by the Royal Institute of British Architects in 1962. In 1995 it was granted Grade II listed building status by English Heritage. The tower, described as "the best of the Manchester 1960s office blocks", was listed for its "discipline and consistency".

== See also ==
- Building-integrated photovoltaics
- List of tallest buildings and structures in Greater Manchester
- Listed buildings in Manchester-M60

Records
Preceded by Shell Centre	Tallest building in the United Kingdom; 1962—1963; 118m	Succeeded by Millbank Tower
Preceded by Manchester Town Hall	Tallest building in Manchester; 1962—2006; 118m	Succeeded by Beetham Tower
