= The Rochdale Pioneers =

- Official film poster
- Directed by: Adam Lee Hamilton and John Montegrande
- Written by: JS Papenbrock
- Produced by: John Montegrande; Kevin Atkinson
- Starring: John Henshaw; Robert Maxfield; John McArdle
- Release date: 11 November 2012 (UK)
- Running time: 57 minutes
- Country: United Kingdom
- Language: English
- Budget: <£90,000

The Rochdale Pioneers is a British biographical film, released in 2012, that tells the story of the foundation of the first successful cooperative retail store by working class members of the Rochdale Society of Equitable Pioneers, in 1844. This came at a time of chronic unemployment, poverty, hunger and social inequality, and it was met with prejudice and opposition.

A documentary, The Making of 'The Rochdale Pioneers', was also created to accompany the film.

== Background ==
The end of the Napoleonic Wars in 1815 brought with it famine, chronic unemployment and drastic wage cuts. These affects were especially common amongst textile weavers and spinners, and this – coupled with a lack of suffrage (voting rights) – led to calls for reform which culminated in the Peterloo Massacre of 1819 in Manchester, England when a peaceful demonstration of radical reformers was attacked by cavalry.

Several cooperative ventures had since been begun, in an attempt to improve conditions, but they had all failed, and the pioneers in Rochdale, too, were faced with a hard struggle.

The Rochdale pioneers' aim was to provide an affordable alternative to poor-quality and adulterated food and provisions, using "honest weights and measures", and to use any surplus to benefit the community. The vision and efforts of these twenty eight working-class men is recognized as the birth of the co-operative movement, and the Rochdale Principles which they developed formed the foundation of the principles still in use by the modern cooperative movement which now numbers around 1.4 million independent enterprises with nearly 1 billion members worldwide.

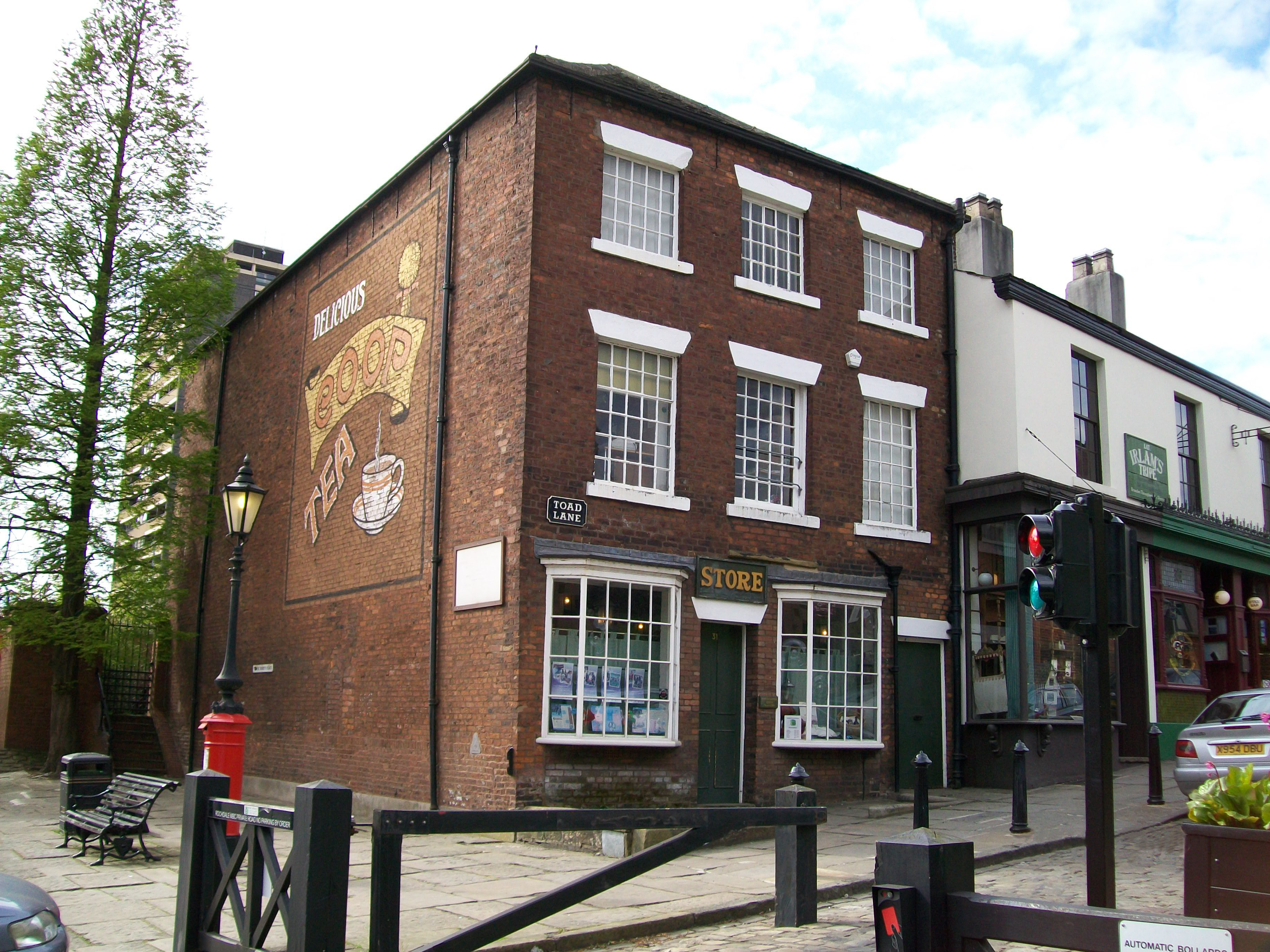
31 Toad Lane, where the Rochdale Pioneers started trading

The Rochdale Pioneers was inspired by the 1944 film, Men of Rochdale which had marked the centenary of the first shop's opening and had been in turn based upon G.J. Holyoake's The History of Co-operation.

The original shop at 31 Toad Lane in Rochdale in Lancashire, England opened on 21 December 1844 and was used for trading until 1867. It was re-opened in 1931 as the Rochdale Pioneers Museum and again reopened in 2012 after renovations costing £2.3 million.

== Plot ==
The story is set in 1844 when a group of working-class people from the town of Rochdale came together to change the unfair society they were living in.

Fed up with dishonest and corrupt shopkeepers selling poor quality products at high prices they decide to take matters into their own hands. By pooling the few resources they have, the group manage to get enough money together to open their own shop and pledge to only sell quality, unadulterated products, sharing the profits fairly with their customers.

The shop is only small and stocks just a handful of products like butter, flour and sugar, but the idea itself is revolutionary and the way they do business is fundamentally different in its nature.

== Cast ==
- John Henshaw as John Holt
- Andrew London as William Cooper
- Jordan Dawes as Samuel Ashworth
- Rachel Caffrey as Betty Cooper
- Jack Baldwin as Charles Howarth
- Matthew Stead as James Daly
- John Symes as Mr. Butterworth
- Josie Owen as Mrs. Croft
- Ian Pink as Mr. Leach
- Bob Young as John Shackell
- Darren White as James Smithies
- John McArdle as Dr. Dunlope
- Eric Hulme as Miles Ashworth
- Michael Whewell as James Standring
- Eliza Kempson as Mrs. Shackell
- Robert Maxfield as Mr. Smith
- Ian Jenkins as Robert the stallholder
- Rod Barry as Mr. Crowther
- Hazel Mrozek as Mrs. Charlesworth
- Jennifer O'Brien as Jenny Fletcher

== Production ==
Commissioned by The Co-operative Group and produced by the Co-operative British Youth Film Academy, The Rochdale Pioneers was released as part of the United Nations International Year of Cooperatives, 2012.

A documentary, The Making of 'The Rochdale Pioneers', was also created to accompany the film. This was directed and produced by Darren White.

Many of the cast and crew were recruited from local communities, to work alongside established actors like John Henshaw and John McArdle. Shooting was partly carried out in the historic Yorkshire village of Heptonstall, just a few miles from Rochdale.

== Screenings and availability ==
The Rochdale Pioneers premiered at Co-operatives United in Manchester, England on 1 November 2012. The television premiere was on Film4 on Sunday 11 November 2012.

== See also ==
- History of the cooperative movement
- The Hungry Forties
