= Ashworth (surname) =

Ashworth is an English surname. Notable people with the surname include:

- Abel Ashworth (1864–1938), English rugby union footballer
- Alan Ashworth (born 1960), British molecular biologist
- Alec Ashworth (1939–1995), English footballer
- Amy Ashworth (1924–2017), Dutch-born American activist
- Andrew Ashworth (born 1947), English criminologist
- Andrea Ashworth (born 1969), British writer and academic
- Barry Ashworth (footballer) (1942–2024), former English footballer
- Beverley Ashworth, voiceover artist best known as a former continuity announcer for Granada Television
- Caleb Ashworth (1722–1775), English dissenting tutor
- Charles Ashworth (died 1832), English major-general
- Charles W. Ashworth, known as Charlie Peacock, American record producer, recording artist
- Chris Ashworth (born 1975), American actor
- Dan Ashworth, English former professional footballer
- David Ashworth (1868–1947), English football referee and manager
- Dicken Ashworth (born 1946), English actor
- Donald Ashworth (born 1931), American musician
- Eddie Ashworth (born 1955), American record producer
- Ernie Ashworth, American country music singer
- Frank Ashworth (1926–2021), Canadian ice hockey player
- Fred Ashworth (1907–unknown), English professional rugby league footballer
- Frederick Ashworth (1912–2005), United States naval officer
- Gary Ashworth (born 1960) a British entrepreneur, business coach, author, and property developer
- Gerry Ashworth (born 1942), American sprinter
- Henry Ashworth (nonconformist) (1794–1880), Industrialist
- Herman Ashworth (1973–2005), American murderer
- James Ashworth, British soldier
- James Ashworth (footballer) (1902–1977), English footballer
- James Ashworth (runner) (born 1957), British marathon runner
- Jean Ashworth Bartle (born 1947), Canadian choral conductor
- Jeanne Ashworth (1938–2018), American former speed skate
- Jenn Ashworth (born 1982), English writer
- Jimmy Ashworth (1918–1990), Irish footballer
- Joe Ashworth (1943–2002), English footballer
- John Ashworth (disambiguation)
- Katy Ashworth, British children's television presenter
- Leigh Ashworth (18th century), British privateer
- Luke Ashworth (born 1989), English footballer
- Nesta Maude Ashworth (1893–1982), Girl Guider
- Pat Ashworth (1930–2023), British nursing sister
- Peter Ashworth, British photographer
- Philip Arthur Ashworth (1853–1921), British lawyer
- Philip Ashworth (born 1953), English footballer
- Richard Ashworth (born 1947), English Conservative politician
- Ricky Ashworth (born 1982), English speedway rider
- Samuel Ashworth (1877–1925), English amateur footballer
- Samuel Ashworth (co-operator) (1825–1871), English co-operator
- Stephanie Ashworth (born 1974), bass player for Australian band 'Something for Kate'
- Susan Ashworth, 19th-century British artist
- Thomas Ashworth (1864–1935), Australian politician
- Tom Ashworth (born 1977), American footballer
- Veronica Ashworth (1910–1977), British RAF officer and nurse
- Virgis M. Ashworth (1911–1975), American politician

== Fiction ==
The family of Ashworth characters in the British soap opera Hollyoaks

- List of Hollyoaks characters (2005)#Bill Ashworth
- Hannah Ashworth
- Josh Ashworth
- Neville Ashworth
- List of Hollyoaks characters (2007)#Noel Ashworth
- Rhys Ashworth
- Suzanne Ashworth
