= Rochdale pioneers =

Rochdale Pioneers may refer to:

- The Rochdale Society of Equitable Pioneers, an early consumer cooperative at the genesis of the modern co-operative movement
- The Rochdale Pioneers (2012 film), a British feature film about the Rochdale Society of Equitable Pioneers
- The Rochdale Pioneers Museum, an exhibition centre in Rochdale, Greater Manchester, England
