= Braund =

Braund is a surname. Notable people with the surname include:

- Allin Braund (1915–2004), English artist
- Dorothy Mary Braund (1926–2013), Australian artist
- George Braund (1866–1915), Australian soldier and politician
- Len Braund (1875–1955), English cricketer
- Mark Braund, English chief executive
- Rhiannon Braund, New Zealand academic and registered pharmacist
- Susanna Braund (born 1957), professor of Latin poetry
- William Braund, merchant
