= John Ashworth =

John Ashworth may refer to:

- John Ashworth (cricketer) (1850–1901), English cricketer
- John Ashworth (footballer), English professional footballer
- John Ashworth (judge) (1906–1975), England judge and barrister
- John Ashworth (preacher) (1813–1875), English preacher, manufacturer, and author
- John Ashworth (rugby union) (born 1949), New Zealand rugby union player
- John Ashworth (biologist) (1938–2025), British educationalist and scientist
- John Ashworth (priest) (1900–1972), Dean of Trinidad

== See also ==
- Jon Ashworth (born 1978), British Labour Party politician and MP
