= Ashworth =

Ashworth may refer to:

== Places ==
=== Antarctica ===
- Mount Ashworth
- Ashworth Glacier

=== United Kingdom ===
- Ashworth, Greater Manchester, England
- Ashworth Hospital in Merseyside, England
- Ashworth Moor Reservoir, Lancashire

=== United States ===
- Ashworth Archaeological Site, a significant archaeological site in Point Township, Indiana
- Ashworth College, online college based in Georgia

== Other uses ==
- Ashworth Act, a Texas law concerning free African Americans
- Ashworth (clothing) a golf apparel company
- Ashworth Improvement Plan, a report that recommended a number of improvements to be made to the electrified suburban railways of inner city Melbourne, Australia
- Ashworth scale, a measure of spasticity
- Ashworth (surname)
