= Boughton Fen =

UK Site of Special Scientific Interest

Coordinates: 52.583°N 0.534°E

- Site of Special Scientific Interest
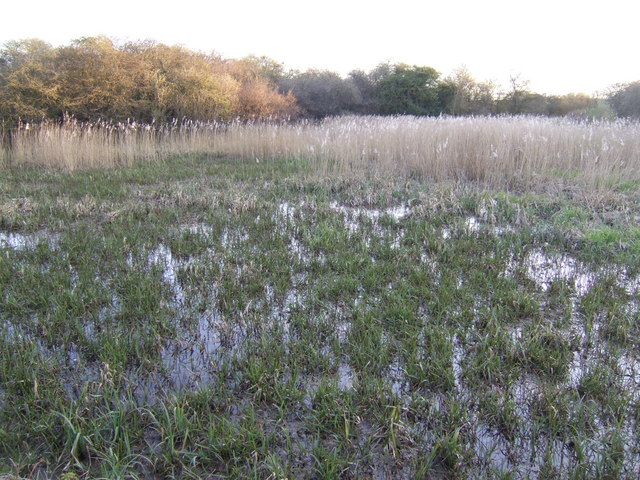
- Location of Boughton Fen.
- Area of search: Norfolk, England
- Grid reference: TF 718 014
- Interest: Biological
- Area: 15.7 hectares (39 acres)
- Notification date: 1983
- Location map: Magic Map

Boughton Fen is a 15.7-hectare (39-acre) biological Site of Special Scientific Interest east of Downham Market in Norfolk, England. it is common land registered to Boughton Parish Council.

This valley in a tributary of the River Wissey is covered by tall fen over most of the site, together with areas of scrub which provide a habitat for breeding birds. There are many uncommon species of moths, including the rare Perizoma sagittaria.

There is access to the site from Oxborough Road.
