= IQ Analytics =

British Employment agency

- Company type: Member company of InterQuest Group
- Headquarters: London, UK
- Key people: Chris Eldridge, CEO of InterQuest Group plc
- Website: IQ Analytics

IQ Analytics is a member company of AIM listed recruitment organisation the InterQuest Group.

Formerly known as Intelect, IQ Analytics joined the InterQuest Group in 2007. IQ Analytics are a specialist analytics focused recruitment organisation with offices in London and Manchester. Though the majority of their business is based in the UK, they also place a significant amount of their focus on clients within the US market.
