= Miles Ashworth =

Rochdale Pioneer co-operator (1792–1868)

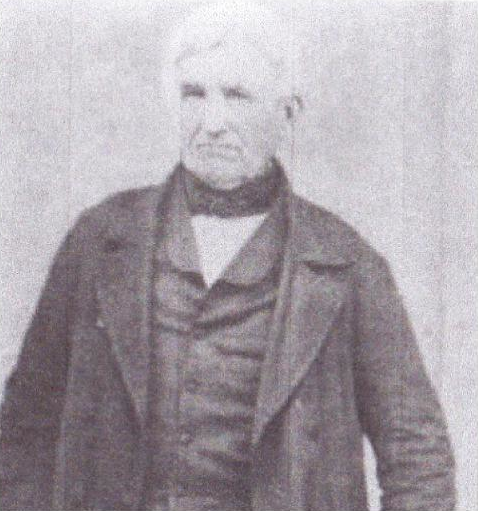
- Baptised: 29 January 1792; Rochdale, Lancashire, England
- Died: 13 April 1868 (aged 76); Rochdale, Lancashire, England
- Occupations: Co-operator; Weaver; Marine
- Movement: Co-operative; Chartist
- Spouse: Jane Howarth (m. 1823)
- Children: 7, including Samuel Ashworth

Miles Ashworth (bapt. 29 January 1792 – 13 April 1868) was an English co-operator, weaver, chartist, and marine. In 1844 he was a founding member of the Rochdale Society of Equitable Pioneers and served as the society's first president. He was father to fellow Rochdale Pioneer Samuel Ashworth.

== Biography ==
Ashworth was born to William and Ann Ashworth and was baptised on the 29 January 1792 in Rochdale, Lancashire. He served as a marine during the Napoleonic Wars on HMS Bellerophon where he guarded Napoleon following his capture by the British in 1815. After leaving the navy he became a weaver and in 1823 married Jane Howarth with whom he went on to have seven children.

In 1844 he was a founding member of the Rochdale Society of Equitable Pioneers and was elected the society's first president. In 1845 he became a trustee of the co-op, with Charles Howarth succeeding him as president.

In 1848 he moved to Minster Lovell to join his son Samuel to work as a farmer as part of the Chartist Land Plan but after six months Samuel sold the plot and they returned to Rochdale.

Ashworth died in Rochdale on the 13 April 1868 at the age of 76.
