= Frances C. Jenkins =

American evangelist (1826–1915)

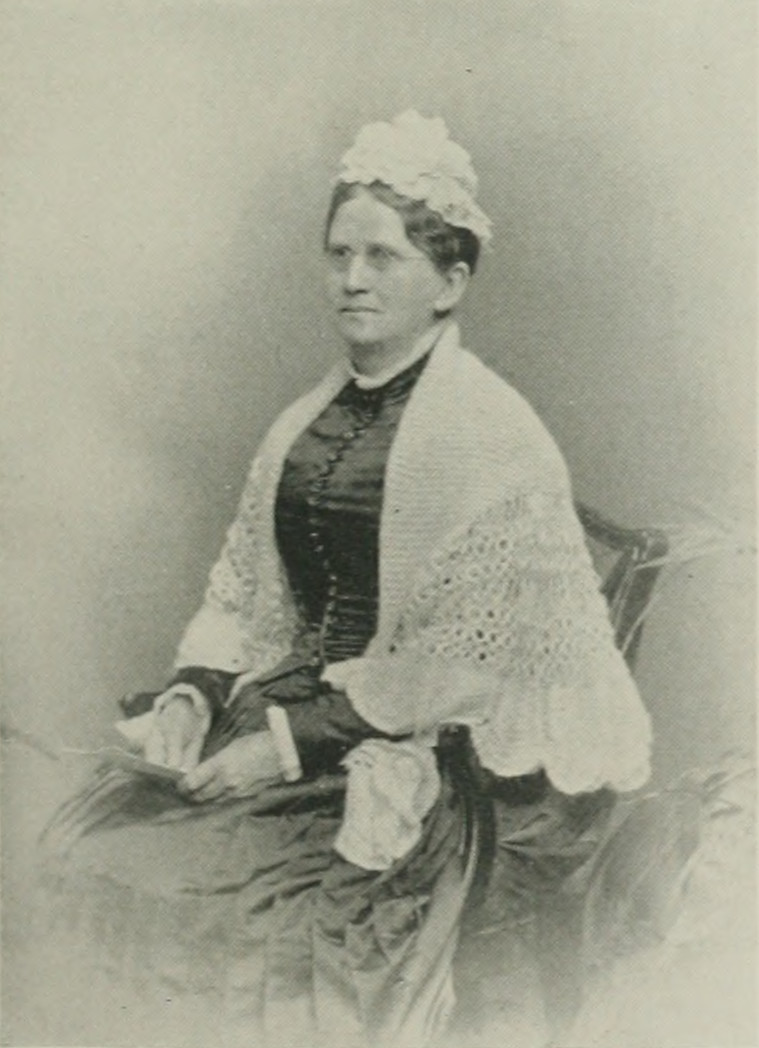
- Photo in A Woman of the Century

Personal life
- Born: Frances Clanton Wiles; April 13, 1826 New Castle, Indiana,
- Died: December 14, 1915 (aged 89) Kansas City, Missouri, U.S.
- Resting place: Wabash, Indiana, U.S.
- Spouse: Benjamin F. Jenkins (m. 1843; died 1889)
- Children: 11
- Known for: evangelist; temperance activist; suffragist

Religious life
- Religion: Quakers
- Church: Friends' Church, 30th Street and Bales Avenue, Kansas City, Missouri
- Profession: minister

Frances C. Jenkins (née, Wiles; April 13, 1826 – December 14, 1915) was an American evangelist, Quaker minister, and social reformer, involved in the temperance and suffrage movements of the day. While in Illinois, she served as a vice-president of the state's Woman's Christian Temperance Union (W.C.T.U.). She came to Kansas City, Missouri about 1880 and was active in church and club work there. It was chiefly through her influence that the Friends' Church at 30th Street and Bales Avenue was organized in that city in 1882. Several times since 1890, Jenkins was pastor of this church. In Kansas City, she was the first president of the Federation of Women's Clubs and was also president of the first equal suffrage organization in that town.

== Early life and education ==
Frances Clanton Wiles was born in New Castle, Indiana, April 13, 1826. Her father, Luke Wiles (b. 1796), was of Welsh descent; her mother, Rhoda (Davis) Wiles (1804–1853), came from an English family. There were 12 siblings: Elizabeth, Thomas, William, Keziah, Daniel, Martha, Nathan, Rhoda, Luke, Nancy, Ester, and Anna.

Both parents being educators, Jenkins' home was always a school.

She married young, in 1843, and consequently did not finish her education, though she continued studying after marriage, with interests in medicine and theology.

== Career ==
For several years after her marriage, she devoted herself exclusively to homemaking and her family. When she was ready to broaden her circle of usefulness, she took up church work in her own church, Quakers. She became so efficient in various kinds of church work and so devoted as a Bible student that the Society of Friends recognized her ability and, at the age of 26, recorded her a minister of the gospel. The Friends Society was at that time the only orthodox one to recognize women as ministers. Her public work became a prominent feature of her life.

In various places in Eastern Illinois, Jenkins spent much time in home missionary work. Though that was useful, in March 1870, she renounced the comforts of home and accepted the hardships associated with providing her services outside her home region. Jenkins was especially successful as an evangelist and temperance worker. She was among the first crusaders against the liquor traffic. As a result of her work, many saloons were closed in the town where she lived, and many surrounding towns received a like benefit. The proprietors of numerous saloons gave up saloon-keeping and engaged permanently in other business. For several years, she was one of the vice-presidents of the Illinois W.C.T.U.

"I believe as a church we have not been definite of purpose, definite of action, and definite of expression. We have lacked that." (Frances C. Jenkins, 1887)

She was an appointed delegate to the Biennial Bible-school Conference (Philadelphia, November 1875).

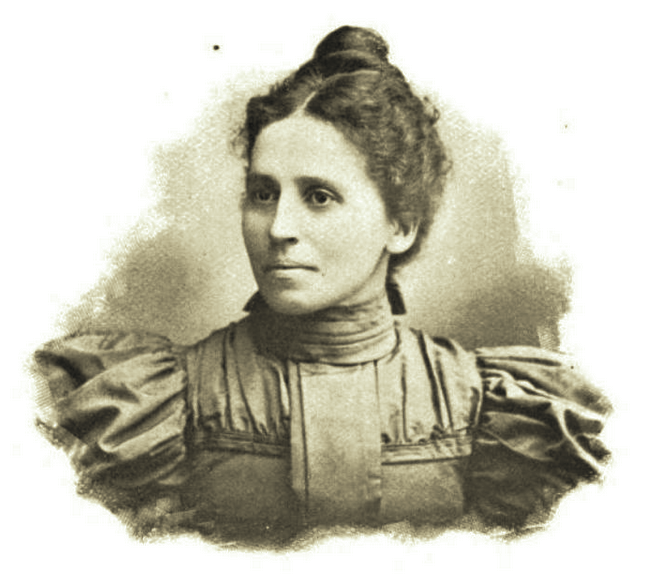
Stella Frances Jenkins (1898)

Jenkins went to England early in January, 1888, where she remained 15 months, engaged in evangelical and temperance work. A report in February 1889 described that having completed her visits in Westmorland, Jenkins proceeded into Lancashire, attending the Monthly Meeting at Lancaster and the Quarterly Meeting at Preston. She also visited Rochdale and Oldham, having amongst other services attended a meeting at the John Ashworth’s "Chapel for the Destitute". She was expecting to go to Manchester, though the effects of a fall sustained by her at Penrith were not fully passed off. Jenkins returned to the U.S. by the SS City of New York on April 17, 1889. Thereafter, she continued to be engaged most of the time in work along the same lines.

== Personal life ==
On November 23, 1843, she married Benjamin F. Jenkins (1823–1889). They had 11 children: Anderson, Elizabeth, Rhoda, Eli, Martha, Thomas, Lydia, Luke, Stella, Eva, and Anna. Stella Frances Jenkins, also a minister of the Friends Church, Kansas City, Missouri, published An Interpretation of the Gospel According to Friends: A Sketch (1898) and dedicated it to her parents.

From about 1880, Jenkins made her home in Kansas City, Missouri. She died there, December 14, 1915, and was buried in Wabash, Indiana.
