= Rochdale Pioneers Museum =

Museum in Greater Manchester, England

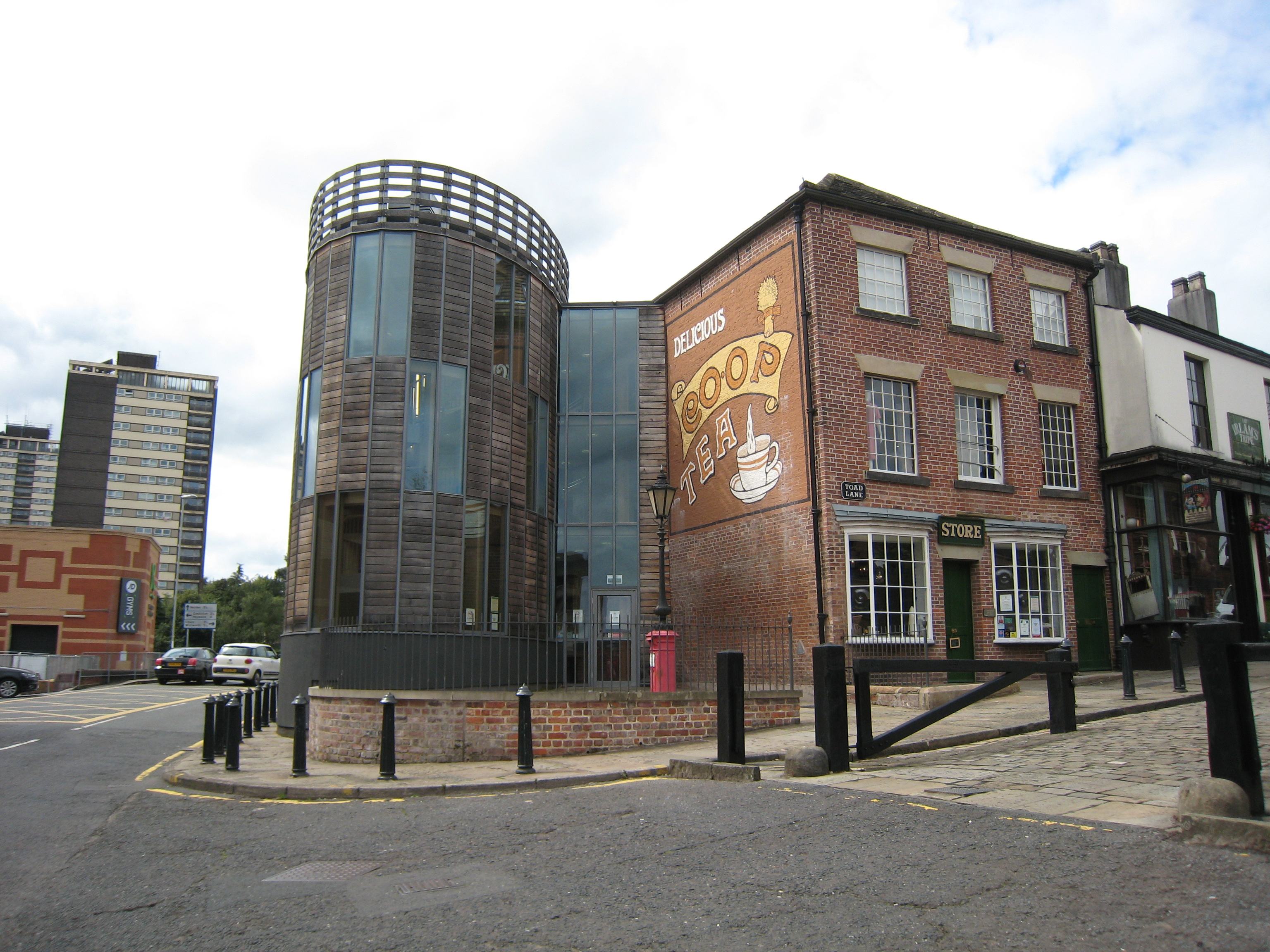
- Original brick building and 2012 extension

- Location within Greater Manchester
- Established: 1931
- Location: 31 Toad Lane, Rochdale, Greater Manchester, England
- Coordinates: 53.6187°N 2.15943°W
- Type: Collection, heritage centre
- Website: www.co-operativeheritage.coop

Listed Building – Grade II
- Official name: 31, Toad Lane
- Designated: 25 October 1951
- Reference no.: 1084256

The Rochdale Pioneers Museum is housed in the building where the Rochdale Equitable Pioneers Society began trading on 21 December 1844. The museum is regarded as the birthplace of the modern co-operative movement and is located in Rochdale, Greater Manchester, England.

The museum includes a recreation of the original shop, featuring its rudimentary furniture, scales, and items that were sold there. It also illustrates the influence of the co-operative movement on issues such as women's rights, poverty, education, fair trade, and social reform. The museum is owned and operated by the Co-operative Heritage Trust.

== History ==
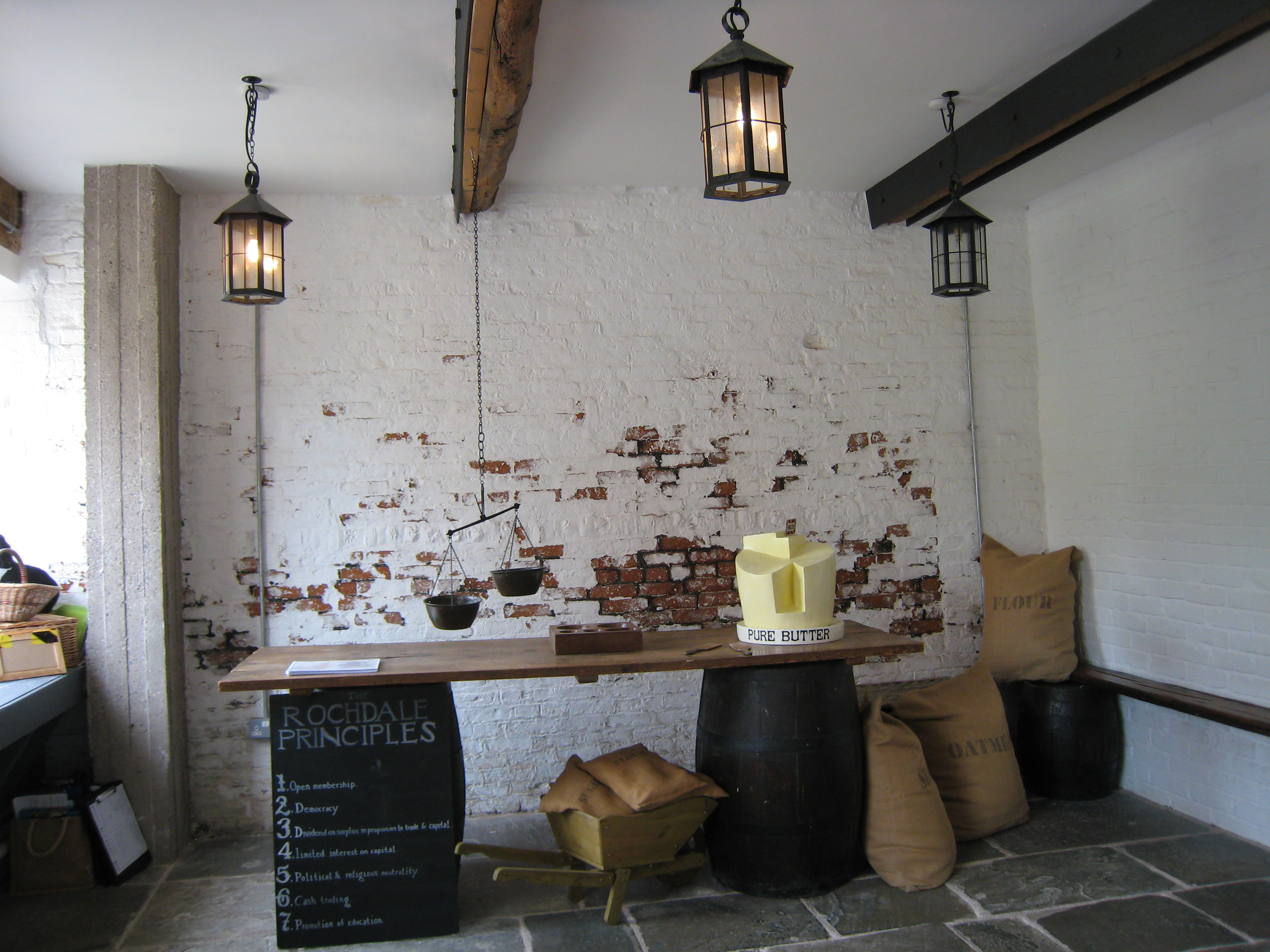
Interior of the shop, now the entrance to the museum

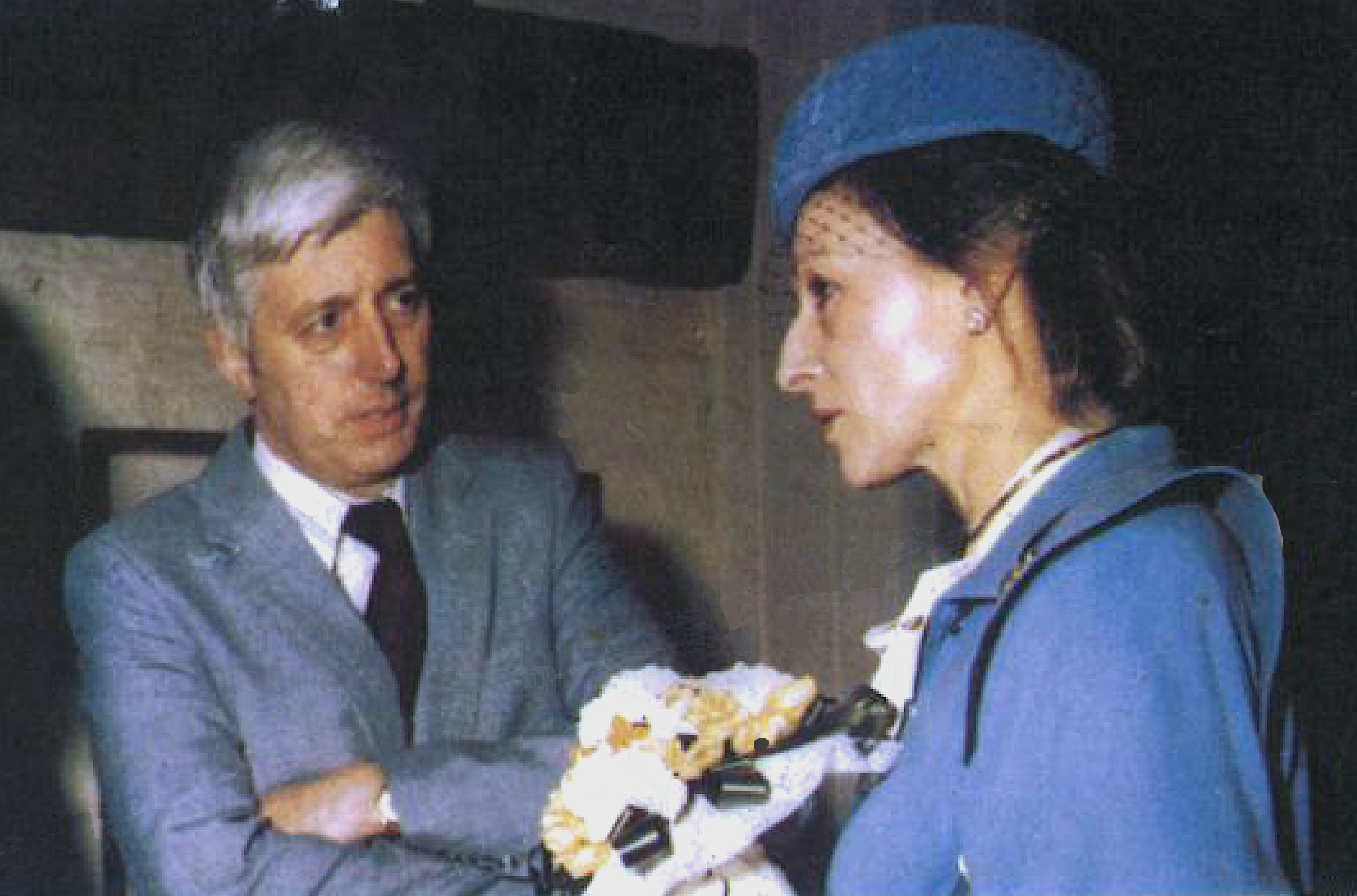
HRH Princess Alexandra attending the reopening of the museum in 1981 with architect Roy Collins who was responsible for saving the building from structural collapse

=== The building ===
31 Toad Lane was originally an 18th-century warehouse on a busy road that then extended to the centre of the town. In 1844 the Co-operative Society rented the ground floor, while the upper floors were used by the Methodist society. A counter was made from a plank on barrels, and the shop began trading. From 1849 the Co-op rented the entire building and developed a library, meeting room, and a boot and shoe department. In the 1860s, other buildings were rented, and in 1867 the society moved to new purpose-built premises. The building later became a pet shop.

=== The museum ===
The Rochdale Pioneers quickly became an inspiration to a wide section of society, and the co-operative movement gained national and international recognition. As a result, the Co-operative Union purchased the building at 31 Toad Lane in 1925, expressly to create a museum commemorating the birthplace of co-operation. The museum first opened in 1931.

31 Toad Lane was designated a Grade II listed building in 1951.

In the 1970s, the museum was closed for several years after structural problems were discovered, and by the end of the decade the building was on the verge of collapse. CWS architect Roy Collins was entrusted with saving the building; his bold solution involved inserting a reinforced concrete cage inside the structure to provide strength while leaving the exterior walls 9 inches (23 cm) "out of plumb" to preserve its period character. Rochdale Council redeveloped the remaining section of Toad Lane outside the building, which had been a cul-de-sac since the 1960s. The new features included cobbled streets flanked by 19th-century gas lamps and a unique Victorian post box. The renovation scheme won a Civic Trust Award in 1981 for its "great sensitivity" and for being "a good example of achievement by public and private enterprise". The official reopening in 1981 was attended by HRH Princess Alexandra.

In 2000 the management of the Rochdale Pioneers Museum was transferred to the Co-operative College, and it became a registered museum in 2001. In 2010 it received a £1.3 million Heritage Lottery Fund award and reopened in 2012 after a £2.3 million revamp, which included an extension with additional rooms, restoration of the third floor, and improvements to the displays.

== The museum exhibition ==
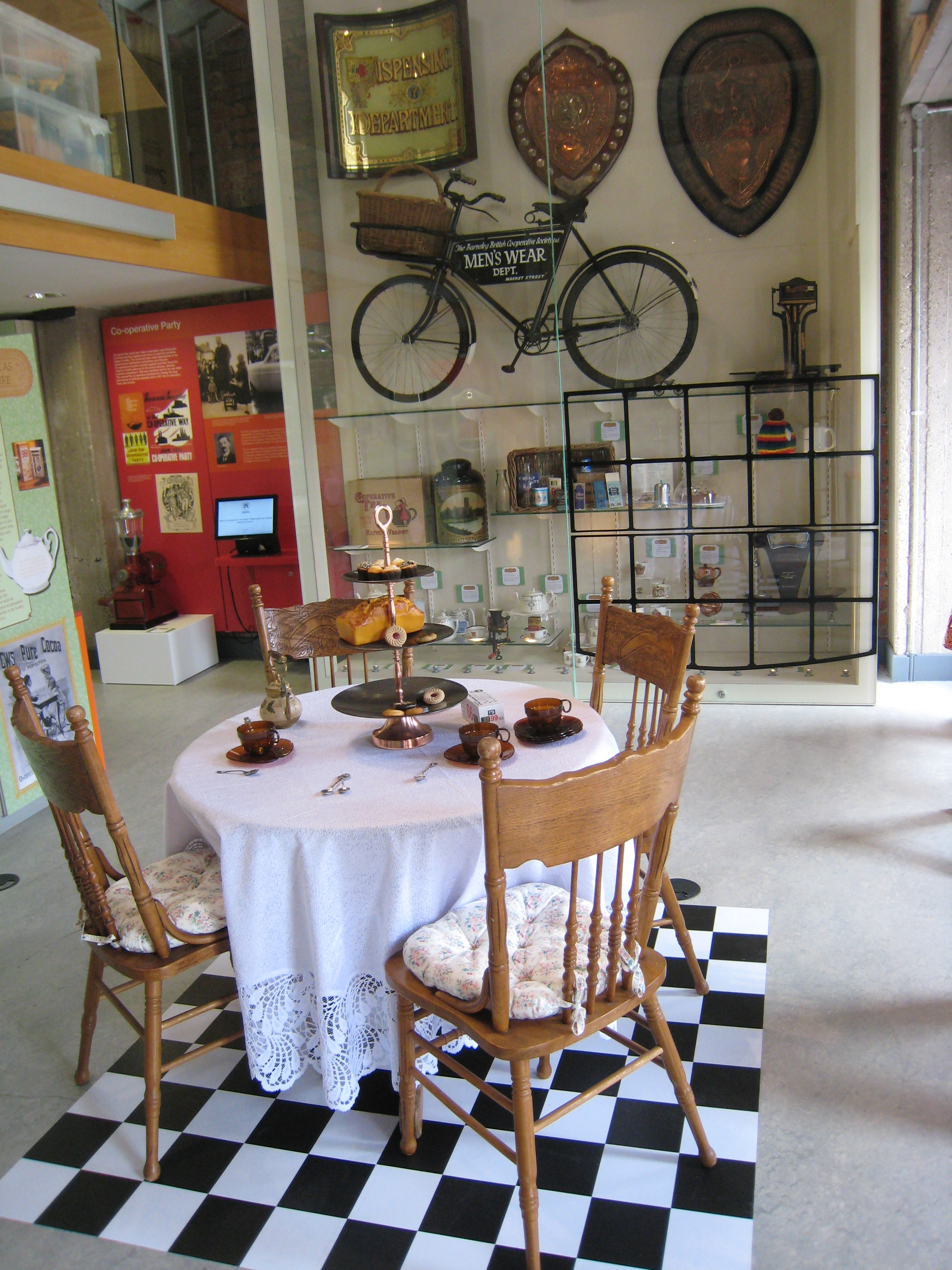
Part of the first floor: a tea table showing Co-op tea, biscuits, and cakes

The museum provides insight into the co-operative movement, from its roots in Rochdale to the circumstances that led to the formation of the Rochdale Society of Equitable Pioneers and its subsequent social impact and growth both domestically and internationally. It also highlights the importance of individuals who have had a significant influence on the movement.

The main themes of the museum are:

- the development of the early co-operative movement
- the Rochdale Principles
- inspirational co-operators
- history of retail
- the growth of the movement, and its 20th-century social history
- international co-operation

== See also ==
- History of the Co-operative Movement
- Listed buildings in Rochdale
- National Co-operative Archive
- The Rochdale Pioneers (2012 film)
