= James Daly (co-operator) =

Irish-born co-operative movement organiser

- Baptised: 20 February 1811; Killarney, County Kerry, Ireland
- Died: 29 December 1849; On the SS Transit, Mid-Atlantic
- Occupations: Co-operator; Joiner
- Movement: Co-operative
- Spouse: Alice Ashurst (m. 1832)
- Children: 8

James Daly (bapt. 20 February 1811 – 29 December 1849) was an Irish-born co-operative movement organiser, Owenite, joiner, and founding member of the Rochdale Society of Equitable Pioneers.

== Biography ==
Daly was born to Charles Daly and Ellen Egan and was baptised on 20 February 1811 in Killarney, County Kerry, Ireland. In 1832 he married Alice Ashurst in Liverpool.

Daly moved to Rochdale, Lancashire, where he worked as a joiner and was active in the Owenite movement. In 1844 he was a founding member of the Rochdale Society of Equitable Pioneers, becoming its first secretary. He also worked with Charles Howarth on writing up the rules of the society and had occasional work for the society as a shopfitter.

Due to their poverty, Daly and his wife decided to emigrate to Texas in the hope of starting a co-operative community. However, Daly died of cholera on 29 December 1849 in the mid-Atlantic aboard the SS Transit. He was buried at sea. His wife and youngest child also died on the voyage and their other children were subsequently put up for adoption in New Orleans.
