= Samuel Ashworth (co-operator) =

English co-operator (1825–1871)

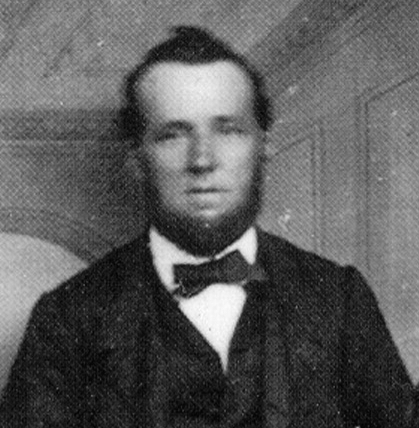
- Ashworth in 1865
- Born: 15 January 1825; Nr Rochdale, Lancashire, England
- Died: 2 February 1871 (aged 46); Rochdale, Lancashire, England
- Occupations: Flannel weaver; Shop worker; Buyer
- Movement: Co-operative
- Spouse: Alice Holden (m. 1853)
- Children: 4
- Father: Miles Ashworth

Samuel Ashworth (15 January 1825 – 2 February 1871) was an English co-operative movement organiser, flannel weaver, shop worker, and founding member of the Rochdale Society of Equitable Pioneers. He was the son of fellow Rochdale Pioneer Miles Ashworth.

== Biography ==
Ashworth was born on the 15 January 1825 near Rochdale, Lancashire to Miles and Jane Ashworth. Miles was a weaver who was also active in the co-operative movement. Like his father, Ashworth became a flannel weaver.

In 1844 Ashworth was, alongside his father, a founding member of the Rochdale Society of Equitable Pioneers. He and William Cooper were the co-op's first shopkeepers. In 1847 he moved to Minster Lovell to work as a farmer as part of the Chartist Land Plan but after six months he sold his plot and returned to Rochdale and his previous employment. Ashworth became the Pioneers' first buyer and later manager.

In 1866 Ashworth left the Rochdale Pioneers to become chief buyer and salesman of the North of England Co-operative Wholesale Society (later the English Co-operative Wholesale Society).

Ashworth died on 2 February 1871, aged 46, following a lengthy illness and was buried in Rochdale cemetery. He was survived by his wife and two of his children.
