= Gary Ashworth =

British entrepreneur, business coach, author (born 1960)

- Born: Gary Peter Ashworth; 1960 (age 65–66); United Kingdom
- Occupation: Entrepreneur
- Years active: 1982–present
- Known for: Founder of Abacus Recruitment, InterQuest
- Title: Chairman, Albany Beck Consulting
- Website: www.garyashworth.com

Gary Peter Ashworth (born 23 April 1960) is a British entrepreneur, business coach, author, and property developer. He founded the recruitment firm Abacus Recruitment and the technology staffing company InterQuest Group.

== Career ==
Ashworth opted for an early career in business, moving to London at 18 to work in accountancy recruitment. At aged 21, he set up his own business, Abacus Recruitment. Founded in February 1982, Abacus Recruitment was floated on the London Stock Exchange in September 1995. The company was sold to Carlisle Holdings in 1998, generating a tenfold return for initial investors Ashworth exited Abacus in 1999, aged 39.

In 1999 Ashworth took a joint stake in Lionheart Management alongside investors Jim Mellon and Luke Johnson. In November 2001, he founded the InterQuest Group to focus on technology staffing and digital recruitment services.

Ashworth sold InterQuest group in 2024.
