= James Smithies =

English co-operator (1819–1869)

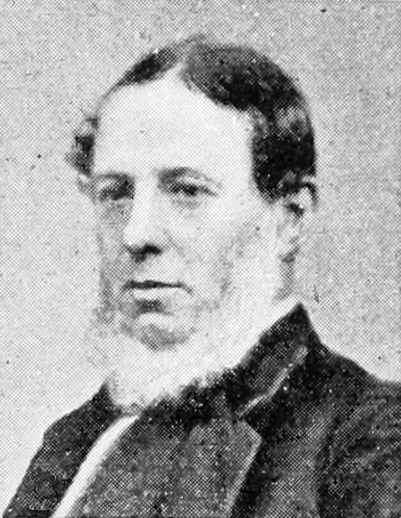
- Born: Huddersfield, Yorkshire, England
- Baptised: 14 November 1819
- Died: 27 May 1869; Rochdale, Lancashire, England
- Occupations: Wool stapler; Co-operator
- Movement: Co-operative; Owenism
- Spouse: Penelope Holmes (m. 1843)
- Children: 7+

James Smithies (bapt. 14 November 1819 – 27 May 1869) was an English co-operative movement organiser, wool-stapler, and local politician. In 1844 he was a founding member of the Rochdale Society of Equitable Pioneers. In March 1857, David Urquhart's Rochdale Foreign Affairs Committee appointed Smithies as its chairman. It was this connection which led in July 1859 to his being elected secretary of the new Rochdale Subscription Turkish Bath Society, and the opening on 14 November 1859 of the first Victorian Turkish bath to be co-operatively owned by its members.
