= InterQuest Group Ltd =

British recruitment business

- Type: Private
- Founded: 2001
- Headquarters: Salford, UK
- Website: InterQuest Group

InterQuest Group Ltd is a recruitment business that specialises within high growth areas of the new digital economy – information security, analytics, digital, telecom and technology. InterQuest Group operates across all industry sectors with a particular focus on financial markets, public sector and professional services.

The InterQuest Group has its head office in Salford, with additional offices throughout the UK. In December 2013 the London Stock Exchange listed the InterQuest Group amongst its "1000 Companies to inspire Britain".

== History ==
InterQuest has been trading since 2001, but the acquisition of the individual brands give the company a combined recruitment experience of more than 100 years. During this time, InterQuest Group has grown to a £151 million turnover company.

InterQuest Group's growth has happened as a result of both organic growth and strategic acquisition. The organic growth has come about as a result of a multi-brand strategy which permits each brand to operate within a clearly defined area technical specialisation – information security, analytics, digital, telecom and technology.

In 2012/2013 the InterQuest Group underwent a large scale restructuring, which alongside their acquisition of ECOM, was largely attributed to its posting of positive annual financial reports in early 2014.

== Brands ==
=== ECOM Recruitment ===
ECOM Recruitment
- Type: Private
- Founded: 1999
- Headquarters: London, UK
- Areas served: London; Manchester; New York; Amsterdam; Berlin
- Website: ECOM Recruitment

ECOM Recruitment is a recruitment business that specialises within the digital marketplace covering disciplines across UX, design, development, technology, product and project management, marketing and eCommerce. It is a subsidiary of InterQuest Group Ltd and is based in London with operations in Manchester and New York.

==== History ====
ECOM was established in Camden, London in 1999 and experienced a period of growth in the digital industry, recruiting talent for numerous companies in the Top 100 (New Media Age) list of digital agencies. They also worked with a number of recognisable brands in the UK including Retailers, Dot-com companies, Media, Publishing and FMCG businesses.

ECOM Recruitment Ltd was acquired by IT staffing firm InterQuest Group in November 2013 and its consultants operated in the digital industries across the UK. In 2015, ECOM's London based division was restructured to counter the challenging environment with lower than expected volume of work from the agency sector.

==== Events ====
ECOM operates a specialist model of recruitment where their consultants attend meetups and training events for the people that they recruit. They have sponsored and exhibited at events such as UXey, UX In The City in 2017 and 2018, Deliver Conference 2018, UpFront Conference, NUX6, NUX7 and NUX8. ECOM also hosts events at their offices for local digital talent to attend such as London Python Sprints in London and UX Sessions in Manchester.

== In the media ==
InterQuest plays an active role in establishing best practice and standards for human resources and staffing professionals, working with industry bodies like the CIPD and REC in outlining best practice and standards. InterQuest's former CEO Mark Braund was a regular contributor for the Huffington Post on topics including technology, analytics, recruitment and HR. InterQuest Group's senior management team have contributed to various publications and websites, including the Huffington Post, Information Age, Computer World UK, the Financial Times, The Staffing Stream, OnRec and Recruiter.
