= Pat Ashworth =

British intensive care sister (1930–2023)

Pat Ashworth SRN, SCM, FRCN, FFNRCSI
- Born: 1930
- Died: 26 January 2023 (aged 92–93); Portstewart, Northern Ireland

Pat Ashworth SRN, SCM, FRCN, FFNRCSI (1930 – 26 January 2023) was a British nursing sister who specialised in intensive care.

Ashworth was born in Maidstone, with her family moving to Hastings before she was evacuated during World War II due to bombing. She started nursing at the age of 17 in Maidstone, qualified at Kent County Ophthalmic and Aural Hospital, Guy's Hospital, Jessop Hospital and Nether Edge Hospital.

Ashworth worked in a number of nursing roles until 1973, then a Department of Health and Social Security fellowship until 1976, followed by a joint clinical/academic post at Manchester Royal Infirmary and the University of Manchester until 1979.

Ashworth was Manchester's research programme manager at their WHO collaborating centre for nursing from 1979 to 1985; then a senior lecturer in nursing at the University of Ulster from 1985 to 1990.

Ashworth served as founding editor of the journal Intensive Care Nursing (later Intensive and Critical Care Nursing) from 1985 to 2000.

In 1979 she was awarded Fellowship of the Royal College of Nursing.

Ashworth died in Portstewart, Northern Ireland on 26 January 2023.
