= William Cooper (co-operator) =

English co-operator (1822–1868)

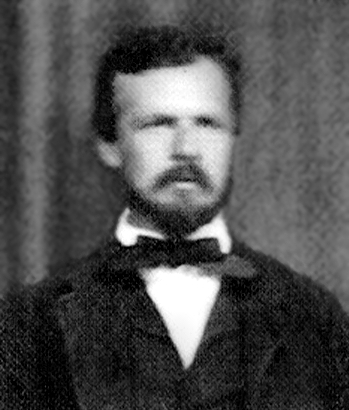
- Cooper in 1865
- Born: 1822; Rochdale, Lancashire, England
- Died: 31 October 1868 (aged 46); Rochdale, Lancashire, England
- Occupations: Co-operator; Fustian cutter; Weaver; Shop cashier
- Movement: Co-operative
- Spouse: Betty Smith (m. 1844)
- Children: 6

William Cooper (1822 – 31 October 1868) was an English co-operator, Owenite, and a founding member of the Rochdale Society of Equitable Pioneers.

Cooper played a leading role in promoting the success of the Rochdale Pioneers through written correspondence, speeches, and newspaper pieces. He believed the co-operative movement should extend beyond retail trade and he played a role in establishing the Rochdale District Co-operative Corn Mill Society in 1850, the Rochdale Co-operative Manufacturing Society in 1854, the North of England Co-operative Wholesale Society in 1863, and the Co-operative Insurance Society in 1867.

== Biography ==
Cooper was born in Rochdale, Lancashire in 1822 to a weaver, James Cooper, and Susan (née Taylor). He became a fustian cutter by trade, then a weaver, and joined the Owenite movement in the early 1840s. Alongside co-operatives, he remained committed throughout his adult life to socialism, secularism, the extension of the vote, and the abolition of slavery. In 1844 he married Betty Smith, with whom he went on to have six children. Following a strike the same year he became a founding member of the Rochdale Society of Equitable Pioneers and by the end of the year he began work as the society's first cashier, and in 1849 was appointed secretary.

Cooper took part in efforts with E.V. Neale to lobby parliament to amend the Industrial and Provident Societies Partnership Act 1852 to enable co-operatives to establish a co-operative wholesale society. Cooper was also secretary to the Co-operative Congress Board.

In 1860 he authored the pamphlet History of the Rochdale District Co-operative Corn Mill Society.

He died on 31 October 1868 from typhus at the age of 46 and was buried in Rochdale Cemetery. Upon his death George Holyoake praised Cooper for his unrelenting commitment to co-operation and the "drudgery" of his work promoting the movement.

== Bibliography ==
- Cooper, William (1861). History of the Rochdale District Co-operative Corn Mill Society. Holyoake & Company.
- Holyoake, George Jacob (1900). The History of the Rochdale Pioneers, 1844-1892. London: Swan Sonnenschein & Co.
