= Boughton, Norfolk =

Village in Norfolk, England

Coordinates: 52.589°N 0.511°E

Boughton
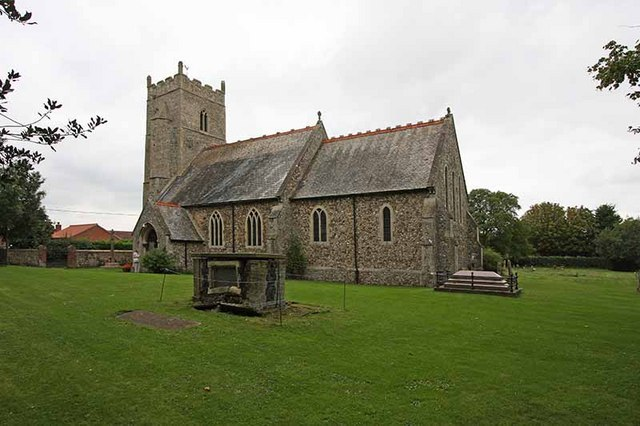
- Parish church of All Saints

- Location within Norfolk
- Area: 5.48 km^{2} (2.12 sq mi)
- Population: 233 (parish, 2021 census)
  - Density: 43/km^{2} (110/sq mi)
- OS grid reference: TF7002
  - London: 97.7 miles (157.2 km)
- Civil parish: Boughton
- District: King's Lynn and West Norfolk
- Shire county: Norfolk
- Region: East
- Country: England
- Sovereign state: United Kingdom
- Post town: KING'S LYNN
- Postcode district: PE33
- Dialling code: 01366
- Police: Norfolk
- Fire: Norfolk
- Ambulance: East of England
- UK Parliament: South West Norfolk

Boughton is a village and civil parish in the English county of Norfolk. It is 5.5 miles (8.9 km) east of Downham Market, 12 miles (19 km) south of King's Lynn and 33 miles (53 km) west of Norwich.

== History ==
Boughton's name is of Anglo-Saxon origin. In the Domesday Book it is listed as a settlement of 24 households in the hundred of Clackclose. In 1086, the village was divided between the estates of Reginald, son of Ivo and Ralph Baynard.

Outside of the village there is an observation post constructed by the Royal Observer Corps during the Second World War, the post was converted into a nuclear warning station during the Cold War.

== Geography ==
According to the 2021 census, the population of Boughton is 233 people which shows a slight increase from the 227 people listed in the 2011 census. The village is north of the route A134 road which links King's Lynn to Colchester. The nearest railway station is at Downham Market for the Fen Line which runs between King's Lynn and Cambridge. The nearest airport is Norwich International Airport, although unusually for a village of this size, it has two separate airstrips, Boughton North and Boughton South.

The village is centred around Boughton Pond and nearby is Boughton Fen, a Site of Special Scientific Interest. Amenities within the village include a doctors surgery.

== Church ==
Boughton's parish church is dedicated to All Saints. The tower dates from the medieval period, although most of the church was restored in the 19th-century. The church is Grade II listed.

== Governance ==
Boughton is part of the electoral ward of Wissey for local elections and is part of the district of King's Lynn and West Norfolk. It is part of the South West Norfolk parliamentary constituency.

== Notable people ==
- John Young Stratton (1829/30 – 1905): author, essayist, social reformer and campaigner against rural poverty.
- John Ashworth, clergyman Dean of Trinidad from 1948 to 1954.
