= William Braund =

Merchant

William Braund (1695–1774) was a merchant in London who engaged in trade with Portugal and was a director of the East India Company.

He built a grand house in Hacton where he lived and developed the surrounding estate.
