= Jimmy Ashworth =

Irish footballer

Personal information
- Full name: James Joseph Ashworth
- Date of birth: 1918
- Place of birth: Ireland
- Date of death: 1990 (aged 71–72)
- Position: Centre-forward

Senior career*
Years	Team	Apps	(Gls)
1938	Blackpool	4	(0)
- * Club domestic league appearances and goals

James Joseph Ashworth (1918–1990) was an Irish footballer. His only known club was Blackpool, for whom he made four Football League appearances in 1938.
