= National Co-operative Archive =

Archive in Manchester, England

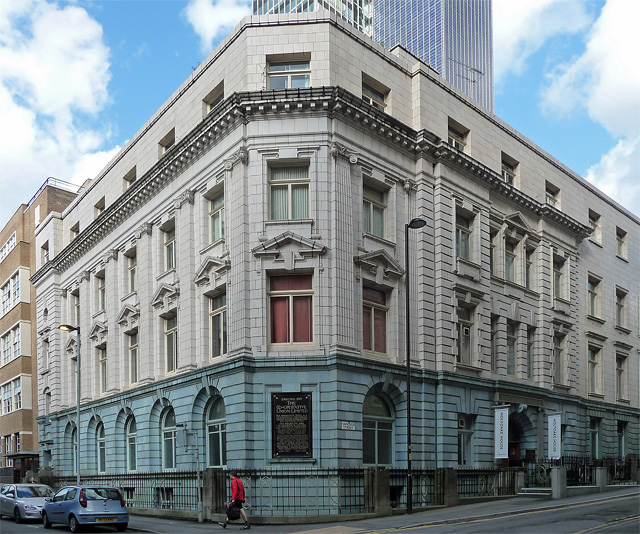
- Holyoake House
- Interactive map of National Co-operative Archive
- 53°29′11″N 2°14′22″W
- Location: Holyoake House, Hanover Street, Manchester, M60 0AS, United Kingdom
- Type: Archive of the British co-operative movement
- Established: 1903
- Affiliation: Co-operative Heritage Trust

Building information
- Building: Holyoake House
- Website: co-operativeheritage.coop

The National Co-operative Archive, located in Holyoake House, Manchester, UK, is home to collections relating to the history of the co-operative movement, that provide an unrivalled resource for the understanding of the co-operative movement from its initial ideas of the nineteenth century to the present day. The archive includes manuscripts, rare books, periodicals, films, photographs and oral histories. The archive is run by the Co-operative Heritage Trust, which also operates the Rochdale Pioneers Museum.

== History ==
The origins of the Archive date from 1903, when the Robert Owen correspondence collection was transferred to the Co-operative Union, and it has been built up gradually over the last century.

The Co-operative College is also located in the building – it was founded in 1919, and in 1946. It moved away from Manchester, because of the damage caused in its headquarters by bombing raids during the Second World War. It was relocated in Stanford Hall, and two Archives started to be developed there. By the late 1990s, it was agreed that the residential model was no longer required for co-operative training and education and the decision was taken to merge the two Archives with material held by the Co-operative Union which owned Holyoake House, and following the steps to create a National Co-operative Archive, major collections were deposited by other co-operative organisations, enhancing the collection.

The relocation of the Co-operative College at its original home in Manchester enabled the development of the Archive and the Rochdale Pioneers Museum.

In 2007, the National Co-operative Archive received Designated Collections Status, reflecting its importance to the heritage of England. The Co-operative Heritage Trust was formed in this year to independently safeguard the collections relating to the movement's heritage at a time of crisis for the Co-operative Group as a supportive entity. The Trust manages both archive and Rochdale Pioneers Museum – seen as the birthplace of the modern global movement. The Trust became an incorporated charity on the 11th of October 2019, with an independent board of Trustees. The Trust holds accredited status for its museum collections (February 2020).

== About the collections ==
The Archive contains information about a wide range of subjects like local and family history, business development, consumerism, leisure, retailing, manufacturing, international co-operation and education.

Co-operatives have always involved a wide range of people and form part of their communities, which is why the National Co-operative Archive embraces many subjects:

=== Prominent co-operators ===
The Archive holds much correspondence of individuals that have played a part in the development and success of co-operative movement.

=== Dividend and tokens ===
The National Co-operative Archive holds books and pamphlets giving details and financial statistics of the history of the co-operative movement and dividend (dividend: the way in which co-operative societies share the benefits with its members).

=== Co-operative societies ===
The Archive holds many records relating to individual co-operative societies. These include national organisations, some local, and other independent societies in the UK.

=== Advertising and packaging ===
These records can be particularly useful for knowing about old products, looking at the history of advertising and for social historians. They give a nostalgic view of the consumer culture and the trends of the past.

=== Film and photographs ===
The co-operative movement was active in making film from the turn of the nineteenth century. The films were aimed at promoting co-operative ideas and values.

=== Fashion ===
The collections can be used to research both changes in fashion and the manufacture of clothing and shoes. The co-operative movement made functional work wear along with more fashionable items.

=== Education ===
Co-operative members have participated in adult education through their societies since the middle of the nineteenth century and some co-operatives societies had their own libraries. The catalogues of these libraries give a picture of the reading habits.

=== Social activities ===
Entertainment, dances, day trips and holidays, in which co-operatives were involved, are in journals and society records at the Archive.

=== Youth ===
Activities and events involving young people are in journals and society records at the Archive.

=== Wartime ===
The co-operative movement took an active role in the war effort, and the Archive holds a great deal of information in a variety of media relating to both World Wars.

=== Architecture ===
The Archive holds journals which provide information on the interior design of buildings and photographs showing the construction and special symbols used in building designs.
