= John Ashworth (priest) =

Dean of Trinidad

John Edward Maurice Ashworth (23 January 1900 – 10 April 1972) was Dean of Trinidad from 1948 to 1954.

Ashworth was educated at the University of London. He was ordained in 1934 and served curacies in Great Grimsby and South Kirkby. He was Rector of Boughton, Norfolk from 1937 to 1948 before his time as Archdeacon and Vicar of Heworth, York afterwards.

Church of England titles
| Preceded by Harold Beardmore | Dean of Trinidad; 1948–1954 | Succeeded by Benjamin Noel Young Vaughan |
