= James Ashworth (footballer) =

English footballer

Personal information
- Full name: James Ernest Ashworth
- Date of birth: 28 January 1902
- Place of birth: Warrington, England
- Date of death: 1977 (aged 74 or 75)
- Place of death: Peterborough, Cambridgeshire
- Position: Outside left

Senior career*
Years	Team	Apps	(Gls)
1924	Everton	0	(0)
1925	Nottingham Forest	3	(0)
1926	Blackpool	0	(0)
Total		3	(0)
- * Club domestic league appearances and goals

James Ernest Ashworth (28 January 1902 – 1977) was an English footballer. He was on the books of three clubs—Everton, Nottingham Forest and Blackpool—but he only made Football League appearances for Forest.

His father, Thomas Richard Ashworth, was killed in 1915 in World War I.
