= John Ashworth (cricketer) =

English cricketer

Personal information
- Full name: John Thomas Ashworth
- Born: 27 February 1850; Haslingden, Lancashire, England
- Died: 20 October 1901 (aged 51); Oldham, Lancashire, England
- Role: Batsman

Domestic team information
- Years: Team
- 1871–1873: Lancashire
- FC debut: 3 August 1871 Lancashire v Kent
- Last FC: 30 June 1873 Lancashire v Yorkshire

Career statistics
Competition	First-class
Matches	2
Runs scored	28
Batting average	9.33
100s/50s	0/0
Top score	19
Catches/stumpings	0/–
- Source: CricketArchive, 28 March 2011

John Thomas Ashworth (27 February 1850 – 20 October 1901) was an English first-class cricketer. He was a middle-order batsman and played two first-class matches for Lancashire. A regular player for both the Rochdale and Castleton clubs, Ashworth made his County debut against Kent on 3 August 1871. He was selected for Lancashire again two years later, playing in the loss to Yorkshire.
