= John Ashworth (preacher) =

British preacher, manufacturer, and author (1813–1875)

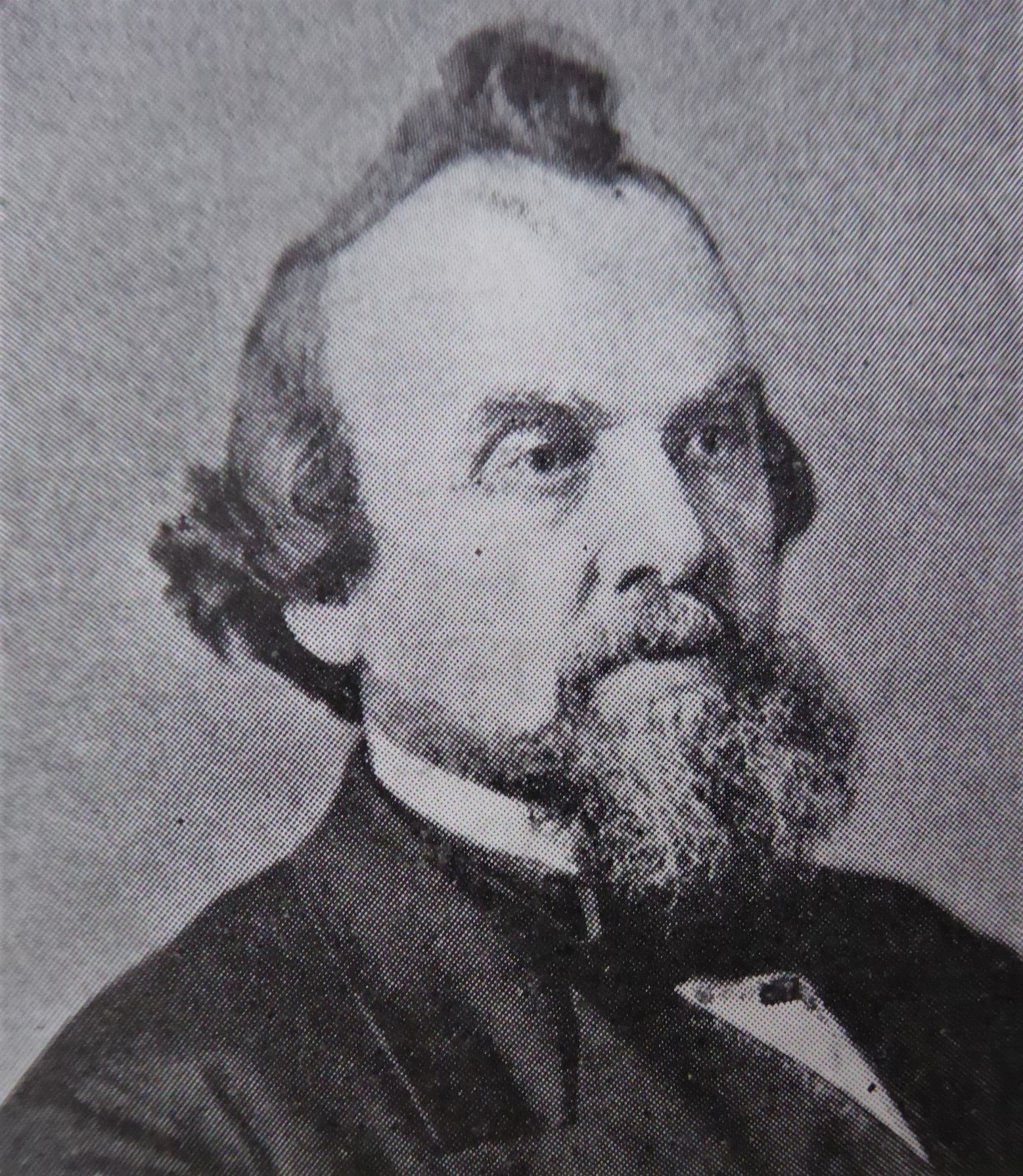

Personal details
- Born: 8 July 1813 Cutgate, Rochdale, England
- Died: 26 January 1875 (aged 61)
- Buried: Rochdale
- Denomination: Christian
- Occupation: Preacher
- Profession: Master painter

John Ashworth (8 July 1813 – 26 January 1875) was an English preacher, manufacturer, and author.

== Early life ==
Ashworth was born on 8 July 1813 at the hamlet of Cutgate near Rochdale, the eighth child of his parents, who were poor woollen weavers. He has himself told the story of his mother manufacturing a 'bishop' (pinafore) for him out of a pack-sheet, from which all her exertions could not wash away the indelible word 'Wool,' which therefore formed his breastplate. The poverty of the family was further embittered by the intemperance of the father, who, however, reformed later in life. The only education which John obtained was at a Sunday school.

== Career ==
He married before he was twenty. The union was a happy one, but Ashworth and his first wife had years of struggle with poverty and care. His position somewhat improved, and in 1851, when visiting the Great Exhibition, he formed the resolution of founding a chapel for the destitute in Rochdale, but the proposal was so much discouraged by his friends that he abandoned it for a time, and did not put it into execution until 1858, at which point he would found the non-conformist Chapel for the Destitute.

As minister of this chapel Ashworth was brought into close contact with the poorest people of a factory town. He was a preacher of the orthodox type and he gathered a great congregation. He was a liberal in politics, a staunch teetotaller, and an advocate for the Maine Law and the observance of the Sunday after a puritanical fashion. He visited the United States and the Holy Land, and for many years had a busy life as preacher, manufacturer, lecturer, and author.

Ashworth wrote Walks in Canaan and Back from Canaan, and had begun an account of his Rambles in the New World he died; his chief work was Strange Tales, followed after a time by another anthology, Simple Records. These were printed as separate tracts, and have had a circulation in the millions. Some have been translated into Welsh, French, Dutch, Russian, and Spanish. Yet the publisher to whom the first one was offered only undertook to print it on being guaranteed from any risk. These narratives are interesting for the glimpses they give of the life of the poor of the manufacturing districts. They mostly relate incidents that had come to his knowledge during his work amongst the poor. The accuracy of one was challenged, but for most of them sufficient vouchers could be adduced. Ashworth's intimate knowledge of the class he describes makes his Strange Tales particularly valuable.

== Death ==
Ashworth died on 26 January 1875, and was followed to his grave in the Rochdale cemetery by a procession of those amongst whom he had laboured.
