= Rochdale Principles =

Organizing guidelines for a co-op

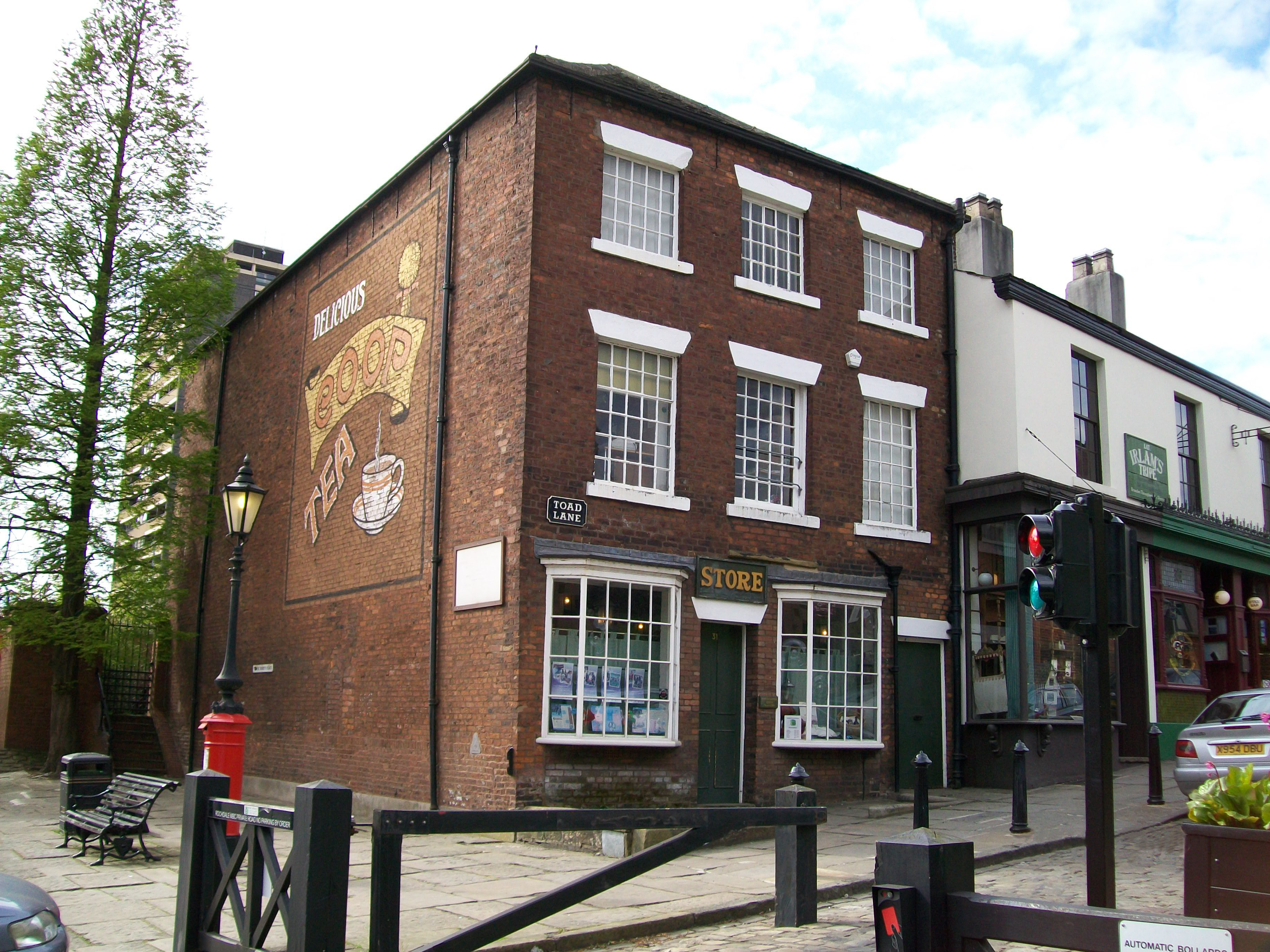
The original Toad Lane Store in Rochdale, United Kingdom

The Rochdale Principles are a set of ideals for the operation of cooperatives. They were first set out in 1844 by the Rochdale Society of Equitable Pioneers in Rochdale, England, and have formed the basis for the principles on which co-operatives around the world continue to operate. The implications of the Rochdale Principles are a focus of study in co-operative economics. The original Rochdale Principles were officially adopted by the International Cooperative Alliance (ICA) in 1937 as the Rochdale Principles of Co-operation. Updated versions of the principles were adopted by the ICA in 1966 as the Co-operative Principles and in 1995 as part of the Statement on the Co-operative Identity.

== Current ICA version of co-operative principles ==
The Rochdale Principles, according to the 1995 ICA revision, can be summarised as follows.

=== Voluntary and open membership ===
The first of the Rochdale Principles states that co-operative societies must have an open and voluntary membership. According to the ICA's Statement on the Co-operative Identity, "Co-operatives are voluntary organisations, open to all persons able to use their services and willing to accept the responsibilities of membership, without gender, social, racial, political or religious discrimination."

==== Anti-discrimination ====
To discriminate socially is to make a distinction between people on the basis of class or category. Examples of social discrimination include racial, casteist, religious, sexual, sexual orientation, disability, and ethnic discrimination. To fulfill the first Rochdale Principle, a co-operative society should not prevent anyone willing to participate from doing so on any of these grounds. However, this does not prohibit the co-operative from setting reasonable and relevant ground rules for membership, such as residing in a specific geographic area or paying a membership fee to join, so long as all persons meeting such criteria are able to participate if they so choose.

==== Motivations and rewards ====
Given the voluntary nature of co-operatives, members need reasons to participate. Each person's motivations will be unique and will vary from one co-operative to another, but they will often be a combination of the following:

- Financial – Some co-operatives are able to provide members with financial benefits.
- Quality of life – Serving the community through a co-operative because doing service makes one's own life better is perhaps the most significant motivation for volunteering. Included here would be the benefits people get from being with other people, staying active, and above all having a sense of the value of ourselves in society that may not be as clear in other areas of life.
- Giving back – Many people have in some way benefited from the work of a co-operative and volunteer to give back.
- Altruism – Some volunteer for the benefit of others.
- A sense of duty – Some see participation in community as a responsibility that comes with citizenship. In this case, they may not describe themselves as volunteers.
- Career experience – Volunteering offers experiences that can add to career prospects.

=== Democratic member control ===
The second of the Rochdale Principles states that co-operative societies must have democratic member control. According to the ICA's Statement on the Co-operative Identity, "Co-operatives are democratic organizations controlled by their members, who actively participate in setting their policies and making decisions. Men and women serving as elected representatives are accountable to the membership. In primary co-operatives members have equal voting rights (one member, one vote) and co-operatives at other levels are also organised in a democratic manner."

=== Member economic participation ===
Member economic participation is one of the defining features of co-operative societies, and constitutes the third Rochdale Principle in the ICA's Statement on the Co-operative Identity. According to the ICA, co-operatives are enterprises in which "Members contribute equitably to, and democratically control, the capital of their co-operative. At least part of that capital is usually the common property of the co-operative. Members usually receive limited compensation, if any, on capital subscribed as a condition of membership. Members allocate surpluses for any or all of the following purposes: developing their co-operative, possibly by setting up reserves, part of which at least would be indivisible; benefiting members in proportion to their transactions with the co-operative; and supporting other activities approved by the membership." This principle, in turn, can be broken down into a number of constituent parts.

==== Democratic control ====
The first part of this principle states that "Members contribute equitably to, and democratically control, the capital of their co-operative. At least part of that capital is usually the common property of the co-operative." This enshrines democratic control over the co-operative, and how its capital is used.

==== Limitations on member compensation and appropriate use of surpluses ====
The second part of the principle deals with how members are compensated for funds invested in a co-operative, and how surpluses should be used. Unlike for-profit corporations, co-operatives are a form of social enterprise. Given this, there are at least three purposes for which surplus funds can be used, or distributed, by a co-operative.

- "Members usually receive limited compensation, if any, on capital subscribed as a condition of membership."
- "Developing their co-operative, possibly by setting up reserves, part of which at least would be indivisible;" in other words, the surplus can be reinvested in the co-operative.
- "Benefiting members in proportion to their transactions with the co-operative;" for example, a consumers' co-operative may decide to pay dividends based on purchases (or a 'divvi').
- "Supporting other activities approved by the membership."

=== Autonomy and independence ===
The fourth of the Rochdale Principles states that co-operative societies must be autonomous and independent. According to the ICA's Statement on the Co-operative Identity, "Co-operatives are autonomous, self-help organizations controlled by their members. If they enter into agreements with other organizations, including governments, or raise capital from external sources, they do so on terms that ensure democratic control by their members and maintain their co-operative autonomy."

=== Education, training, and information ===
The fifth of the Rochdale Principles states that co-operative societies must provide education and training to their members and the public. According to the ICA's Statement on the Co-operative Identity, "Co-operatives provide education and training for their members, elected representatives, managers and employees so they can contribute effectively to the development of their co-operatives. They inform the general public – particularly young people and opinion leaders – about the nature and benefits of co-operation."

=== Cooperation among cooperatives ===
The sixth of the Rochdale Principles states that co-operatives cooperate with each other. According to the ICA's Statement on the Co-operative Identity, "Co-operatives serve their members most effectively and strengthen the co-operative movement by working together through local, national, regional and international structures."

=== Concern for community ===
The seventh of the Rochdale Principles states that co-operative societies must have concern for their communities. According to the ICA's Statement on the Co-operative Identity, "Co-operatives work for the sustainable development of their communities through policies approved by their members."

== Previous versions ==
=== 1878 version ===
1. Allow but one vote to a shareholder, without regard to the number of shares held.
2. Shares to draw a minimum rate of interest.
3. Dividends to be made only on purchases, and that quarterly.
4. Every member of the order entitled to full dividends on purchases, provided the directors may retain such dividends in their discretion, until the same shall amount to at least one share of stock.
5. Shares not to exceed $5 each, unless required otherwise by statute.
6. Dividends to non-members one-half the profits on their purchases.
7. Sell at current prices-the same price to members of the order and the general public-thus disarming opposition.
8. Look after the interests of the store as strictly as if the store were an individual property.
9. Choose persons worthy of your confidence for managers- then give them your hearty support.

=== 1937 version ===
1. Open membership.
2. Democratic control (one person, one vote).
3. Distribution of surplus in proportion to trade.
4. Payment of limited interest on capital.
5. Political and religious neutrality.
6. Cash trading (no credit extended).
7. Promotion of education.

=== ICA revision (1966) ===
At the 1963 Bournemouth Congress of the ICA, attendees appointed a second commission on the Rochdale principles, composed of one representative each from Great Britain, Western Europe, Eastern Europe, United States, and India. D.G. Karve, the representative from India, chaired the commission.

1. Open, voluntary membership.
2. Democratic governance.
3. Limited return on equity.
4. Surplus belongs to members.
5. Education of members and public in cooperative principles.
6. Cooperation between cooperatives.

== See also ==
- Rochdale College (a Canadian experiment in Rochdale principles)
- Rochdale Village, Queens, a cooperative housing project in New York.
- York Center, Illinois, a cooperative community in Illinois.
