= Mark Braund =

English chief executive

- Born: England
- Occupation: CEO of RedstoneConnect

Mark Braund is the current chief executive RedstoneConnect.

Braund was appointed CEO of InterQuest in 2011 during which time he oversaw a major rebranding of the Group's businesses. Prior to Mark's appointment as CEO of InterQuest he gained over 30 years of experience in the recruitment sector with Manpower and IBM; and as founder of recruitment organisation Barker Personnel Services before overseeing their sale to the Carlisle Group in 2000.

Braund is a regular contributor for the Huffington Post, Staffing Industry Analysts and the Information Daily, writing articles covering a broad range of topics including technology, analytics, recruitment and HR. Mark has a keen interest in the subject of analytics, one of the key areas of his company's focus and has had articles on the subject published on several occasions.
