= Charles Howarth =

English co-operator (1814–1868)

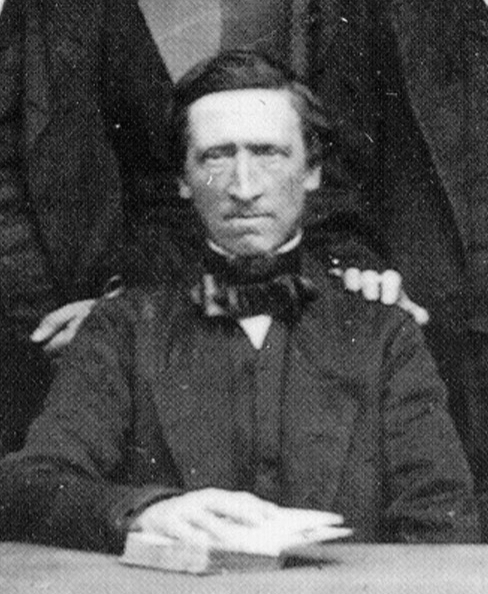
- Howarth in 1865
- Born: 9 February 1814; Rochdale, Lancashire, England
- Died: 25 June 1868 (aged 54); Heywood, Lancashire, England
- Occupations: Warper; Co-operator
- Movement: Co-operative; Owenism
- Board member of: Rochdale Society of Equitable Pioneers; North of England Co-operative Wholesale Society
- Spouse: Ann Chadwick (m. 1835)
- Children: 9

Charles Howarth (9 February 1814 – 25 June 1868) was a British cotton-worker, co-operator, Owenite, and co-founder of the Rochdale Society of Equitable Pioneers. Howarth also played a key role in the establishment of the North of England Co-operative Wholesale Society.

== Early life ==
Howarth was born on the 9 February 1814 in Rochdale, Lancashire to George Howarth and his wife, Susan (née Bamford). Not much is known of Howarth's childhood or education but he became politicised as an Owenite socialist in his teens at a time when there were experimental Owenite projects in Rochdale, and he became active in the local Owenite branch.

He began working in cotton mills, later becoming a warper. On 5 April 1835 he married Ann Chadwick with whom he later had five daughters and four sons.

== Rochdale Pioneers ==
Howarth was part of the Rochdale Friendly Co-operative Society who from 1833 ran a co-op shop at 15 Toad Lane in Rochdale. The business failed after two years of trading due to a high level of debt.

On 11 August 1844 Howarth was appointed as one of the three trustees of a new co-op, the Rochdale Society of Equitable Pioneers, who opened a shop at 31 Toad Lane. Howarth was also primarily responsible for drafting the society's rules. He drew on the model rules presented at the 1832 Co-operative Congress and the rules of the Rational Association Sick and Burial Society of Manchester. He also included provision for members to receive an end-of-year dividend proportionate to purchases. The shop was successful and the society began to grow rapidly, while the business model and rules adopted by the pioneers were then replicated by others.

== Other ventures ==
Following the success of the Rochdale Pioneers, Howarth was a leading advocate for the establishment of a wholesaler for co-operative societies and subsequently served on the management committee of the North of England Co-operative Wholesale Society (later shortened to the Co-operative Wholesale Society). He also played a role in founding the Rochdale District Cooperative Corn Mill and served as a director of the Co-operative Insurance Society until his death.

== Death ==
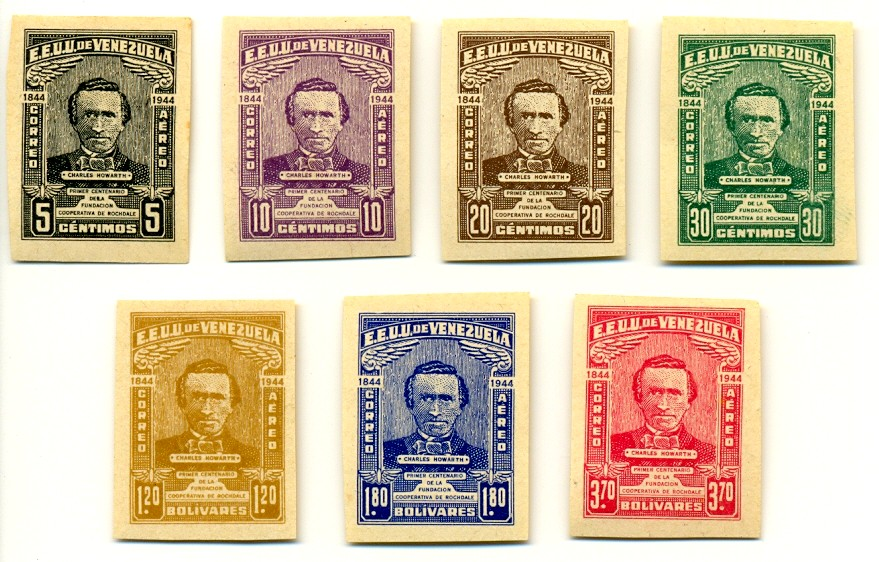
Set of postage stamps of Howarth issued by Venezuela in 1944.

Howarth ceased working as a warper in the mid-1860s before dying on 25 June 1868, aged 54, at home in Heywood and was buried in Heywood Cemetery. His death was attributed to asthma. He was survived by his wife and five of his nine children.

In 1944 Venezuela issued a set of postage stamps of Howarth to commemorate the centenary of the establishment of the Rochdale Society of Equitable Pioneers.
