= Rochdale Society of Equitable Pioneers =

British consumer co-operative

Coordinates: 53.6187°N 2.1594°W

The Rochdale Society of Equitable Pioneers, founded in 1844, was an early consumers' co-operative, and one of the first to pay a patronage dividend, forming the basis for the modern co-operative movement. Although other co-operatives preceded it, the Rochdale Pioneers co-operative became the prototype for societies in Great Britain. The Rochdale Pioneers are most famous for designing the Rochdale Principles, a set of principles of co-operation, which provide the foundation for the principles on which co-ops around the world operate to this day. The model the Rochdale Pioneers used is a focus of study within co-operative economics.

== History ==
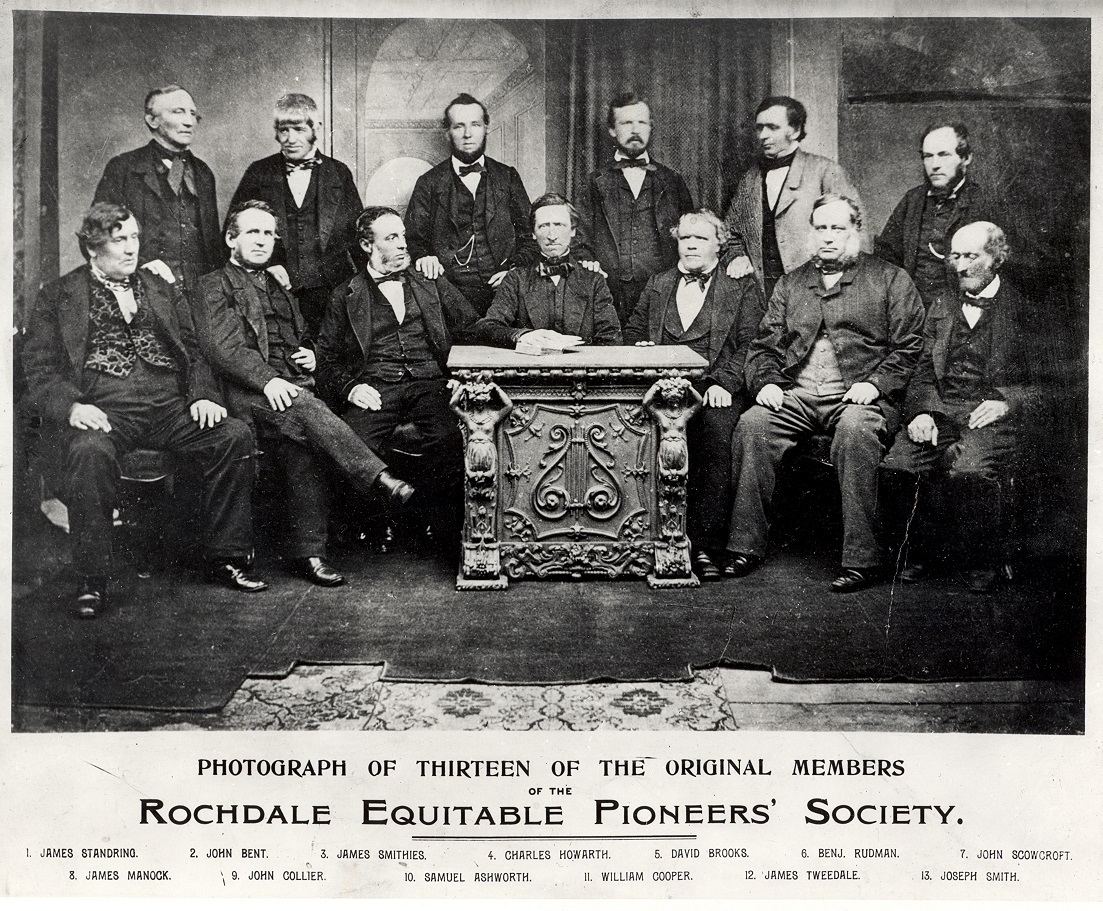
Thirteen of the surviving Rochdale Pioneers, photographed in 1865.

As the mechanisation of the Industrial Revolution was forcing more and more skilled workers into poverty, a group of tradesmen decided to band together to open their own store selling food items they could not otherwise afford. With lessons from prior failed attempts at co-operation in mind, they designed the now famous Rochdale Principles, and over a period of four months raised £10 to rent premises in Toad Lane, Rochdale, having collected £28 of starting capital. On 21 December 1844, they opened their store with a very meagre selection of butter, sugar, flour, oatmeal for sale. Within three months, they expanded their selection to include tea and tobacco, and they were soon known for providing high-quality, unadulterated goods. By the end of their first year trading, the Pioneers had 80 members and £182 of capital.

It is widely believed that the co-operative's members were a group of 28 men. This figure is cited because it was believed that the £28 of capital was raised in equal shares of £1, often paid in instalments. However the co-operative's minutes never mention 28 men or the figure of £28 - as researchers showed in 2016, after careful and full consideration of the society's records. It is believed that this was propaganda invented by George Holyoake.

By 1900, the British co-operative movement had grown to 1,439 co-operatives covering virtually every area of the UK.

The later minute books for the REPS (Rochdale Equitable Pioneers Society) are held by Rochdale Boroughwide Cultural Trust but the wider records of the movement are held by the National Co-operative Archive at Holyoake House in Manchester. The society traded independently until 1991, changing its name as it merged with neighbouring co-operatives, to Pioneers in 1976 and to Norwest Pioneers in 1982. In 1991, the Norwest Co-operative Society, based in Wythenshawe, Manchester, transferred its engagements to United Co-operatives, which was run from Rochdale. It in turn transferred its engagements to the Manchester-based national hybrid society, The Co-operative Group, in 2007.

== Objectives ==
At the outset, the Pioneers had a clear set of objects, as set out in "Law the First" of its rules:

- The objects and plans of the Society are to form arrangements for the pecuniary benefit, and improvement of the social and domestic condition of its members, by raising a sufficient amount of capital in shares of £1 each, to bring into operation the following plans and arrangements:
- The establishment of a store for the sale of provisions, clothing, etc.
- The building, purchasing or erecting of a number of houses, in which those members desiring to assist each other in improving their domestic and social condition may reside.
- To commence the manufacture of such articles as the Society may determine upon, for the employment of such members as may be without employment or who may be suffering in consequence of repeated reductions in their wages.
- As a further benefit and security to the members of this Society, the Society shall purchase or rent an estate or estates of land, which shall be cultivated by the members who may be out of employment or whose labour may be badly remunerated.
- That as soon as practicable the Society shall proceed to arrange the powers of production, distribution, education and government, or in other words, to establish a self-supporting home colony of united interests, or assist other societies in establishing such colonies.
- That for the promotion of sobriety, a temperance hotel be opened in one of the Society’s houses as soon as convenient.

Many aspects of these objects can be seen directly in the modern-day co-operative movement.

== Museum ==
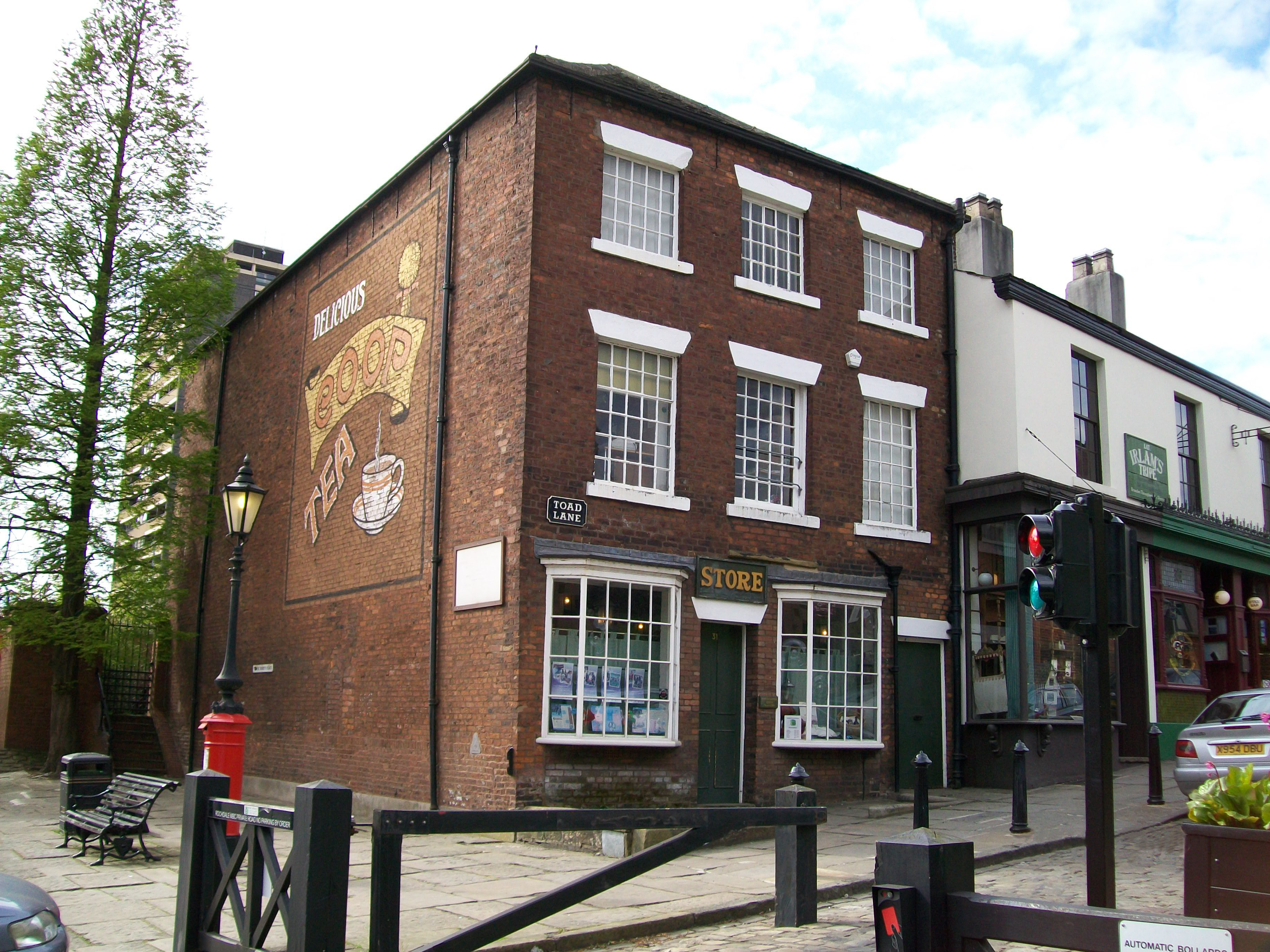
The original Toad Lane Store

The Pioneers rented their first store at 31 Toad Lane and moved out in 1867 but the co-operative movement later purchased it, and opened it as a museum in 1931.

The museum is known as The Rochdale Pioneers Museum. It is now a separate legal entity, as the museum and archive are operated by a charity, the Co-operative Heritage Trust CIO, which was incorporated in 2019. The society's name is no longer used, but remains in the registry of Co-operatives UK (formerly known as the Co-operative Union, to whom the building of 31 Toad Lane belonged until legal transfer to the Co-operative Heritage Trust in 2007).

== See also ==
- The Rochdale Pioneers (2012 film)
- History of the cooperative movement
